= Kristian Løken =

Norwegian military officer (1884–1961)

Kristian Rikardsen Løken
- Born: 31 July 1884; Elverum, Sweden-Norway
- Died: March 1961 (aged 76)
- Spouse: Guldborg Noer (m. 1931)
- Relatives: Halvor Løken (brother)
- Military career
- Allegiance: Norway; Congo Free State (1907–8); Belgium: Belgian Congo
- Branch: Norwegian Army; Force Publique
- Service years: Norwegian Army: 1906–1954; Force Publique: 1907–1917
- Rank: Colonel (Norwegian Army); Commandant (Force Publique)
- Nickname: Kongo-Løken
- Unit: 6th Division
- Commands: 6th Division (acting commander); 6th District Command; 6th Brigade; 14th Infantry Regiment; Battalion of the Force Publique
- Conflicts: First World War; East African campaign; Battle of Ruakadigi; Second World War; Norwegian campaign; Battles of Narvik; Battle of Gratangen
- Awards: St. Olav's Medal With Oak Branch; Defence Medal 1940–1945; Haakon VII Jubilee Medal 1905–1955; Chevalier of the Légion d'honneur Croix de guerre Knight of the Royal Order of the Lion; Officer of the Order of Leopold II; Knight of the Order of Leopold; Knight of the Order of the Crown with palm Croix de guerre with palm Order of the African Star, Silver Medal; 1914-1917 African Campaigns Commemorative Medal; Commemorative Medal of the 1914–1918 War; Inter-Allied Victory Medal 1914–1918; Commemorative Medal of Congo

Kristian Rikardsen Løken (31 July 1884 – March 1961) was a highly decorated Norwegian military officer who served in the Belgian Force Publique from 1907 to 1917, fighting German colonial forces in East Africa from 1914 to 1917, and went on to command a Norwegian Army infantry brigade during the 1940 Norwegian campaign of the Second World War.

In 1943, Løken was one of 1,100 Norwegian officers arrested and sent as prisoners-of-war to Germany, only being released after the German capitulation in 1945.

== Early life and education ==
Kristian Løken was born in the town of Elverum in Hedmark county, Norway. He was the son of smallholder Rikard Løken (1845–1909) and Gurine Syversen (1852–1902). Kristian had an older brother, Halvor (born 8 March 1876), who also sought a military career. He attended the upper section of the Norwegian Military Academy from 1903, graduating as an infantry officer in 1906. That same year he took his examen artium.

After graduating, Løken was posted as a first lieutenant to the 1st Akershus Brigade. In 1910 he achieved a permanent position in the Norwegian infantry. He was transferred to the 5th Brigade in 1911 and to the 2nd Brigade on 1 October 1912.

== Belgian service and the First World War ==
Løken was declared supernumerary soon after graduation, and granted leave from the Norwegian Army in 1907. He then entered the service of the Force Publique in the Congo Free State. He would have three periods of service in the Congo in the coming ten years.

Løken was among a sizeable number of Norwegian junior officers who sought foreign service after being unable to gain paid officers positions in Norway. The Norwegian Armed Forces had trained a large number of officers in the lead-up to the 1905 dissolution of the union between Norway and Sweden, officers that were no longer required once the crisis between the two countries had settled. (Note: In total, 200-300 Norwegian citizens took service in the Congo.)

Along with other Norwegian officers, Løken was shipped out of Kristiania in March 1907. His brother, then army captain Halvor Løken, bid him farewell at the docks with the words "It's a comfort to know that ill weeds never wither" (Norwegian: "Det er jo en trøst å vite at ukrutt ikke forgår så lett"), in reference to the unhealthy and dangerous conditions then to be found in the Congo Free State. (Note: Some 20 Norwegian officers lost their lives as a result of their service in the Congo.)

Løken's group of officers first underwent a three-month colonial training course in Brussels, Belgium, before being shipped to the Congo. (Note: Among the other officers in the group was the later Nazi collaborator Finn Kjelstrup.) During his service in the Congo, Løken would periodically receive renewed permission from the Norwegian authorities to remain in Force Publique service. Initially given command of a Force Publique company, Løken eventually became a battalion commander in the Belgian Congo. Løken was one 21 Norwegians to attain the rank of Commandant in the Force Publique.

He remained in Force Publique service after Leopold II of Belgium gave up his personal control of the territory in 1908 and transferred it to the Belgian state. Løken's first tour in the Congo lasted until 1910, when he returned to Norway. He went back to the Congo in 1911, staying until 1913, and had a final tour from 1914 to 1917. During his final years in the Belgian Congo, Løken saw action as first a company commander and later a battalion commander in the First World War East African Campaign, fighting the German colonial forces commanded by General Paul von Lettow-Vorbeck. Amongst the battles in German East Africa where Løken fought was that at Ruakadigi in present-day Rwanda in January 1916. (Note: Several of the other Norwegian officers fighting on the Belgian side were killed during the East African Campaign. One of the Norwegian fatalities in the campaign occurred in the battle of Ruakadigi, where Commandant Carl Gustav Flood was amongst those killed.)

Kristian Løken left the Force Publique and the Congo in 1917 and returned to Norway on 12 November 1917. Due to his years spent in the Congo he was affectionately nicknamed "Kongo-Løken" by his Norwegian friends and colleagues. During his final years of life, Løken received a pension from the Belgian state for his Force Publique service.

== Inter-war years ==
Returning to regular Norwegian Army service, Løken was promoted to the rank of captain in May 1918. Following his promotion, he assumed command of the 4th Company of the 4th Infantry Regiment, a command he continued to hold until 1930. In 1918 he attended a hand grenade course, in 1919 the Norwegian infantry shooting school, in 1921 a machine gun course and in 1928 a tactical command course. From 1926 onwards he served on occasion as an instructor at the shooting school. From 1929 to 1931 he commanded the First Company of the Norwegian Royal Guards. In the period 1932–1933 he led the Norwegian Military Academy. He attained the rank of major in 1933, and colonel in 1939. From 1933 to 1939 he served with the 6th Infantry Regiment in Hønefoss. In the inter-war years Løken wrote three articles for the military journal Norsk Militært Tidsskrift, one in 1927 on the subject of basic military training and two in 1936 on Norwegians serving with the Force Publique in the First World War East African Campaign.

In addition to his military career, Løken worked for the Office of the Auditor General of Norway from 1920 to 1923. After his years at the Auditor General, Løken spent a year in France in 1923–1924, teaching Norwegian students at the Lycée Pierre-Corneille in Rouen, Normandy. He had been a state authorised French language translator in Norway since 1920.

On 17 January 1931, Kristian Løken married Guldborg Noer (born in Brandval Municipality on 3 July 1886), the daughter of forest owner Arne Noer and Thea Hokaasen. The couple had no children.

== Second World War ==
By the outbreak of the Second World War in 1939, Løken was in command of the 14th Infantry Regiment in Nordland county, a position he had held since 17 January 1939, when he replaced Colonel Carl Gustav Fleischer, who went on to command the 6th Division with the rank of major general.

On 16 December 1939, Løken assumed command of Norwegian 6th Brigade, after the brigade's previous commander Colonel Wilhelm Faye had been appointed chief of defence for Finnmark county following the outbreak of the Winter War between Finland and the Soviet Union. Colonel Løken was also appointed chief of defence for the mainland of Troms county in Northern Norway. In this command Løken carried out brigade-sized field exercises to prepare his troops for potential combat operations. Løken was replaced as commander of the 14th Infantry Regiment by Lieutenant Colonel Thoralf Nummedal. By April 1940, Løken was temporarily in command of the 6th Division's officer cadets, while these were deployed on winter exercises. Løken's headquarters were located in Bardu Municipality in Troms.

=== Norwegian Campaign ===
Following the invasion of Norway and the German attack on Narvik on 9 April 1940, by 3rd Mountain Division troops led by Generaloberst Eduard Dietl, Løken was responsible for carrying out the Norwegian mobilization in Troms. The first task Løken carried out, in addition to the mobilization, was using the forces initially available to him to block the German forces at Narvik from advancing into Troms. Maintaining control of the central army base at Setermoen was vital for the Norwegian mobilization. The forces under Løken's direct command when the Germans invaded were an infantry battalion, a mountain artillery battalion and assorted support troops. In the evening of 8 April, Colonel Løken had been ordered to send his infantry battalion and a motorized artillery battery to Narvik to defend the town, but the transfer of forces was pre-empted by the German landing. In maintaining a defensive posture with almost his entire force during the mobilization stage, Løken came into disagreement with the top leadership of the 6th Division, which wanted a swift counter-attack against the Germans as soon as possible. Despite not mounting an immediate counter-attack, Løken did move troops forward to blocking positions further south than planned, as he saw it as important to stop the German advance in Gratangen Municipality. Colonel Løken's more cautious approach to warfare lead to a deterioration of his relationship with the more offensive division commander, Carl Gustav Fleischer. On 19 April, Løken reported that the morale of the opposing German forces seemed to be faltering, and that most of the Germans appeared to be "below average" at skiing.

After completing the mobilization in his area of responsibility and stopping the German advances into Troms, Colonel Løken was in overall command of the early counter-attacks carried out in late April 1940 by the 6th Brigade against the German forces in the Gratangen area. During this time, Løken first had his headquarters at Kroken in the Salangsdalen valley in Troms county, before it moved forward to Fossbakken in Lavangen Municipality. Løken personally commanded the central axis of the failed first Norwegian advance at Gratangen. During the attack the 6th Brigade greatly outnumbered the German defenders, with two infantry battalions with artillery support mounting a direct attack against the German positions on Lapphaugen, while another two battalions made a flank march to cut off the defenders. The frontal attack failed after Løken had hesitated in attacking and sent his units against strong German positions in a disorganized and uncoordinated manner. While the main attack failed, the flank march of the 1st Battalion, 12th Infantry Regiment was counter-attacked by the Germans, the Norwegians suffering heavy losses and being routed. After the failed initial offensive, Løken severely criticized the commander of the 1st Battalion, 12th Infantry Regiment, Major Nils Christoffer Bøckman, for having bypassed Løken's brigade command in order to receive permission to advance directly from the 6th Division, exposing his unit to counter-attack. Løken's orders to the battalion had been to under no circumstance move down into the Gratangen valley, but stay on defensible ground.

On 29 April 1940, the 6th Division was reorganized into two weak brigades, the three-battalion strong 6th Brigade under Colonel Løken and the slightly smaller 7th Brigade under Colonel Wilhelm Faye. While the 6th Brigade was to follow a generally mountainous advance route against the Germans, the 7th was to attack along the coast in cooperation with French expeditionary forces. The 6th Brigade carried out a hard-fought mountain campaign over the coming weeks, pushing the Germans southwards along the Swedish border.

During the advance ski patrols reported in late April to Colonel Løken that the mountainous Kuberg Plateau, in the advance route of the brigade, was unoccupied by the Germans. Failure on the part of Løken to act on this information and seize the plateau allowed the Germans to occupy and fortify the feature on 7 May 1940, requiring heavy fighting a week later before they were dislodged.

In May 1940, Løken was relieved of command of the 6th Brigade, being replaced by the Lieutenant Colonel Ole Berg. Colonel Løken was instead appointed temporary chief of the 6th District Command (covering Northern Norway) on 7 May 1940, replacing Colonel Lars Mjelde, who had taken sick. The appointment was formally confirmed by royal resolution on 31 May 1940, at a meeting of the King and Cabinet at Storsteinnes in Balsfjord Municipality, Troms county. According to General Otto Ruge's memoirs, the replacement of Løken as a field commander was motivated by a wish on the side of the commander of the 6th Division, General Carl Gustav Fleischer, to have a "young and aggressive" brigade commander. Following his appointment, Lieutenant Colonel Berg led the 6th Brigade in successful offensive actions against the Germans.

The main task of the 6th District Command, which Løken led for the remaining month of the Norwegian Campaign, was to coordinate the efforts of the civilian authorities in Northern Norway in support of the needs of the Norwegian front line forces. During Løken's time in command, the 6th District Command was initially based in Harstad, then later at Moen in Målselv Municipality, Troms.

On 10 June 1940, the forces in Northern Norway capitulated, a ceasefire having been in place since 24:00 on 9 June. Despite having been on the offensive until 8 June, the Norwegian troops were ordered to capitulate after the Allies had pulled out of Norway. Before releasing the Norwegian officers from captivity, the Germans demanded that each gave their word of honour not to participate in further resistance. Following the Norwegian capitulation, Colonel Løken worked on maintaining order and calm in Northern Norway in the transition phase to German occupation. Løken had been made the acting commander of the 6th Division in the demobilization phase, retaining a 10-man force of armed military police under his command until 27 July 1940. The military police officers worked on returning requisitioned civilian vehicles and organizing military depots. Once the tasks in connection with the demobilization of the Norwegian forces in the north were completed, Løken returned to his home in Mosjøen.

In mid-1941 Løken moved to Oslo. In the period March 1942 to July 1943 he worked in Oslo's civil air defence.

=== Imprisonment ===
In August 1943, the German occupying authorities carried out mass arrests of 1,100 Norwegian officers, suspecting the officer class of supporting the Norwegian resistance movement. Colonel Kristian Løken was arrested on 16 August 1943 and given prisoner number 913.

He was first imprisoned at Oflag XXI-C in Schildberg in the German-annexed Reichsgau Wartheland. While interned at Oflag XXI-C, Løken shared a room with Colonel Johannes Schiøtz, with whom he had attended the Norwegian Military Academy close to four decades earlier. (Note: Several other members of the Norwegian Military Academy class of 1906 were also interned with Løken in Germany, amongst whom were Colonel Gulbrand Østbye (who like Løken had led an infantry brigade during the 1940 Norwegian Campaign), Colonel August Emil Dessen Tobiesen, Major Kolbjørn Knudsen and Major Georg Otto Lorange.) Løken and Schiøtz were roommates at Oflag XXI-C from 6 January 1944 to 19 January 1945, when the Norwegian prisoners were sent on a one-week forced-march on foot and by train to Oflag III-A in Luckenwalde, Germany. On 24 January, five days into the journey, Løken was transferred to a hospital train carriage, suffering from ill health. The Norwegian prisoners of war remained interned at Oflag III-A until their German guards abandoned the camp on 21 April 1945, with Soviet forces arriving the next day. On 10 May 1945, two days after the end of the war in Europe, the Norwegian prisoners left Luckenwalde, reaching Norway in several groups in late May/early June 1945. Løken arrived in Oslo on 28 May 1945.

== Post-war life ==
From 1946 to 1954, Løken worked with the General Inspector of the Infantry, and until 1952 as a French language teacher at the Norwegian Military Academy.

In 1947, Løken also held the position as second in command of District Command North in Northern Norway. According to the Norwegian military intelligence officer Christian Christensen, Løken's relationship with the commander of District Command North, General Arne Dagfin Dahl, was poor. Løken was, according to Christensen, completely relegated from any meaningful tasks by General Dahl. Several years previously, during the 1940 Norwegian Campaign, Løken had been Dahl's commanding officer. On 1 August 1949 he formally retired from the Norwegian Armed Forces, yet continued working for several years under temporary contracts.

Colonel Kristian Løken was the vice chairman of the reconstituted Norwegian Congo Veterans' Association (Norwegian: Norske kongoveteraners forening, French: Section de Norvège des Vétérans Coloniaux). He remained a member until the association was finally disestablished in 1960, being awarded the society's 50-year medal (commemorating the disestablishment of the Congo Free State in 1908) in 1958. (Note: The original association, founded in 1939, had been disestablished in 1946. After exclusions of members who had committed treason during the Second World War, the association was reconstituted in 1947.)

By 1948, he lived in Oslo, Norway. Kristian Rikardsen Løken died in March 1961, aged 76.

== Honours and awards ==
For his services in the Congo, the Belgian authorities awarded Løken a total of 14 decorations. Among his Belgian honours, Løken was made an Officer of the Order of Leopold II, a Knight of Order of Leopold, a Knight of the Royal Order of the Lion and a Knight of the Order of the Crown with palm, as well as being awarded the Croix de guerre with palm, the Order of the African Star, Silver Medal, the 1914–1917 African Campaigns Commemorative Medal, the Commemorative Medal of the 1914–1918 War, the Inter-Allied Victory Medal 1914–1918, and the Commemorative Medal of Congo.

After the end of the Second World War, Colonel Løken was decorated by the Norwegian government with the St. Olav's Medal With Oak Branch, the second highest Norwegian war decoration. He also received the Defence Medal 1940–1945 and the King Haakon VII 1905–1930 Jubilee Medal. The French government made him an Officier of the Légion d'honneur and awarded him the Croix de guerre.
