= Gratangen =

Gratangen may refer to:

== Places ==
- Gratangen Municipality, a municipality in Troms county, Norway
- Gratangen (fjord), a fjord in Gratangen Municipality in Troms county, Norway
- Gratangen Church, a church in Gratangen Municipality in Troms county, Norway

== Other ==
- Battle of Gratangen, a battle during World War II in Gratangen Municipality in Troms county, Norway
- Gratangen IL, a sports club based in Gratangen Municipality in Troms county, Norway
