= Alta Battalion =

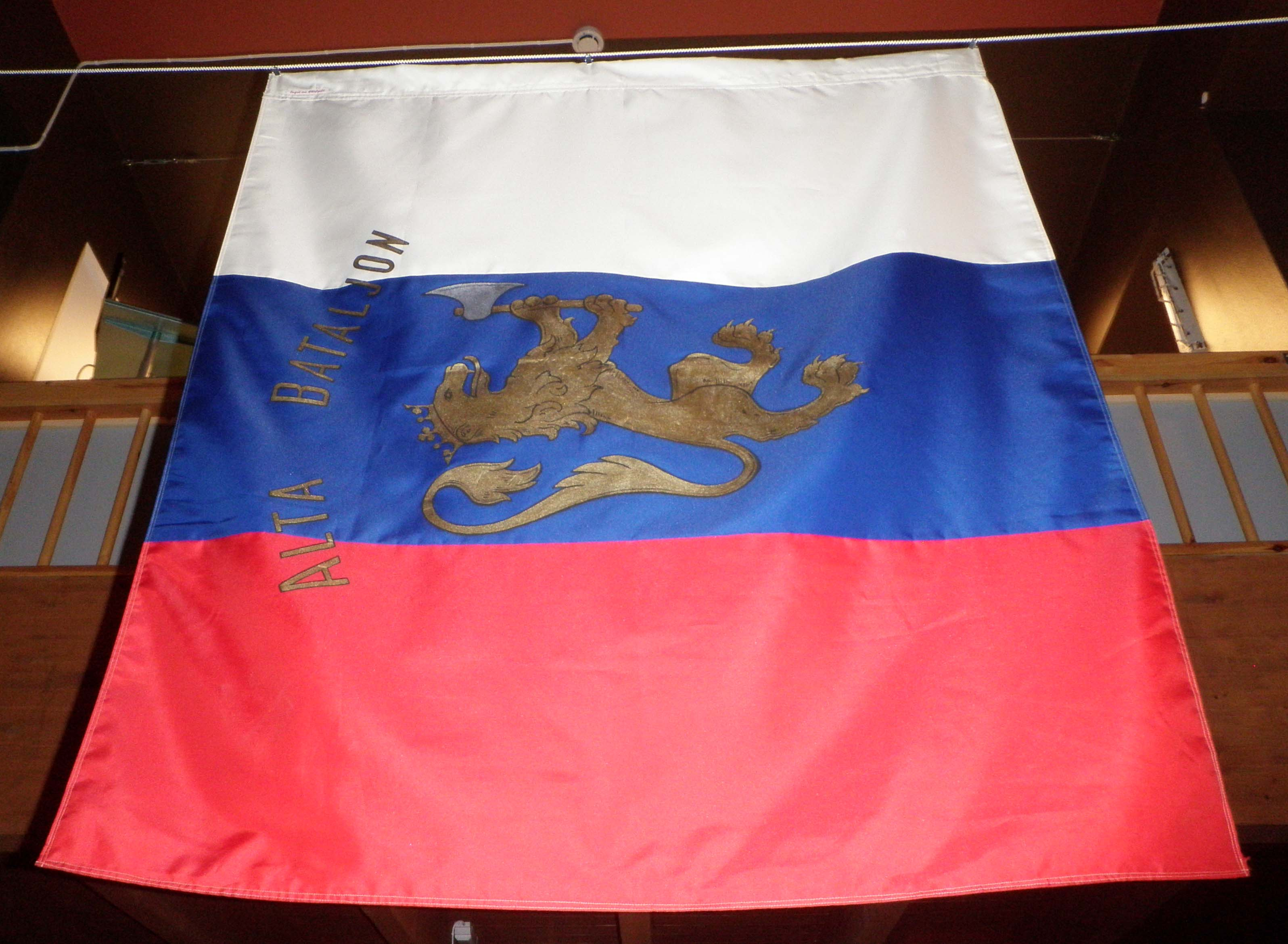
- Pre-1940 battalion standard on display at the War Museum in Narvik.
- Active: 1898–1994
- Country: Norway
- Branch: Norwegian Army
- Type: Infantry
- Size: 900
- Garrison/HQ: Altagård, Alta
- Engagements: Second World War: Norwegian Campaign; Battles of Narvik; Battle of Gratangen

Commanders
- Notable commanders: Arne Dagfin Dahl

The Alta Battalion (Norwegian: Alta bataljon) was an independent battalion within the Norwegian 6th Division based in the village of Alta in Alta Municipality in western Finnmark and commanded by Lt. Colonel Arne Dagfin Dahl. The Alta battalion was multiethnic, being constituted by ethnic Norwegians, Sámi, and Kvens. It made great successes in halting the German invasion of Norway at Narvik.

== Neutrality duty ==
The Alta battalion was mobilized 10 October 1939 to help guard Norway's neutrality in the Second World War and positioned in the border areas of eastern Finnmark during the Finnish Winter War to safeguard the northernmost areas of Norway against possible Soviet aggression. At the time the battalion consisted of around 900 soldiers. Guard and patrol duty in the border areas brought the battalion near the brutality of war and served to harden the men of the unit. After seeing the fighting and burning town in Petsamo the soldiers and officers of the Alta Battalion began to view war as a reality and not merely something found in the history books.

The Alta battalion was then demobilized on 15 January 1940. As the battalion deactivated, Lt. Col. Dahl realised that the international situation was still unstable and the unit might be needed again soon. Thus the soldiers were ordered to tag their uniforms and personal equipment before handing them in for storage. This precautionary measure helped the battalion greatly when it was again needed less than three months later.

After the return to Alta a ski company of ninety volunteers was formed and retained for another two months of training. On average the battalion was not considered especially ski-worthy and most of the soldiers had their only skiing experience from the neutrality duty.

== The invasion ==
After the German invasion of Norway on 9 April 1940 the battalion was once more mobilized, the soldiers making their way to Alta by boats or reindeer sleds, then being transported to the front area by the Hurtigruten steamships SS Dronning Maud and Kong Haakon, and the cargo ship Senja. The battalion departed the pier in Alta on 19 April 1940 and arrived at Sjøvegan on 21 April.

During the coming two-month-long campaign in the mountains north and east of Narvik the battalion spearheaded the 6th Division's advance against the German 3rd Mountain Division in the Narvik area. The standard issue weapons of an infantry squad of the battalion during the campaign was one Madsen light machine gun and Krag–Jørgensen rifles.

When the battalion left for the front it consisted of around 830 men, with 112 horses and 100 ski sleds.

=== Mountain warfare ===
The unit spent the entire two-month campaign conducting offensive operations against general Eduard Dietl's entrenched troops. The at first lightly armed infantrymen attacked through the extreme mountainous terrain of northern Nordland against far better trained German gebirgsjäger and fallschirmjäger troops; the unit was only occasionally supported by artillery or air power, usually only being backed up by the unit's 18 Colt M/29 heavy machine guns and its few 81 mm mortars. On the German side the Luftwaffe became progressively more active in the campaign as the Germans recruited collaborators who constructed new air bases in the more southerly regions of the country. Especially important for the Luftwaffe's ability to support the German forces on the Narvik Front was the rapid improvement of Værnes air base, giving the German bombers much more time to operate over the northern front lines.

=== Success on the Narvik front ===
Nevertheless, by early June 1940, in co-operation with French and Polish land forces, as well the RAF, the Royal Navy and the French and Polish navies, the 6th Division had pushed the German invaders out of the vital port of Narvik and forced them into a small pocket by the Swedish border. In the mountainous inland areas of the front the Alta Battalion was continuously on the attack, suffering many casualties in the process of throwing back the crack German troops. During the last phase of the fighting Luftwaffe bombers steadily increased their attacks against the allied forces, while the Norwegians deployed their few Fokker C.V light bombers and Heinkel He 115 and Marinens Flyvebaatfabrikk M.F.11 seaplanes in support of the offensive. The elderly Fokker biplanes proved themselves to be surprisingly effective at low level bombing of German positions. The RAF provided a certain extent of fighter cover with the Gloster Gladiators of No. 263 Squadron RAF and the Hawker Hurricanes of No. 46 Squadron RAF, although these were too few to continuously patrol the entire front line.

=== Use of captured weaponry ===
In the last weeks of the fighting the battalion was combat-hardened, and well-equipped because of the large amounts of German equipment captured by the advancing fishermen-farmers and reindeer herders of the Alta Battalion. For the first time ever Norwegian infantry advanced utilizing weapons such as submachine guns and hand grenades. During the last weeks of the campaign the battalion's mortars had been worn out by the constant use, with the base plates often being in need of replacement, hence the capture of German 50 mm and 81 mm mortars was very welcome. A number of German mountain guns that had been air dropped by the Luftwaffe to the besieged 3rd Mountain Division were also seized by the battalion and sent back to Alta. In Alta gunners began training with the captured pieces, the intention being deploying them on the front at the earliest opportunity.

=== The Training Battalion ===
While the Alta Battalion was fighting Dietl's men at the front a training battalion of three companies was formed at Altagård and Banak back in Finnmark. In addition Alta Battalion also formed smaller local forces in western Finnmark, including an air warning unit of fifteen men in Kårhamn. Although the training battalion was supposed to provide replacements and reinforcements for the active battalion the fighting ended before it could see any action.

=== Foreign volunteers ===
During the fighting a small number of trained foreigners joined the battalion, amongst these were nine Estonians that joined up on 19 May.

=== Allied evacuation of Norway ===
As the Alta Battalion and the other formations of the 6th Division prepared for one last push against the beleaguered Germans and Austrians of the 3rd Mountain Division, the Third Reich unleashed Fall Gelb and invaded France and the Low Countries. The German 10 May invasion, and the disastrous consequences of this operation for the Allies, led to the land, sea and air forces committed to the Norwegian Campaign being suddenly withdrawn, with notice given the Norwegian authorities only days before the evacuation.

=== Demobilization ===
Without the support of the RAF and the Royal Navy the Norwegian government lost all hope of prevailing against the Germans, and fled the country with the evacuating Allies. The last order of the evacuating government to the Norwegian units opposing the Nazis was: Demobilise.

=== End position of German forces on the Narvik front ===
After the conclusion of the campaign Eduard Dietl commented that at the time of the Norwegian capitulation his forces would have been able to hold out for only another 24 to 48 hours, after which they would have had to abandon the entire Narvik front and cross into Sweden.

As the still undefeated units of the 6th Division, amongst them the Alta Battalion, marched down from the snow-covered hills on 9 June 1940 many of the soldiers cried tears of bitterness and disappointment that victory had been snatched from them. At 0000hrs 10 June 1940 the ceasefire came into effect. During the early hours of the 10th the soldiers of the battalion marched to Grovfjord, under intermittent air attacks, from where they embarked fishing boats for the journey back to Altagård.

At the capitulation the battalion's archives were removed from Altagård and shipped into exile, initially to the Faroe Islands.

== Casualties during the Norwegian Campaign ==
1. 5 Killed in Action
2. 1 Died of Wounds
3. 36 Wounded in Action
4. 1 Taken prisoner
5. 8 Injured
6. 21 Sick

In all the battalion suffered 71 casualties out of around 900 men during the Norwegian Campaign.

== Post Norwegian Campaign ==
At the end of the Norwegian Campaign the battalion was demobilised and the soldiers returned to their homes and civilian occupations. During the occupation many former members of the battalion were active in the resistance movement, mostly working with gathering intelligence on German forces in Finnmark.

== Bibliography ==
- Dahl, Arne Dagfin (1946). Med Alta bataljon mot tyskerne (in Norwegian). Oslo: Aschehoug.
- Friberg, Leif A. (1991). De grå skipene og de gule bussene (in Norwegian). Finnmark Fylkesrederi og Ruteselskap. ISBN 82-992395-0-8.
- Haga, Arnfinn (1998). Alta bataljon 1940 (in Norwegian). Oslo: J.W. Cappelens Forlag. ISBN 82-02-17629-8.
- Ramberg, S. E. L.; Trygve Andersen; Arvid Petterson (1996). Alta bataljons historie 1898–1995 (in Norwegian). Alta: Alta Battalion. ISBN 82-90579-14-4.
- Sandvik, T. (1965). Operasjonene til lands i Nord-Norge 1940 (in Norwegian).
