= Carl Fleischer =

Carl Fleischer may refer to:

- Carl Gustav Fleischer (1883–1942), Norwegian general
- Carl August Fleischer (born 1936), Norwegian jurist
