= Odd Lindbäck-Larsen =

Norwegian military officer and war historian

- Born: 21 April 1897; Kristiania, Norway
- Died: 18 August 1975 (aged 78); Oslo, Norway
- Spouse: Dagny Kaspara Lund (m. 1927)
- Relatives: Inger Haugan née Lindbäck Larsen (daughter) Tore Lindbekk (son) Kirsten Reinertsen née Lindbäck Larsen (daughter)
- Military career
- Branch: Norwegian Army
- Service years: 1918–1962
- Rank: Major General
- Unit: 6th Division (1936–1940)
- Commands: Agder Infantry Regiment (1946–1952); District Command North Norway (1952–1958)
- Conflicts: Norwegian Campaign: Battles of Narvik
- Awards: (Norway) Commander with star of the Royal Norwegian Order of St. Olav (Norway) St. Olav's Medal With Oak Branch (France) Officier of the Légion d'honneur (Sweden) Commander of the Swedish Order of the Sword
- Other work: War historian

Odd Lindbäck-Larsen (21 April 1897 – 18 August 1975) was a Norwegian military officer and war historian. He participated in the Norwegian Campaign in Northern Norway during the Second World War as the chief-of-staff, under general Fleischer. He spent most of the war in Norwegian and German concentration camps. He continued his military career after the war, eventually with the rank of major general and military attaché in Stockholm. He wrote several books on Norwegian military history.

== Early and personal life ==
Lindbäck-Larsen was born in Kristiania as the son of Ludvig Martinius Larsen and Fanny Olivia Lindbäck. He graduated from Oslo Cathedral School in 1915, from the Norwegian Military Academy in 1918, and from the Norwegian Military College in 1921. He was a candidate at the general staff (Norwegian: Generalstaben) from 1922 to 1926, and adjoint from 1929 to 1933. He resided in Finland for the purpose of studies in 1926, and in Germany in 1933. He married telegraph operator Dagny Kaspara Lund on 25 July 1927. His son, Tore Lindbekk (born 1933), is a sociologist and politician.

== Career ==
=== Pre-war ===
Lindbäck-Larsen was a military attaché in Helsinki from 1934 to 1936. From 1936 he was the chief-of-staff of the 6th Division in Northern Norway.

=== Second World War ===
==== Norwegian Campaign and aftermath ====
Lindbäck-Larsen participated in the Norwegian Campaign in Northern Norway during the Second World War as the chief-of-staff and right-hand man of General Carl Gustav Fleischer, the commander of the 6th Division. Following the conclusion of the campaign on 10 June 1940 and the departure to exile in the United Kingdom of General Carl Gustav Fleischer, Lindbäck-Larsen became the military chief-of-staff of Finnmark County Governor Hans Gabrielsen. In this respect Lindbäck-Larsen commanded a Norwegian border guard force of two infantry battalions and an artillery battery. The border forces had been allowed by the Germans in the capitulation agreement to remain stationed in Eastern Finnmark as a safe-guard against the Soviet Union after the Norwegian capitulation. Plans were made by General Otto Ruge to use the 1,600–1,700 men strong border guard to rebuild a Norwegian elite army in Finnmark, outside of German control. The border guard was however ordered to be dissolved by the Germans in July 1940.

==== Imprisonment ====
Lindbäck-Larsen was arrested by the Germans in November 1940 and incarcerated for the rest of the war, first at Møllergata 19 prison, then at Grini concentration camp, and finally at Sachsenhausen concentration camp in Germany. Lindbäck-Larsen was never convicted of anything and was referred to by the Germans as Reichskommissar Josef Terboven's personal prisoner, the two having clashed before Lindbäck-Larsen's arrest.

=== Post-war ===
After the war he continued his military career. From 1946 to 1952 he was in charge of Agder Infantry Regiment. From 1952 he held the rank of Major General and was the commander-in-chief of District Command North Norway. From 1958 to 1962 he was a military attaché in Stockholm. He was decorated Commander with Star of the Royal Norwegian Order of St. Olav in 1958. He was also awarded the St. Olav's Medal With Oak Branch and made a Commander of the Swedish Order of the Sword and an Officier of the Légion d'honneur. He wrote several books, including a book on military psychology (Militær psykologi. 1932.), about the Norwegian Army in 1814 (Den norske hær og 1814. 1945.), and a book on the Norwegian Campaign in 1940 (Krigen i Norge 1940. 1965.).

He died in Oslo in August 1975.

== Selected works ==
- Skandinavias sikkerhet. Bidrag til problemets belysning. 1932.
- Militær psykologi. 1932.
- Den norske hær og 1814. 1945.
- 6. divisjon. 1946.
- Krigen i Norge 1940. 1965.
- Veien til katastrofen. 1973.
