= Carl Gustav Fleischer =

Norwegian general (1883–1942)

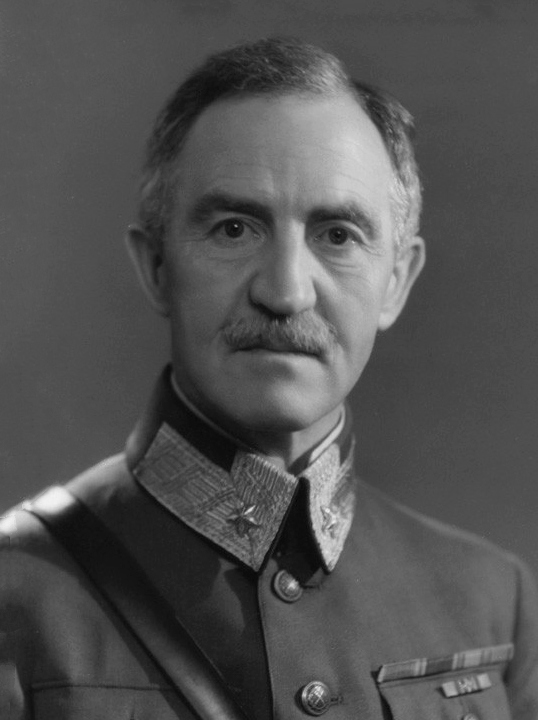
- Carl Gustav Fleischer in 1940
- Born: 28 December 1883; Bjørnør Rectory, Søndre Trondhjem
- Died: 19 December 1942 (aged 58); Ottawa, Ontario, Canada
- Burial place: Vår Frelsers gravlund, Oslo
- Spouse: Antonie "Toni" Charlotte Hygen (m. 1919–1942) (his death)
- Relatives: Carl Edvard Fleischer (father); Johanne Sophie Fergstad (mother); Andreas Fleischer (brother)
- Military career
- Allegiance: Norway
- Branch: Norwegian Army
- Service years: 1905–1942
- Rank: Major General
- Commands: • Company 4 Royal Guards • 14th Infantry Regiment • 6th Division • Norwegian Army in exile • Norwegian forces in Canada
- Conflicts: Second World War: Norwegian Campaign
- Awards: (Norway) War Cross with sword (Poland) Virtuti Militari (France) Croix de Guerre (United Kingdom) Knight Commander of The Order of the Bath

Carl Gustav Fleischer KCB (28 December 1883 – 19 December 1942) was a Norwegian general and is considered first land commander to win a major victory against the Germans in the Second World War. Having followed the Norwegian government into exile at the end of the Norwegian Campaign, Fleischer committed suicide after being bypassed for appointment as commander-in-chief of the Norwegian Armed Forces in exile and being sent to the insignificant post as commander of Norwegian forces in Canada.

== Early and personal life ==
Fleischer was born in the rectory in Bjørnør Municipality (now part of Åfjord Municipality in Trøndelag county) as the son of the Church of Norway pastor Carl Edvard Fleischer (1843–1885) and Johanne Sophie Fergstad (1850–1926). After his father died, Fleischer moved with his mother to grow up in Trondheim. His childhood home was one characterized by Christianity, simplicity and frugality.

His ancestors had migrated from Elbing in East Prussia to Norway, first with Tobias Fleischer (1630–1690) who found a position in Kongsberg. The current lineage is descended from Tobias' nephew Herman Reinhold Fleischer (1656–1712), who also had notable children in Denmark. Carl Gustav Fleischer was a descendant of Herman's son Philip Johan Fleischer (1699–1763). Notable relatives include Philip's brother Baltzer Fleischer and grandnephew Palle Rømer Fleischer, and Carl Gustav's brother, bishop Andreas Fleischer. Carl Gustav Fleischer was also a more distant relative of Carl August Fleischer, Nanna Fleischer, Agnes Fleischer and August Fleischer.

Carl Gustav Fleischer married Antonie "Toni" Charlotte Hygen (1888–1947) in 1919 in Kristiania. In his spare time Fleischer enjoyed watercolor painting and trout fishing.

== Military career ==
=== Pre-Second World War ===
Motivated by economic uncertainties, Fleischer joined the Norwegian Military Academy and graduated as the second best student in 1905. The academy instilled in young Fleischer a strong belief in that the first task of a military officer was to defend his country and that regulations were to be considered standing orders in critical situations.

In 1917 Fleischer made the rank of captain.

In 1919-1923 he was the staff officer of the Norwegian 6th Division before becoming Commanding Officer of the 14th Infantry Regiment (IR 14) in Mosjøen. While serving in North Norway Fleischer became an avid writer of military manuals and worked continually on developing the Norwegian Armed Forces in line with the special prerequisites caused by the Norwegian nature and society.

From 1909 to 1933 he held various positions in the Norwegian General Staff. In addition he served as a captain and commanded Company 4 of the Norwegian Royal Guards in 1926–1929, chief of the Commanding General's staff of adjutants in 1933-1934 and as a teacher at the Norwegian Defence Staff College in 1928–1934. He also edited the military journal Norsk Militært Tidsskrift. During his time at the General Staff Fleischer warned of the possibility of a surprise attack on central areas of Norway. He also stated that the best way of confronting such an attack was a combination of defending coastal outposts while the main forces mobilised in rear areas in the interior of the country.

In 1930 he was promoted to the rank of major, and in 1934 became a colonel, assuming command of the Sør-Hålogaland Regiment (Infantry Regiment 14).

=== Second World War ===
==== Background and strategy ====
On 16 January 1939 Fleischer was made Major General (generalmajor) and Commanding Officer of the Norwegian 6th Division, the position that would lead him to become the first allied general to defeat the Wehrmacht in a head-on land confrontation. January 1940 saw Fleischer appointed by royal resolution as commander-in-chief of North Norway in case of war.

After the Winter War between Finland and Russia broke out in November 1939, the 6th Division was mobilised and Fleischer repeatedly took the initiative to encourage the Norwegian government to increase the country's military readiness in North Norway. Included amongst these initiatives were wide-ranging measures against the region's communists. Fleischer's distrust of the Soviet Union continued to show itself throughout the following Norwegian Campaign in 1940, when he kept substantial forces at the Soviet border in eastern Finnmark despite a desperate need of reinforcements at the front line at Narvik against Maj. Gen. Eduard Dietl's Gebirgsjäger forces.

In 1940, following the German invasion of Norway General Fleischer was appointed commander-in-chief of the Norwegian armed forces in North Norway. At the time of the attack on 9 April 1940 Fleischer was at Vadsø in Finnmark as part of an inspection journey together with his chief of staff, Major Odd Lindbäck-Larsen. When message of the invasion reached him the area was in the middle of a ferocious blizzard. Due to the extreme weather Fleischer could not leave Vadsø either by Hurtigruten ship or naval aircraft, and had to stay overnight. County Governor of Finnmark Hans Gabrielsen invited Fleischer to stay at the governor's mansion. After discussing the situation with Gabrielsen, Fleischer managed to set off for Tromsø the next day, arriving there by M.F.11 naval aircraft after flying in terrible conditions. From Tromsø he issued orders for a total civilian and military mobilization and declared Northern Norway a theatre of war. He handed over most of the civilian powers to the respective County Governors in Troms and Finnmark, Hans Gabrielsen taking all civilian power in Northern Norway after the death of the County Governor of Troms a few days after the invasion. Fleischer's strategic plan was to first wipe out the German forces at Narvik and then transfer his division to Nordland to meet a German advance from Trøndelag. Fleischer valued offensive actions against enemy forces, using the unique nature of the Norwegian terrain to carry out attacks against an enemy's flanks and rear. General Fleischer had already in 1934 opposed the concept of fighting delaying actions while waiting for Allied reinforcements, a tactic on which General Otto Ruge relied during his defence of the vital Eastern Norway region.

==== Operations in 1940 ====
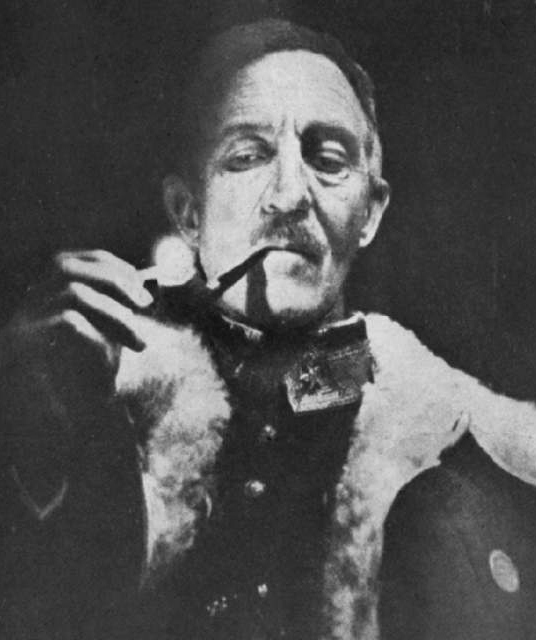
Carl Gustav Fleischer in 1940

As commander of the 6th Division, Maj. Gen. Carl Gustav Fleischer coordinated Norwegian, French, Polish and British forces in the recapturing of Narvik on 28 May from Maj. Gen. Eduard Dietl's German 3rd Mountain Division. The victory was accomplished despite shifting allied strategies and leadership. Following the evacuation of southern Norway Fleischer was embroiled in conflicts with the political and military leadership arriving from the abandoned southern parts of the country. The General's hard-headed and uncompromising style did not help in this regard.

Narvik was the first major allied infantry victory in the Second World War. Unfortunately for the Norwegians, following the German invasion of France and the Low Countries on 10 May 1940, the Allied task force was withdrawn in early June. Without the support from the Allies, the Norwegian Army alone would not be able to defend its positions and a capitulation agreement for mainland Norway was signed. The Germans reoccupied Narvik on 9 June.

As the Norwegian forces in mainland Norway were about to surrender, General Fleischer was ordered to follow King Haakon VII and the Cabinet Nygaardsvold into exile in the United Kingdom, having been made commander of the Norwegian army in exile on 7 June 1940. In the company of his wife he left Norway on 8 June, on board the patrol vessel Fridtjof Nansen.

==== Exile ====
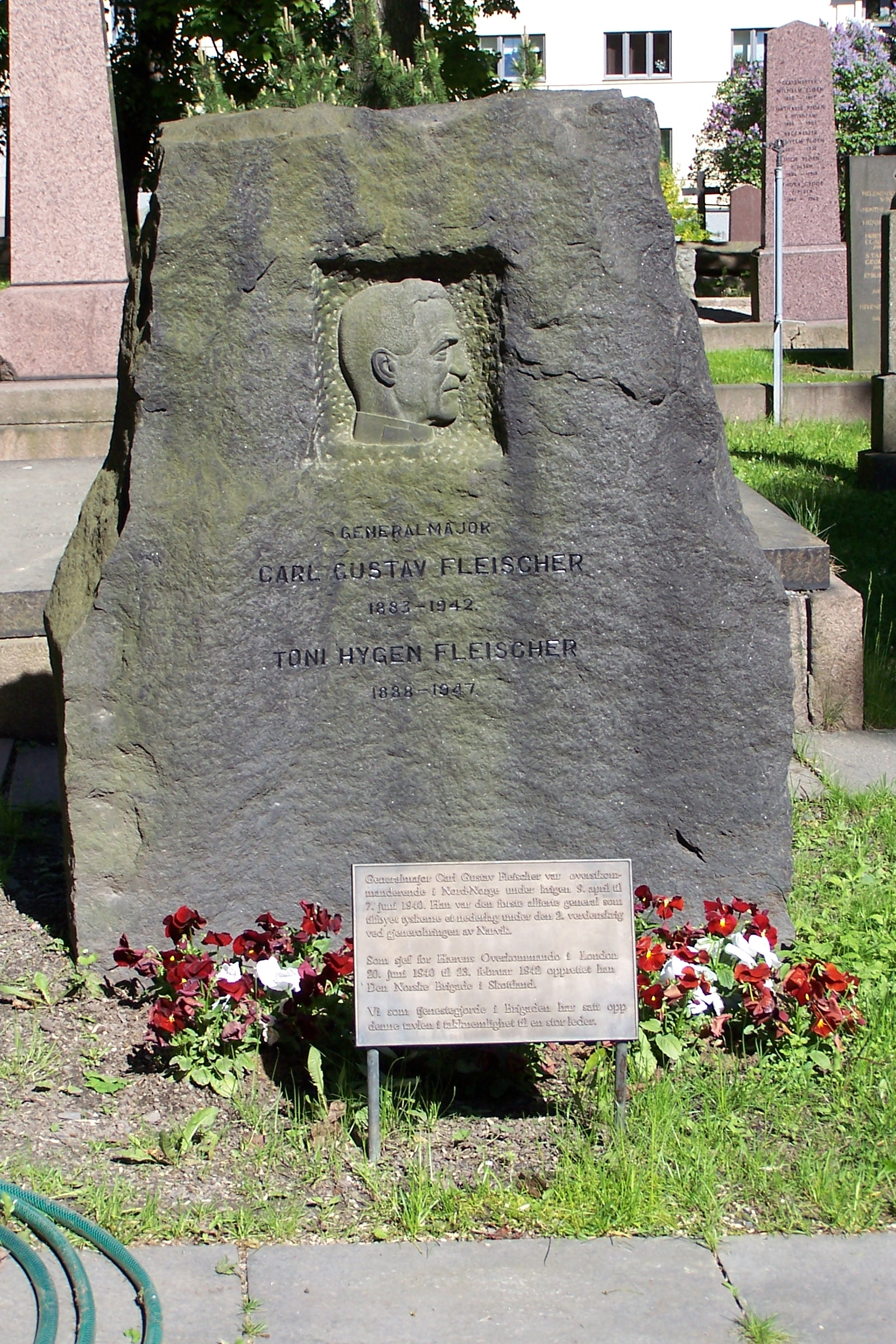
General Fleischer's gravestone at Vår Frelsers gravlund.

During his exile in the United Kingdom, General Fleischer quickly built up a Norwegian infantry brigade based in Dumfries, Scotland, from June 1940. However, he soon got at odds with the Norwegian political leadership in exile due to his strong headed attitudes and unwillingness to compromise. He also became controversial in factions of the cabinet due to his support of British commando raids on the Norwegian coast, even stating his willingness to personally participate in the attacks on the German occupying forces in Norway. While stationed in the UK, he received a number of allied awards. Among these were the Polish Virtuti Militari for bravery, the French Croix de Guerre, and appointment by the British as a Knight Commander of the Order of the Bath.

Most likely because of a personal antagonism due to this fact, General Fleischer was bypassed when the exile government of prime minister Johan Nygaardsvold in 1942 decided to recreate the post of commander-in-chief of the Norwegian Armed Forces.

This post had existed temporarily during the 1940 campaign, but General Otto Ruge, who had been commander-in-chief during the campaign, stayed in Norway and surrendered with his troops. Instead of Fleischer, the cabinet promoted Major Wilhelm von Tangen Hansteen, the young defence attaché in Helsinki, Finland directly to general and gave him the post. In response to this act Fleischer delivered his resignation.

The cabinet ordered General Fleischer to take up a new post as commander of Norwegian forces in Canada. Apart from the Royal Norwegian Air Force's training base Little Norway near Toronto, which was already headed by Ole Reistad, and a school for merchant marine gunners at Lunenburg near Halifax, Nova Scotia, there were no Norwegian forces in Canada. A plan to create a Norwegian Army in Canada of expatriate Norwegian Americans came to nothing.

Before leaving for Canada Fleischer inspected the Norwegian garrison on the distant Norwegian island Jan Mayen in the Atlantic Ocean. The General concluded that the garrison was too small to defend anything more than the midsection of the island, leaving several landing beaches open to the Germans during the relatively calm summer months. Based on his observations Fleischer reported that the garrison should be reinforced during the summer, a small garrison being sufficient during winter. He also inspected the Norwegian forces based on Iceland.

=== Suicide and aftermath ===
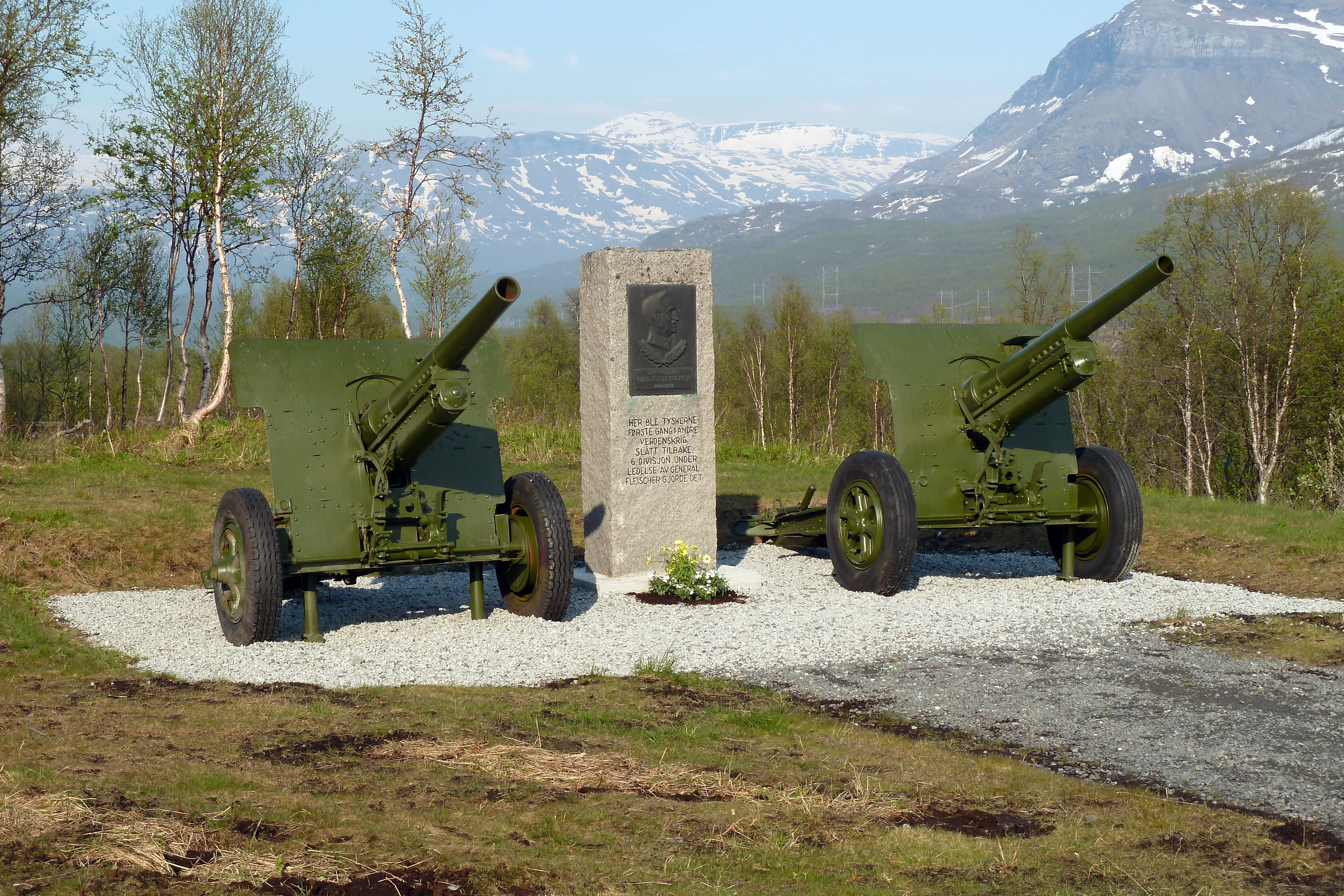
Memorial to Fleischer and the 6th Division at Lapphaugen in Troms, Norway. The memorial stone is flanked by heavily modernized ex-German 10.5 cm leFH 16 field howitzers.

On 1 December 1942, General Fleischer was ordered to the position of military attaché to Washington, D.C. This was another obvious humiliation, since usually officers of the ranks of major or lieutenant-colonel served in this role. Being too much for him to swallow, he shot himself with his own gun through the heart on 19 December 1942. He was found by his adjutant Lieutenant Richard Brinck-Johnsen, who brought the urn with the General's ashes to London in a Liberator aircraft. In London Brinck-Johnsen was ordered to keep the circumstances of Fleischer's death secret. Only in 1995 did Brinck-Johnsen speak out, stating that in his opinion Fleischer had taken his own life in sorrow of being set aside and not being needed by anyone.

Still disputed today, it is thought that one of the reasons for sending him to Canada was that he favoured a series of coastal raids against Norway to hamper German use of the occupied nation. Fleischer also wanted to build substantial army forces abroad and employ them in active operations against the German occupying forces in Norway, something that was in direct conflict with the more passive strategy favoured by Cabinet Nygaardsvold. The prevailing view in the rest of the Cabinet was to build air and naval forces that could be used directly with Allied forces, as they feared such raids would provoke the Germans into severe punitive actions against the local populace, such as they did after the Telavåg incident.

Harstad (Gen. Fleischers gate), Bodø (General Fleischers gate), Bardufoss (General Fleischers veg) and Eiksmarka (General Fleischers vei) all have streets named after the general.

== Bibliography ==
- Barr, Susan (2003). Jan Mayen: Norges utpost i vest: øyas historie gjennom 1500 år. Schibsted. ISBN 82-300-0029-8.
- Fleischer, Carl Gustav (1947). Efterlatte papirer (in Norwegian). Tønsberg: Tønsberg Aktietrykkeris Forlag.
- Haga, Arnfinn (1998). Alta bataljon 1940 (in Norwegian). Oslo: J.W. Cappelens Forlag. ISBN 82-02-17629-8.
- Hovland, Torkel (2000). General Carl Gustav Fleischer: Storhet og fall (in Norwegian) (3rd ed.). Oslo: Aschehoug.
- Hermansen, Max, ed. (2008). Hardt Styrbord: Glimt fra norsk sjøkrigshistorie (in Norwegian). Oslo: Sjømilitære Samfunds forlag. ISBN 978-82-997703-0-9.
- Ording, Arne; Johnson, Gudrun; Garder, Johan (1951). Våre falne 1939-1945 (in Norwegian). Vol. 1. Oslo: Norwegian government. Archived from the original on 24 July 2011.
