= Gratangen Church =

- Gratangen kirke
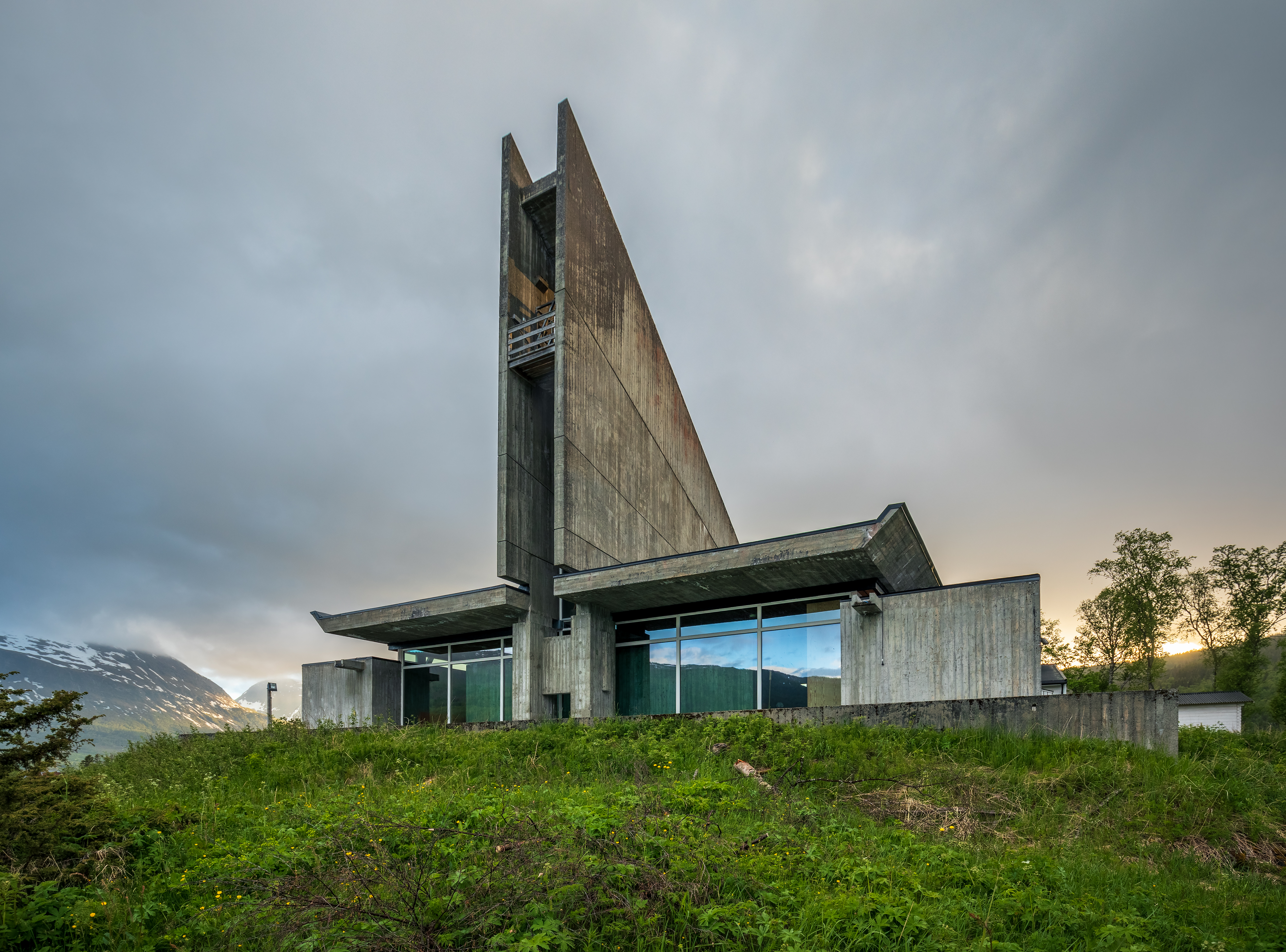
- View of the church
- Gratangen Church
- 68.690045°N 17.5519815°E
- Location: Gratangen Municipality, Troms
- Country: Norway
- Denomination: Church of Norway
- Churchmanship: Evangelical Lutheran

History
- Status: Parish church
- Founded: 1971
- Consecrated: 1971

Architecture
- Functional status: Active
- Architect: Oskar Norderval
- Architectural type: Long church
- Completed: 1971 (55 years ago)

Specifications
- Capacity: 220
- Materials: Concrete

Administration
- Diocese: Nord-Hålogaland
- Deanery: Trondenes prosti
- Parish: Gratangen
- Norwegian Cultural Heritage Site
- Type: Church
- Status: Not protected
- ID: 84409

Gratangen Church (Norwegian: Gratangen kirke) is a parish church of the Church of Norway in Gratangen Municipality in Troms county, Norway. It is located in the village of Årstein, along the shore of the Gratangen fjord. It is the church for the Gratangen parish which is part of the Trondenes prosti (deanery) in the Diocese of Nord-Hålogaland. The modern, concrete and glass church was built in a rectangular design in 1971 using designs drawn up by the architect Oskar Norderval (the son of Bishop Monrad Norderval). The church seats about 220 people.

On the flat roof of the church, there are two triangular vertical concrete slabs that stand close to one another, pointing to the east towards the fjord. In between the two slabs hang the church bells. They are designed to look like a sail on a boat.

== See also ==
- List of churches in Nord-Hålogaland
