= Oslo Militære Samfund =

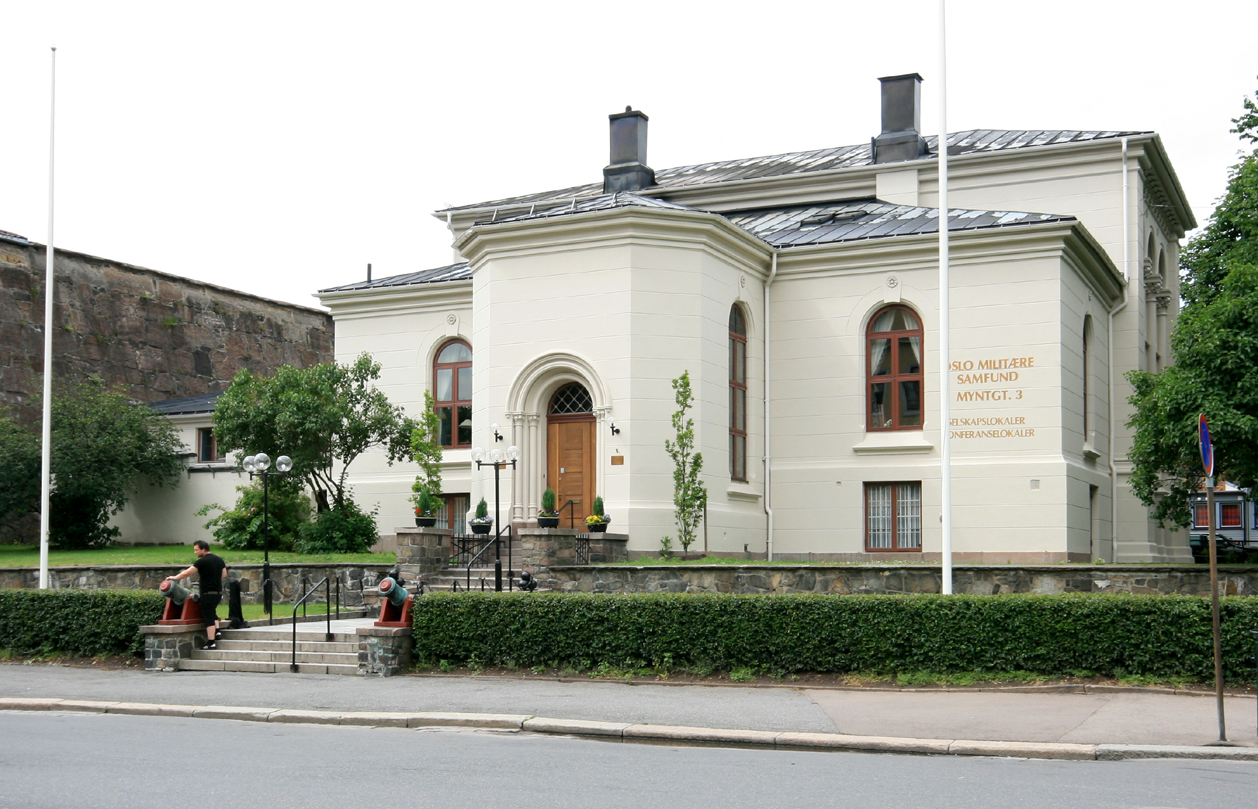
Oslo Militære Samfund, Myntgt. 3, Oslo (architect Wilhelm von Hanno)

Oslo Militære Samfund ("Oslo Military Society") is a Norwegian society of military commissioned officers founded in 1825.

The society has published the magazine Norsk Militært Tidsskrift since 1835. Its location at Myntgt. 3 in Oslo was built in 1878, and designed by architect Wilhelm von Hanno.
