= Ørnulf Dahl =

Norwegian military officer

Ragnvald Ørnulf Rolsdorph Dahl (15 February 1900 – 8 December 1971) was a Norwegian military officer. He was born in Hamar, and was a brother of Arne Dagfin Dahl. He served at the Norwegian Legation in Finland in 1940, at the Norwegian Legation in Stockholm from 1940 to 1944, and at the Norwegian High Command in London from 1944 to 1945. As Colonel he headed Brigade 481 of the Independent Norwegian Brigade Group in Germany in 1948. He was promoted Major General in 1955, and head of the 1st Division. From 1956 Commander of the Allied Landforces Norway. From 1961 to 1968 he was commander of Akershus Fortress. He was decorated Commander of the Order of St. Olav in 1965.
