= Kjell Grandhagen =

Norwegian military officer (1954–2019)

- Born: 7 October 1954; Oslo, Norway
- Died: 3 May 2019 (aged 64); Lørenskog, Norway
- Military career
- Allegiance: Norway
- Branch: Norwegian Army
- Rank: General

Kjell Grandhagen (7 October 1954 – 3 May 2019) was a Norwegian military officer. He was born in Oslo.

He served as head of the Norwegian Military Academy from 1996 to 1999. From 2002 to 2003 he headed the 6th Division, with the rank of major general. From 2006 he served at the Ministry of Defence, as assistant military secretary with the rank of lieutenant general. In 2009 he was appointed head of the Norwegian Intelligence Service. He died from multiple myeloma.
