= Gratangen Municipality =

Municipality in Troms, Norway

Gratangen Municipality Gratangen kommune Rivttága suohkan
- Municipality
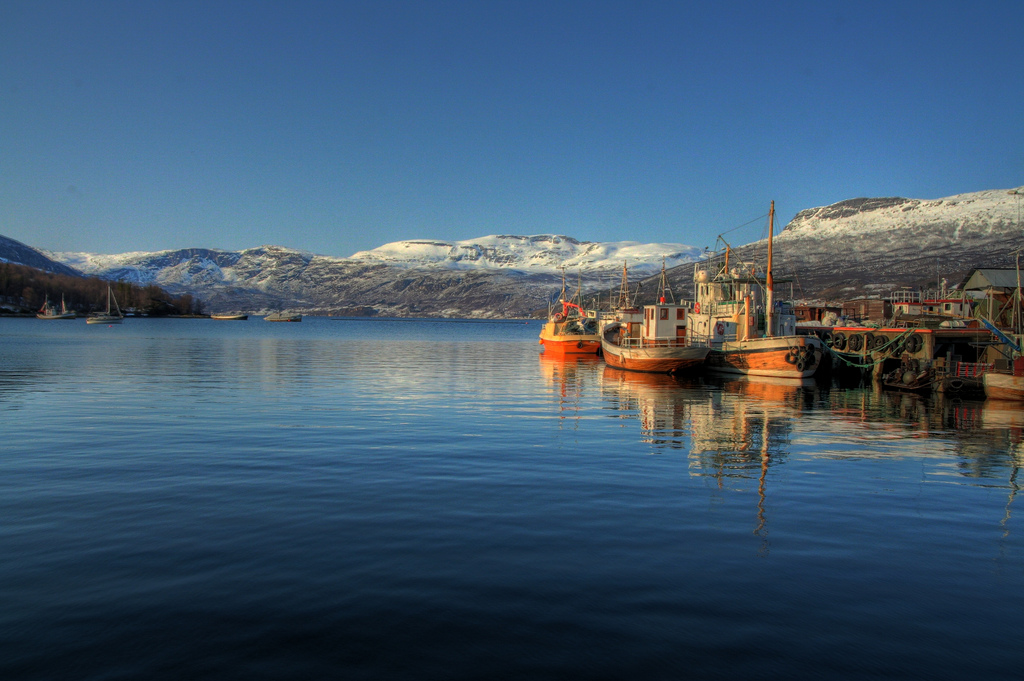

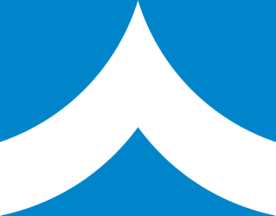
- Flag Coat of arms

- Troms within Norway

- Gratangen within Troms
- Coordinates: 68°41′24″N 17°32′30″E
- Country: Norway
- County: Troms
- District: Central Hålogaland
- Established: 1 July 1926
  - Preceded by: Ibestad Municipality
- Administrative centre: Årstein

Government
  - Mayor (2019): Anita Karlsen (Sp)

Area
  - Total: 312.76 km^{2} (120.76 sq mi)
  - Land: 305.56 km^{2} (117.98 sq mi)
  - Water: 7.20 km^{2} (2.78 sq mi) 2.3%
  - Rank: #261 in Norway
- Highest elevation: 1,332.36 m (4,371.3 ft)

Population (2024)
  - Total: 1,070
  - Rank: #331 in Norway
  - Density: 3.4/km^{2} (8.8/sq mi)
  - Change (10 years): ▼ −5.7%
- Demonym: Gratangsværing

Official language
  - Norwegian form: Neutral
- Time zone: UTC+01:00 (CET)
  - Summer (DST): UTC+02:00 (CEST)
- ISO 3166 code: NO-5516
- Website: Official website

Gratangen (Norwegian) or Rivtták (Northern Sami) is a municipality in Troms county, Norway. It is part of the traditional region of Central Hålogaland. The administrative centre of the municipality is the village of Årstein.

The 313-square-kilometre (121 sq mi) municipality is the 261st largest by area out of the 357 municipalities in Norway. Gratangen Municipality is the 331st most populous municipality in Norway with a population of 1,070. The municipality's population density is 3.4 inhabitants per square kilometre (8.8/sq mi) and its population has decreased by 5.7% over the previous 10-year period.

The largest settlement in the municipality is Årstein, which is located approximately 60 kilometres (37 mi) north of the town of Narvik and 85 kilometres (53 mi) east of the town of Harstad. Other villages in Gratangen include Elvenes, Fjordbotn, and Hilleshamn. The European route E6 highway runs through the southeastern part of the municipality.

== General information ==
The municipality of Gratangen was established on 1 July 1926 when it was separated from the large Ibestad Municipality. The initial population of Gratangen was 1,967. The municipal boundaries have not changed since that time.

On 1 January 2020, the municipality became part of the newly formed Troms og Finnmark county. Previously, it had been part of the old Troms county. On 1 January 2024, the Troms og Finnmark county was divided and the municipality once again became part of Troms county.

=== Name ===
The municipality (originally the parish) is named after the Gratangen fjord (Old Norse: Grjótangr). The first element is grjót which means "stone". The last element is angr which means "fjord".

On 16 February 2024, the national government approved a resolution to add a co-equal, official Sami language name for the municipality: Rivttága suohkan. The spelling of the Sami language name changes depending on how it is used. It is called Rivtták when it is spelled alone, but it is Rivttága suohkan when using the Sami language equivalent to "Gratangen Municipality".

=== Coat of arms ===
The coat of arms was granted on 15 June 1990. The official blazon is "Azure, a chevron embowed argent" (Norwegian: I blått en innbøyd sølv sparre). This means the arms have a blue field (background) and the charge is a curved chevron. The chevron has a tincture of argent which means it is commonly colored white, but if it is made out of metal, then silver is used. The blue color in the field symbolizes the blue sky (on top) and the Gratangen fjord and sea (on the bottom). The chevron was chosen to represent the snowy mountain peaks. The arms were designed by Even Jarl Skoglund.

=== Churches ===
The Church of Norway has one parish (sokn) within Gratangen Municipality. It is part of the Trondenes prosti (deanery) in the Diocese of Nord-Hålogaland.

Churches in Gratangen Municipality
Parish (sokn)	Church name	Location of the church	Year built
Gratangen	Gratangen Church	Årstein	1971

== History ==
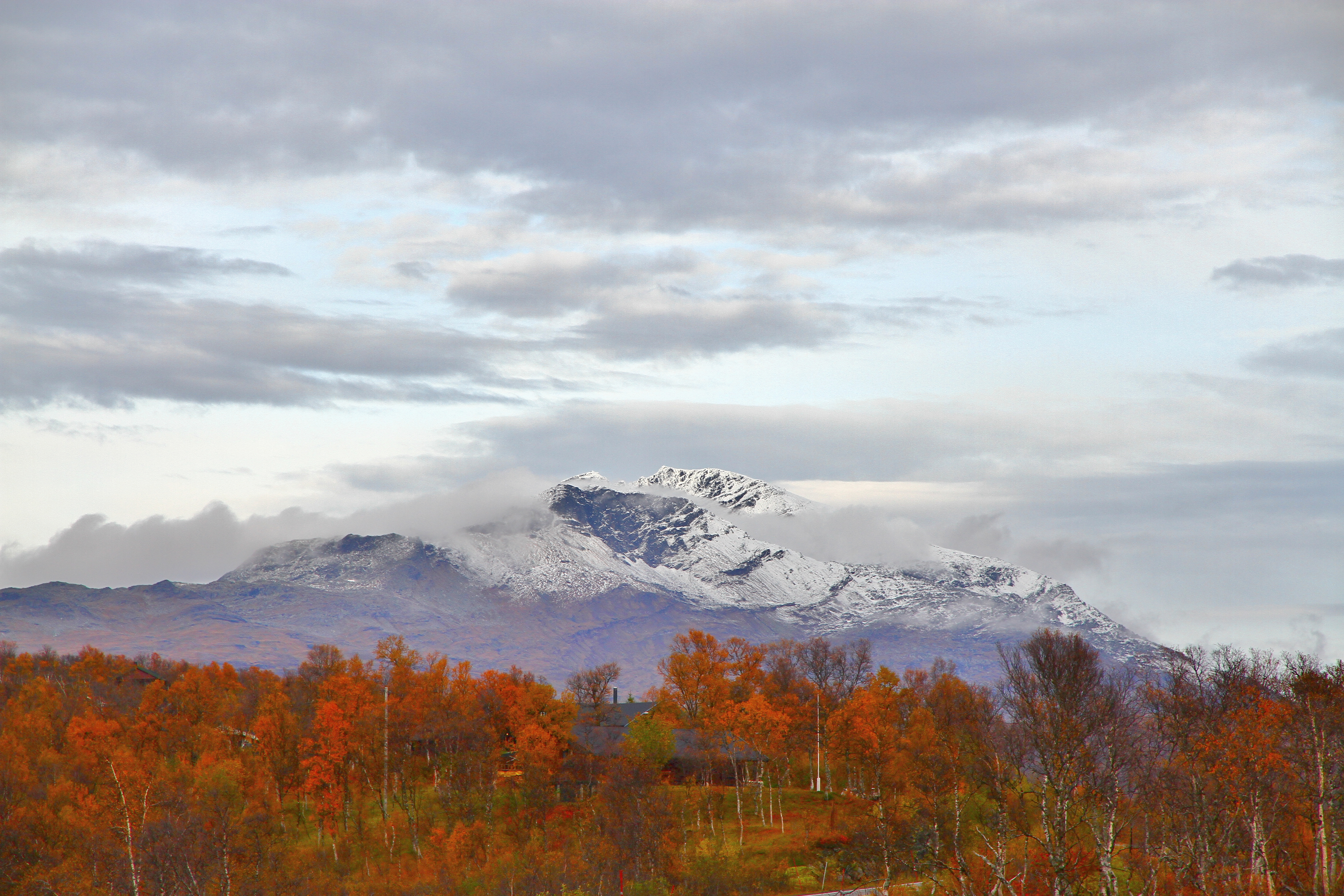
View of the mountains of Gratangen

Gratangen was the site of the Battle of Gratangen, one of the first battles between the German 3rd Mountain Division under Eduard Dietl and the Norwegian 6th Division under General Carl Gustav Fleischer after the German invasion of Norway on 9 April 1940.

== Geography ==
The municipality encompasses the land on both sides of the Gratangen and southeast of the Astafjorden. The municipality borders Tjeldsund Municipality to the west, Ibestad Municipality (across the Astafjorden) to the north, Lavangen Municipality to the east, and Narvik Municipality (in Nordland county) to the south.

The municipality is very mountainous, with only one third of the land being below the tree line of 250 to 300 metres (820 to 980 ft) above sea level. Most of the livable land is a narrow area along both sides of the fjord, several side valleys that branch away from the fjord, plus the Fjordbotn area at the head of the fjord. The highest point in the municipality is the 1,332.36-metre (4,371.3 ft) tall mountain Vassdalfjellet which is located on the border with Narvik Municipality.

=== Climate ===
Climate data for Årstein
Month	Jan	Feb	Mar	Apr	May	Jun	Jul	Aug	Sep	Oct	Nov	Dec	Year
Daily mean °C (°F)	−6.2 (20.8)	−5.4 (22.3)	−2.6 (27.3)	1.4 (34.5)	6.7 (44.1)	10.8 (51.4)	13.0 (55.4)	11.9 (53.4)	7.2 (45.0)	2.6 (36.7)	−2.1 (28.2)	−4.6 (23.7)	2.7 (36.9)
Average precipitation mm (inches)	87 (3.4)	79 (3.1)	62 (2.4)	56 (2.2)	45 (1.8)	55 (2.2)	70 (2.8)	82 (3.2)	111 (4.4)	136 (5.4)	95 (3.7)	102 (4.0)	980 (38.6)
Source: Norwegian Meteorological Institute

== Government ==
Gratangen Municipality is responsible for primary education (through 10th grade), outpatient health services, senior citizen services, welfare and other social services, zoning, economic development, and municipal roads and utilities. The municipality is governed by a municipal council of directly elected representatives. The mayor is indirectly elected by a vote of the municipal council. The municipality is under the jurisdiction of the Midtre Hålogaland District Court and the Hålogaland Court of Appeal.

=== Municipal council ===
The municipal council (Kommunestyre) of Gratangen Municipality is made up of 15 representatives that are elected to four year terms. The tables below show the current and historical composition of the council by political party.

Gratangen kommunestyre 2023–2027
Party name (in Norwegian)	Number of representatives
Labour Party (Arbeiderpartiet)	6
Centre Party (Senterpartiet)	8
Cross-party List for Gratangen (Tverrpolitisk Liste for Gratangen)	1
Total number of members:	15

Gratangen kommunestyre 2019–2023
Party name (in Norwegian)	Number of representatives
Labour Party (Arbeiderpartiet)	3
Centre Party (Senterpartiet)	7
Gratangen Common Political List (Gratangen Fellespolitiske Liste)	3
Cross-Party List for Gratangen (Tverrpolitisk Liste for Gratangen)	2
Total number of members:	15

Gratangen kommunestyre 2015–2019
Party name (in Norwegian)	Number of representatives
Labour Party (Arbeiderpartiet)	7
Centre Party (Senterpartiet)	3
Gratangen Common Political List (Gratangen Fellespolitiske Liste)	2
Gratangen Democratic List (Gratangen Demokratiske Liste)	3
Total number of members:	15

Grantangen kommunestyre 2011–2015
Party name (in Norwegian)	Number of representatives
Labour Party (Arbeiderpartiet)	5
Centre Party (Senterpartiet)	9
Socialist Left Party (Sosialistisk Venstreparti)	1
Total number of members:	15

Gratangen kommunestyre 2007–2011
Party name (in Norwegian)	Number of representatives
Labour Party (Arbeiderpartiet)	8
Progress Party (Fremskrittspartiet)	1
Centre Party (Senterpartiet)	5
Socialist Left Party (Sosialistisk Venstreparti)	1
Total number of members:	15

Gratangen kommunestyre 2003–2007
Party name (in Norwegian)	Number of representatives
Labour Party (Arbeiderpartiet)	8
Progress Party (Fremskrittspartiet)	2
Centre Party (Senterpartiet)	5
Socialist Left Party (Sosialistisk Venstreparti)	2
Total number of members:	17

Gratangen kommunestyre 1999–2003
Party name (in Norwegian)	Number of representatives
Labour Party (Arbeiderpartiet)	6
Progress Party (Fremskrittspartiet)	1
Centre Party (Senterpartiet)	7
Socialist Left Party (Sosialistisk Venstreparti)	1
Gratangen cross-party list (Gratangen tverrpolitiske list)	2
Total number of members:	17

Gratangen kommunestyre 1995–1999
Party name (in Norwegian)	Number of representatives
Labour Party (Arbeiderpartiet)	4
Conservative Party (Høyre)	1
Centre Party (Senterpartiet)	6
Socialist Left Party (Sosialistisk Venstreparti)	2
Inner Gratangen non-party list (Indre Gratangen upolitiske liste)	3
Outer North-Gratangen election list (Ytre Nord-Gratangen valgliste)	1
Total number of members:	17

Gratangen kommunestyre 1991–1995
Party name (in Norwegian)	Number of representatives
Labour Party (Arbeiderpartiet)	6
Conservative Party (Høyre)	1
Centre Party (Senterpartiet)	6
Socialist Left Party (Sosialistisk Venstreparti)	1
Middle and Outer Gratangen with Hilleshamn election list (Midtre og Ytre Gratangen med Hilleshamn valgliste)	1
Inner Gratangen non-party local list (Indre Gratangen upolitiske bygdeliste)	2
Total number of members:	17

Gratangen kommunestyre 1987–1991
Party name (in Norwegian)	Number of representatives
Labour Party (Arbeiderpartiet)	7
Conservative Party (Høyre)	3
Centre Party (Senterpartiet)	2
Socialist Left Party (Sosialistisk Venstreparti)	1
Middle and Outer Gratangen with Hilleshamn local list (Midtre og Ytre Gratangen med Hilleshamn bygdeliste)	4
Total number of members:	17

Gratangen kommunestyre 1983–1987
Party name (in Norwegian)	Number of representatives
Labour Party (Arbeiderpartiet)	3
Socialist Left Party (Sosialistisk Venstreparti)	1
Middle/Outer Gratangen with Hilleshamn local list (Midtre/Ytre Gratangen med Hilleshamn bygdeliste)	4
Inner and Southern Gratangen with Hilleshamn local list (Indre og Søndre Gratangen med Hilleshamn bygdeliste)	7
Inland election list (Innlandets valgliste)	2
Total number of members:	17

Gratangen kommunestyre 1979–1983
Party name (in Norwegian)	Number of representatives
Labour Party (Arbeiderpartiet)	5
Middle Gratangen with Hilleshamn local list (Midtre Gratangen med Hilleshamn bygdeliste)	7
Inner Gratangen non-party election list (Indre Gratangen upolitiske valgliste)	2
Inland election list (Innlandets valgliste)	3
Total number of members:	17

Gratangen kommunestyre 1975–1979
Party name (in Norwegian)	Number of representatives
Labour Party (Arbeiderpartiet)	7
Socialist Left Party (Sosialistisk Venstreparti)	1
Joint list of the Conservative Party (Høyre), Christian Democratic Party (Kristelig Folkeparti), and Centre Party (Senterpartiet)	4
Middle Gratangen with Hilleshamn Non-Party Common List (Midtre Gratangen med Hilleshamn Upolitiske Fellesliste)	4
Inner Gratangen Election List (Indre Gratangen Valgliste)	1
Total number of members:	17

Gratangen kommunestyre 1971–1975
Party name (in Norwegian)	Number of representatives
Labour Party (Arbeiderpartiet)	2
Local List(s) (Lokale lister)	15
Total number of members:	17

Gratangen kommunestyre 1967–1971
Party name (in Norwegian)	Number of representatives
Labour Party (Arbeiderpartiet)	1
Local List(s) (Lokale lister)	16
Total number of members:	17

Gratangen kommunestyre 1963–1967
Party name (in Norwegian)	Number of representatives
Labour Party (Arbeiderpartiet)	4
Conservative Party (Høyre)	1
Local List(s) (Lokale lister)	12
Total number of members:	17

Gratangen herredsstyre 1959–1963
Party name (in Norwegian)	Number of representatives
Labour Party (Arbeiderpartiet)	4
List of workers, fishermen, and small farmholders (Arbeidere, fiskere, småbrukere liste)	4
Local List(s) (Lokale lister)	9
Total number of members:	17

Gratangen herredsstyre 1955–1959
Party name (in Norwegian)	Number of representatives
Labour Party (Arbeiderpartiet)	5
Local List(s) (Lokale lister)	12
Total number of members:	17

Gratangen herredsstyre 1951–1955
Party name (in Norwegian)	Number of representatives
Labour Party (Arbeiderpartiet)	3
Local List(s) (Lokale lister)	13
Total number of members:	16

Gratangen herredsstyre 1947–1951
Party name (in Norwegian)	Number of representatives
Labour Party (Arbeiderpartiet)	7
Local List(s) (Lokale lister)	9
Total number of members:	16

Gratangen herredsstyre 1945–1947
Party name (in Norwegian)	Number of representatives
Labour Party (Arbeiderpartiet)	8
Local List(s) (Lokale lister)	8
Total number of members:	16

Gratangen herredsstyre 1937–1941*
Party name (in Norwegian)	Number of representatives
Labour Party (Arbeiderpartiet)	4
List of workers, fishermen, and small farmholders (Arbeidere, fiskere, småbrukere liste)	3
Local List(s) (Lokale lister)	9
Total number of members:	16
Note: Due to the German occupation of Norway during World War II, no elections were held for new municipal councils until after the war ended in 1945.

=== Mayors ===
The mayor (Norwegian: ordfører) of Gratangen Municipality is the political leader of the municipality and the chairperson of the municipal council. Here is a list of people who have held this position:

- 1926–1929: Mikal Jakobsen
- 1929–1931: O.M. Eilivsen-Thraning
- 1932–1934: Mikal Jakobsen
- 1935–1937: Arthur Heggelund (Ap)
- 1938–1941: Mikal Nilsen
- 1941–1942: Arthur Heggelund (Ap)
- 1942–1942: Ove Seines
- 1942–1942: O.M. Eilivsen-Thraning
- 1942–1945: Christian Selnes
- 1946–1947: Arthur Heggelund (Ap)
- 1948–1951: Øyvind Bahr
- 1952–1961: Anker Nikolaisen (Ap)
- 1962–1967: Alfred Pedersen (Ap)
- 1968–1971: Heiberg Karlsen (LL)
- 1972–1975: Odd Thraning (Ap)
- 1976–1979: Arvid Fjellheim (Ap)
- 1980–1983: Reidar Schjelderup (Sp)
- 1984–1985: Odd Thraning (Ap)
- 1986–1989: Arvid Fjellheim (Ap)
- 1990–1991: Roy-Idar Sandberg (Sp)
- 1992–1993: Håkon Kristiansen (Ap)
- 1994–1999: Roy-Idar Sandberg (Sp)
- 1999–2003: Rita H. Roaldsen (Sp)
- 2003–2003: Håkon Kristiansen (Ap)
- 2003–2011: Eva Ottesen (Ap)
- 2011–2015: Ronny Grindstein (Sp)
- 2015–2019: Eva Ottesen (Ap)
- 2019–present: Anita Karlsen (Sp)
