= Battle of Gratangen =

1940 battle of World War II

Coordinates: 68°40′07″N 17°40′06″E

- Part of the Norwegian campaign of World War II
| Date | 23–25 April 1940 |
| Location | Gratangen, Norway |
| Result | German victory |

Belligerents
| Norway | Germany |

Commanders and leaders
- Overall: Kristian Løken; I/IR12 (1st battalion of Infantry Regiment 12): Nils Christoffer Bøckman

Strength
| I/IR12 | 165 soldiers |

Casualties and losses
| 34 killed 64 wounded 130 captured | 6 killed 16 wounded 3 missing |

The Battle of Gratangen occurred during the first Norwegian counter-attack in the Narvik Campaign. The Norwegian 6th Division gathered forces to push the Germans out of Gratangen Municipality and back towards the town of Narvik. The first attack failed disastrously when the Germans counter-attacked unprepared Norwegian forces, routing a battalion and blunting the first Norwegian advance.

== Background ==
Gratangen was the site of some of the first battles between the German 3rd Mountain Division under Eduard Dietl and the Norwegian 6th Division under General Carl Gustav Fleischer after the German invasion of Norway on 9 April 1940.

After initial German success in surprising and routing a battalion from Trøndelag county, the tide turned and the German were pushed southwards in the direction of Narvik.

== German invasion and Norwegian counter-attacks ==
Transported by ten destroyers from the Kriegsmarine, the German Task Force under command of General der Infanterie Eduard Dietl had occupied Narvik and the important military depots at Elvegårdsmoen in the early hours of 9 April 1940. Sinking the outdated Norwegian coastal defence ships HNoMS Norge and HNoMS Eidsvold with great loss of life and bluffing the Norwegian land forces into surrender.

The Allies counter-attacked by sea and, in the two naval battles of Narvik, the Royal Navy sank all ten German destroyers. The approximately 2,900 shipwrecked German sailors were kitted out with captured Norwegian equipment from Elvegårdsmoen and employed as ground troops in support of Dietl's Gebirgsjäger.

In the meantime, the Norwegians mobilised their forces under the leadership of General Carl Gustav Fleischer.

The Norwegian plan for a counter-attack on the German bridgehead around Narvik was based on pushing towards Elvegårdsmoen and Bjerkvik through Salangsdalen over the hill Lapphaugen with II/IR15 (Second Battalion/Fifteenth Infantry Regiment) in a frontal attack with artillery support on the German forward positions on Lapphaugen. Lapphaugen was believed to be held in company strength. I/IR12 (First Battalion/Twelfth Infantry Regiment) was planned to advance on the German main positions in Gratangsbotn by a surprise march over difficult terrain over Fjordbotneidet. Alta Battalion (an Independent Infantry Battalion) was in divisional reserve but positioned to support I/IR12.

== The battle ==
On 24 April, the II/IR15 started its attack on Lapphaugen but due to extreme weather conditions and German resistance the attack was repulsed.

The Germans, however, decided to abandon their positions on Lapphaugen and Gratangsbotn. In the foul weather, this went unnoticed by the II/IR15. Consequently, this battalion did not push on with the advance.

In wind and heavy snowfall, the I/IR12 crossed the Fjordbotneidet and arrived at Gratangsbotn to find the area cleared of Germans. The soldiers were exhausted after the forced march and went to rest in the farmhouses and barns in Gratangsbotn. For reasons not fully explained, probably a misunderstanding by the battalion's commanding officer, the battalion failed to post a sufficient perimeter security; this was indeed critical as Gratangsbotn geographically is located at the bottom of a kettle with dominating high ground all around.

The Germans did not miss this opportunity and immediately counterattacked with a 165-strong force, using Norwegian civilians as a human shields. Though inferior in numbers, the German attack suppressed the surprised Norwegians with superior firepower from mortars and heavy machine guns. Thirty-four Norwegian soldiers were killed, 64 wounded and 130 taken prisoners. Officer losses were heavy: three out of five company commanders were killed in action, one wounded, the fifth was ill with snow-blindness and did not take active part in the battle. The Germans suffered only six soldiers killed, 16 wounded and three missing.

The surviving Norwegians retreated from Gratangsbotn. The depleted battalion was later reorganised as a reduced battalion with two rifle companies and one support company and participated actively in the rest of the campaign.

== Aftermath ==
Despite soundly defeating I/IR12, the Germans understood that their position in Gratangsbotn was untenable. The fresh Alta Battalion under Arne Dagfin Dahl pressed on from the north and II/IR15 resumed its advance over Lapphaugen.

The Germans therefore abandoned Gratangen soon after the battle.

For the Norwegian forces on the Narvik front, the battle of Gratangen was an early experience of sustained combat. Some Norwegian soldiers had reportedly been reluctant to fire on German troops before the battle. Account of German actions during the fighting, including the alleged use of civilians as human shields, contributed to a hardening of Norwegian attitudes toward the enemy.

== See also ==
- List of Norwegian military equipment of World War II
- List of German military equipment of World War II
