= Årstein =

Village in Gratangen Municipality, Norway

Årstein (Norwegian): Árjogeargi (Northern Sami); Orrageargi (Northern Sami)
- Village
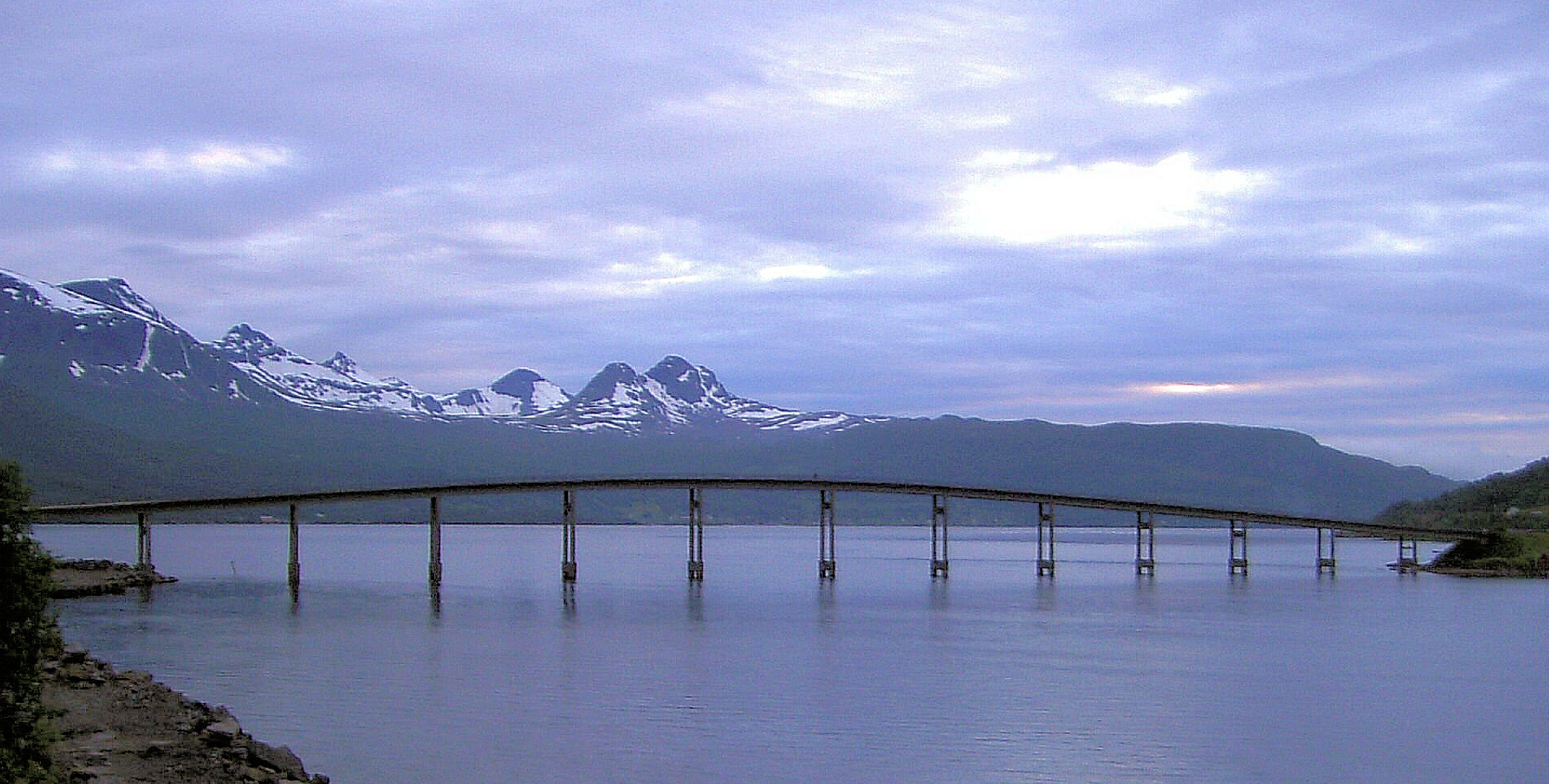
- View of the Årstein bridge over the Gratangsfjorden
- Interactive map of Årstein (Norwegian)
- Location within Troms Location within Norway
- Coordinates: 68°41′25″N 17°32′32″E
- Country: Norway
- Region: Northern Norway
- County: Troms
- District: Central Hålogaland
- Municipality: Gratangen Municipality
- Elevation: 22 m (72 ft)
- Time zone: UTC+01:00 (CET)
  - Summer (DST): UTC+02:00 (CEST)
- Post Code: 9470 Gratangen

Årstein (Norwegian) or Árjogeargi or Orrageargi (Northern Sami) is the administrative centre of Gratangen Municipality in Troms county, Norway. The village is located on the north side of the Gratangsfjorden at the narrowest point along the fjord. The Årstein Bridge crosses the fjord here. The village is located about 6 kilometres (3.7 mi) northwest of the village of Fjordbotn (at the head of the fjord) and about 15 kilometres (9.3 mi) from the village of Hilleshamn (where the Gratangsfjorden empties into the Astafjorden).

The Årstein area has 211 inhabitants (as of 2010), making it the largest urbanized area in the municipality. Gratangen Church is located in the village. It was designed in a modernist style by Oskar Nordeval and opened in 1971.
