= Johannes Henrik Schiøtz =

Norwegian historian

Johannes Henrik Schiøtz (27 November 1884 – 1957) was a Norwegian military officer, museum director and historian.

== Biography ==
He was born in Hamar as a son of banker Jonas Schanche Kielland Schiøtz (1841–1901). He was a brother of Carl Schiøtz and nephew of Hjalmar August Schiøtz, both professors of medicine, and also a nephew of geologist Oskar Emil Schiøtz.

He first marked himself as a military historian. His principal work was a history of Norway's involvement in the Great Northern War, released in three volumes between 1936 and 1955. From 1934 to his death he edited the journal Norsk Militært Tidsskrift. From 1954 to 1956 he was the director of the Norwegian Armed Forces Museum.

Johannes Schiøtz reached the rank of Colonel in 1939. He was involved in the fighting of the Norwegian Campaign in 1940. During the subsequent German occupation of Norway he was arrested by the Nazi authorities as a hostage on 17 January 1942. He was incarcerated at Grini concentration camp, was then sent to Schildberg on 30 December 1942, where he sat as a prisoner-of-war until the camp was liberated.
