= Tore Lindbekk =

Norwegian sociologist and politician

Tore Lindbekk (8 April 1933 – 29 September 2017) was a Norwegian sociologist and politician for the Conservative Party.

He was born in Oslo as the son of Odd Lindbäck-Larsen. He graduated as mag.art. in sociology in 1959, was chairman of the Norwegian Students' Society in 1962, and wrote for the Conservative periodical Minerva. In 1969 he was appointed professor of sociology at the University of Trondheim (later merged and renamed the Norwegian University of Science and Technology). He was dean of his institute from 1981 to 1989.

In politics, he was a member of Trondheim city council from 1976 to 1983, and also a member of Sør-Trøndelag county council.

== Selected bibliography ==
This is a list of his most notable works:

- Skolesosiologi (1973)
- Den populistiske utfordring (1975)
- Skilleveier i forskningspolitikk (1983)
- Samfunnsteori: fra Marx til Giddens (1996)
