= Commemorative Medal of the 1914–1917 African Campaigns =

1914–1917 African Campaigns Commemorative Medal
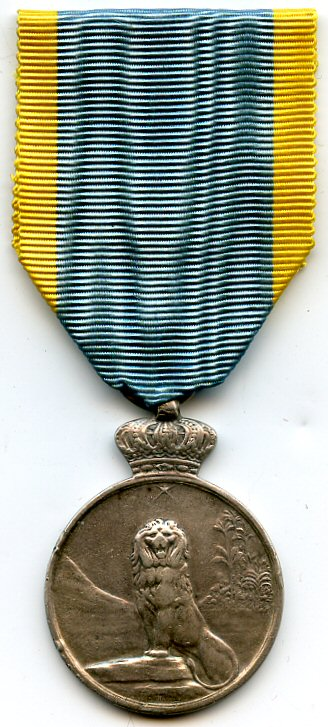
- 1914–1917 African Campaigns Commemorative Medal (obverse)
- Type: War service medal
- Awarded for: Combat service in Africa between 1914 and 1918
- Presented by: Kingdom of Belgium
- Eligibility: Belgian military personnel
- Status: No longer awarded
- Established: 21 February 1917
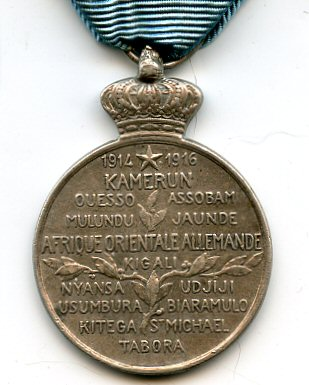
- Reverse of the medal

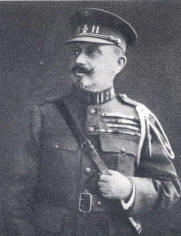
Lieutenant General Charles Baron Tombeur de Tabora, a recipient of the Commemorative Medal of the 1914–1917 African Campaigns

The Commemorative Medal of the African Campaigns 1914–1917 (French: Médaille Commémorative des Campagnes d'Afrique 1914–1917, Dutch: Herinneringsmedaille van de Afrikaanse Veldtochten 1914–1917) was a Belgian military war service medal established by Royal Decree on 21 February 1917 to recognise combat service on the African continent between 1914 and 1918.

It was awarded in silver to Belgian military personnel and in bronze to indigenous personnel who participated in the campaigns in Cameroun, Rhodesia, German East Africa and on the Eastern borders of the Belgian Congo between 1914 and 1918. In 1931, the clasp "MAHENGE" was established for award to the participants of the 1917 campaign beginning in Tanganyika in German East Africa and resulting in the capture of the city of Mahenge.

The medal was produced in two different variants, type 1 bore the years 1914–1916, type 2 bore the years 1914–1917 on the reverse.

== Award description ==
The Commemorative Medal of the African Campaigns 1914–1917 was a 31mm in diameter circular silver (for Belgians) or bronze (for Africans) medal surmounted by a 14mm wide by 12mm high royal crown. The medal had raised edges on both the obverse and reverse. The obverse bore the relief head on image of a lion, its front legs on a rocky outcropping, on the left side of the lion, the base of a mountain, on the right, tropical flora. Above the lion's head, just below the medal's edge, a small relief five pointed star. On the reverse at top, a relief five pointed star bisecting the years "1914*1916" in the case of a type 1 medal, or the years "1914*1917" in the case of a type 2 medal. Three relief laurel branches, two horizontal and one vertical are partially hidden by the names of the localities where engagements were fought inscribed on nine lines, in all capital letters:

- Kamerun
- Ouesso Assobam
- Mulundu Jaunde
- Afrique Orientale Allemande
- Kigali
- Nyansa Udjiji
- Usumbura Biaramulo
- Kitega St Michael
- Tabora

The medal was suspended by a ring through a suspension loop from a light blue 38mm wide silk moiré ribbon with 5mm wide yellow edge stripes.

== Notable recipients (partial list) ==
The individuals listed below were awarded the 1914–1917 African Campaigns Commemorative Medal:

- Major General Lucien Van Hoof
- Lieutenant General Charles Baron Tombeur de Tabora
- Colonel Sir Hugué de Mahenge
- Governor of the Congo Pierre Ryckmans
- Lieutenant General Paul Ermens
- Commandant Kristian Løken

== See also ==
- Belgian Congo
- Orders, decorations, and medals of Belgium

== Other sources ==
- Quinot H., 1950, Recueil illustré des décorations belges et congolaises, 4e Edition. (Hasselt)
- Cornet R., 1982, Recueil des dispositions légales et réglementaires régissant les ordres nationaux belges. 2e Ed. N.pl., (Brussels)
- Borné A.C., 1985, Distinctions honorifiques de la Belgique, 1830–1985 (Brussels)
