= Carl Schiøtz =

Norwegian physician and professor

Carl Schiøtz (2 November 1877 – 20 September 1938) was a Norwegian physician and professor of hygiene and bacteriology at the University of Oslo.

== Biography ==
He was born in Hamar, Norway. His parents were Jonas Schanche Kielland Schiøtz (1841–1901) and his wife Hanna Minda Constance Øvergaard. His brother was military officer Johannes Henrik Schiøtz (1884–1957). In 1906, he was married to Borghild Hannestad (1882–1952). After graduating in 1896 from Hamar Cathedral School, he became a cand.med. in 1904 at the University of Kristiana. From 1907 to 1914 he worked in Nes Municipality (in the present-day Ringsaker Municipality). He moved to Kristiania (now Oslo) to work at the Rikshospitalet as a reserve doctor, university fellow, and health inspector. In 1916, he became a doctor at the Freia Chocolate Factory. In 1918 he got his Dr. med. degree with his dissertation on school children's weight ratios.

Schiøtz conducted a number of comprehensive and significant studies on the schoolchildren's health and did much for the development of school hygiene. He is most known for composing what became known as the "Oslo breakfast" (Norwegian: Oslofrokosten), served at all primary schools in Oslo. Oslofrokosten was introduced in school years 1929–1930 at some schools and in 1932 it was introduced at all Oslo schools.

He was a professor of hygiene and bacteriology at the University of Oslo from 1931, a position he had until his death in 1938. He was editor of the Journal of the Norwegian Medical Association from 1929, editor of Sundhetsbladet from 1927 to 1934 and founding editor of the magazine Liv og hälhed from 1934.

From 1935 he was elected to membership in the Norwegian Academy of Science and Letters. He became a knight of the Order of the Dannebrog, Swedish Order of the Polar Star and commander of the Order of the White Rose of Finland.

== Selected works ==
- En undersøkelse av 10 000 norske skolebarn, særlig med hensyn til vekstforhold (1917, thesis)
