= Rita H. Roaldsen =

Norwegian politician (born 1956)

Rita H. Roaldsen (born 4 July 1956 in Ballangen Municipality) is a Norwegian politician for the Centre Party.

She was elected to the Norwegian Parliament from Troms in 1993, but was not re-elected in 1997. Instead she served in the position of deputy representative during the term 1997–2001. Between 1997 and 1999, during the first cabinet Bondevik, she was appointed State Secretary in the Ministry of Social Affairs and Health.

Roaldsen was a member of the municipal council of Gratangen Municipality from 1987 to 1993. She was reelected in 1999 and she served as mayor there from 1999-2003.

Outside politics, she worked as a teacher.
