= Nanna Fleischer =

Norwegian teacher

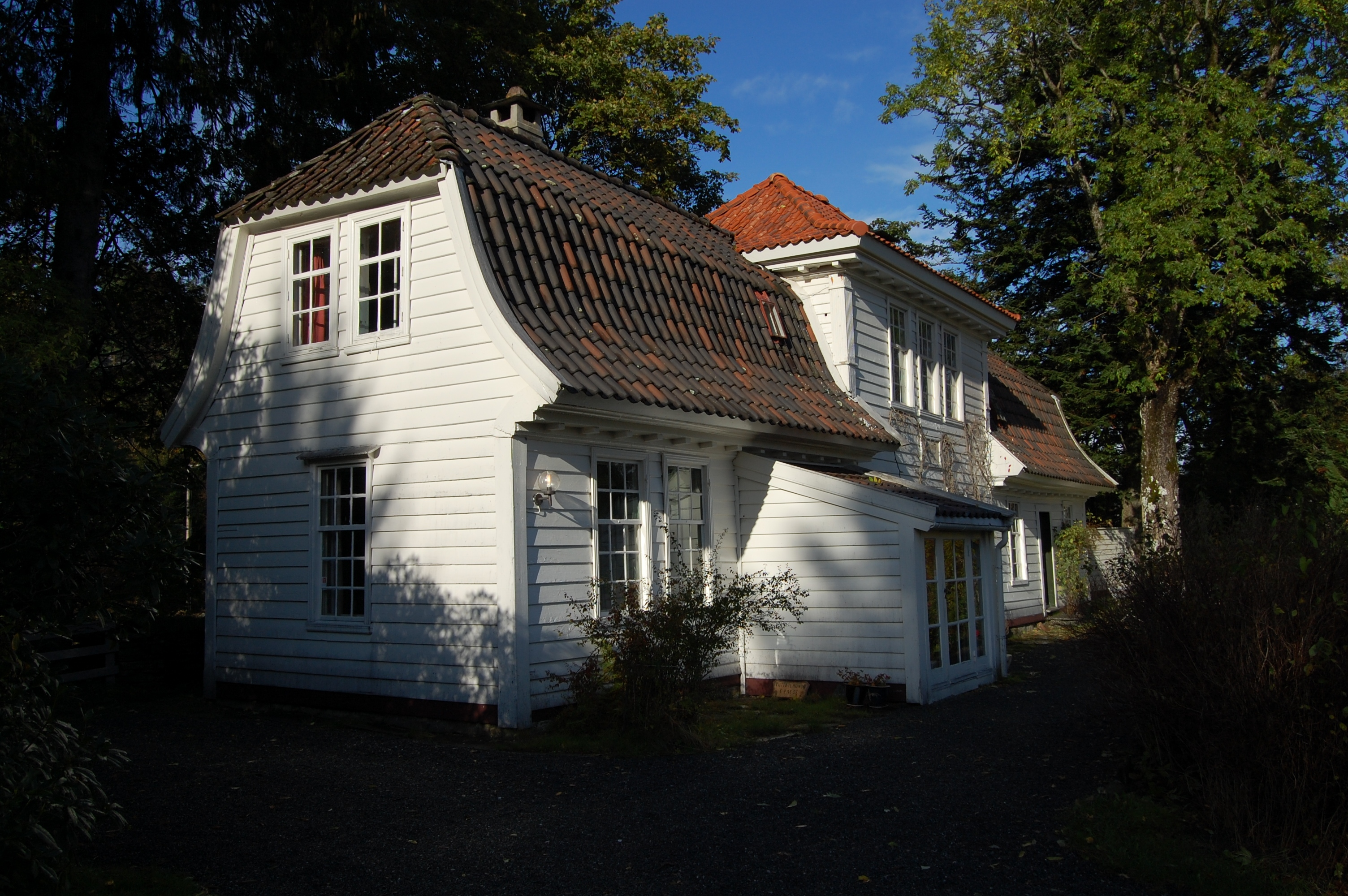
Sophies Minde

Nanna Fleischer (3 February 1862 – 1946) was a Norwegian pioneering teacher for disabled persons. She was the co-founder of the orthopedic institution, Sophies Minde.

She was born in Christiania (now Oslo, Norway). She was the sister of Agnes Fleischer. Together with her sister Agnes, who suffered from a hip and back disease, she established a school for disabled persons in 1892 with a grant from King Oscar II of Sweden , which was the basis for the institution Sophies Minde, established in 1897. After her sister's death in 1909 she continued as the sole manager of Sophies Minde until her retirement in 1921. The orthopedic hospital later became part of the National Centre for orthopedics which in 1995 was merged with the Oslo University Hospital, Rikshospitalet.
