= Arne Dagfin Dahl =

Norwegian Army officer (1894–1990)

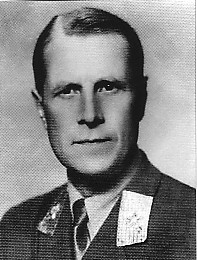
- Born: 24 May 1894; Kristiania, Norway
- Died: 26 October 1990 (aged 96); Oslo, Norway
- Burial place: Vestre gravlund, Oslo
- Spouse: Astri Thinn Christophersen (m. 1921)
- Relatives: Ragnvald Dahl (father); Anna Othilie Stablum (mother); Ørnulf Dahl (brother)
- Military career
- Allegiance: Norway
- Branch: Norwegian Army
- Service years: 1912–1956
- Rank: Generalmajor (Major General)
- Unit: 14th Infantry Regiment (1915-1916)
- Commands: CO Alta Battalion; Chief Military Mission to Soviet Union; GOC Military District North Norway; GOC Norwegian occupation forces in Germany
- Conflicts: Second World War: Battle of Gratangen; Battles of Narvik; Liberation of Finnmark
- Awards: (Norway) St. Olav's Medal With Oak Branch (Norway) Defence Medal with Rosette (Norway) King Haakon's Remembrance medal (France) Croix de Guerre with Star (France) Croix de Guerre with palm (France) Commander of the Legion of Honour (United Kingdom) Commander of the Order of the British Empire (United States) Bronze Star

Arne Dagfin Dahl (24 May 1894 – 26 October 1990) was a Norwegian military officer most renowned as the commander of the Alta Battalion during the fighting at Narvik in Northern Norway in 1940.

== Early and personal life ==
Born in Kristiania on 24 May 1894, Arne Dagfin Dahl was the son of postmaster Ragnvald Dahl and Anna Othilie Stablum. He was brother of fellow army officer Ørnulf Dahl. He took his examen artium in 1912, graduated from business school in 1919 and entered law studies at the Royal Frederick University in 1921. In 1924, he dropped out of university, to become director of the Norwegian Automobile Federation. Dahl had gained an international pilot licence in 1918.

On 17 September 1921, Dahl married Kristiania-born Astri Thinn Christophersen (b. 12 July 1901). By 1930, the couple had three daughters.

== Civilian career ==
In the years 1920-1924, Dahl worked as a physical education teacher at the school St. Hanshaugens gymnasium. From 1920 to 1924 he worked as a secretary at the Oslo Forsvarsforening, and from 1923 to 1929 he edited the automotive magazine Norsk Motorblad.

== Military career ==
=== First World War ===
Dahl graduated from the Norwegian Military Academy in 1915, with the rank of first lieutenant. During the First World War, Dahl first saw service in the Norwegian Army's neutrality guard in 1915-1916, with the 14th Infantry Regiment. He then served as the Norwegian military attaché to the United Kingdom (1916-1919) and Belgium (1917-1919).

In connection with this assignment to Belgium Dahl spent time at the front lines as an observer. According to a 1998 report on the Alta Battalion by the Norwegian Ministry of Health and Care Services, an obituary for Dahl, the source of which is not recorded, states that as a young lieutenant he participated with a division of the British Army in the Battle of the Somme in 1916.

After returning to Norway in 1919, Dahl spent five years working at the Norwegian Military Academy. In 1929 he became an adjutant to Haakon VII of Norway, and in 1930 was promoted to captain.

=== Second World War ===
Dahl assumed command of the Alta Battalion in 1939 and led it through the 1940 Norwegian Campaign. He has since been considered perhaps the best Norwegian battalion commander during the fighting at Narvik.

He later served in the UK and the U.S. as well as having other commands. He headed the Norwegian government-in-exile's wartime military mission in Moscow. In the autumn of 1944, as a full colonel, he became the commander of the Norwegian Military Mission in Finnmark.

In 1941, Dahl became the first Norwegian to attend the Command and General Staff College at Fort Leavenworth, Kansas.

==== Finnmark command ====
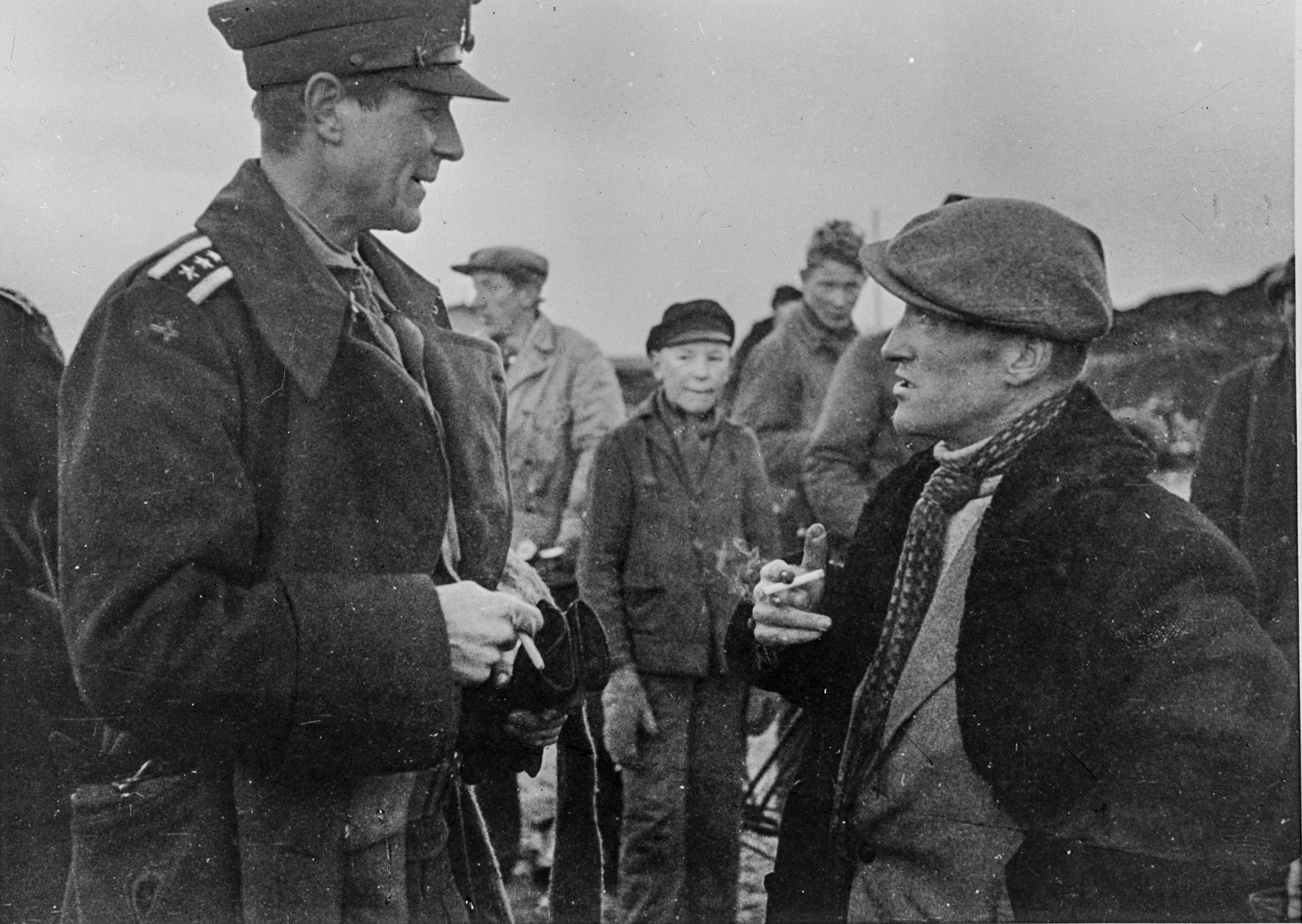
Dahl (left) in conversation with Peder Holt (right), the interim Governor of Finnmark, in Vadsø, in late 1944

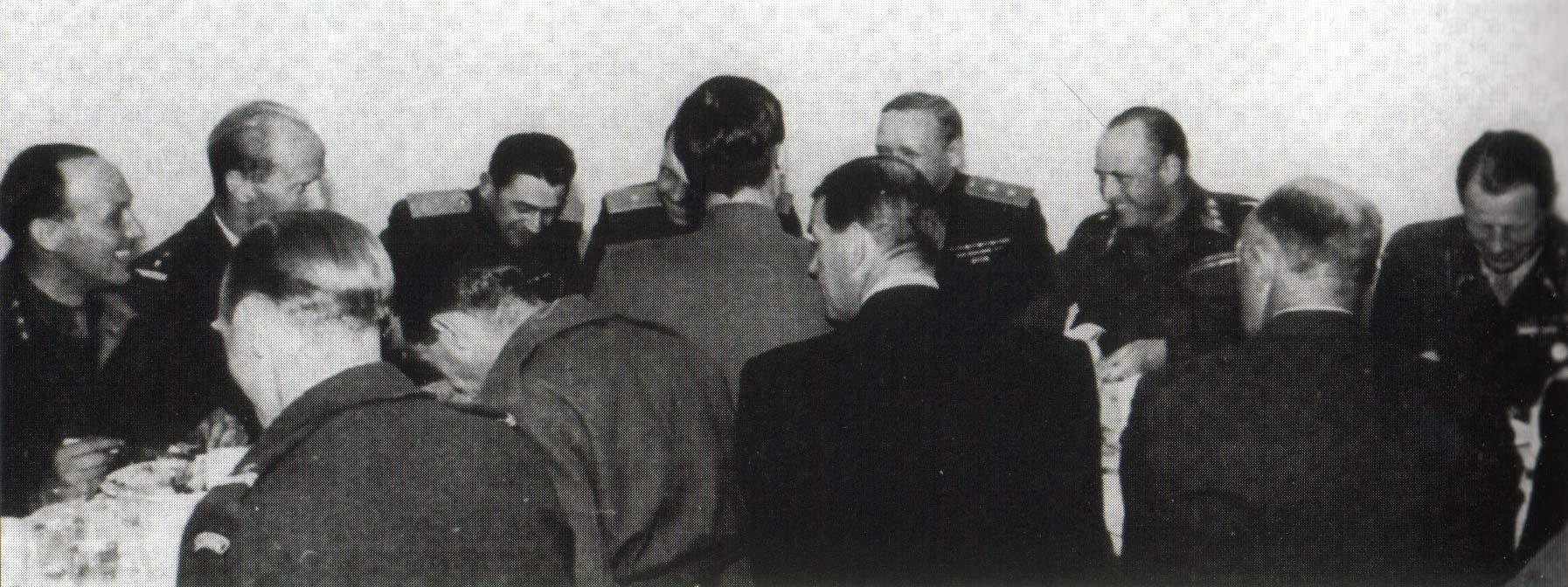
Dinner party in the Norwegian town of Kirkenes in July 1945. At the rear from right: Colonel A. D. Dahl, Crown Prince Olav, and Commander of Soviet Forces in Norway Lieutenant General Shcherbakov.

Dahl was given charge of the Norwegian forces that were transferred to assist in the Liberation of Finnmark from November 1944. Once there, he assumed control of the front from the Soviets, commanding the Free Norwegian Forces that had followed him from Britain, locally raised militias, and recently-arrived police troops from Sweden. At the time of the German capitulation in Norway on 8 May 1945 Dahl had under his Finnmark command around 3,000 soldiers. Although involved in very little fighting, the force under Dahl's command was heavily involved in helping the civilian population of Finnmark and served as a symbol of Norwegian sovereignty in the area. Dahl on his part had concerns that the Soviet forces which had been stationed in Eastern Finnmark since the October 1944 Petsamo-Kirkenes Operation might not leave after the end of the war. These fears proved groundless, as all the Soviet forces had left Norwegian territory by 25 September 1945.

=== Post-war service ===
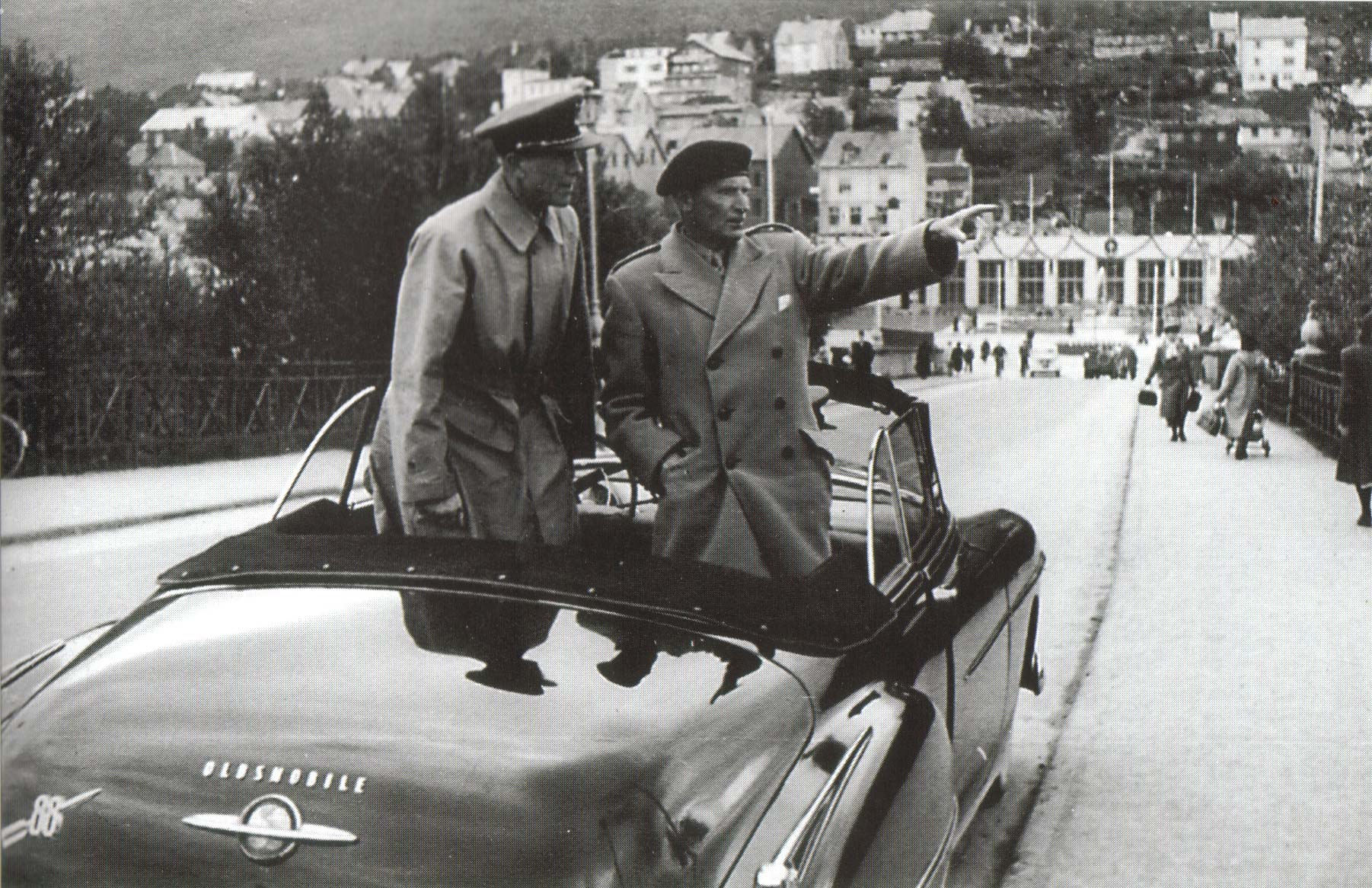
Deputy Supreme Commander Europe of NATO Field Marshal Bernard Law Montgomery and Major General Arne Dagfin Dahl on inspection in Narvik on 5 July 1951.

A.D. Dahl became a Major General and commander of District Command North in 1945.

In the period 1 September 1949 to 31 October 1950, Dahl commanded the Independent Norwegian Brigade Group in Germany.

== Honours and awards ==
By 1930, Dahl was an Officer of the Order of the British Empire and a Knight of the Belgian Order of the Crown.

== Bibliography ==
- Gjems-Onstad, Erik (1996). Krigskorset og St. Olavsmedaljen med ekegren (in Norwegian). Grøndahl Dreyer. ISBN 82-504-2190-6.
- Mjøen, Jarle (1990). Minneskrift over Alta bataljons innsats ved krigsutbruddet 1940: 9. april 1940 - 9. april 1990 (in Norwegian). Alta Battalion.
