= 6th Brigade (Norway) =

- Insignia of the 6th Brigade
- Active: 1933 – 2004
- Country: Norway
- Type: Infantry
- Engagements: World War II: Norwegian campaign

Brigade 6 is an inactive Norwegian Infantry Brigade. Upon mobilization of the Norwegian Army, this Infantry Brigade was under the command of the 6th Division of the Norwegian Army.

The 6th Division was commissioned in 1933 to establish a field brigade with the same number as the division. 6th Brigade is often referred to as 6 fields brigade in literature on World War II.

In 2004, plans called for Brigade 6 to be a mobilisation brigade, using the equipment earmarked for training, maintenance, and repair (the second set of equipment) of Brigade North. Brigade 6 was not to be deployable overseas for international operations, but was planned to be capable of taking part in network-based multinational operations on Norwegian territory.

== Further reading (Norwegian) ==
1. 6. Divisjon DKN 1940–1990, 50 år side 43, 62
2. Hæren etter den annen verdenskrig 1945-1990, Hærstaben 1990, 3. opplag, vedlegg 17 side 542, sider 185-186, 329, 507
3. Fanenemnda av 2002, FO/HST, Forsvarsmuseet, Biblioteket, hylle 929.9 fan
