= Agnes Fleischer =

Norwegian teacher (1865–1909)

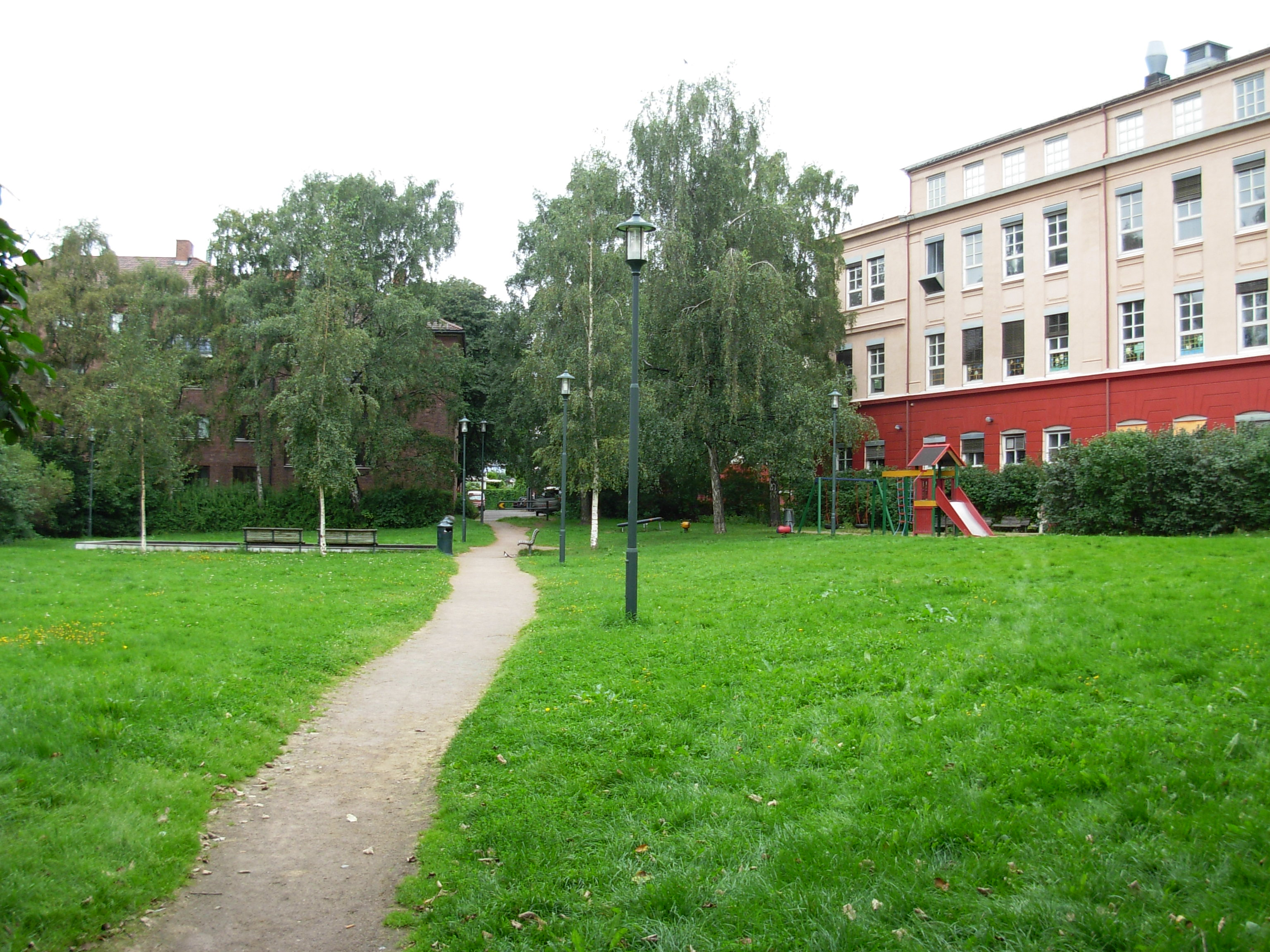
Sophies Minde

Agnes Fleischer (6 February 1865 – 15 September 1909) was a Norwegian pioneering teacher for disabled persons. She was born on 6 February 1865, in Christiania. Her sister was Nanna Fleischer. She suffered herself from a serious hip and back disease, and with help form her sister, and funds from their father, the two sisters established a school for disabled persons in 1892.

The school was the basis for the institution Sophies Minde, established in 1897 from grants from King Oscar II and Queen Sophie.

Agnes and Nanna Fleischer were both awarded King Oscar II's Medal in gold in 1905. Agnes died on 15 September 1909, aged 44.
