= Gratangen (fjord) =

Fjord in Gratangen Municipality in Troms county, Norway

Gratangen (Norwegian) Rivtták (Northern Sami)
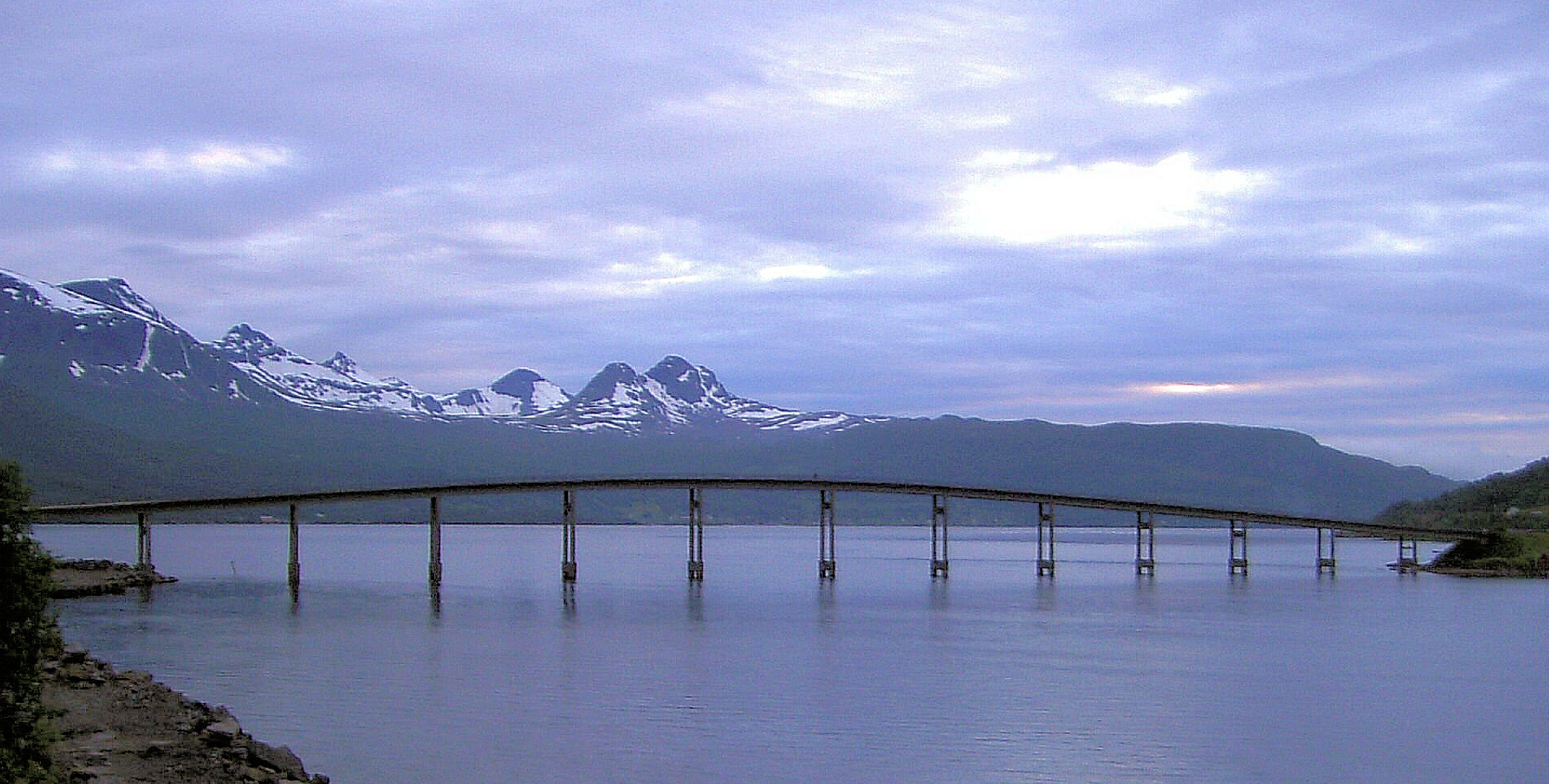
- View of the bridge over the fjord
- Interactive map of the fjord
- Location: Troms county, Norway
- Coordinates: 68.7317°N 17.3697°E
- Type: Fjord
- Basin countries: Norway
- Max. length: 23 kilometres (14 mi)
- Max. width: 1 to 2 kilometres (0.62 to 1.24 mi)
- Settlements: Årstein

Gratangen (Northern Sami) or Rivtták (Northern Sami) is a fjord in Gratangen Municipality in Troms county, Norway. The 23-kilometre (14 mi) long fjord is an arm off of the main Astafjorden. The municipality of Gratangen surrounds the fjord and is named after the fjord. The fjord is about 1 to 2 kilometres (0.62 to 1.24 mi) wide, except for a very narrow 350-metre (1,150 ft) wide point in the middle of the fjord where the village of Årstein is located. At that point, the Årstein Bridge on Norwegian County Road 825 crosses the fjord.

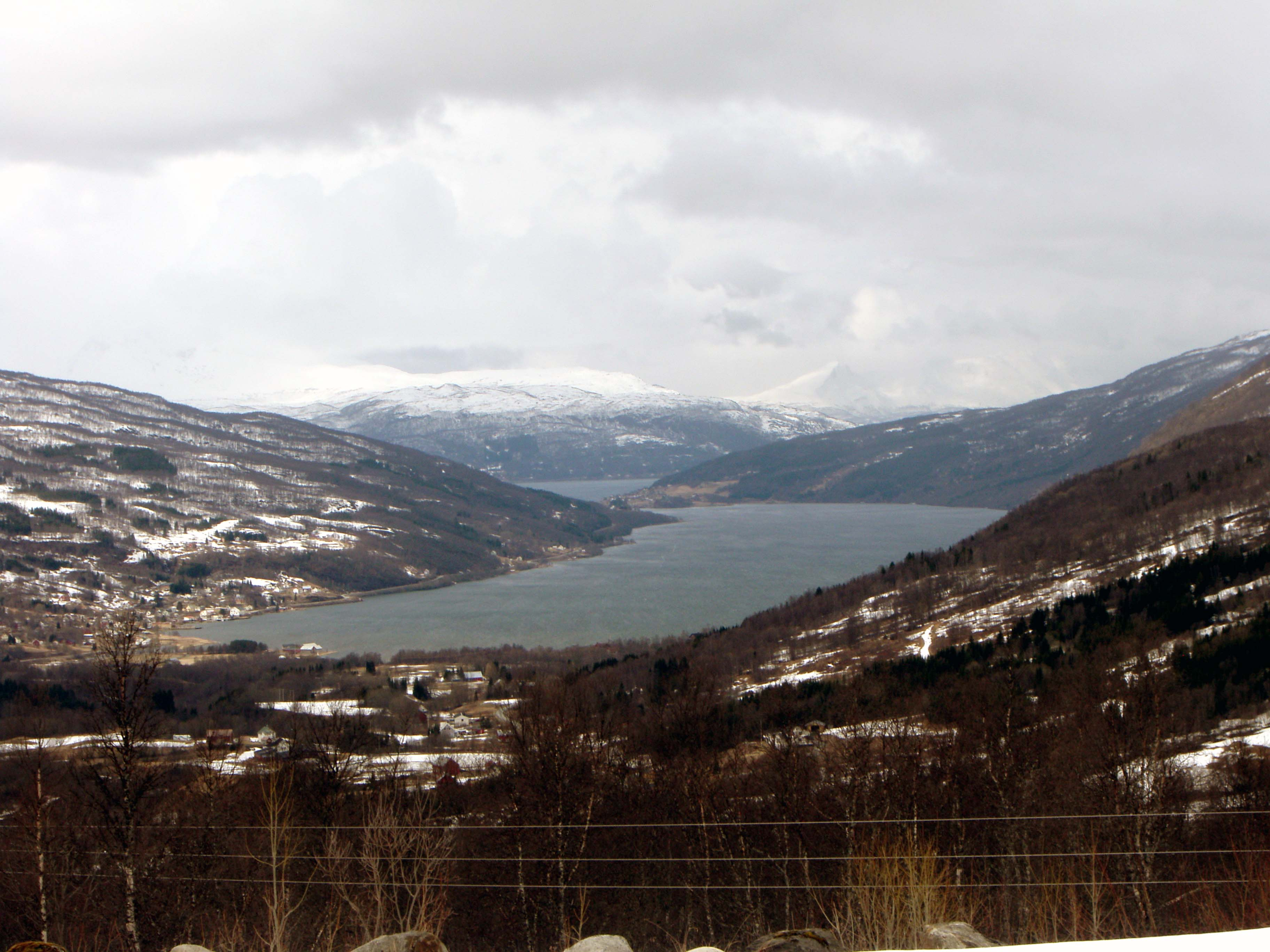
The innermost part of the Gratangen

The villages of Fjordbotn and Elvenes are located at the innermost part of the fjord. Årstein, Åkeneset, and Foldvik are located along the central part of the fjord. Myrlandshaugen and Hilleshamn are located at the mouth of the fjord. The European route E06 highway passes about 2 kilometres (1.2 mi) southeast of Fjordbotn and Elvenes.

== See also ==
- List of Norwegian fjords
