= Arnfinn Haga =

Norwegian writer and teacher

- Born: 10 February 1936 (age 89); Stord Municipality, Norway
- Occupations: Schoolteacher and non-fiction writer
- Awards: King's Medal of Merit in gold (2003)

Arnfinn Haga (born 10 February 1936) is a Norwegian teacher and non-fiction writer, born in Stord Municipality. He made his literary début in 1974 with Det regner i fjellet. His authorship has focused on Norwegian resistance during the occupation of Norway by Nazi Germany from 1940 to 1945. He was awarded the King's Medal of Merit in gold in 2003 for his literary works.

== Selected works ==
- Arquebus kaller London. 1977.
- Da stjernene frøs. 1981.
- Jernring rundt Bjørn West. 1982.
- Vi fløy Catalina. 1983.
- Da Stein-organisasjonen ble sprengt. 1987.
- Mørket var min venn. 1991.
- Alta bataljon 1940. 1998.
- Valdres 1940. 1999.
- Raidet mot Stordø Kisgruber. 2003.
- Rapport fra utpostene. 2008.
