= Carl August Fleischer =

Norwegian jurist

Carl August Fleischer (born 26 August 1936) is a Norwegian jurist, born in Oslo. He was professor of jurisprudence at the University of Oslo from 1970. He has been a long-term consultant for the Ministry of Foreign Affairs, and has also participated in a number of public committees.
