= Norsk Militært Tidsskrift =

- Discipline: Military science
- Language: Norwegian
- Edited by: Harald Høiback

Publication details
- Former names: Militairt Tidsskrift; Norskt Militairt Tidsskrift
- History: 1831–present
- Publisher: Oslo Militære Samfund (Norway)

Standard abbreviations
- ISO 4: Nor. Mil. Tidsskr.

Indexing
- ISSN: 0029-2028
- LCCN: ca06000315
- OCLC no.: 10419737

Links
- Journal homepage

Norsk Militært Tidsskrift (English: Norwegian Military Journal) is a Norwegian journal first issued in 1831, and published by Oslo Militære Samfund from 1835. The original title of the periodical was Militairt Tidsskrift. It has been issued continuously since 1831, and is among the oldest journals published in Norway.
