= 6th Division (Norway) =

- Insignia of 6th Division from 1991 until disbandment
- Active: 1897–2002; 2002–1 August 2009
- Disbanded: 1 August 2009
- Country: Norway
- Branch: Norwegian Army
- Garrison/HQ: Heggelia, Norway
- Battle honours: World War II: Battle of Gratangen; Battle of Narvik

Commanders
- Last Commander: Major general Kjell Grandhagen
- Notable commanders: General Carl Gustav Fleischer

The 6th Division (Norwegian: 6. divisjon) is a former Norwegian military formation.

== History ==
The pinnacle of this division's service was during World War II, during the German invasion of Norway. It was commanded by General Carl Gustav Fleischer, who was one of the King of Norway's favourite military officers. His division was one of the few Norwegian military commands that was battle ready on 9 April 1940 when the Germans invaded. With help from British, French, and Polish forces, 6th Division were able to recapture the city of Narvik, during what became known as the Battle of Narvik.

The Germans took Narvik at the beginning of the battle, but it was retaken 28 May in what became known as the first major victory for the Allies in World War II. However, the successful German attack on France forced the Allied task force to evacuate, which they did in June. As a result of the withdrawal of allied air and naval support the Norwegians were forced to lay down their arms and demobilize.

In one of the most controversial episodes in history of Norway's role in World War II General Fleischer ended his life in 1942, after being sent to Canada as the Norwegian military attaché, a role that was basically a demotion.

After the demobilisation, 6th Division was disbanded. However, when Norway was liberated in 1945, the division was immediately re-established. One long-term consequence of the action at Narvik was the close cooperation between the British military and Norwegian Army, along with close cooperation with France's alpine forces.

During the Cold War the division fought in no conflicts. But by the 1980s the division comprised the North Hammerfest and South Hammerfest land force areas, controlling the 15th and 14th mobilization brigades respectively; Brigade Nord in Tromso, 5,000 strong, with three infantry battalion, an armoured company, and an artillery battalion with four self-propelled artillery batteries; and the two northern garrisons in Finnmark: the Garrison of Porsanger and the Garrison of Sør-Varanger.

After the end of the Cold War the 6th was re-organized in 2002, as part of an overall reform of the Norwegian Armed Forces.

== Final organisation ==
In its peacetime organisation, 6th Division consisted of approximately 1,200 commissioned and non-commissioned officers (COs and NCOs), with approximately 3,000 enlisted soldiers and 200 civilian support staff. In wartime, its numbers could exceed 12,000 in total.

Being the only division in the Norwegian Army, the 6th utilised a wide range of modern combat equipment. Its heaviest weapons included Leopard 2A4NO MBTs, CV9030 IFVs and modernized M109A3GN howitzers. The infantry use Bv206 tracked all-terrain vehicles, snowmobiles and light off-road vehicles. Their airlifting capabilities were provided by the Tactical Helicopter Group of the Royal Norwegian Air Force, which is stationed at Bardufoss. The division's motto is "Styrke for fred, evne til strid", or "Strength for peace, capability for war".

== Subsidiary units ==
- Brigade Nord - Mechanised infantry brigade including armoured and artillery battalions.
- 6th Brigade - Light infantry reserve brigade.
- Army Ranger Command.
- Border Guard Battalion.
- Intelligence & EW Battalion.
- Home Guard - Although technically a separate branch from the Army, all Home Guard districts are under the 6th Division mobile Command.

The 6th division also included a number of support functions such as engineering and NBC units. The 6th Division was disbanded on 1 August 2009.

== Insignia ==
The 6th Division has utilized different insignia throughout its history.

First insignia used between 1955 and 1957

Second insignia used sometime before 1979 until 1983

Third insignia used between 1983 and 1991

Forth and last insignia used between 1991 and 2009

== Bibliography ==
- Henrik O. Lunde (2010). Hitler's Pre-Emptive War: The Battle for Norway, 1940. Casemate Publishers. ISBN 978-1-935149-33-0.
- Chris Mann; Christer Jörgensen (2003). Hitler's Arctic War: the German campaigns in Norway, Finland, and the USSR, 1940-1945. MacMillan. ISBN 0-312-31100-1.
- Thomas, Nigel; Volstad, Ron (1987). NATO Armies Today. Elite 16. Oxford: Osprey Publishing. ISBN 0-85045-822-6.
