= Ministry of Provisioning and Reconstruction =

Former government ministry of Norway

The Royal Norwegian Ministry of Provisioning and Reconstruction (Norwegian: Forsynings- og gjenreisningsdepartementet) was a Norwegian ministry that existed from 1939 to 1950.

It was established on 1 October 1939 as the Ministry of Provisioning, though it had no relation to the Ministry of Provisioning which existed from 1916 to 1922. The name was changed to the Ministry of Provisioning and Reconstruction in 1942. It ceased to exist on 30 June 1950. Its tasks were transferred to various ministries.

From the beginning in 1939 the ministry consisted of four directorates and one department (alminnelig avdeling). The directorates were led by Nikolai Schei, Jens Bache-Wiig, Per Prebensen and Øivind Lorentzen. The department was led by Alf Frydenberg with Erling Mossige and Andreas Schei as heads of office.

== Ministers ==
No.	Portrait	Minister	Took office	Left office	Time in office	Party	Cabinet
1	Trygve Lie	Trygve Lie (1896–1968)	1 October 1939	19 November 1940	1 year, 49 days	Labour	Nygaardsvold
2	Arne T. Sunde	Arne T. Sunde (1883–1972)	19 November 1940	21 October 1942	1 year, 336 days	Liberal	Nygaardsvold
3	Anders Frihagen	Anders Frihagen (1892–1979)	21 October 1942	25 June 1945	2 years, 247 days	Labour	Nygaardsvold
4	Egil Offenberg	Egil Offenberg (1899–1975)	25 June 1945	5 November 1945	133 days	Conservative	Gerhardsen I
5	Oscar Torp	Oscar Torp (1893–1958)	5 November 1945	10 January 1948	2 years, 66 days	Labour	Gerhardsen II
6	Nils Hønsvald	Nils Hønsvald (1899–1971)	10 January 1948	14 September 1950	2 years, 247 days	Labour	Gerhardsen II

Also, Jens Bache-Wiig was acting minister in 1940, on behalf of the Administrative Council in Oslo. Nikolai Schei and Sverre Støstad were acting ministers in 1945.
