= Lom prisoner of war camp =

Norwegian prison operated briefly in 1940

- Lom krigsfangeleir
- Lom in Innlandet

Site information
- Type: Prisoner-of-war camp
- Controlled by: Norway

Site history
- Built: 17–20 April 1940
- Built by: Norwegian 2nd Division
- In use: 20–27 April 1940
- Materials: Loar School, barbed wire, timber, trenches
- Events: Norwegian Campaign

Garrison information
- Past commanders: Lieutenant Colonel Lars Dannevig
- Garrison: 6 officers, 100 soldiers and 4 female personnel

Lom prisoner of war camp (Norwegian: Lom krigsfangeleir) was a facility used by the Norwegian 2nd Division to hold German prisoners-of-war during the 1940 Norwegian Campaign of the Second World War. The camp, which operated from 20 to 27 April 1940, also held Norwegians accused of collaborating with the Germans or the Norwegians fascists led by Vidkun Quisling.

In the morning of 27 April 1940, the camp was evacuated due to German forces advancing in the area, and the prisoners were marched westwards across the mountains to Sogn. By the time the prisoners and guards reached Sogn after an exhausting march, the resistance in South Norway was collapsing. The prisoners were soon abandoned and left to themselves by the Norwegian guards.

== Establishment ==
Nazi Germany invaded the neutral country of Norway on 9 April 1940. Fighting ensued across large areas of the country, and German military personnel started falling into Norwegian hands. This led to a need for facilities behind the front lines to contain the prisoners. In Eastern Norway the prisoners taken by the Norwegian 2nd Division were initially placed in the auxiliary prison in Sel Municipality in Oppland. Due to capacity issues this initial solution to the prisoner situation soon proved inadequate.

The task of establishing a more permanent facility for German prisoners-of-war in Eastern Norway was given to the 66-year-old Lieutenant Colonel Lars Dannevig. Dannevig had been in the Norwegian capital of Oslo when the Germans invaded on 9 April 1940, and had made his way out of the city to take part in the fighting to delay the German advance until Allied help arrived. The lieutenant colonel had made his way to still neutral Sweden and then northwards by car and train until recrossing the border at Nybergsund on 13 April. After organizing the defences in the Trysil area, and initially being given the task of leading Danish and Swedish volunteer troops in action, Dannevig was ordered by Colonel Hans Sommerfeldt Hiorth to set up a prisoner-of-war camp for up to 200 German captives. He was at the same time made commandant of the Otta Valley. After Dannevig's first choice, the agricultural school in Vågå Municipality, became unavailable because the Norwegian Army High Command wanted to use it as a hospital, Loar School in the village of Fossbergom in Lom Municipality was chosen.

== Operation ==
Using local volunteers and conscripts, Lieutenant Colonel Dannevig had the school fitted out as a prison camp and trenches dug in the vicinity. Barbed wire fences surrounded the school and fighting positions and shrapnel shelters were built from timber at the site of the camp. Dannevig also organized local militia units in the surrounding areas. Lom prisoner of war camp sorted under the Norwegian 2nd Division, led by General Jacob Hvinden Haug. The first German prisoners arrived at the camp on 20 April 1940. A few arrested members of the Norwegian fascist party Nasjonal Samling (NS) came in together with the Germans. The prisoners were housed in the school's gym. Food was cooked and the camp population fed in the main school building. On 21 April Dannevig and the local police officer in Lom interrogated the imprisoned Nasjonal Samling members. After it had been determined that the NS men posed no security risk, they were released and allowed to join the local militia unit.

As Luftwaffe air attack posed a constant risk drills were held in manning the trenches at the camp and in shooting at aircraft. On 22 April a minor air attack occurred, with the Norwegians firing at the bombers in an effort to force them to attack from higher altitudes. The next day, 23 April, a much heavier attack on Lom occurred. Several houses in the area were hit and one soldier and three civilians wounded. One bomb hit the prisoner-of-war camp, but failed to explode. Among the buildings damaged in the raid was the post office and a local business building. The target of the bombing raid was believed by the Norwegians to have been a nearby bridge.

The second and last consignment of prisoners arrived at Lom on 25 April 1940. With the latest additions to the camp population it consisted of six officers, 100 soldiers, four female personnel, 35 German prisoners-of-war and five Norwegian prisoners. The German prisoners at Lom included infantrymen, artillerymen, Luftwaffe personnel and Fallschirmjäger soldiers. One of the first Germans to have been captured during the Norwegian Campaign had been taken prisoner at Bøn, south of Eidsvoll on 11 April. In a short skirmish between Norwegian troops and a German patrol, two Gebirgsjäger had been killed and the Leutnant in command of the patrol captured. After initial confusion over what to do with the officer, he had been first placed in Sel Auxiliary Prison and later transferred to Lom. Most of the prisoners had been captured in fighting east of Lake Mjøsa, including at Strandlykkja.

During the 14–17 April battle of Strandlykkja a German bus had accidentally driven into the forward Norwegian positions on 16 April and had been shot up by Colt M/29 heavy machine guns. Nine German artillerymen were captured. When the Norwegian forces retreated from the Morskogen/Strandlykkja region east of Mjøsa they brought with them 21 prisoners of war, all of whom were sent to the camp at Lom via the Riding House complex at Hamar and Sel Auxiliary Prison. (Note: The group of 21 prisoners who had been held in Hamar before transfer to Lom consisted of four officers, six non-commissioned officers and 11 privates.) The Fallschirmjäger prisoners held at Lom had been captured after having been shot down by Norwegian ground fire en route to attacking the rail road junction of Dombås on 14 April 1940. Included amongst the prisoners were three officers; one Hauptmann and two Leutnants. Two other German prisoners held at Lom were the pilot Unteroffizier Helmut Mütschele and his navigator, Karl Lorey. The Messerschmitt Bf 110 flown by Mütschele had been shot down by the Gloster Gladiator fighter aircraft flown by Norwegian Army Air Service Sergeant Kristian Fredrik Schye during air battles near Oslo on 9 April 1940.

Among the Norwegian prisoners held at Lom was the commander of the Norwegian Army Air Service's air school at Kjeller, Rittmester Harald Normann. Normann was held after having been arrested on 16 April 1940 on suspicion of collaborating with the fascist coup led by Vidkun Quisling. The suspicion was founded in that he as the only Norwegian commander had brought his air unit away from its regular base and to a safer secondary base shortly before the German invasion. Normann's decision on 15 April to evacuate the aircraft under his command to neutral Sweden furthered the suspicions against him and led to his arrest. He was imprisoned for a total of 10 days on the orders of the Norwegian Army High Command, before he was released. After his release Normann assumed command of an infantry unit fighting the Germans in Sør-Trøndelag, before making his way through Sweden to Northern Norway and taking command of Banak Air Station in Finnmark. Both the Military Investigative Commission of 1946 and later investigations in 1975 cleared Normann of the charges relating to his actions in April 1940.

Before arriving at Lom, Normann and several other Norwegian and German prisoners had been held and interrogated at Sel Auxiliary Prison. The prison was under the command of Major Peter Krohn, while the main interrogators were the chief of the Norwegian military police Eivind Rognlien and his second in command, police chief Jonas Lie. Rognlien and Lie both interrogated Rittmester Normann, Lie coming to the conclusion that Normann was innocent, but being overruled by Rognlien. (Note: Jonas Lie, who was considered pro-German, had been declared by Vidkun Quisling as minister of justice in the latter's short-lived coup government on 9 April 1940. Lie had dismissed the declaration, and vowed to fight the German invaders. Jonas Lie had a change of heart in September 1940, joining Quisling's party Nasjonal Samling and becoming minister of police in Quisling's council.)

== Dissolution ==
On 26 April 1940 Lieutenant Colonel Dannevig was informed that the Germans were about to capture the town of Otta, cutting off the Otta Valley. The commander of the 2nd Division, General Jacob Hvinden Haug, authorized Dannevig to do as he saw best with the forces at his command. Dannevig decided to evacuate the camp and march his troops and prisoners over the mountains to join the Norwegian 4th Division in Sogn. All the prisoners were taken along, while about half of the Norwegian soldiers were dismissed because of insufficient skiing skills. The march westwards began at 1000hrs on 27 April, the German prisoners dragging ski sleds across the snow-clad mountains. The first night was spent at Krosbu. Many prisoners soon suffered from snow blindness and exhaustion, some having to be left behind at the hotel Turtagrø, where the column spent the second night, to be retrieved later by snow sleds. Over several days the prisoners were brought by boat to Vadheim in Sogn. By the time the prisoners reached Vadheim resistance in the southern parts of Norway was ending and the Germans were left to themselves. Dannevig's militia unit was disbanded on 1 May 1940.

The commander of Lom prisoner of war camp, Lars Dannevig, joined the Norwegian resistance movement after the end of the Norwegian Campaign. After a failed attempt at escaping across the North Sea to the United Kingdom, Dannevig was arrested by the Gestapo in 1942 and killed during interrogation in Trondheim.

== Bibliography ==
- Arneberg, Sven T. (1989). Vi dro mot nord : felttoget i Norge i april 1940, skildret av tyske soldater og offiserer: (Oslo, Østfold, Akershus, Hedmark, Oppland, Møre og Romsdal) (in Norwegian). Aventura.
- Hauge, Andreas (1995). Kampene i Norge 1940 (in Norwegian). Vol. 1. Sandefjord: Krigshistorisk Forlag. ISBN 82-993369-0-2.
- Midtdal, John (1995). Tufsingdalen i krigens dager 1940–1945 (in Norwegian). J. Midtdal.
- Mølmen, Øystein (1996). Krigen 1940–45 (in Norwegian). Lesjaskog: Ø. Mølmen. ISBN 82-993958-0-1.
- Munthe-Kaas, Otto (1955). Krigen i Norge 1940: Operasjonene gjennom Romerike, Hedemarken, Gudbrandsdalen, Romsdalen (in Norwegian). Vol. 1. Oslo: Gyldendal.
- Rødder, Sverre (1990). Min ære er troskap – om politiminister Jonas Lie (in Norwegian). Oslo: Aschehoug. ISBN 82-03-16282-7.
- Thomas, Andrew (2002). Gloster Gladiator Aces. Oxford: Osprey Publishing. ISBN 1-84176-289-X.
