= Bache-Wiig =

Bache-Wiig is a double-barrelled Norwegian surname, derived from Bache and Wiig. Notable people with the surname include:

- Anna Bache-Wiig (born 1975), Norwegian actress and screenwriter
- Jens Bache-Wiig (1880–1965), Norwegian engineer
- Sara Bache-Wiig (1894–1971), Norwegian-born American mycologist and botany professor
