= Anders Frihagen =

Norwegian politician (1892–1979)

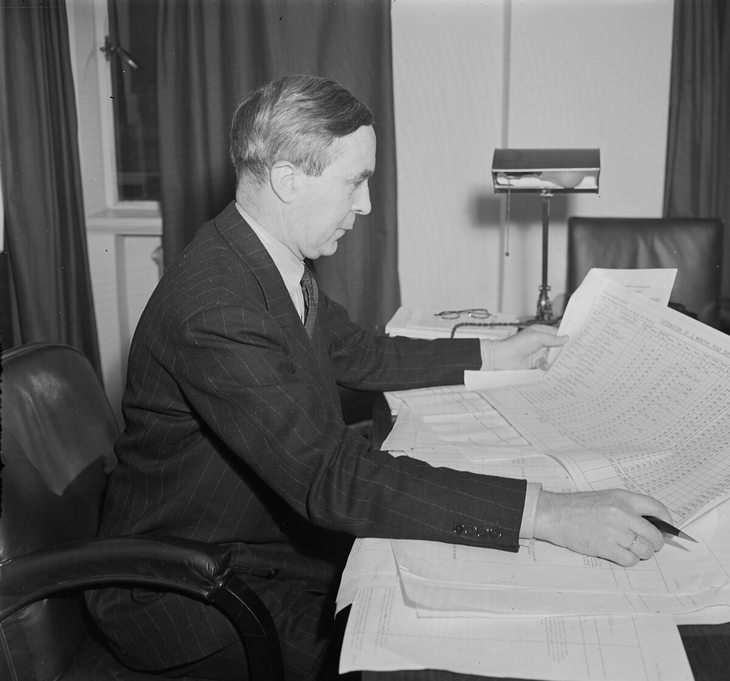
- Frihagen in 1940.

Minister of Provisioning and Reconstruction
- In office 21 October 1942 – 25 June 1945
- Prime Minister: Johan Nygaardsvold
- Preceded by: Arne T. Sunde
- Succeeded by: Egil Offenberg

Minister of Trade
- In office 15 April 1942 – 1 October 1942
- Prime Minister: Johan Nygaardsvold
- Preceded by: Terje Wold
- Succeeded by: Olav Hindahl
- In office 2 October 1939 – 7 June 1940
- Prime Minister: Johan Nygaardsvold
- Preceded by: Trygve Lie
- Succeeded by: Terje Wold

Personal details
- Born: Anders Rasmus Frihagen; 28 January 1892 Åheim, Møre og Romsdal, United Kingdoms of Sweden and Norway
- Died: 5 April 1979 (aged 87) Oslo, Norway
- Party: Labour
- Spouse: Gro Standrud (m. 1925)
- Domestic partner: Gro Strandrud (1897–1969),
- Children: Arvid Frihagen
- Parent(s): Small farmer and fisherman Mathias Andreas Iversen Frihagen (1851–91) and Martha Rasmine Arnesdatter Aahjem (1860–1912).

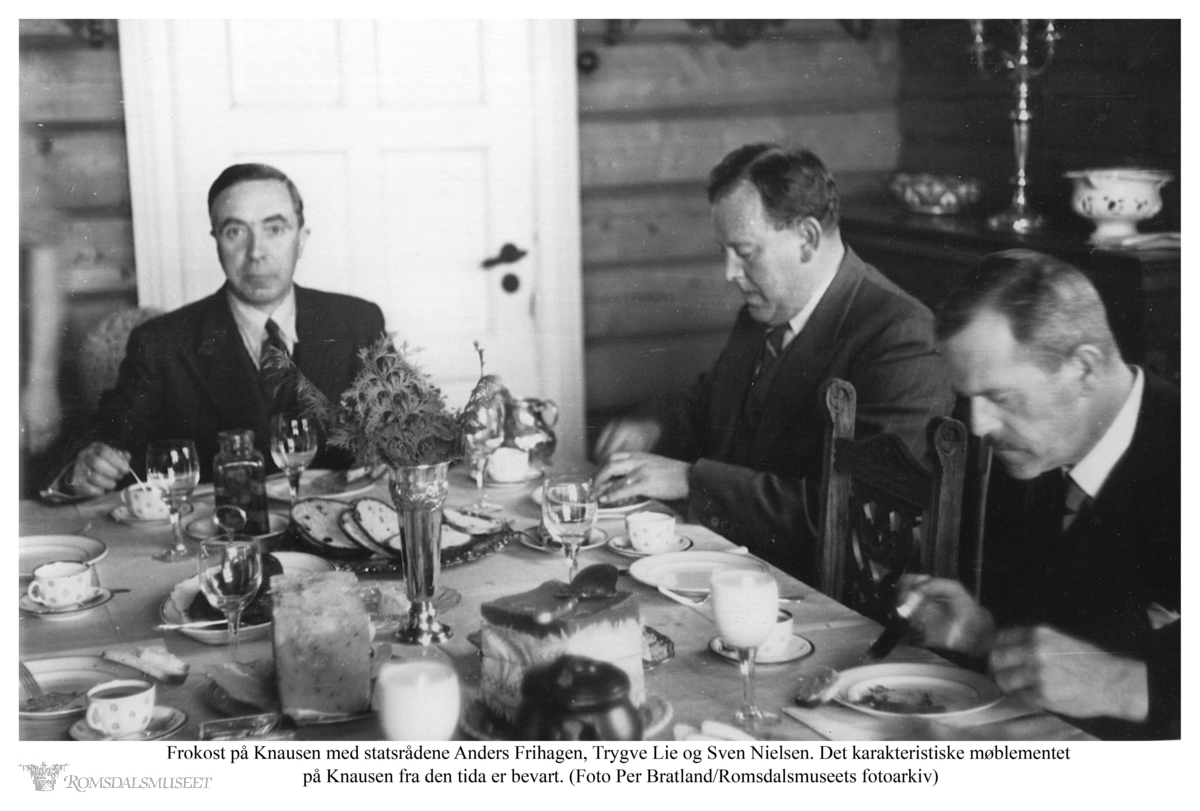

Andreas Frihagen (born 28 January 1892 in Vanylven, Møre og Romsdal – died on 5 April 1979 in Oslo) was a prominent Norwegian bank manager and politician affiliated with the Norwegian Labour Party. He served as the manager of "Den norske Industribank" before transitioning to a governmental role. Initially, he held the position of head of the Ministry of Trade. Later, in 1942, he became the head of the Ministry of Supply and Reconstruction as part of Norway's post-war reconstruction efforts.

During World War II, Frihagen and the rest of the Norwegian government were forced to flee north to evade the German invasion. Utilizing his banking expertise, he facilitated the transport of Norges Bank's cash holdings and managed the government's "travel fund." Eventually, it was decided that Frihagen would represent the exiled Norwegian government in Sweden before re joining the government in London at a later time.

In the post-war period, Frihagen resumed his position as the director of Den norske Industribank, serving until 1957. Between 1951 and 1962, he also held the role of director in the Banking Inspectorate. He played various roles in the Norwegian financial system, contributing to public committees like The Money and Banking Law Committee of 1950. While he briefly served on the town council in Aker from 1946 to 1947, his active involvement in party politics ceased afterward.

Internationally, Frihagen engaged in significant affairs. He served as the President of the UN Economic Commission for Europe in Geneva from 1948 to 1950. Additionally, he advised the UN on establishing a banking system in Cyprus from 1963 to 1965. Frihagen documented his experiences and observations during the war in a book titled "Two Reports," published in 1972.
