= Arne Sunde =

Norwegian politician (1883–1972)

Arne Toralf Sunde
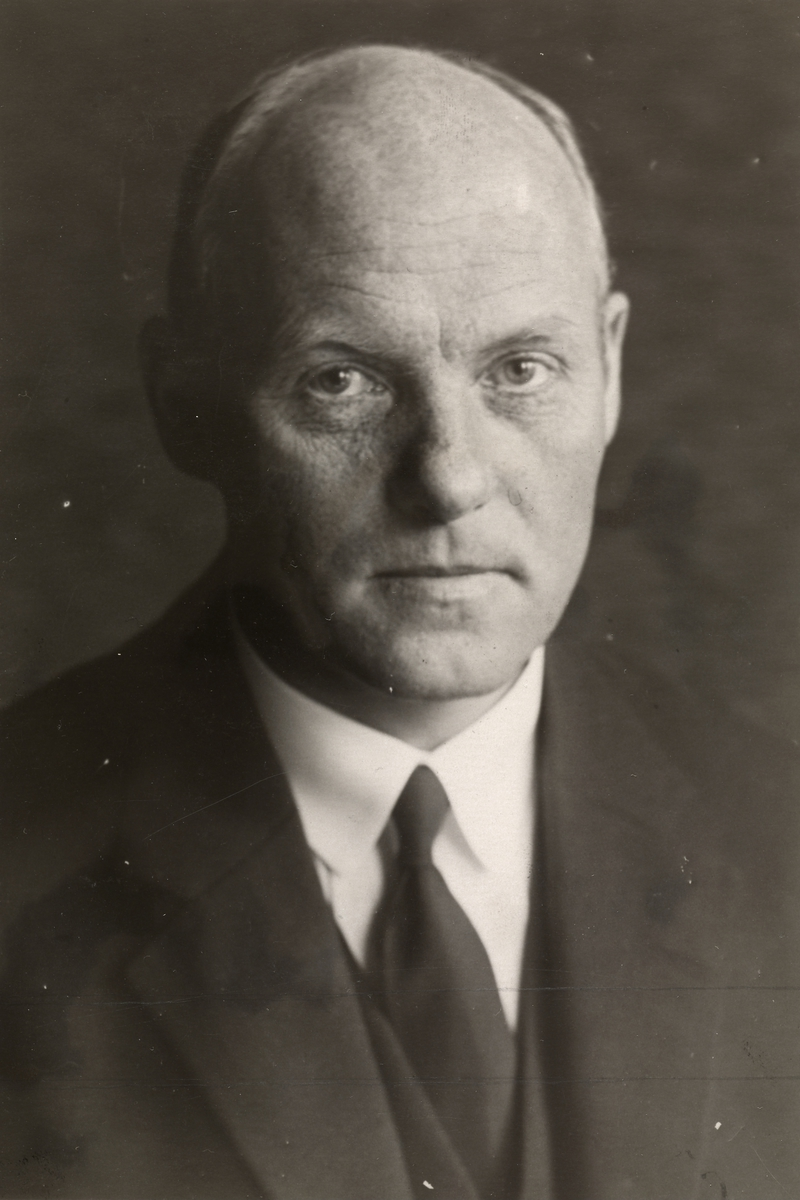

Minister of Justice
- In office 3 March 1933 – 20 March 1935
- Prime Minister: J. L. Mowinckel
- Preceded by: Asbjørn Lindboe
- Succeeded by: Trygve Lie
- In office 21 November 1930 – 12 May 1931
- Prime Minister: J. L. Mowinckel
- Preceded by: Haakon M. Evjenth
- Succeeded by: Asbjørn Lindboe

Supreme Court Justice
- In office 1935–1936

Consultative Councillor of State
- In office 7 June 1940 – 9 November 1940

Minister of Provisioning and Reconstruction
- In office 19 November 1940 – 21 October 1942
- Prime Minister: Johan Nygaardsvold
- Preceded by: Trygve Lie
- Succeeded by: Anders Frihagen

Minister of Shipping
- In office 21 October 1942 – 25 June 1945
- Prime Minister: Johan Nygaardsvold
- Preceded by: Position established
- Succeeded by: Erik Brofoss (1947)

Ambassador to the United Nations
- In office 1949–1952

President of the United Nations Security Council
- In office 1 July 1950 – 31 July 1950
- Preceded by: Benegal Narsing Rau
- Succeeded by: Yakov Malik
- In office 1 June 1949 – 30 June 1949
- Preceded by: Jean Chauvel
- Succeeded by: Dmitry Manuilsky

Personal details
- Born: 6 December 1883 Kristiania, United Kingdoms of Sweden and Norway
- Died: 30 July 1972 (aged 88) Oslo, Norway
- Party: Liberal
- Spouse: Titti Sunde (m. 1916)
- Relations: Elias Sunde (father); Major Bjørn Sunde (brother)
- Profession: Army officer Olympic shooter Bank chief Nortraship leader

Arne Toralf Sunde (6 December 1883 – 30 July 1972) was a Norwegian politician, Olympic shooter and army officer. He is best known for his participation in the 1940 Norwegian Campaign, his participation in Nygaardsvold's Cabinet during its 1940–1945 exile in London and three years as a United Nations ambassador. Sunde was President of the United Nations Security Council in June 1949 and July 1950.

== Before the Second World War ==
=== Personal life ===
Arne Sunde was born on 6 December 1883 in the Norwegian capital Kristiania. His parents were Director General of the Norwegian State Railways, Member of Parliament and Minister of Finance Elias Sunde and his wife Benedicte Louise Tjersland. On 26 July 1916, Arne Sunde married Sigrid Nicoline Aubert Lie (called "Didi", or "Titti"). His wife was a daughter of writer Bernt Lie. Thus, Arne Sunde was a brother-in-law of Emil Lie. Sunde's wife was also a second cousin of Jonas Lie, a Nazi police chief who joined the pretending government after Sunde and many others fled Norway during the Second World War. On the other hand, Sunde's wife's aunt was the mother of resistance member Tikken Manus. The couple had three sons by 1930. Sunde died in Oslo on 30 July 1972, aged 88.

=== Sports ===
Sunde was an avid sports shooter in the Oslo-based rifle association Christiania Skytterlag. He participated in the Norwegian team in the 1912 Summer Olympics in Stockholm, Sweden. Sunde competed in the following events in 1912:

1912 Summer Olympics
Event	Rank
Men's Free Rifle, Three Positions, 300 metres	30
Men's Military Rifle, Three Positions, 300 metres	44
Men's Military Rifle, Any Position, 600 metres	30
Men's Military Rifle, 200, 400, 500 and 600 metres, Team	6
Men's Small-Bore Rifle, Any Position, 50 metres	30

=== Education and early career ===
Sunde was educated in law and military studies, first graduating from Kristiania Cathedral School in 1902. Having been working as an officer since graduating from the Norwegian Military Academy in 1905, first at the Bergenske Brigade and then at the 2nd Akerhuske Brigade, Sunde graduated from the Norwegian Military College in 1907. From 1907 to 1909, Sunde taught at the NCO school in Bergen, holding the rank of premierløytnant. He then served with the 5th Østoplandenes Infantry Regiment until 1918. In 1911, he took the cand.jur. degree after attending law school. From 1911 to 1912, he worked as a barrister and judge. In 1913, Sunde studied political science at the École Libre des Sciences Politiques in Paris. He then served as a district stipendiary magistrate (Norwegian: sorenskriver) for Eiker, Modum and Sigdal District Court in Buskerud from 1913 to 1914. In 1916, Sunde was appointed adjunct military attaché to the Norwegian legation in Paris, and in 1919 he was an assistant in financial questions for the Norwegian legation during the negotiations leading up to the Treaty of Versailles. From 1918, he served as an infantry captain in the Norwegian Army 2nd Division. Between 1917 and 1920, Sunde worked for Det Norske A/S for Elektrokemisk Industri, as a legal advisor and sousdirektør. In the same time period he was the secretary of the Norwegian State Financial Council (Norwegian: Statens finansråd), and from 1922 he served as a barrister at the Supreme Court. From 1920 to 1921, he was secretary during the Norwegian treaty negotiations with the so-called "wine countries" (France, Spain and Portugal) with regards to the Norwegian prohibition. In 1924, he was a board member of the bank Den Norske Handelsbank and a member of the administrative board of the Bank of Norway. From 1918 to 1930, he commanded Company 7 of the 5th Østoplandenes Infantry Regiment, before being made supernumerary.

=== Political career ===
One of Arne Sunde's earliest encounters with national politics came in 1926. At the appointment of Lykke's Cabinet under Conservative Party politician Ivar Lykke, many Norwegians instead wanted a national unity government led by explorer, scientist, diplomat and Nobel Peace Prize laureate Fridtjof Nansen. Arne Sunde was among a number of prominent Norwegians to sign a declaration calling on Norway's conservative parties to approach King Haakon VII and ask him to request that Nansen form a government of national unity to replace Lykke's Cabinet. In 1929 Sunde became deputy mayor of Aker, where he now lived. He advanced to mayor of the same municipality in 1930, and serving until 1931 with the exception of his Minister of Justice period.

Sunde was appointed Minister of Justice in the Liberal Party of Norway's Mowinckel's Second Cabinet in November 1930. He lost this position in May 1931, when the Agrarian Kolstad's Cabinet took over. From 1932 to 1933, Sunde presided for Norway in the Eastern Greenland Case at the Permanent Court of International Justice. In March 1933, the Agrarian cabinet fell, and Sunde returned to government as Minister of Justice in the Mowinckel's Third Cabinet. The cabinet lasted until March 1935, when it was replaced by the Nygaardsvold's Cabinet.

He was a member of the Norwegian Association for Women's Rights.

=== Supreme Court Justice and banker ===
After his initial political career Sunde first served for one year as a Justice of the Supreme Court of Norway before taking up banking, holding the position of the head of the Oslo office of the bank Bergens Privatbank until the German invasion came in 1940.

== Second World War ==
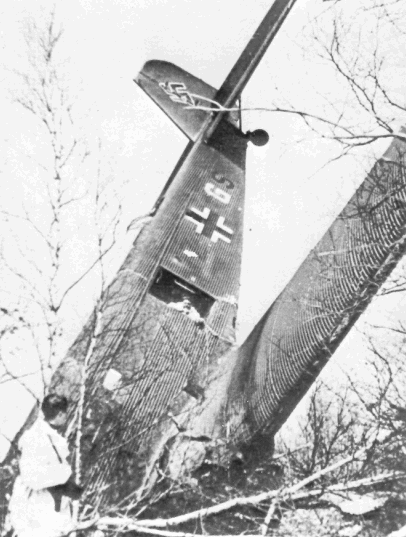
German Junkers Ju 52 transport aircraft downed at Dombås.

=== Norwegian Campaign ===
Arne Sunde, a major in the reserves, participated in the fighting following the German invasion of Norway. On 9 April, Sunde contacted the Norwegian Ministry of Defence, asking where he was to report for service. Sunde was told that the Norwegian mobilization would not start until 11 April, a full two days since the beginning of the German attack. Wishing to take part in the defence of Norway, Sunde set off on skis across Nordmarka north of Oslo on 12 April, seeking troops to join up with.

==== Battle of Dombås ====
The main fighting that Major Arne Sunde participated in during the Norwegian Campaign was the Battle of Dombås where he from 17 to 19 April 1940 led the 1st Battalion, Infantry Regiment 11 and an assortment of other units to victory against a company of German Fallschirmjäger soldiers that had been dropped against the Norwegian railway and road junction of Dombås on 14 April. The German force had been tasked with cutting the rail and road links between the port of Åndalsnes in Western Norway and the Gudbrandsdal valley to the south-east. By 19 April, the leader of the German force, Oberleutnant Herbert Schmidt, asked for a negotiated surrender, but was rejected by Sunde. Major Sunde demanded an unconditional surrender within 10 minutes or else he would resume the artillery bombardment of the surrounded German positions. Nine and a half minutes later the around 150 remaining German Fallschirmjäger soldiers surrendered to the Norwegian forces led by Sunde.

=== In exile ===
After Nygaardsvold's Cabinet requisitioned the Norwegian merchant navy Sunde was ordered to London together with Øivind Lorentzen og Benjamin Vogt to build a Norwegian shipping mission in exile; Nortraship. Sunde left Norway from the western port of Åndalsnes on the British cruiser HMS Galatea in the late hours of 23 April 1940, bringing 200 large crates of gold bars belonging to the Norwegian National Treasury to the United Kingdom. The transport of the gold from the Bank of Norway central bank headquarters in Oslo had been guarded by troops led by his brother, Bjørn Sunde, who was also a major in the Norwegian Army. After arriving in London on 25 April Sunde, being a banker, was given the responsibility for the exiled Norwegians' finances. Shortly after arriving in the UK Sunde managed to secure a £100,000 credit from Hambros Bank. On 7 June 1940, Sunde was appointed consultative Councillor of State without portfolio, as one of two new councillors not from the Labour Party, the other being the Agrarian Party's Anders Fjeldstad. The appointment of the two new councillors of state was mentioned in a speech by King Haakon VII in a radio address to the occupied Norwegian people on 26 August 1940. At the same he time continued as a member of the consultative council of the shipping director. From 19 November 1940 to 1 November 1942, he headed the Norwegian Ministry of Provisioning. When that ministry was restructured on 1 November 1942 Arne Sunde continued as Minister of Shipping until he left the cabinet on 25 June 1945, after the end of the Second World War and the return to Norway of the exiled Norwegian authorities.

==== Conflicts ====
Sunde's time in exile was marked by difficulties, with almost constant conflicts with the leaders of Nortraship. While Sunde and most of the other politicians wanted increased political control over the shipping company, the leadership of Nortraship wanted greater freedom to make business decisions. One result of the conflicts was that the Minister of Shipping's authority was decreased by Royal Resolution on 3 September 1943.

One of the earliest and most dramatic conflicts involving Sunde in London was when he, supported by fellow non-Labour Party ministers Anders Fjelstad and Sven Nielsen, on 6 August 1940 demanded that Minister of Foreign Affairs Halvdan Koht resign from his post. The conflict was based in personal animosities between Sunde and Koht, as well as the impression that Koht had been responsible for Norway's failed policy of neutrality before the German attack in April 1940. Sunde withdrew his demands when he realised that he did not have the support of Prime Minister Johan Nygaardsvold. At the time of the altercation Sunde was one of the leading candidates to take over the Ministry of Foreign Affairs, but was instead given the Ministry of Provisioning after Trygve Lie left that position to become Minister of Foreign Affairs.

Despite the many internal conflicts within the various parts of the Norwegian authorities during their time in exile Sunde defended the Cabinet Nygaardsvold during a 21 October 1942 meeting with four priests of the Norwegian Church Abroad who were accusing Nygaardsvold of excluding people not associated with the Labour Party from influential positions. Sunde stated that in his opinion the Cabinet had always made it a priority to attract competent individuals to its service, regardless of those individuals' political affiliations.

== Post-war ==
=== Dissolving Nortraship ===
Having left the government in 1945, Sunde's first task after the Second World War was to in 1946 head the last board of Nortraship, tasked with dissolving the company.

From 1945 to 1948, Sunde again headed the Oslo office of Bergens Privatbank.

=== UN ambassador ===
From 1949 to 1952, Arne Sunde was the Norwegian ambassador to the United Nations. The perhaps pivotal moment of his career at the United Nations came on 7 July 1950 when he, as President of the Security Council, led the meeting that adopted the United Nations Security Council Resolution 84, recommending United Nations member states to assist the Republic of Korea in resisting the invasion initiated some two weeks earlier by the Democratic People's Republic of Korea. The resolution paved the way for a United States-led UN force in the Korean War. During the negotiations leading up to the resolution Sunde clashed with US ambassador Warren R. Austin, Austin offending Sunde to such a degree that one observer believed that personal relations between the US and Norwegian delegations had been "irreconcilably damaged". At the time the Secretary-General of the United Nations was the Norwegian Trygve Lie and Norway was a non-permanent member of the Security Council. Sunde had also been the UN Security Council President in June 1949. When he was interviewed on his 80th birthday in 1964 Sunde stated that he viewed his time on the Security Council as the absolute high point of his life.

==== Quotations ====
...the stamina and courage of American boys who hardly dreamed 14 days ago that they were to be the first to fight for the ideals and principles of the United Nations . . . Let us hope that we shall not fall too far behind these men in our determination and in our dedication. (Security Council President Sunde about US soldiers fighting in the early phases of the Korean War).

Malik is very rude. And he looks as if he believed in his rudeness. (Ambassador Sunde about fellow United Nations ambassador, Soviet Yakov Malik).

== Post-Korean War ==
From 1953 to 1958, Sunde chaired NATO's control commission on the expenses of jointly financed military installations.

== Honours ==
By 1935, Sunde had been awarded Haakon VII's Jubilee Medal 1905–1930, been made a Chevalier of the French Légion d'honneur and an Officer of the Portuguese Order of Christ. He was later decorated Commander with Star of the Royal Norwegian Order of St. Olav, and given the Defence Medal 1940–1945 and the French Croix de guerre.

A small junction of paths near the river Lysakerelva has been named Arne Sundes plass, "Arne Sunde's square".

== Bibliography ==
- Hauge, Andreas (1995). Kampene i Norge 1940 (in Norwegian). Vol. 1. Sandefjord: Krigshistorisk Forlag. ISBN 82-993369-0-2.
- Øksendal, Asbjørn (1974). Gulltransporten (in Norwegian). Oslo: Aschehoug. ISBN 82-03-06336-5.
- Riste, Olav (1990). Norge i krig – Utefront (in Norwegian). Oslo: Aschehoug. ISBN 82-03-11422-9.
- Voksø, Per (1994). Krigens Dagbok – Norge 1940–1945 (in Norwegian). Oslo: Forlaget Det Beste. ISBN 82-7010-245-8.

Political offices
Preceded by Wilhelm Stenersen	Mayor of Aker; November 1930 – May 1931	Succeeded by Erling Schiøtz
Preceded by Haakon Evjenth	Norwegian Minister of Justice and the Police; November 1930 – May 1931	Succeeded by Asbjørn Lindboe
Preceded by Erling Schiøtz	Mayor of Aker; May 1931 – December 1931	Succeeded by Erling Schiøtz
Preceded by Asbjørn Lindboe	Norwegian Minister of Justice and the Police; 1933–1935	Succeeded by Trygve Lie
Preceded by Trygve Lie	Norwegian Minister of Provisioning; 1940–1942	Succeeded by Anders Frihagen
Preceded by position created	Minister of Shipping; 1942–1945	Succeeded by Tor Skjønsberg
Diplomatic posts
Preceded by	Permanent Representative of Norway to the United Nations; 1949–1952	Succeeded by Hans Engen
Preceded by Jean Chauvel	President of the United Nations Security Council; June 1949	Succeeded by Dmitri Z. Manuilsky
Preceded by Benegal Narsing Rau	President of the United Nations Security Council; July 1950	Succeeded by Yakov A. Malik
