= Eilif Bang =

Norwegian businessman (1892–1953)

Eilif Hvide Bang (15 April 1892 – 28 January 1953) was a Norwegian businessperson.

He was born in Kristiania as a son of consul-general Thomas Cathinco Bang (1863—1929) and Louise Bielke. In 1923 he married Edda Louise Albertovna Schoeneckerl from St. Petersburg.

He finished his secondary education in 1910, took business education in Köln and Dresden, Germany from 1910 to 1912 and worked in Germany, England, France and Sweden from 1912 to 1916. He was hired as office manager at Tofte Cellulosefabrik in 1916, and was promoted to manager in 1927 and chief executive officer in 1929.

He served as president of the Federation of Norwegian Industries from 1947 to 1950. He also chaired the French-Norwegian Chamber of Commerce from 1937, was a board member of Oslo Sparebank, deputy board member of the Norwegian Industrial Bank and supervisory council member of Forsikringsselskapet Norge, the Norwegian America Line (deputy) and Oslo Conservative Party. He was also a council member of Studieselskapet for Norsk Industri and Bygg ditt Land.

He was decorated as a Chevalier of the Légion d'honneur. He died suddenly in January 1953. Marshals at his funeral were Gunnar Holst and Johannes Westergaard.

Business positions
Preceded by Johs. Brunæs	President of the Federation of Norwegian Industries; 1947–1950	Succeeded by Egil Offenberg
