= Ministry of Shipping =

Ministry of Shipping may refer to:

- Ministry of Shipping (Bangladesh)
- Ministry of Shipping (Greece)
- Ministry of Shipping (India)
- Ministry of Shipping (Norway)
- Ministry of Shipping (United Kingdom)
