= Nygaardsvold's Cabinet =

Second Labour cabinet in Norway

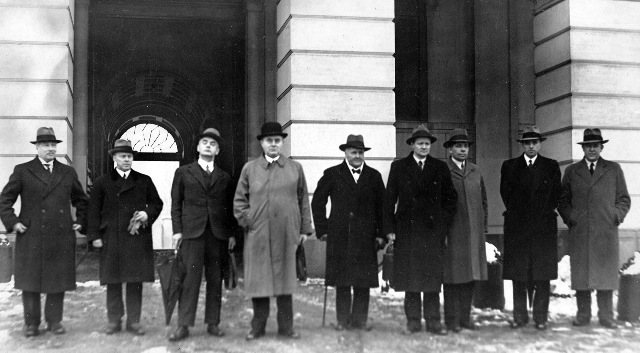
Nygaardsvold's Cabinet. From left: Minister of Finance Adolf Indrebø, Minister of Defence Fredrik Monsen, Minister of Foreign Affairs Halvdan Koht, Prime Minister Johan Nygaardsvold, Minister of Agriculture Hans Ystgaard, Minister of Trade Alfred Madsen, Minister of Social Affairs Kornelius Bergsvik, Minister of Education Nils Hjelmtveit and Minister of Justice Trygve Lie

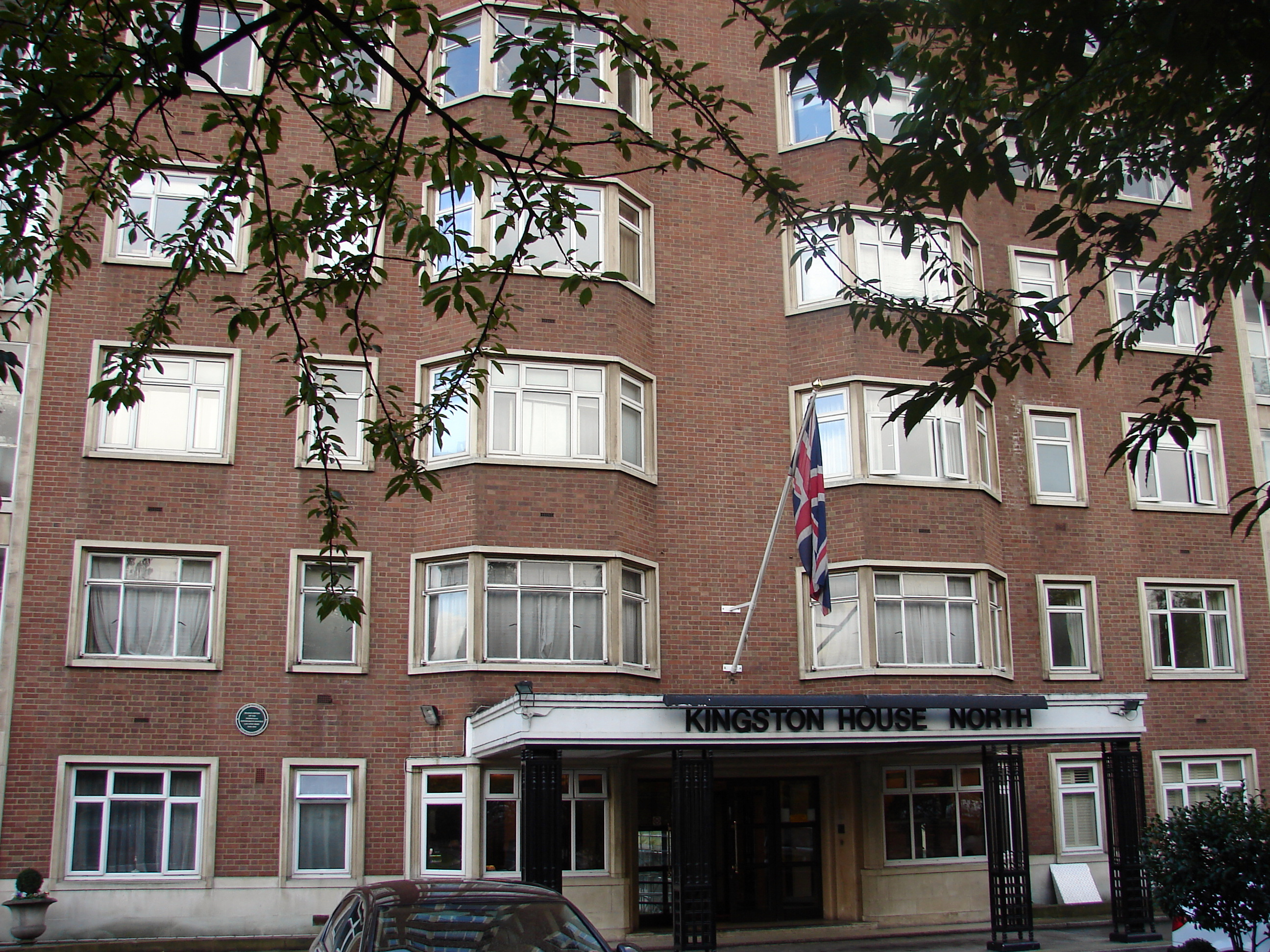
Building in Kingston House estate, London used by the Norwegian government-in-exile.

Nygaardsvold's Cabinet (later becoming the Norwegian government-in-exile) was appointed on 20 March 1935, the second Labour cabinet in Norway. It brought an end to the non-socialist minority governments that had dominated Norwegian politics since the introduction of the parliamentary system in 1884, and replaced it with stable Labour governments that, with the exception of World War II (during which the government remained de jure in power in exile) it would last until the coalition Lyng cabinet in 1963.

Following the brief tenure of the Hornsrud cabinet in the winter of 1928, the Labour Party changed its political stance from revolutionary socialism to social democracy. The main reason for the change was the realization that government power could be used to enact reforms that would lessen the impact of the economic crisis. In the 1933 election the party used the slogans "Work for everyone" and "Country and city, hand in hand". The last time the party portrayed itself as "revolutionary" was the 1930 election.

The Labour Party advanced in the 1933 election but did not get a majority. Instead, they made a compromise with the Farmer Party, allowing Nygaardsvold to enter the Council of State. The party also failed to gain a majority in the 1936 election, but stayed in office thanks to fluctuating support from various opposition parties.

The night before 9 April 1940, the Norwegian Government, like most other authorities in the country, was surprised by the German invasion. At first, it chose resistance over capitulation. The Government left Norway on 7 June 1940 after the German conquest and established itself in London the same day, along with King Haakon VII and Crown Prince Olav.

Back in Norway, over the course of the war, four de facto governments were led by Vidkun Quisling and Josef Terboven. The Government-in-exile is sometimes referred to as the London Cabinet. It returned to Norway on 31 May 1945 aboard the UK troop ship RMS Andes. On 12 June, Nygaardsvold announced his resignation, and on 25 June, the pan-political Gerhardsen cabinet took over.

Below are the four de facto governments in Oslo during the war, either sympathizing with or appointed by German forces. The Reichskommissar in Oslo was Josef Terboven.

- Quisling cabinet (first) (1940)
- Christiansen government (1940)
- Terboven government (1940–42)
- Second Quisling government (1942–45)

== Cabinet members ==
| Portfolio | Minister | Took office | Left office | Party |
|---|---|---|---|---|
| Prime Minister | Johan Nygaardsvold | 20 March 1935 | 25 June 1945 | Labour |
| Minister of Agriculture | Hans Ystgaard | 20 March 1935 | 25 June 1945 | Labour |
| Minister of Church Affairs and Education | Nils Hjelmtveit | 20 March 1935 | 25 June 1945 | Labour |
| Minister of Defence | Christian Fredrik Monsen | 20 March 1935 | 15 November 1935 | Labour |
| Minister of Defence | Adolf Indrebø | 20 December 1935 | 15 August 1936 | Labour |
| Minister of Defence | Oscar Torp | 20 December 1935 | 15 August 1936 | Labour |
| Minister of Defence | Christian Fredrik Monsen | 15 August 1936 | 22 December 1939 | Labour |
| Minister of Defence | Birger Ljungberg | 22 December 1939 | 28 November 1942 | Conservative |
| Minister of Defence | Oscar Torp | 28 November 1942 | 25 June 1945 | Labour |
| Minister of Finance | Adolf Indrebø | 20 March 1935 | 13 November 1936 | Labour |
| Minister of Finance | Kornelius Bergsvik | 13 November 1936 | 1 July 1939 | Labour |
| Minister of Finance | Oscar Torp | 1 July 1939 | 28 November 1941 | Labour |
| Minister of Finance | Paul Hartmann | 28 November 1941 | 25 June 1945 | Norwegian resistance movement |
| Minister of Foreign Affairs | Halvdan Koht | 20 March 1935 | 19 November 1940 | Labour |
| Minister of Foreign Affairs | Trygve Lie | 19 November 1940 | 25 June 1945 | Labour |
| Minister of Justice | Trygve Lie | 20 March 1935 | 19 November 1939 | Labour |
| Minister of Justice | Terje Wold | 19 November 1939 | 25 June 1945 | Labour |
| Minister of Labour | Johan Nygaardsvold | 20 March 1935 | 2 October 1939 | Labour |
| Minister of Labour | Olav Hindahl | 2 October 1939 | 25 June 1945 | Labour |
| Minister of Social Affairs | Kornelius Bergsvik | 20 March 1935 | 13 November 1936 | Labour |
| Minister of Social Affairs | Oscar Torp | 13 November 1936 | 1 July 1939 | Labour |
| Minister of Social Affairs | Sverre Støstad | 1 July 1939 | 25 June 1945 | Labour |
| Minister of Shipping | Arne Sunde | 1 October 1942 | 25 June 1945 | Liberal |
| Minister of Supply | Trygve Lie | 2 October 1939 | 19 November 1940 | Labour |
| Minister of Supply | Arne Sunde | 19 November 1940 | 1 October 1942 | Liberal |
| Minister of Supply | Anders Rasmus Frihagen | 1 October 1942 | 25 June 1945 | Labour |
| Minister of Trade, Shipping, Industry, Crafts and Fisheries | Alfred Madsen | 20 March 1935 | 1 July 1939 | Labour |
| Minister of Trade, Shipping, Industry, Crafts and Fisheries | Trygve Lie | 1 July 1939 | 2 October 1939 | Labour |
| Minister of Trade, Shipping, Industry, Crafts and Fisheries | Anders Rasmus Frihagen | 2 October 1939 | 7 June 1940 | Labour |
| Minister of Trade, Shipping, Industry, Crafts and Fisheries | Terje Wold | 7 June 1940 | April 1942 | Labour |
| Minister of Trade, Shipping, Industry, Crafts and Fisheries | Anders Rasmus Frihagen | April 1942 | 1 October 1942 | Labour |
| Minister of Trade, Shipping, Industry, Crafts and Fisheries | Olav Hindahl | 1 October 1942 | 9 March 1945 | Labour |
| Minister of Trade, Shipping, Industry, Crafts and Fisheries | Sven Nielsen | 9 March 1945 | 25 June 1945 | Conservative |

== See also ==
- Norwegian Armed Forces in exile

| Preceded by Third cabinet Mowinckel | Norwegian Council of State; 1935–1945 | Succeeded by de facto Quisling cabinet (1942) de jure First cabinet Gerhardsen (1945) |
