= Battle for Kvam =

Battle in the 1940 German invasion of Norway

Battle Of Kvam
- Part of the Norwegian campaign of World War II
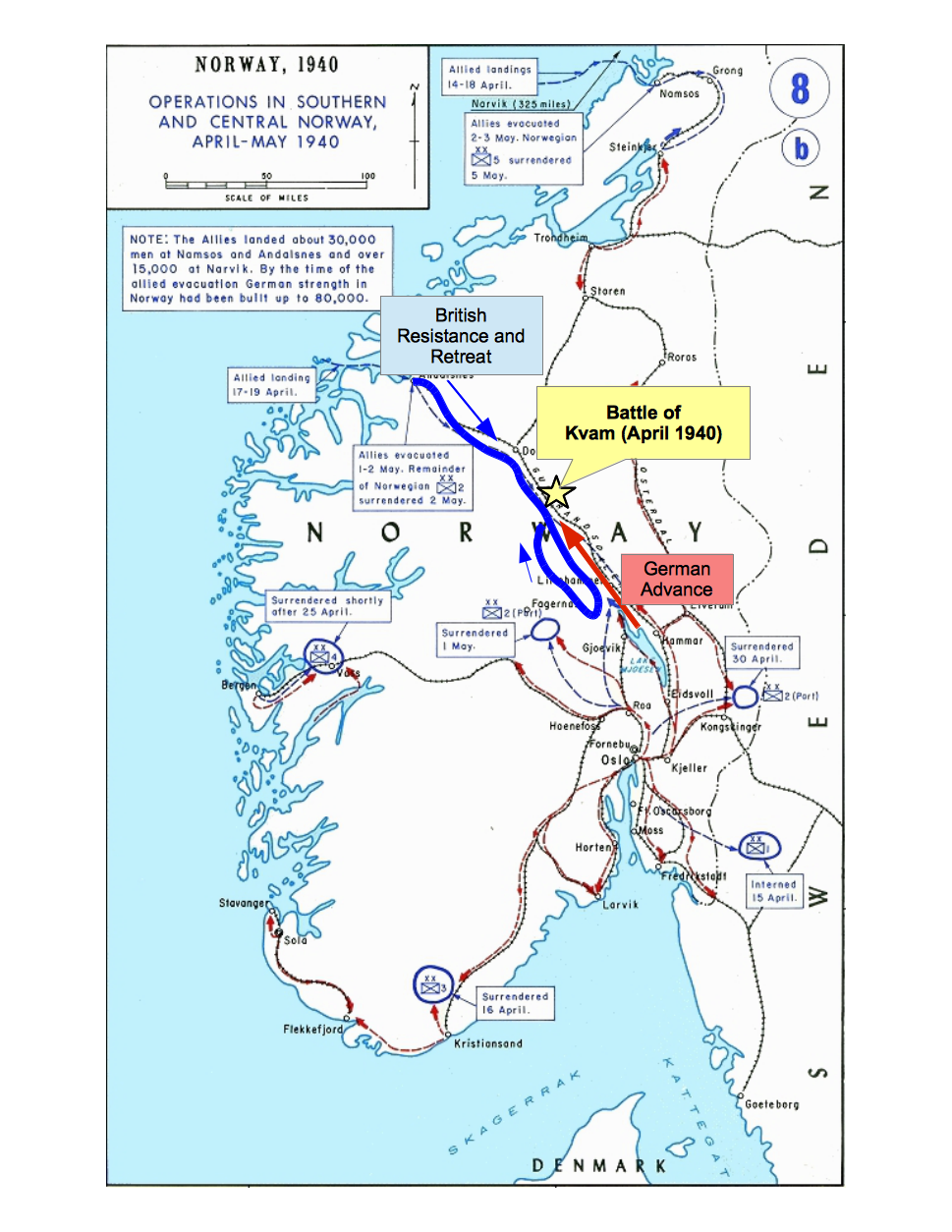
- Battle of Kvam, 25–26 April 1940
| Date | 25–26 April 1940 |
| Location | Kvam, Norway |
| Result | German victory |

Belligerents
| United Kingdom; Norway | Germany |

Commanders and leaders
| (United Kingdom) Bernard Paget (United Kingdom) H. E. F. Smyth (22 April–12:00pm 25 April) (United Kingdom) A. L. Kent-Lemon (12:00pm 25–26 April) (United Kingdom) E.E.E. Cass (Norway) Otto Ruge (Norway) Jacob Hvinden Haug | (Nazi Germany) Richard Pellengahr |

Strength
| (United Kingdom) 15th Infantry Brigade; King's Own Yorkshire Light Infantry; 1st Battalion; York and Lancaster Regiment; 1st Battalion | 8,500; 1 mountain infantry battalion; 6 infantry battalions; 1 motorized machine gun battalion; 1 tank platoon (7 Pz.I and II, 1 NbFz); 2 artillery batteries (10,5cm leFH 18) |

Casualties and losses
| (United Kingdom) : 54 killed (Norway) : 3 killed | Light |
- 3 civilians killed

The Battle for Kvam took place 25 and 26 April 1940, in the Gudbrandsdal Valley in the village of Kvam in Nord-Fron Municipality in Oppland county, Norway. The battle was between British, Norwegian, and German troops. The Germans were moving rapidly north up the river valley to conquer central Norway. In the battle, soldiers from 1st Battalion, York and Lancaster Regiment and the 1st Battalion, King's Own Yorkshire Light Infantry (KOYLI), together with their Norwegian counterparts, held a rapidly advancing German army at bay for two days. It was one of the hardest-fought battles of the Norwegian Campaign.

== Background ==
The German invasion of Norway began on 9 April 1940. It was the first instance of a modern combined operation of land, sea and air forces. The Germans started by taking the major ports of Norway, but once they had accomplished those goals, they began to move through the interior of the country. At the outset of the invasion, King Haakon moved to escape capture by the Germans. He and his wife, Crown Princess Martha, together with their children, including Crown Prince Olav made their way east toward Hamar in the Gudbrandsdal Valley. When news of their escape reached the German high command. they ordered 100 highly trained German paratroopers to start chasing the royals and officials of the Norwegian government. As a result, the royal family had to stay constantly on the move through the Gudbandsdal Valley and the Swedish border. While the King and his family eventually made it to neutral Sweden, a larger mechanized German force followed the paratroopers and began to make its way up the Gudbrandsdal Valley, moving north toward Otta.

A British force, codenamed "Sickleforce" was dispatched to Aandalsnes, under Major General Bernard Paget. Originally, the force was to be the southern arm of a pincer attack to recover Trondheim, which the Germans had seized. At the urgent request of the Norwegian commander in chief, Major General Otto Ruge, the first element of the force to disembark (the Territorial 148th Brigade under Brigadier H. de R. Morgan) was diverted 140 miles (230 km) south to reinforce the exhausted Norwegians attempting to defend Lillehammer. In actions at Balbergkamp on 21-22 April and Tretten on 23 April, the brigade, lacking training and equipment, was reduced to only 300 men.

The second part of "Sickleforce" landed at Aandalsnes starting on 23 April. This was the regular 15th Brigade under Brigadier H. E. F. Smyth, consisting of the 1st Battalion, York and Lancaster Regiment, the 1st Battalion, King's Own Yorkshire Light Infantry (KOYLI) and the 1st Battalion, the Green Howards, which landed a few days later. The brigade was better trained and prepared than 148th Brigade, but it lacked some important equipment (some of which had been lost when the transport vessel "Cedarbank" was torpedoed by a U-boat).

== The Battle ==
=== 24 April ===
On the night that the first elements of 15th Brigade landed, the battle for Central Norway had already been lost and the British were retreating in the face of the German advance up the Gudbrandsdal Valley. Major General Ruge had already informed the British commanders that his troops were completely exhausted and any lines of defense in the Gudbrandsdal Valley were near collapse.

Lt. Col. E.E.E. Cass was in command of the 1st Battalion of the KOYLI, which made its way quickly by rail towards Kvam. They arrived at Kvam in the early morning hours of the 25th. When they reached Kvam, they encountered Norwegian and British soldiers in full retreat from the German advance at Ringebu to the south.

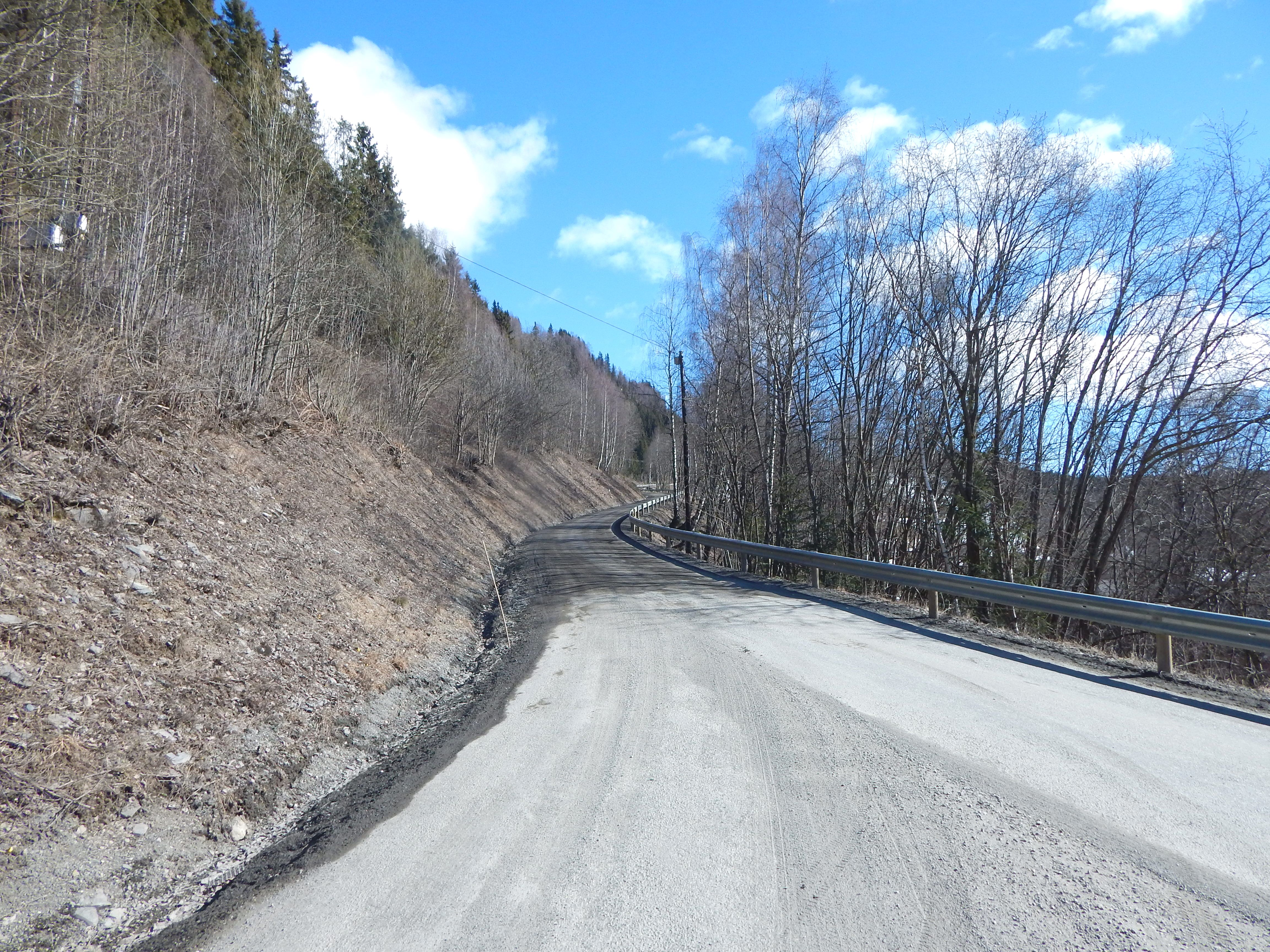
Highway near Kvam facing south. Note the steep slope on the east side of the highway.

==== Topography of Kvam ====
The topography of Kvam made it a perfect location to set up a defense against the advancing German army. Downriver from Kvam is a sharp bend in the Lågen River, known as the "Kvam's knee." Above the bend in the river, the Gudbrandsdal Valley widens to flat and open farmland, giving good fields of fire. At the bend in the river, the road is narrow with very steep hills to the east. There is a large island on the Lågen where the river splits. Due to ice jams on the river, much of the island was flooded. Battlefield accounts refer to the island as Viksøya (on most maps, it is called Storøya). There are hills on the island near the road directly opposite steep slopes to the east. The hillsides were still covered in knee deep snow and the local lakes were still solidly frozen over to the point that the British were briefly able to establish an airfield on one frozen lake at Leskasjog a few days before the battle. In April at Kvam's latitude, civil twilight begins around 4:30 a.m. and ends around 10:00 p.m. It was at the small village of Kvam that the British set up their defenses to stop the German advance.

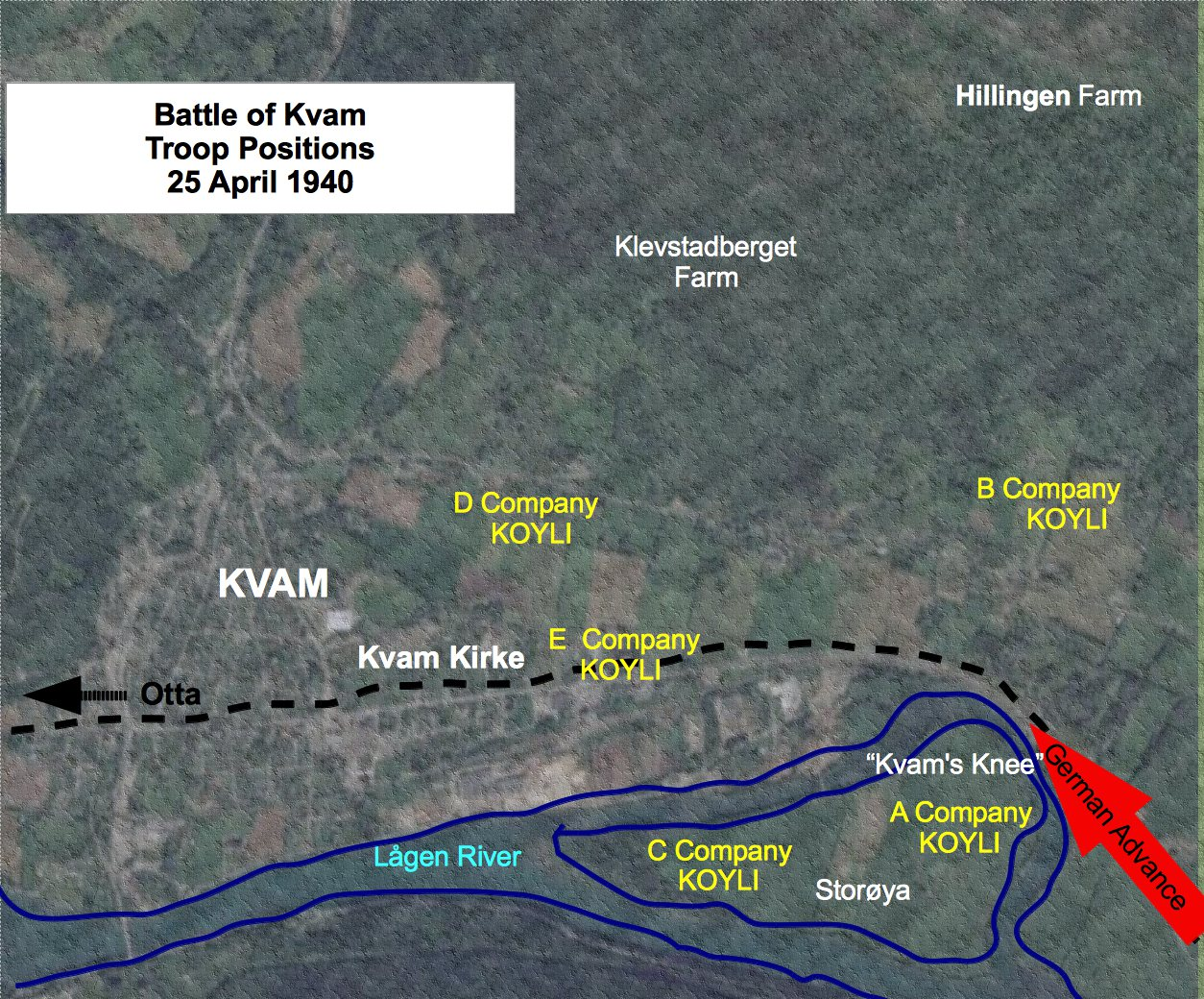
Battle of Kvam troop positions on 25 April 1940

=== 25 April ===
In order to slow the German movement up the Gudbrandsdal valley, the retreating British and Norwegians first tried to blow up a very narrow portion of the road south of Kvam called the Kvamsporten [the gates of Kvam]. This narrow portion of the road was lined with steep rock cliffs. The demolition did little to slow the advancing Germans.

A few British planes from the airfield on the nearby lake appeared in the sky, offering encouragement of air support in the early hours of the 25 April; however, the Germans quickly destroyed the airfield, any surviving planes retreated north to safety, and British airpower was non-existent during the battle.

Upon his arrival, Brig. Gen. Smyth set up his headquarters in front of the Kvam Church. The British soldiers of 1st KOYLI arrived around 4:15 a.m. They quickly shed their heavy arctic clothing and, carrying only their weapons, ammunition and '37 web gear, began to set up defensive positions. Lt. Col. Cass put "A" and "C" companies on the island in the Lågen river west of the road and "B" company east of the road up on the steep slopes. The British soldiers were armed with rifles and bayonets, Bren light machine guns, and two Ordnance ML 3 inch mortars. In addition to their light weapons, the British soldiers had five 25 mm Hotchkiss anti-tank guns set up at the forefront, and three in support further behind.

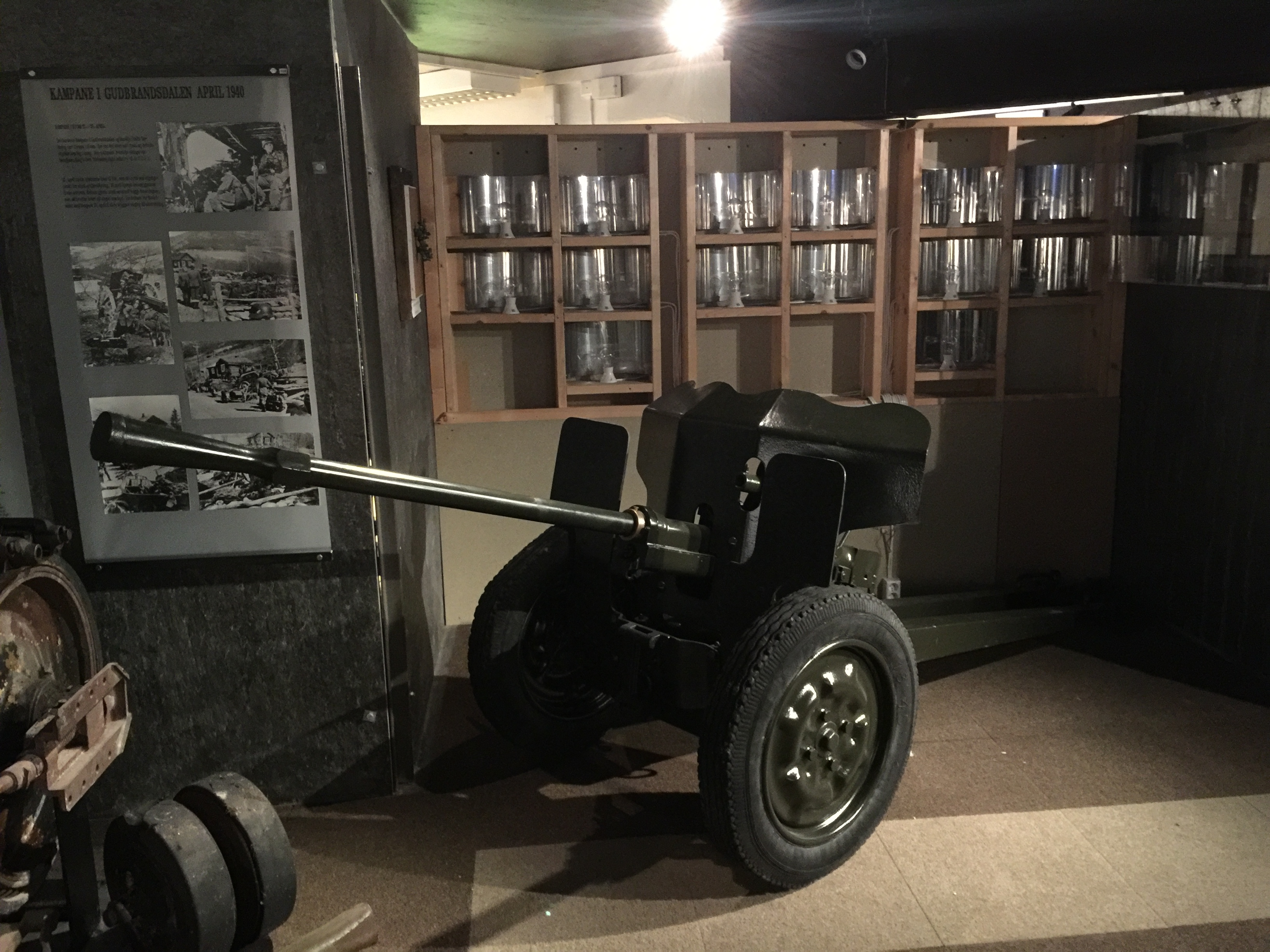
Hotchkiss 25mm anti tank gun at Gudbrandsdal Krigsminnesamling

General Jacob Hvinden Haug had informed the British that Norwegian soldiers under his command, who had dug in south of Kvam, could hold until the evening of the 25th. Unfortunately at 7:30 a.m. on the 25th, the Norwegian soldiers moved into Kvam, carrying their wounded through the British lines. There was now nothing between the British and the advancing German army.

The advanced elements of the German forces came up the road at 11:50 a.m. As the Germans approached, the first up the road was a Panzer II tank, followed by a light tank and an armored car. The KOYLI held their fire until the Germans were within 150 yards, when they opened fire disabling the tanks and causing immediate casualties on the German infantry, who were accompanying the tanks. The Germans immediately responded with their artillery and mortars. The heavy artillery and mortar barrage caused heavy casualties for the British soldiers near the front line positions.

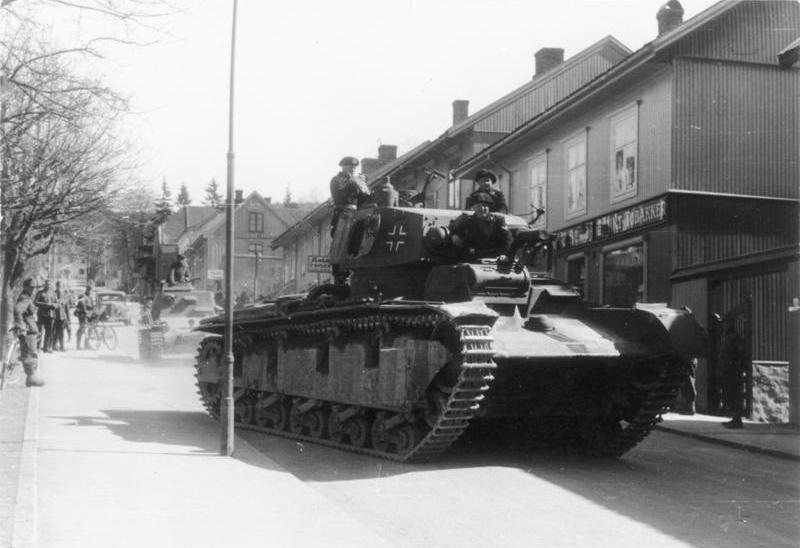
German Neubaufahrzeug advancing through the streets of Lillehammer in April 1940.

At noon, Brigadier General Smyth was badly wounded by shrapnel from the artillery and was forced to relinquish command to Lt. Col A.L. Kent-Lemon, battalion commander of the York and Lancaster Regiment.

After a brief pause, the Germans infantry moved up the slope on the east side of the road to attack "B" company, but they were repulsed. The Germans then moved across the frozen river to attack the "A" company position on the island. "A" company had already suffered heavy losses from the artillery barrage, and was unable to stop the German offensive. By mid-afternoon, "A" company ceased to exist as an independent company, having lost 4 officers and 85 other ranks. "C" company moved forward to reinforce the line.

At 5:30 p.m., the first reinforcements arrived from the 1st York and Lancaster Regiment, which reinforced the left flank.

By nightfall, company "B" on the east slope had held its position against the Germans, but its position was precarious. It decided to withdraw toward the village center of Kvam. Company "B" was reportedly in high spirits, having fought off several German attacks. In their withdrawal, the company had to abandon two of its Hotchkiss anti-tank guns.

At the end of the first day of fighting, the British had 89 casualties killed or wounded, while the Germans had 4 soldiers killed.

=== 26 April ===
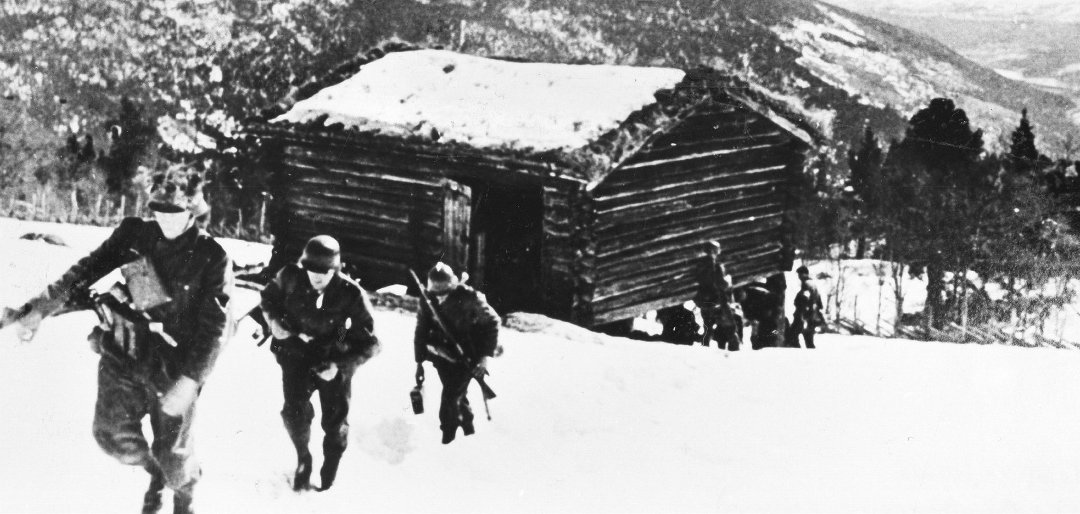
German soldiers moving past Hillingen seter on 26 April 1940

At 5:30 a.m. the next day, the Germans commenced an intense artillery and machine gun barrage on the KOYLI. The Germans then commenced a series of infantry attacks against the left flank held by "C" company of the York and Lancaster Regiment. These attacks were all beaten off.

At 9:00 a.m., the Germans continued to attack the left flank of the British. This time they moved further up the steep hillside to the farmstead called Hillingen seter. Here they were met by three brave Norwegian soldiers, who though outnumbered, fought them off, losing their lives in the process.

At 11:00 a.m., the Germans renewed their attack, and now had air support, as well as increased artillery, to bomb the village of Kvam. They began to have some success infiltrating the British lines.

Around 1:00 p.m., the Germans brought tanks down the road toward "B" and "C" companies of the KOYLI in front of the village. The British had three of their 25 mm Hotchkiss anti-tank guns positioned to defend the road; however, a light road block had been created across the road using tree branches. These tree branches prevented any of the anti-tanks guns from finding their targets.

According to Plevy, Captain A.F. McRiggs crossed the road twice, fully exposed to machine gun fire from the German positions, to remove the debris from the road. Just as he finished, a bullet hit him in the shoulder, but one anti-tank gun could now see the tank.

Corporal Stokes of the York and Lancaster Regiment was in command of the third Hotchkiss gun beside the road at the back of the village. He could now see the tank and with his first shot he stopped the tank. His second shot set it on fire and left it at the side of the road. Moments later a second tank came up the road. Stokes waited until it was immediately beside the first tank, and he destroyed it with two shots in exactly the same way he stopped the first. Then the Germans sent an armored car rapidly down the road, and when it came between the two tanks, Corporal Stokes knocked it out with one shot. The three disabled vehicles now blocked the road. Corporal Stokes realized that his Hotchkiss gun was about to become a prime target, so he pulled his crew away from the position just before the Germans destroyed it. Stokes and his crew now became infantrymen.

Around 4:00 p.m., the British were in danger of being flanked on the left, but a company from the York and Lancaster battalion managed to hold them off. Then a company of 40 Norwegian skiers came down from high on the slopes above the battle. These Norwegian ski troops under the command of Paul Jørgenvåg opened fire on the Germans from a long distance up on the valley side. Although the fire had little effect from that distance, the Germans were forced to retreat because of their exposed position.

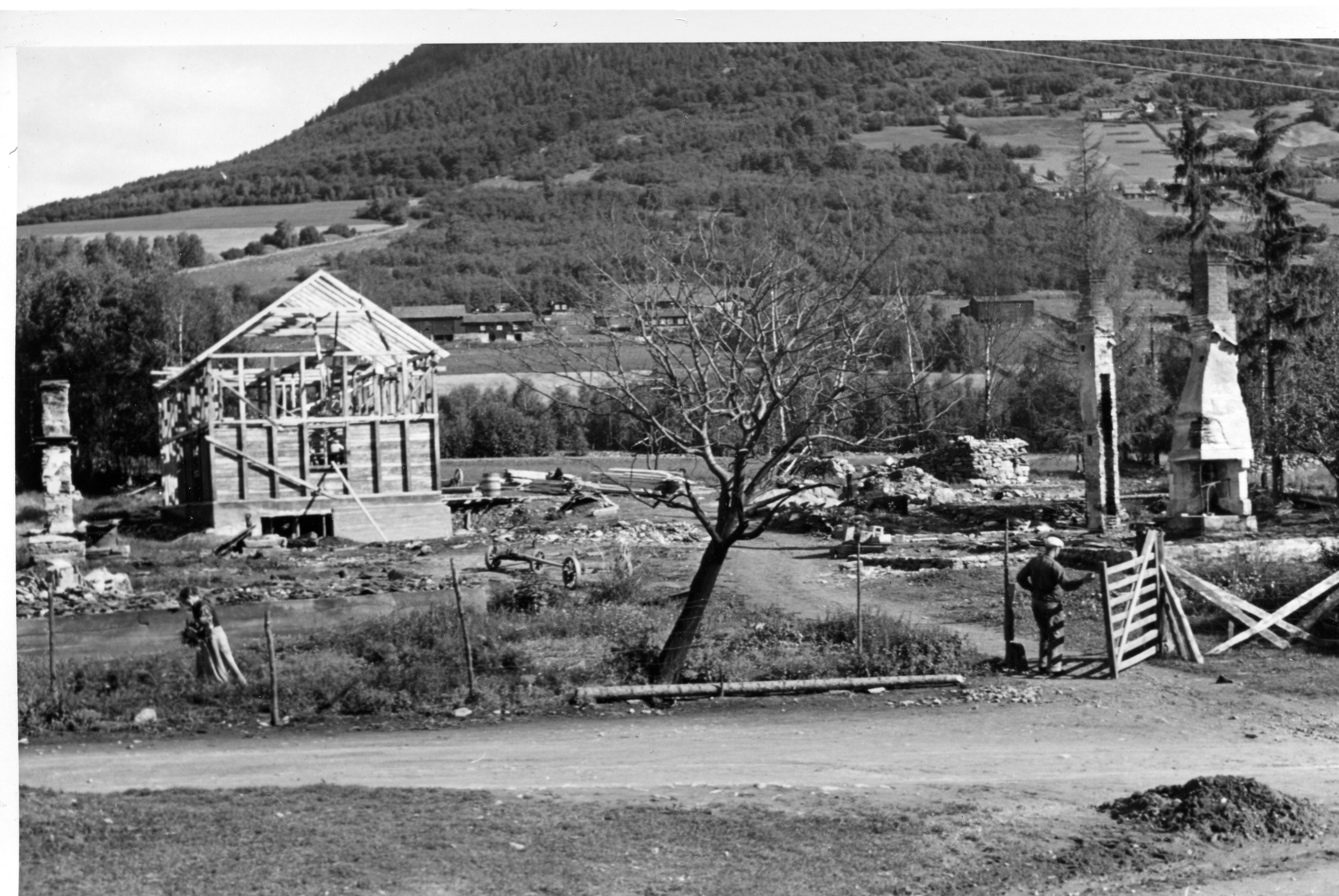
Residents of Kvam rebuilding shortly after the battle in 1940.

Unfortunately the situation was deteriorating and at 5:00 p.m., General Paget issued orders for Kvam to be abandoned at 11:00 p.m. and the companies were to retreat behind new positions at Kjørem approximately 4–5 km further north, where companies from the York and Lancaster Regiment and the Green Howards had set up a new defensive position.

At 6:00 p.m., the Germans gained full control of the island in the Lågen. German artillery began to fire phosphorus shells into the forests where several British companies were in position, and the resulting forest fires forced the British to escape. Still the British held until ordered to retreat by General Paget.

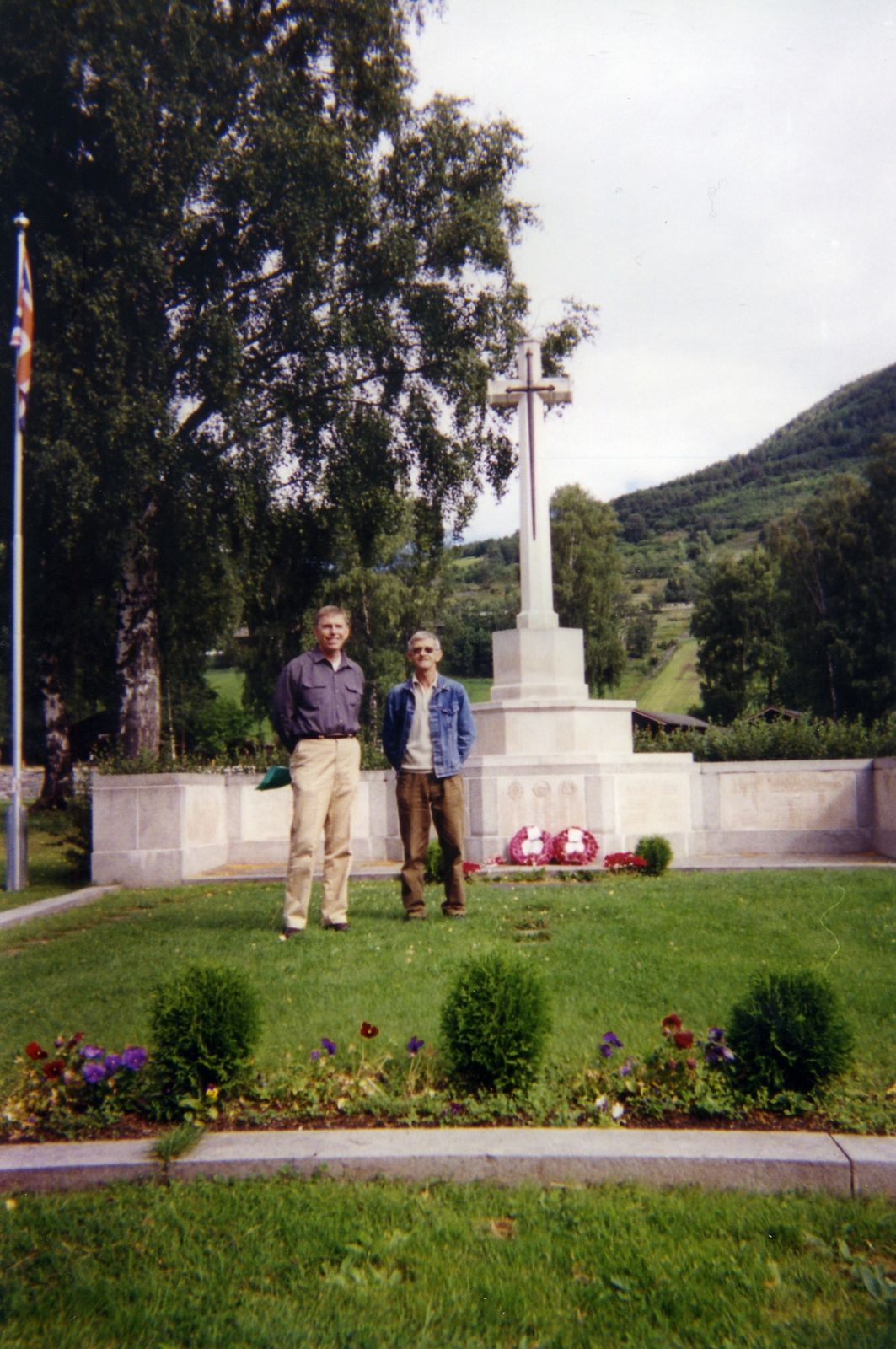
Memorial to 54 British soldiers killed in the Battle for Kvam, Norway, 25–26 April 1940

The battle in Kvam on 25 and 26 April 1940 was the hardest in southern and central Norway. 1st Battalion KOYLI and 1st Battalion York and Lancaster had 54 soldiers killed. In addition, three Norwegian soldiers and three Norwegian civilians were killed in Kvam.

The three civilians killed included a Dane, Søren Sørensen, who was staying on the Svarthaugen farm. When he saw that the farm was burning, he went down to save the farm animals. After the battle, he was found near the railway line with three bullets through the head.

The other civilian was Petter Klomstad at Kjestad farm. He had seen the farm on fire and he ran to help a 92 year old bed-ridden woman on the farm. When some grenades began exploding, he ran into the barn for shelter. When he ran out of the barn, he was killed by shrapnel from a grenade.

Later in the day, 70-year-old Mari Bakken returned to her house to pick up more clothes. Her son found her in the courtyard the following morning with a bullet through her heart.

== Aftermath ==
Over 70 buildings in Kvam were burned to the ground as a result of the fighting. The village and church were essentially leveled. Families were left homeless and lost everything. One survivor recalled how residents lost their bank passbooks in the fire. It became necessary for each family to meet with the local bank boards to settle accounts with the bank.

The 54 British soldiers killed in the battle were buried in the Kvam churchyard. Today, a monument to the British soldiers stands in the Kvam churchyard. In addition, a war museum provides artifacts and information on the battle.

The three Norwegian soldiers who lost their lives in the fighting at Hillingen seter (farm) have been memorialized by a monument on the farmstead. Today, there is a very popular hiking trail to the Hillingen seter and the war memorial to the three brave Norwegians who died there defending their country.

The retreating British fought another delaying action at Kjørem on 27 April, and another at Otta on 28 April. After this action, fought mainly by the 1st Green Howards, the British were able to break contact with the Germans. "Sickleforce" was evacuated from Aandalsnes by 31 April.

In 2014, the main north-south highway up the Gudbrandsdal through Kvam was rebuilt and widened. During construction, the work crews came across unexploded ordnance from the battle near Kvam. Construction had to be halted while Norwegian military units moved in to dispose of the ordnance.

== See also ==
- List of British military equipment of World War II
- List of Norwegian military equipment of World War II
- List of German military equipment of World War II
