= Sara Bache-Wiig =

American mycologist (1894–1971)

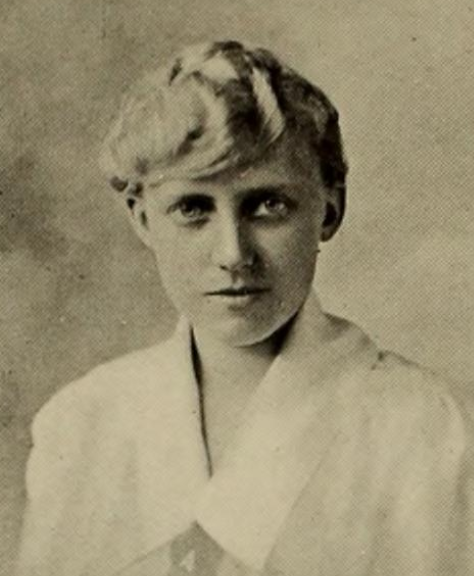
- Sara Bache Wiig, from the 1918 Smith College yearbook
- Born: October 4, 1894; Bøn, Norway
- Died: September 9, 1971 (aged 76)
- Occupations: Mycologist, botany professor
- Relatives: Jens Bache-Wiig (uncle)

Sara Bache-Wiig (October 4, 1894 – September 9, 1971) was a Norwegian-born American mycologist and botany professor.

== Early life and education ==
Bache-Wiig was born in Bøn, Norway, the daughter of Carl Bache-Wiig and Bertha Myher Bache-Wiig. Her father was a chemical engineer. Her uncle was engineer Jens Bache-Wiig. She graduated from Smith College in 1918, and earned a master's degree in plant pathology at Cornell University in 1919, with a thesis titled "The Graftage of Fruit Trees". She pursued further studies in Paris in the 1920s, and she completed doctoral studies at Cornell in 1939 under advisor Harry Morton Fitzpatrick.

== Career ==
Bache-Wiig taught botany at Smith College for 41 years, chaired the department twice, and was acting curator of the school's herbarium in 1948. Her professional publications included "Contributions to the Life History of a System Fungous Parasite, Cryptomycina Pteridis" (1939), "Further Notes on Cryptomycina Pteridis" (1952), and "The Fungistatic Barrier Effect of "S-Coated" Cotton Used as Vial Plugs" (1954), which all appeared in the journal Mycologia.

Bache-Wiig also wrote poems "A Jester", "Morning", and "Unscientific Investigation", for the Smith College Monthly. She was a member of Phi Beta Kappa, the National Consumers League, the American Association of University Professors, the American Society of Plant Taxonomists, and of the Mycological Society of America.

== Personal life ==
Bache-Wiig died in 1971, aged 76 years.
