= Battle of Dombås =

1940 battle between Norwegian army forces and German paratroops

- Part of the Norwegian campaign of the Second World War
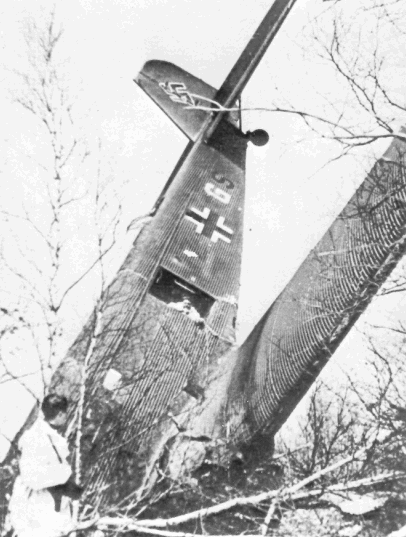
- German Junkers Ju 52 downed at Dombås
Date	14–19 April 1940 (5 days)
Location	Dombås area in Dovre Municipality, Gudbrandsdal, Norway 62°00′30″N 9°13′42″E
Result	Norwegian victory: German Fallschirmjäger company blocks the north–south and west–east rail and road systems for five days before surrendering

Belligerents
Norway	Germany

Commanders and leaders
14–17 April: Ivar Navelsaker; 17–19 April: Arne Sunde	Herbert Schmidt (POW)

Strength
–17 April: (Norway) 2nd Battalion, Infantry Regiment 11 (Norway) No. 1 Company of Infantry Regiment 5; 17–19 April: (Norway) 1st Battalion, Infantry Regiment 11 (Norway) No. 1 Company of Infantry Regiment 5 •Machine gun platoon from NoAAS Jagevingen (United Kingdom) 40 mm anti-aircraft gun 19 April: •Rail-mounted howitzer manned by Royal Marines	(Nazi Germany) 4 officers and 181 men of the 1st Company, (Nazi Germany) 1st Regiment of the 7th Flieger Division

Casualties and losses
20 dead 20 wounded	During the drop: 15 dead, 20 wounded and 14 injured 7 Junkers Ju 52s shot down, an eighth Ju 52 landed in Sweden and sank through a frozen lake. During the fighting: 6 killed 6 wounded ~150 captured
- ~ 150 German soldiers captured (POW) 7 Junkers Ju 52s shot down 21 killed and 40 wounded (executed) / (WIA) Herbert Schmidt (POW)

The Battle of Dombås was fought between Norwegian Army infantry forces and German Fallschirmjäger paratroops in mid-April 1940. As part of their conquest of Norway south of Trondheim, and as a countermeasure against reported Allied landings in the Romsdal area of south-western Norway, the Germans dropped a company of paratroopers near the vital railroad junction of Dombås on 14 April 1940. For the next five days, the German force blocked the Dovre Line railroad line between Oslo and Trondheim, as well as the main road between the two cities.

== Background ==
Shortly after the German invasion of Norway on 9 April 1940, the Allies launched their own campaign in Norway to support the Norwegian Defence Force and prevent the Germans in seizing control of the strategically important country.

On 13 April, Generaloberst Nikolaus von Falkenhorst—the commander of the German invasion forces in Norway—received orders from the Oberkommando der Wehrmacht (Armed Forces High Command; OKW) in Berlin to seize control of the village of Dombås, some 336 km (209 mi) north of Oslo, by paratroop attack. The reason for the OKW's decision was a false report of Allied landings at Åndalsnes, an event that only occurred several days later. The main task at hand for the German troops was the destruction of the railroad, as well as blocking any Allied advance inland, particularly south through the Gudbrandsdal valley.

== Opposing forces ==
=== German ===
The German force air dropped on Dombås was the 1st Company of the 1st Battalion of the 1st Regiment of the 7th Flieger Division. Based at Heimatstandort Stendal near Magdeburg the unit was ordered to Norway on 12 April, landing at Fornebu Airport near Oslo on 13 April. 1st Company was commanded by Oberleutnant Herbert Schmidt and was 185 strong, armed with light weaponry and 22 MG34 machine guns; four of which were mounted on tripods for the medium machine gun role. While the other four companies of the battalion had been sent into action on the first day of the German invasion of Denmark and Norway, the 1st Company had initially been held in reserve.

=== Norwegian ===
The Norwegian force initially based at Dombås was the 2nd Battalion of Infantry Regiment 11. Two days after the attack No. 1 Company of Infantry Regiment 5 arrived as reinforcements and on 17 April 2 Battalion was replaced by its sister unit, 1st Battalion of Infantry Regiment 11. Reinforcements in the form of a machine gun platoon and an anti-aircraft gun also arrived on 17 April. On the last day of the battle, the Norwegians were joined by some of the first British forces to see action on land in Norway when a howitzer manned by Royal Marines joined the fighting.

==== Ivar Navelsaker ====
Ivar Navelsaker (7 November 1893 – 3 February 1966) was a Norwegian military officer who, during the Norwegian Campaign in 1940, was in command of the 2nd Battalion, Infantry Regiment 11 during the Battle of Dombås.

Navelsaker was born in Nordfjordeid to Ivar and Nille Navelsaker. He graduated as military officer in 1917. He married Gudrun Cappelen in 1927. He also studied business, and lectured at the Bergens handelsgymnas og handelsskole from 1918 to 1943.

He was a prisoner of war from April 1943, interned in Grune, Schildberg and Luckenwalde, until the end of World War II. From 1946 he served as colonel and head or the Møre Infantry Regiment. He died in Molde in February 1966.

== Battle ==
=== Day one ===
At around 17:00 Norwegian time on 14 April, fifteen Junkers Ju 52 transport aircraft took off from Fornebu Airport near Oslo in hail and sleet with low cloud cover. An hour earlier, one Ju 52 had flown a reconnaissance flight over the drop area at Dombås without being able to see anything through the cloud cover.

Even though the officers on the site wished to postpone the mission due to the weather conditions the fact that the mission was based on a direct command from Adolf Hitler meant that it had to be carried out despite the risks involved.

The mission the German Fallschirmjäger embarked on was the second opposed paratroop attack in history, the first had occurred five days previously when the Norwegian airbase of Sola near Stavanger was captured during the 9 April invasion of Norway.

==== The drop ====
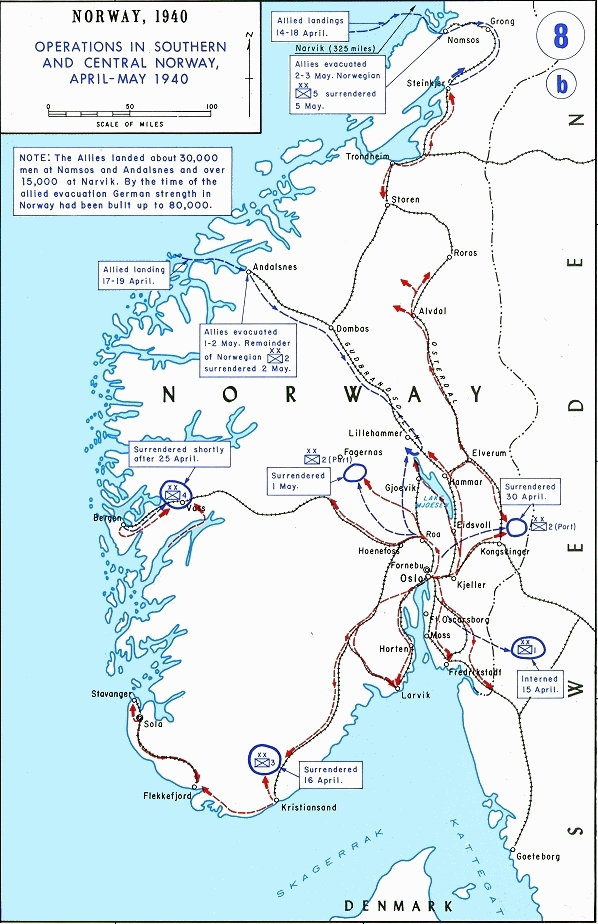
Map of the ground campaign in southern Norway in April and May, 1940. Dombås is in the centre of the top half of the map.

When the German aircraft arrived over their target area, after a 275 km (171 mi) flight, small breaks in the cloud cover enabled most of the Ju 52s to drop their sticks (loads) of paratroopers. The poor weather conditions led to the Germans being spread over a large area, stretching from Lesja 20 km (12 mi) west of the target, Vålåsjø 18 km (11 mi) north-east of the target and locations 8 km (5 mi) to the south in the Gudbrandsdal valley.

==== Fighting the II/IR11 ====
To the misfortune of the German paratroopers, their target area was coincidentally also the temporary base and encampment of the 2nd Battalion of the Norwegian Army's Infantry Regiment 11 (II/IR 11). The battalion had been mobilised in Molde a few days previously and had arrived by train in Dombås in the evening of 13 April. The deployment had been made in preparation for what the Norwegian Army High Command expected would be a major attempt at reconquering Trondheim in cooperation with Allied forces. Although there were no anti-aircraft guns in the area, II/IR11 had positioned their 7.92 mm (0.312 in) Colt M/29 heavy machine guns on anti-aircraft mounts in order to provide some basic low-level air defence.

The arrival of the German aircraft over Dombås came as a surprise to the Norwegian forces who nonetheless soon opened fire on the Ju 52s with all available arms. Gunners aboard the Ju 52s returned fire while flying at treetop level. Soon after, the first paratroopers were dropped over the area and took heavy fire while descending to the ground. The ground fire took a heavy toll on the German transport aircraft, with only five out of the original 15 Ju 52s making it back to Fornebu, with another two landing at Værnes Airbase near Trondheim, all seven surviving aircraft riddled with bullet holes. The remaining eight transports were shot down or made forced landings. One Ju 52 made an emergency landing on Vänern Lake near Mariestad, Sweden, where it later broke through the ice and sank. The aircraft was salvaged and returned to the Luftwaffe by the Swedish authorities in January 1941. Many of the paratroopers that had been on the shot-down aircraft died in the crashes, or were killed or captured by Norwegian patrols soon after.

Of his originally 185-strong force Oberleutnant Schmidt only managed to gather around him 63 men, the rest having died or been scattered over a vast area. With this straitened force, Schmidt began carrying out the assigned task of blocking the Norwegian rail and road network. The German force blocked the main road in the area and cut the telephone wire running next to it. After capturing a Norwegian taxicab and putting as many of his men as he could in and onto the vehicle, Schmidt drove north toward Dombås, stopping at regular intervals to make forward observations.

==== Schmidt is wounded ====
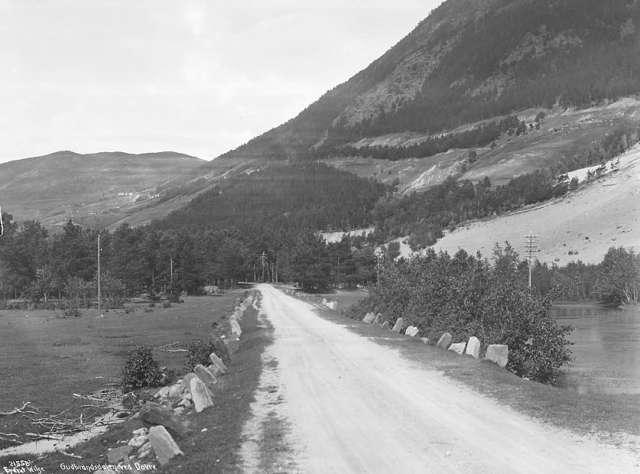
The road near Ulekleiv

When the taxi-borne German force reached the farmstead of Li on the road to Dombås, they ran into two truck-loads of soldiers from No. 5 Company, IR 11. After some initial confusion the Norwegian opened fire and the Germans charged with submachine guns and hand grenades. Following a short fire fight during which Schmidt was severely wounded and the Norwegians pushed back, the paratroopers abandoned their advance on Dombås. They instead pulled back and took up positions in a hedgehog defensive fighting position at the farms of Ulekleiv and Hagevolden, covering all directions and dominating the surrounding landscape. Schmidt—although seriously wounded in the hip and stomach—never relinquished command and ordered his men to use sand to write messages in the snow to the Luftwaffe asking for supplies of provisions and ammunition. The force was not spotted by Luftwaffe reconnaissance aircraft and received no supply drops while at Ulekleiv/Hagevolden.

==== Side-effects of the attack ====
The attack at Dombås made the Norwegian Central Bank speed up the evacuation of the Norwegian gold reserves. The 50 t (55 short tons) of gold had been evacuated from Oslo on 9 April and was being kept in a vault in Lillehammer when the German attack on Dombås began. As soon as news of German paratroopers landing spread, the gold was put on a train and brought to Åndalsnes from where it was evacuated by way of British cruisers and Norwegian fishing boats.

King Haakon VII of Norway and his son, Crown Prince Olav were both at Dovre, near the drop zone and only 30 minutes from the nearest groups of paratroopers when the attack began on 14 April. The King and Crown Prince both had to be escorted out of the area by members of the Dovreskogen Rifle Club.

=== Day two ===
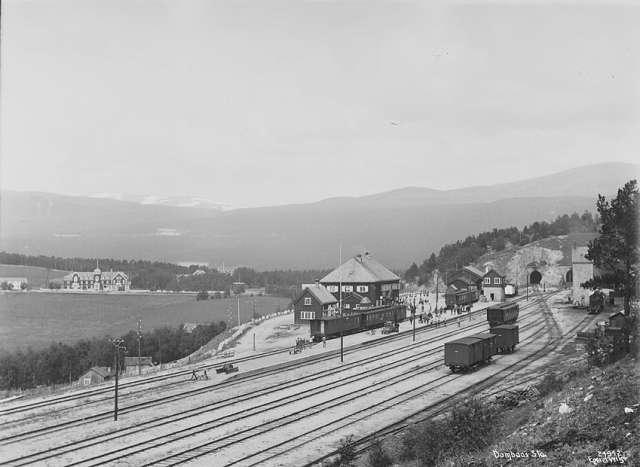
Dombås Station, the primary objective of the German attack

The 15th of April saw the last remaining stragglers rejoining the Fallschirmjäger force at Dombås, from then on no reinforcements reached the 1st Company. During the morning the paratroopers fulfilled part of their mission when they blew up the rail road line in three places. The damage to the line was, however, quickly repaired by Norwegian work crews, and trains passed through the next day.

In the meanwhile Norwegian forces had been assembled and ordered to stop the German advance in the Dombås area. As intelligence on the Fallschirmjägers was very scarce the Norwegian commanders had little idea of the size and location of the German force. During the day a force of two heavy machine gun platoons with 41 men under the command of Kaptein Eiliv Austlid—under orders from government minister Trygve Lie—launched an assault without the benefit of a vanguard on Schmidt's position to secure a route of escape for the Norwegian royal family and the Norwegian cabinet. The assault team—composed of Austlid and six or seven volunteers—stormed across a 200-metre-long (220 yd) field toward the German positions while receiving cover fire from his own heavy machine guns. With only 75 m (82 yd) between them and the Germans, the eight Norwegians had to make their way up the hillside through deep snow. Austlid was only 8–10 m (8.7–10.9 yd) below the first German machine gun nest when he was struck down by a bullet to the chest and the counterattack faltered without its leader. Of the 41 Norwegians caught in the ambush, 28 were captured and five escaped.

=== Day three ===
On 16 April, No. 1 Company, IR 5 under the command of Kaptein Botheim arrived on the scene of battle. No. 1 Company attacked the German strongholds from the south while II/IR 11 attacked with one company from the north. The northern onslaught was supported by two 81 mm (3.19 in) mortars and numerous Colt M/29s.

After a short fire fight, a white flag appeared at the German positions, and one of the Norwegian soldiers captured in the previous day's ambush was sent over to the Norwegian forces. The released prisoner of war brought with him a demand that the Norwegians surrender and told the Norwegian officer in charge that Schmidt threatened to shoot his prisoners unless the fire ceased. This was probably based on a misunderstanding between the Norwegian POW and Oberleutnant Schmidt, the real meaning most likely being that the prisoners held were endangered by the mortar fire that the German positions were subjected to. In response to the surrender demands a German Feldwebel that the Norwegians had captured was despatched back to Schmidt calling for his surrender. The Germans likewise refused to give in.

==== Breakout from Ulekleiv and Hagevolden ====
While the fruitless negotiations were taking place the Fallschirmjägers were preparing to move away from their stronghold and find a new place to fight from. The arrival of the two Norwegian mortars had completely changed the tactical situation and the German force's supply of ammunition was also running dangerously low. Schmidt decided that he had to move his troops into a new and more defensible position. Negotiations were kept up to buy time so the paratroopers could slip away into cover of darkness. Schmidt believed that strong German forces were advancing up the Gudbrandsdal valley and that if he could hold out for a little while longer the situation might still be salvaged. The reality of the situation was, however, that the German advanced units were stuck just north of Minnesund far to the south of both Gudbrandsdal and Dombås.

As negotiations collapsed, the Norwegians opened fire again, but a sudden ground blizzard blinded the gunners and allowed the Germans to make a counterattack and break out of their encirclement. The attack threw back the Norwegian forces in the north, whose commander ordered a general retreat to Dombås. On the night of 16/17 April, the Fallschirmjäger under Schmidt—having thrown back the nearest Norwegian forces—disengaged and began to make their way south in the direction of Dovre.

The 16th of April also saw the continuation of mopping up operations by Norwegian units. Twenty-two Germans were captured at Kolstad near Lesja and another 23 at Bottheim train station. The prisoners were initially held in the basement sitting room of Ulekleiv Hotel in Dombås.

=== Day four ===
Early in the morning on 17 April, the Germans withdrew from their positions, covered by three heavy machine guns captured from the Norwegians in the ambush on 15 April. The paratroopers formed a fighting column with hand grenade armed soldiers at the front followed by the wounded and the POWs on trucks with a rearguard at the end.

At Landheim road bridge, a 25-strong Norwegian force blocked the way, but was quickly thrown back to Dovre Church by a night attack with hand grenades. The German force took up temporary positions at Einbugga road bridge, midway between the village of Toftemo to the north and Dovre to the south.

==== Lindse Farms ====
With daybreak, Schmidt's men began to search out a new position which could provide good cover without the risk of being attacked from the rear. This they found at the North and South Lindse Farm, a farmstead high on a hillside and dominating both the railway line (250 m [270 yd] away) and the main road (700 m [770 yd] away). North Lindse—with its stone barn—became the strong point of the defence, with South Lindse being used to keep Norwegian prisoners; 15 military personnel and 40 civilians. The farm buildings were quickly fortified with sandbags and planking. Oberleutnant Schmidt was carried to Lindse on a door by Norwegian POWs.

==== Renewed fighting ====
On the morning of 17 April, fighting was renewed when first the Norwegian Major Alv Kjøs and then No. 1 Company ran into German ambushes by Lindse. Kjøs was captured, as was the vanguard of No. 1 Company. The main force of No. 1 Company fought its way out, pulling back to Dovre Church at 10:00.

After the first encounter of the day, the main Norwegian forces failed to realise that the whole Fallschirmjäger force had moved to Lindse and spent the day reorganizing and receiving reinforcements. II/IR 11 was replaced by its sister battalion, I/IR 11, and a machine gun platoon from the Norwegian Army Air Service's Jagevingen fighter unit (the unit having lost all its aircraft around Oslo on 9 April) arrived to reinforce the attacks on Schmidt's paratroopers. For most of the day the abandoned German positions at Ulekleiv was bombarded by Norwegian mortars. Only in evening did the Norwegian commanders discover where the Germans had relocated. On the night of 17/18 April, fenrik (Second Lieutenant) L. K. Løkken of the Raufoss Anti-aircraft Command arrived with a 40 mm anti-aircraft gun.

=== Day five ===
The 18th of April turned out to be a decisive day in the battle. The Germans at Lindse were surrounded to the north by the battalion I/IR 11 and to the south by No. 1 Company, IR 5, reinforced by various smaller forces that had arrived the previous day. The company in the south also had the 40 mm AA gun, positioned at Dovre Train Station, as artillery support. Early in the morning Norwegian soldiers made their way into the hills south of Lindse Farm and opened fire. According to Schmidt, this was when the situation became truly dire:

One step out of the nest or the house brought death. We now clung on only to the thought of immediate assistance.

Although the German positions were well fortified their ammunition was running very low and it was soon only a question of time before surrender became the only option left. Help, however, arrived that very morning when a Junkers Ju 52 air dropped ammunition, warm clothing, provisions, medical supplies and the radio frequency for communicating with headquarters.

Later in the day a Norwegian officer approached Schmidt asking for his surrender, but was rejected. The Norwegian 40 mm AA gun kept up a bombardment of Lindse Farms throughout the day, firing 40–50 rounds at positions around the farm buildings and in two nearby ravines. By evening the Germans had all sought shelter in the farm houses as these could not be bombarded directly due to the Norwegian prisoners being held there.

=== The last day ===
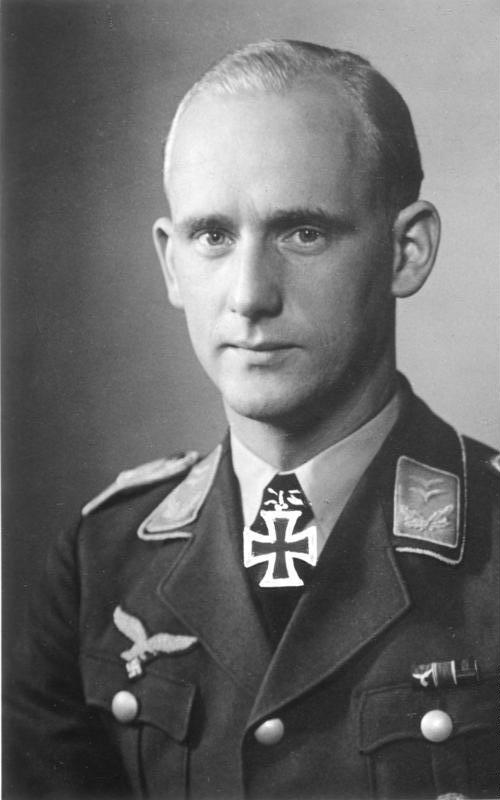
Oberleutnant Herbert Schmidt after receiving his Knight's Cross of the Iron Cross in May 1940

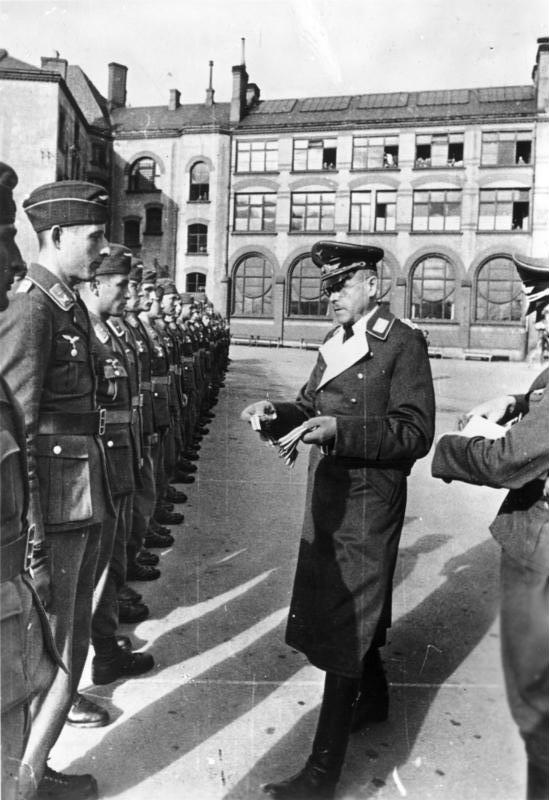
Fallschirmjägers being awarded with the Iron Cross in May 1940 by General Karl Kitzinger

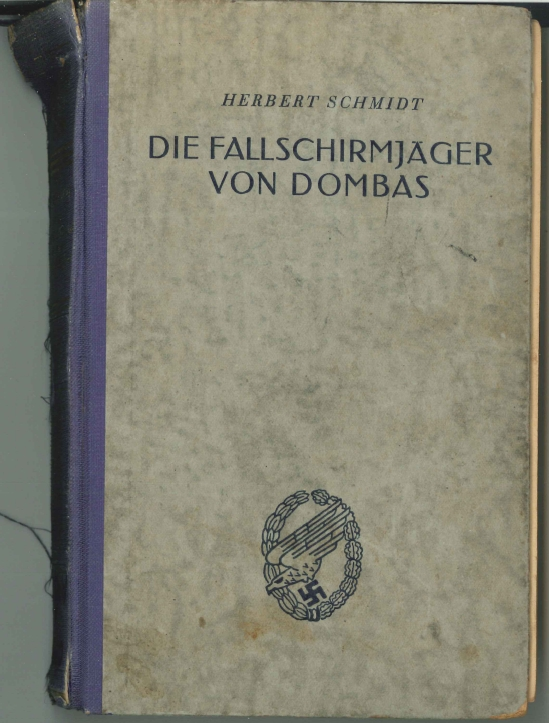
The book by Herbert Schmidt: Die Fallschirmjäger von Dombas, Berlin 1941

By dawn on 19 April, the Germans were completely surrounded by better-armed Norwegian troops. During the night, a final reinforcement had reached the Norwegians; a rail-mounted howitzer manned by a gun crew of Royal Marines that had arrived from Åndalsnes. The howitzer had 300 rounds available and opened fire at 06:00, firing ten rounds with good accuracy. Soon after another Ju 52 transport arrived carrying supplies to the beleaguered Germans but turned around without making its drop after receiving a radio message from Schmidt informing that the paratroopers were going to surrender.

Later on. Schmidt sent out his second-in-command—Leutnant Ernst Mössinger—to negotiate a surrender, hoping to reach favourable terms. Major Arne Sunde, the Norwegian commander, however, refused to accept anything but an unconditional surrender. Sunde told Mössinger that unless the Germans announced their surrender within 10 minutes by launching three flares the British and Norwegian artillery would recommence bombarding Lindse Farm. Nine and a half minutes later, at 11:30, the Fallschirmjäger force at Lindse fired three signal flares.

Forty-five Fallschirmjäger surrendered at Lindse Farms, six of whom were wounded. After having been fed at the municipal building in Dovre, the captured Germans were sent by train to Dombås.

== Aftermath ==
The Germans lost a total of 21 dead during the battle, as well as 40 wounded or injured. Of these, 15 of the fatalities occurred during the initial phase of the attack, as well as 20 wounded and 14 personnel suffering injuries. Six more were killed and another six wounded during the fighting that led to the final German surrender on 19 April. Around 150 Germans were taken as prisoners of war. Seven Junkers Ju 52 transports were shot by ground-fire and an eighth Ju 52 landed in neutral Sweden. Norwegian casualties in the battle totaled 20 dead and 20 wounded. The Norwegian and German wounded who were treated by the Norwegian medical service were first treated at a field hospital in Dombås, before being moved to a regular hospital. The first train loads of wounded, leaving Dombås on 16 April, were destined for Molde Hospital in Molde, with later transports sent with the hospital ship Brand IV from Åndalsnes to Ålesund Hospital in Ålesund. German dead were buried by the Norwegian military in mass graves, eventually being moved post-war to a German War Graves Commission cemetery in Alfaset, Oslo.

Following their surrender, the captured German soldiers were sent to rear areas in the Romsdal region, the severely wounded to the hospital in Ålesund and the remainder (135 soldiers) to a school in Kristiansund. During German bombing raids on Kristiansund on 28–29 April, the prisoners of war suffered several wounded. Following the bombing of Kristiansund, the prisoners were moved by lighters to Averøya near Kristiansund, where they were initially kept in a school until a proper a prisoner-of-war camp had been built at Bruhagen. Initially the prisoners had been sent to a transit prisoner-of-war-camp at Isfjorden near Åndalsnes, but this camp did not have the capacity to house the numbers captured at Dombås.

The intention of Norwegian authorities was to first keep the prisoners for interrogation and then ship them to the United Kingdom, but in the chaos of the collapse of resistance in the southern parts of Norway and the Allies' evacuation from Åndalsnes in late April/early May the German POWs were left behind to be freed by elements of the Luftwaffe's General Göring Regiment. Of the captured Fallschirmjägers only three fell into British hands and were brought to the United Kingdom when the British evacuated from the southern parts of Norway. One of the three had been able to evade capture after the jump over Dombås until he was caught by retreating British and Norwegian forces in Dombås proper on 29 April.

Thirteen paratroopers had been taken prisoner near Lillehammer on 14 April after their Ju 52 had been shot down en route to the target. Three of the Germans on board were wounded and were sent to Lillehammer Hospital. The unwounded prisoners were eventually transferred to Lom prisoner of war camp in Lom Municipality in Oppland. The pilot of the downed Ju 52 had committed suicide when Norwegian troops approached.

In the aftermath of the German attack on Dombås, efforts were made by Norwegian military authorities to prevent further Fallschirmjäger landings by organizing volunteers into anti-paratroop ski patrols. By 23 April 415 volunteers from 13 local rifle clubs were carrying out regular patrols of the mountains of Østerdalen. Of the volunteers, 100 had military uniforms, the rest only armbands. Second-line regular troops were also employed to guard against new German paratroop attacks. The weapons captured from the Germans at Dombås were not distributed to Norwegian troops, but rather stored at the village of Tretten, where they were recaptured by the Germans on 23 April.

Most of the freed paratroopers soon after volunteered to jump into the isolated Narvik front in North Norway to help the hard pressed Gebirgsjägers of the German 3rd Mountain Division fighting under the command of Generalleutnant Eduard Dietl from 16 May. Many of the survivors from Dombås died fighting under the leadership of Leutnant Mössinger at Narvik.

Herbert Schmidt—the leader of the Fallschirmjäger force at Dombås—received the Knight's Cross of the Iron Cross on 24 May 1940, for his efforts during the battle. He later recovered from the wounds he had suffered, and in 1941 wrote a book detailing his experiences during the battle called Die Fallschirmjäger von Dombaas. Schmidt was killed by the French Resistance in 1944.

== See also ==
- List of German military equipment of World War II
- List of Norwegian military equipment of World War II

== Literature ==
- Årflot, Odd (1985). Soldat, april 1940 (in Norwegian). Oslo: Samlaget. ISBN 8252126472.
- Arneberg, Sven T. (1989). Vi dro mot nord: felttoget i Norge i april 1940, skildret av tyske soldater og offiserer: (Oslo, Østfold, Akershus, Hedmark, Oppland, Møre og Romsdal) (in Norwegian). Aventura. ISBN 8258806149.
- Den krighistoriske avdeling (1953). Krigen i Norge 1940. [3] : Operasjonene i Glåmadalføret, Trysil og Rendalen (in Norwegian). Oslo: Gyldendal.
- Flatmark, Jan Olav (1988). Ålesund i hverdag og krig: små og store hendelser fra de underlige åra 1940–1945. 1: Ålesund under okkupasjonen 1940–1945 (in Norwegian). Ålesund: Nordvest forlag. ISBN 8290330448.
- Hafsten, Bjørn; Larsstuvold, Ulf; Olsen, Bjørn and Stenersen, Sten (1991). Flyalarm – luftkrigen over Norge 1939–1945 (in Norwegian) (1st ed.). Oslo: Sem og Stenersen. ISBN 82-7046-058-3.
- Hauge, Andreas (1995). Kampene i Norge 1940 (in Norwegian). Vol. 1. Sandefjord: Krigshistorisk Forlag. ISBN 82-993369-0-2.
- Hauge, Andreas (1995). Kampene i Norge 1940 (in Norwegian). Vol. 2. Sandefjord: Krigshistorisk Forlag. ISBN 82-993369-0-2.
- Høgevold, John (1984). Vår militære innsats hjemme og ute 1940–45 (in Norwegian). Oslo: Norwegian High Command. ISBN 82-991210-0-0.
- Mølmen, Øystein (1996). Krigen 1940–45 (in Norwegian). Lesjaskog: Ø. Mølmen. ISBN 82-993958-0-1.
- Mølmen, Øystein (1998). Raumabanen/Romsdalen, Lesja og Dovre: kamphandlingene i april 1940 (in Norwegian). Raumabanens kulturlag. ISBN 82-994722-0-2.
- Quarrie, Bruce (2007) [1983]. German Airborne Troops 1939–45. Oxford: Osprey Publishing. ISBN 978-0-85045-480-2.
- Voksø, Per; John Berg (1994). Krigens dagbok – Norge 1940–1945 (in Norwegian). Oslo: Forlaget Det Beste. ISBN 82-7010-166-4.
- Zeiner-Gundersen, Herman Fredrik (1986). Norsk artilleri gjennom 300 år (in Norwegian). Arendal: Agdin Forlag. ISBN 82-7360-003-3.
