= Ole Fingalf Harbek =

Norwegian jurist and politician

Ole Fingalf Harbek (26 July 1887 – 1 March 1974) was a Norwegian jurist and politician. He was born in Larvik. He served as district stipendiary magistrate in Nedre Romerike from 1936, and in Horten from 1950. In 1940 he was a member of the Administrative Council and led the Ministry of Justice.

He was decorated Commander of the Royal Norwegian Order of St. Olav in 1963.
