= Rasmus Mork =

Norwegian economist and administrator (1896–1974)

- Born: 19 January 1896; Ørsta, Norway
- Died: 23 May 1974 (aged 78)
- Occupations: Economist; Administrator
- Awards: Order of St. Olav

Rasmus Johannes Mork (19 January 1896 – 23 May 1974) was a Norwegian economist and administrator.

He earned the cand.oecon. degree in 1920, lectured at Norges landbrukshøgskole from 1921, was appointed professor of dairy economics from 1945 to 1962, and served as rector from 1946 to 1953. He was a member of the Administrative Council in 1940, serving as head of the Ministry of Agriculture and Food. He was decorated Commander of the Order of St. Olav in 1951. He died in 1974.
