= Schei Committee =

Norwegian government body (fl. 1946–1962)

The Schei Committee (Norwegian: Schei-komitéen) was a committee named by the Government of Norway to look into the organization of municipalities in Norway post-World War II.

It convened in 1946, and its formal name was Kommuneinndelingskomiteen av 1946 (The 1946 Committee on Municipal Division). Its more commonly used name derives from the committee leader, Nikolai Schei, who was County Governor of Sogn og Fjordane at the time.

The committee concluded its work in 1962. By that time, it had published an eighteen-volume work called Kommuneinndelingskomitéens endelige tilråding om kommunedelingen.

The findings of the committee were highly influential; it spurred a series of mergers of municipalities, especially during the 1960s, reducing the number of municipalities in Norway from 747 to 454. The number has since been reduced further, but not as rapidly as before.
