= Erling Mossige =

Norwegian jurist and banker

Erling Mossige (16 April 1907 – 3 January 1997) was a Norwegian jurist and banker.

He was born in Målselv Municipality in Troms county, Norway. He was a son of district physician Rasmus Mossige (1865–1954) and Aagot Koller. In 1936 he married Hanne Margrethe Rode. He studied from 1924 and graduated from the Royal Frederick University (now University of Oslo) with a cand.jur. degree in 1928. He was a deputy judge from 1929 to 1933, and was hired as a secretary in the Ministry of Social Affairs in 1933 and head of office in the Ministry of Provisioning and Reconstruction in 1939. After the Occupation of Norway by Nazi Germany, he fled to London where he was a head of department in the Norwegian Shipping and Trade Mission (Nortraship) from 1940 to 1945. He was decorated with the Defence Medal 1940–1945 and the King's Medal for Courage.

He was an executive in Nortraship after the war, before becoming deputy manager (soussjef) at Christiania Bank og Kreditkasse in 1948, and Den norske Creditbank in 1957. He was the director of Den norske Creditbank from 1958. He chaired Norsk Spisevognselskap from 1948 to 1960, and was a board member of Norsk Skibs Hypotekbank 1960-70, several foreign banks, the Norwegian-American Chamber of Commerce and the skiing club Christinia SK. He was a supervisory council member in Brage-Fram and Borgestad, and a member of Norges Eksportråd.

He died in January 1997 and was buried at Vår Frelsers gravlund.
