= Forsikringsselskapet Norge =

Norwegian insurance company

Forsikringsselskapet Norge ("Insurance Company Norway") was a general insurance company based in Drammen, Norway.

== History ==
It was founded as Brandforsikringsselskabet Norge on 9 May 1857 as a fire insurance company. The founder and first chief executive was H. F. Bang. In 1888 he was succeeded by Alb. Mohn. From 1899 to 1919 Aage Lammers was the chief executive, and from 1919 Johs. Thv. Thomassen. Nils J. Hagerup later took over. In 1988, the company was acquired by Forenede-Gruppen (Forenede Forsikring). In 1993, Forenede Forsikring was merged with Gjensidige Forsikring ASA.
