= Ministry of Shipping (Norway) =

Former government ministry of Norway

The Royal Norwegian Ministry of Shipping (Norwegian: Skipsfartsdepartementet) was a Norwegian ministry that existed from 1942 to 1945.

It was established on 1 October 1942, during the second World War. Nortraship had been operating since 1940. The Ministry of Shipping ceased to exist on 5 November 1945. Its tasks were mainly transferred to the Ministry of Trade.

The heads of the Ministry of Shipping were Arne Sunde (1942-1945) and Tor Skjønsberg (1945). Also, Sven Nielsen was acting minister in 1945.

An unrelated Ministry of Trade and Shipping was formed in 1947.
