= First Gerhardsen cabinet =

Government of Norway from June to November 1945

Gerhardsen's First Cabinet Unification Cabinet
- Cabinet of Norway

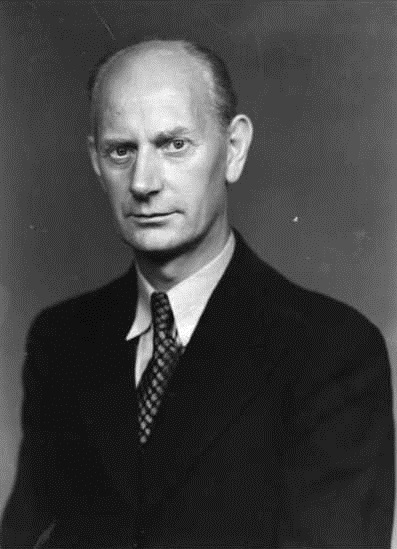
- Date formed: 25 June 1945
- Date dissolved: 5 November 1945

People and organisations
- King: Haakon VII of Norway
- Prime Minister: Einar Gerhardsen
- No. of ministers: 15
- Member parties: Labour Party; Liberal Party; Conservative Party; Communist Party; Resistance movement
- Status in legislature: Majority

History
- Outgoing formation: 1945 parliamentary election
- Legislature term: 1945-1949
- Predecessor: Nygaardsvold's Cabinet
- Successor: Gerhardsen's Second Cabinet

Gerhardsen's First Cabinet, often called the Unification Cabinet (Norwegian: Samlingsregjeringen), was a Norwegian government appointed to serve under Prime Minister Einar Gerhardsen between 25 June and 5 November 1945, in the aftermath of the Second World War.

The preceding Nygaardsvold's Cabinet had been appointed nine years earlier, but in 1940, just before scheduled elections, Norway was invaded by Germany, and the government had to flee to London. When the war was over, Nygaardsvold's Cabinet abdicated after returning to Norway, and a panpolitical, coalition government was appointed by King Haakon VII to sit until an election for the Parliament of Norway could be held.

The cabinet is noteworthy in Norwegian political history for being the first one to include a woman, Kirsten Hansteen, who was Consultative Councillor of State in the Ministry of Social Affairs, the only one ever to have members from the Communist Party of Norway (one of whom was Hansteen), and the only time the Labour Party sat in a coalition government before Stoltenberg's Second Cabinet was appointed in 2005.

== Cabinet ==
The cabinet had the following members:

Portfolio	Minister	Period	Party
Prime Minister	Einar Gerhardsen	25 June – 5 November 1945	Labour
Minister of Foreign Affairs	Trygve Lie	25 June – 5 November 1945	Labour
Minister of Defence	Oscar Torp	25 June – 5 November 1945	Labour
Minister of Finance	Gunnar Jahn	25 June – 5 November 1945	Resistance
Minister of Justice and the Police	Johan Cappelen	25 June – 5 November 1945	Conservative
Minister of Church Affairs and Education	Kaare Fostervoll	25 June – 5 November 1945	Labour
Consultative Councillor of State for Church Affairs	Conrad Bonnevie-Svendsen	25 June – 5 November 1945	Resistance
Minister of Agriculture	Einar Frogner	25 June – 5 November 1945	Agrarian
Minister of Trade	Lars Evensen	25 June – 5 November 1945	Labour
Minister of Provisioning and Reconstruction	Egil Offenberg	25 June – 5 November 1945	Conservative
Consultative Councillor of State for Finnmark Affairs	Hans Gabrielsen	25 June – 5 November 1945	Liberal
Minister of Shipping	Tor Skjønsberg	25 June – 5 November 1945	Resistance
Minister of Labour	Johan Strand Johansen	25 June – 5 November 1945	Communist
Minister of Social Affairs	Sven Oftedal	25 June – 5 November 1945	Labour
Consultative Councillor of State for Social Affairs	Kirsten Hansteen	25 June – 5 November 1945	Communist

Preceded by Nygaardsvold's Cabinet	Norwegian Council of State; 1945	Succeeded by Gerhardsen's Second Cabinet
