= Jens Bache-Wiig =

Industrialist and professor (1880–1965)

Jens Bache-Wiig (15 November 1880 – 6 May 1965) was a Norwegian engineer and industrialist.

== Early life and education ==
He was born at Bøn, Eidsvoll to factory owner Hartwig Bache-Wiig (1850–1922) and his wife Amalie Kristine Holt (1851–1940). His father and his brother Carl operated the cellulose factory Bøhnsdalen Mills until 1889, when the family moved to Kristiania.

At some point after the 1899 Kristiania housing bubble burst, Bache-Wig moved to Germany to study engineering. He first attended the West Saxon University of Applied Sciences of Zwickau, and then the Karlsruhe Institute of Technology, where he took his final exam in 1902.

== Career ==
In 1906, Bache-Wiig was employed by the Westinghouse Electric Company in Pittsburgh, United States. After that, he was appointed professor in electrical engineering at the newly established Norwegian Institute of Technology, where he stayed until 1916. In 1912–13, he published papers on the calculation of electrical machines with AC and DC generators. In 1916, he became managing director of Elektrisk Bureau, a manufacturer of telecommunication equipment. He left Elektrisk Bureau for Standard Electric – a subsidiary of the International Telephone and Telegraph (ITT) – in 1926. In 1931, he was appointed director-general of ITT's Germany division, and received also the responsibility for the ITT's operations in Eastern Europe. Four years later, he resigned from the position, in protest against the New York head office intervening in his area of responsibility.

During the Quisling regime of German-occupied Norway, Bache-Wiig served in the non-political Administrative Council until September 1940, when it was replaced by the Reichskommissariat Norwegen headed by the Norwegian Nazi Terboven. In this Council, he was the Head of the Ministry of Trade and the Ministry of Provisioning. In 1944, he succeeded Axel Aubert as managing director of Norsk Hydro.

== Marriages and death ==
Bache-Wiig married Tordis Nicolaysen (1885–1934) on 8 December 1906; this marriage ended in divorce. He married Hjørdis Tidemand-Johannessen (1891–??) on 20 June 1939.

He died in Bærum on 6 May 1965, and then was buried at Vår Frelsers gravlund.
