= Egil Offenberg =

Norwegian businessperson and politician

Egil Offenberg (8 March 1899 – 28 July 1975) was a Norwegian businessperson and politician for the Conservative party.

He was the chief executive officer at the Schou Brewery from 1932 to 1967. He was active in the Norwegian resistance movement and became part of its leadership in 1942. He was made Minister of Supplies and Reconstruction in Einar Gerhardsen's unity government in 1945 and served as president of Federation of Norwegian Industries.

Business positions
Preceded by Eilif Bang	President of the Federation of Norwegian Industries; 1950–1953	Succeeded by Hans Theodor Kiær
