= 2nd Division (Norway) =

World War II Norwegian Army formation

The Norwegian 2nd Division (Norwegian: 2. divisjon) was responsible for defending Eastern Norway against Nazi Germany during the early part of the Norwegian campaign of the Second World War. The division was commanded by General Jacob Hvinden Haug.

== Overview ==
The term "division" in the Norwegian Army in 1940 did not mean the same as a division in British terms (a tactical formation consisting of two or more manoeuvre (infantry or armour) brigades with command and staff units and supporting troops). The only Norwegian division living up to this in 1940 was the 6th Division at Narvik fielding two brigades (6 and 7 Brigades).

In 1940, the Norwegian Army used the term "division" to signify a geographical area of military responsibility. In pre-war planning, each division was supposed to field one brigade and one or more local defence battalions (landvernbataljoner).

In 1940, the 2nd division was able to mobilise a significant number of men to confront the German advance. However, the majority of the troops were poorly equipped even before the loss of critical equipment during the 9 April German invasion. The Norwegian Army of 1940 was basically equipped to First World War standards. There were no tanks, no modern artillery, no anti-tank weapons and no effective anti-aircraft guns. With the exception of a number of Colt M/29 heavy machine guns and light Madsen machine guns, the soldiers had to rely on the 1894 vintage Krag–Jørgensen rifle. In addition to this, the average soldier was poorly trained, many having only received 48 days of basic training, although there also were soldiers with longer service (guardsmen, soldiers who had been mobilised at the outbreak of the war between Nazi Germany and the United Kingdom, and some who had served as volunteers in the Finno-Soviet Winter War).

Adding to these already formidable problems came the fact that the geographical area the division had to cover was too large to make a proper concentration possible, and consequently the campaign tended to be a number of battalion sized actions fought over a large area.

== German invasion ==
The 2nd Division suffered great losses of materiel when the Germans captured several of the division's depots and stores in the first 24 hours of the invasion, but in spite of this the division was able to mobilise the following formations:

- 4th Infantry regiment (two battalions)
- 5th Infantry regiment (one line battalion, one local defence battalion)
- 6th Infantry regiment (two line battalions, one local defence battalion)
- 2nd Dragoons regiment (five squadrons - dismounted)
- Engineers regiment (three pioneer companies, two signals companies)
- One improvised artillery regiment (named Hegstad after the CO)
- Two improvised infantry battalions (Thorkildsen and Larsen)

The division was later reinforced by 11th Infantry Regiment's two line battalions in Gudbrandsdalen, but at that time most of the original units had been worn out and did not exist as fighting formations.

Due to the critical situation in Eastern Norway the field brigade of the 4th Division was transferred to Valdres (in the 2nd Division area of responsibility) and was soon heavily engaged against the Germans in Bagn and at Tonsåsen.

By the middle of April, the Germans started to advance out of Oslo to break the somewhat over-ambitiously named "iron ring" around the capital.

General Hvinden Haug has been criticised by historians for without a fight abandoning prepared and supposedly easily defensible positions along the river Nitelva at Lillestrøm thereby giving up the mustering places and remaining stores of the Norwegian Army at Gardermoen.

Norwegian troops managed to halt the Germans temporarily in Hakadalen, at Bjørgeseter and at Strandlykkja by Lake Mjøsa blocking two out of three main routes out of Oslo going north. However this proved futile as German tanks and Junkers Ju 87 "Stuka" dive-bombers, against which the Norwegian forces had no effective defence, routed the Norwegians at the third exit at Klekken near the city of Hønefoss. This made the Norwegian position untenable and initiated a general retreat from the previously successfully held positions.

The Norwegians were pushed back northwards, desperately trying to slow the German advance, and waiting for allied reinforcements. The first British units arrived at Lillehammer around 21 April, but this proved too late, for on the same day the Germans decisively defeated the Norwegians at the battles of Lundehøgda and Bråstad and achieved a breakthrough to the Gudbrandsdalen, the heartland of Eastern Norway.

For the rest of the campaign in Gudbrandsdalen, the brunt of the fighting had to be borne by British units, even though Norwegian units continued to contribute for the rest of the campaign.

Following the allied evacuation of Southern Norway, General Hvinden Haug surrendered the remnants of his division at Åndalsnes on 3 May 1940.
