= Tor Skjønsberg =

Norwegian resistance member (1903–1993)

Tor Vangen Skjønsberg (27 April 1903–8 September 1993) was a Norwegian resistance leader, by education he was a lawyer.

In 1941 Tor Skjønsberg called for a meeting "Grimelundsmøtet" which is considered the start of organized resistance in Norway.

Skjønsberg was the de facto leader of the resistance movement in Norway until he had to flee the country in November 1944. After Skjønsberg fled, Jens Christian Hauge became the leader of the resistance movement.

After the liberation, Skjønsberg served as Minister of Shipping from 22 June to 1 November 1945, in the interim government of Einar Gerhardsen.
