= Jacob Hvinden Haug =

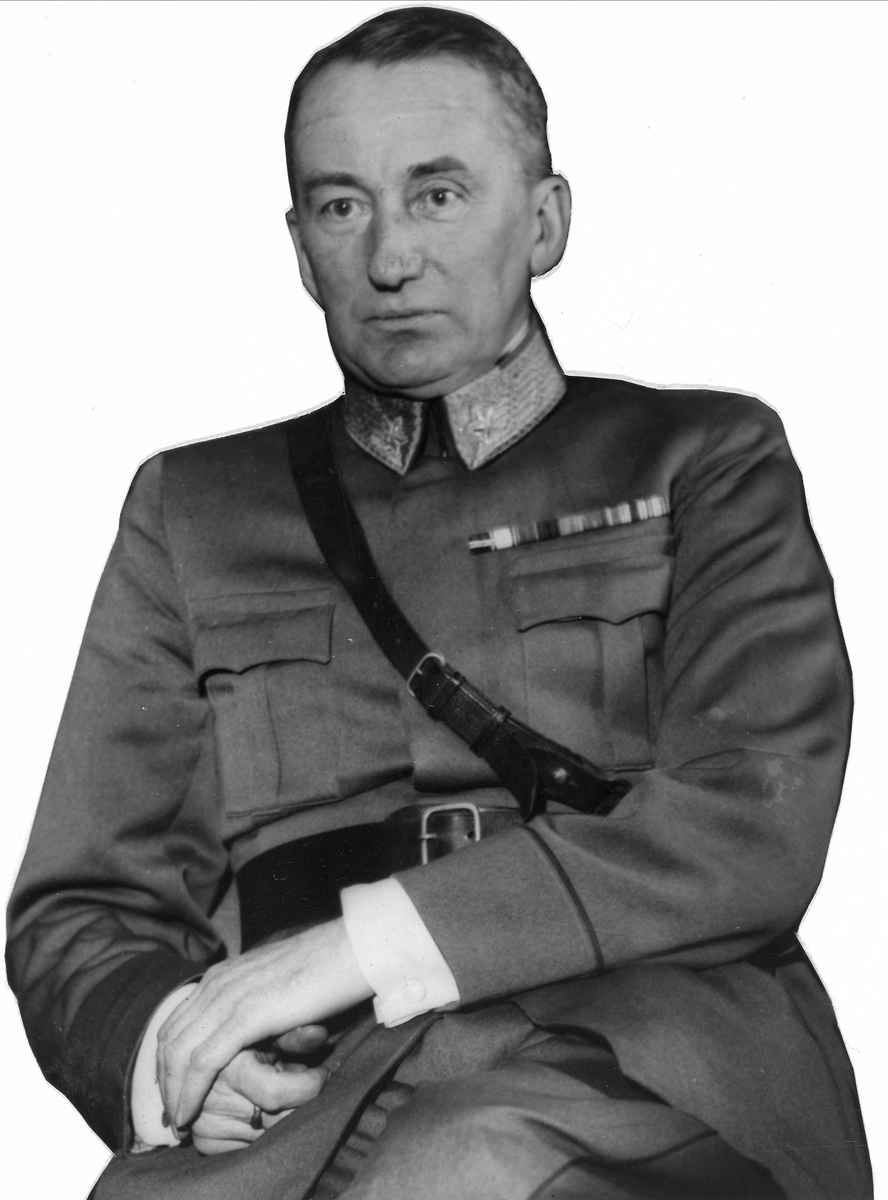
- Jacob Hvinden Haug in 1935
- Born: January 14, 1880; Christiania, Norway
- Died: June 2, 1961 (aged 81) Oslo, Norway
- Buried: Vestre gravlund
- Allegiance: Norway
- Branch: Norwegian Army
- Rank: Major General
- Commands: 2nd Division
- Conflicts: World War II; Norwegian Campaign
- Other work: Grand Master of the Norwegian Order of Freemasons

Jacob Hvinden Haug (14 January 1880 – 2 June 1961) was a Norwegian military officer and grand master of the Norwegian Order of Freemasons.

He was born in Christiania. He was major general and commander of the Norwegian 2nd Division from 1936. During the Norwegian Campaign in the Second World War he was head of the operations at Mjøsa and in Gudbrandsdalen.
