= Administrative Council (Norway) =

Cabinet in the government of Norway

The Administrative Council (Norwegian: Administrasjonsrådet) was a council established by the Supreme Court to govern Norway. The council of seven people was established on 15 April 1940, replacing Quisling's First Cabinet, and was led by Ingolf Elster Christensen. It was replaced on 25 September by another council by Josef Terboven, referred to in Norwegian as Josef Terboven's kommissariske statsråder.

Member	Portfolio
Ingolf Elster Christensen	Chair and responsible for issues related to the Ministry of Foreign Affairs, the Ministry of Defence (limited to non-political and non-military matters), and from 4 June the Ministry of Labour.
Andreas Diesen	Ministry of Social Affairs
Gunnar Jahn	Ministry of Finance and Customs and until 4 June Ministry of Labour
Didrik Arup Seip	Ministry of Education and Research
Ole F. Harbek	Ministry of Justice
Jens Bache-Wiig	Ministry of Trade and Industry and Ministry of Supplies
Rasmus Mork	Ministry of Agriculture

== See also ==
- Reichskommissariat Norwegen
