= Norwegian Industrial Bank =

The Norwegian Industrial Bank (Norwegian: Den Norske Industribank), also known as the Industry Bank, was a Norwegian bank.

It had a nationwide mandate as an industrial development bank. It was created in 1936, amid the interwar economic crisis, to supply loans to industry and hotels. The Norwegian state owned about half of the shares. In 1977 it incorporated the loan institution Strukturfinans. In 1993 it merged with the Industry Fund and the Regional Development Fund to form the Norwegian Industrial and Regional Development Fund, now a part of Innovation Norway.
