= Bøn =

- Village
- Location in Akershus
- Coordinates: 60°17′29″N 11°11′55″E
- Country: Norway
- Region: Østlandet
- County: Akershus
- Municipality: Eidsvoll
- Time zone: UTC+01:00 (CET)
  - Summer (DST): UTC+02:00 (CEST)

Bøn is a village in Eidsvoll, Akershus, Norway. It is approximately 49 km away from Oslo, and approximately 12 km away from Oslo Airport.
