= Bjørn Christophersen =

Norwegian military officer and historian

Bjørn Christophersen (31 December 1900 – 27 June 1985) was a Norwegian military officer and historian.

== Biography ==
Christophersen was born at Skedsmo in Akershus, Norway. He was the son of Olaf Christopher Christophersen (1868–1937) and Mathilde Christiane Dahl Rodtwitt (1875–1965). His father served as mayor of Skedsmo and senior prosecutor in Lillestrøm. Christophersen completed the War School and attended the Norwegian Military Academy from 1921 to 1923. From 1937 he served as head of office in the General Staff.

At the time of the German invasion of Norway in 1940, Christophersen was captured but was released later that same year. He arrived in Great Britain in the fall of 1941. In February 1942, Christophersen was appointed Colonel and Chief of Staff of the Norwegian Armed Forces in London under Defense Chief Wilhelm von Tangen Hansteen.

After the liberation of Norway, he became Secretary General of the Defense Commission of 1946. He was Director of the War School from 1949. He headed the Norwegian Army Command Germany from 1952 to 1953. He was promoted to Lieutenant general in 1956, and served as head of the Norwegian Army from 1956 to 1961. He was decorated Commander with star of the Order of St. Olav in 1958, the Grand Cross of the Order of the Lion of Finland and of the Order of the Sword. Following his death during 1985, he was buried at Vestre gravlund in Oslo.

== Selected works ==
- Forsvarets gamle underoffisersstand. Dens innsats på sivile felter (Oslo: Gyldendal, 1978) ISBN 82-05-11151-0
- Vårt forsvars historie. En oversikt frem til 1940 (Oslo: Gyldendal, 1978) ISBN 82-05-10419-0

== Other sources ==
- Charles D. Pettibone (2014) The Organization and Order of Battle of Militaries In World War II (Trafford Publishing) ISBN 9781490733869
