= Norwegian campaign =

Second World War campaign fought in Norway

- Part of European theatre of World War II
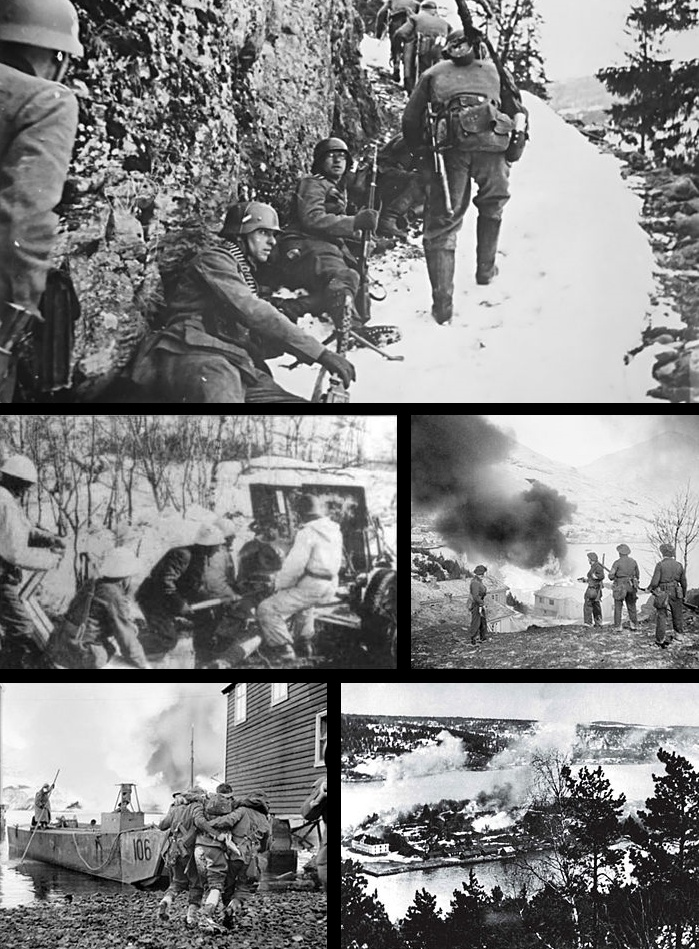
- The Battle of Narvik saw Norway's toughest fight in World War II; nearly 7,500 Norwegian soldiers participated in the battle, along with British, French and Polish troops. The reconquest of Narvik was the first time the forces of the Third Reich were removed from a captured city.
Date	8 April – 10 June 1940 (2 months and 2 days)
Location	Norway
Result	German victory
Territorial changes	Nazi Germany occupies Norway: Formation of the Reichskommissariat Norwegen

Belligerents
Germany	Norway; United Kingdom; France; Poland

Commanders and leaders
Nikolaus von Falkenhorst	Kristian Laake (9–10 April); Otto Ruge (from 10 April); William Boyle; Sylvestre Gérard Audet (from 15 April)

Strength
100,000; 7 divisions 1 Fallschirmjäger battalion	Norway: 55,000; 6 divisions Allies: 38,000; Total: 90,000

Casualties and losses
Official German figures: 5,296 (1,317 killed on land 2,375 lost at sea 1,604 wounded); Material losses: 1 heavy cruiser 2 light cruisers 10 destroyers 6 U-boats; 2 torpedo boats 15 light naval units 21 transports/merchant ships 90–240 aircraft	Total: 6,602; British: On land: 1,869 killed, wounded, injured & missing At sea: 2,500 lost 1 aircraft carrier 1 heavy cruiser 1 light cruiser 7 destroyers 1 submarine 112 aircraft French and Polish: 533 killed, wounded & missing 2 destroyers 2 submarines Norwegian: 1,700 total, of whom 860 were killed 107 naval ships sunk or captured 70 merchant ships & transports sunk (combined Norwegian/Allied total)
- Civilian (Norwegian) casualties: 535 killed

The Norwegian campaign (8 April – 10 June 1940) involved the attempt by Allied forces to defend northern Norway coupled with the Norwegian military's resistance to the country's invasion by Nazi Germany in World War II.

Planned as Operation Wilfred and Plan R 4, while the German attack was feared but had not yet happened, the battlecruiser HMS Renown set out from Scapa Flow for Vestfjorden with twelve destroyers on 4 April. The Royal Navy and the Kriegsmarine met at the first and second naval battles of Narvik on 10 and 13 April, and British forces conducted the Åndalsnes landings on 13 April. The main strategic reason for Germany to invade Norway was to seize the port of Narvik and guarantee the delivery of iron ore needed for German steel production.

The campaign was fought until 10 June 1940 and saw the escape of King Haakon VII and Crown Prince Olav to the United Kingdom. A British, French and Polish expeditionary force of 38,000 troops landed in the north. It had moderate success but made a rapid strategic retreat after the Battle of France began in May. The Norwegian government then went into exile in London. The campaign ended with the occupation of the entirety of Norway by Germany but elements of the Norwegian military escaped and fought on overseas.

== Background ==
=== Outbreak of World War II ===
Britain and France had signed military assistance treaties with Poland and two days after the German Invasion of Poland on 1 September 1939, both declared war on Nazi Germany. However, neither country mounted significant offensive operations and for several months there were no major engagements, and this period became known as the Phoney War or "Twilight War". Winston Churchill in particular wished to escalate the war into a more active phase, in contrast to Prime Minister Neville Chamberlain.

During this time both sides wished to open secondary fronts. For the Allies, in particular the French, this was based on a desire to avoid repeating the trench warfare of the First World War, which had occurred on the Franco-German border.

Following the outbreak of the Second World War, the Norwegian government had mobilized parts of the Norwegian Army and all but two of the Royal Norwegian Navy's warships. The Norwegian Army Air Service and the Royal Norwegian Navy Air Service were also called up to protect Norwegian neutrality from violations by the warring countries. The first such violations were the sinkings in Norwegian territorial waters of several British ships by German U-boats. In the following months, aircraft from all the belligerents violated Norwegian neutrality.

And almost immediately after the outbreak of war, the British began pressuring the Norwegian government to provide them with the services of the Norwegian merchant navy, being in dire need of shipping to oppose the strength of Nazi forces. Following protracted negotiations between 25 September and 20 November 1939, the Norwegians agreed to charter 150 tankers, as well as other ships with a tonnage of 450,000 gross tons. The Norwegian government's concern for the country's supply lines played an important role in persuading them to accept the agreement.

=== The value of Norway ===
Norway, although neutral, was considered strategically important for both sides for several reasons. First was the importance of iron ore from Sweden – upon which Germany depended – exported through the Norwegian port of Narvik. This route was especially important in the winter months when much of the Baltic Sea was frozen over. Narvik became of greater significance to the British when it became apparent that Operation Catherine, a plan to gain control of the Baltic Sea, would not be realized. Großadmiral Erich Raeder had pointed out several times in 1939 the danger to Germany of Britain seizing the initiative and launching its own invasion in Scandinavia, for if the powerful Royal Navy had bases at Bergen, Narvik and Trondheim, the North Sea would be virtually closed to Germany, and the Kriegsmarine would be at risk even in the Baltic.

Controlling Norway would also be a strategic asset in the Battle of the Atlantic. The capture of ports would create gaps in the blockade of Germany, giving access to the Atlantic Ocean. These ports would allow Germany to use its sea power effectively against the Allies. Control of Norwegian air bases would allow German reconnaissance aircraft to operate far into the North Atlantic, while German U-boats and surface ships operating out of Norwegian naval bases would be able to break the British blockade line across the North Sea and attack convoys heading to Great Britain.

=== Winter War ===
When the Soviet Union launched its attack against Finland on 30 November 1939, the Allies found themselves aligned with Norway and Sweden in support of Finland against the much larger aggressor.

After the outbreak of the Winter War between Finland and the Soviet Union, Norway mobilized larger land forces than had initially been considered necessary. By early 1940 their 6th Division in Finnmark and Troms fielded 9,500 troops to defend against a potential Soviet attack, positioned mostly in the eastern regions of Finnmark. Parts of the 6th Division's forces remained in Finnmark even after the German invasion, guarding against the danger. During the Winter War, the Norwegian authorities secretly broke the country's own neutrality by sending the Finns a shipment of 12 Ehrhardt 7.5 cm Model 1901 artillery pieces and 12,000 shells, as well as allowing the British to use Norwegian territory to transfer aircraft and other weaponry to Finland.

This presented an opportunity to the Allies; offering them the potential to use the invasion to also send troop support to occupy ore fields in Sweden and ports in Norway. The plan, promoted by the British General Edmund Ironside, included two divisions landing at Narvik, five battalions somewhere in mid-Norway, and another two divisions at Trondheim. The French government pushed for action to be taken to confront the Germans away from France.

These developments concerned the Germans. The Molotov–Ribbentrop Pact had placed Finland within the Soviet sphere of interest, and the Germans therefore claimed neutrality in the conflict. This policy caused a rise in anti-German sentiment throughout Scandinavia, since it was commonly believed that the Germans were allied with the Soviets. Fears began to crop up in the German high command that Norway and Sweden would then allow Allied troops to transit their territory to go to Finland's aid.

The proposed Allied deployments never occurred, after protests from both Norway and Sweden, when the issue of transfers of troops through their territory was suggested. With the Moscow Peace Treaty on 12 March 1940, the Finland-related Allied plans were dropped. The abandonment of the planned landings put immense French pressure on Neville Chamberlain's British government, and eventually led to the Allies laying mines off the Norwegian coast on 8 April.

=== Vidkun Quisling and initial German investigation ===
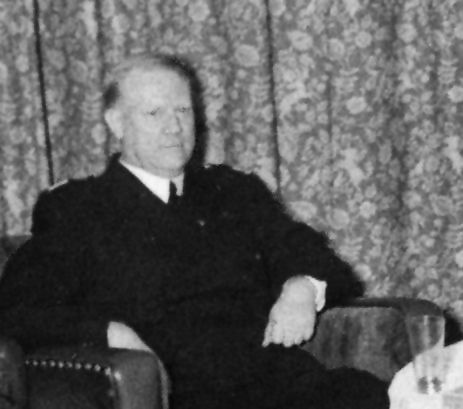
Vidkun Quisling in 1942. His name would become synonymous with "traitor".

The German high command originally thought that having Norway remain neutral was in its interest. As long as the Allies did not enter Norwegian waters, there would be safe passage for merchant vessels transporting ore via Norwegian coastal waters to Germany.

Großadmiral Erich Raeder, however, argued for an invasion. He believed that the Norwegian ports would be of crucial importance for Germany in a war with the United Kingdom.

On 14 December 1939, Raeder introduced Adolf Hitler to Vidkun Quisling, a Nasjonal Samling former defence minister of Norway. Quisling proposed pan-Germanic cooperation between Nazi Germany and Norway. In a second meeting on 18 December, Quisling and Hitler discussed the threat of an Allied invasion of Norway.

After the first meeting with Quisling, Hitler ordered the Oberkommando der Wehrmacht (OKW) to begin investigating possible invasion plans of Norway. Meeting Quisling was central in igniting Hitler's interest in bringing the country effectively under his control. The first comprehensive German plan for the occupation of Norway, Studie Nord, ordered by Hitler on 14 December, was completed by 10 January 1940. On 27 January, Hitler ordered that a new plan, named Weserübung, be developed. Work on Weserübung began on 5 February.

=== Altmark incident ===
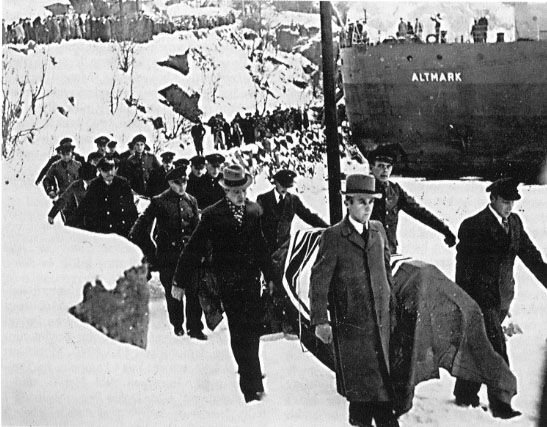
German dead are brought ashore for burial after the Altmark Incident.

The Altmark incident occurred in the late hours of 16 February 1940 when the Royal Navy destroyer HMS Cossack entered Norwegian territorial waters, intercepting and boarding the German auxiliary ship Altmark in the Jøssingfjorden, near the village of Jøssingfjord. Altmark had spent the prior months as a fleet oiler turned prison ship for the German cruiser Admiral Graf Spee while the latter was acting as a commerce raider in the South Atlantic. When she began the return journey to Germany, she carried 299 prisoners taken from Allied ships sunk by the Graf Spee. She rounded Scotland, then entered Norwegian territorial waters near the Trondheimsfjord, flying the Imperial Service Flag (Reichsdienstflagge). A Norwegian naval escort accompanied Altmark as she proceeded southwards, hugging the Norwegian coastline. As Altmark was nearing Bergen harbour on 14 February, the Norwegian naval authorities demanded an inspection of her cargo. International law did not ban the transfer of prisoners of war through neutral waters, and the German captain refused the inspection. This led the commander in Bergen, Admiral Carsten Tank-Nielsen, to deny Altmark access to the restricted-access harbour zone. Tank-Nielsen was overruled by his superior, Admiral Henry Diesen, and she was escorted through. Per Norwegian neutrality regulations, government ships operated by the warring countries were forbidden from such strategically important Norwegian ports. This violation of the regulations was because Diesen feared that the British would intercept Altmark if she was forced to sail further out.

On 16 February, Altmark was spotted by three British aircraft. This led the Royal Navy to send one light cruiser and five destroyers that were patrolling nearby. Under the attack of two British destroyers (HMS Ivanhoe and Intrepid), Altmark fled into the Jøssingfjord. She was escorted by the Norwegian torpedo boat Skarv. She was joined later in the fjord by a second – Kjell – and the patrol boat Firern. As HMS Cossack entered the fjord at 22:20 local time, the Norwegian vessels did not intervene when the British boarded Altmark in the late hours of 16 February. The boarding action led to the freeing of 299 British prisoners of war held on the German ship. The boarding party fought in hand-to-hand combat with the crew of Altmark, killing seven German sailors.

Following this, the Germans sent strong protests to Norway, and the Norwegians sent protests to Britain. While Norwegian, Swedish and American experts in international law claimed the boarding of Altmark was a violation of Norwegian neutrality, the British government argued that the incident was at the most a technical violation that had been morally justified. The whole led to the Germans speeding up their plans for an invasion of Norway. On 21 February, General Nikolaus von Falkenhorst was placed in charge of its planning and in command of the land-based forces. The official approval for the invasion and occupation of Denmark and Norway was signed by Hitler on 1 March.

== Initial plans ==
=== Allied plans ===
With the end of the Winter War, the Allies determined that any occupation of Norway or Sweden would likely do more harm than good, possibly driving the neutral countries into an alliance with Germany. However, the new French prime minister, Paul Reynaud, took a more aggressive stance than his predecessor and wanted some form of action taken against Germany. Churchill was a strong agitator for action in Scandinavia because he wanted to cut Germany off from Sweden and push the Scandinavian countries to side with the United Kingdom. This initially involved a 1939 plan to penetrate the Baltic with a naval force. This was soon changed to a plan involving the mining of Norwegian waters to stop iron ore shipments from Narvik and provoke Germany into attacking Norway, where it could be defeated by the Royal Navy.

It was agreed to use Churchill's naval mining plan, Operation Wilfred, designed to remove the sanctuary of Norway's coastal waterways and force transport ships into international waters, where the Royal Navy could engage and destroy them. Accompanying this would be Plan R 4, an operation where, upon almost certain German counteraction to Operation Wilfred, the Allies would then proceed to occupy Narvik, Trondheim, Bergen, and Stavanger. The planners hoped that the operation would not provoke the Norwegians to resist the Allies with armed force.

The Allies disagreed over the additional Operation Royal Marine, where mines would also be placed in the Rhine River. While the British supported this operation, the French vetoed it for three months since they also depended on the Rhine and feared German air raids on their aircraft and munitions factories. Because of this delay, Operation Wilfred, originally scheduled for 5 April, was delayed until 8 April when the British agreed to undertake the Norwegian operations separately from those on the continent.

=== German plans ===
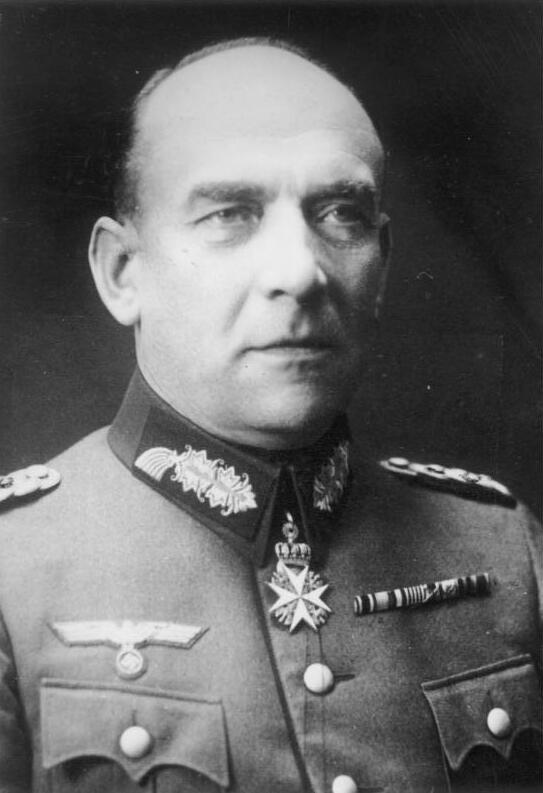
General Nikolaus von Falkenhorst planned and led the German invasion and conquest of Norway

Already in low-priority planning for months, Operation Weserübung (Note: Weserübung is a name of typical military disinformation, i.e. a codename after the Weser in Germany. Übung means "exercise".) found a new sense of urgency after the Altmark incident. The goals of the invasion were to secure the port of Narvik and the coastal waterways for ore transport, and to control the country to prevent collaboration with the Allies. It was to be presented as an armed protection of Norway's neutrality.

One subject debated by German strategists was the occupation of Denmark. Denmark was considered vital because its location facilitated greater air and naval control of the area. While some wanted to simply pressure Denmark to acquiesce, it was eventually determined that it would be safer for the operation if Denmark were captured by force.

Another matter that caused additional reworking of the plan was Fall Gelb, the proposed invasion of northern France and the Low Countries, which would require the bulk of German forces. Because some forces were needed for both invasions, Weserübung could not occur at the same time as Gelb, and because the nights, which provided vital cover for the naval forces, were shortening as spring approached, it therefore had to be sooner. Eventually, on 2 April, the Germans set 9 April as the day of the invasion (Wesertag), and 04:15 (Norwegian time) as the hour of the landings (Weserzeit).

In Norway, the German plan called for the capture of six primary targets by amphibious landings: Oslo, Kristiansand, Egersund, Bergen, Trondheim and Narvik. Additionally, supporting Fallschirmjäger (paratroops) were to capture other key locations, such as airfields at Fornebu outside Oslo and Sola outside Stavanger. The plan was designed to quickly overwhelm the Norwegian defenders and occupy these vital areas before any form of organized resistance could be mounted. The following forces were thus organized:

- Gruppe 1: Ten destroyers transporting 2,000 Gebirgsjäger troops commanded by General Eduard Dietl to Narvik
- Gruppe 2: The heavy cruiser Admiral Hipper and four destroyers to Trondheim
- Gruppe 3: The light cruisers Köln and Königsberg, with several smaller support vessels to Bergen
- Gruppe 4: The light cruiser Karlsruhe and several smaller support vessels to Kristiansand
- Gruppe 5: The heavy cruisers Blücher and Lützow, the light cruiser Emden and several smaller support vessels to Oslo
- Gruppe 6: Four minesweepers to Egersund

Additionally, the battleships Scharnhorst and Gneisenau would escort Gruppe 1 and Gruppe 2 as they travelled together, and there would also be several echelons of transports carrying additional troops, fuel and equipment.

Against Denmark, two motorized brigades would capture bridges and troops; paratroops would capture Aalborg airfield in the north, and heavy fighters of the Luftwaffe would destroy the Danish aircraft on the ground. While there were also several naval task groups organized for this invasion, none of them had any large ships. Unescorted troopships would transport soldiers to capture the Danish High Command in Copenhagen. The following German naval forces used to invade Denmark were as organized:

- Gruppe 7: Deutschland-class battleship Schleswig-Holstein, two transports, two minesweepers and six trawlers to land one regiment at Korsør and a company at Nyborg.
- Gruppe 8: One minelayer, an icebreaker and two patrol boats to land one battalion at Copenhagen.
- Gruppe 9: One freighter, two tugboats and seven minesweepers to land one company at Middlefart and Fredericia.
- Gruppe 10: One escort sloop and 20 minesweepers to land two companies from the 170th Infantry Division at Esbjerg.
- Gruppe 11: One minesweeper depot ship and 14 minesweepers to land a company from the 170th Infantry Division at Thyborøn.

The Germans hoped they could avoid armed confrontation with the residents of both countries, and their troops were instructed to fire only if fired upon.

== Opposing forces ==
=== German ===
The German forces used in the campaign were some 120,000 troops in seven divisions and one Fallschirmjäger battalion, as well as panzer and artillery units. Most of the Kriegsmarine's major units were also earmarked for the campaign. The Luftwaffe's 10th Air Corps deployed against Norway consisted of 1,000 aircraft, including 500 transport planes and 186 Heinkel He 111 bombers.

=== Norwegian and Allied ===
The Norwegian Armed Forces fielded around 55,000 combatants involved in the fighting, including 19,000 soldiers, mainly in six infantry divisions. The Norwegian Army had around 60,000 trained soldiers, with 3,750 troops per regiment. However, due to the Germans' speed and surprise, only 52,000 ever saw combat. The Allied expeditionary force numbered around 38,000 men.

== German invasion ==
=== Fleet movements ===
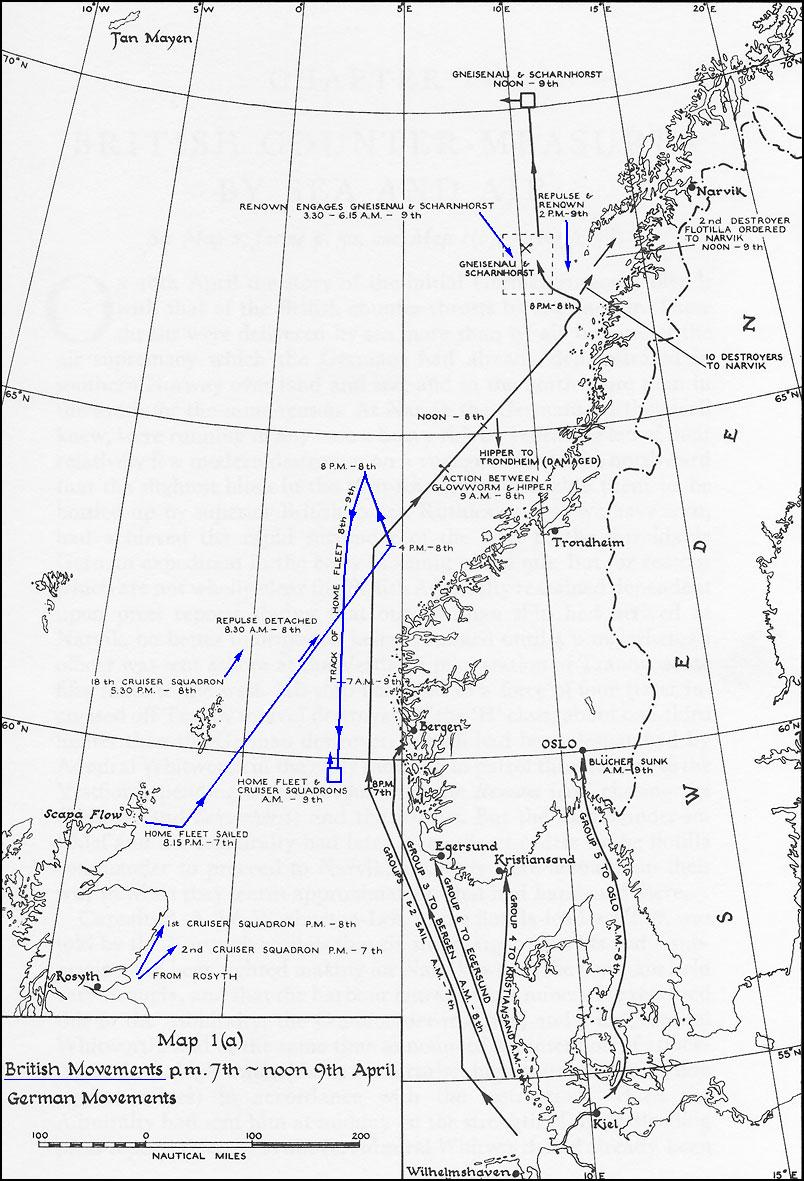
German and British naval movements from 7–9 April

The German invasion began on 3 April 1940, when covert supply vessels began to head out in advance of the main force. The Allies initiated their plans on the following day, with 16 Allied submarines ordered to the Skagerrak and Kattegat to serve as a screen and give advance warning of a German response to Operation Wilfred, which was launched the following day when Rear-Admiral William Whitworth, Rear-Admiral Commanding, Battlecruiser Squadron, in HMS Renown set out from Scapa Flow for the Vestfjorden with twelve destroyers.

On 7 April, bad weather began to develop in the region, blanketing the area with thick fog and causing rough seas, making travel difficult. Renown's force was soon caught in a heavy snowstorm, and HMS Glowworm, one of the destroyer escorts, had to drop out of formation to search for a man swept overboard. The weather aided the Germans, providing a screen for their forces, and in the early morning they sent out Gruppe 1 and Gruppe 2, which had the longest distance to travel.

Although the weather did make reconnaissance difficult, the two German groups were discovered 170 km (110 mi) south of the Naze (the southernmost part of Norway) slightly after 08:00 by Royal Air Force (RAF) patrols and reported as one cruiser and six destroyers. A trailing squad of bombers sent out to attack the German ships found them 125 km (78 mi) farther north than they had been before. No damage was inflicted by the attack, but the German group's strength was reassessed as being one battlecruiser, (Note: At the time, the Royal Navy classified the Scharnhorst-class battleships as battlecruisers.) two cruisers and ten destroyers. Because of a strict enforcement of radio silence, the bombers were not able to report this until 17:30.

On learning of the German movement, the Admiralty came to the conclusion that the Germans were attempting to break the blockade that the Allies had placed on Germany and use their fleet to disrupt Atlantic trade routes. Admiral Sir Charles Forbes, Commander-in-Chief of the British Home Fleet, was notified of this and set out to intercept them at 20:15.

With both sides unaware of the magnitude of the situation, they proceeded as planned. Renown arrived at the Vestfjord late that night and maintained position near the entrance while the minelaying destroyers proceeded to their task. Meanwhile, the Germans launched the remainder of their invasion force. The first direct contact between the two sides occurred the next morning without either side's intention.

Glowworm, on her way to rejoin Renown, happened to come up behind Z11 Bernd von Arnim and then Z18 Hans Lüdemann in the heavy fog around 08:00 on 8 April. Immediately a skirmish broke out and the German destroyers fled, signalling for help. The request was soon answered by Admiral Hipper, which quickly crippled Glowworm. During the action, Glowworm rammed Admiral Hipper. Significant damage was done to Admiral Hipper's starboard side, and Glowworm sank. During the fight Glowworm had broken radio silence and informed the Admiralty of her situation. She was not able to complete her transmission though, and all the Admiralty knew was that Glowworm had been confronted by a large German ship, shots were fired, and contact with the destroyer could not be re-established. In response, the Admiralty ordered Renown and her single destroyer escort (the other two had gone to friendly ports for fuel), to abandon her post at the Vestfjord and head to Glowworm's last known location. At 10:45, the remaining eight destroyers of the minelaying force were ordered to join them as well.

On the morning of 8 April, the Polish submarine ORP Orzeł sank the clandestine German troop transport ship Rio de Janeiro off the southern Norwegian port of Lillesand. Discovered among the wreckage were uniformed German soldiers and military supplies. Though Orzeł reported the incident to the Admiralty, they were too concerned by the situation with Glowworm and the presumed German breakout to give it much thought and did not pass the information on. Many of the German soldiers from the wreck were rescued by Norwegian fishing boats and the destroyer Odin. On interrogation the survivors disclosed that they were assigned to protect Bergen from the Allies. This information was passed on to Oslo, where the Norwegian Parliament ignored the sinking due to being distracted by the British mining operations off the Norwegian coast.

At 14:00, the Admiralty received word that aerial reconnaissance had located a group of German ships a considerable distance west-northwest of Trondheim, bearing west. This reinforced the notion that the Germans were indeed intending a breakout, and the Home Fleet changed direction from northeast to northwest to again try to intercept. Additionally, Churchill cancelled Plan R 4 and ordered the four cruisers carrying the soldiers and their supplies to disembark their cargo and join the Home Fleet. In fact, the German ships, Gruppe 2, were only performing delaying circling manoeuvres to approach their destination of Trondheim at the designated time.

That night, after learning of numerous sightings of German ships south of Norway, Charles Forbes began to doubt the validity of the breakout idea, and he ordered the Home Fleet to head south to the Skagerrak. He also ordered Repulse, along with another cruiser and a few destroyers, to head north and join Renown.

At 23:00, as Forbes was just learning of the incident with Orzeł, Gruppe 5 was confronted by the Norwegian patrol vessel Pol III at the entrance to the Oslofjord. Pol III quickly sent an alarm to the coastal batteries on Rauøy (Rauøy island) and opened fire on the torpedo boat Albatros with her single gun shortly before colliding with it. Albatros and two of her companions responded with anti-aircraft fire, killing the Norwegian captain and setting Pol III on fire. Gruppe 5 continued into the Oslofjord and cleared the outer batteries without incident. Several of the smaller German ships then broke off to capture the bypassed fortifications along with Horten.

This activity did not go unnoticed, and soon reports had reached Oslo, leading to a midnight session of the Norwegian cabinet. At this meeting, the cabinet issued orders for the mobilization of four of the six field brigades of the Norwegian Army. The members of the cabinet failed to understand that the partial mobilization they had ordered would, according to the regulations in place, be carried out in secret and without public declaration. Troops would be issued their mobilization orders by post. The only member of the cabinet with in-depth knowledge of the mobilization system, Defence Minister Birger Ljungberg, failed to explain the procedure to his colleagues. He would later be heavily criticized for this oversight, which led to unnecessary delays in the Norwegian mobilization. Prior to the cabinet meeting, Ljungberg had dismissed repeated demands for a total and immediate mobilization, made by the chief of the general staff, Rasmus Hatledal. Hatledal had approached Ljungberg on 5, 6 and 8 April, asking the defence minister to request the cabinet issue orders for mobilization. The issue had been discussed in the evening of 8 April, after the commanding general, Kristian Laake, had joined the calls for a mobilization. At that time the mobilization had been limited to two field battalions in Østfold, further delaying the larger-scale call-up of troops. When Laake's call for mobilization was finally accepted sometime between 03:30 and 04:00 on 9 April, Laake assumed, like Defence Minister Ljungberg, that the cabinet knew that they were issuing a partial and silent mobilization. The poor communication between the Norwegian armed forces and the civilian authorities caused much confusion in the early days of the German invasion.

At about this time, further north, Renown was heading back to Vestfjord after reaching Glowworm's last known location and not finding anything. Heavy seas had caused Whitworth to sail further north than normal, and he was separated from his destroyers when he encountered Scharnhorst and Gneisenau. Renown engaged the two battlecruisers off the Lofoten Archipelago, and during the short battle Renown scored several hits on the German vessels, forcing them to flee north. Renown attempted to pursue, but the German warships used their superior speed to escape.

=== Weserzeit ===
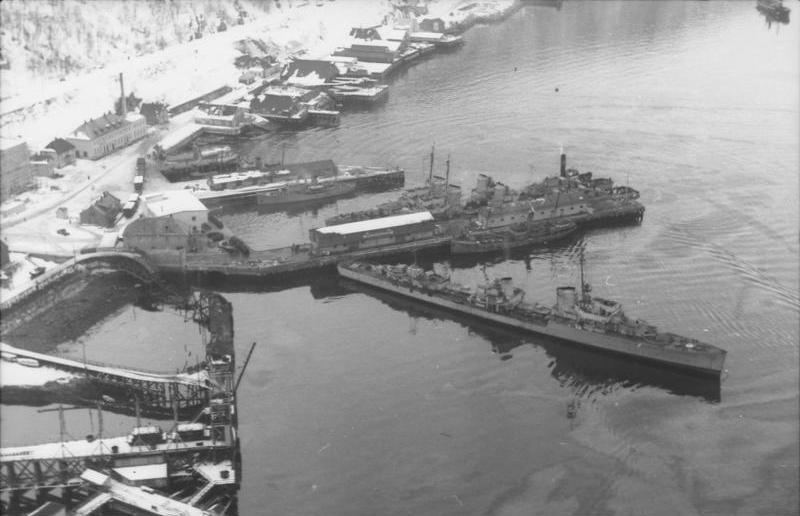
German destroyers at Narvik after their capture of the strategic port

In the Ofotfjord leading to Narvik, the ten German destroyers of Gruppe 1 made their approach. With Renown and her escorts earlier diverted to investigate the Glowworm incident, no British ships stood in their way, and they sailed into the area unopposed. By the time they had reached the inner area near Narvik, most of the destroyers had peeled off from the main formation to capture the outer batteries of the Ofotfjord, leaving only three to contend with the two old Norwegian coastal defence ships standing guard in Narvik harbour, Eidsvold and Norge. Although antiquated, the two coastal defence ships were quite capable of taking on the much more lightly armed and armoured destroyers. After a quick parley with the captain of Eidsvold, Odd Isaachsen Willoch, the German ships opened fire on the coastal defence ship, sinking her after hitting her with three torpedoes. Norge entered into the fray shortly after and began to fire on the destroyers, but her marksmen were inexperienced and she did not hit the Germans ships before being sunk by a salvo of torpedoes from the German destroyers.

Following the sinking of Eidsvold and Norge, the commander of Narvik, Konrad Sundlo, surrendered the land forces in the town without a fight.

At Trondheim, Gruppe 2 also faced only minor resistance to their landings. In the Trondheimsfjord, Admiral Hipper engaged the defensive batteries while her destroyers sped past them at 25 knots (46 km/h). A well placed shot by Admiral Hipper severed the power cables for the searchlights and rendered the guns ineffective. Only one destroyer received a hit during the landing.

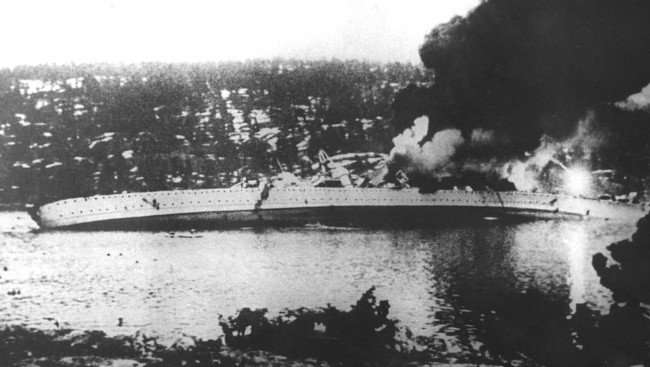
The German cruiser Blücher sinking in the Oslofjord

At Bergen, the defensive fortifications put up stiffer resistance to Gruppe 3's approach and the light cruiser Königsberg and the artillery training ship Bremse were damaged, the former seriously. The lack of working lights reduced the effectiveness of the guns though, and the landing ships were able to dock without much opposition. The fortifications were surrendered soon after, when Luftwaffe units arrived.

The fortifications at Kristiansand put up an even more resolute fight, twice repulsing the landing and damaging Karlsruhe, nearly causing her to run aground. Confusion soon sprung up though, when the Norwegians received the order not to fire on British and French ships and the Germans began to use Norwegian codes that they had captured at Horten. The Germans also used this opportunity to quickly reach the harbour and unload their troops, capturing the town by 11:00.

While most of Gruppe 4 was engaged at Kristiansand, the torpedo boat Greif captured Arendal without any opposition. The main objective at Arendal was the undersea telegraph cable to the United Kingdom.

Gruppe 5 encountered the most serious resistance at the inner defensive fortifications of the Oslofjord, in the vicinity of Drøbak. Blücher, leading the group, approached the forts assuming that they would be taken by surprise and not respond in time, as had been the case with those in the outer fjord. It was not until the cruiser was at point-blank range that Oscarsborg Fortress opened fire, hitting with every shell. Within a matter of minutes, Blücher was crippled and burning heavily. The damaged cruiser was sunk by a salvo of antiquated, 40-year-old torpedoes launched from land-based torpedo tubes. She carried much of the administrative personnel intended both for the occupation of Norway and also for the headquarters of the army division assigned to seize Oslo. The cruiser Lützow, also damaged in the attack and believing Blücher had entered a minefield, withdrew with Gruppe 5, 19 km (12 mi) south to Sonsbukten where she unloaded her troops. This distance delayed the arrival of the main German invasion force for Oslo by over 24 hours, though the Norwegian capital would still be captured less than 12 hours after the loss of Blücher by troops flown into Fornebu Airport near the city.

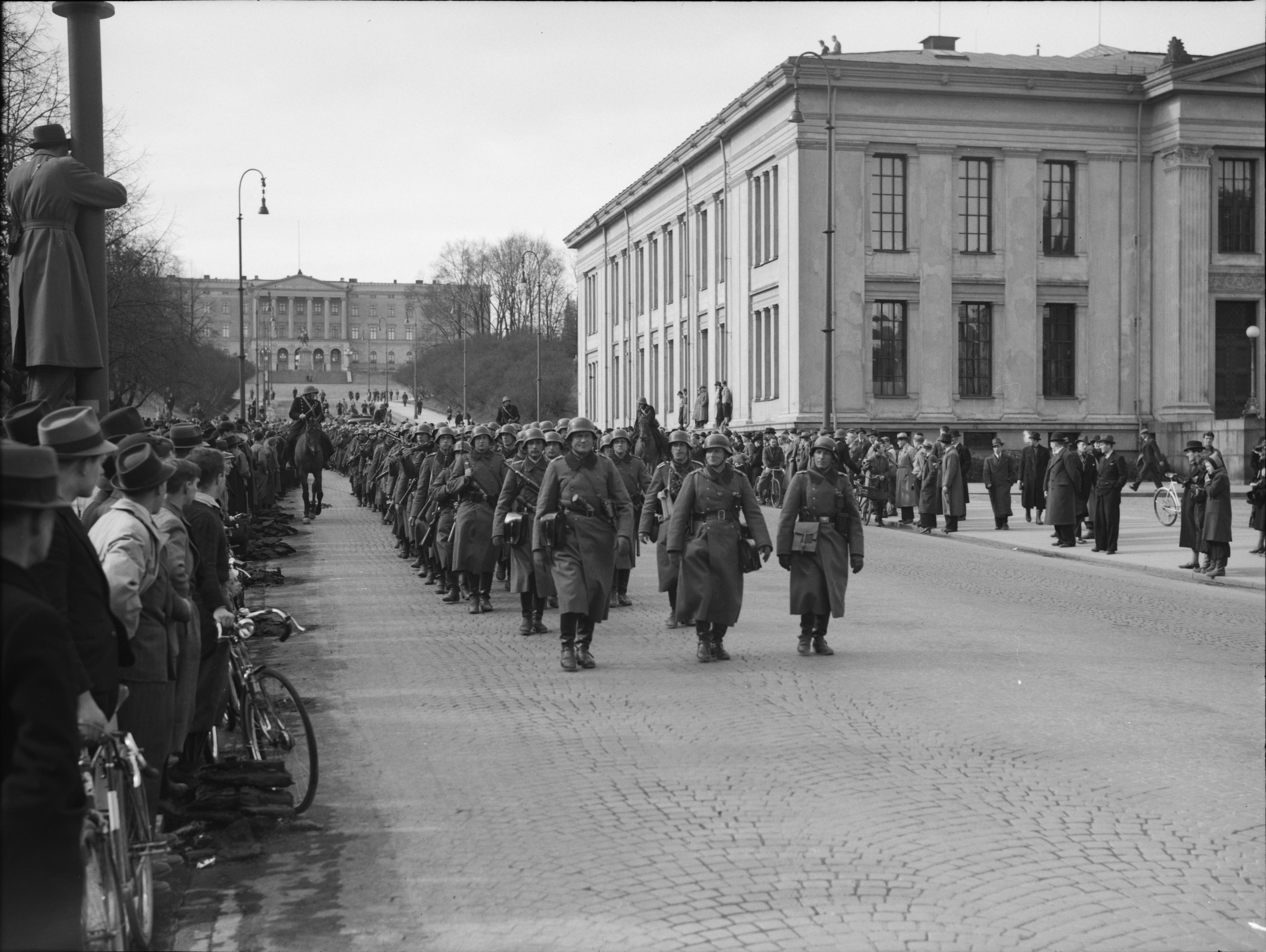
German soldiers marching through Oslo on the first day of the invasion

The delay induced by the Norwegian forces gave time for the royal family, Parliament, and with them the national treasury, to flee the capital and continue the fighting against the invasion force.

Fornebu Airport was originally supposed to be secured by paratroops an hour before the first troops were flown in, but the initial force became lost in the fog and did not arrive. Regardless, the airfield was not heavily defended and the German soldiers who did arrive captured it promptly. The Norwegian Army Air Service's Jagevingen fighter flight based at Fornebu Airport resisted with their Gloster Gladiator biplane fighters until ammunition ran out and then flew off to whatever secondary airfields were available. The ground personnel of the Fighter Wing soon ran out of ammunition for their anti-aircraft machine guns as well; in the general confusion and focus on readying the fighters for action, no one had the presence of mind or the time to issue small-arms ammunition for the personal weapons of the ground personnel. Resistance at Fornebu Airport came to an end, with the Germans' only loss being a single Junkers Ju 52. Norwegian attempts to mount a counter-attack were half-hearted and effectively came to nothing. On learning of this, Oslo was declared an open city and soon fully surrendered.

For Gruppe 6 at Egersund and the paratroops at Stavanger, there was no significant opposition and they quickly captured their objectives.

==== Battle of Midtskogen ====
This battle, although very small, had saved the Norwegian royal family. As the invasion had begun, the Norwegian Government fled to nearby Hamar. Among them, a group of Norwegian Royal Guardsmen and some soldiers, possibly from the 5th Regiment in nearby Elverum took positions in Midtskogen to try to stop or slow down the Germans so that the Norwegian royal family could evacuate.

In the morning of 10 April, a firefight ended with the retreat of both sides as Captain Spiller, the leader of the German Fallschirmjager, had been hit. Casualties are estimated to five Germans killed and an unknown number wounded, and three Norwegians hit.

==== Conquest of Denmark ====
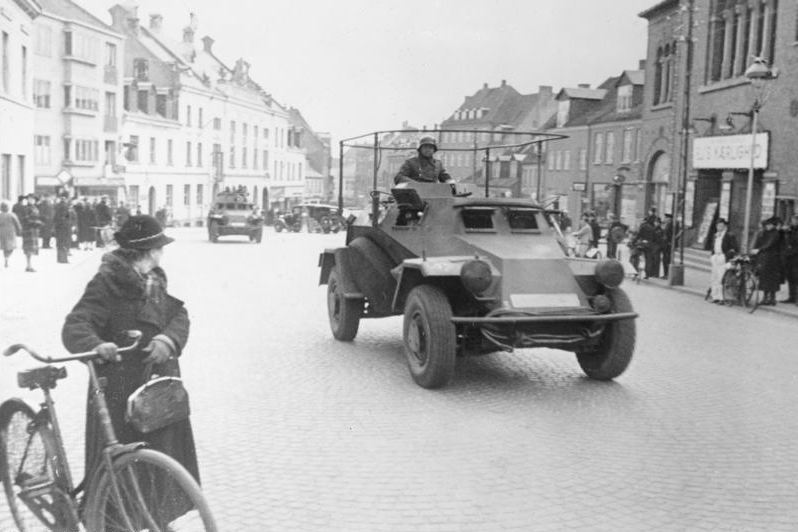
German armoured cars moving through Viborg

The German plans for the invasion and occupation of Norway relied heavily on air power. To secure the Skagerrak strait between Norway and Denmark, the air bases in Denmark had to be seized. The domination of this strait would prevent the Royal Navy from interfering with the main supply lines of the invasion forces. In this respect, the occupation of Denmark was considered to be vital. The capture of Aalborg Airport was considered particularly important in this respect.

The German Wehrmacht crossed the Danish border around 05:15 on 9 April. In a coordinated operation, German troops disembarked at the docks of Langelinie in the Danish capital, Copenhagen, and began occupying the city. German paratroops also captured Aalborg Airport. Simultaneously, an ultimatum was presented by the German ambassador to King Christian X. The Danish army was small, ill-prepared and used obsolete equipment, but resisted in several parts of the country; most importantly, the Royal Guards located at Amalienborg Palace in Copenhagen, and forces in the vicinity of Haderslev in South Jutland. By 06:00, the small Danish Air Force had been taken out and 28 German Heinkel He 111 bombers were threatening to drop their bombs over Copenhagen. King Christian, having consulted with Prime Minister Thorvald Stauning, Foreign Minister Peter Munch and the commanders of the army and the navy, decided to capitulate, believing that further resistance would only result in a useless loss of Danish lives. By 08:43 Denmark had capitulated. The Danish public was taken completely by surprise by the occupation, and was instructed by the government to cooperate with the German authorities. Germany's occupation of Denmark lasted until 5 May 1945.

An important part of the Danish merchant marine escaped the occupation, as Arnold Peter Møller, President of the Mærsk shipping company, on 8 April instructed his ships on the high seas to move to Allied or neutral ports if at all possible.

In a pre-emptive move to prevent a German invasion, British forces occupied the Faroe Islands on 12 April 1940, then a Danish amt (county). The Danish county governor and the Faroese parliament Løgting governed the islands for the duration of the war.

=== Allied response ===
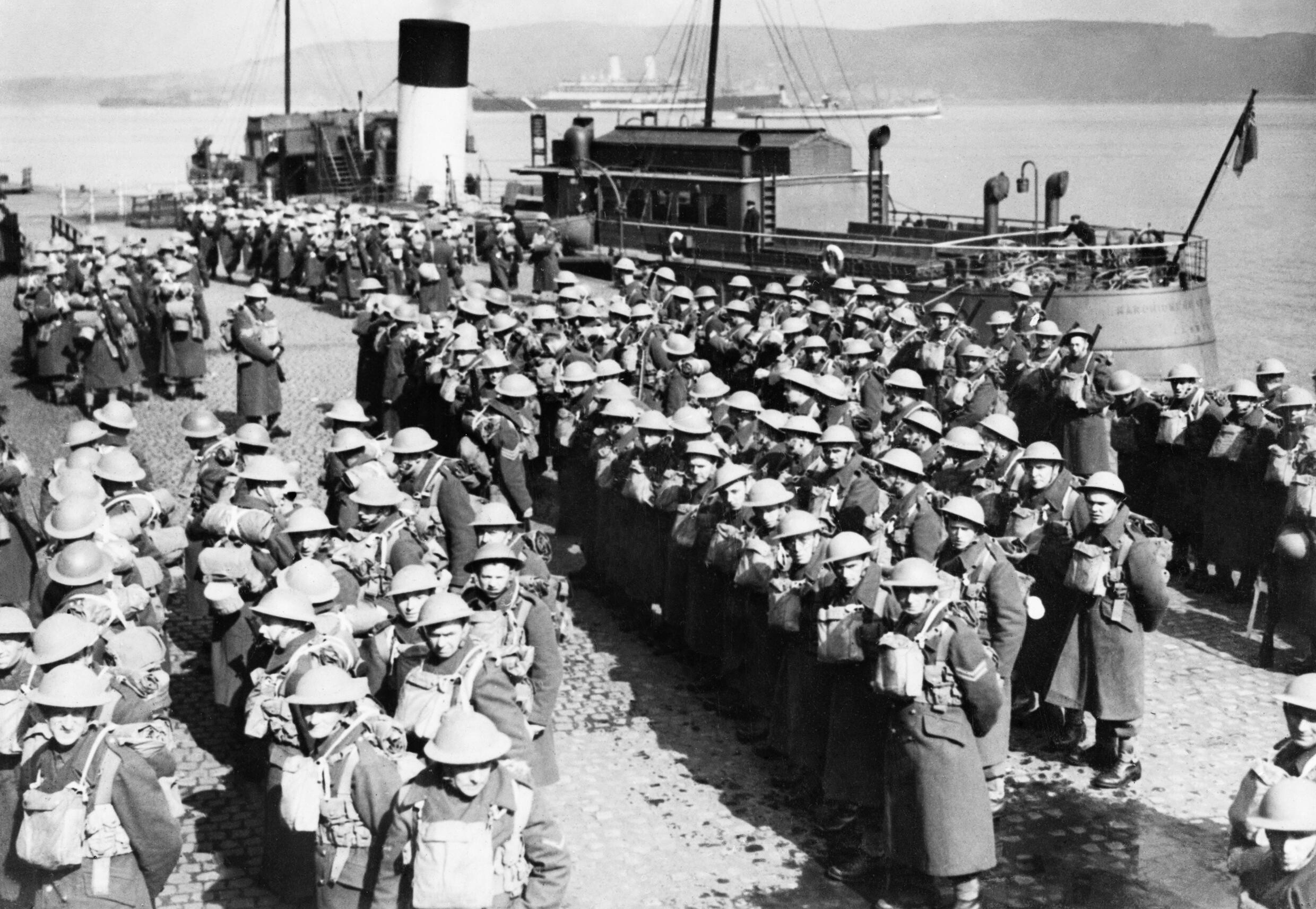
British troops lined up at Gourock in Scotland before embarking for Norway, 20 April 1940

Soon after this, the German landings at Trondheim, Bergen, and Stavanger, as well as the skirmishes in the Oslofjord became known. Not willing to disperse too thinly due to the unknown location of the two German battleships, the Home Fleet chose to focus on nearby Bergen and dispatched an attack force. RAF reconnaissance soon reported stronger opposition than anticipated, and this, along with the possibility that the Germans might be controlling the shore defences, caused them to recall the force and instead use the aircraft carrier HMS Furious to launch torpedo bombers at the enemy ships. The attack never commenced though, as Luftwaffe bombers launched an assault of their own against the Home Fleet first. This attack sank the destroyer HMS Gurkha and then forced the Home Fleet to withdraw north when their anti-aircraft measures proved ineffective. This German air superiority in the area led the British to decide that all southern regions had to be left to submarines and the RAF, while surface vessels would concentrate on the north.

In addition to the German landings in south and central Norway, the Admiralty was also informed via press reports that a single German destroyer was in Narvik. In response to this, they ordered the 2nd Destroyer Flotilla, mostly consisting of ships previously serving as escort destroyers for Operation Wilfred, to engage. This flotilla, under the command of Captain Bernard Warburton-Lee, had already detached from Renown during her pursuit of Scharnhorst and Gneisenau, being ordered to guard the entrance to the Vestfjord. At 16:00 on 9 April, the flotilla sent an officer ashore in Tranøy Municipality, about 80 km (50 mi) west of Narvik and learned from the locals that the German force was 4–6 destroyers and a submarine. Warburton-Lee sent these findings back to the Admiralty, concluding with his intention to attack the next day at "dawn, high water", which would give him the element of surprise and protection against any mines. This decision was approved by the Admiralty in a telegram that night.

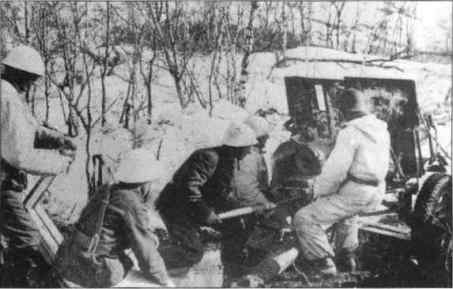
Norwegian Artillery at Narvik

==== First Battle of Narvik ====
Though ten German destroyers had originally taken Narvik, only five remained in the harbour, with three others moving North and the remaining two going west. Early the following morning, Warburton-Lee led his flagship, HMS Hardy, and four other destroyers into the Ofotfjord. At 04:30, he arrived at Narvik harbour and entered along with HMS Hunter and HMS Havock, leaving HMS Hotspur and HMS Hostile to guard the entrance and watch the shore batteries. The fog and snow were extremely heavy, allowing Warburton-Lee's force to approach undetected. When they arrived at the harbour itself they found five German destroyers and opened fire, starting the First Battle of Narvik. Warburton-Lee's ships made three passes on the enemy ships, being joined after the first by Hotspur and Hostile, and sank two of the destroyers, disabled one more, and sank six tankers and supply ships. The German commander, Commodore Friedrich Bonte, lost his life when his flagship Z21 Wilhelm Heidkamp was sunk.

However, Captain Warburton-Lee would make a fatal error when he decided to attack the German destroyers one last time. The German destroyers from the North and West converged on the British Fleet at 06:00, while the British were preparing for the final attack. Hardy was severely damaged and beached, and Warburton-Lee was killed. Hunter and Hotspur were both critically damaged, and Hotspur ran into the sinking Hunter. Hostile and Havock meanwhile had raced ahead, but turned about and came back to aid the retreat of Hotspur. The German destroyers were low on fuel and ammunition, allowing Hostile and Havock to come back to aid the retreat of Hotspur.

==== Second Battle of Narvik ====
Shortly after the First Battle of Narvik, two more German ships were sunk by British forces. During the night of 9/10 April, the submarine HMS Truant intercepted and sank the light cruiser Karlsruhe shortly after she had left Kristiansand. On 10 April, the Fleet Air Arm made a long-range attack from their base at RNAS Hatston (also called HMS Sparrowhawk) in the Orkney Islands against German warships in Bergen harbour. The attack sank the disabled German light cruiser Königsberg.

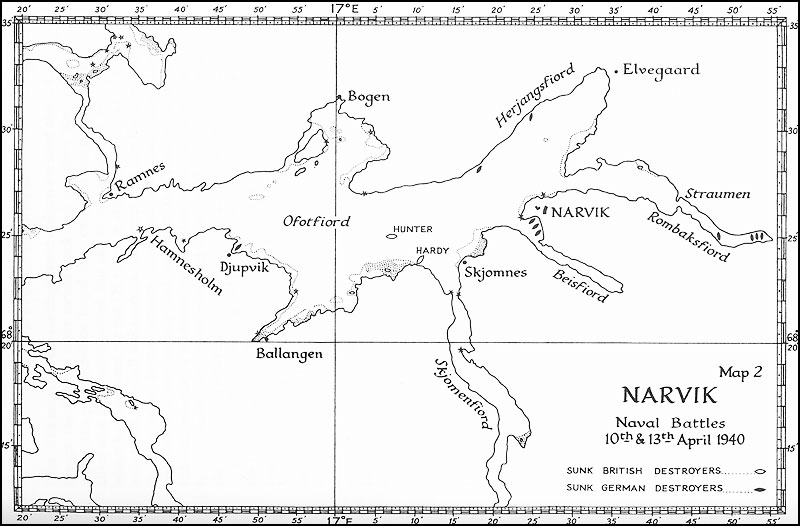
The British-German naval battles at Narvik on 10 and 13 April

On 10 April, Furious and the battleship HMS Warspite joined the Home Fleet, and another air attack was made against Trondheim hoping to sink Admiral Hipper. Admiral Hipper, however, had already managed to escape through the watch set up outside the port and was on her way back to Germany when the attack was launched; none of the remaining German destroyers or support ships were hit in the assault. In contrast, in the south HMS Spearfish severely damaged the German heavy cruiser Lützow at midnight on 11 April, putting Lützow out of commission for a year.

With it becoming more evident that the German fleet had slipped out of Norwegian waters, the Home Fleet continued north to Narvik in the hope of catching the remaining destroyers. En route the ships suffered further harassment from German bombers, forcing them to divert to the west away from the shoreline. By 12 April, they were in range of Narvik and an aerial attack on Narvik from Furious was attempted, but the results were disappointing. It was instead decided to send in the battleship Warspite and a powerful escort force, to be commanded by Whitworth.

On the morning of 13 April, Whitworth's force entered the Vestfjord using Warspite's Swordfish floatplane to guide the way. Aside from locating two of the German destroyers, the scouting aircraft also sank the U-64, the first submarine kill by an aircraft. Warspite's destroyers travelled 5 km (3.1 mi) in advance of the battleship and were the first to engage their German counterparts which had come to meet them, thus starting the Second Battle of Narvik. Though neither side inflicted notable damage, the German ships were running low on ammunition and were gradually pushed back to the harbour. By that afternoon, most attempted to flee up the Rombaksfjord, the only exception being Z19 Hermann Künne which beached herself as she made for the Herjangsfjord and was destroyed by HMS Eskimo. Four British destroyers continued to chase the German ships up through the Rombaksfjord, Eskimo was soon damaged by the waiting opposition. However, the German situation was hopeless, having run out of fuel and ammunition, and by the time the remaining British ships arrived, the German crews had abandoned and scuttled their ships. By 18:30 the British ships were making their way out of the now cleared fjord.

== Norwegian situation ==
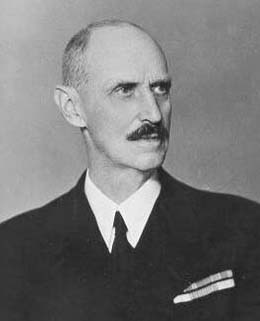
The German forces attempted to kill or capture the 67-year-old King Haakon VII. He personally refused to accept the German surrender terms and stated he would abdicate the throne if the Norwegian government chose to surrender.

The German invasions for the most part achieved their goal of simultaneous assault and caught the Norwegian forces off guard, a situation not aided by the Norwegian government's order for only a partial mobilization. Not all was lost for the Allies though, as the repulsion of the German Gruppe 5 in the Oslofjord gave a few additional hours of time which the Norwegians used to evacuate the royal family and the Norwegian Government to Hamar. With the government now fugitive, Vidkun Quisling used the opportunity to take control of a radio broadcasting station and announce a coup, with himself as the new Prime Minister of Norway. Quisling's coup and his list of new ministers was announced at 19:32. The Quisling coup government remained in place until 15 April, when the Administrative Council was appointed by the Supreme Court of Norway to deal with the civilian administration of the occupied areas of Norway, and Quisling resigned.

In the evening of 9 April, the Norwegian Government moved to Elverum, believing Hamar to be insecure. All German demands were rejected and the Elverum Authorization was passed by the members of the parliament, giving the cabinet wide-ranging powers to make decisions until the next time the Parliament could be assembled under ordinary circumstances. However, the bleakness of the situation prompted them to agree to continued negotiations with the Germans, set for the following day. As a precaution Colonel Otto Ruge, Inspector General of the Norwegian Infantry, set up a roadblock about 110 km (68 mi) north of Oslo, at Midtskogen. The Norwegian position was soon attacked by a small detachment of German troops, led by Eberhard Spiller, the air attaché for the German Embassy, who were racing north in an attempt to capture King Haakon VII. A skirmish broke out and the Germans turned back after Spiller was mortally wounded. On 10 April, the final negotiations between the Norwegians and Germans failed after the Norwegian delegates, led by Haakon VII, refused to accept the German demand for recognition of Quisling's new government. The same day, panic broke out in German-occupied Oslo, following rumours of incoming British bombers. In what has since been known as "the panic day" the city's population fled to the surrounding countryside, not returning until late the same evening or the next day. Similar rumours led to mass panic in Egersund and other occupied coastal cities. The origins of the rumours have never been uncovered.

On 11 April, the day after the German-Norwegian negotiations had broken down, 19 German bombers attacked Elverum. The two-hour bombing raid left the town centre in ruins and 41 people dead. The same day 11 Luftwaffe bombers also attacked the town of Nybergsund, in an attempt at killing the Norwegian King, Crown Prince Olav and cabinet.

One of the final acts of the Norwegian authorities before dispersal was the promotion on 10 April of Otto Ruge to the rank of major general and appointment to Commanding General of the Norwegian Army, responsible for overseeing the resistance to the German invasion. Ruge replaced the 65-year-old General Kristian Laake as Commanding General, the latter having been heavily criticized for what was considered to be passive behaviour during the initial hours of the invasion. Elements in the Norwegian cabinet considered General Laake to be a defeatist. Following the appointment of Ruge the Norwegian attitude became clear, with orders to stop the German advance being issued. With the Germans in control of the largest cities, ports and airfields, as well as most of the arms depots and communication networks, repulsing them outright would be impossible. Ruge instead decided that his only chance lay in playing for time, stalling the Germans until reinforcements from the United Kingdom and France could arrive.

On 11 April, after receiving reinforcements in Oslo, General Falkenhorst's offensive began; its goal was to link up Germany's scattered forces before the Norwegians could effectively mobilize or any major Allied intervention could take place. His first task was to secure the Oslofjord area, then to use the 196th and 163rd Infantry Divisions to establish contact with the forces at Trondheim.

== Ground campaign ==
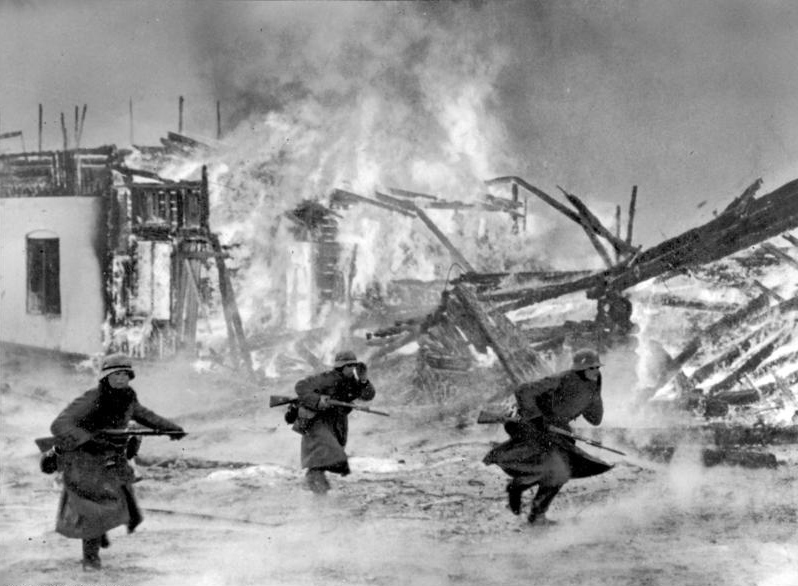
German infantry attacking through a burning Norwegian village in April 1940.

When the nature of the German invasion became apparent to the British military, it began to make preparations for a counter-attack. Dissension among the various branches was strong though, as the British Army, after conferring with Otto Ruge, wanted to assault Trondheim in Central Norway while Churchill insisted on reclaiming Narvik. It was decided to send troops to both locations as a compromise. Admiral Lord Cork was in overall command of the Allied operations.

=== Campaign in eastern Norway ===
After the appointment of Ruge as Commanding General on 10 April, the Norwegian strategy was to fight delaying actions against the Germans advancing northwards from Oslo to link up with the invasion forces at Trondheim. The main aim of the Norwegian effort in eastern Norway was to give the Allies enough time to recapture Trondheim, and start a counter-offensive against the German main force in the Oslo area. The region surrounding the Oslofjord was defended by the 1st Division, commanded by Major General Carl Johan Erichsen. The rest of the region was covered by the 2nd Division, commanded by Major General Jacob Hvinden Haug. Having been prevented from mobilizing in an orderly fashion by the German invasion, improvised Norwegian units were sent into action against the Germans. Several of the units facing the German advance were led by officers especially selected by Ruge to replace commanders who had failed to show sufficient initiative and aggression in the early days of the campaign. The German offensive aimed at linking up their forces in Oslo and Trondheim began on 14 April, with an advance north from Oslo towards the Gudbrandsdalen and Østerdalen valleys. Hønefoss was the first town to fall to the advancing German forces. North of Hønefoss the Germans began meeting Norwegian resistance, first delaying actions and later units fighting organized defensive actions. During intense fighting with heavy casualties on both sides, troops of the Norwegian Infantry Regiment 6 blunted the German advance at the village of Haugsbygd on 15 April. The Germans only broke through the Norwegian lines at Haugsbygd the next day after employing panzers for the first time in Norway. Lacking anti-tank weapons, the Norwegian troops could not hold back the German attack.

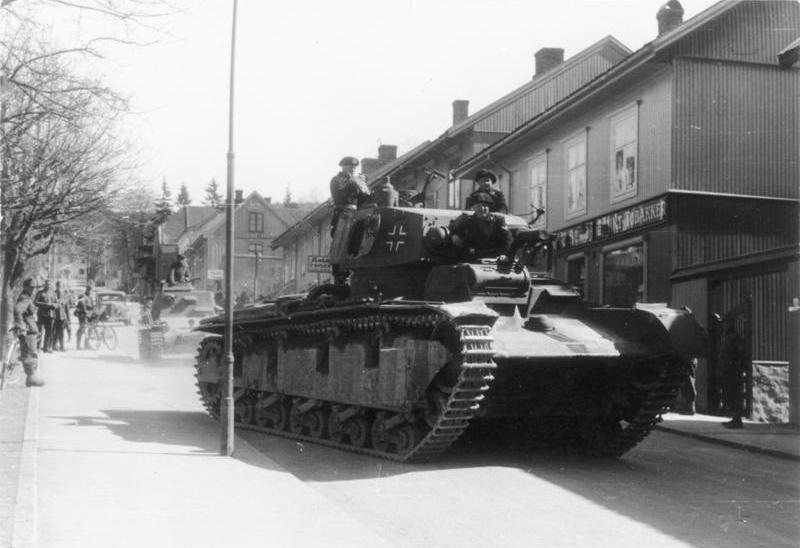
A German Neubaufahrzeug tank advancing through the streets of Lillehammer in April 1940

The basis for the Norwegian strategy started collapsing already on 13 and 14 April, when the 3,000 troops of the 1st Division in Østfold evacuated across the Swedish border without orders, and were interned by the neutral Swedes. The same day that the 1st Division began crossing into Sweden, the two battalions of Infantry Regiment no. 3 at Heistadmoen Army Camp in Kongsberg capitulated. The 3rd Division, commanded by Major General Einar Liljedahl and tasked with defending southern Norway, surrendered to the Germans in Setesdal on 15 April, having seen no action up to that point. Some 2,000 soldiers marched into captivity in the Setesdal capitulation. With the abandonment on 20 April of the Franco-British plans for recapturing the central Norwegian city of Trondheim, Ruge's strategy became practically infeasible.

With the calling off of the Allied plans for recapturing Trondheim, British forces which had been landed at Åndalsnes moved into eastern Norway. By 20 April three British half-battalions had moved as far south as Fåberg Municipality, near the town of Lillehammer. The main British units deployed to eastern Norway in April 1940 were the Territorials of the 148th Infantry Brigade and the regular 15th Infantry Brigade. In a series of battles with Norwegian and British forces over the next weeks the Germans pushed northwards from Oslo, their main effort through the Gudbrandsdal valley. Particularly heavy fighting took place in places like Tretten, Fåvang, Vinstra, Kvam, Sjoa and Otta. In the Battle for Kvam on 25 and 26 April, the British managed to delay the German advance for two days of heavy fighting. Other German units broke through the Valdres and Østerdalen valleys, in the former case after heavy fighting and an initially successful Norwegian counterattack.

During their advance northwards from Oslo the Germans regularly broke down Norwegian resistance using air strikes. Junkers Ju 87 dive bombers proved particularly effective in demoralizing Norwegian troops opposing the advance. The Norwegian forces' almost complete lack of anti-aircraft weapons allowed the German aircraft to operate with near impunity. Likewise, when German panzers were employed the Norwegians had no regular countermeasures. The British No. 263 Squadron RAF fighter squadron set up base on the frozen lake Lesjaskogsvatnet on 24 April to challenge German air supremacy, but many of the squadron's aircraft were destroyed by German bombing on 25 April. The four Gladiators that survived to be evacuated to Setnesmoen army base near Åndalsnes were out of operation by the end of 26 April. Setnesmoen was bombed and knocked out by the Luftwaffe on 29 April.

=== Norwegian collapse in southern Norway ===
After their capture of Kristiansand on 9 April the battalion-strong German invasion force in southern Norway permitted the evacuation of the civilian population from the city. At the same time the Germans moved to secure the areas surrounding Kristiansand. After several days of confusion and episodes of panic among the Norwegian troops, despite the complete absence of fighting, the 2,000 men of the defending 3rd Division in Setesdal surrendered unconditionally on 15 April.

=== Campaign in western Norway ===
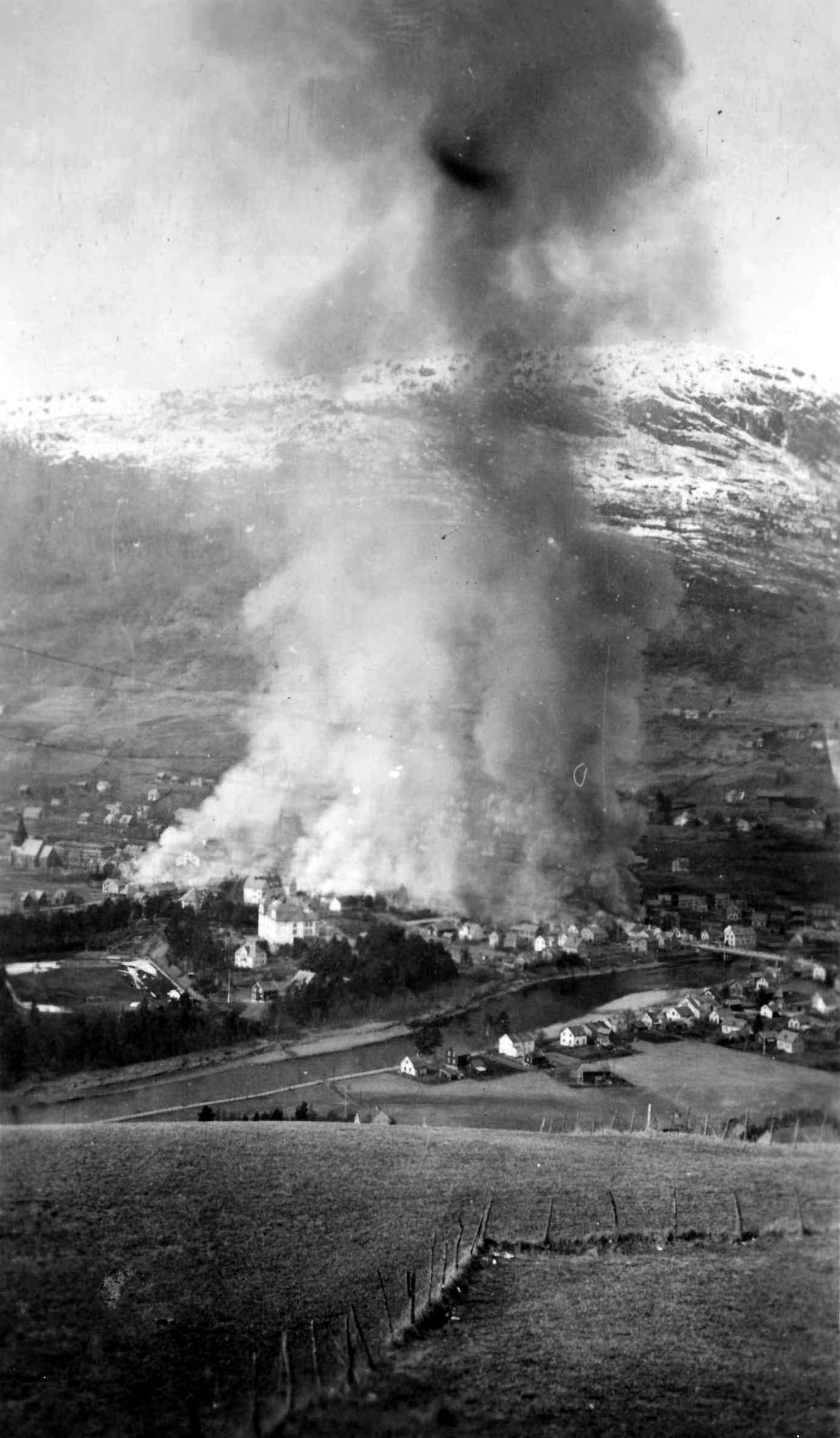
Scene from the German bombing of Voss

The important western cities of Bergen and Stavanger were captured by the Germans on 9 April. Some 2,000 German soldiers occupied Bergen and captured the Norwegian arms depots there. The small Norwegian infantry forces in Bergen retreated eastwards, blowing up two railway bridges and sections of road after them. Despite the loss of the cities, the regional commander, General William Steffens, ordered a total mobilization. During mid-April the 6,000-strong Norwegian 4th Division, responsible for the defence of western Norway, was mobilized around the village of Vossavangen in Hordaland. The 4th Division was the only military district outside northern Norway to be mobilized completely and in an orderly fashion. The soldiers of the 4th Division managed to repulse the initial German push along the Bergen Line railway line connecting western and eastern Norway.

After troops of the more northerly 5th Division had covered the British landings at Åndalsnes, Steffens planned an offensive aimed at recapturing Bergen. To achieve this aim the 4th Division had a total mobilized force of 6,361 soldiers and 554 horses. General Steffens' plans were made redundant when General Ruge on 16 April ordered most of the division's forces to be redeployed to Valdres and Hallingdal, to reinforce the main front in eastern Norway. The focus of the remaining forces in western Norway became to prevent the Germans from advancing from the areas around Bergen. Norwegian naval forces, organized into three regional commands by Admiral Tank-Nielsen, prevented German intrusions into Hardangerfjord and Sognefjord. In total the Royal Norwegian Navy fielded some 17–18 warships and five to six aircraft in western Norway following the German capture of Bergen. After the Luftwaffe bombed and severely damaged Voss and the surrounding countryside on 23–25 April, inflicting civilian casualties, the Germans captured the town on 26 April.

Following the fall of Voss, General Steffens evacuated the remains of his forces northward, evacuating the south side of the Sognefjord on 28 May (except for a small contingent at Lærdal). He set up his own headquarters at Førde and prepared for the further defence of Sogn og Fjordane. On 30 April a message from General Otto Ruge was communicated, telling of the evacuation of all allied troops and also of the King and Army command, from southern Norway. With no help forthcoming from either allied or Norwegian forces, on 1 May 1940, Steffens ordered his troops to disband. The advancing German forces were informed of the whereabouts of the Norwegian troops, and agreed to let them disband unmolested. On the night between 1 May and 2 May, Steffens left for Tromsø with three naval aircraft, effectively ending the campaign in the region. No allied land troops had been involved in the fighting in Hordaland and Sogn og Fjordane. Another two aircraft flew to the United Kingdom to undergo service. Although the Royal Norwegian Navy's ships in western Norway were ordered to evacuate to the United Kingdom or northern Norway, only the auxiliary Bjerk sailed to the United Kingdom and Steinar to northern Norway. The remaining ships were either prevented from leaving due to massive desertions, or had commanders who chose to disband their men rather than risk the voyages to Allied-controlled territory. The last Norwegian forces in western Norway only disbanded in Florø on 18 May 1940.

=== Campaign in central Norway ===
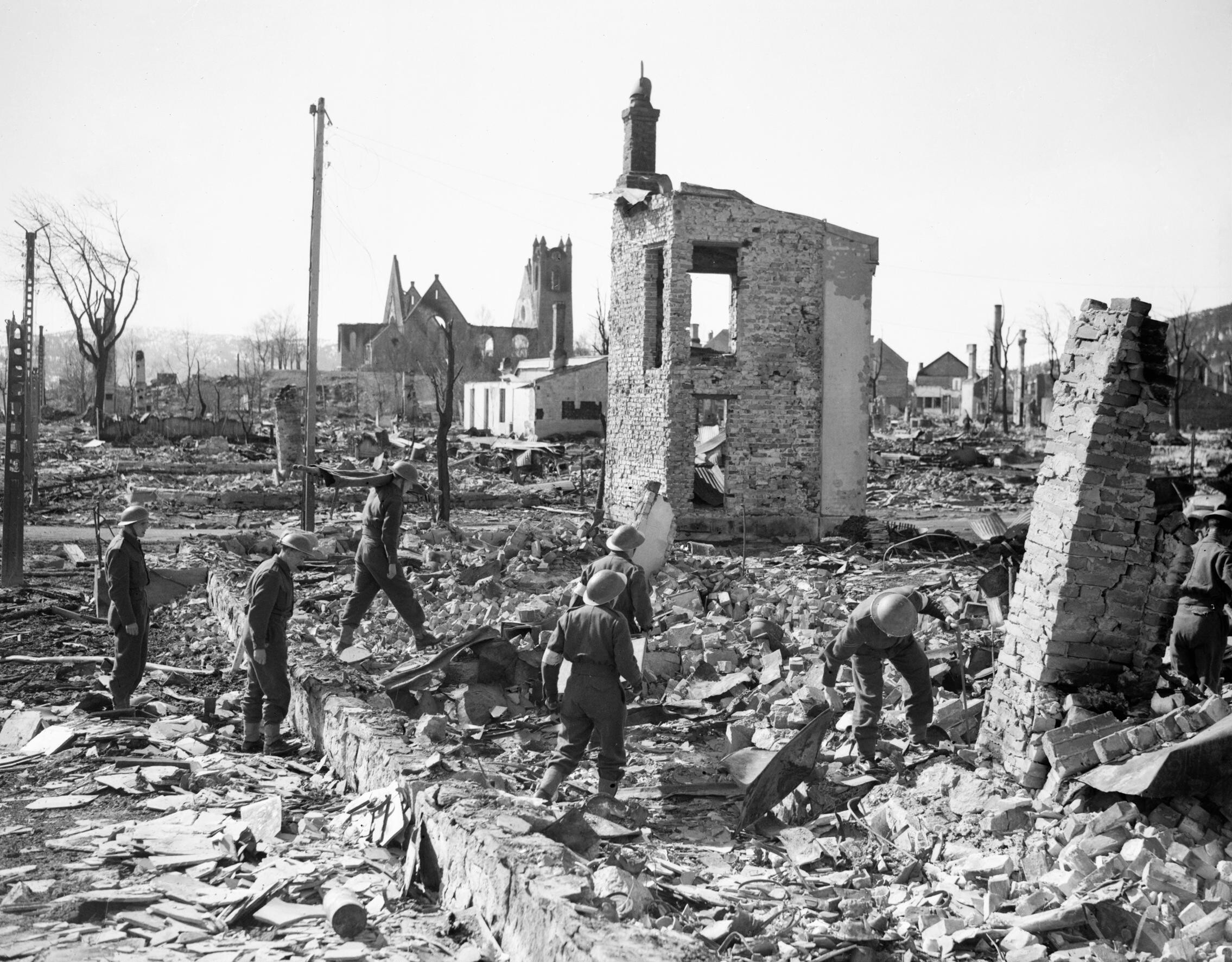
British troops pick through the ruins of Namsos, April 1940

The original plans for the campaign in Central Norway called for a three pronged attack against Trondheim by Allied forces while the Norwegians contained the German forces to the south. It was called Operation Hammer, and would land Allied troops at Namsos to the north (Mauriceforce), Åndalsnes to the south (Sickleforce), and around Trondheim itself (Hammerforce). This plan was quickly changed though, as it was felt that a direct assault on Trondheim would be far too risky and therefore only the northern and southern forces would be used.

To block the expected allied landings the Oberkommando der Wehrmacht ordered a Fallschirmjäger company to make a combat drop on the railway junction of Dombås in the north of the Gudbrandsdal valley. The force landed on 14 April and managed to block the rail and road network in Central Norway for five days before being forced to surrender to the Norwegian Army on 19 April.

A British vanguard force arrived at Åndalsnes on 12 April. The main landing of Sickleforce, consisting primarily of the British 148th Infantry Brigade and commanded by Major-General Bernard Paget, occurred on 17 April. The successful Norwegian mobilization in the area opened the opportunity for the British landings.

In the waning hours of 14 April, Mauriceforce, composed primarily of the British 146th Infantry Brigade and commanded by Major-General Adrian Carton de Wiart made their initial landings at the Norwegian port town of Namsos. During the trip the force had been transferred to destroyers instead of bulky transport ships due to the narrow waters of the fjord leading to Namsos; in the confusion of the transfer a great deal of their supplies and even the brigade commander were misplaced.

Another great problem for Mauriceforce was the lack of air support and effective anti-aircraft defences, something of which the Luftwaffe took full advantage. On 17 April the force moved forward from Namsos to positions around the village of Follafoss and the town of Steinkjer. French troops arrived at Namsos late on 19 April. On 20 April German aircraft bombed Namsos, destroying most of the houses in the town centre, and large portions of the supply storage for allied troops, leaving de Wiart without a base. Regardless, he moved 130 km (81 mi) inland to Steinkjer and linked up with the Norwegian 5th Division. Constant aerial harassment prevented any kind of offensive from taking place though, and on 21 April Mauriceforce was attacked by the German 181st Division from Trondheim. De Wiart was forced to fall back from these assaults, leaving Steinkjer for the Germans. On 21 and 22 April Steinkjer was bombed by the Luftwaffe, leaving four-fifths of the town in ruins and more than 2,000 people homeless. By 24 April Steinkjer and the surrounding areas had been occupied by the Germans.

=== End of the campaign in Central and South Norway ===
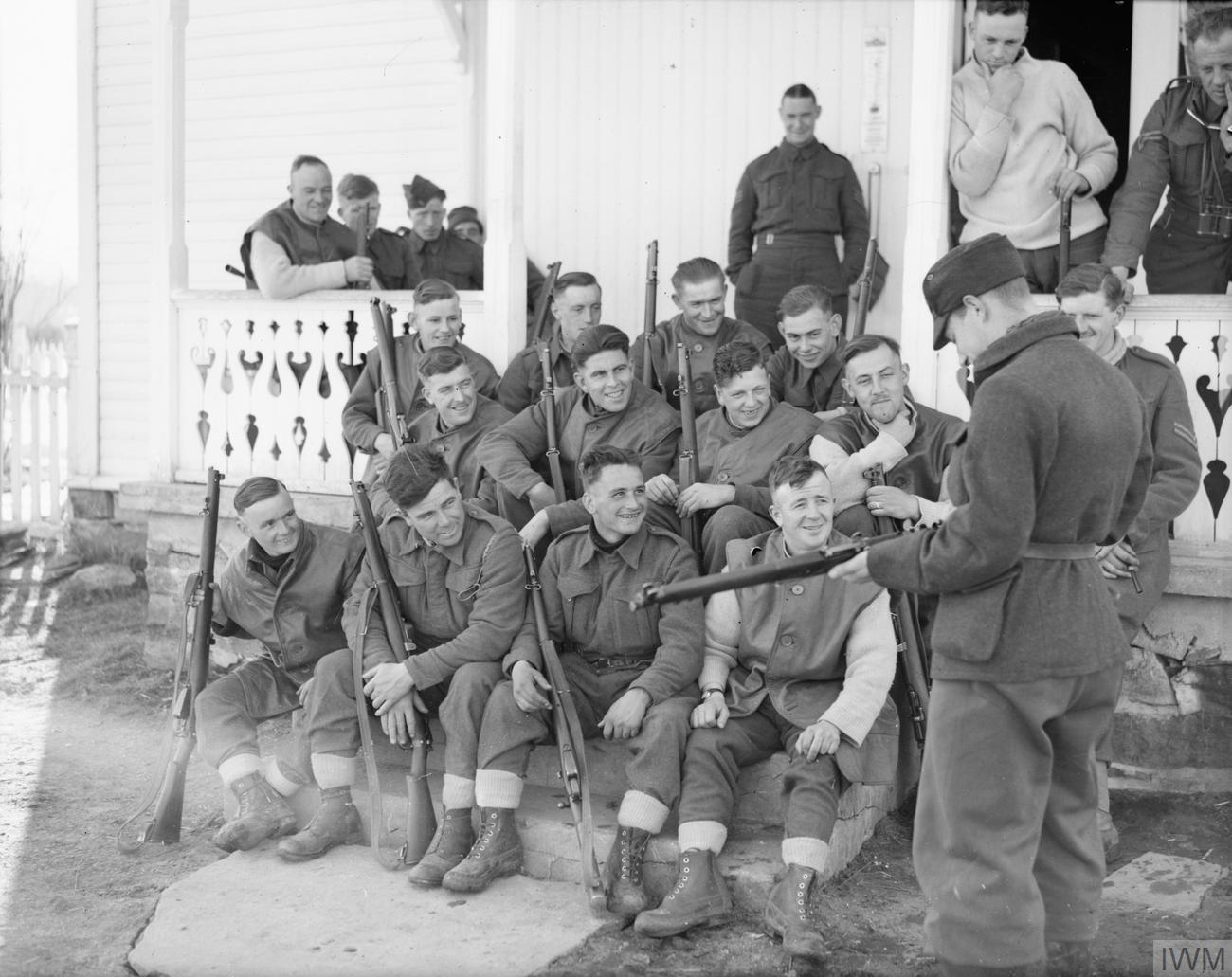
British soldiers of the 4th Lincolnshire Regiment at Skage after marching 90 km (56 mi) across the mountains to escape being cut off, April 1940. A Norwegian soldier is seen examining one of their rifles.

By 28 April, with both groups checked by the Germans, the Allied leadership decided to withdraw all British and French forces from the southern and central regions of Norway. The Allied retreat was covered by Norwegian forces, which were then demobilized to avoid having the soldiers taken prisoner by the Germans. On 30 April the Germans advancing from Oslo and Trondheim linked up.

On 28 and 29 April the undefended port town of Kristiansund had been heavily bombed by the Luftwaffe, as was the nearby port of Molde, which functioned as the headquarters of the Norwegian government and King. The town of Ålesund had also suffered heavily from German bombing during the last days of April.

Sickleforce managed to return to Åndalsnes and escape by 2 May at 02:00, only a few hours before the German 196th Division captured the port. The western Norwegian port had been subjected to heavy German bombing between 23 and 26 April, and had been burning until 27 April. The village of Veblungsnes and the area around Åndalsnes train station suffered particularly heavy damage. By the time the Germans arrived, some 80% of Åndalsnes lay in ruins. Mauriceforce, their convoys delayed by thick fog, were evacuated from Namsos on 2 May, though two of their rescue ships, the French destroyer Bison and the British destroyer Afridi were sunk by Junkers Ju 87 dive bombers.

Organized Norwegian military resistance in the central and southern parts of Norway ceased on 5 May, with the capitulation of the forces fighting at Hegra in Sør-Trøndelag and at Vinjesvingen in Telemark.

The failure of the central campaign is considered one of the direct causes of the Norway Debate, which resulted in the resignation of British Prime Minister Neville Chamberlain and the appointment of Winston Churchill to the office.

Having evacuated from Molde during German air attacks on 29 April, King Haakon VII and his government arrived in Tromsø in northern Norway by 1 May. For the remaining weeks of the Norwegian Campaign Tromsø was the de facto capital of Norway, as the headquarters of the King and cabinet.

=== Campaign in northern Norway ===
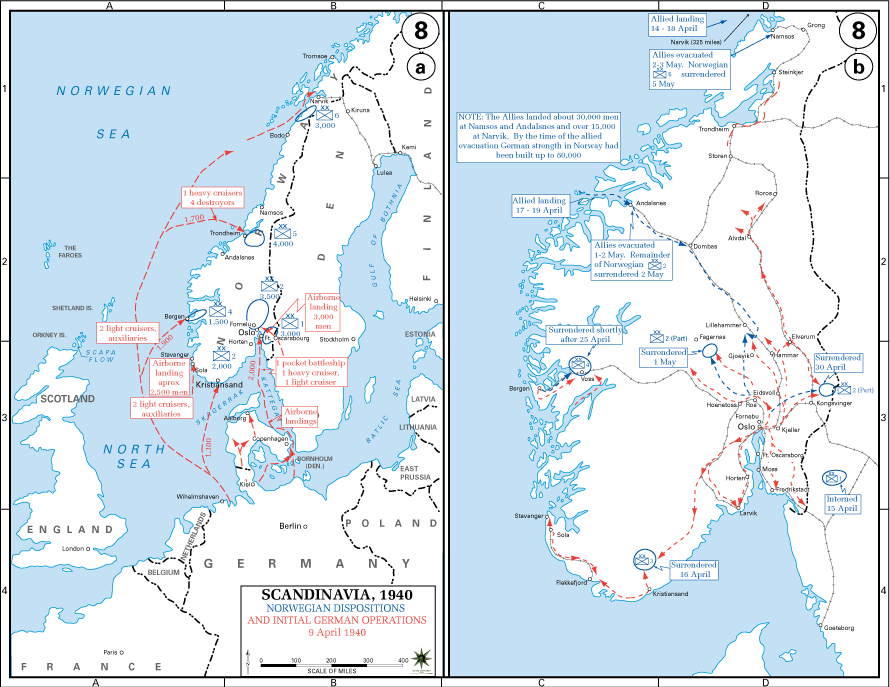
Initial German and Allied landings and operations in southern, central and northern Norway in April 1940

In northern Norway the Norwegian 6th division, commanded by General Carl Gustav Fleischer, faced the German invasion forces at Narvik. Following the German invasion General Fleischer assumed the position of commander-in-chief of all Norwegian forces in northern Norway. The Norwegian counter-offensive against the Germans at Narvik was hampered by Fleischer's decision to retain significant forces in Eastern Finnmark to guard against a possible Soviet attack in the far north.

Along with the Allied landings at Åndalsnes and Namsos, aimed against Trondheim, further forces were deployed to the north of Norway and assigned the task of recapturing Narvik. Like the campaign in the south, the Narvik expedition faced numerous obstacles.

One of the first problems faced by the Allies was that the command was not unified, or even truly organized. The naval forces in the area were led by Admiral of the Fleet William Boyle, 12th Earl of Cork who had been ordered to rid the area of the Germans as soon as possible. In contrast, the commander of the ground forces, Major-General Pierse Mackesy, was ordered not to land his forces in any area strongly held by the Germans and to avoid damaging populated areas. The two met on 15 April to determine the best course of action. Lord Cork argued for an immediate assault on Narvik and Mackesy countered that such a move would lead to heavy casualties for his attacking troops. Cork eventually conceded to Mackesy's viewpoint.

Mackesy's force was originally codenamed Avonforce, later Rupertforce. The force consisted of the 24th Guards Brigade, led by Brigadier William Fraser, and French and Polish units led by Brigadier Antoine Béthouart. The main force began landing at Harstad, a port town on the island of Hinnøya, on 14 April. The first German air attacks on Harstad began on 16 April, but anti-aircraft defences prevented serious damage until a raid on 20 May destroyed oil tanks and civilian houses and another raid on 23 May hit Allied shipping in the harbour.

On 15 April, the Allies scored a significant victory when the Royal Navy destroyers Brazen and Fearless, which were escorting the troop-carrying Convoy NP1, forced the German U-boat U-49 to surface and scuttle in the Vågsfjorden. Found floating around the sinking U-boat were documents detailing the dispositions, codes and operational orders of all U-boats in the Norwegian operational area, providing the Allies with an efficient and valuable tool when planning troop and supply convoys to the campaign in northern Norway.

After the Allied failure in Central Norway, more preparation was given to the northern forces. Air cover was provided by two squadrons of carrier-transported fighters operating from Bardufoss Air Station, the re-equipped No. 263 Squadron RAF with Gloster Gladiators and No. 46 Squadron RAF with Hawker Hurricanes.

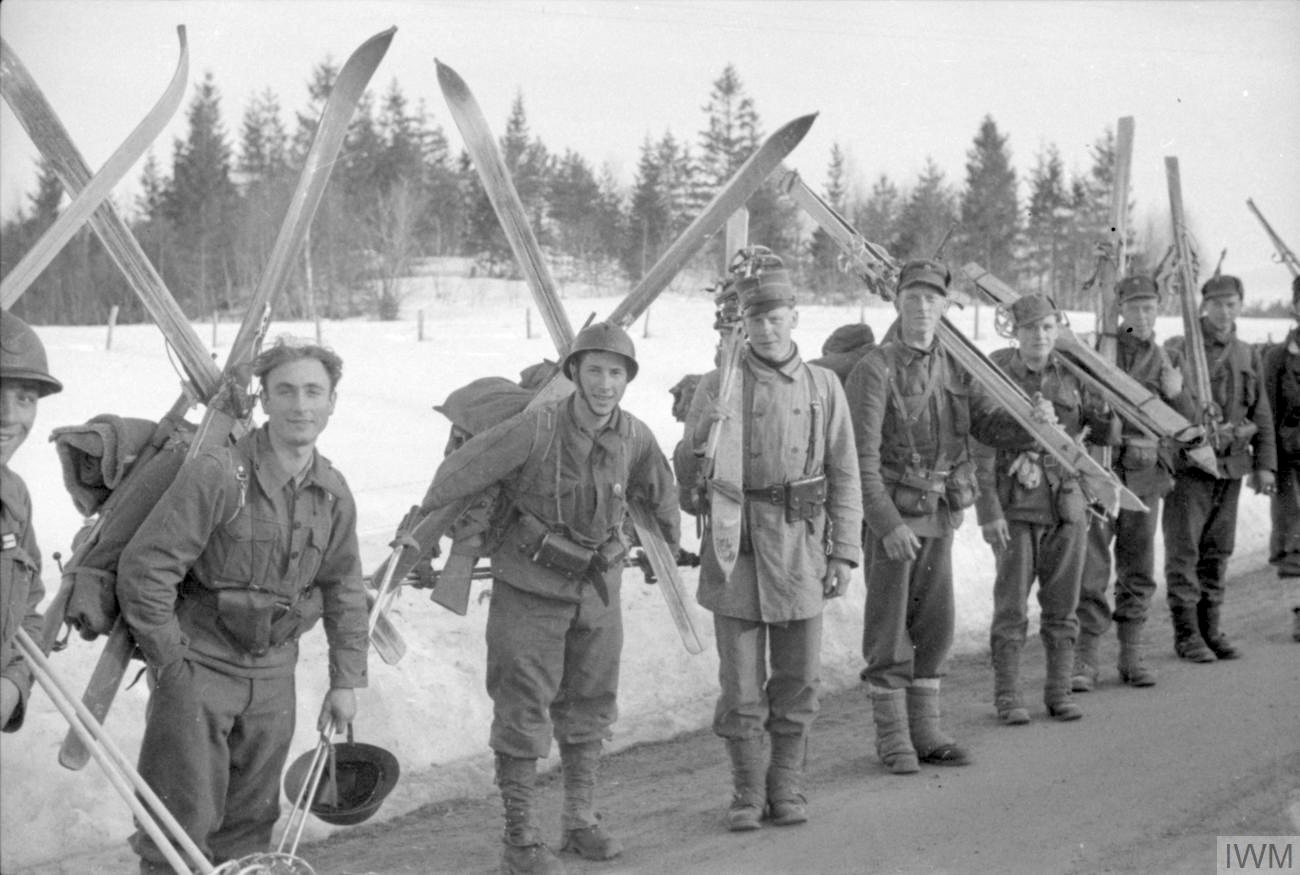
French and Norwegian ski troops, probably on the Narvik front

As part of the Allied counter-offensive in northern Norway, French forces made an amphibious landing at Bjerkvik on 13 May. The naval gunfire from supporting Allied warships destroyed most of the village and killed 14 civilians before the Germans were dislodged from Bjerkvik.

While the Norwegian and Allied forces were advancing at Narvik, German forces were moving swiftly northwards through Nordland to relieve Dietl's besieged troops. The captured Værnes Air Station near Trondheim was rapidly expanded and improved to provide the Luftwaffe with a base from which to support the Narvik sector. As the German forces moved northwards, they also gained control of the basic facilities at Hattfjelldal Airfield to support their bomber operations.

In late April, ten independent companies had been formed in Britain, commanded by Lieutenant Colonel Colin Gubbins. On 2 May, four of these companies were formed into "Scissorsforce", under Gubbins, and dispatched to forestall the Germans at Bodø, Mo i Rana and Mosjøen. Although they ambushed the leading German units south of Mosjøen they were outmatched by the German main body and were withdrawn to Bodø, which was to be defended by the 24th Guards Brigade.

As the 24th Guards Brigade moved to Bodø, the destroyer HMS Somali, which was carrying Brigadier Fraser, was bombed and was forced to return to Britain. Gubbins, with the acting rank of colonel, assumed command of the brigade. On 15 May the troop ship MS Chrobry carrying the 1st Irish Guards was bombed, with heavy casualties to the troops, and two days later the heavy cruiser HMS Effingham went aground while carrying much of the equipment of the 2nd South Wales Borderers. Both battalions returned to Harstad to reform and to be re-equipped before setting out again for Bodø.

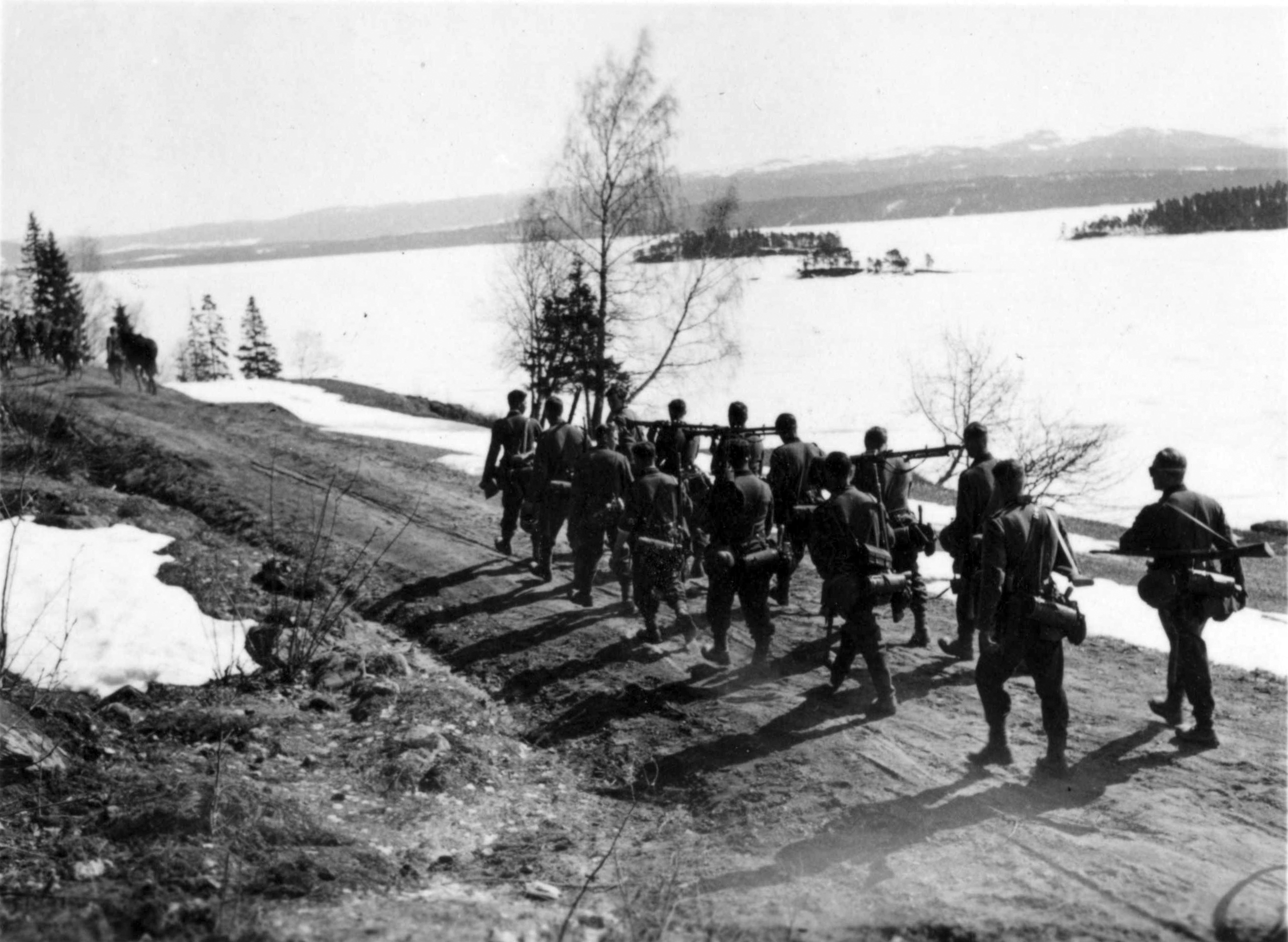
German Gebirgsjäger advancing northwards near Snåsa

As the Germans advanced northward from a railhead at Mosjøen, the garrison of Mo i Rana (a mixed force based on the 1st Scots Guards) withdrew on 18 May, too precipitately in Gubbins's opinion. The commanding officer of the Scots Guards, Lieutenant Colonel Thomas Byrnand Trappes-Lomax, continued to retreat despite orders to hold successive positions which, with the delayed arrival of the rest of the brigade, left Gubbins no time to prepare a defensive position at Storjord. The brigade withdrew under heavy pressure across Skjerstad Fjord on 25 May, covered by a rearguard from the 1st Irish Guards and several of the Independent Companies under Lieutenant Colonel Hugh Stockwell.

In the evening of 27 May Bodø was bombed and strafed by the Luftwaffe. The bombing raid destroyed the recently constructed improvised airstrip, the radio station and 420 of the town's 760 buildings, killing 15 people and leaving a further 5,000 homeless in the process.

Gubbins's force was evacuated from Bodø from 30 May to 2 June. During these three days, low cloud prevented the Luftwaffe interfering. The improvised air strip which had been hit during the 27 May air raid fell into German hands, providing the Germans with an air base much closer to the Narvik fighting, and was of great significance for their continued advance northwards.

On 28 May, two French and one Norwegian battalion attacked and recaptured Narvik from the Germans. To the south of the city Polish troops advanced eastwards along the Beisfjord. Other Norwegian troops were pushing the Germans back towards the Swedish border near Bjørnfjell. However, the German invasion of France and the Low Countries had immensely altered the overall situation of the war and the importance of Norway was considerably lessened. On 25 May, three days before the recapture of Narvik, the Allied commanders had received orders to evacuate from Norway. The attack on the city was in part carried out to mask from the Germans the Allies' intention of leaving Norway. Shortly after the 28 May Allied recapture of Narvik, the city was bombed and heavily damaged by the Luftwaffe.

=== Allied withdrawal and Norwegian capitulation ===
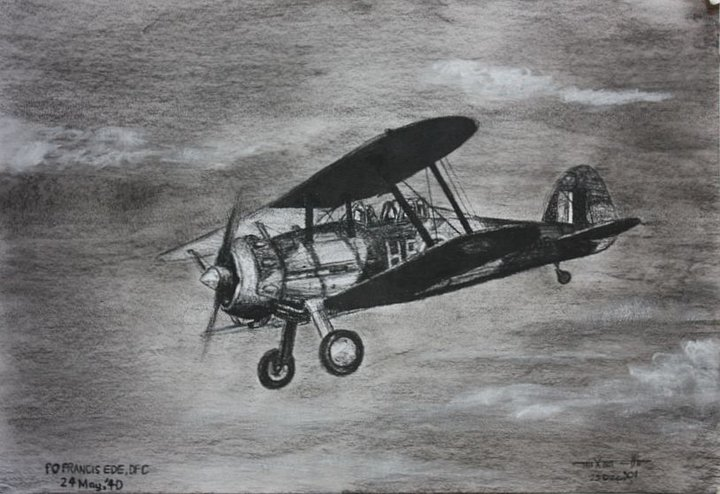
Artist's impression of the No. 263 Squadron RAF Gloster Gladiator flown by Bermudian Flying Officer Herman Francis Grant "Baba" Ede, DFC, on the 24th May, 1940. Ede died in the sinking of HMS Glorious

Operation Alphabet, the general Allied retreat from Norway, had been approved on 24 May. Among those who argued against evacuating Norway was Winston Churchill, who later expressed that the decision had been a mistake. The Norwegian authorities were only informed of the decision on 1 June. After a meeting on 7 June at which the decision to carry on the fight abroad was made, King Haakon VII, Crown Prince Olav and the Norwegian cabinet left Norway on the British cruiser Devonshire and went into exile in the United Kingdom. Without supplies from the Allies the Norwegian Army would soon have been unable to continue the fight. Both the King and the Crown Prince had considered the possibility of remaining in Norway, but had been persuaded by the British diplomat Cecil Dormer to instead follow the government into exile. The Crown Prince suggested that he should remain and assist the Administrative Council in easing the effects of the occupation, but due to the King's old age it was decided that they both had to go into exile, to avoid complications should the King die while abroad. By 8 June, after destroying rail lines and port facilities, all Allied troops had been evacuated. The Germans had launched Operation Juno, sending Scharnhorst and Gneisenau to relieve pressure on the Narvik garrison. After discovering the evacuation, they shifted the mission to attacking Allied shipping and subsequently sank two British destroyers and the aircraft carrier Glorious. Before the British warships were sunk, however, the destroyer Acasta torpedoed and damaged Scharnhorst. Shortly after the encounter, the British submarine HMS Clyde intercepted the German ships and torpedoed Gneisenau, causing severe damage.

The Norwegian forces on the mainland capitulated to the Germans on 10 June 1940. Units fighting on the front had been ordered to disengage in the early hours of 8 June. Fighting ceased at 24:00 on 9 June. The formal capitulation agreement for forces fighting in mainland Norway was signed at the Britannia Hotel in Trondheim at 17:00 on 10 June 1940. Lieutenant Colonel Ragnvald Roscher Nielsen signed for the Norwegian forces, Colonel Erich Buschenhagen for the German side. A capitulation agreement for the Norwegian forces fighting at Narvik was also signed the same day, at Bjørnfjell. The signatories of this agreement, the last local capitulation of Norwegian troops during the campaign, were General Eduard Dietl for the Germans, and Lieutenant Colonel Harald Wrede Holm for the Norwegians. The 62-day campaign made Norway the country to withstand a German invasion for the longest period of time, aside from the Soviet Union.

== Occupation ==
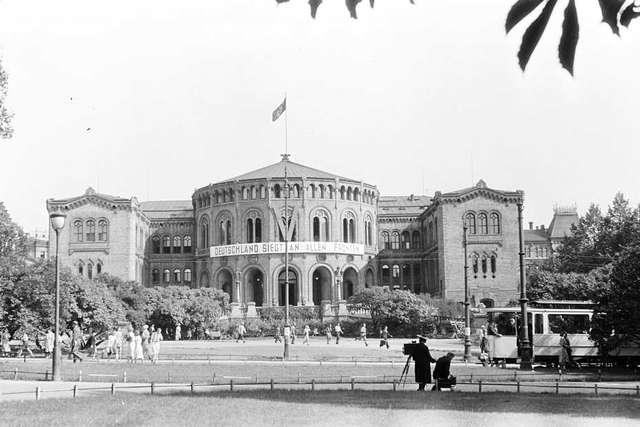
The Parliament of Norway Building in 1941, with the Swastika flag flying and a Nazi slogan across the front of the building reading Deutschland siegt an allen Fronten

With the capitulation of Norway's mainland army a German occupation of the country began. Although the regular Norwegian armed forces in mainland Norway laid down their arms in June 1940, there was a fairly prominent resistance movement, which proved increasingly efficient during the later years of occupation. The resistance to the German occupation began in the autumn of 1940, steadily gaining strength and becoming better organized. Despite the Gestapo infiltrating and destroying many of the early organizations, the resistance movement survived and grew. The last year of the war saw an increase in sabotage actions by the exile government-aligned Norwegian resistance organization Milorg, although the organization's main goal was to retain intact guerilla forces to aid an Allied invasion of Norway. In addition to Milorg, many independent, mostly communist, resistance groups operated in occupied Norway, attacking German targets without coordinating with the exiled Norwegian authorities.

The civilian side of the German occupation of Norway was organized through the establishment of the Reichskommissariat Norwegen, led from 24 April by Josef Terboven. The Germans attempted to make the exiled Norwegian authorities irrelevant, especially targeting the King. Weeks after the end of the Norwegian Campaign the Germans pressured the presidency of the Norwegian parliament to issue a request that Haakon VII abdicate. On 3 July Haakon VII turned down the request, and on 8 July gave a speech on BBC Radio proclaiming his answer. "The King's No", as it became known, encouraged resistance to the occupation and the Norwegian collaborators. The Administrative Council, appointed by the Norwegian Supreme Court on 15 April to stand in for the Norwegian government in the occupied territories, functioned until 25 September. After that date the Norwegian partner of the occupying Germans was the fascist Quisling regime, in one form or another.

The Royal Norwegian Navy and Royal Norwegian Air Force (RNoAF) were re-established in Britain – based on the remnants of forces saved from the Norwegian Campaign. The forces soon saw extensive combat in the convoy-battles of the North Atlantic and in the air-war over Europe. The ranks of the Navy and Air Force were swollen by a steady trickle of refugees making their way out of occupied Norway, and their equipment brought up to standard by British and American aircraft and ships. From a force of 15 ships in June 1940, the Royal Norwegian Navy had expanded to 58 warships by the end of the Second World War in Europe. The ships were manned by around 7,000 crew members. In all 118 warships had been under Norwegian command at one time or another during the war years.

Norwegian squadrons flew with the RAF Fighter and Coastal Commands. The Norwegian-manned 331 Squadron and 332 Squadron operated Hawker Hurricane and Supermarine Spitfire fighter aircraft. The naval 330 Squadron and 333 Squadron flew Northrop N-3PB patrol bombers, Consolidated PBY Catalina and Short Sunderland flying boats and de Havilland Mosquito fighter bombers. Individual Norwegians flew with British air units. In November 1944 the Royal Norwegian Naval Air Service and the Norwegian Army Air Service, having been under a unified command since March 1941, were amalgamated to form the RNoAF. At the end of the war some 2,700 personnel served in the RNoAF.

A c. 4,000 strong Norwegian Army was also re-established in Scotland. However, with the exception of a small number of special forces, it saw little action for the rest of the war. A reinforced company from the Scotland-based Norwegian Army participated in the liberation of Finnmark during the winter of 1944–45. Finnmark and the northern parts of Troms county had been forcibly evacuated by the Germans in a scorched earth operation following the Petsamo–Kirkenes Offensive by the Red Army against occupied Finnmark in October 1944. The offensive had captured the north-eastern town of Kirkenes from the occupying German forces. After the arrival of the 300 troops from Scotland, further troops were moved in from Sweden and mobilized locally. At the end of the war, the Norwegian forces in Finnmark totalled 3,000. In the course of this operation, there were some minor skirmishes with German rear guards and patrols.

In neutral Sweden there was also a Norwegian build-up of forces in the last two years of the war through the so-called "police troops" established with the support of Swedish authorities. The term "police" served as a cover up for what in reality was pure military training of a force mustering around 13,000 well trained and equipped troops by VE-day. In 1945 around 1,300 "police troops" took part in the Liberation of Finnmark.

Aside from the regular Norwegian forces, the main armed resistance movement in Norway, the exile government-controlled Milorg, fielded some 40,000 combatants at the end of the war. In November 1941 Milorg had been declared by the exiled Norwegian government to be the fourth branch of the Norwegian Armed Forces.

== Casualties and material losses ==
=== German ===
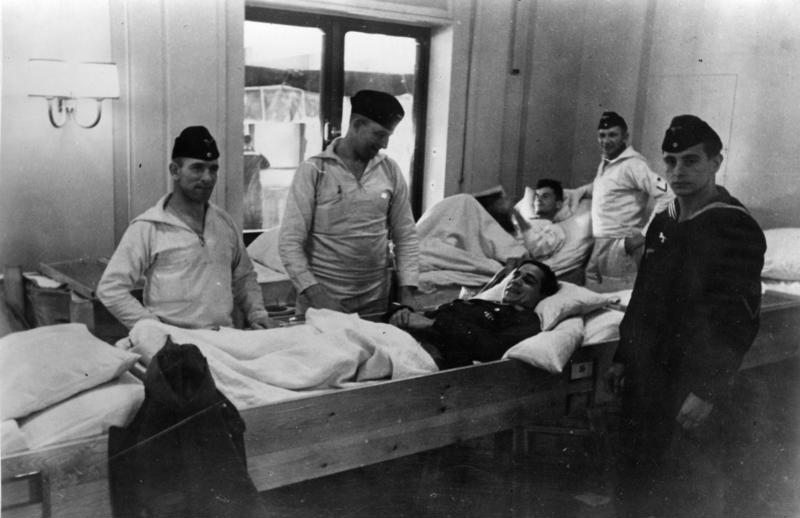
Germans wounded at Narvik being repatriated to Germany on board the hospital ship Wilhelm Gustloff

The official German casualties for the Norwegian Campaign totalled 5,296. Of these 1,317 were killed on land, while 2,375 were lost at sea. 1,604 were listed as wounded.

The German losses at sea were heavy, with the sinking of one of the Kriegsmarine's two heavy cruisers, two of its six light cruisers, 10 of its 20 destroyers and six U-boats. With several more ships severely damaged, the German surface fleet had only three cruisers and four destroyers operational in the aftermath of the Norwegian Campaign. Two torpedo boats and 15 light naval units were also lost during the campaign. Two German battleships and two cruisers were damaged during the campaign.

Official German sources give the number of German aircraft lost during the Norwegian Campaign as 90, with other estimates by historian François Kersaudy ranging as high as 240.

In transport ships and merchant vessels, the Germans lost 21 ships at 111,700 tons, around 10% of what they had available at the time.

=== Norwegian and Allied ===
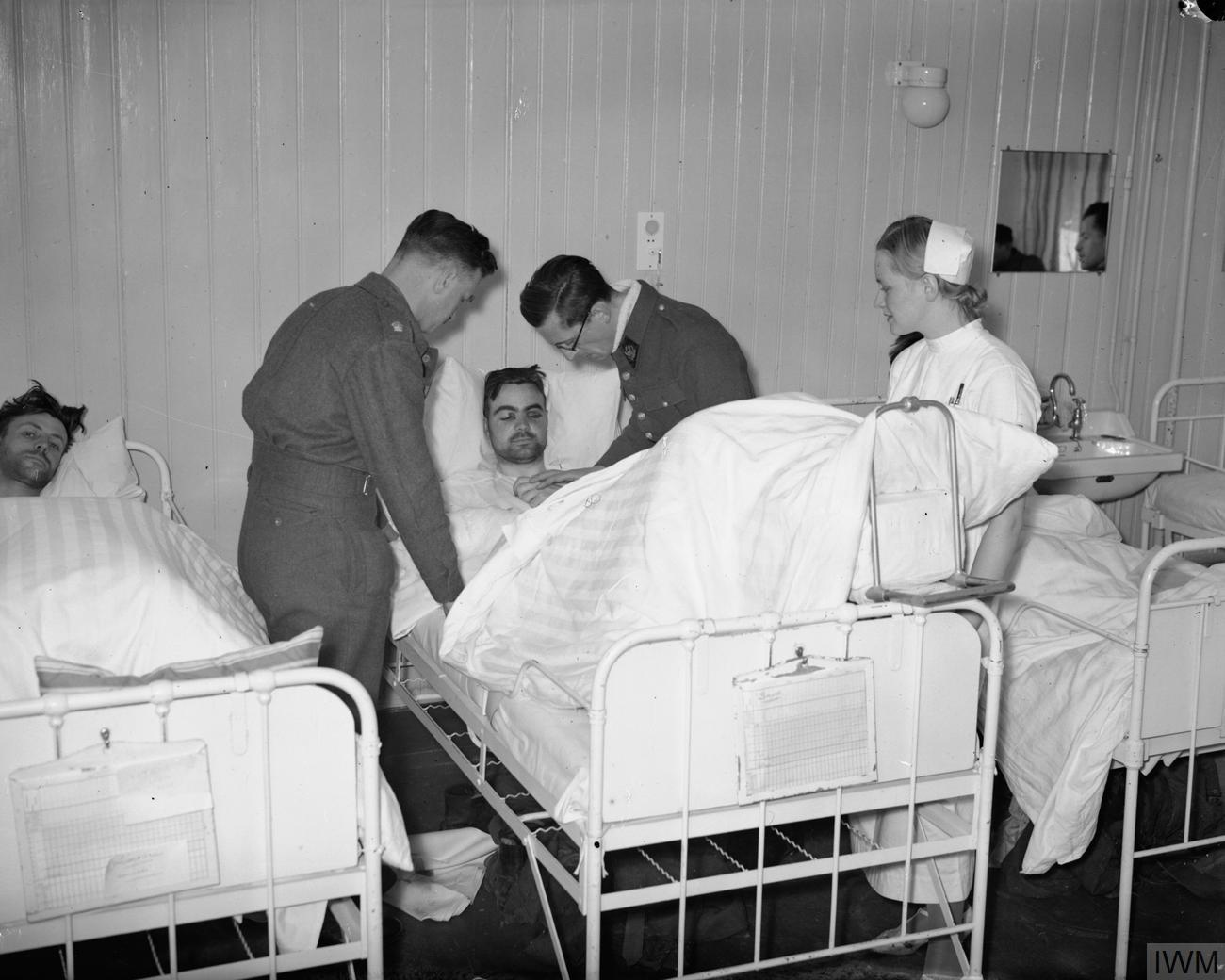
Wounded British and French soldiers being treated at a hospital in Namsos by British and French medical officers and a Norwegian nurse

The Norwegian and Allied casualties of the Norwegian Campaign totalled around 6,602. The British lost 1,869 killed, wounded and missing on land and approximately 2,500 at sea, while the French and Polish lost 533 killed, wounded and missing. On the Norwegian side there were around 1,700 casualties, of whom 860 were killed. Some 400 Norwegian civilians were also killed, mostly in German bombing raids. Around 60 of the civilians killed were shot by German soldiers during the fighting in eastern Norway, many in summary executions.

On the naval side of the Norwegian casualties, the Royal Norwegian Navy, fielding 121 mostly outdated ships at the outset of the German invasion, was virtually wiped out during the campaign. Only 15 warships, including a captured German fishing trawler, with some 600 men had managed to evacuate to the United Kingdom by the end of the fighting. The remaining Norwegian naval vessels were sunk in action, scuttled by their own crews, or captured by the Germans. Among the warships sunk in action during the campaign were two coastal defence ships and two destroyers. Seven torpedo boats were also sunk or scuttled, while the remaining ten were captured by the Germans. Only one of the nine Norwegian submarines managed to escape to the United Kingdom, the other eight being scuttled or captured. Some 50 captured Norwegian naval ships were over time pressed into service by the Kriegsmarine.

The British lost one aircraft carrier, two cruisers, seven destroyers and a submarine but with their much larger fleet could absorb the losses to a much greater degree than Germany. HMS Vandyck was an Armed Boarding Vessel, she was a reserve ship during the Allied evacuation from Northern Norway in 1940, and was supposed to wait and see if there were any stragglers. Something went wrong with the last radio transmissions and she was left outside Andøya and did not show up when the last convoy left. Shortly afterwards she was found and bombed by FW200 Condor aircraft from KG40 on 10 June.

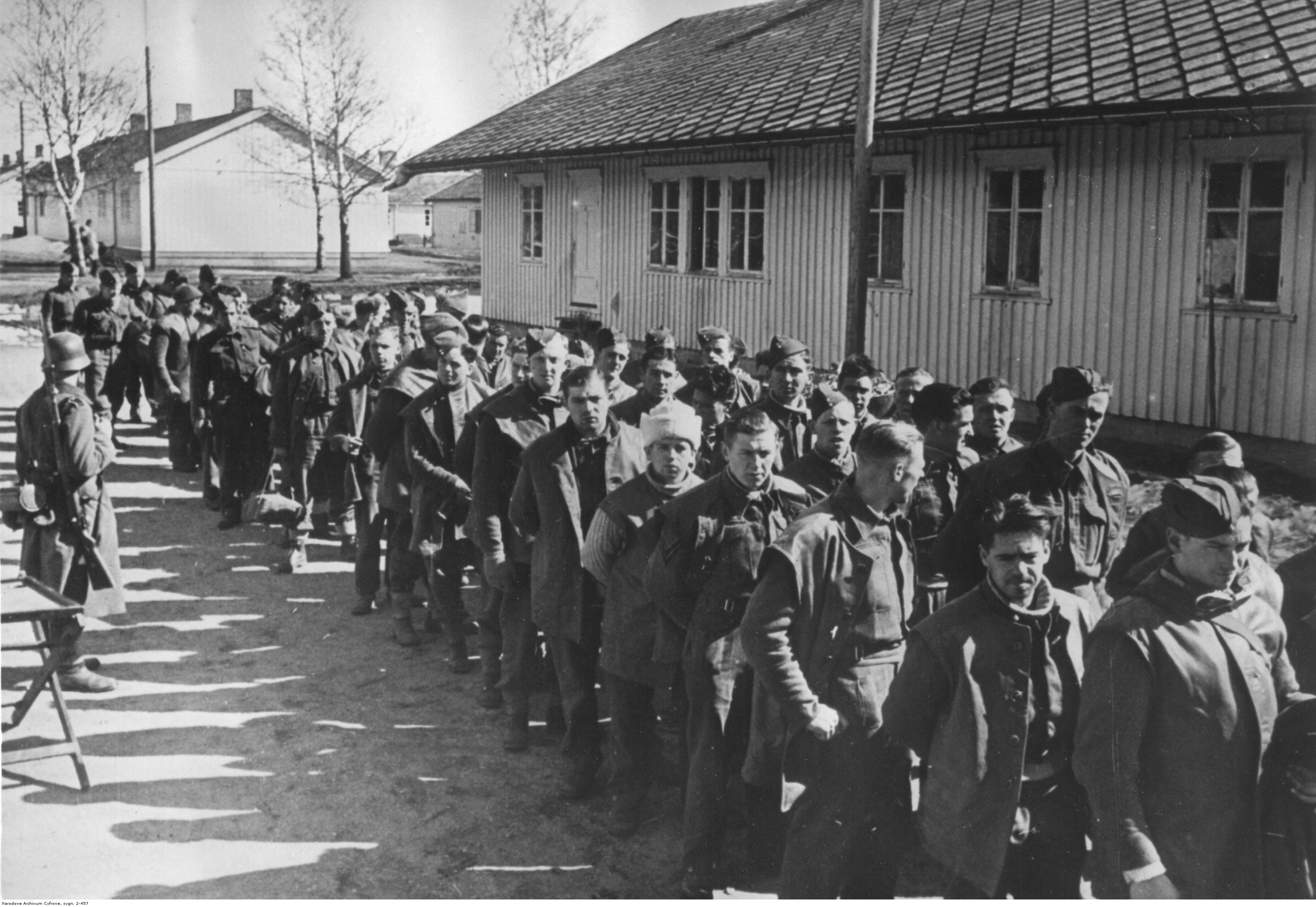
British prisoners of war in Trondheim, May 1940

The French Navy lost the destroyer Bison and a submarine during the campaign, and a cruiser severely damaged. The exiled Polish Navy lost the destroyer Grom and the submarine Orzeł.

While the British lost 112 aircraft during the campaign, the Norwegians lost all their aircraft except a small number that were successfully evacuated to the United Kingdom or flown to neutral Finland.

The combined total loss of merchants ships and transports for the Allies and Norwegians was around 70 ships.

== Analysis ==
The operation as planned was a decisive victory for Germany. Both Denmark and Norway were occupied. Surprise was almost complete, particularly in Denmark.

At sea the invasion proved a temporary setback. For the Kriegsmarine the campaign led to heavy losses, leaving the Kriegsmarine with a surface force of one heavy cruiser, two light cruisers and four destroyers operational. This left the navy weakened during the summer months when Hitler was pursuing plans for an invasion of Britain.

The greatest cost of the campaign on land came in the need to keep most of the invasion troops in Norway for occupation duties away from the fronts. On the whole, the campaign was successful with great benefits for the victor.

Through the Norwegian government's Nortraship system, the Allies also gained the services of the Norwegian merchant navy, the fourth largest in the world. The 1,028-ship strong Nortraship was established on 22 April 1940 at a government meeting at Stuguflåten in Romsdal. The Nortraship fleet consisted of some 85% of the pre-war Norwegian merchant fleet, the remaining 15% having been in Norway when the Germans invaded and been unable to escape. The Nortraship vessels were crewed by 27,000 sailors. In total 43 free Norwegian ships were sunk during the Norwegian Campaign, while another 29 were interned by the neutral Swedes. Nortraship gave the Norwegian government-in-exile economic independence and a basis for continued resistance from abroad.

The Allies achieved a partial success at Narvik. The Germans had destroyed much of the port facilities there before their loss of the city on 28 May. Shipping from the port was stopped for a period of six months, although the Allies had believed it would be out of operation for a year.

The German occupation of Norway was to prove a thorn in the side of the Allies during the next few years. Bombers based at Sola had a round trip of about 920 km to Rattray Head in north-east Scotland, instead of a round trip of about 1,400 km from the nearest airfield on German soil (the island of Sylt), while the east of Scotland and coastal shipping suffered from bombing raids, most from Norway, until 1943. After the fall of Norway, Scotland (especially the fleet bases at Scapa Flow and Rosyth) were seen as much more vulnerable to a diversionary assault by air- and sea-borne troops. German commerce raiders used Norway as a staging base to reach the North Atlantic. After Germany invaded the Soviet Union in 1941, air bases in Norway were also used to interdict the Allied Arctic convoys there, inflicting painful losses to shipping.

== In fiction ==
- The 1942 film They Raid by Night is set in Norway just after the campaign.
- The 1942 film The Day Will Dawn is largely set in Norway just before and just after the invasion.
- The invasion and the following occupation are depicted in the John Steinbeck novel The Moon Is Down, although neither Germany nor Norway are referred to by name.
- Paul Milner, a major character in the television crime drama series Foyle's War that takes place in wartime Britain, served in the Norwegian Campaign and injured his leg there.
- The adventure novel Biggles Defies the Swastika by Captain W. E. Johns portrays the protagonist Squadron Leader Bigglesworth's (Biggles) adventures while trying to escape from Norway after getting stuck in the country during the German invasion. The novel contains several references to the occupation of Oslo, the battles at Narvik and the British naval response to the campaign.
- The 1993 Norwegian film The Last Lieutenant is set in Oslo and Telemark around the Norwegian Campaign. It is based on the actions of Second Lieutenant Thor O. Hannevig, a reservist officer in the Norwegian Army.
- Into the White is a Norwegian fiction film (2011) about German and British aircrew members who encounter each other after both aircraft were shot down in the Norwegian mountains in late April 1940.
- The 2008 novel The Odin Mission by James Holland is a British book about a group of British, French and Norwegian troops attempting to reach the retreating Allied lines while protecting a civilian with crucial information and being hunted by German mountain troops.
- The 2016 Norwegian film The King's Choice is based on the true story about three dramatic days in April 1940, where the King of Norway is presented with an unimaginable ultimatum from the German armed forces: surrender or die.
- In the 2018 video game Battlefield V, the Norwegian Campaign was featured in multiplayer, having 2 maps with one based on the Battle of Narvik and the other set in the mountain ranges of Norway, where the 2 factions fighting were the armed forces of the United Kingdom and the German Wehrmacht

== See also ==
- List of Norwegian military equipment of World War II
- List of German military equipment of World War II
- List of British military equipment of World War II
- List of French military equipment of World War II (also used by Polish troops in Norway)

== Bibliography ==
- Benkow, Jo; Ole Kristian Grimnes (1990). Vendepunkt: 9. april i vår bevissthet (in Norwegian). Oslo: Cappelen. ISBN 82-02-12700-9.
- Derry, T. K. (2004) [1952]. Butler, J. R. M. (ed.). The Campaign in Norway (online scan). History of the Second World War, Military Series (Facs. repr. Naval & Military Press, Uckfield ed.). London: HMSO. ISBN 978-1-84574-057-3 – via Hyperwar Foundation.
- Dildy, Doug (2007). Denmark and Norway 1940: Hitler's Boldest Operation. Oxford: Osprey Publishing. ISBN 978-1-84603-117-5.
- Haarr, Geirr H. (2010). The Battle for Norway – April–June 1940. Barnsley, UK: Seaforth Publishing. ISBN 978-1-84832-057-4.
- Haarr, Geirr H. (2009). The German invasion of Norway – April 1940. Barnsley: Seaforth Publishing. ISBN 978-1-84832-032-1.
- Hafsten, Bjørn; Ulf Larsstuvold; Bjørn Olsen; Sten Stenersen (2005). Flyalarm – luftkrigen over Norge 1939–1945 (in Norwegian) (2nd, revised ed.). Oslo: Sem og Stenersen AS. ISBN 82-7046-074-5.
- Haga, Arnfinn (1999). Valdres 1940 (in Norwegian). Oslo: Cappelen. ISBN 82-02-18465-7.
- Hansteen, Wilhelm (1971). Operasjonene til lands på Vestlandet og i Hallingdal og Numedal (in Norwegian). Oslo: Forsvarets krigshistoriske avdeling – Gyldendal norsk forlag. ISBN 82-05-00122-7.
- Hauge, Andreas (1995). Kampene i Norge 1940 (in Norwegian). Vol. 1. Sandefjord: Krigshistorisk Forlag. ISBN 82-993369-0-2.
- Hauge, Andreas (1995). Kampene i Norge 1940 (in Norwegian). Vol. 2. Sandefjord: Krigshistorisk Forlag. ISBN 82-993369-0-2.
- Lunde, Henrik O. (2009). Hitler's pre-emptive war: The Battle for Norway, 1940. Newbury: Casemate Publishers. ISBN 978-1-932033-92-2.
- Mølmen, Øystein (1998). Raumabanen/Romsdalen, Lesja og Dovre: kamphandlingene i april 1940 (in Norwegian). Raumabanens kulturlag. ISBN 82-994722-0-2.
- Nøkleby, Berit (1996). 'Skutt blir den...'. Tysk bruk av dødsstraff i Norge 1940–45 (in Norwegian). Oslo: Gyldendal. ISBN 82-05-22173-1.
- Østbye, Gudbrand (1963). Krigen i Norge 1940. Operasjonene i Nord-Trøndelag (in Norwegian). Oslo: Forsvarets Krigshistoriske Avdeling / Gyldendal.
- Rohwer, J. (2005). Chronology of the War at Sea 1939–1945. Naval Institute Press. ISBN 978-1-59114-119-8.
- Sandvik, Trygve (1965). Krigen i Norge 1940. Operasjonene til lands i Nord-Norge 1940 (in Norwegian). Vol. 1. Oslo: Forsvarets Krigshistoriske Avdeling / Gyldendal.
- Sandvik, Trygve (1965). Krigen i Norge 1940. Operasjonene til lands i Nord-Norge 1940 (in Norwegian). Vol. 2. Oslo: Forsvarets Krigshistoriske Avdeling / Gyldendal.
- Shirer, William L (1990). The Rise and Fall of the Third Reich: A History of Nazi Germany. Simon and Schuster. ISBN 0-671-72868-7.
- Skodvin, Magne (1991). Norsk historie 1939–1945: krig og okkupasjon (in Norwegian). Oslo: Samlaget. ISBN 82-521-3491-2.
- Weal, John (2012). He 111 Kampfgeschwader in the West. Oxford: Osprey Publishing. ISBN 978-1-84908-670-7.
- Wilkinson, Peter; Astley, Joan Bright (1993). Gubbins and SOE. London: Leo Cooper. ISBN 0-85052-556-X.
