= 1st Division (Norway) =

- Active: 1916 – 5 May 1940; May 1952 – 1 January 1963
- Country: Norway
- Type: Infantry
- Size: Division
- Garrison/HQ: Halden, Norway (1916–1940); Ski, Norway (1952–1963)
- Engagements: World War II: Norwegian campaign; Battle of Vinjesvingen

Commanders
- Notable Commanders: Major Carl Johan Erichsen

The 1st Division (Norwegian: 1. divisjon) is a former unit in the Norwegian Army, responsible for the defence of Eastern Norway along with the 2nd Division.

== History ==
The history of the Norwegian 1st Division can be traced back to the reorganization in 1911 of the 1st Akershusiske Infantry Brigade into the combined arms 1st Brigade. In 1916, this brigade was reclassified as the 1st Division, having evolved into what would be considered a division by European definitions.

=== First World War ===
During the First World War, the 1st Division was activated to ensure Norwegian neutrality. Training was intensified with several large-scale exercises and units performed guard duty at important sites such as arsenals and industrial facilities.

=== Second World War ===
In the 1940 German invasion of Norway the Norwegian 1st Division, commanded by Major General Carl Johan Erichsen, was responsible for defending the land areas on both side of the Oslofjord against the invading troops. The division was not well prepared for the situation, the troops were not mobilized and the division's stores depots in Fredrikstad were captured by the Germans already on 9 April. The 1st Division was responsible for Fossum Fortress (Høytorp Fort and Trøgstad Fort) in Askim and the Greåker Fort in Sarpsborg. The Germans started attacking on 12 April, and there were battles at bridges crossing Glomma (Fossum Bridge, Langenes Railway Bridge, and a bridge near Kykkelsrud Power Station). Fossum Fortress was surrendered on 13 April. On 14 April a large number of troops in Østfold, around 3,000 men, chose to cross the border to Sweden instead of continuing the fight or surrendering to the German troops.

At Kongsberg two bataillons surrendered without fighting, while some officers and soldiers disagreed with the surrender and defended the Vinje district for about one month.

=== Post-WWII ===
The 1st Division was re-established in May 1952 with headquarters in Ski, tasked with the defence of South Norway. The 1st Division was disbanded by 1 January 1963, its personnel dispersed and its tasks reassigned to the District Command Østlandet.
