= Norwegian Army Command Germany =

Former Norwegian military unit operating in Germany

Norwegian Army Command Germany Tysklandskommandoen
- Active: 1946–1953
- Disbanded: 18 June 1953
- Country: Norway
- Branch: Norwegian Army
- Type: Staff
- Size: 200
- Part of: Norwegian Army High Command
- Headquarters: Oslo (1946); Oerlinghausen (1947–1948); Neumünster (1948–1950); Rendsburg (1950-1953)

The Norwegian Army Command Germany (Norwegian: Tysklandskommandoen) was in charge of the Norwegian contribution to the occupation of the British Zone in Germany, which with the creation of NATO also become a defence force. It was active from the fall of 1946 to the summer of 1953 and represented the Norwegian Army High Command with regards to both the Independent Norwegian Brigade Group in Germany and the British Army of the Rhine. With changing brigades every 6 months the command represented the continuity in the Norwegian presence in Germany.

== Commanders ==
Name	Term began	Term ended
Major General Wilhelm von Tangen Hansteen	1 September 1946	30 September 1948
Major General Ragnvald Roscher Nielsen	1 October 1948	31 August 1949
Major General Arne Dagfin Dahl	1 September 1949	31 October 1950
Major General Hans Reidar Holtermann	1 November 1950	30 April 1952
Major General Bjørn Olafsøn Christophersen	1 May 1952	18 June 1953

== See also ==
- Independent Norwegian Brigade Group in Germany
- Allied-occupied Germany

== Sources and Notes ==
- Tysklandsbrigaden, a veterans' homepage.
- Agreement relating to the participation of a Norwegian brigade group in the occupation of the British Zone in Germany.
