= Ragnvald Roscher Nielsen =

Ragnvald Roscher Nielsen (21 December 1891 – 8 January 1979) was a Norwegian military officer, born in Fredrikshald. He served at the general staff from 1915 to 1930 and from 1938 to 1940. He was given the task to negotiate with the Germans on the armistice in 1940. From 1942 to 1945 he was a prisoner-of-war in German custody. He was a major general in the Norwegian Army from 1945, served as head of Distriktskommando Vestlandet and commander at Bergenhus Fortress until 1952. He was in charge of the Norwegian Army Command Germany from 1948 to 1949. He was decorated Commander of the Order of St. Olav in 1961.
