= Carl Johan Erichsen =

Norwegian military officer (1879–1949)

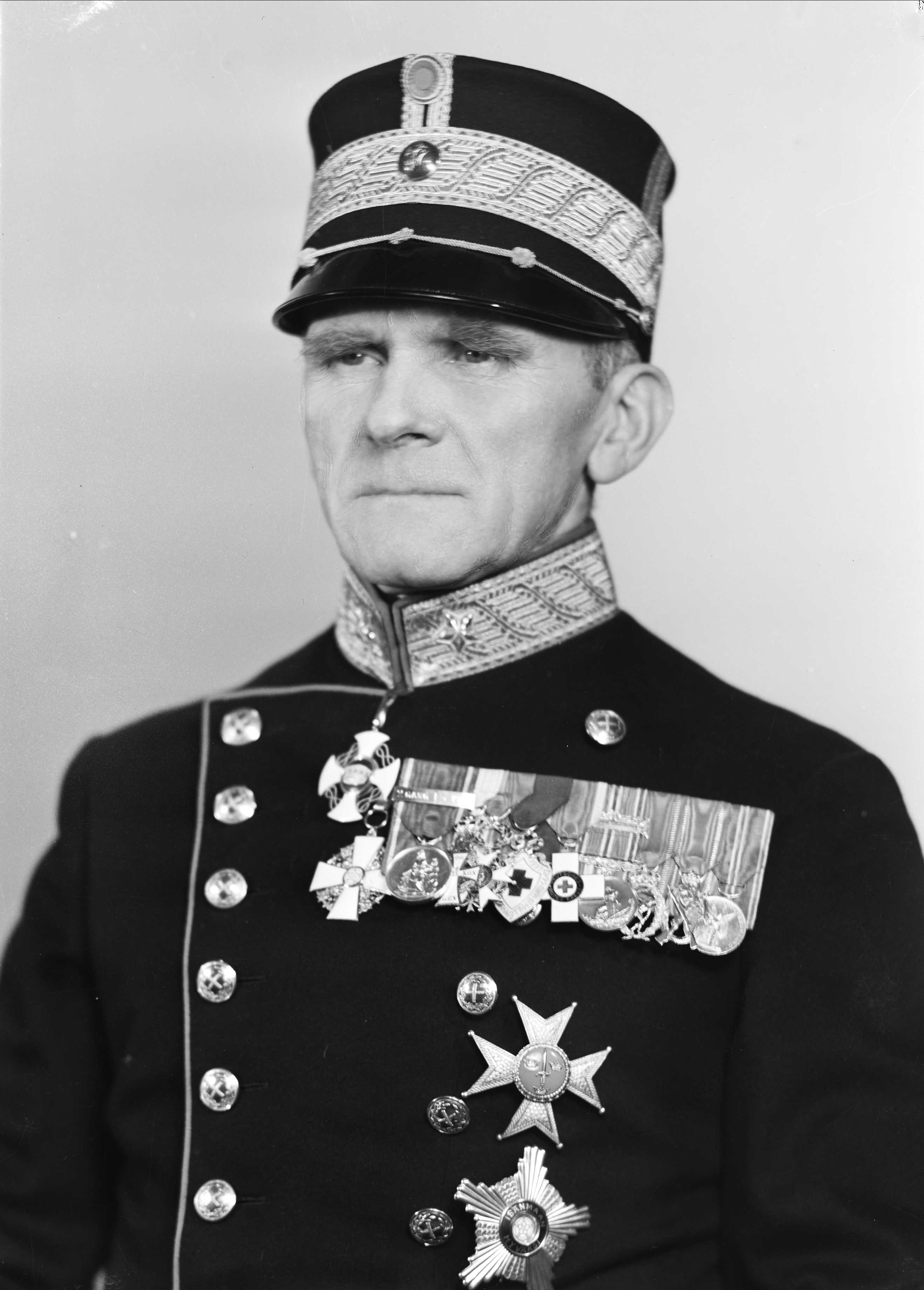
- Born: 14 September 1879; Kristiania, Norway
- Died: 10 November 1949 (aged 70)
- Occupation: military officer
- Awards: Knight of the Danish Order of the Dannebrog; Commander of the Order of the Crown of Italy; Knight of the French Legion of Honour; Knight, First Class of the Swedish Order of the Sword; Knight, First Class of the Order of the White Rose of Finland

Carl Johan Erichsen (14 September 1879 – 10 November 1949) was a Norwegian military officer.

== Personal life ==
Erichsen was born in Kristiania, a son of Hans Anton Erichsen and Karen Mathea Larsen. In 1919 he married Nina Wiese.

== Career ==
Erichsen graduated as officer from the Norwegian Military Academy in 1901, and from the Norwegian Military College in 1905. He was promoted major in 1925, lieutenant colonel in 1929, and colonel and head of the 8th Infantry Regiment in Stavanger in 1930. From 1934 he was head of 6th Division in Harstad, with the rank of major general, and from 1939 he was head of 1st Division in Halden and commander at Fredriksten.

He died on 10 November 1949.
