= Wilhelm von Tangen Hansteen =

Norwegian Army officer (1896–1980)

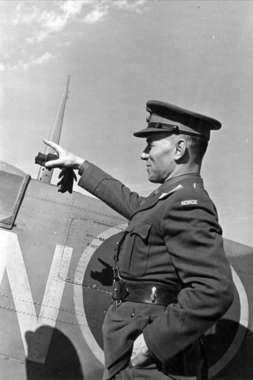
General Hansteen during the Second World War

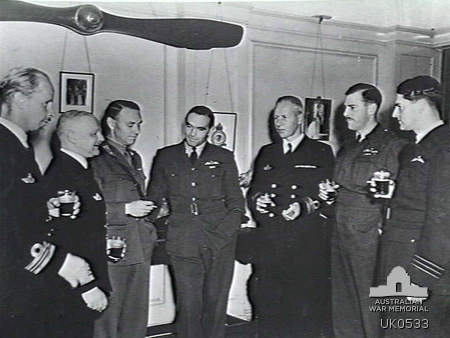
Hansteen (no. 3 from the left) in Scotland in 1943.

Wilhelm von Tangen Hansteen (11 May 1896 – 6 September 1980) was a Norwegian Army officer.

== Biography ==
Hansteen was born in Kristiania (now Oslo), Norway. He was the son of Axel August Hansteen (1863–1937) and Lina von Tangen (1870–1954). He was educated at the War College (1917) and the Norwegian Military Academy (1919). From 1937 to 1941, Hansteen served as the Norwegian military attaché to Helsinki. In this position he worked for stronger Norwegian support for Finland during the Winter War.

After a short period in Stockholm, he was in 1942 promoted directly from Major to Major General and appointed Commander in Chief of the Norwegian Armed Forces. He held this position until 1944 when then-Crown Prince Olav was made Commander in Chief. Hansteen served as Deputy Commander for the rest of World War II.

Hansteen continued his distinguished military career after the war, serving as commander of the Norwegian forces in Germany from 1946, as commander of the Norwegian Army from 1948, and as commander of NATO forces in Norway from 1951. He retired from the army in 1966 and died during 1980 in Oslo. Hansteen was the commander of the Order of St. Olav and Knight Commander of the British Order of the Bath, Commander of the French Legion of Honour.

== Other sources ==
- Charles D. Pettibone (2014) The Organization and Order of Battle of Militaries In World War II (Trafford Publishing) ISBN 9781490733869

Military offices
Preceded by Post vacant	Chief of Defence of Norway; 1942–1944	Succeeded by Crown Prince Olav
