= Norwegian campaign order of battle =

1940 order of battle during WWII

The German operation for the invasion of Denmark and Norway in April 1940 was code-named Weserübung, or "Weser Exercise." Opposing the invasion were the partially mobilized Norwegian military, and an allied expeditionary force composed of British, French, and Free Polish formations. The following list formed the order of battle for this campaign.

== Germany ==
=== Gruppe XXI ===
On 1 March 1940, the German 21st Army Corps was renamed Group XXI and placed in charge of the invasion of Norway. The group was allotted two Mountain and five Infantry divisions for this task. It was led by the commanding officer of the XXI Korps, General der Infanterie Nikolaus von Falkenhorst. His chief of staff was Oberst Erich Buschenhagen.

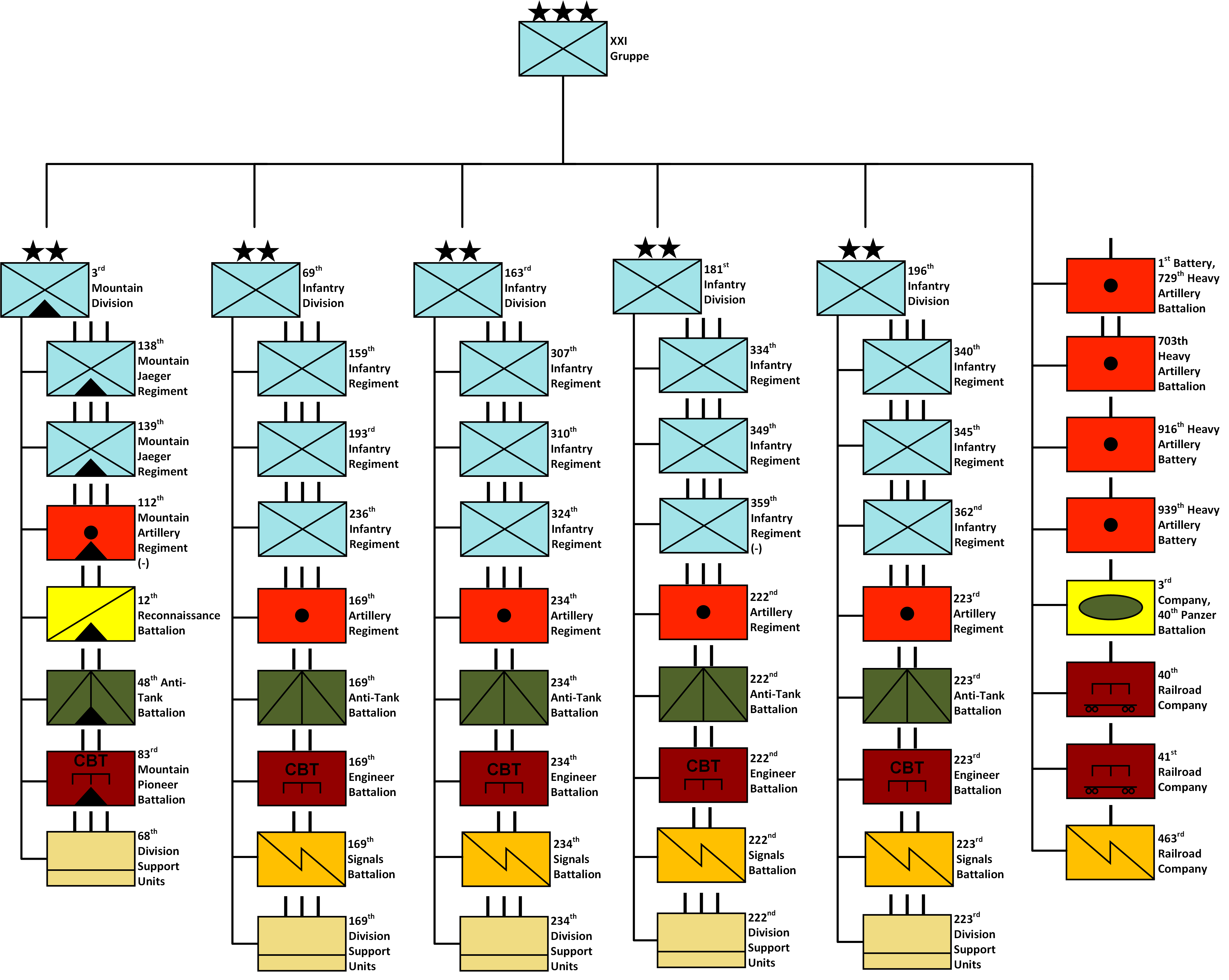
Organization of Wehrmacht Heer Gruppe XXI during the invasion of Norway and Denmark April 1940

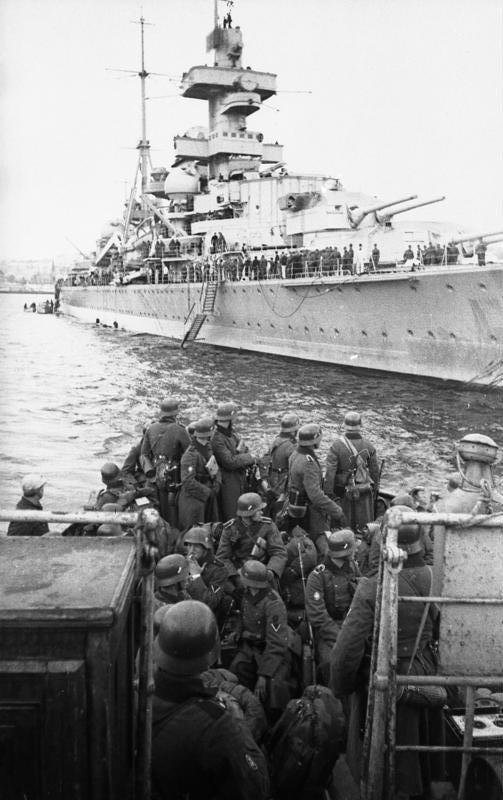
German Troops on landing craft

- 2nd Mountain Division
  - Commanded by Generalleutnant Valentin Feurstein
  - The division fought in the northern part of Norway, the 137th Regiment dropped by parachute at Narvik on 15 May.
  - Regiments: 136th & 137th mountain light infantry; 111th mountain artillery
- 3rd Mountain Division
  - Commanded by Generalleutnant Eduard Dietl
  - Most of this division was landed at Trondheim and Narvik on 9 April.
  - Regiments: 138th & 139th mountain light infantry; 112th mountain artillery
- 69th Infantry Division
  - Commanded by Generalmajor Hermann Tittel
  - From 9 April through 15 April, divisional elements were transported to Bergen, Stavanger, and Oslo.
  - Regiments: 159th, 193rd, and 236th infantry; 169th artillery
- 163rd Infantry Division
  - Commanded by Generalmajor Erwin Engelbrecht
  - Elements were landed at Oslo, Kristiansand, Arendal, and Stavanger, beginning on 9 April.
  - Regiments: 307th, 310th, and 324th infantry; 234th artillery
- 181st Infantry Division
  - Commanded by Generalmajor Kurt Woytasch
  - By 15 April, this division had arrived at Trondheim, being primarily transported by aircraft.
  - Regiments: 334th, 349th, and 359th infantry; 222nd artillery
- 196th Infantry Division
  - Commanded by Generalmajor Richard Pellengahr
  - By 15 April, most of this division had landed at Oslo.
  - Regiments: 340th, 345th, and 362nd infantry; 233rd artillery
- 214th Infantry Division
  - Commanded by Generalmajor Max Horn. It landed at Kristiansand and Arendal on 17 and 18 April.
  - Regiments: 355th, 367th, and 388th infantry; 214th artillery
- 170th Infantry Division
  - Commanded by Generalmajor Walter Wittke
  - Entered Denmark through the southern end of Jutland peninsula on 9 April.
  - Regiments: 391st, 399th, and 401st infantry; 240th artillery
- 198th Infantry Division
  - Commanded by Generalmajor Otto Röttig
  - Occupied Copenhagen, Zealand, and the southern Danish islands on 9 April.
  - Regiments: 305th, 308th, and 326th infantry; 235th artillery
- German 11th Motorized Rifle Brigade
  - Commanded by Oberst Günther Angern
  - Part of the Denmark invasion force. It was replaced by garrison troops from the 160th Security Division on 13 May, when the brigade was withdrawn for use in the invasion of France.
  - Regiments: 110th and 111th motorized infantry
  - Panzer Abteilung z.b.V 40

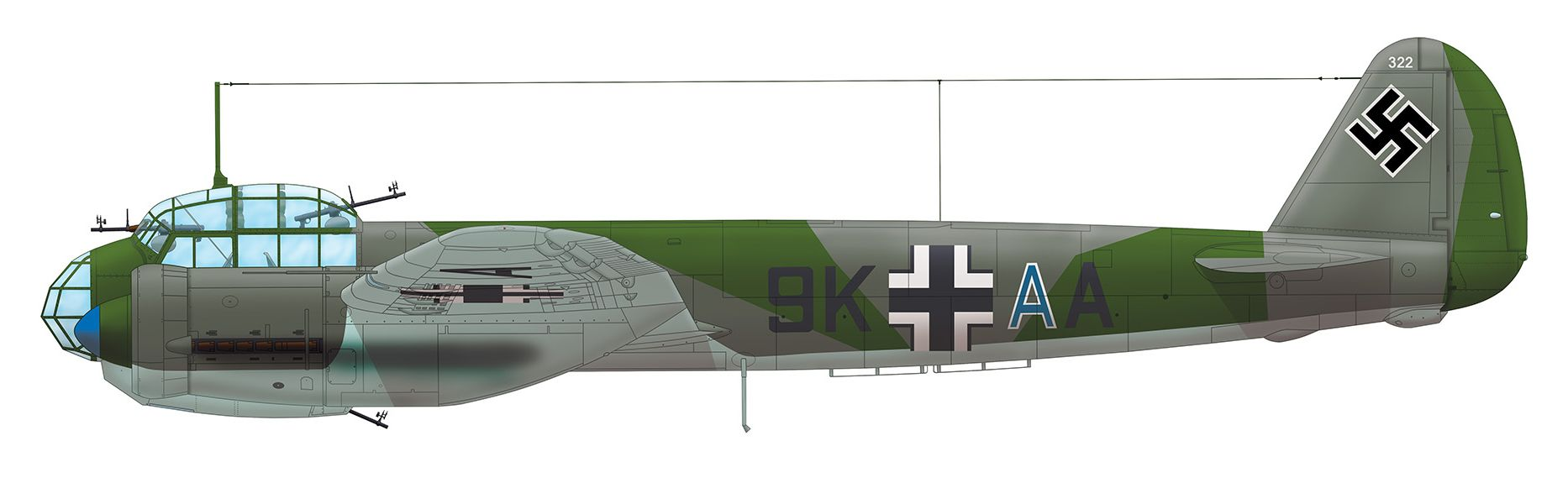
German Junkers Ju 88 bomber

=== Luftwaffe ===
The Luftwaffe's X Fliegerkorps was commanded by Generalleutnant Hans Ferdinand Geisler; it had operational command of all Luftwaffe units participating in Operation Weserübung.

- Parachute troops
  - I/German 1st Parachute Regiment
  - Commanded by Major Erich Walther
  - Individual companies were used to occupy key airfields in northern Denmark (Aalborg Airport), near Stavanger (Sola Airport), and Oslo (Fornebu Airport).
- Aircraft available
  - 102 fighters.
  - 233 bombers.
  - 39 dive bombers.
  - 165 reconnaissance aircraft (including float planes).
  - 582 transport aircraft.

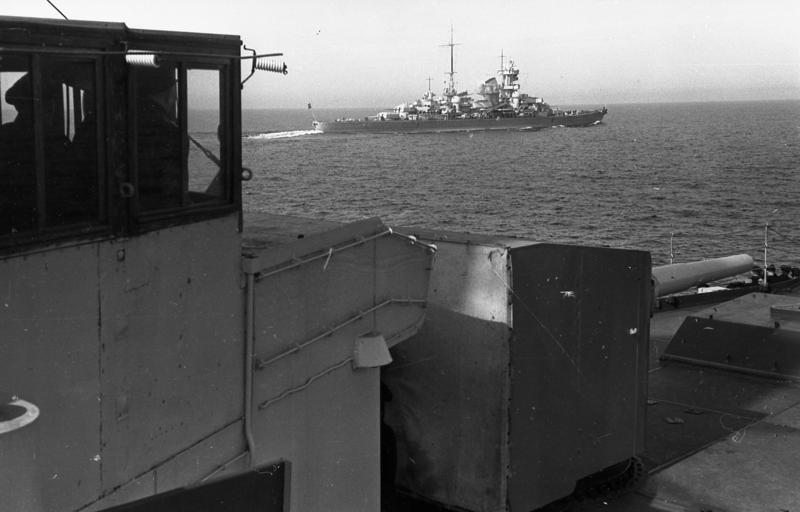
An Admiral Hipper class heavy cruiser, either Admiral Hipper or Blücher, en route to Norway.

=== Kriegsmarine ===
Baltic Sea and Norwegian Waters Naval Group Command West – Generaladmiral Alfred Saalwächter

Battleship Force – Vizeadmiral Günther Lütjens

- Gneisenau, Kapitän zur See Harald Netzbandt (damaged 20 June)
- Scharnhorst, Kapitän zur See Kurt-Caesar Hoffmann (damaged 8 June)

Objective: Narvik

Warship Group One – Kapitän zur See and Kommodore Friedrich Bonte ( † 10 April)

- First Flotilla (detachment) – Fregattenkapitän Fritz Berger
  - Z2 Georg Thiele (Type 1934) – Korvettenkapitän Max-Eckart Wolff (Flotilla Flagship) (beached 13 April)
- Second Flotilla – Fregattenkapitän Erich Bey
  - Z9 Wolfgang Zenker (Type 1934A) – Fregattenkapitän Gottfried Pönitz (Flotilla Flagship) (beached and scuttled 13 April)
  - Z11 Bernd von Arnim (Type 1934A) – Korvettenkapitän Curt Rechel (beached and scuttled 13 April)
  - Z12 Erich Geise (Type 1934A) – Korvettenkapitän Karl Smidt (sunk 13 April)
  - Z13 Erich Koellner (Type 1934A) – Fregattenkapitän Alfred Schulze-Hinrichs (scuttled 13 April, Schulze-Hinrichs (POW))
- Third Flotilla – Fregattenkapitän H.-J. Gadow
  - Z17 Diether von Roeder (Type 1936) – Korvettenkapitän Erich Holthof (scuttled 13 April)
  - Z18 Hans Lüdemann (Type 1936) – Korvettenkapitän Herbert Friedrichs (Flotilla Flagship) (beached 13 April)
  - Z19 Hermann Künne (Type 1936) – Korvettenkapitän Friedrich Kothe (scuttled 13 April)
  - Z21 Wilhelm Heidkamp (Type 1936) – Korvettenkapitän Hans Erdmenger, (Group One Flagship) (sunk 10 April)
  - Z22 Anton Schmitt (Type 1936) – Korvettenkapitän Friedrich Böhme (sunk in First Battle of Narvik 10 April)

Transporting:

- Advanced HQ/3rd Mountain Division – Generalleutnant Eduard Dietl, 139th Mountain Regiment/3rd Mountain Division – Oberst Windisch, coastal artillery battery (crew only), Naval signals section, Army signals platoon, I Bn/32nd LW Flak Regiment (personnel only)

Landing Group (planned to be at or entering Narvik when Warship Group One was scheduled to arrive.)

- Bärenfels (cargo ship) (army equipment, guns, and ammunition) – diverted to Bergen and sunk by Fleet Air Arm air attack on 14 April
- Rauenfels (cargo ship) (army equipment, guns, and ammunition) – sunk by British destroyers Havock and Hostile while entering the Ofotfjord on 10 April.
- Alster (cargo ship) (motor transport and military stores) – captured by the British destroyer Icarus near Bodø on 10 April

Tanker Group

- Jan Wellem (tanker) – arrived at Narvik, sunk 13 April
- Kattegat (tanker) – scuttled by crew after being intercepted by Norwegian patrol boat Nordkapp on 9 April

Objective Trondheim

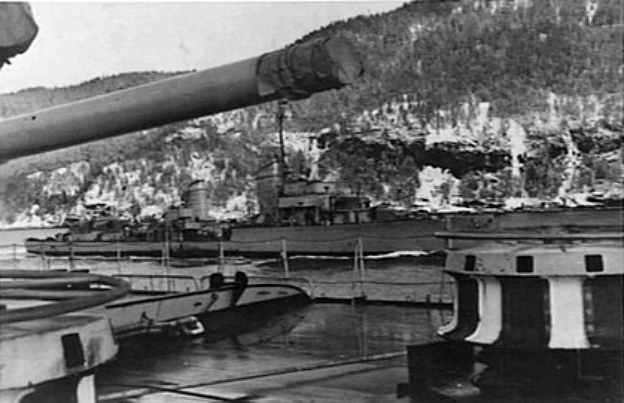
Admiral Hipper and a destroyer approaching Trondheim.

Warship Group Two – Kapitän zur See Hellmuth Heye,

- Admiral Hipper, Kapitän zur See Hellmuth Heye (damaged 8 April)
- 2. Destroyer Flotilla – Fregattenkapitän Rudolf von Pufendorf
  - Z5 Paul Jakobi (Type 1934A) – Korvettenkapitän Hans-Georg Zimmer, Flagship of 2. Destroyer Flotilla
  - Z6 Theodor Riedel (Type 1934A) – Korvettenkapitän Gerhardt Böhmig
  - Z8 Bruno Heinemann (Type 1934A) – Korvettenkapitän Hermann Alberts
  - Z16 Friedrich Eckoldt (Type 1934A) – Korvettenkapitän Alfred Schemmel
- Naval Special Operations Group – Korvettenkapitän Wilhelm Hornack

Transporting:

- 138th Mountain Regiment/3rd Mountain Division – Oberst Weiss, minus one company on the Lutzow, diverted to Oslo, 1./112th Mountain Artillery Regiment, 1./38th Engineer Battalion, naval signals detachment, army signals platoon, Two Coast Artillery Batteries (crews only), I Bn/611th LW Flak Regiment – personnel only, airbase personnel

Landing Group (Planned to be at or entering Trondheim when Warship Group Two was scheduled to arrive.)

- Sao Paulo (supply ship) (mined off Bergen on 9 April, mine laid by Norwegian minelayer Tyr),
- Levante (cargo ship)
- Main (supply ship) (captured and sunk on 9 April by Norwegian destroyer Draug)

Tanker Group

- Skagerrak (tanker) (scuttled on 14 April when intercepted by the Royal Navy cruiser Suffolk)
- Moonsund (tanker) (sunk on 12 April by the British submarine Snapper)

Objective Bergen

Warship Group Three – Rear Admiral Hubert Schmundt

- Köln – Kapitän zur See Ernst Kratzenberg (Flag)
- Königsberg – Kapitän zur See Heinrich Ruhfus (damaged by Norwegian coastal artillery on 9 April, then sunk by Fleet Air Arm aircraft on 10 April)
- Bremse Fregattenkapitän Jakob Förschner (damaged by Norwegian coastal artillery on 9 April)
- Torpedo boat Leopard Kapitänleutnant Hans Trummer (sunk in collision 30 April)
- Torpedo boat Wolf, Oberleutnant Broder Peters, Flag of 6. Torpedo Boat Flotilla Korvettenkapitän Hans Marks,

1. S-Boatflotilla – Kapitänleutnant Heinz Birnbacher

- S-Boat-Tender Carl Peters, Kapitänleutnant Otto Hinzke (damaged by Norwegian coastal artillery on 9 April)
- S19, S21, S22, S23, S24, Schiff 9 (mined off Bergen on 10 April, mine laid by Norwegian minelayer Tyr), Schiff 18 (damaged and beached 25 April)

Transporting:

- HQ/69th Infantry Division, 1./169th Engineer Bn, 2./169th Engineer Bn, HQ/159th Infantry Regiment, I./159th infantry Regiment, II./159th infantry Regiment (-5. Company), 159th Band, naval signals section, army signals platoon, two coastal artillery batteries (crews only), I Bn/33rd LW Flak Regiment – personnel only, airbase personnel

Landing Group

- Rio de Janeiro (troop ship) (torpedoed and sunk off Lillesand by the Polish submarine Orzeł)

Landing Group Stavanger

- Roda (cargo ship) (captured and sunk on 9 April by Norwegian destroyer Æger)

Objectives Kristiansand and Arendal

Warship Group Four – Kapitän zur See Friedrich Rieve

- Karlsruhe – Kapitän zur See Friedrich Rieve (torpedoed and sunk on 9 April by the British submarine Truant on return voyage to Germany)
- Torpedo boat Luchs – Kapitänleutnant Karl Kassbaum, flagship of Kapitän zur See Hans Bütow (F.d.T. = Leader of T-Boats),
- Torpedo boat Greif – Kapitänleutnant Wilhelm-Nikolaus Freiherr von Lyncker, flagship Korvettenkapitän Wolf Henne, leader of 5. Torpedo Boat Flotilla),
- Torpedo boat Seeadler – Kapitänleutnant Franz Kohlauf,

2. S-Boat-Flotilla – Korvettenkapitän Rudolf Petersen

- S-Boat-Tender Tsingtau – Kapitän zur See Carl Klingner
- S7, S8, S17, S30, S31, S32, S33

Transporting

- HQ/310th Infantry Regiment, I/310th Infantry Regiment, 9 Co./310th Infantry Regiment, 234th Bicycle Infantry Co., naval signals platoon, two coastal artillery batteries (crews only)

Objectives Oslo and Oslofjord

Warship Group Five – Rear Admiral Oskar Kummetz Objective Oslo

- Blücher – Kapitän zur See Heinrich Woldag, flagship (sunk 9 April by the Norwegian coastal fortress Oscarsborg in the Oslofjord)
- Lützow – Kapitän zur See August Thiele (damaged by Oscarsborg 9 April, then torpedoed and further damaged by Spearfish on 11 April, during the return voyage to Germany)
- Emden – Kapitän zur See Werner Lange
- R18
- R19
- Rau 8

Objectives Son and Moss

- Torpedo boat Möwe – Kapitänleutnant Helmut Neuss

Objective Horten

- Torpedo boat Albatros – Kapitänleutnant Siegfried Strelow (grounded and wrecked 10 April while under fire from Norwegian coastal artillery)
- Torpedo boat Kondor – Kapitänleutnant Hans Wilcke
- R17 (sunk 9 April by Norwegian warships Olav Tryggvason and Rauma)
- R22 (damaged by Olav Tryggvason and Rauma)
- Rau 7

Objective Rauøy Island

- R20
- R24

Objective Bolærne Island

- R22
- R23

Objective Egersund Cable Station

Warship Group Six – Korvettenkapitän Kurt Thoma, 2 Minehunting Flotilla

- M-1, M-2, M-9, M-13

Objectives Korsör and Nyborg

Warship Group Seven – Kapitän zur See Gustav Kleikamp

- Schleswig-Holstein – Kapitän zur See Gustav Kleikamp
- Claus von Bevern (mine warfare trial ship, ex minesweeper/large torpedo boat)
- Pelikan (mine warfare trial ship, ex minesweeper)
- Nautilus (mine warfare trial ship, ex minesweeper)
- Campinas (cargo ship)
- Cordoba (cargo ship)
- MRS 12 (minesweeper)

School Flotilla of Commander in Chief Baltic Approaches

- Six armed fishing trawlers – Fregattenkapitän Dr. Oskar Dannenberg

Objectives Copenhagen

Warship Group Eight – Korvettenkapitän Wilhelm Schroeder

- Hansestadt Danzig (minelayer) – Korvettenkapitän Wilhelms Schroeder
- Stettin (icebreaker)

Warship Group Eight supported in the waters of the Belt by 13. Patron-Flotilla – Kapitänleutnant Dr. Walther Fischer

Objectives Middelfart and Belt Bridge

Warship Group Nine – Kapitän zur See Helmut Leissner, F.d.V.O

- Rugard (cargo ship), flagship of F.d.V.O,
- Arkona (M115), Otto Braun (M129), Cressida, Silvia, R6, R7 (minesweepers)
- UJ 107 (ASW patrol craft)
- Passat, Monsun (Tugs)

Objectives Esbjerg and Nordby

Warship Group Ten – Kapitän zur See and Kommodore Friedrich Ruge F.d.M. West

- Königin Luise (F6) (patrol craft)

12. Minehunter Flotilla – Korvettenkapitän Karl Marguth

- KFK M1201, KFK M1202, KFK M1203, KFK M1204, KFK M1205, KFK M1206, KFK M1207, KFK M1208, M4, M20, M84, M102 (minesweepers)

2. Minesweeper Flotilla – Korvettenkapitän Gert von Kamptz

- R25, R26, R27, R28, R29, R30, R31, R32 (R boat minesweepers)

Objective Thyborön

'Warship Group Eleven – Korvettenkapitän Walter Berger 4. Minehunter Flotilla – Korvettenkapitän Walter Berger

- M-61, M-89, M-110, M-111, M-134, M-136 (minesweepers)

3. Minesweeper Flotilla – Kapitänleutnant Hagen Küster

- R 33, R 34, R 35, R 36, R 37, R 38, R 39, R 40 (minesweepers)
- Von Der Groeben – Oberleutnant zur See Gustav Czycholl (R boat tender)

Mine Sweeper Covering Group Laying minefields to the Skagerrak to protect the German resupply route to southern Norway.

- Schlesien (pre-dreadnought battleship)

Minelaying Group – Kapitän zur See Kurt Böhmer:

- Roland – Korvettenkapitän Karl von Kutzleben (minelayer)
- Cobra – Kapitänleutnant Dr. Ing. Karl-Friedrich Brill (minelayer)
- Preussen – Korvettenkapitän Karl Freiherr von der Recke (minelayer)
- Königin Luise – Kapitänleutnant Kurt Foerster
- M6, M10, M11, M12 (minesweepers fitted to lay mines)

U-Boat Force Force – Rear Admiral Karl Dönitz

U-Boat Group One Patrol area: Narvik, Harstad, Vestfjord, Vågsfjord

- U-25, U-46, U-51, U-64 (sunk 13 April), U-65

U-Boat Group Two Patrol area: Trondheim, Namsos, Romsdalsfjord

- U-30, U-34

U-Boat Group Three Patrol area: Bergen, Ålesund, Shetland Islands

- U-9, U-14, U-56, U-60, U-62

U-Boat Group Four Patrol area: Stavanger

- U-1 (sunk c. 6 April), U-4

U-Boat Group Five Patrol area: East of the Shetland Islands, Vågsfjord, Trondheim

- U-37, U-38, U-47, U-48, U-49 (sunk 15 April), U-50 (sunk 6 April)

U-Boat Group Six Patrol area: Pentland, Orkney Islands, Shetland Islands

- U-13 (sunk 31 May), U-57, U-58, U-59

U-Boat Group Seven Never assembled

U-Boat Group Eight Patrol area: Lindesnes, Egersund

- U-2, U-3, U-5, U-6

U-Boat Group Nine Patrol area: Bergen, Shetland Islands

- U-7, U-10, U-19

Unassigned to a group Operating in the area of the Orkney Islands, Shetland Islands, and Bergen

- U-17, U-23, U-24, U-61

== Norway ==
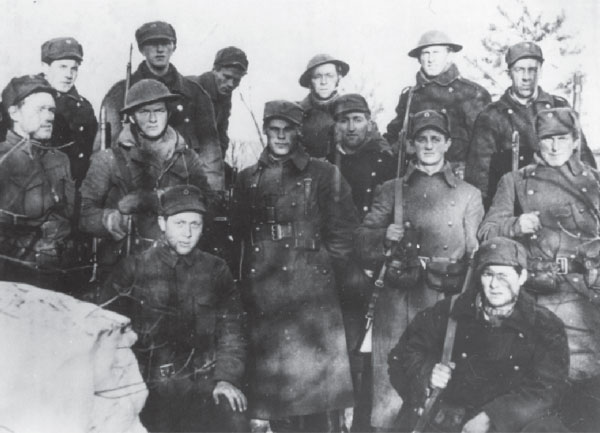
Norwegian Soldiers at Hegra Fortress

Owing to the speed and surprise achieved by the German forces, the Norwegian army was only able to partially mobilize. Unit strengths were only a fraction of their paper establishments.

Unlike the armies of most other nations, the Norwegian "division" was more of an administrative and mobilization unit, rather than a fighting formation. The most important tactical unit of the Norwegian army was the regiment. When mobilized, each regiment was supposed to muster two battalions of infantry of the line, and one battalion of landvern. Some of the Norwegian forces were ad hoc battalions.

The commander of the Norwegian Army at the time of the invasion was General Kristian Laake. He was replaced by Colonel Otto Ruge on 11 April.

Each Regiment had 3,750 soldiers, with 60,000 being the total number of soldiers by 1940. Every battalion had around 1,250 soldiers. However, only 55,000 soldiers were well prepared.

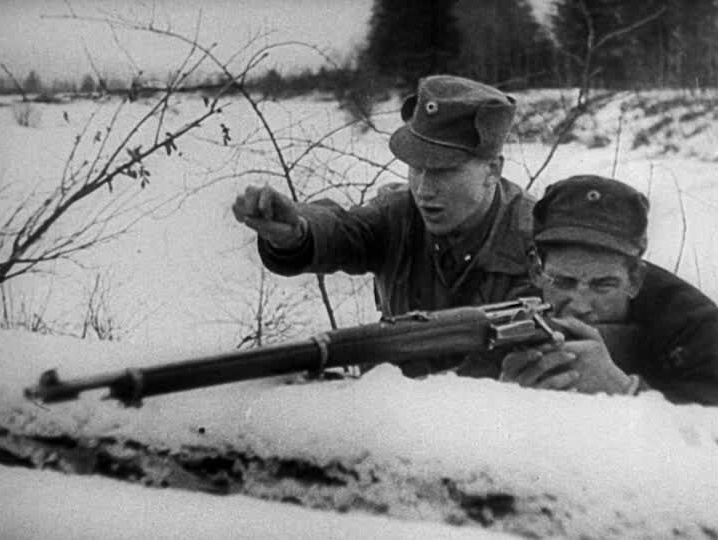
Norwegian Rifleman 1940

=== Norwegian Army ===
- The Royal Guards battalion – based in Oslo and Elverum, the only unit in Southern Norway that received proper training during the inter-war years.
- 1st Division – This division had its headquarters in Halden, and was commanded by Major-General Carl Johan Erichsen.
  - 1st Infantry Regiment (based in Fredrikstad)
  - 2nd Infantry Regiment (based in Oslo)
  - 3rd Infantry Regiment (based in Kongsberg)
- 2nd Division – This division had its headquarters in Oslo, and was commanded by Major-General Jacob Hvinden Haug.
  - 4th Infantry Regiment (based in Trandum)
  - 5th Infantry Regiment (based in Elverum)
  - 6th Infantry Regiment (based in Hønefoss)
- 3rd Division – This division had its headquarters in Kristiansand, and was commanded by Major-General Einar Liljedahl.
  - 7th Infantry Regiment (based in Kristiansand)
  - 8th Infantry Regiment (based in Stavanger)
- 4th Division – This division had its headquarters in Bergen, and was commanded by Major-General William Steffens.
  - 9th Infantry Regiment (based in Bergen)
  - 10th Infantry Regiment (based in Voss)
- 5th Division – This division had its headquarters in Trondheim, and was commanded by Major-General Jacob Ager Laurantzon.
  - 11th Infantry Regiment (based in Åndalsnes)
  - 12th Infantry Regiment (based in Trondheim)
  - 13th Infantry Regiment (based in Steinkjer)
- 6th Division – This division had its headquarters in Harstad, and was commanded by Major-General Carl Gustav Fleischer. The division was better prepared for war than any other unit of the Norwegian Army as it had been mobilised and kept on duty during the Finnish Winter War.
  - 14th Infantry Regiment (based in Mosjøen)
  - 15th Infantry Regiment (based at Elvegårdsmoen)
  - 16th Infantry Regiment (based in Tromsø and Bardufoss)

During the campaign, the 6th Division formed two light infantry brigades. The 6th Brigade was initially commanded by Colonel Kristian Løken, and from 9 May by Lieutenant Colonel Ole Berg, and the 7th Brigade, commanded by Colonel Wilhelm Faye.

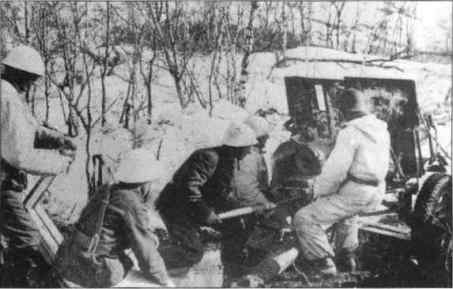
Norwegian Army 7.5 cm field gun

- Additional units – These were additional units not organised into divisions.
  - 1st Dragoon Regiment (based at Gardermoen, including Norway's only tank)
  - 2nd Dragoon Regiment (based in Hamar)
  - 3rd Dragoon Regiment (based in Rindleiret, Verdal)
  - 1st Artillery Regiment (based in Ski)
  - 2nd Artillery Regiment (based at Gardermoen)
  - 3rd Artillery Regiment (based in Trondheim/Stjørdal)
  - 1st Mountain Artillery Battalion (based in Evje)
  - 2nd Mountain Artillery Battalion (based in Voss)
  - 3rd Mountain Artillery Battalion (based in Bardufoss)
  - Alta Battalion (based at Altagård in Alta)
  - Varanger Battalion (based in Kirkenes, with training grounds at Nyborgmoen near Varangerbotn)

At the time of the German invasion, the Norwegian Army was only partially mobilized, and thus only the following land units were immediately available to the Norwegians;

- The Oslo battalion of the Royal Guards
- 4 regiments of the 1st and 2nd Divisions
- 3 battalions of the 3rd Division
- 5 battalion for the 4th Division
- Only about 2 battalions and a company of 5th Division
- The 6th Division
- Three landvern companies at Horten, Haugesund and on various fortresses in the Oslofjord.
- One artillery battalion at Fredrikstad, and another one in the extreme north.
- One artillery battery at Gardermoen, and two more in the extreme north.
- One mountain artillery battery at Evjemoen
- One engineer company near Madla
- Partially mobilised elements of the 3rd Dragoon Regiment at the outskirts of Trondheim
- A company of volunteers at Hegra Fortress
- The Alta and Varanger Battalions

==== Norwegian Army Air Service ====
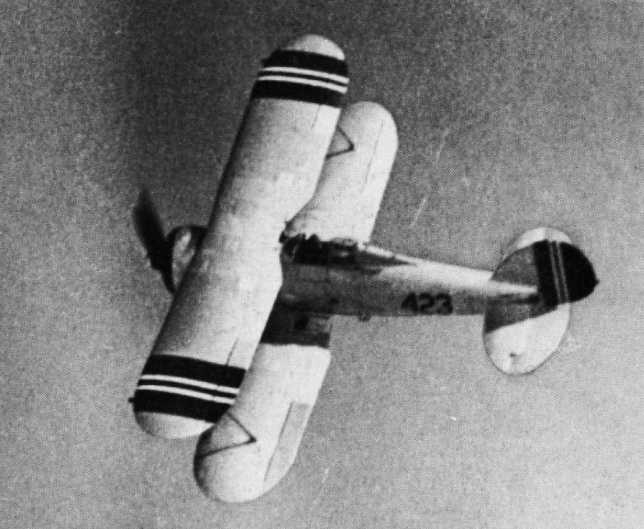
Norwegian Army Air Service Gloster Gladiator 423

At the outbreak of the German invasion, the Norwegian Army Air Service consisted of:

- 11 Gloster Gladiator biplane fighters (7 operational)
- 3 Armstrong Whitworth Scimitar biplane fighters (none operational, undergoing maintenance)
- 4 Caproni Ca.310 monoplane reconnaissance/bombers (3 operational)
- 25 Fokker C.V-D reconnaissance/bomber biplanes (24 operational)
- 16 Fokker C.V-E reconnaissance/bomber biplanes (16 operational)
- 29 de Havilland Tiger Moth biplane trainers (26 operational)
- 3 de Havilland DH.60 Moth biplane trainers (none operational, undergoing maintenance)
- 6 Curtiss P-36 Hawk monoplane fighters (none operational, still under final assembly)

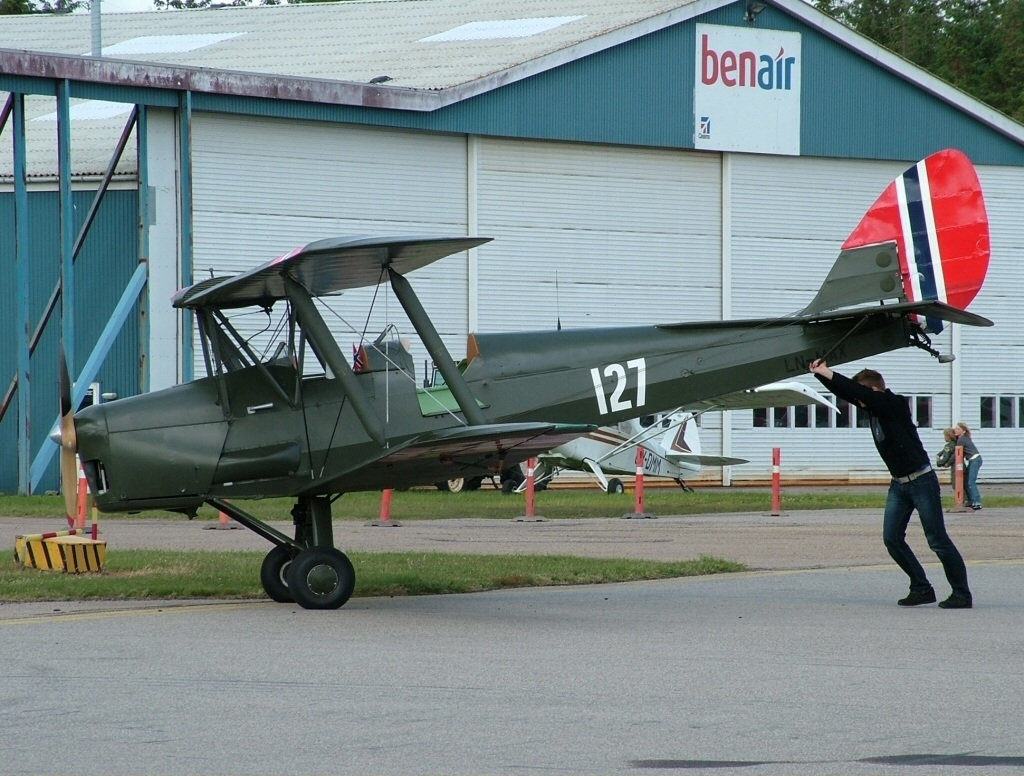
Norwegian dh.82 fighter biplane

Of the Norwegian Army Air Service's aircraft, all were shot down, destroyed or captured by the Germans during the campaign, except two Fokker C.Vs and one Tiger Moth that were flown to Finland on 8 June 1940. The three biplanes were intended to form a Norwegian Army Air Service training unit in Finland under the command of Captain Ole Reistad, but were eventually taken over by the Finnish Air Force.

=== Royal Norwegian Navy ===
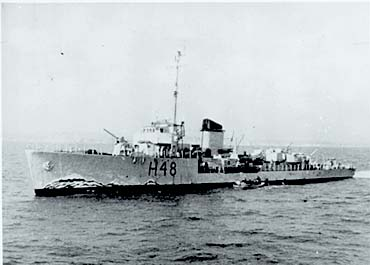
HNoMS Sleipner (H48)

The Royal Norwegian Navy during the campaign consisted of:

- 2 Eidsvold-class coastal defence ships:
  - Eidsvold (sunk 9 April), Norge (sunk 9 April)
- 7 destroyers:
  - Three Draug-class: Troll (captured 18 May), Garm (sunk 26 April) and Draug (evacuated to the United Kingdom 9 April).
  - Four Sleipner-class: Æger (sunk 9 April), Sleipner (evacuated to the United Kingdom 25 April), Gyller and Odin (both captured 9 April)
  - Two incomplete Sleipner-class destroyers: Tor (scuttled 9 April) and Balder (captured 9 April)
- 11 minelayers:
  - Five Vale-class: Vale (captured 13 May), Uller (captured 9 April, sunk by Norwegian forces 1 May), Brage (captured 9 April), Nor (captured 14 April), Vidar (captured 14 April)
  - Two Gor-class: Gor (captured 13 May), Tyr (captured 20 April),
  - Two Glommen-class: Glommen (captured 14 April), Laugen (captured 14 April),
  - Two unique vessels: Frøya (scuttled 13 April), Olav Tryggvason (captured 9 April)
- 8 minesweepers:
  - Two Otra-class: Otra (captured 10 April) and Rauma (captured 9 April)
  - Six rebuilt 2. class torpedo boats: Djerv (scuttled 2 May), Dristig (scuttled 2 May), Hvas (captured 11 April), Kjæk (captured 12 April), Falk (captured 12 April), Hauk (captured 9 April)
- 9 submarines:
  - Three A class: A-2 (damaged and run aground 9 April), A-3 (scuttled 16 April), A-4 (scuttled 16 April)
  - Six B class: B-1 (evacuated to the United Kingdom 8 June), B-2 (captured 11 April), B-3 (scuttled 10 June), B-4 (captured 10 April), B-5 (captured 9 April), B-6 (captured 18 May)
- 17 torpedo boats:
  - Three Trygg-class: Trygg (sunk 25 April), Snøgg (captured 5 May), Stegg (sunk 20 April)
  - Six 1. class: Brand (captured 9 April), Laks (captured 13 April), Sæl (sunk 18 April), Storm (wrecked 12/13 April), Sild (scuttled 5 May), Skrei (scuttled 8 May)
  - Eight 2. class: Grib (scuttled 17 April), Jo (scuttled 17 April), Kjell (captured 11 April), Lom (captured 9 April), Ravn (scuttled 17 April), Skarv (captured 9 April), Teist (scuttled 14 April), Ravn (captured 9 April)
- 58 patrol boats, including:
  - Fridtjof Nansen (evacuated to the United Kingdom 8 June), Heimdal (evacuated to the United Kingdom 8 June), Honningsvåg (captured from the Germans 13 April, evacuated to the United Kingdom 7 June), Nordkapp (evacuated to the United Kingdom 8 June), SS Oster (2) (captured 22 May), Pol III (captured 14 April), Thorodd (evacuated to the United Kingdom 8 June)

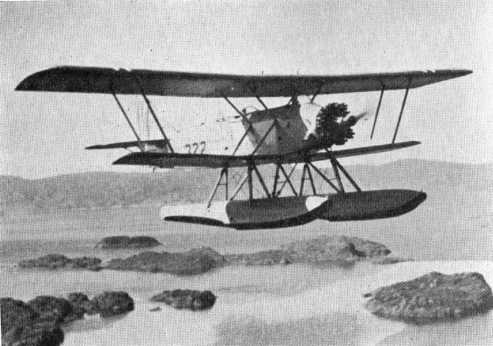
Norwegian mf.11 naval bomber

==== Royal Norwegian Navy Air Service ====
The Royal Norwegian Navy Air Service consisted of:

- 6 Heinkel He 115 seaplane reconnaissance torpedo bombers (all operational)
- 1 Marinens Flyvebaatfabrikk M.F.12 biplane trainer aircraft (not operational, undergoing repairs)
- 1 Junkers Ju 52 seaplane bomber (not operational, undergoing maintenance)
- 20 Marinens Flyvebaatfabrikk M.F.11 biplane reconnaissance seaplane (17 operational, 3 undergoing maintenance)
- 3 Marinens Flyvebaatfabrikk M.F.10 biplane trainer seaplane (two operational, one undergoing maintenance)
- 5 Marinens Flyvebaatfabrikk M.F.8 biplane trainer seaplane (two operational, three undergoing maintenance)
- 6 Douglas DT2B/C torpedo bomber biplanes (two operational, one undergoing maintenance and three not mobilized)
- 4 Breda Ba.25 biplane trainer aircraft (none operational, all undergoing maintenance)

Of the Royal Norwegian Navy Air Service's fleet of aircraft, four Heinkel He 115s were evacuated to the United Kingdom at the end of the campaign, while one He 115 and three Marinens Flyvebaatfabrikk M.F.11s were flown to Finland and taken over by the Finnish Air Force.

== Allied ==
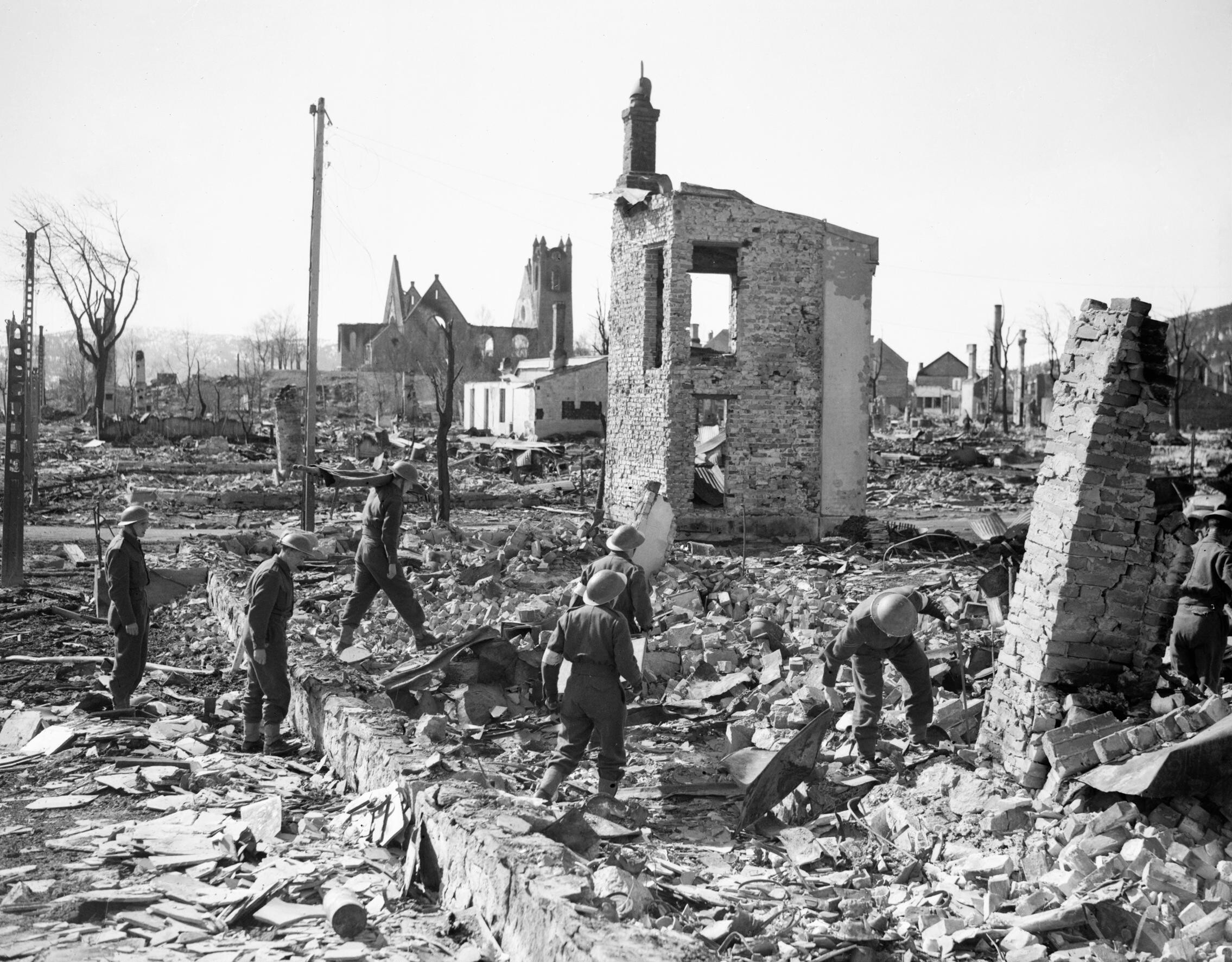
British Mauriceforce troops at Nasmos

=== Mauriceforce ===
Commanded by Major-General Carton de Wiart V.C., this group began landing at Namsos on 14 April.

- British 146th Infantry Brigade – Commanded by Brigadier Charles G. Phillips
  - 1/4th Battalion, Royal Lincolnshire Regiment
  - 1/4th Battalion, King's Own Yorkshire Light Infantry
  - Hallamshire Battalion, York and Lancaster Regiment
- French 5e Demi-Brigade Chasseurs Alpins – Commanded by Général de Brigade Antoine Béthouart
  - 13ème Bataillon Chasseurs Alpins
  - 53ème Bataillon Chasseurs Alpins
  - 67ème Bataillon Chasseurs Alpins

=== Sickleforce ===
Commanded by Major-General Bernard Charles Tolver Paget, this force landed at Åndalsnes starting 18 April.

- 15th Infantry Brigade – Commanded by Brigadier Herbert Edward Fitzroy Smyth
  - 1st Battalion, Green Howards
  - 1st Battalion, King's Own Yorkshire Light Infantry
  - 1st Battalion, York and Lancaster Regiment
- 148th Infantry Brigade – Commanded by Brigadier Harold de Riemer Morgan
  - 1/5th Battalion, Leicestershire Regiment
  - 1/8th Battalion, Sherwood Foresters
- 168 Light Anti-Aircraft Battery, Royal Artillery from 56th (East Lancashire) Light Anti-Aircraft Regiment, Royal Artillery
- 260th Heavy Anti-Aircraft Battery, Royal Artillery
- 55th Field Company, Royal Engineers

=== Rupertforce ===
Commanded by Major-General Pierse Joseph Mackesy, this force landed at Harstad, north of Narvik, between 15 April and 5 May.

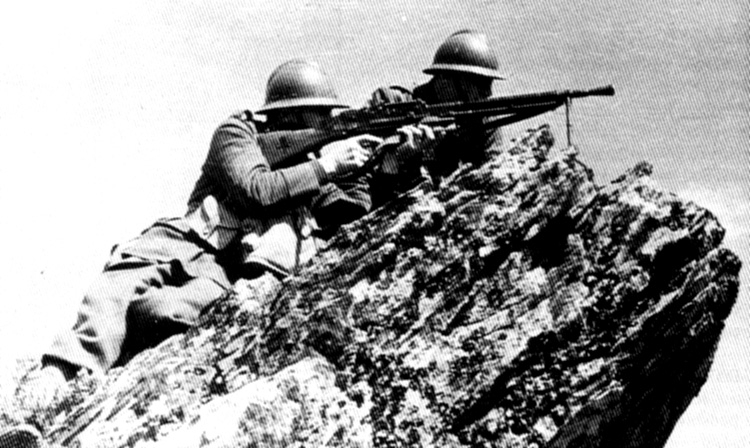
Polish Troops at Narvik

- 24th (Guards) Brigade – Commanded by Brigadier William Fraser
  - 1st Battalion, Scots Guards
  - 1st Battalion, Irish Guards
  - 2nd Battalion, South Wales Borderers
- French 27e Demi-Brigade de Chasseurs Alpins – Commanded by Lieutenant Colonel Sèrge Valentini
  - 6ème Bataillon Chasseurs Alpins
  - 12ème Bataillon Chasseurs Alpins
  - 14ème Bataillon Chasseurs Alpins
- French 13th Foreign Legion Demi-Brigade – Commanded by Lieutenant Colonel Raoul Magrin-Vernerey. Landed at Harstad on 5 May.
  - 1er Bataillon
  - 2ème Bataillon
- Polish Independent Highland Brigade – Commanded by General Zygmunt Bohusz-Szyszko
  - 1st Demi-Brigade
    - 1 Battalion
    - 2 Battalion
  - 2nd Demi-Brigade
    - 3 Battalion
    - 4 Battalion
- One troop, 3rd The King's Own Hussars (personnel only, no tanks) (Note: The 3rd The King's Own Hussars embarked three Light Tank Mk VIs, the only British tanks despatched to Norway, on the Polish troopship MS Chrobry; but, in while en route to Bodø in the early hours of 15 May 1940, she was attacked by German aircraft with the resulting loss of the ship and all of the equipment aboard it.)
  - 203 (Cumberland) Field Battery from 51st (Westmorland and Cumberland) Field Regiment, Royal Artillery
- French 342me Independent Tank Company
- French 2me Independent Colonial Artillery Group
- British Nos. 1, 3, 4 and 5 Independent Companies ("Scissorsforce") commanded by Lieutenant Colonel Colin Gubbins, landed Mosjøen, Mo i Rana and Bodø 8/9 May.
- British No. 2 Independent Company commanded by Major Hugh Stockwell, landed at Bodø 15 May.

=== North Western Expeditionary Force ===
Commanded by Lieutenant-General Claude Auchinleck, this force resulted from the reorganisation of British forces in the Narvik area on 13 May 1940.

- 24th (Guards) Brigade, acting commander, Brigadier Colin Gubbins; organisation as above. Brought back to Narvik from Bodø for evacuation on 29–31 May.
- Nos 2, 3 and 5 Independent Companies: brought back to Narvik from Bodø for evacuation on 29–31 May, Nos 1 and 4 Companies having been evacuated directly to home ports.
- One troop 3rd Kings Hussars without tanks
- 203 Battery, 51st Field Regiment, Royal Artillery
- 6th Anti-Aircraft Brigade commanded by Brigadier F.N.C. Rosseter
  - No 10 Army Observer Unit
  - 51st (London) Heavy Anti-Aircraft Regiment, Royal Artillery (23 x 3.7-inch mobile AA guns, based at Harstad, Skånland, and some attached to Bodø Force)
  - 82nd (Essex) Heavy Anti-Aircraft Regiment, Royal Artillery (24 x 3.7-inch mobile AA guns)
    - 156th (Essex) HAA Bty in Bardufoss
    - 193rd (Essex) HAA Bty in Tromsø and Sørreisa
  - 55th (Devon) Light Anti-Aircraft Regiment, Royal Artillery (36 x 40mm Bofors guns, detachments in Harstad, Skånland, Bardufoss, and Bodø force)
  - 167th Light Anti-Aircraft Bty from 56th (East Lancashire) Light Anti-Aircraft Regiment, Royal Artillery, (10 x 40mm Bofors guns in Tromsø and Sørreisa)
  - 3rd LAA Bty (10 x 40mm Bofors guns in Bardufoss and French force)
- 229 and 230 Field Companies, Royal Engineers
- Detachment 231 Field Park Company, Royal Engineers

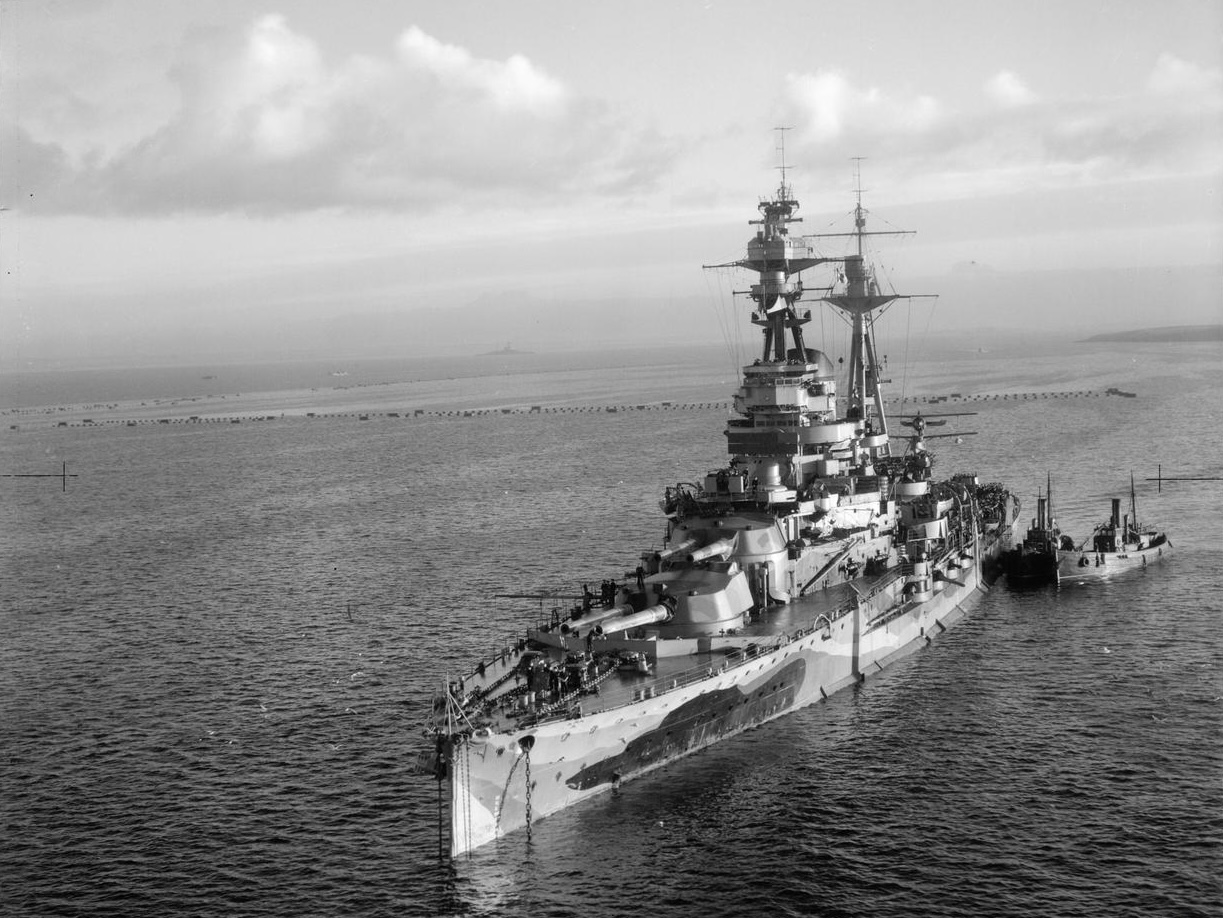
British battleship Resolution

=== Royal Navy ===
- 4 battleships – HMS Resolution, Rodney, Valiant and Warspite
- 2 battlecruisers – HMS Renown and Repulse
- 3 aircraft carriers – HMS Ark Royal, Furious and Glorious (sunk 8 June)
- 5 heavy cruisers – HMS Berwick, Devonshire, Effingham (grounded 17 May, lost), Suffolk (beached 17 April) and York
- 5 light cruisers – HMS Birmingham, Glasgow, Manchester, Sheffield, and Southampton
- 5 light cruisers – HMS Arethusa, Aurora, Enterprise, Galatea and Penelope (grounded 11 April, damaged)
- 6 anti-aircraft cruisers – HMS Cairo (damaged 28 May), Calcutta, Carlisle, Coventry, Curacoa (damaged 24 April) and Curlew (sunk 26 May)
- 7 Tribal-class destroyers – HMS Afridi (sunk 3 May), Bedouin, Cossack, Eskimo, Gurkha (sunk 9 April), Punjabi and Zulu
- 14 destroyers – HMS Acasta (sunk 8 June), Ardent (sunk 8 June), Forester, Foxhound, Glowworm (sunk 8 April), Hardy (sunk 10 April), Havock, Hero, Hostile, Hotspur, Hunter (sunk 10 April), Icarus, Kimberley, Wolverine
- 4 sloops – HMS Auckland (damaged 20 April), Bittern (sunk 30 April), Black Swan, Flamingo, Fleetwood, Stork,
- 17 submarines – including HMS Sterlet (sunk c. 18 April), Tarpon (sunk 10 April), Thistle (sunk 10 April), Seal (captured 5 May)
- ?? minesweepers

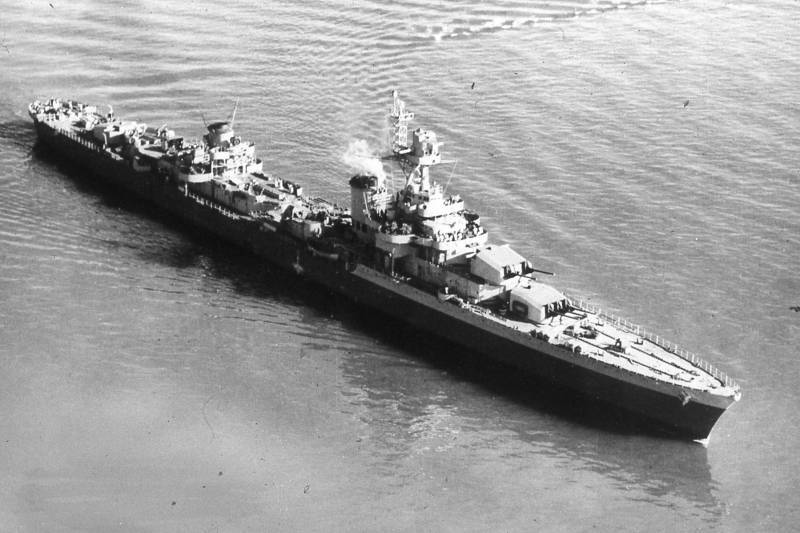
French cruiser Émile Bertin

=== French Navy ===
- 2 cruisers – Émile Bertin and Montcalm
- 4 auxiliary cruisers – El Djezaïr, El Mansour, El Kantara, Ville d'Oran
- 9 destroyers – Bison (sunk 3 May), Tartu, Maillé Brézé, Chevalier Paul, Boulonnais, Milan, Épervier, Brestois, Foudroyant
- 17 transport ships – Ville d'Alger, Djenné, Flandre, Président Doumer, Chenonceaux, Mexique, Colombie, Amiénois, Saumur, Cap Blanc, Château Pavie, Saint Firmin, Albert Leborgne, Paul Émile Javary, Saint Clair, Vulcain, Enseigne Maurice Préchac
- 1 submarine – Rubis

=== Polish Navy in exile ===
- 3 destroyers – ORP Błyskawica, Burza, Grom (sunk 4 May)
- 1 submarine – ORP Orzeł (sunk 8 June)
- 3 troopships – Chrobry (damaged later scuttled 16 May), Sobieski, Batory

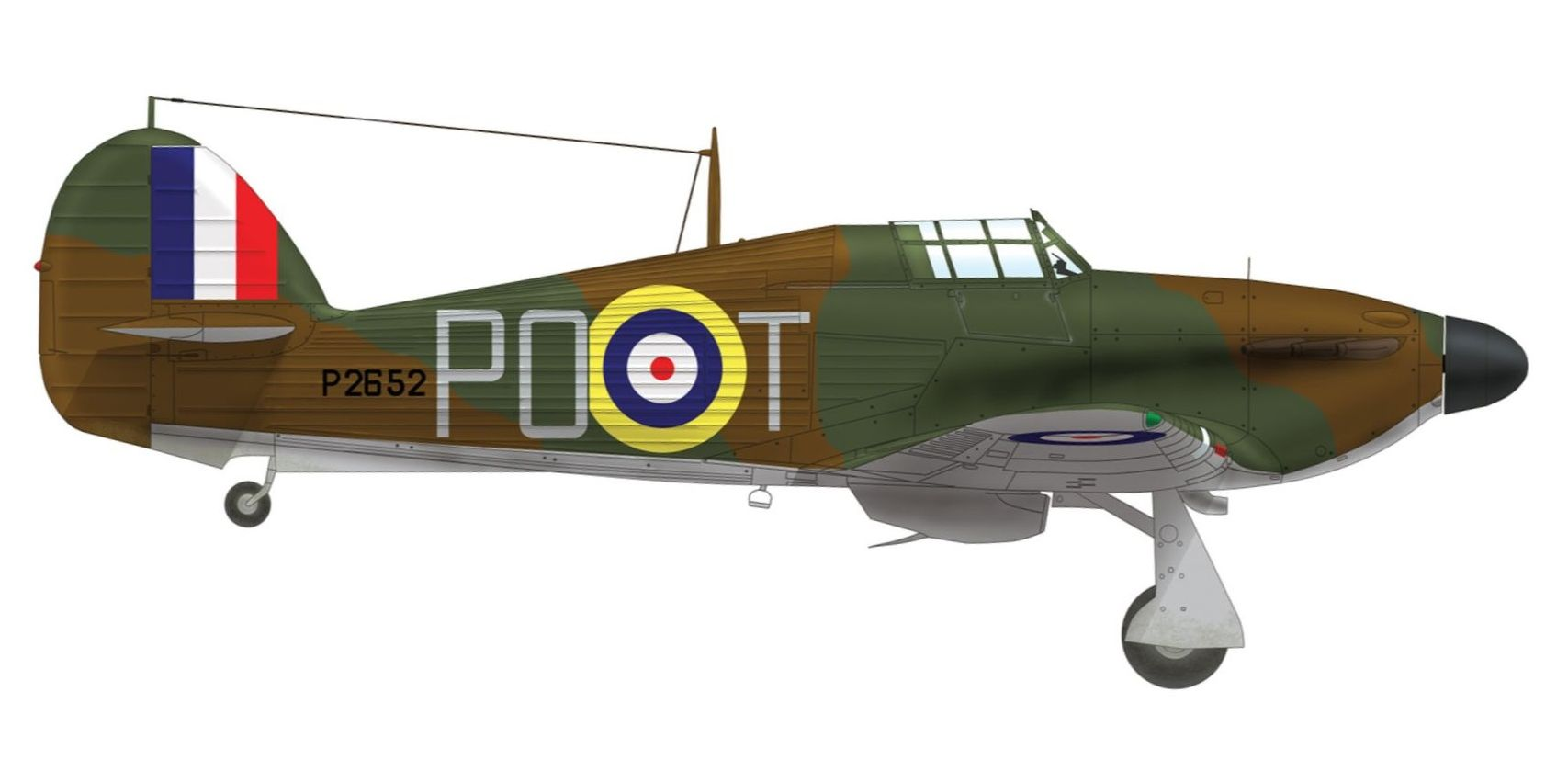
British Hurricane fighter

=== Royal Air Force (deployed to Norway) ===
- No. 263 Squadron RAF – Gloster Gladiator fighter aircraft
- No. 46 Squadron RAF – Hawker Hurricane fighter aircraft
