= HNoMS Glommen =

HNoMS Glommen is the name of the following ships of the Royal Norwegian Navy:

- HNoMS Glommen (1864), a steam powered gunboat
- HNoMS Glommen (1916), lead Glommen-class minelayer

== See also ==
- Glommen (disambiguation)
- HNoMS Glomma
