= 71st Heavy Anti-Aircraft Regiment =

71st Heavy Anti-Aircraft Regiment may refer to:

- 71st Heavy Anti-Aircraft Regiment, Royal Artillery, a Regular British Army unit formed in 1947
- 71st (Forth) Heavy Anti-Aircraft Regiment, Royal Artillery, a Scottish Territorial Army unit formed in 1938
