= Glommen =

Glommen may refer to:

- the Swedish name for Glomma, Norwegian river
- Glommen, locality in Falkenberg Municipality, Sweden
- Glommen (newspaper), named after the river
- HNoMS Glommen, ships in the Royal Norwegian Navy
