= Ole Dehli =

Norwegian jurist (1851–1924)

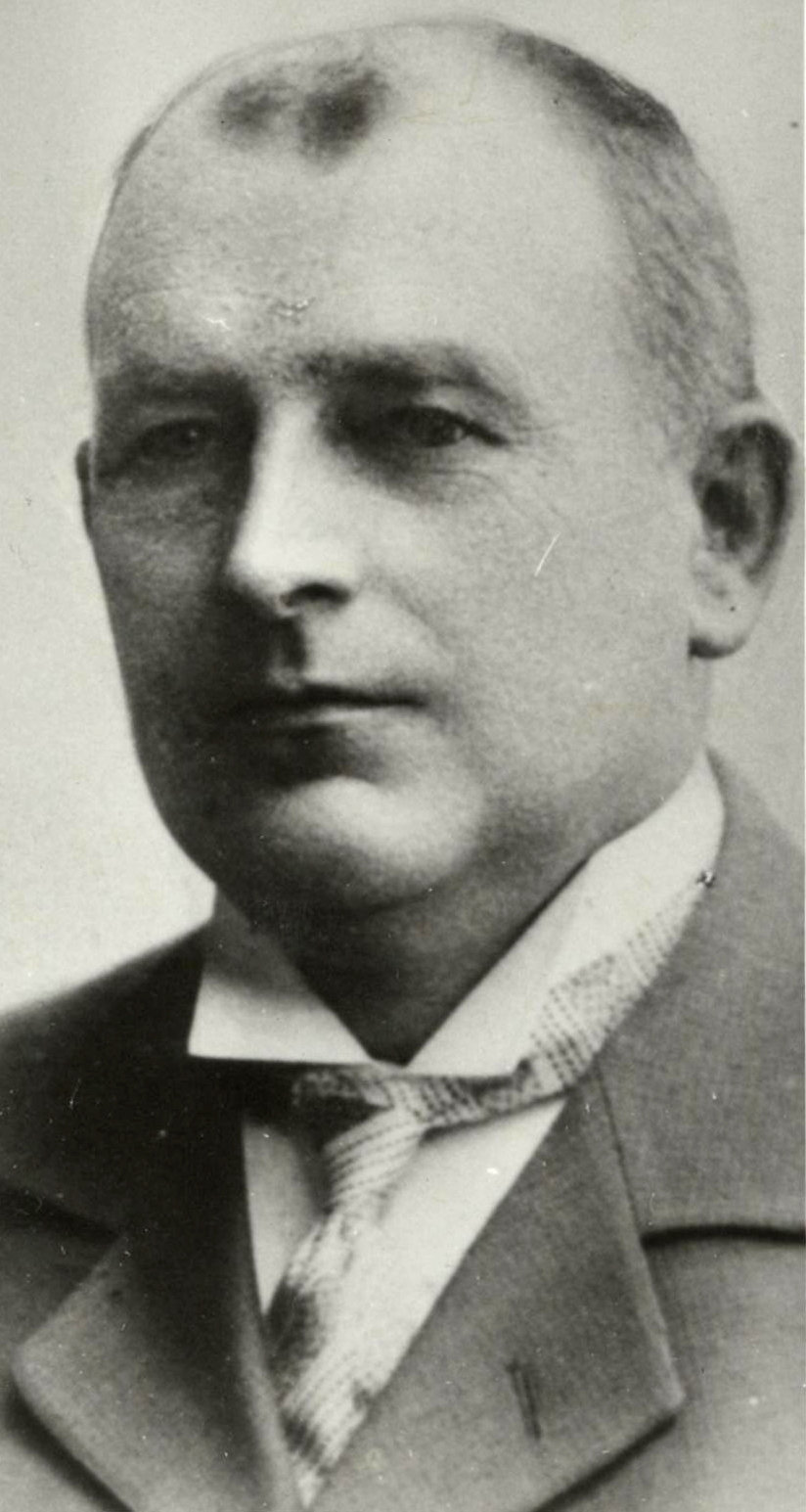
- Born: 8 May 1851; Furnes Municipality, Norway
- Died: 27 February 1924 (aged 72)
- Occupations: Jurist; Organizational leader
- Children: Halfdan Gyth Dehli
- Relatives: Jacob Ager Laurantzon (son-in-law)

Ole Dehli (8 May 1851 – 27 February 1924) was a Norwegian jurist and organizational leader.

He was born on the Dehli farm near the village of Furnes in Furnes Municipality in Hedmark county, Norway. He was a son of farmers Hans Olsen Dehli (1816–1881) and Martha Larsdatter (1821–1882).

In October 1876 he married physician's daughter Maria Gyth (1851–1926). Their daughter Bergljot was married to Colonel Jacob Ager Laurantzon, making Ole Dehli a grandfather of agronomist Trygve Dehli Laurantzon, and another daughter Asta was married to priest Rolf Selvig. Their son Halfdan Gyth Dehli was known in aviation.

Ole Dehli was a co-founder of the organization Norges Kooperative Landsforening, and chaired the organization from 1906 to 1919.
