= HNoMS Laugen =

Norwegian mine-laying vessel

History

Norway
- Name: Laugen
- Namesake: Lågen River
- Builder: Akers Mek. verksted in Kristiania
- Launched: 1918
- Captured: by the Germans on 14 April 1940

Nazi Germany
- Name: NN 05
- Acquired: 14 April 1940
- Renamed: M 22
- Fate: Handed back to Norway after VE Day

Service record
- Operations: Occupation of Norway by Nazi Germany

Norway
- Name: Laugen
- Acquired: 1945
- Decommissioned: Decommissioned and sold to civilian interests in 1950
- Fate: Sold for scrapping in March 1978, bought by the Royal Norwegian Air Force in 1979 and expended as a target ship on 6 June 1979.

General characteristics
- Class & type: Glommen class minelayer
- Displacement: 351 tons
- Length: 42 m (137.80 ft)
- Beam: 8.5 m (27.89 ft)
- Draft: 2.1 m (6.89 ft)
- Propulsion: Two triple expansion steam engines with a total of 340 hp
- Speed: 9.5 knots (17.59 km/h)
- Complement: 39 men
- Armament: 2 × 76 mm (2.99 in) guns; 120 mines
- Notes: All the above listed info was retrieved from

The mine layer HNoMS Laugen was built for the Royal Norwegian Navy during World War I, as the lead ship of a two ship class. Her sister ship was Glommen.

She and her sister ship were kept in service until the German invasion of Norway in 1940. Laugen surrendered to the Germans on 14 April 1940, and like her sister ship was rebuilt as a floating anti-aircraft battery. She was returned to the Royal Norwegian Navy in 1945 and decommissioned in 1950.

Laugen was built at Akers mekaniske verksted in Kristiania. She was named after the river Lågen in southern Norway.
