= Trygve Dehli Laurantzon =

Norwegian agronimist and newspaper editor

- Born: 20 March 1903; Kristiania, Kingdom of Sweden and Norway
- Died: 21 May 1975 (aged 73); Hamar, Norway
- Occupations: Norwegian agronomist newspaper editor

Trygve Dehli Laurantzon (20 March 1903 – 21 May 1975) was a Norwegian agronomist and newspaper editor.

He was born in Kristiania as a son of Major General Jacob Ager Laurantzon (1878–1965) and Bergljot Dehli (1878–1968). On the maternal side he was a grandson of jurist and organizational leader Ole Dehli, and a nephew of Halfdan Gyth Dehli.

In 1928 he married Johanne Sandberg (1903–1985), a daughter of farmer, officer and politician Ole Rømer Aagaard Sandberg (1865–1925). As such he was a brother-in-law of Ole Rømer Aagaard Sandberg, farmer and MP from Furnes. Laurantzon died in May 1975 in Hamar.

During the German occupation of Norway he edited the magazine Norsk Jord from 1941 to 1945. During the last phase of the Second World War he edited the newspaper Nationen for two and a half months, and headed the collaborationist Quisling regime's Ministry of Agriculture for a short period from April to May 1945. In the legal purge in Norway after World War II he was convicted of treason and sentenced to fifteen years of forced labor, only to be released in 1950.
