= HNoMS Glomma =

Three ships of the Royal Norwegian Navy have borne the name HNoMS Glomma:

- HNoMS Glomma (M309) was a Bangor-class minesweeper launched in 1940 as HMS Bangor and renamed on transfer to Norway in 1945. She was stricken in 1961.
- HNoMS Glomma (M317) was a Sauda-class mine countermeasures vessel built as AMS-153 in the United States. She was transferred to Belgium as Bastogne in 1953, reverted to the United States control in 1966 and renamed on transfer to Norway. She was stricken in 1966
- HNoMS Glomma (M354) was an Alta-class minesweeper commissioned in 1997 and sold for in 2009

== See also ==
- HNoMS Glommen
