= HNoMS Glommen (1916) =

History

Norway
- Name: Glommen
- Namesake: Glomma River
- Builder: Akers Mek. verksted in Kristiania
- Launched: 1916
- Decommissioned: 14 April 1940
- Fate: Scuttled in 1944

General characteristics
- Class & type: Glommen class minelayer
- Displacement: 351 tons
- Length: 42 m (137.80 ft)
- Beam: 8.5 m (27.89 ft)
- Draft: 2.3 m (7.55 ft)
- Propulsion: 340 hp steam engine
- Speed: 9.9 knots (18.33 km/h)
- Complement: 35 men
- Armament: 2 × 76 mm (2.99 in) guns; 120 mines

The minelayer HNoMS Glommen was built for the Royal Norwegian Navy during World War I, as the lead ship of the two ship Glommen class of mine layers. Her sister ship was Laugen. Glommen and her sister ship were kept in service until the German invasion of Norway in 1940. Glommen surrendered to the Germans on 14 April 1940, and was rebuilt as a floating anti-aircraft battery. She was scuttled at Kirkenes in 1944 by the retreating Germans.

Glommen was built at Akers mekaniske verksted in Kristiania.

She was named after the Glomma - the longest and largest river in Norway.

== See also ==
- List of World War II ships of less than 1000 tons
