= 4th Division (Norway) =

Western Norway Unit in the period 1911 to 1940

The 4th Norwegian Division was an army unit of the Norwegian Army. It was in charge of defending the Hordaland. During the Second World War, the division had been mobilized to 6,361 soldiers and 551 horses. They fought in Vestland, defending Voss and securing the Bergen railway line. Having lost Voss soon after, they defended the Sognefjord until May 1940, when General Steffens ordered his troops to disband.

== General Steffens ==
Major General William Steffens had become part of the Norwegian forces in exile before becoming military attaché to the USSR in 1941.
