= Jacob Ager Laurantzon =

Norwegian military officer (1878–1965)

- Born: 7 January 1878; Eidsberg, Norway
- Died: 17 September 1965 (aged 87)
- Occupation: Military officer
- Children: Trygve Dehli Laurantzon
- Relatives: Ole Dehli (father-in-law)

Jacob Ager Laurantzon (7 January 1878 – 17 September 1965) was a Norwegian military officer with the rank of Major General.

He was born in Eidsberg Municipality to Thorbjørn Laurantzon and Catharine Berg. He married Bergljot Dehli, a daughter of barrister Ole Dehli, in 1878. They were parents to agronomist Trygve Dehli Laurantzon.

Laurantzon graduated as military officer in 1898, and studied at the Norwegian Military College from 1898 to 1891. He served as Captain in the field artillery from 1903, was Major in the general staff from 1926, and promoted Colonel in 1929, chief of the Trondheim regiment.

During the Norwegian Campaign in 1940, Laurantzon was in command of the 5th Division in Trondheim.

He died in Romedal in September 1965.
