= William Steffens =

Norwegian military officer (1880–1964)

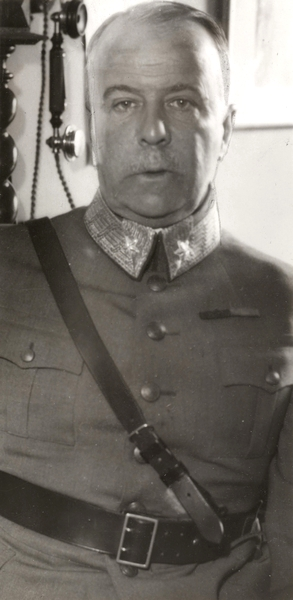
William Steffens, . 1935

William Steffens (5 November 1880 – 1964) was a Norwegian military officer, born in Christiania (now Oslo), Norway. He was Major General and commander of the Norwegian 4th Division from 1935. During the Norwegian Campaign in 1940 he was head of the armed forces in Western Norway. He was a delegate in Canada for the Norwegian government-in-exile in London in 1940 and 1941, and was military attaché in the Soviet Union from 1941 to 1945.

== Biography ==
Steffens became an officer in 1901. Four years later he was in the General Staff, after attending a military college. From 1925 to 1927 he was military attaché in Paris. He sat as a military expert on the committee that prepared disarmament in Geneva in 1930. In 1931, he became commander of Møre Infantry Regiment no. 11 (IR 11) at Molde. In 1932 and 1933, he was back in Geneva as a military expert, this time in the main negotiations on disarmament. In 1935, he became major general and commander of the 4th Division. At the same time, he became commander of Bergenhus fortress.
