= 5th Division (Norway) =

Norwegian Armed Forces' division

The 5th Division was a military formation of the Norwegian Army from 1916 until the 1940 Norwegian Campaign of the Second World War. It was charged with defending Romsdal and Trøndelag, with units participating in Dombås, Andalsnes, and Namsos. Jacob Ager Laurantzon was its commander.

The division was first established as the 5th Brigade in 1911, and changed its name to a division in 1916. It was the Norwegian Army's district organization in Møre og Romsdal and Trøndelag in the period 1911-1916 (as the 5th Brigade) and from 1916 to 1940 (as the 5th Division).

On April 9, 1940, the divisional commander, Jacob Ager Laurantzon, gave clear instructions that no battle should be fought against the Germans; he also wanted to report for the German commander in Trondheim. The latter was averted by county governor Håkon Five in Nord-Trøndelag; Five and Colonels Getz and Wettre had Laurantzon removed from the position on 27 April.

The 1st and 2nd Battalions of Infantry Regiment 11 garrisoned at Andalsnes, part of the 5th Division, before the German invasion, fought the German 7th Flieger Division during the Battle of Dombås (14-19 April 1940).

== Bibliography ==
- Richard D. Hooker Jr., and Christopher Coglianese "OPERATION WESERÜBUNG and the Origins of Joint Warfare", Joint Force Quarterly, accessible via JFQ, U.S. Department of Defense
