= Glommen-class minelayer =

Class overview
- Builders: Akers Mekaniske Verksted, Kristiania
- Operators: Royal Norwegian Navy
- Built: 1916–1918
- In commission: 1916–1950
- Completed: 2
- Lost: 1
- Scrapped: 1

General characteristics
- Type: Minelayer
- Displacement: 351 long tons (357 t)
- Length: 42 m (137 ft 10 in)
- Beam: 8.5 m (27 ft 11 in)
- Draft: 2.3 m (7 ft 7 in)
- Propulsion: Reciprocating steam engines, 340 shp (254 kW)
- Speed: 9.9 knots (11.4 mph; 18.3 km/h)
- Complement: 35 or 39 (sources disagree)
- Armament: 2 × 76 mm (3 in) QF guns; 120 mines

The Glommen-class was a class of two minelayers built for the Royal Norwegian Navy during the First World War at Akers Mekaniske Verksted in Oslo.

== Service history ==
The two vessels were kept in service until the German invasion of Norway in 1940. Glommen and Laugen operated in the area around Melsomvik, and surrendered to the Germans on 14 April 1940. The Germans rebuilt both of them as floating flak batteries, and renamed them Nki-01 and Nki-02.

Glommen was scuttled at Kirkenes by the retreating Germans in 1944, while Laugen was returned to the Royal Norwegian Navy in 1945, and decommissioned and sold for 23,100 kr in 1950.
