= Orm Jarl =

Orm Jarl was the name of five ships operated by Nordenfjeldske Dampskibsselskab.

- SS Orm Jarl (1888), in service 1913–19
- SS Orm Jarl (1922), lost in a collision in 1939
- SS Orm Jarl (1938), in service 1947–58
- MV Orm Jarl (1961), in service 1961–66
- MV Orm Jarl (1967), in service 1967–69
