= Nor-Cargo =

Norwegian cargo transport company

Nor-Cargo AS
- Type: Subsidiary
- Industry: Transport
- Founded: 1979
- Founder: Bergenske Dampskibsselskab; Nordenfjeldske Dampskibsselskab; Vesteraalske Dampskibsselskap
- Headquarters: Oslo, Norway,
- Area served: Northern Europe
- Key people: Erik Johannessen (CEO); Arne Inge Bjørndahl (Chairman)
- Revenue: NOK 3.9 billion (2006)
- Operating income: NOK 125 million (2006)
- Net income: NOK 87 million (2006)
- Number of employees: 1,300 (2007)
- Parent: Posten Norge
- Website: norcargo.no

Nor-Cargo AS is a Norwegian cargo transport and logistics company and subsidiary of Posten Norge, the Norwegian Postal Service. It operates road, water and air transport. The company operates through 32 Terminals with 1,000 long-distance and 600 distribution trucks. In addition, the division Nor-Cargo Thermo operates 500 temperature-controlled trucks.

== History ==
The predecessor of Nor-Cargo was established in 1967 when Be-No-Ve samseilingen was established by Bergenske Dampskibsselskab, Nordenfjeldske Dampskibsselskab and Vesteraalske Dampskibsselskab. Four years later Ofotens Dampskibsselskab, Narvik Dampskibsselskab and Nordlandske Dampskibsselskab also joined. This was a cooperation between the shipping companies. In 1979 this was taken one step further when Nordsjørederiet Nor-Cargo A/S was founded.

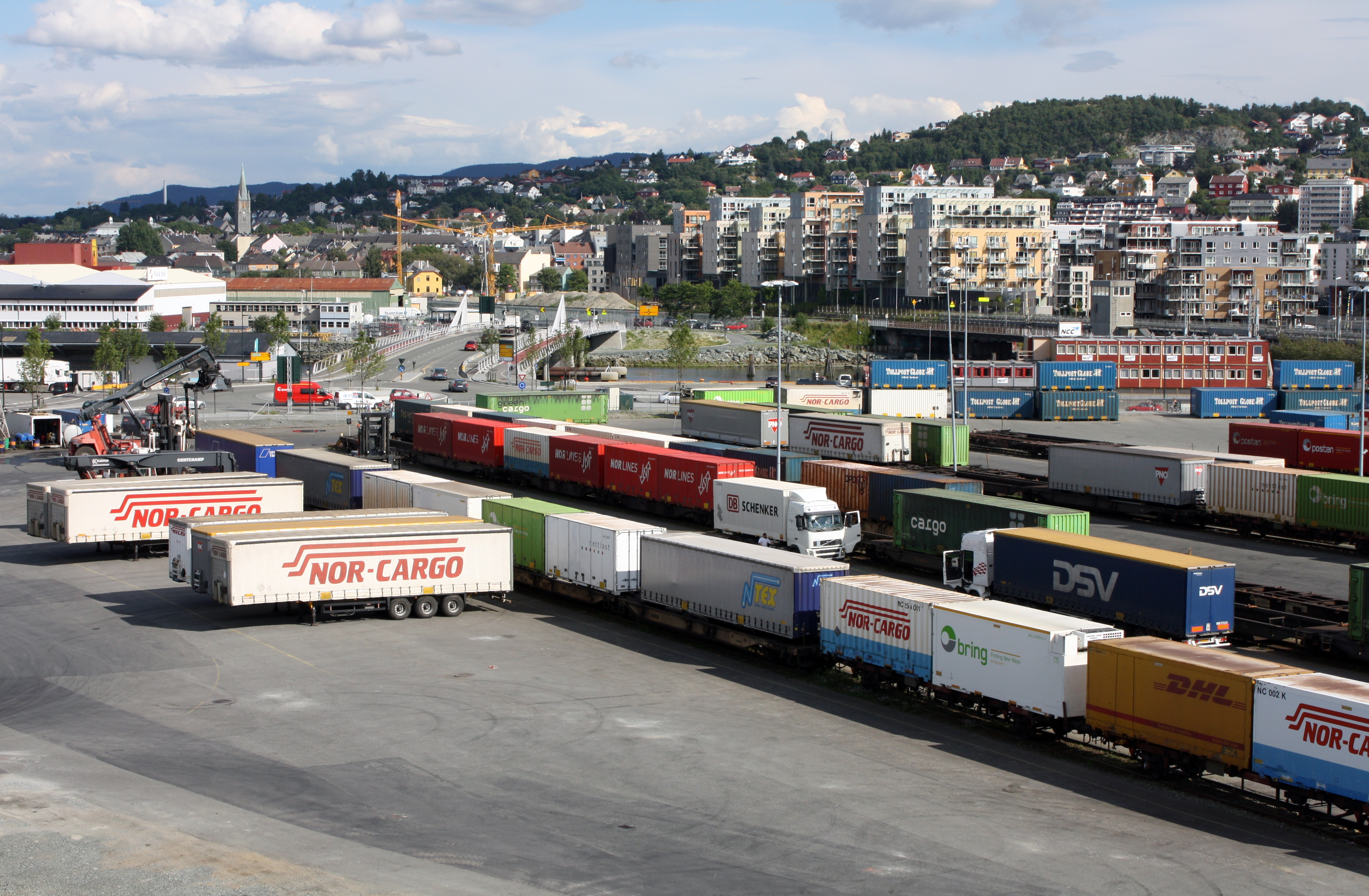
Nor-Cargo containers in Trondheim.

By 1985 this company was operating 16 short sea vessels through the company K/S Nord-Poolen. In 1988 the company RoNoTro A/S was established, and it purchased Bergenske, including the shipping companies K/S Nor-Cargo, Nordenfjeldske, the road transport companies Norske Godslinjer and the thermal transport company Sties Termo-Transport and the air cargo company NECAS, from Kosmos. By 1993 these companies had merged to one. The company continues to purchase a number of transport companies throughout the country, including many Nor-Cargo branded transport companies. In 1999 the company was renamed Nor-Cargo ASA before getting its present name in 2004 when it is purchased entirely by Posten from the previous owners Det Stavangerske Dampskibsselskap and Ofotens og Vesteraalens Dampskibsselskab. In 2005 Nor-Cargo also bought the road company HSD Transport.

In 2006 Nor-Cargo strengthened their position on the European continent by buying Scanex in Zwijndrecht, the Netherlands.

Scanex had been functioning as agent for Nor-Cargo since 1989.

Nor-Cargo opened an office in Houston, Texas in 2007 under President Sten Svendsen.
