= Able seaman =

Unlicensed member of the deck department of ship

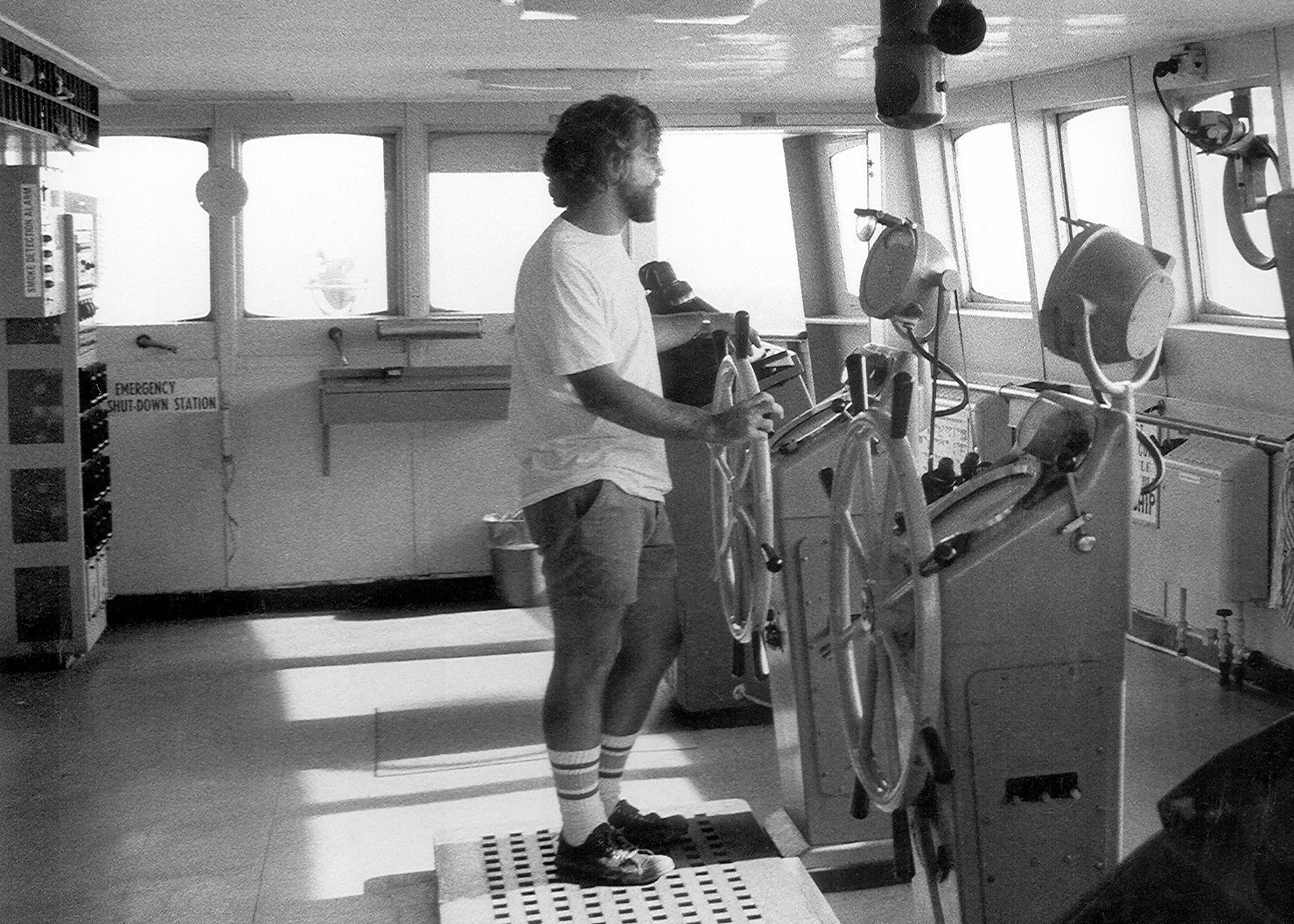
- Able seamen generally serve as a ship's helmsmen, relying on visual references, compasses, and a rudder angle indicator to steer a steady course as directed by the mate or other officer on the bridge.

General
- Other names: Able rate
- Department: Deck department
- Reports to: boatswain, chief mate
- Licensed: No
- Duties: To be able at a moment's notice
- Requirements: Able seaman's certificate

Watchstanding
- Watch (at sea): Helmsman, Lookout (varies)
- Watch (in port): Varies (varies)

An able seaman (AB) is a seaman and member of the deck department of a merchant ship with more than two years' experience at sea and considered "well acquainted with his duty". An AB may work as a watchstander, a day worker, or a combination of these roles. Once a sufficient amount of sea time is acquired, then the AB can apply to take a series of courses/examinations to become certified as an officer.

== Watchstander ==
At sea an AB watchstander's duties include standing watch as helmsman and lookout. A helmsman is required to maintain a steady course, properly execute all rudder orders and communicate using navigational terms relating to heading and steering. A watchstander may be called upon to stand security-related watches, such as a gangway watch or anchor watch while the ship is not underway.

== Dayworker ==
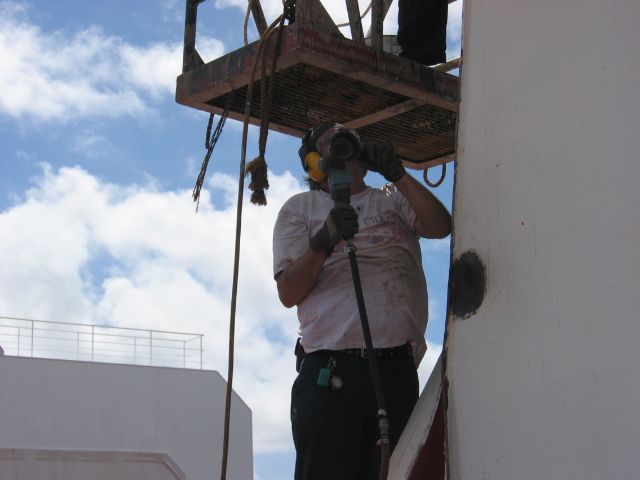
Dayworker AB preparing a mast for painting

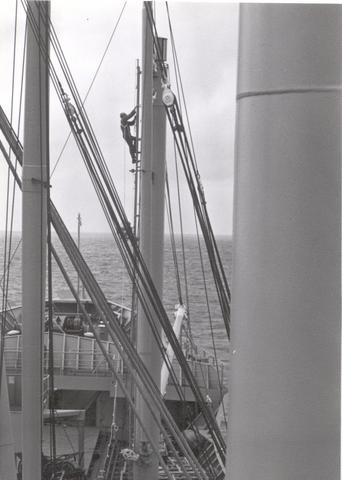
Knowing how to safely work aloft to maintain cargo rigging is a skill required of an AB.

An AB dayworker performs general maintenance, repair, sanitation and upkeep of material, equipment, and areas in the deck department. This can include maintenance of the ship's metal structures such as chipping, scraping, cleaning, priming, and painting. Areas frequently in need of such maintenance include the hull, decks, superstructure, cargo gear, and smoke stack. Dayworkers also frequently perform maintenance on lifeboats, rescue boats and life rafts, and emergency and damage control gear. For many vessels, being a dayworker is a position granted to senior ABs, since it generally allows more time for rest and relaxation.

== General duties ==
An AB may be called on to use emergency, lifesaving, damage control, and safety equipment. Able seamen perform all operations connected with the launching of lifesaving equipment. An AB is expected to be able to operate deck machinery, such as the windlass or winches while mooring or unmooring, and to operate cargo gear.

Able seamen require advanced training, including lifeboatman certification.

The ship's boatswain, if carried, is typically a senior AB. The boatswain is in charge of the able seamen and ordinary seaman that comprise the unlicensed deck crew, and reports directly to the chief mate.

== Certification ==
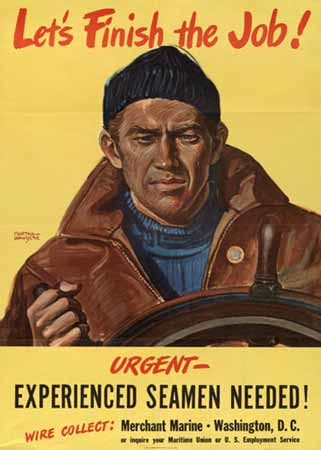
ABs were in high demand during World War II.

The Code of Federal Regulations establishes in 46 CFR 12.05 five categories of able seaman for the United States Merchant Marine:

1. Able Seaman—Any Waters, Unlimited. Requires three years service on deck on vessels operating on the oceans or the Great Lakes.
2. Able Seaman—Limited. Requires 18 months service on deck in vessels of 100 gross tons or more which operate in a service not exclusively confined to the rivers and smaller inland lakes of the United States.
3. Able Seaman—Special. Requires 12 months service on deck on vessels operating on the oceans, or the navigable waters of the United States including the Great Lakes.
4. Able Seaman—Special (OSV). Requires six months service on deck on vessels operating on the oceans, or the navigable waters of the United States including the Great Lakes.
5. Able Seaman—Sail. Requires six months service on deck on sail or auxiliary sail vessels operating on the oceans or the navigable waters of the United States including the Great Lakes.

Time served in certain training programs and school ships may be substituted for the time of service listed above. Special certificates of service are available for able seaman, Great Lakes—18 months service; able seaman, any waters—12 months; able seaman, tugs and towboats—any waters; able seaman, bays and sounds—12 months, vessels 500 gross tons or less not carrying passengers; and able seaman, seagoing barges—12 months.

=== Examination requirements ===
For the United States Merchant Marine, the Code of Federal Regulations establishes in 46 CFR 12.05 examination requirements for the certification of able seamen, which includes:

- Competence as a lifeboatman, including showing
1. training in all the operations connected with the launching of lifeboats and liferafts, and in the use of oars;
2. acquaintance with the practical handling of boats; including the ability to command the boat's crew.
- An examination, conducted only in English, consisting of questions regarding:
1. lifeboats and liferafts, the names of their essential parts, and a description of the required equipment;
2. the clearing away, swinging out, and lowering of lifeboats and liferafts, and handling of lifeboats under oars and sails, including questions relative to the proper handling of a boat in a heavy sea;
3. the operation and functions of commonly used types of davits;
4. knowledge of nautical terms; boxing the compass, either by degrees or points; running lights, passing signals, and fog signals for vessels on the high seas, in inland waters, or on the Great Lakes depending upon the waters on which the applicant has served; and distress signals; and,
5. knowledge of proper response to commands for handling the wheel and knowledge of the use of engine room telegraph or bell-pull signals.
- In the actual demonstration, the applicant shall show ability by taking command of a boat and directing the operation of clearing away, swinging out, lowering the boat into the water, and acting as coxswain in charge of the boat under oars. The AB shall demonstrate ability to row by pulling an oar in the boat. The applicant shall also demonstrate knowledge of the principal knots, bends, splices, and hitches in common use by tying them.
- The applicant must demonstrate to the satisfaction of the officer in charge, marine inspection, knowledge of pollution laws and regulations, procedures for discharge containment and cleanup, and methods for disposal of sludge and waste material from cargo and fueling operations.

In 2004, studies indicate that a typical qualified Able Seaman (AB) sailing without an ITF contract might earn around $800 in total compensation; with an ITF contract total compensation is $1,300 per month.

== Notable able seamen ==
Some notable able seamen from the merchant service include:

- Perce Blackborow, stowaway and then AB on Shackleton's voyage to Antarctica
- John Brightman, Baron Brightman, an English Chancery barrister and ultimately a judge of the House of Lords
- Sean Connery, Scottish actor
- Joseph Conrad, Polish-British writer
- Joseph Curran, American labor leader
- Charles Lindley, Swedish Social Democrat and trade union activist
- Jack Lord, American actor
- Alan Villiers, Australian author, adventurer, photographer and master mariner

== Able seamen in fiction ==
- Tom Ayrton, fictional AB and quartermaster in Jules Verne novels
- Sailor Steve Costigan, a fictional AB created by Robert E. Howard
- Ben Jackson, fictional AB in sci-fi series Doctor Who
- James Jessop, AB and murder suspect in the 2011 video game L.A. Noire.
- Long John Silver, from the novel Treasure Island.
- Titty Walker, in Arthur Ransome's Swallows and Amazons series of children's novels.

== Able-bodied seaman ==
Some modern references claim that AB stands for able-bodied seaman as well as, or instead of, able seaman. Able seaman was originally entered using the abbreviation AB instead of the more obvious AS in ships' muster books or articles. Such an entry was likely to avoid confusion with ordinary seaman (OS). Later the abbreviation began to be written as A.B., leading to the folk-etymological able-bodied seaman. The "correct" term, able seaman, remains in use in legal documents, in seaman's papers, and aboard ship.

== See also ==
- Boatswain
- Deck department
- Ordinary seaman (occupation)
- Seafarer's professions and ranks
