= Komovi (disambiguation) =

Komovi may refer to:

- FK Komovi, a Montenegrin football club
- SS Komovi, a Yugoslav cargo ship in service 1965-67
- Komovi Mountains, a mountain range in Montenegro
