= SS Sirius (1885) =

Norwegian steam ship

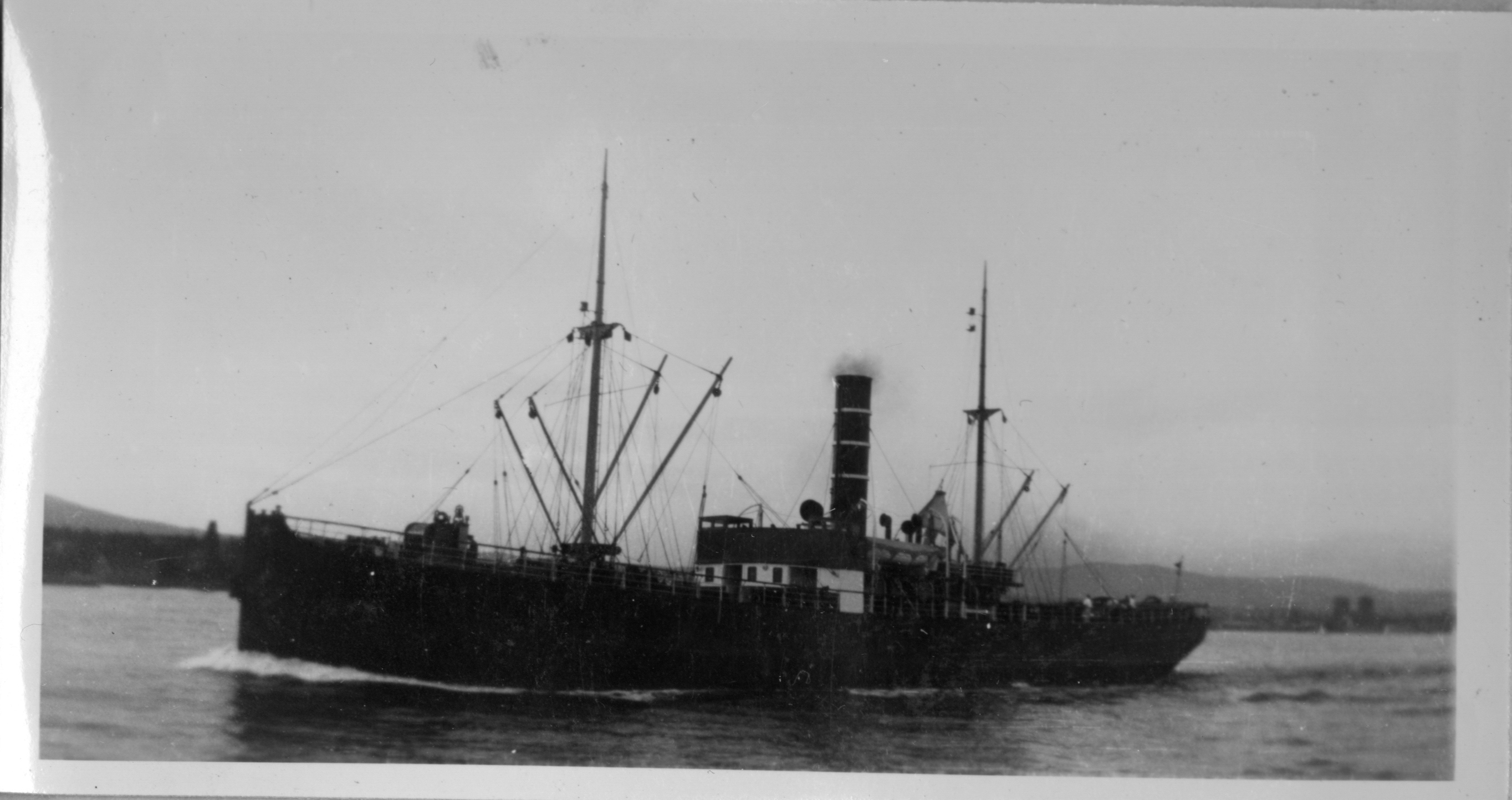
- Sirius near Oslo

History
- Name: Sirius
- Namesake: The star Sirius
- Owner: Bergen Steamship Company
- Port of registry: Bergen
- Route: Hamburg-Norway/coast of Norway (1885–1894); Hurtigruten (1894–1895); Hamburg-Norway/coast of Norway/; Norway-Iceland (1895-1927); Oslo-Finnmark (1927-1940)
- Builder: Flensburger Schiffbau-Gesellschaft, Flensburg, Germany
- Cost: 350,435 kr
- Yard number: 76
- Launched: 26 February 1885
- Completed: April 1885
- Identification: Code letters: JVTL; (1930); LEUS; (1934–1940)
- Fate: Sunk by a Luftwaffe bomber off Finnlandsneset, Dyrøya, on 18 May 1940

General characteristics
- Type: Passenger liner/Cargo liner (1885–1927); Cargo ship (1927–1940)
- Tonnage: As built: 877 gross register tons (GRT); After 1927 cargo ship conversion: 944 GRT; 534 net register tons (NRT)
- Length: As built: 191.2 feet (58.3 m); After 1908 rebuild: 207.5 feet (63.2 m)
- Beam: As built: 28.8 feet (8.8 m)
- Draught: As built: 20 feet (6.1 m)
- Installed power: As built: 700 indicated horsepower; After 1908 rebuild: 950 indicated horsepower
- Propulsion: As built: 1 two-cylinder compound steam engine; After 1908 rebuild: 1 triple expansion steam engine
- Speed: 10 knots (19 km/h; 12 mph)
- Capacity: 70 passengers (before 1927 cargo ship conversion)
- Crew: 18 (1940)

SS Sirius was a Norwegian iron-hulled steamship built in Germany in 1885. Sirius spent over 55 years sailing with cargo, regular passengers and tourists between Norway and Europe, and on the Norwegian coast. In 1894-1895, she served a year on the Hurtigruten route on the coast of Norway, before reverting to her former duties.

Sirius was rebuilt twice, the final rebuild in 1927 converting her to a dedicated cargo ship, a role which she fulfilled for the rest of her existence. Following the 1940 German invasion of Norway, she was requisitioned by the Norwegian government and carried supplies for both the civilian authorities and the military until bombed and sunk by a German aircraft on 18 May 1940.

== Construction and characteristics ==
Sirius was built as yard number 76 at the Flensburger Schiffbau-Gesellschaft shipyard in Flensburg, Germany. Displacing 877 gross register tons (GRT), the iron-hulled steamship was launched on 26 February 1885. Sirius featured an overbuilt ("hurricane" or awning) deck, and was powered by a 700 indicated horsepower two-cylinder compound steam engine, propelling her at a speed of 10 knots (19 km/h; 12 mph). She was 191.2 feet (58.3 m) long, with a beam of 28.8 feet (8.8 m) and a draught of 20 feet (6.1 m). At completion, she was delivered in April 1885 to the Bergen Steamship Company in Bergen, Norway. Sirius, which had cost 350,435 kr to build, was one of four ships acquired by the Bergen Steamship Company around that time to replace the mid-19th century vessels then in service with the company. (Note: The three other ships acquired by the company in the 1880s and 1890s were Capella, Mira and Neptun.)

Sirius was divided into three passenger classes for 70 passengers, with 24 First Class cabins, 22 cabins in the Second Class and 24 in the Third Class section of the ship. The passenger accommodation was located at the main deck, while the cargo holds were situated afore and abaft of the engine room.

Sirius was named after the star Sirius, in keeping with Bergen Steamship Company's tradition of naming their ships after heavenly objects.

== Early service ==
The Bergen Steamship Company's initial use for Sirius was as a passenger/cargo vessel connecting the various ports of Norway with the North-German port city of Hamburg. In this regard, she sailed between Hamburg and Norwegian ports as far apart as Kristiansand and Vadsø.

She also carried tourists during the summer season. On one occasion in 1890, Sirius encountered the German royal yacht Hohenzollern I, carrying Emperor Wilhelm II on one of his cruises to Norway. As the two ships passed each other off Kristiansund, Sirius raised her flag and fired a salute gun in honour of the German emperor.

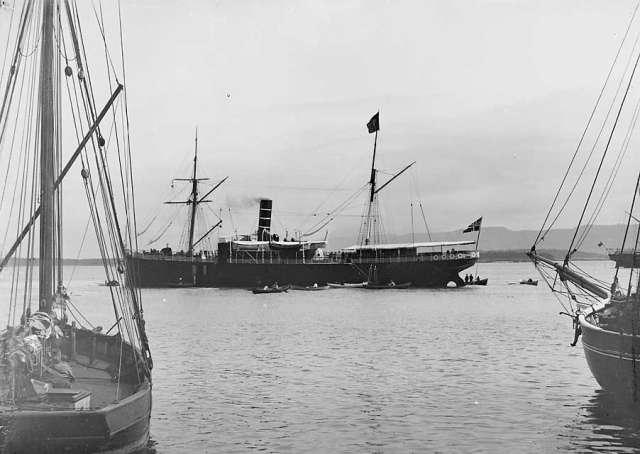
Sirius in Molde c. 1890

In 1890, following a great fire which destroyed large parts of the port city of Hammerfest, the Norwegian Internal Affairs Department despatched Sirius from Tromsø with 50 barrels of bread, butter, coffee and flour to Hammerfest as emergency aid.

== Hurtigruten service ==
In 1894, the year after businessman Richard With and his Vesteraalens Dampskibsselskab had pioneered the Hurtigruten coastal passenger/cargo route along the coast of Norway, fulfilling a government contract with his steamer Vesteraalen, the Bergen Steamship Company and Nordenfjeldske Dampskibsselskab gained a joint four-year contract to sail the route. While Nordenfjeldske employed the brand-new Erling Jarl, the Bergen Steamship Company used four older ships on the route. The two companies were to sail the route alternate years. The first voyage of the new business venture began on 3 July 1894, when Sirius set sail from north from Trondheim. During the summer season the route transported goods and passengers between ports from Trondheim to Hammerfest, while the winter route only went as far north as Tromsø. (Note: The three other ships initially employed on Hurtigruten service by the Bergen Steamship Company were Capella, Jupiter and Orion.)

Sirius ended her stint on the Hurtigruten route on 1 July 1895, when Nordenfjeldske stepped in in accordance with the contract. While on Hurtigruten service, Sirius had set out on her northbound route from Brattøra in Trondheim each Thursday at 08:00.

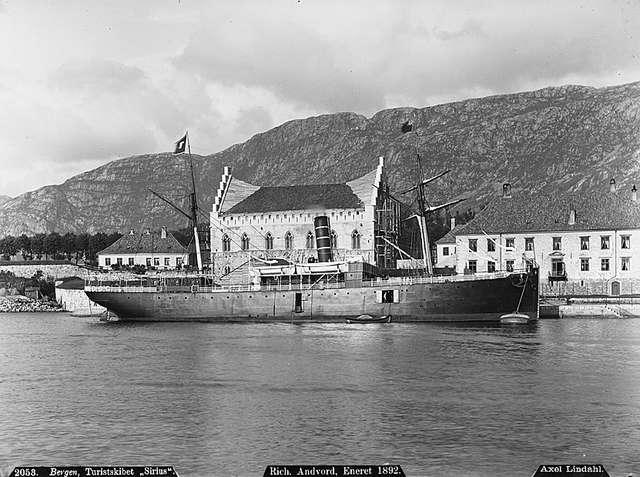
Sirius docked in Bergen, c. 1890

== Passenger/cargo and tourist service ==
Once finished with her year on the Hurtigruten service, Sirius returned to her Hamburg-Norway route. Every spring, she was taken out of service for cleaning and maintenance, before being employed as a tourist cruise ship on the coast of Norway during the summer season.

In 1896, Sirius had electric lighting installed, and in 1898 she stood in on the route from Bergen to Newcastle in England for ships undergoing maintenance.

== 1908 rebuild and continued traffic ==
In 1908, Sirius was taken out of service for a comprehensive rebuild. Laxevaag Maskin- og Jernskipsbyggeri in Bergen carried out the work on Sirius, increasing her length to 207.5 feet (63.2 m). The rebuilding also saw the replacement of her two-cylinder compound steam engine with a 950 indicated horsepower triple expansion steam engine.

Following the rebuild, Sirius was employed both on her previous passenger/cargo routes, and on a route between Norway and Iceland. The route between Hamburg and Norway sailed by Sirius and other ships was interrupted by the First World War in 1914–18, and was resumed as a reduced service between Hamburg and Bergen in 1918. By 1918, Sirius was an old and rat-infested ship, barely fit for passenger transport, and was replaced on the route by newer vessels.

== Cargo ship conversion ==
In 1927, Sirius had further rebuilding carried out. The rebuild, which cost 108,000 kr, saw the removal of her passenger accommodation and a conversion to carry only cargo. Twelve cabins were retained, although not used for regular passenger traffic. As a cargo ship, she had a tonnage of 944 gross register tons (GRT) (534 net register tons (NRT)). For the rest of her career, she carried cargo between the Norwegian capital city of Oslo and Norway's northernmost county, Finnmark. By 1930, she had been assigned the code letters JVTL, and had Wireless radio on board. In 1934, the code letters were changed to LEUS and remained so for the remainder of the ship's life.

== Second World War ==
=== German invasion ===
When Germany invaded neutral Norway on 9 April 1940, Sirius was located in Northern Norway. On 8 April, the day before the Germans launched their attack on Norway, she had left Narvik, bound for Tromsø. Along with other ships in the still-unoccupied areas of Norway, Sirius was requisitioned by the Norwegian authorities to support the war effort against the Germans. Following her requisition, Sirius sailed as a supply ship for the Norwegian civilian authorities and military in Northern Norway. In all, the Norwegian government requisitioned 30 ships during the April–June fighting in Norway, of which six were sunk by the Germans.

=== Sinking ===
On 18 May, Sirius was on her way from Tromsø to Risøyhamn to retrieve a number of requisitioned civilian motor vehicles. The vehicles were destined for Helgeland further south in Northern Norway, where Norwegian forces were opposing advancing German units. Sirius sailed in ballast, having unloaded a cargo of hay at Røsneshavn after departing Tromsø. She had left Røsneshavn in the morning of 17 May 1940. Sirius was under instructions to use an outer route off the island of Senja, but due to misunderstandings was sailing close to the coast, where German bombers were regularly patrolling.

In the late evening of 18 May, Sirius was spotted by a German bomber aircraft He 111 in the strait Solbergfjorden off Finnlandsnes on Dyrøya in Troms county. The bomber, flown by Hauptmann and later Ritterkreuzträger Robert Kowalewski (Stabsstaffel/Korpsführungskette/X. Fliegerkorps), who was assisted by his observer Fliegerführer Drontheim Major i. G. Martin Harlinghausen, came from a westerly direction, and after first strafing Sirius, the German aircraft attacked with seven bombs, and despite evasive manoeuvring by the Norwegian vessel, hit Sirius with two of them, sinking her. The first bomb hit the bow area, while the second struck amidships, breaking the ship in two lengthwise, in what was described by eyewitnesses on shore as "opening up like a book". Seven crew members, including both the captain and the first mate, were killed in the sinking, while 11 survivors were rescued from the water by local people in rowing boats. The survivors, who had been strafed in the water by the German aircraft, were later retrieved by the submarine tender Lyngen and the local steamer Mosken and brought to Harstad.

The wreck of Sirius lies north of Dyrøya, at depths between 45 metres (148 ft) and 75 metres (246 ft).
