= SS Dronning Maud =

Four steamships have borne the name Dronning Maud, after the Norwegian Queen Maud:

- SS Dronning Maud (1906) was a 1,761-ton Danish passenger/cargo ship launched on 10 August 1906, by Burmeister & Wain, Copenhagen, Denmark. Renamed several times before being scrapped in Helsinki, Finland in 1967.
- SS Dronning Maud (1907) was a 1,102-ton Norwegian cargo ship completed in June 1907, by Laxevaag Maskin- og Jernskipsbyggeri, Bergen, Norway. Struck a mine laid by UC-1 and sank north-east of Southwold, England 1 September 1916.
- SS Dronning Maud (1917) was a 2,663-ton Norwegian cargo ship launched on 5 May 1917, by Fredrikstad Mekaniske Verksted in Fredrikstad, Norway. Torpedoed and sunk by U-34 on 22 April 1918, in the Mediterranean north of Béjaïa in French Algeria.
- SS Dronning Maud (1925) was a 1,489-ton Norwegian passenger/cargo ship launched on 8 May 1925, by Fredrikstad Mekaniske Verksted in Fredrikstad, Norway. Bombed and sunk by German aircraft off Gratangen Municipality, Norway on 1 May 1940.
