= SS Polarlys =

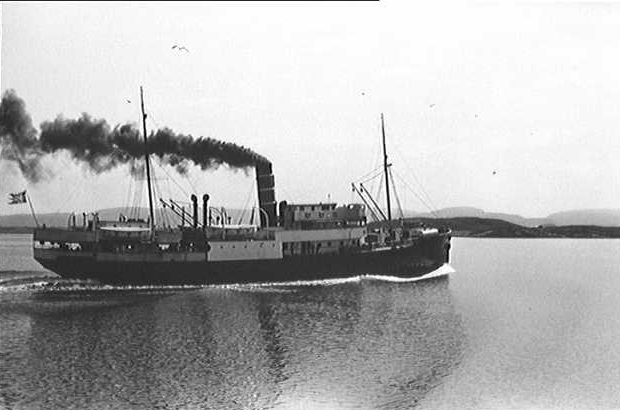
- SS Polarlys in 1938

History

Norway
- Name: Polarlys
- Namesake: Aurora
- Owner: Bergen Steamship Company
- Port of registry: Bergen
- Builder: Burmeister & Wain, Copenhagen
- Cost: 580,185 kroner
- Yard number: 282
- Launched: 10 January 1912
- In service: April 1912
- Out of service: October 1951
- Renamed: Sylvia, April 1952
- Identification: Call sign: MHFV / LEPY
- Fate: Sold, 1 July 1952

Norway
- Name: Valkyrien
- Namesake: Valkyrie
- Acquired: by purchase, 1 July 1952
- Commissioned: June 1953
- Decommissioned: 1963
- Refit: Bergen Mekaniske Verksted (1952-53)
- Fate: Scrapped, 1964

General characteristics (as built)
- Type: Coastal passenger/cargo ship
- Tonnage: 1,069 GRT; 536 DWT
- Length: 208 ft (63 m)
- Beam: 31 ft 6 in (9.60 m)
- Depth: 19 ft 8 in (5.99 m)
- Propulsion: Triple expansion steam engine, 1,473 ihp (1,098 kW)
- Speed: 13.45 knots (24.91 km/h; 15.48 mph)
- Capacity: 141 passengers: 65 × 1st class; 32 × 2nd class; 44 × 3rd class

SS Polarlys was a Hurtigruten coastal passenger/cargo steamer built in 1912. It was seized by the Germans during the Second World War, and served several stints in the Kriegsmarine. Having resumed her Hurtigruten service after the war until 1951, and in 1952 it was renamed Sylvia. At the same year, it was transferred to the Royal Norwegian Navy, and served under the name HNoMS Valkyrien as a motor torpedo boat tender between 1953 and 1963.

== Ship history ==
The ship was built by Burmeister & Wain at Copenhagen for the Bergen Steamship Company. She was designed for their coastal service, and as a replacement for the ship Astraea, which had sunk in January 1910. Named Polarlys ("Aurora"), the ship was launched on 10 January 1912, and delivered in April 1912.

At 1,069 gross register tons and 536 tons deadweight Polarlys was 208 feet long with 65 first class cabins, 32 second class, and 44 third class. Her triple expansion steam engines developed 1,473 IHP, and during sea trials she attained a maximum speed of 13.45 knots. She was refitted in 1930 and the number of cabins reduced.

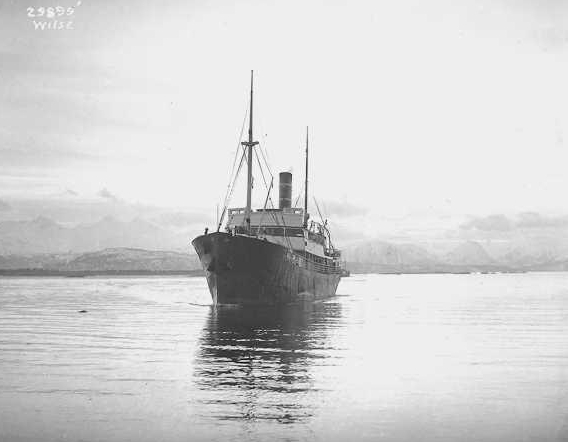
Polarlys arriving at Molde in 1927

Polarlys was in Bergen on 9 April 1940 when the Germans captured the town and was soon taken over by the Kriegsmarine for use as an accommodation ship. They painted the name Satan on the ship, but was later changed to simply Tan. She was returned to her owners in December 1940, but was requisitioned by the Germans once again in October and November 1944 for use as a troop transport as they retreated from northern Norway. In March 1945, the ship laid up at Stamnes in the Osterfjord and remained there until the end of the war in Europe.

After a refit Polarlys returned to the coastal service in July 1945. However she was now showing her age, and was withdrawn from service on 12 October 1951. Laid up in Bergen, she was renamed Sylvia in April 1952, releasing the name for a new ship which was built in Ålborg same year.

=== As Valkyrien ===
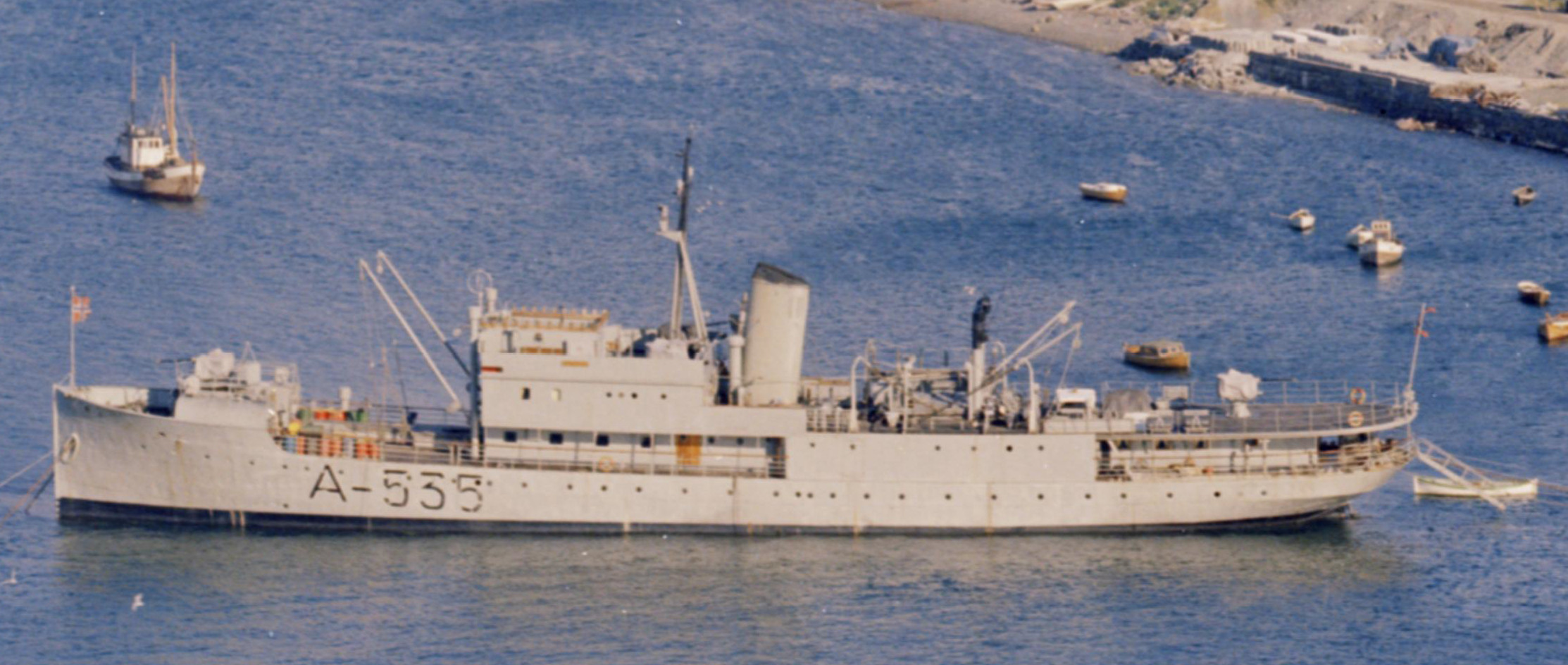
KNM Valkyrien in Alta

On 1 July 1952 the ship was bought by the Royal Norwegian Navy, converted to a motor torpedo boat tender at the Bergen Mekaniske Verksted yard at Laksevåg, and was commissioned as Valkyrien in June 1953.

In connection with a rescue operation in 1956 in the Arctic the ship was outfitted with a Bell helicopter. She had a displacement of 1,500 tons and a top speed of 12 knots (22 km/h; 14 mph). She had a crew of 76 and was armed with one 3-inch and three 40 mm guns.

She remained in naval service until 1963, and was sold for scrapping in Odense the following year.

=== In literary fiction ===
SS Polarlys was the backdrop of the first detective novel Georges Simenon (of Maigret fame) ever signed with his real name instead of a pseudonym. In this non-Maigret novel (French title Le Passager du Polarlys) the ship's captain (whose character is not unlike Maigret) has to turn detective after a German police investigator has been murdered on board his ship, in connection with the drug-related death of a young model in the Montparnasse painters and drop-outs Parisian community of the roaring twenties. The whole story unfolds during the trip from Hamburg (then the start of the Bergen Steamship Company arm of the Hurtigruten) to the northern Hurtigruten terminal in Kirkenes where the criminal commits suicide by jumping overboard, while his female accomplice (and sister) attempts escape to Soviet Union (then without extradition agreements with capitalist western countries).
