= HMY Alexandra =

Steamship

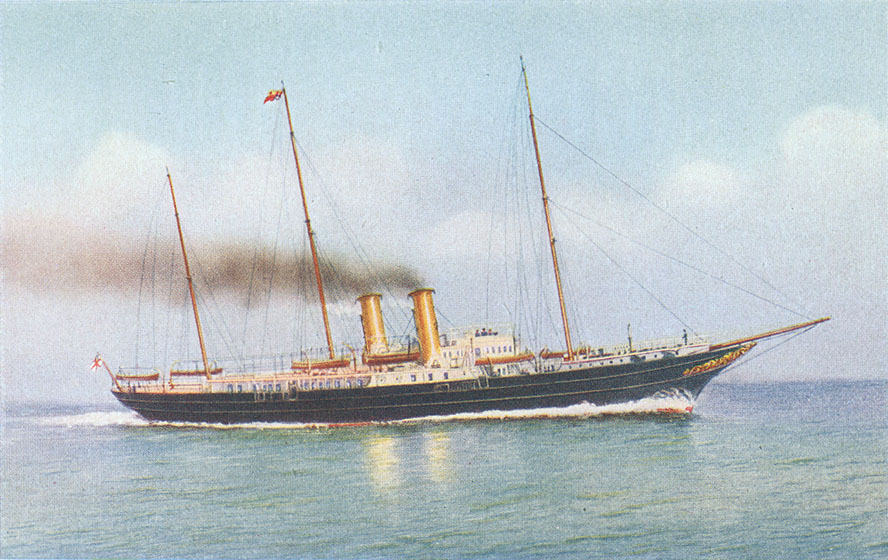
- HMY Alexandra

History

United Kingdom
- Name: Alexandra
- Namesake: Queen Alexandra of the United Kingdom
- Owner: His Majesty's Government
- Operator: Royal Navy
- Builder: A. & J. Inglis, Glasgow
- Yard number: 280
- Launched: 30 May 1907
- Completed: April 1908
- Maiden voyage: June 1908
- Out of service: June 1922
- Fate: Sold to the Norwegian shipping company Nordenfjeldske Dampskibsselskab in May 1925

Norway
- Name: Prins Olav
- Namesake: Prince Olav of Norway
- Owner: Nordenfjeldske Dampskibsselskab
- Port of registry: Trondheim
- Route: Coast of Norway/North Cape; cruises (1925–1930); Edinburgh–North Cape; (1930–1935); Hurtigruten (1937–1940)
- Cost: £25,000
- Acquired: May 1925
- Maiden voyage: Bergen–North Cape, beginning on 5 July 1925
- Refit: Fredrikstad Mekaniske Verksted (1925-1926); Trondhjems mekaniske Værksted (1936-1937)
- Identification: Code letters: LCVM
- Fate: Sunk by German bombers on 9 June 1940

General characteristics as built
- Type: Royal yacht (1908–1922); Hospital ship (c. 1914–1918); Cruise ship (1925–1935)
- Tonnage: 2,113 tons (gross); 1,135 tons (net)
- Length: 90 m (300 ft)
- Beam: 12.2 m (40 ft)
- Draught: 13 ft (4.0 m)
- Propulsion: Three Parsons turbines with 4,035 ihp
- Speed: 18 knots (33 km/h)
- Capacity: 100 passengers (after 1925 rebuild)

General characteristics after 1937 rebuild
- Type: Hurtigruten passenger/cargo; ship (1937–1940); Troop ship (1940)
- Tonnage: 2,147 tons (gross); 1,247 tons (net)
- Propulsion: 3,500 ihp four-cylinder compound engine
- Speed: 17 knots (31 km/h)
- Capacity: 450 passengers

HMY Alexandra was a steamship built as a British royal yacht, completed in 1908. Normally transporting Britain's royal family to European ports, Alexandra served as a hospital ship during the First World War. After 17 years of British service, she was sold to Norwegian commercial interests in 1925. Renamed Prins Olav, she was first used as a luxury cruise ship on trips to the North Cape, she was converted to take more passengers and cargo. In 1937 she began sailing as a Hurtigruten passenger/cargo ship along the coast of Norway. After being requisitioned by the Norwegian government following the 9 April 1940 German invasion of Norway, she transported troops for the Norwegian war effort. Prins Olav was sunk by German bombers on 9 June 1940, while attempting to escape to the United Kingdom as the Norwegian Campaign was coming to an end.

== Background ==
Alexandra was intended to supplement the larger British royal yacht Victoria and Albert, which had proven too large and unwieldy to carry out all her tasks satisfactorily. The contract for Alexandra's construction was the first for a royal yacht to be given through open competition, the assignment going to the experienced River Clyde shipbuilders A. & J. Inglis. The new ship was named for Queen Alexandra, the consort of Edward VII of the United Kingdom.

== Construction ==
Alexandra had yard number 280 and was launched on 30 May 1907 in Glasgow, Scotland. The ship's sponsor was Princess Louise, Duchess of Argyll, Edward VII's sister.

Completed in April 1908, Alexandra had a gross register tonnage of 2,113 tons, and a net register tonnage of 1,135 tons. She could achieve a speed of 18 knots (33 km/h) with her three Parsons turbines giving 4,035 ihp. She was 90 metres (300 ft) long between perpendiculars, with a beam of 12.2 metres (40 ft) and a draught of 13 feet (4.0 m). The ship featured a clipper bow, two funnels and three masts.

== British service ==
On her maiden voyage in June 1908, Alexandra struck a lock in the Kiel Canal, damaging her propeller.

In her service as a royal yacht, Alexandra was crewed by the Royal Navy. The ship often carried Edward VII on holidays to Biarritz and the Mediterranean, or to Germany. During the First World War Alexandra was used as a hospital ship. Following the First World War, Alexandra was rarely used, and was decommissioned in June 1922.

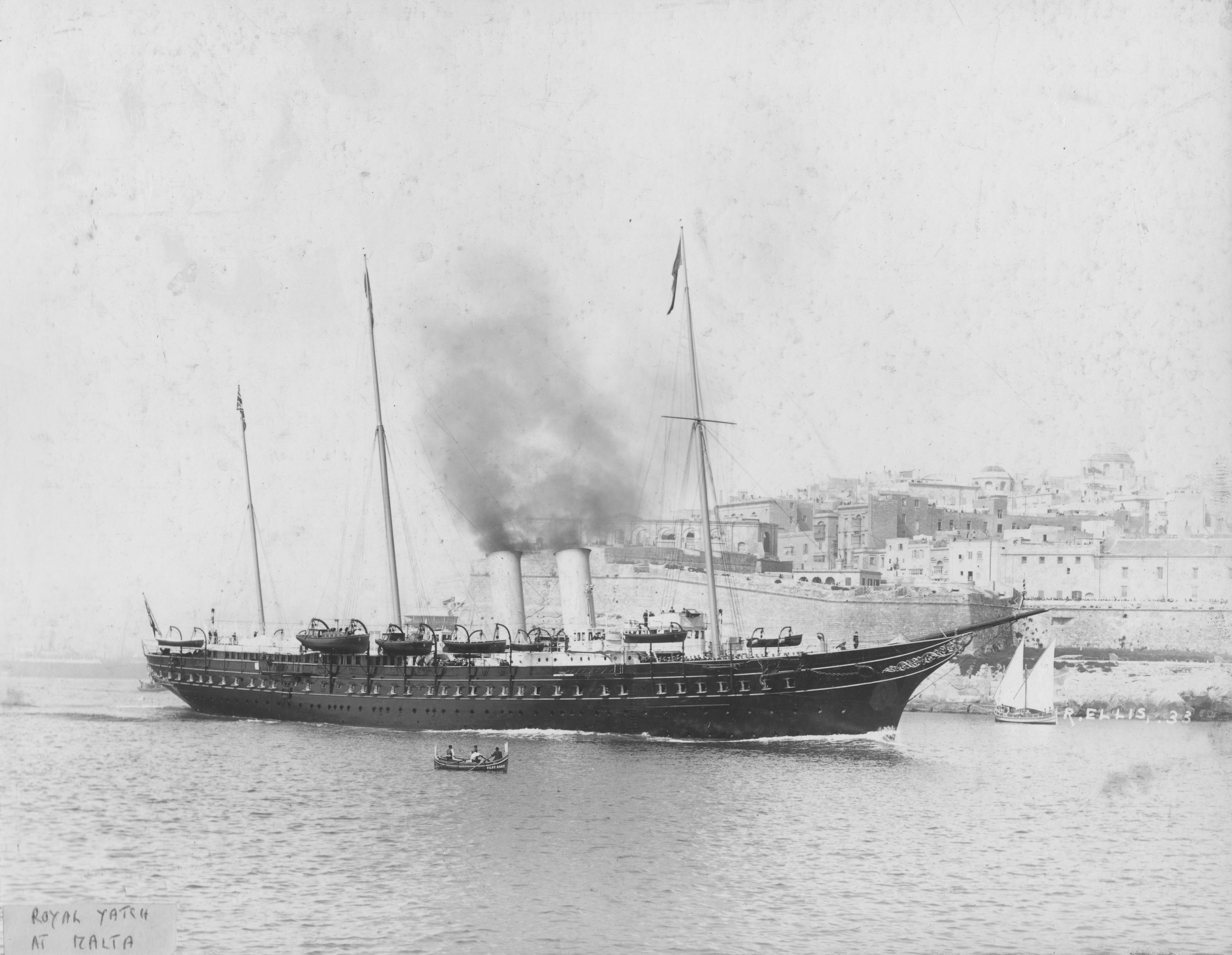
HMY Alexandra, Malta, 1911

== Norwegian career ==
In May 1925 she was sold to the Norwegian shipping company Nordenfjeldske Dampskibsselskab (NFDS) in Trondheim for £25,000. Nordenfjeldske Dampskibsselskab had suffered heavy losses to German U-boats during the First World War, and needed to replenish and expand its fleet.

Alexandra was renamed Prins Olav, after Queen Alexandra's Norwegian grandson. In Norwegian service she was assigned the code letters LCVM.

=== Cruise ship ===
The first years in Norway she was used as a luxury cruise ship. After a minor refurbishing in Trondheim, Prins Olav left for Bergen in Western Norway on 3 July 1925. Her maiden cruise voyage going from Bergen to the North Cape in Northern Norway began on 5 July 1925.

Following the conclusion of the 1925 summer season, Prins Olav was modified at the shipyard Fredrikstad Mekaniske Verksted in Fredrikstad from December 1925. The rebuild created accommodation for 100 passengers, while retaining the original royal quarters on the ship unaltered. Prins Olav served as an effective public relations tool for Nordenfjeldske. The ship was especially popular with foreign tourists, and together with the new-built steamer Dronning Maud she gave the company a dominating position in the tourist industry in Northern Norway.

Between 1926 and 1930 Prins Olav sailed on summer cruises on the Norwegian coast. In winter time, Prins Olav was mothballed, with the exception of 1928, when winter cruises in the Mediterranean were carried out, something which was repeated in 1935. In the seasons of 1930 to 1935 she cruised between Edinburgh in Scotland and the North Cape.

=== Hurtigruten ===
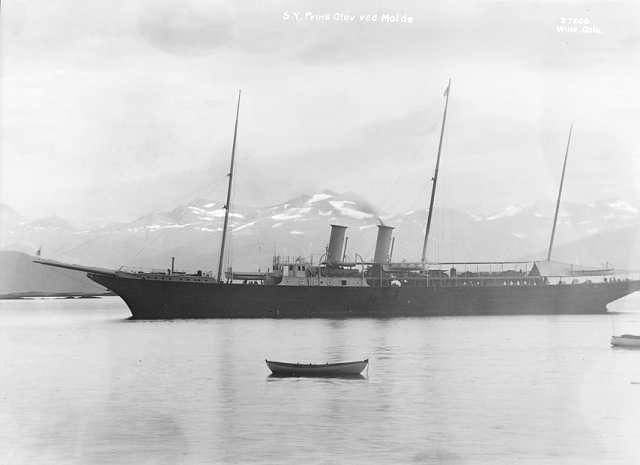
Prins Olav in the Norwegian port of Molde in 1925

In 1936 she was taken out of service for a complete rebuild at Trondhjems mekaniske Værksted and the Nordenfjeldske Dampskibsselskab's own repair yard Nordre Verft in Trondheim. As part of the 1936 Hurtigruten contract with the Norwegian government, Nordenfjeldske Dampskibsselskab had obligated itself to put a new ship into the service. Rather than building a new ship, Nordenfjeldske decided to rebuild Prins Olav for the Hurtigruten cargo/passenger service on the coast of Norway. The rebuild, which lasted until 27 May 1937, changed her tonnage to 2,147 gross register tons (1,247 net register tons). In her new configuration she had the capacity to carry 450 passengers, with 95 cabins in the First Class section and 145 cabins in the Third Class section. Much effort was put into providing good standards for the Third Class section. Her turbines were replaced with a 3,500 ihp four-cylinder compound engine, the largest steam engine built in Norway up to that point in time. The engine had been manufactured by the shipyard Fredrikstad Mekaniske Verksted, where Prins Olav had previously had modification work done. The new shape of Prins Olav included a single funnel, unlike the two she had had in her previous guise. While Prins Olav had featured two decks and a shelter deck prior to her rebuild, the rebuilt ship had an additional promenade deck and a cruiser stern.

The rebuilt ship, the largest and grandest in Hurtigruten service at the time, bore little exterior resemblance to the original royal yacht. Prins Olav was considered the flagship of the Hurtigruten service.

Some four months after completing her rebuild, Prins Olav ran aground off Brønnøysund in Nordland on 25 September 1937, having to be recovered by the salvage ship Traust.

The ship's royal connection continued in Norway. King Haakon VII of Norway had visited the ship shortly after her rebuild, and in March 1938 she transported the King, her namesake Crown Prince Olav and numerous officials and skiers to the 1938 Norwegian Skiing Championship in Mo i Rana.

== Second World War ==
The outbreak of the Second World War led to concerns in the Norwegian government with regards to the economy, and as a savings measure a decision to limit the Hurtigruten service from the ordinary seven sailings from Bergen a week to five was taken on 1 October 1939. After protests from the coastal population daily sailings were reintroduced on 5 December 1939.

=== Norwegian Campaign ===
When the Germans invaded Norway on 9 April 1940, Prins Olav was in the northern port of Harstad, having begun her north-bound route from Bergen on 1 April. Being in the part of Norway which initially avoided being occupied, Prins Olav was requisitioned to assist with the Norwegian mobilization effort. Serving as a troop ship from 11 April, she first transported Norwegian troops from the Lofoten region to Sørreisa in Troms, and later from Kirkenes in eastern Finnmark to Gratangen near the front lines at Narvik. In the latter mission Prins Olav transported two companies of the 1st battalion of Infantry Regiment 12, the rest of the battalion having been shipped out several days earlier on the Hurtigruten ships Dronning Maud and Kong Haakon, and the steamer Hestmanden. For the last stretch of their voyage, on 17 April, the Norwegian transports were escorted by the Norwegian patrol boat Heimdal.

After completing her troop carrying missions she was camouflaged with grey paint and hidden in a fjord in Finnmark. As the fighting in Norway neared its end with the Allied evacuation from the country following the German attack into France, the Norwegian authorities instructed Prins Olav's captain to sail west to the Faroe Islands.

=== Last voyage and sinking ===
On 7 June 1940 Prins Olav bunkered in the port of Hammerfest in western Finnmark, before sailing to Kågsund in Troms, where the Royal Norwegian Navy's chief of staff, Captain Gunnar Hovdenak, was organizing the evacuation of merchant vessels from Northern Norway to the United Kingdom. Prins Olav embarked Captain Hovdenak and steamed alone towards the Faroe Islands in the early morning on 8 June, attempting to join the last of the British evacuation convoys to have left Norway. While Prins Olav had been bunkering in Hammerfest, false rumours had been circulating in the civilian population of the town that King Haakon and his government were on board.

Initially, Prins Olav sailed in the company of the steamer Finmarken, but lost sight of the other vessel while temporarily changing course to order the Tromsø-bound steamer Ingerfire to redirect to Tórshavn on the Faroe Islands. (Note: Finmarken was later intercepted by German aircraft and forced to turn back to Norway.)

On 9 June Prins Olav caught up with the fellow Hurtigruten steamer Ariadne. The two unarmed Norwegian vessels sailed together throughout the day. At 22:30 the ships were discovered by six Luftwaffe Heinkel He 111 bombers from the II. Gruppe of Kampfgeschwader 26, despatched from Værnes Air Station near Trondheim to search for ships trying to escape from Northern Norway, and came under attack. After managing to avoid being hit for more than an hour by evasive manoeuvring at full speed, dodging 14 bombs, Prins Olav suffered a near miss which damaged her machinery and left her dead in the water. The crew abandoned ship while being strafed by the German aircraft. Shortly after the crew had boarded life boats and left the ship, Prins Olav was struck by two bombs in the stern and caught fire before later sinking at 67°07′N 01°00′E. One crew member was killed in the sinking, while four others were wounded. In all, 36 people survived the sinking of Prins Olav.

Ariadne, which had served as a hospital ship during the Norwegian Campaign but disembarked her medical personnel in Tromsø and had her red crosses painted over before departing, was also sunk by the German bombers, with the loss of nine lives. After the attack, the survivors of the two ships spent several hours in their life boats until rescued by the British destroyer HMS Arrow. Arrow had been despatched after the British evacuation convoy had received a partial emergency radio signal from Prins Olav before the latter ship's antenna was knocked out in the German bombing. The 81 survivors, nine of whom were female, of Prins Olav and Ariadne were landed at Scapa Flow on 14 June.

==== Aftermath ====
A hearing on the loss of Prins Olav and Ariadne was held on 24 June 1940 in Newcastle upon Tyne. The captain of Prins Olav, Reidar Mauseth, testified at the hearing that the German bombers had been intentionally strafing the survivors in the life boats. (Note: Reidar Mauseth was the captain of Prins Olav from her 1937 conversion to Hurtigruten service until she was sunk on 9 June 1940.)
