= Michael Krohn =

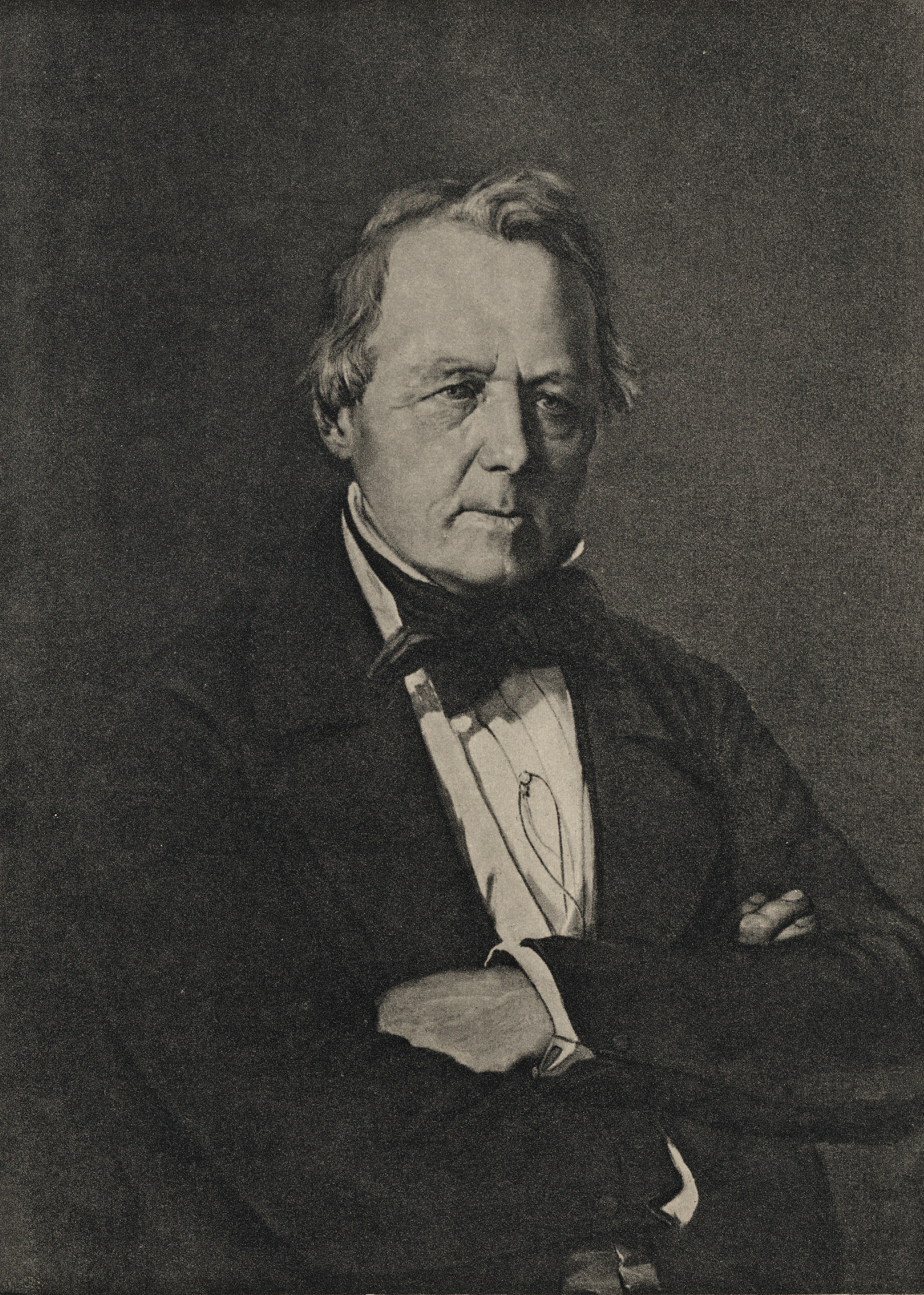
Michael Krohn (1793 - 1878)

Michel Krohn was born in 1793 in Bergen, Norway and died in 1878. He was a trader and was the driving force behind the foundation of several important companies in Bergen like: Det Bergenske Sjøforsikringsselskab (1845), Det Bergenske Dampskibsselskap (1851), Bergens Mekaniske Verksted (1855) and Bergens Privatbank (1855).

In 1829 Michael Krohn bought the estate Wernersholm at Hop outside Bergen, he then had the "paper" church "Hop Kirke" built by Werner Hosewinckel Christie taken down. In 1831 he had the current "Wernersholmveien 20" built as a place for recreation. In 1859 Bjørnstjerne Bjørnson was the guest of Michael Krohn at Wernersholm where Bjørnstjerne Bjørnson wrote parts of the Norwegian anthem Ja vi elsker. Later descendants of Michael Krohn includes dr. Med. Georg Herman Monrad-Krohn and the Norwegian computer entrepreneur Lars Monrad-Krohn.

Michael Krohn has a street named after him in Bergen, Michael Krohns Gate.
