= TS Leda =

Ship built 1952 for Norway - England route

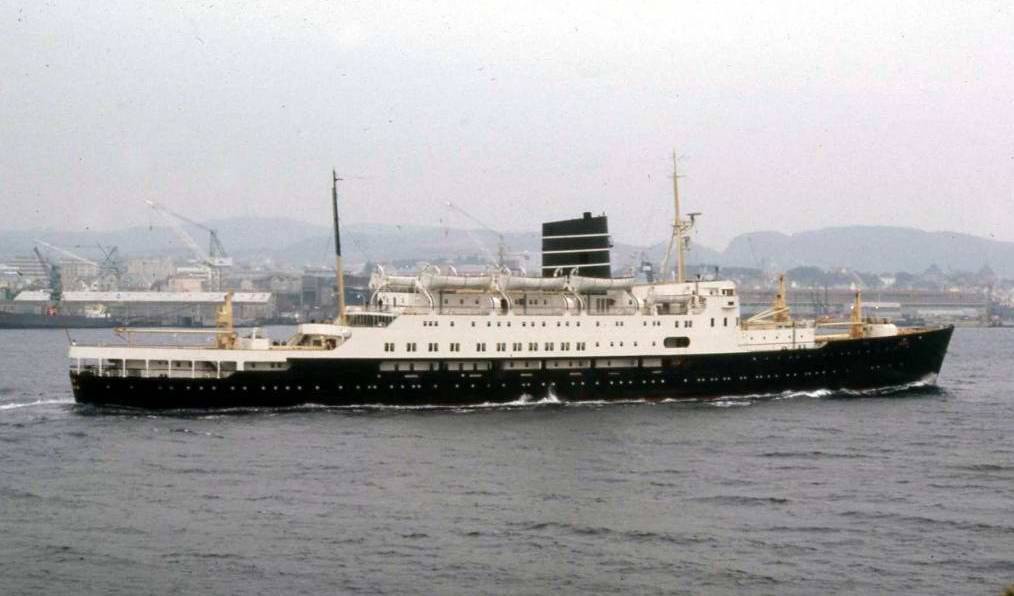
- TS Leda passing Haugesund, Norway, October 1973

History
- Name: Leda (1952-79); Najla (1979-81); Albatross (1981-84); Alegro (1984-85); Albatross (1985-88); Betsy Ross (1987-89); Amalfi (1989-90); Star of Venice (1990-2002)
- Owner: Det Bergenske Dampskibsselskab (1952-77); Stord Vaerft (1977-79); Kuwait Livestock (1979-81); Aspis Maritime (1981); Dolphin Hellas (1981-89); Beacon Seaways (1989-90); Valgas Trading (Vanuatu) (1990-1993); Newport Shipping (1993-95); Star of Venice Navigation (1995 - 2001)
- Operator: Bergenske Dampskibsselskab (1952-79); Kuwait Livestock (1979-81); Dolphin Hellas and on charter (1984-89); American Star (Greece) (1989); StarLauro (1989-90); Star Cruise Line (1990-92); Mediterranean Cruises (1998-2000)
- Port of registry: (Norway) Bergen (1952-79); Kuwait (1979-82); (Greece) Piraeus (1982-90); (Vanuatu) Port Vila (1990-93); Panama City (1993-2001)
- Route: Newcastle upon Tyne - (dock at North Shields) - Bergen - Stavanger (1957-74)
- Builder: Swan Hunter & Wigham Richardson, River Tyne, United Kingdom
- Launched: 3 September 1952
- Completed: April 1953
- In service: 1953
- Out of service: 1974-84; 1989; 1992-98; 2000-02
- Identification: IMO number: 5205253; Code Letters LAMX (1952-79); Code Letters SVIZ (1985-88)
- Fate: Scrapped in 2002

General characteristics
- Type: Ferry (1952-74); Accommodation ship (1977-80); Cruise liner (1984-91); Floating hostel (1992); Cruise liner (1998-99)
- Tonnage: 6,670 GRT (6,471 GRT after 1981); 1,970 DWT
- Length: 133.51 m (438 ft 0 in)
- Beam: 17.43 m (57 ft 2 in)
- Draught: 9.15 m (30 ft 0 in) (Note: Some references, e.g. Cooke, state 20 feet draught.)
- Decks: 11 decks
- Installed power: 13,000 SHP steam turbines.
- Propulsion: Two Parsons geared steam turbines; Two screw propellers
- Speed: 22 knots (41 km/h)

TS Leda was operated by Bergen Line between Britain and Norway as a North Sea ferry for over 20 years from 1953. She was rebuilt in 1981 as a cruise liner and later became an accommodation vessel at a penal colony for terrorists and members of the Mafia. In 2002, whilst being broken up, she was boarded by Greenpeace campaigners protesting about conditions in the shipbreaking industry.

== Bergen Line ferry ==
TS Leda was a passenger and cargo vessel operating between 1953 and 1974 as a twice weekly North Sea ferry between Bergen, Stavanger and Newcastle upon Tyne.

Built by Swan Hunter for Det Bergenske Dampskibsselskab (Bergen Line), she was launched in 1952 by Princess Astrid of Norway accompanied by her father, Crown Prince Olav. Leda replaced the Vega which had been sunk in the war and was important for the Bergen Line in operating the ferry service (the "Norwegian Royal Mail Route") that had started in 1890. The first Norwegian vessel to be built with stabilisers, Leda's powerful steam turbines made her quiet and good at sea. She was of a particularly elegant and, for her day, modern design with a raked stem, single broad funnel and tripod mast. She had accommodation for 119 first class passengers and 384 tourist class. Up to 18 cars, lifted on and off by her own electric cranes, could be accommodated in three cargo holds. She ran two sailings a week in each direction. Throughout most of the 1960s she ran three round trips per week in the summer. The sailing took 17 hours to Stavanger; direct sailings to Bergen took 19 hours.

On her inaugural cruise, with king Haakon VII of Norway on board, she ran aground in Oslofjord but this only delayed her entering service by a few days. On 21 December 1957 when about 120 miles southwest of Stavanger Leda received a message from Stonehaven Radio Station saying that the Scottish freighter SS Narva was in distress. In winds gusting to severe gale Leda turned and went three miles to reach Narva which was rapidly sinking and which reported it had no lifeboats to launch. Narva herself had been going to assist another vessel in distress. Leda launched its lifeboat and the crew could hear Narva's crew but not see any of them. The ship sank at about 04:40 and Leda's lifeboat, despite further searching, found none of the 28 crew. The Leda stayed at the scene until morning. Despite sea and air searches, none of Narva's crew were rescued.

== Later history ==
During her long and varied history Leda went through many changes of name, ownership and use. In the oil crisis of the 1970s her lack of fuel-efficiency and the advent of roll-on/roll-off ferries led to her being laid up in Bergen in 1974, then being chartered as a hostel for oil rig workers until 1979. She was purchased for use as a livestock carrier but instead, as Najla, (Note: Lloyd's Register also listed her as Nalja.) she was again used for accommodation, this time in the Hebrides, Scotland.

In 1980 she was purchased by Dolphin (Hellas) of Piraeus, renamed Albatross, and rebuilt at Perama to become a cruise liner. The aluminium superstructure was extended, the funnel re-shaped and the mainmast removed. By the time the changes were complete in 1984 a swimming pool had been provided and there were 202 cabins accommodating 484 passengers. After some Mediterranean cruises in 1984, and temporarily renamed Alegro, in the same year she undertook cruises in South America. The year 1985 saw Mediterranean, Atlantic and Norwegian cruises under the name Albatross.

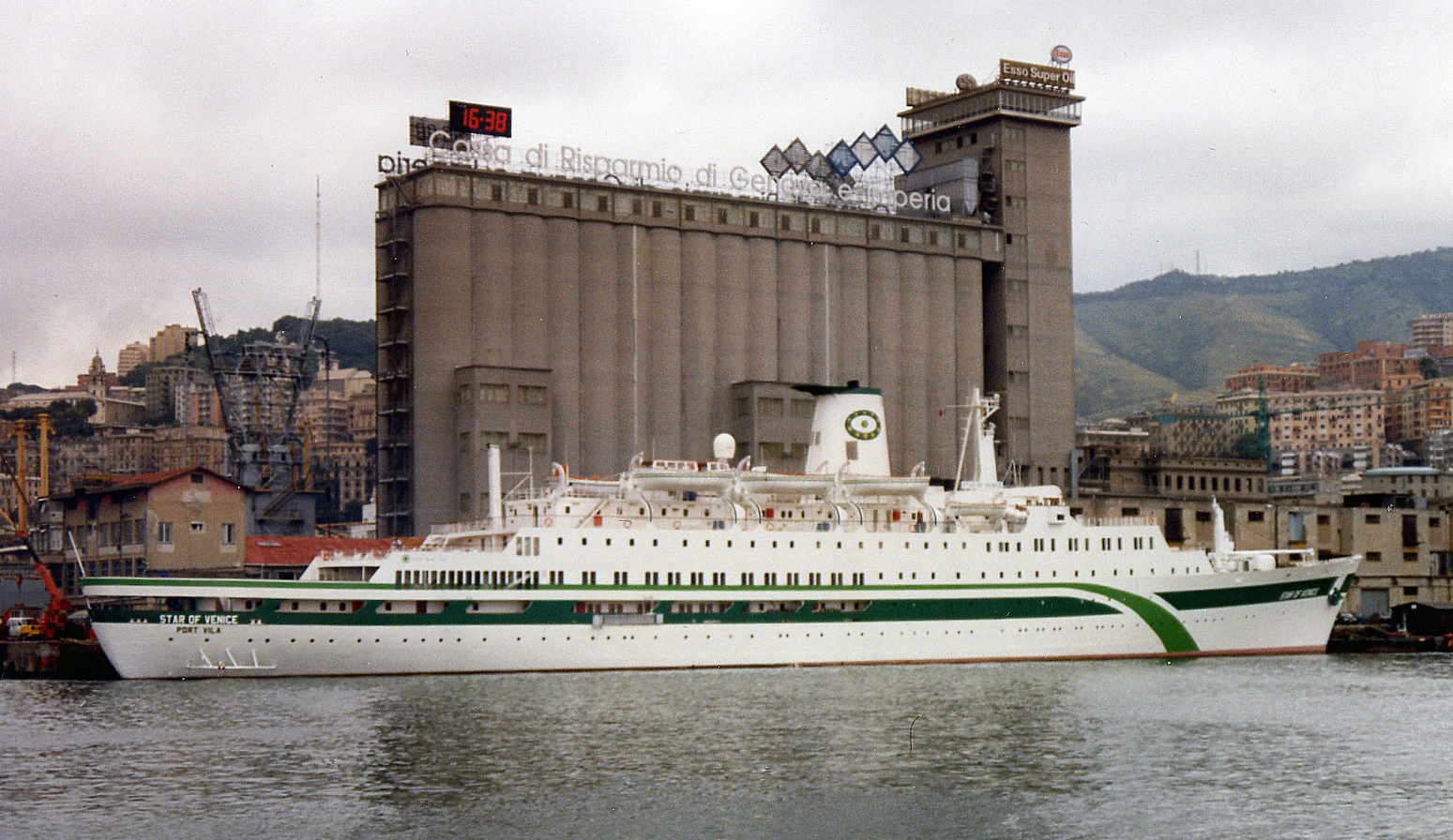
Star of Venice at Genoa, 1992

In 1985 she was chartered to the American Star Line (Greek owned) and renamed Betsy Ross, in honour of Betsy Ross who made the first American Flag, for cruises between Florida and Brazil. However, these were undersubscribed so instead she ran cruises between Venice and Piraeus until being laid-up. By this time her general condition was deteriorating and a charter for African cruises had to be abandoned after a short time. In 1989 she was chartered as Amalfi, only to be laid up for debt at Venice. She was purchased at auction in 1990 by Stargas, renamed Star of Venice, and put under the Vanuatu flag. (Note: Under the ownership of Valgas Trading.) After a fire in 1991 she was repaired in Rijeka only to become a floating police hostel in 1992 both at Genoa (Note: For the Columbus International Exposition celebrating the quincentenary of Columbus’s first voyage to the Americas.) and at Pianosa, Italy, at that time a maximum-security prison island which housed terrorists and members of the Mafia. Once more she was laid up at Venice until being brought into operation for Mediterranean Cruises in 1998, with disastrous results stemming from her poor mechanical condition. In 2000 she was last used as a hotel ship at Ravenna.

== Demise ==
In 2001 Star of Venice was towed to Aliağa, Turkey, to be broken up. Shortly afterwards in 2002, and while she was being scrapped, the Greenpeace vessel Rainbow Warrior arrived as part of a campaign against toxic waste and poor working conditions in the shipbreaking industry. One of the Greenpeace demonstrations took place on the Star of Venice's hulk.
