= SS Narva =

Cargo ship built in 1943

History
- Name: Aletta Noot (1943-45); Empire Conference (1945-46); Narva (1946-57)
- Owner: Franz Haniel & Cie GmbH (1943-45); Ministry of War Transport (1945); Ministry of Transport (1945-46); Scottish Navigation Co Ltd (1946-57)
- Operator: Franz Haniel & Cie GmbH (1943-45); Springwell Shipping Co Ltd (1945-46); Glen & Co (1946-57)
- Port of registry: (Nazi Germany) Duisburg (1943-45); (United Kingdom) London (1945-46); (United Kingdom) Glasgow (1946-57)
- Builder: Gävle Varvs & Verkstads Nya AB
- Launched: 1943
- Out of service: 22 December 1957
- Identification: Code Letters GQFP (1945-57); United Kingdom Official Number 180728 (1945-57)
- Fate: Sank

General characteristics
- Type: Cargo ship
- Tonnage: 2,000 GRT (1943-45); 1,991 GRT (1945-46); 2,044 GRT (1946-57); 1,000 NRT (1943-45); 1,076 NRT (1945-46)
- Length: 255 ft 5 in (77.85 m)
- Beam: 41 ft 1 in (12.52 m)
- Draught: 18 ft 8 in (5.69 m)
- Depth: 18 ft 3 in (5.56 m)
- Installed power: Compound steam engine
- Propulsion: Screw propeller
- Crew: 28 (Narva)

Location of the sinking of Narva.

Narva was a 2,044 GRT cargo ship that was built in 1943 as Aletta Noot by Gävle Varvs & Verkstads Nya AB, Gävle, Sweden for German owners. She was seized by the Allies at Flensburg, Germany in May 1945, passed to the Ministry of War Transport (MoWT) and renamed Empire Confederation. In 1946, she was sold into merchant service and renamed Narva. On 22 December 1957, she foundered whilst going to the aid of another ship in distress.

== Description ==
The ship was built in 1943 by Gävle Varvs & Verkstads Nya AB, Gävle.

The ship was 255 feet 6 inches (77.88 m) long, with a beam of 41 feet 1 inch (12.52 m) a depth of 18 feet 3 inches (5.56 m). Her draught was about 18 feet 8 inches (5.69 m). She had a GRT of 1,991 and a NRT of 1,076.

The ship was propelled by a compound steam engine which had two cylinders of 15 1/2 inches (39 cm) and two cylinders of 35 1/2 inches (90 cm) diameter by 35 1/2 inches (90 cm) stroke. The engine was built by Christensen & Meyer, Hamburg.

== History ==
Aletta Noot was built for Franz Haniel & Cie GmbH. Her port of registry was Duisburg.

In May 1945, Aletta Noot was seized by the Allies at Rendsburg, Germany. She was passed to the MoWT and renamed Empire Confederation. Her port of registry was changed to London The Code Letters GQFP and United Kingdom Official Number 180728 were allocated. She was operated under the management of Springwell Shipping Co Ltd. In 1946, she was sold to the Scottish Navigation Co Ltd, Glasgow and was renamed Narva. She was operated under the management of Glen & Co, Glasgow. Narva was recorded as 2,044 GRT.

On 22 December 1957, Narva was on a voyage from Hudiksvall, Sweden to Grangemouth, Scotland with a cargo of woodpulp. Narva received a distress call from SS Bosworth, which was listing badly. It was whilst she was going to the aid of Bosworth that she foundered 180 nautical miles (330 km) east of Aberdeen (57°28′N 3°00′E) with the loss of all 28 crew. A distress call was issued at 02:30 UTC. The TS Leda went to the aid of Narva, which was down by the bow with her propeller high in the air when Leda arrived at 03:30. The crew were at the stern of the ship but none of them jumped into the sea so that Leda could rescue them. Narva ceased to register on the radar screen of Leda at 05:40. A Royal Norwegian Air Force Catalina from Sola was despatched to search for survivors, but only found deck cargo and an upturned lifeboat. Two RAF Coastal Command Shackletons were also despatched from RAF Kinloss, as were two from RAF Ballykelly. A Royal Danish Air Force Catalina also assisted in the search, which was coordinated from RAF Pitreavie.

On 23 July 1958, a question was asked in Parliament by George Lawson, MP as to whether a date had been set for an inquiry into the loss of Narva. The Rt. Hon. Airey Neave, then Minister of Transport and Civil Aviation replied that the inquiry would open in Glasgow on 12 November 1958. The inquiry lasted two days, it determined that the cause of the loss of Narva was through water entering her forward hold through unknown causes, with no fault being found on the part of the crew.
