= HNoMS Heimdal =

Norwegian steam ship built in 1892

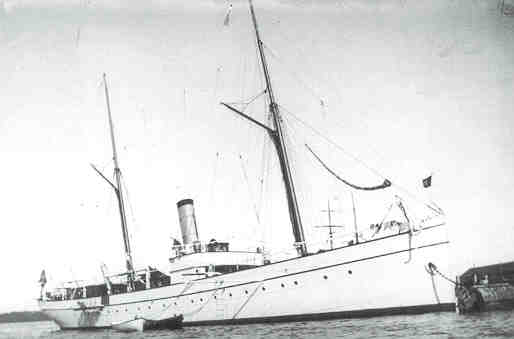
- The royal yacht Heimdal at Horten in July 1914

History

Norway
- Name: Heimdal
- Namesake: Norse god Heimdall
- Builder: Akers Mek. verksted in Kristiania
- Launched: 1892
- Decommissioned: 1946
- Renamed: Rovena (1946)
- Fate: Sank 80 nm east of Langanes, Iceland 18 August 1947

General characteristics
- Displacement: 578 tons
- Length: 55 m (180.45 ft)
- Beam: 8.2 m (26.90 ft)
- Draft: 4.5 m (14.76 ft)
- Propulsion: 650 hp vertical triple expansion steam engine, 1 shaft
- Speed: 12 knots (22.22 km/h)
- Complement: 62 men
- Armament: As built: 4 × 65 mm (2.56 inch) guns; 2 × 37 mm (1.45 inch) guns; After 1921 rearmament: 4 × 76 mm (3 inch) guns; 2 × 37 mm guns
- Notes: All the above listed information, unless otherwise noted, was acquired from

HNoMS Heimdal was a Norwegian warship built at Akers mekaniske verksted in Kristiania, Norway in 1892 with build number 137.

She was built to patrol Norwegian territorial waters and act as a rescue ship for sea travelers. Throughout her life she served in numerous roles; as a royal yacht (1892–1905, 1905–1908), command ship (1905), offshore patrol vessel and rescue ship (1892–1940), headquarters and depot ship (1940–1943), accommodation ship (1945–1946) and civilian cargo ship (1946–1947).

Heimdal spent most of her service life on the coasts of Finnmark and in the Arctic seas, with her first cruise from 30 September 1892 and her first Arctic patrol in April and May 1893.

== Name ==
She was named after Heimdall – the guardian of the Norse gods who will blow the Gjallarhorn if danger approaches Asgard.

== Royal Yacht Heimdal ==
=== For Oscar II ===
In addition to her duties patrolling Norwegian waters Heimdal also served as a royal yacht. Her first voyage in this role took place when she took on board king Oscar II of Sweden and Norway for a cruise along the coast of Norway from 6 July to 4 August in 1896.

=== For Haakon VII ===
Heimdal's perhaps greatest moments of glory came after the dissolution of the union between Norway and Sweden when she was chosen as the Royal Yacht of the recently elected Haakon VII – the first modern king of Norway.

==== Bringing the new royal family to Oslo ====
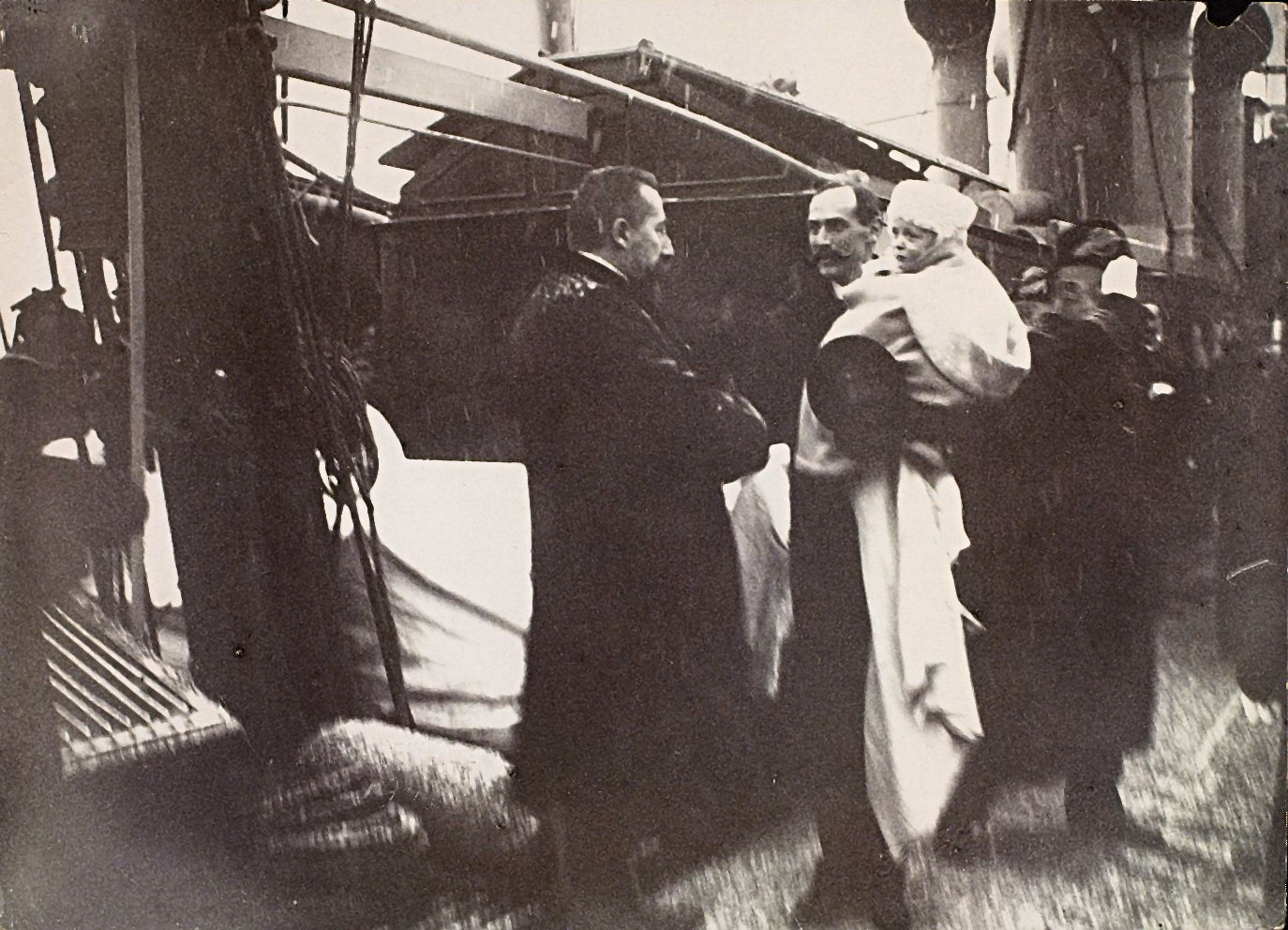
Prime Minister Michelsen greets King Haakon and Prince Olav on board Heimdal

When the new royal family arrived at Drøbak Sound in the Oslofjord 25 November 1905 on their way to their new country they transferred from the Danish royal yacht Dannebrog, which had brought them from Copenhagen, on to Heimdal for the last stretch to Oslo. As the royals came on board Heimdal they were greeted by prime minister Christian Michelsen and his cabinet. It was when Haakon, Maud and Olav stepped off Heimdal at Vippetangen wharf near Akershus Fortress that the Norwegian people got their first chance to see their new royals. After the new royal family had disembarked the prime minister held a short welcome speech.

==== Coronation journey ====
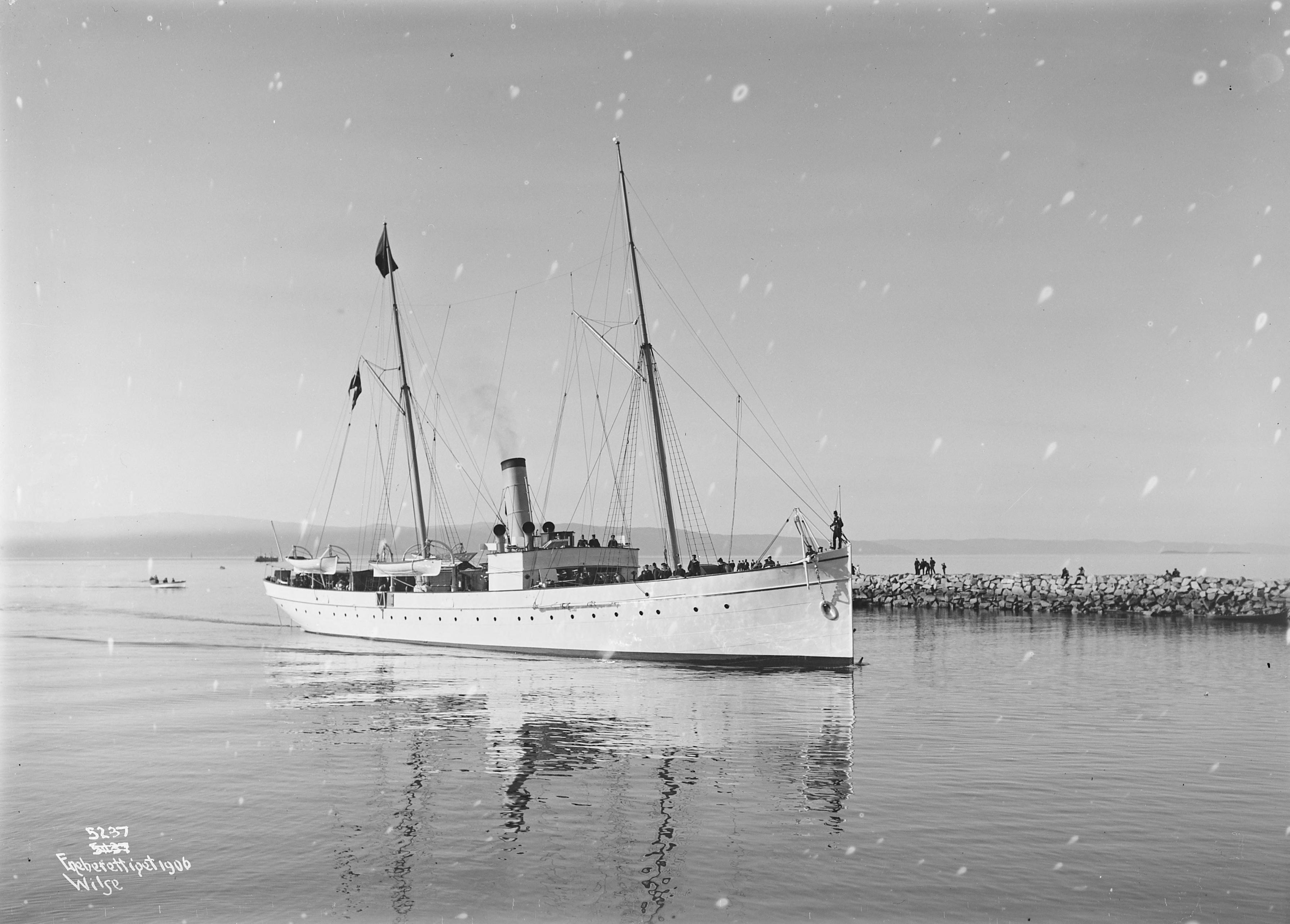
Heimdal bringing Haakon VII and Maud to Trondheim for their coronation

The first substantial journey the royal family took in Norway was their journey to Trondheim for the coronation of the royal couple in Nidaros Cathedral 22 June 1906. They were brought to the city by Heimdal, disembarking at Brattøra.

==== Continued service as the royal yacht ====
Although being transferred back her old naval duties in 1908, Heimdal continued to transport the royals around Norway from time to time. Amongst these trips were to the International Yacht Racing Union's fourth annual Europe week sailing regatta, held in Horten 14 to 21 July 1914, and when the King went to visit Molde shortly after its great fire in 1916.

== Fishery protection ==
When Norway introduced regulated protection of the fisheries within her economic zone Heimdal carried out the first ever sortie of a Norwegian fishery protection vessel on 12 March 1908. She also became the first Norwegian ship to apprehend a ship for illegal fishing when, on 11 March 1911, she stopped and took under arrest the 293-ton British fishing trawler Lord Roberts off the coast of Finnmark. Lord Roberts would go on to serve as naval trawler in the Royal Navy during the First World War. HMT Lord Roberts was mined and sunk off Shipwash, Harwich on 26 October 1916.

== Arctic service ==
=== Annexation of Svalbard ===
On 14 August 1925 Heimdal took part in the formal Norwegian annexation of the Svalbard archipelago in the Arctic. When Minister of Justice Paal Berg read the annexation declaration on the behalf of King Haakon VII near the settlement of Longyearbyen, Heimdal provided an honour guard of sailors and fired a salute with her guns.

=== Supporting polar expeditions ===
In her role as an Arctic patrol vessel, Heimdal supported several aerial expeditions aimed at the North Pole.

==== 1925 Amundsen-Ellsworth flying boat expedition ====
In 1925 Norwegian explorers Roald Amundsen and Hjalmar Riiser-Larsen and American explorer Lincoln Ellsworth mounted an attempt at reaching the Pole with two Dornier Do J flying boats. When the expedition returned to Spitsbergen, having lost one of the two flying boats but succeeded in flying closer to the Pole than had been previously done, Heimdal fired a welcome salute.

==== Amundsen-Ellsworth-Nobile dirigible expedition ====
When the Roald Amundsen, Lincoln Ellsworth and Italian explorer Umberto Nobile in 1926 mounted a successful expedition to overfly the North Pole in the airship Norge, Heimdal served as a transport and support vessel at Kings Bay, Spitsbergen.

== The Second World War ==
Heimdal saw service in the Second World War, first in the Norwegian campaign, then in administrative and depot functions in the United Kingdom.

=== Before the German invasion ===
From October 1939 Heimdal was posted to Tromsø. At Tromsø she served as a guard and support ship for the Heinkel He 115 seaplane bombers based at the Royal Norwegian Navy Air Service station at Skattøra.

=== Norwegian Campaign ===
At the outbreak of war between Norway and Nazi Germany with the German invasion of Norway Heimdal was posted to the 3. naval district's fisheries protection service in Northern Norway and based out of Narvik. Luckily for the ship she was out at sea when the invasion struck and thus avoided the fate that befell many of the other RNoN ship that were caught in port and captured by the invaders.

==== Escort missions and patrols ====
During the two months of fighting Heimdal was based at Karlsøy Municipality, serving as a guard ship and escorting troopships carrying Norwegian soldiers from the Tromsø area down to the Narvik front. On 17 April she escorted first the steamers Prins Olav (2,147 tons) and Ariadne (2,029 tons) and later the same day two Hurtigruten ships, the 1,489-ton Dronning Maud and the 874-ton Kong Haakon. Heimdal repeated this task when she escorted the 921-ton steamship Tordenskjold north from Gisundet to Tromsø on 3 May. In this she helped bring forward the troops that were to give the Germans their first serious, if temporary, land defeat of the war.

While patrolling the sound of Grøtsundet on 29 May Heimdal was attacked by a single Luftwaffe bomber. All the bombs missed the ship and failed to explode.

==== Carrying the King once again ====
After evacuating their headquarters in Molde on 30 April the king and his entourage was moved north on the Royal Navy cruiser HMS Glasgow to Rystraumen in Troms county where he boarded his old ship Heimdal once again. Heimdal brought the King and his people to Tromsø, from where they moved to Balsfjord Municipality where they remained until leaving for the United Kingdom on 7 June.

=== Heimdal in the United Kingdom ===
On 7 June 1940 all serviceable ships and aircraft of the Royal Norwegian Navy received orders to evacuate to the United Kingdom as soon as possible. Heimdal was one of the thirteen Royal Norwegian Navy vessels that made it to the United Kingdom and could continue the struggle against Nazi Germany. At 0355 hrs on 8 June Heimdal, accompanied by the 406-ton minesweeper HNoMS Thorodd, left Norwegian waters and started her voyage into exile. Being a quite slow ship Heimdal arrived at Lerwick, Shetland 14 June 1940 and spent two days in port there before arriving in Rosyth at 1830 hrs on 17 June. She transferred to the Norwegian Rosyth naval section as a command and depot ship on 30 June.

==== Service in the United Kingdom ====
Being a very old ship the undermanned Royal Norwegian Navy in exile did not use Heimdal for any operational duties and put her to use as a headquarters ships, and as a depot ship for Rosyth Command. She served alongside the fellow Norwegian ship Ranen at Port Edgar in the latter function, until being deactivated and laid up at Burntisland, Scotland on 29 October 1943.

=== C.O.s from 8.4.1940 ===
- Captain S. Johnsen: 8 April 1940 – 20 December 1940
- Lieutenant Ragnar F. Christiansen: 20 December 1940 – 6 March 1941
- Lieutenant Thomas Jacobsen: 20 April 1941 – 29 April 1941
- Lieutenant Commander Aimar Sørensen: 5 January 1943 – 1 February 1943
- Lieutenant Commander Trygve Lind: 28 February 1943 – 17 December 1944
- Lieutenant Commander Harald Voltersvik: 18 December 1944 – 12 May 1945
- Lieutenant Mikal Hellesund: 12 May 1945 – 31 July 1945
- Lieutenant Commander Bjarne Sjong: 31 July 1945 – 1 January 1946

== Peace and shipwreck ==
After VE day Heimdal was reactivated and sailed back home to Norway in May 1945. There she was used as an accommodation ship until sold off to civilian interests in 1946, renamed Rovena and converted to a cargo vessel. It was in this guise that she sank off Iceland 18 August 1947, while carrying a cargo of 2,800 barrels of herring.

== Literature ==
- Abelsen, Frank (1986). Norwegian naval ships 1939–1945 (in Norwegian and English). Oslo: Sem & Stenersen AS. ISBN 82-7046-050-8.
- Hermansen, Max, ed. (2008). Hardt Styrbord: Glimt fra norsk sjøkrigshistorie (in Norwegian). Oslo: Sjømilitære Samfunds forlag. ISBN 978-82-997703-0-9.
- Sivertsen, Svein Carl, ed. (2000). Med Kongen til fornyet kamp - Oppbyggingen av Marinen ute under Den andre verdenskrig (in Norwegian). Hundvåg: Sjømilitære Samfund ved Norsk Tidsskrift for Sjøvesen. ISBN 82-994738-8-8.
- Sivertsen, Svein Carl, ed. (2001). Sjøforsvaret dag for dag 1814-2000 (in Norwegian). Hundvåg: Sjømilitære Samfund ved Norsk Tidsskrift for Sjøvesen. ISBN 82-92217-03-7.
