= Rudder angle indicator =

Device that shows a ship rudder's current position

A rudder angle indicator is a device used to indicate the present position of the rudder blade, usually fitted near the Ship's wheel on the bridge and in the engine control room.

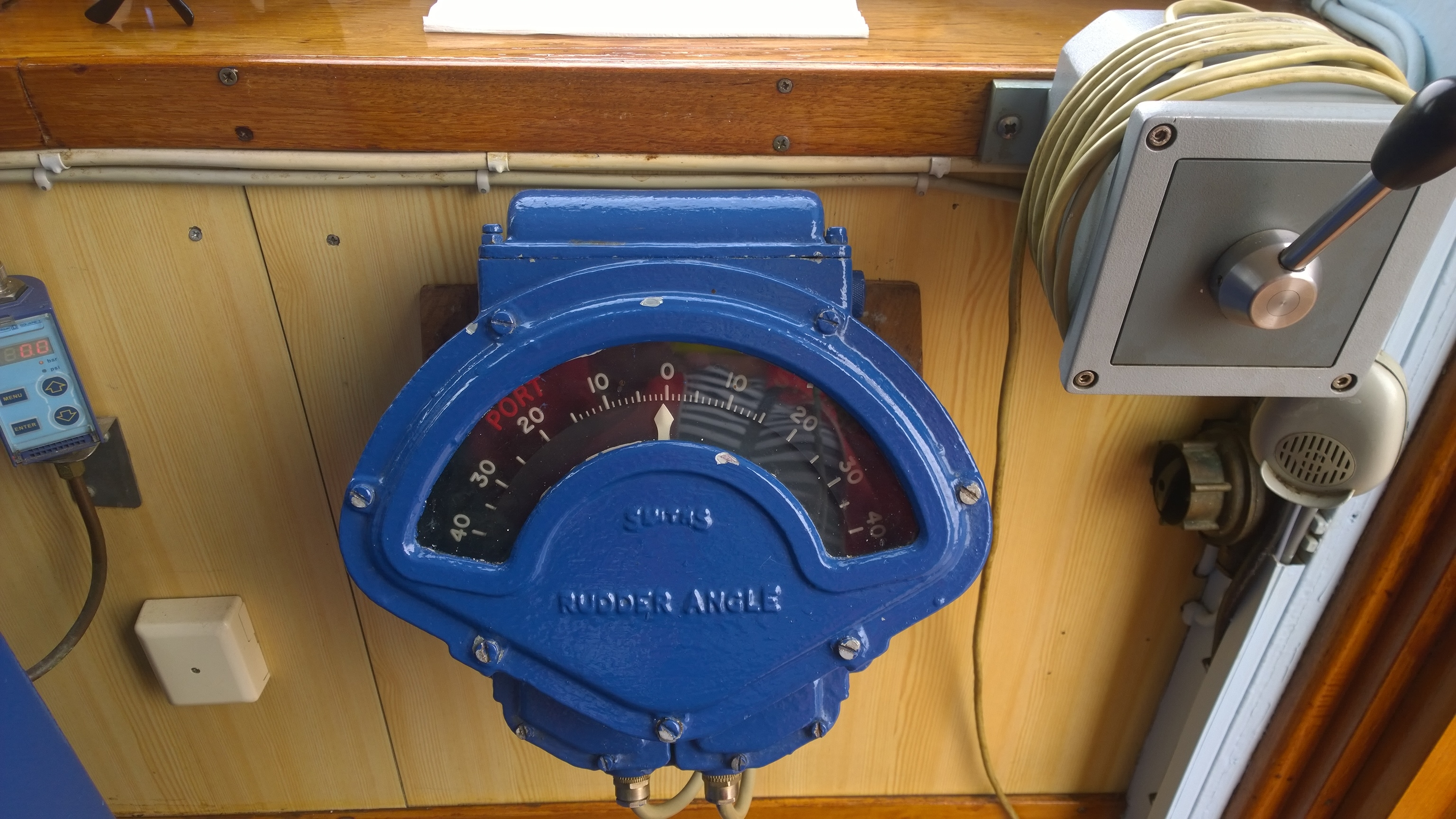
Rudder angle indicator of the MS Nordstjernen (1956)

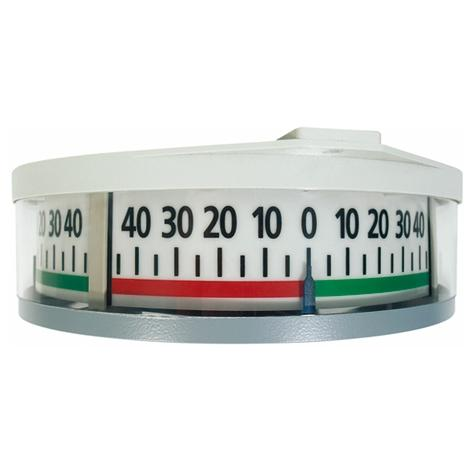
Rudder angle indicator

== See also ==
- Ship's wheel
