= MS Nordstjernen =

Norwegian coastal passenger ship

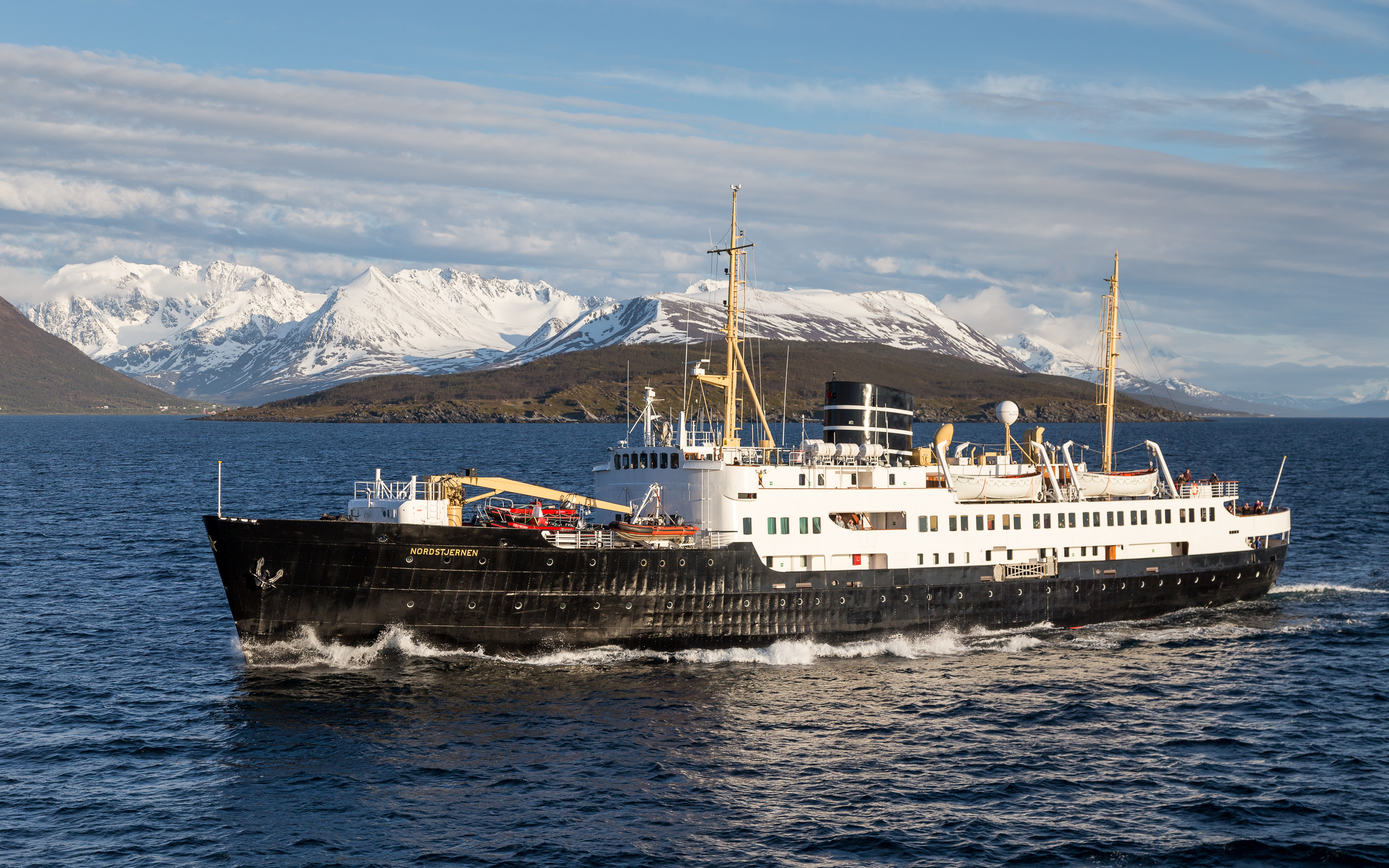
- MS Nordstjernen in 2015

History
- Name: MS Nordstjernen
- Owner: 1956–1979: Det Bergenske Dampskibsselskap; 1979-2006 Troms Fylkes Dampskibsselskap; 2006–2012: Hurtigruten; 2012–2013: Vestland Rederi; 2013–: Nordstjernen
- Operator: Vestland Marine
- Route: Norway and Spitsbergen
- Builder: Blohm+Voss, Germany
- Yard number: 787
- Launched: 26 October 1955
- Completed: 24 February 1956
- Identification: Call sign: LATU3; IMO number: 5255777; MMSI number: 257276000
- Status: In service

General characteristics
- Class & type: Passenger liner
- Tonnage: 2,191 GT
- Length: 88.78 m (291 ft 3 in)
- Beam: 12.64 m (41 ft 6 in)
- Decks: 4 passenger
- Propulsion: diesel engines, two propellers
- Speed: 15 knots (27.78 km/h; 17.26 mph)
- Capacity: 150 passengers (originally 400) 149 berths

Nordstjernen (Norwegian: "The North Star") is a vessel built by Blohm+Voss, Germany in 1956, and used on the Hurtigruten coastal service until 2012. It was the oldest operational ship in the Hurtigruten fleet at the time of its withdrawal, and is the ship with the longest history of Hurtigruten service. In 2012, she was protected as a national heritage in Norway.

== History ==
Nordstjernen was mainly used for the Hurtigruten coastal service and for cruises to the Svalbard archipelago. She was extensively refitted in 1982/83.

From 2010 to 2012 she operated continuously on the Hurtigruten coastal service. In March 2012, she was withdrawn from the coastal service, and was replaced by Finnmarken, which came back in Hurtigruten service after it was in Australia. Hurtigruten was using her for Svalbard cruises in the summer of 2012.

In November 2012, the ship was bought by Vestland Rederi. In connection with the sale, she was protected as a national heritage by the Norwegian Directorate for Cultural Heritage (Riksantikvaren). Nordstjernen's new home port is Bergen, as it was with her original owner Bergen Steamship Company (Det Bergenske Dampskibsselskab, BDS). From the end of 2012 to July 2013, she underwent an extensive restoration in Gdańsk, Poland, which was subsidized with 2.5 million NOK by Riksantikvaren. After coming back to Norway and taking part in the Fjordsteam festival in Bergen in the first days of August 2013, the new owner intends to market her as a hotel ship and for charter cruises.

Finally she left Gdańsk on 9 November 2013. On her way back to Norway, she ran aground in the Karmsund strait on 11 November 2013. There was damage to the ship which was repaired at a dockyard in Ølensvåg, and at the end of January 2014, Nordstjernen left the dockyard. Since 2015, Hurtigruten has chartered the ship they formerly owned each summer and operated it again for Svalbard cruises. From 2025, this is no longer possible as the open lifeboats are no longer permitted in the Norwegian Arctic and a replacement of these lifeboats is not allowed due to the ship's protected heritage status. Hurtigruten Svalbard will use Serenissima, the former Harald Jarl, now also owned by the Vestland company, for these cruises.
