= SS Haga (1938) =

German-built cargo ship

History
- Name: Haga (1938–45); Empire Consumer (1945–46); Hauknes (1946–47); Orm Jarl (1947–58); Travnik (1958–65); Komovi (1965–67); Moschoula (1967–68)
- Owner: Mathies Reederei (1938–45); Ministry of War Transport (1945); Ministry of Transport (1945–46); Norwegian Government (1946–47); Nordenfjeldske Dampskibsselskab (1947–58); Atlantska Plovidba (1958–63); Mediteranske Plovidbe (1963–65); Prekooceanskoj Plovidbi (1965–67); N D Boukouvalas (1967–68)
- Operator: Mathies Reederei (1938–45); Aln Steamship Co Ltd (1945–46); Norwegian Government (1946–47); Nordenfjeldske Dampskibsselskab (1947–58); Atlantska Plovidba (1958–63); Mediteranske Plovidbe (1963–65); Prekooceanskoj Plovidbi (1965–67); N D Boukouvalas (1967–68)
- Port of registry: (Nazi Germany) Hamburg (1938–45); (United Kingdom) London (1945–46); (Norway) Trondheim (1946–58); (Socialist Federal Republic of Yugoslavia) Dubrovnik (1958–63); (Socialist Federal Republic of Yugoslavia) Korčula (1963–65); (Socialist Federal Republic of Yugoslavia) Bar (1965–68); Greece (1967–68)
- Route: Hamburg - Stockholm (1938–45)
- Builder: Flensburger Schiffbau-Gesellschaft,
- Launched: 1938
- Identification: Code Letters DJYW (1938–45); Code Letters GLKK (1945–46); United Kingdom Official Number 180696 (1945–46)
- Fate: Scrapped

General characteristics
- Type: Cargo ship
- Tonnage: 1,258 GRT; 698 NRT; 1,725 DWT
- Length: 270 ft 4 in (82.40 m)
- Beam: 37 ft 7 in (11.46 m)
- Draught: 15 feet 3 1/2 inches (4.661 m)
- Depth: 12 ft 7 in (3.84 m)
- Installed power: Compound steam engine
- Propulsion: Screw propeller
- Speed: 9 knots (17 km/h)

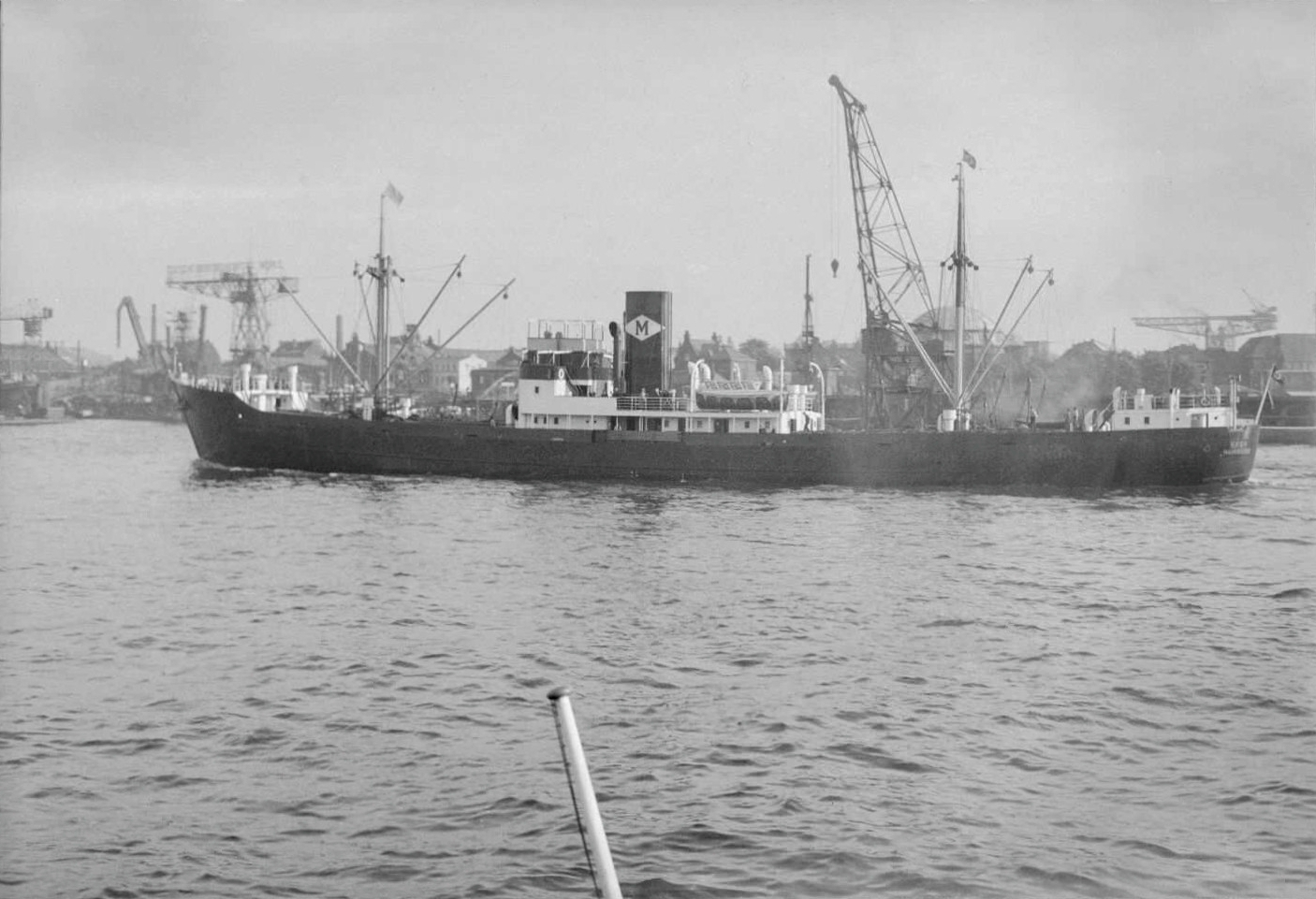
The German steamship "Haga"

Haga was a 1,258 GRT cargo ship that was built in 1938 by Flensburger Schiffbau-Gesellschaft, Flensburg, Germany for German owners. She was seized by the Allies in May 1945, passed to the Ministry of War Transport (MoWT) and was renamed Empire Consumer. In 1946, she was transferred to the Norwegian Government and renamed Hauknes. She was sold into merchant service in 1947 and renamed Orm Jarl. In 1958, she was sold to Yugoslavia and renamed Travnik. A further sale in 1965 saw her renamed Komovi. In 1967, she was sold to Greece and renamed Moschoula. She served until 1968 when she was scrapped.

== Description ==
The ship was built in 1938 by Flensburger Schiffbau-Gesellschaft, Flensburg.

The ship was 270 feet 4 inches (82.40 m) long, with a beam of 36 feet 2 inches (11.02 m) and a depth of 12 feet 7 inches (3.84 m). Her draught was 15 feet 3 1/2 inches (4.661 m) The ship had a GRT of 1,258 and a NRT of 698. She had a DWT of 1,725.

The ship was propelled by a compound steam engine which had two cylinders of 14 9/16 inches (37.0 cm) and two cylinders of 31 1/2 inches (80 cm) diameter by 31 1/2 inches (80 cm) stroke. The engine was built by Flensburger Schiffsbau-Gesellschaft. It could propel the ship at 9 knots (17 km/h).

== History ==
Haga was built for Mathies Reederei, Hamburg. Her port of registry was Hamburg and she was allocated the Code Letters DJYW. She was used on the Hamburg - Stockholm route. In May 1945, Haga was seized by the Allies at Kiel. She was passed to the MoWT and renamed Empire Consumer. Her port of registry was changed to London. The Code Letters GLKK and United Kingdom Official Number 180696 were allocated. She was placed under the management of the Aln Steamship Co Ltd.

In July 1946, Empire Consumer was transferred to the Norwegian Government and was renamed Hauknes. In February 1947, she was sold to Nordenfjeldske Dampskibsselskab A/S, Trondheim and was renamed Orm Jarl, the third Nordenfjeldske ship to bear that name. She was used on routes between Norway and the Mediterranean and later between Norway and Hamburg. In 1958, Orm Jarl was sold to Atlantska Plovidba, Dubrovnik and was renamed Travnik. In 1963, she was sold to Mediteranske Plovidbe, Korčula. Travnik was sold in 1965 to Prekooceanskoj Plovidbi, Bar, and was renamed Komovi. In 1967, Komovi was sold to Greek owner N D Boukouvalas and was renamed Moschoula. She served until 1968 when she was scrapped in Split, Yugoslavia.
