= Bergen Steamship Company =

Norwegian shipping company

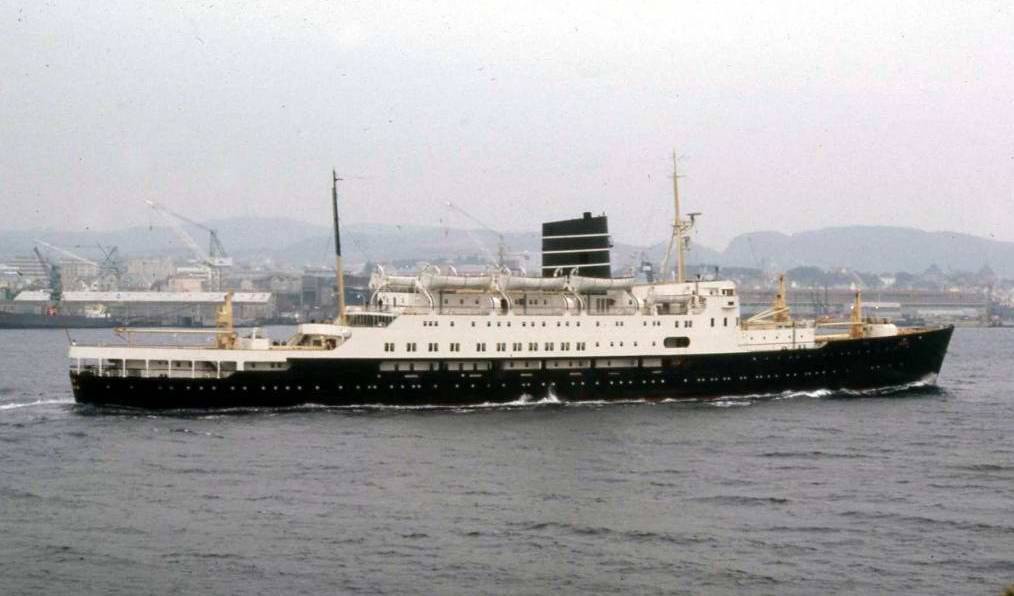
TS Leda, a BDS Newcastle to Bergen ferry in October 1973

The Bergen Steamship Company (Norwegian: Bergenske Dampskibsselskab) (BDS), was founded in 1851 by Michael Krohn to operate a shipping service between the Norwegian ports of Bergen, Stavanger, and Kristiansand and the German port of Hamburg with the paddle steamer Bergen. The company funnel was black with three widely spaced narrow white bands.

BDS progressively expanded its routes to provide worldwide services. The company operated a regular passenger service from West Norway to the UK with Norwegian Government support from 1890, and took part in the Norwegian coastal service, the Hurtigruten, from 1894 until 1979. Cruise liners were run from 1921 until 1971 when BDS partnered Nordenfjeldske Dampskibsselskab in setting up the Royal Viking Line. At its height, between about 1920 and 1970, the company had up to 2500 employees.

During World War II several BDS ships were sunk by Allied action on the Norwegian coast, including MS Rigel in which over 2500 people died. According to the newspaper Bergens Tidende the Company profited highly from shipping contracts entered into with the German occupiers of Norway. At the end of the war the Company's records were no longer in existence. The Company's management was investigated by Bergen police for 18 months, but no charges were brought.

Under the name Bergen Line (not to be confused with the Bergen Line railway) passenger ships were operated between Newcastle, Stavanger, Haugesund and Bergen. These continued after 1984 when the company was taken over by Kosmos Line. After being sold again in 1988, the company lost any individual identity.

== Fleet ==
From a slow start the Company increased its ship numbers from 5 in 1875 to 20 in 1894 and over 45 by 1916 when unrestricted submarine warfare was introduced. The numbers were then increased from 35 in 1918 to 55 by 1939, reduced to 35 by 1945, with a modest increase thereafter.

== UK Passenger Service ==
The UK passenger service ran between Newcastle and Bergen, with some sailings also calling at Stavanger and Haugesund. From 1928 the service terminated at the purpose-built Tyne Commission Quay, North Shields, only two miles from the Tyne piers and now part of the Royal Quays complex. The service continued after 1984 when the company was taken over by Kosmos Line. After being sold again in 1988, the company lost any individual identity.

On 14 June 1888 the Norwegian Parliament agreed to support a weekly mail service from Newcastle to Bergen and Trondheim. Initially the service was provided jointly by the Bergen Line and Nordenfjeldske. The Bergen Line vessel, Mercur (995 GRT), inaugurated the service, departing from Bergen on 31 May 1890 at 9 p.m., arriving in the Tyne early on 2 June. In June 1893 the Bergen Line ship Venus (1,095 GRT), built on the Tyne by Swan Hunter, entered the service and remained on regular sailings until 1931.

In 1912 the Norwegian Government entered a contract with the two companies to increase the frequency of sailings to seven per week. According to Kielhau this was achieved by August 1914 at the start of World War I when the Bergen Line's contribution was provided by Venus, Vega (1,164 GRT) and Irma (1,322 GRT). From August 22 of that year all British mail for the Far East was sent via Newcastle and Bergen and the route became the only safe one for the exchange of personnel between the Western Powers and their Russian ally. In 1915 the service was joined by Jupiter (2,625 GRT), built at Gothenburg and twice the size of previous ships on the route.

Sailings were interrupted at the end of 1916 after four BDS ships including Vega had been intercepted and sunk by U-boats in two months; but Jupiter was chartered by the British Government at £30,000 per year, with the replacement cost set at £200,000, to continue a service between Aberdeen and Bergen with a British crew and under the British flag, with priority guaranteed in a British shipyard for building a replacement should Jupiter meet with an accident. Normal regular services were restarted by Irma on 26 November 1918, followed by Jupiter on 18 January 1919. Nordenfjeldske withdrew in October 1921 but sailings continued with Jupiter and Venus, joined by Leda (2,519 GRT), a sister to Jupiter powered by steam turbines, newly built on the Tyne in 1920 by Armstrong Whitworth.

In 1931, in response to a new route opened by Swedish Lloyd between Gothenburg and Tilbury, Bergen Line ordered a new Venus, a 20-knot motorship of 5,406 GRT, thus once again doubling the size of ship on the route. She maintained the service with Jupiter during most of the 1930s. In 1936 the peak season was covered by Jupiter and Venus, each with two round trips weekly.

The next ship to be built for the service was Vega of 7,287 GRT, built by Cantieri Riuniti dell'Adriatico of Trieste in 1938 to offset Italian purchases of fish from Norway. The two large twin-funnelled motorships maintained a summer service of four round trips per week until the outbreak of World War II, with departures from Bergen at 11.00 on Mondays, Wednesdays, Thursdays and Saturdays, and from Newcastle at 19.30 on Mondays, Tuesdays, Thursdays and Saturdays. Southbound trips from Bergen by Venus on Wednesdays and Saturdays, and northbound trips from the Tyne by Vega on Tuesdays and Saturdays also called at Stavanger and Haugesund.

By 1945 both Venus and Vega had been sunk while in German hands, and the service was re-opened with Lyra (1,525 GRT), a regular passenger service restarting in January 1946 on which she was joined by Astrea (3,190 GRT). Jupiter took over from Lyra in March 1946. Vega's main engines were salvaged in 1949 and installed in two ships, one of which continued in service until 1969. Venus had been discovered sunk in Hamburg harbour in 1945 and judged capable of rebuilding, and she reappeared on the service in April 1948 with a larger profile which had the forecastle built one deck higher (6,269 GRT). She maintained summer sailings from Newcastle and operated cruises from Plymouth to Madeira in the winters from December 1948 onwards, which also took advantage of the cargo opportunity provided by the import of fruit and vegetables to the UK.

The last conventional passenger ferry was TS Leda (6,670 GRT), delivered in 1953 by Swan Hunter and powered by steam turbines giving a speed of 22 knots, making her the only ship which could complete three round voyages weekly, and she did so during the 1950s and 1960s. From 1953 the service continued regularly for 15 years with Leda and Venus operating the summer service with up to five sailings per week, and Leda operating a twice-weekly winter service. Both ships were limited by their lack of drive-on car transport facilities, and Venus was withdrawn and broken up in 1968. Leda continued until its withdrawal in 1974 after steep rises in fuel prices.

Some timetables from the 1930s and 1950s are available on the web. Individual ship histories are also available.

== Hurtigruten ==
The Hurtigruten opened in 1893 to convey passengers and cargo along the Norwegian coast, initially from Trondheim to Hammerfest, later from Bergen to Kirkenes. At the start there were almost no lighthouses and other navigational aids in the north, and navigation was often done with a compass, chart and stopwatch. Until 1937 the company's ships were around 1,000 GRT but then, with Nordstjernen, the size was doubled. New ships built in the 1950s were also of about 2,000 GRT, and these continued on the coastal route until the 1980s when larger passenger-cargo ships came into use, and into the 1990s when larger cruise-type ships of up to 15,000 GRT were introduced. By this time Bergenske Dampskibsselskab had sold its ships and withdrawn from the Hurtigruten. The Company contributed the following ships to the service from 1894 onwards:

- SS Sirius, 1894-1927 (962 GRT)
- SS Jupiter, 1896-1910, (652 GRT)
- SS Orion, 1898-1903, (681 GRT); Wrecked and burnt
- SS Capella, 1898–1912, (877 GRT)
- SS Astræa, 1900-1910, (765 GRT); Wrecked
- SS Lyra, 1905-1912, (784 GRT)
- SS Midnatsol, 1910-1949, (978 GRT)
- SS Hera, 1910-1931 (1,097 GRT); Wrecked
- SS Polarlys, 1912-1951 (1,070 GRT)
- SS Neptun, 1919-1921, (959 GRT)
- MS Stella Polaris, 1927-2006, (5,020 GRT); Cruise Ship 1927 - 1969, Hotel Ship in Kisho Nishiura, Japan from 1969 - 2005, Sank while under tow to Europe in 2006
- SS Mira, 1928-1941, (998 GRT); War loss
- SS Nordstjernen, 1937-1954 (1,919 GRT); Sunk in Raftsundet
- SS Ariadne, 1939-1940 (2,029 GRT) War loss
- MS Midnatsol, 1949-1982 (2,098 GRT)
- MS Nordlys, 1951-1983 (2,162 GRT)
- MS Polarlys, 1952–1993 (2,163 GRT)
- SS Jupiter, 1953-1955 (2,652 GRT)
- MS Nordstjernen, 1956–present (2,194 GRT); withdrawn March 2012.

Photographs of most of these ships and others on the Hurtigruten can be found on the web.

== Russo-Norwegian Navigation Company ==
In 1923, the Russo-Norwegian Navigation Company, Limited was organized in London with the Bergenske Steamship Company, Soviet Company Severoles, and the Russian agency Arcos as principal participants. Alexey Krylov was a member of the board, "mainly to participate in the inspection and testing of the acquired steamers and to monitor the building of the ordered ones." He described the operations of the joint company in his memoir.

The primary function of the company was to transport Russian timber from Arkhangelsk.

The company was dissolved in 1928.
