= Det Nordenfjeldske Dampskibsselskab =

Norwegian shipping company

Det Nordenfjeldske Dampskibsselskab, known as NFDS or Nordenfjeldske for short, was a shipping company in Trondheim, Norway.

The company was established in 1857 as the first shipping company in Trondhjem, as the city was then called. The purpose was to conduct passenger and freight traffic with mail and goods to Hamburg. The company cooperated with Bergenske Dampskibsselskab (BDS), first with traffic as far north as Hammerfest, then with the "England Route", Trondhjem–Bergen–Newcastle.

From 1894 the company was a partner in Hurtigruta. From 1913 to 1924 the company was a partner of Den Norske Syd-Amerika Linje.

In 1925, Nordenfjeldske entered the cruise ship traffic with SS Prins Olav. After a hiatus in cruise traffic from 1936, Nordenfjeldske re-entered the business in 1970 as a partner in Royal Viking Line. It exited the cruise business in 1984.

During the post-war period Nordenfjeldske invested in tank, bulk, chemical shipping and offshore. The company again cooperated closely with BDS, establishing Nor-Cargo together in 1979.

Nordenfjeldske was bought by Norcem in 1984 and the shipping division renamed Nordenfjeldske Shipping, which was bought by Kosmos in 1985 while Norcem retained Nordenfjeldske Offshore. Nordenfjeldske's last Hurtigruta ships were sold to Troms Fylkes Dampskibsselskab i 1989, but Det Nordenfjeldske Dampskibsselskab invested in another ship in 1991. The company was bought by Taubåtkompaniet.
