= Hurtigruten (company) =

Norwegian ferry service and cruise line

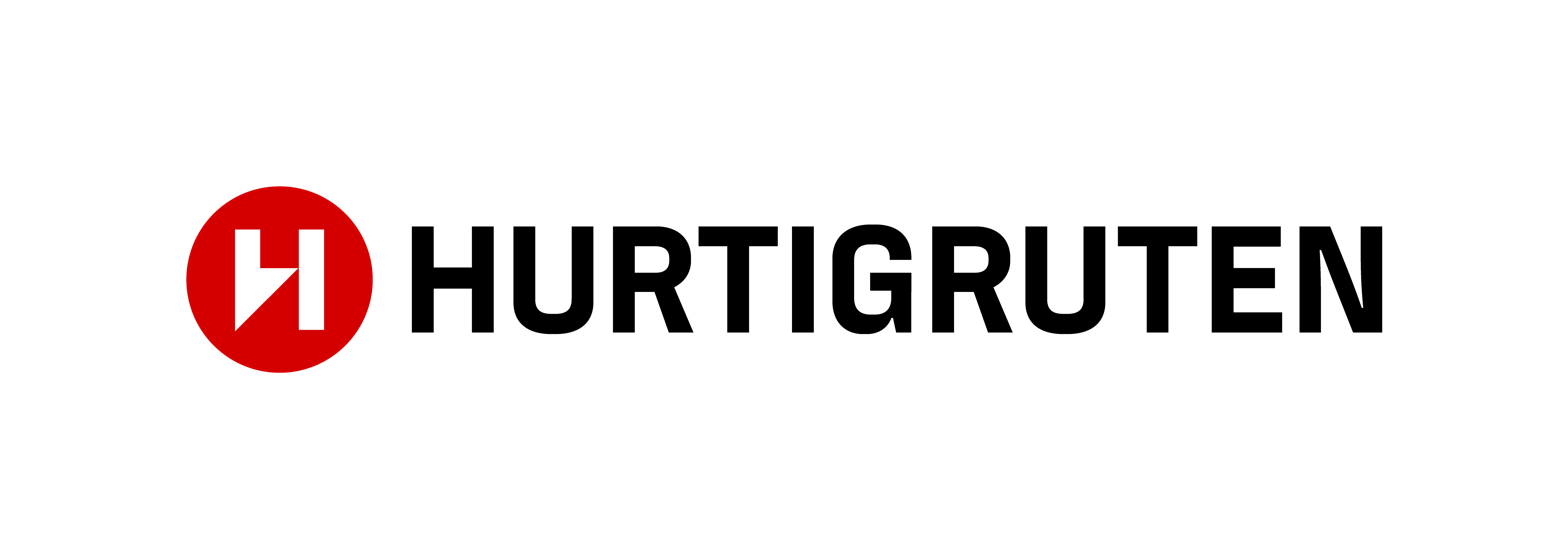
- Type: AS (limited company)
- Industry: Transport
- Founded: 1866 as Troms Fylkes Dampskibsselskap; 1881 as Vesteraalens Dampskibsselskab; 1912 as Ofotens Dampskibsselskab
- Founder: Richard With (VDS)
- Headquarters: Oslo, Norway
- Area served: Norway; Svalbard
- Key people: Hedda Felin (CEO)
- Products: Cruise line Ferry transport Freight shipping
- Revenue: 655.6 euro (2023)
- Subsidiaries: Hurtigruten Svalbard
- Website: Hurtigruten (in English)

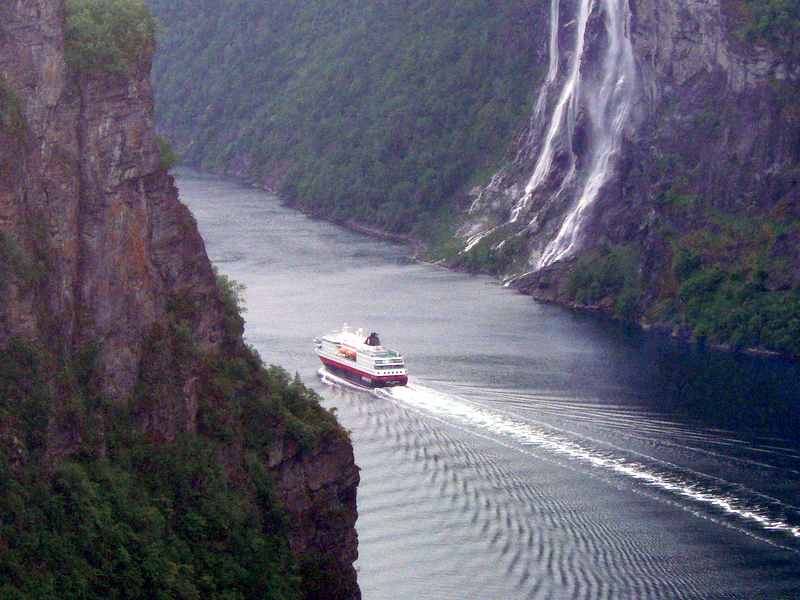
MS Kong Harald (coastal express) in Geirangerfjord.

Hurtigruten AS is a Norwegian coastal ferry and cruise line operator headquartered in Oslo, Norway. It is the larger of two companies currently operating Hurtigruten, the coastal ferry service along the Norwegian coast from which it takes its name.

The CEO is Hedda Felin.

== History ==
Hurtigruten is the result of a merger between the previous operators of the Hurtigruten service, Troms Fylkes Dampskibsselskap (TFDS) and Ofotens og Vesteraalens Dampskibsselskab (OVDS). TFDS was founded in 1866, and OVDS was established in 1912 (ODS) and 1881 (VDS). The two companies merged in March 2006 to form Hurtigruten Group ASA, and twelve months later the merged entity assumed the name Hurtigruten ASA.

Vesteraalens Dampskibsselskab and the company founder, Richard With, pioneered the Norwegian Coastal Express in 1893, and Hurtigruten has continuously served the route since then.

In October 2014, TDR Capital purchased a majority ownership of Hurtigruten. In 2015, the legal form of Hurtigruten was changed from ASA to AS. In 2025, with the divestment from HX Expeditions, Hurtigruten’s headquarters remained in Oslo.

In 2021, the international and the Norwegian branches of the company were separated operationally.

== Operations ==
=== Coastal Express ===
Hurtigruten is one of two operators of the Hurtigruten (literally "the fast route"), a daily passenger ferry, cruise, and shipping line along the western and northern Norwegian coast. It operates between the southern city of Bergen and the northeastern city of Kirkenes. A total of seven ships operate this route.

=== Signature Voyages ===
Hurtigruten also sails five Signature routes along the Norwegian coast: the North Cape Line, the Svalbard Line, the Arctic Line, the Inner Fjords Explorer and the Arctic Circle Explorer.

As of 2026, the Signature routes are operated by three ships. MS Trollfjord sails the North Cape and Svalbard Lines, along with the Arctic Line, Inner Fjords Explorer and Arctic Circle Explorer voyages. MS Midnatsol joined the Signature fleet in 2026 and sails the Svalbard Line in summer. MS Finnmarken sails the North Cape Line from Hamburg year-round, with Midnatsol also operating some Hamburg departures in winter.

=== Tourism ===
The company also owns Hurtigruten Svalbard (formerly Spitsbergen Travel), a tour and hotel company based in Longyearbyen.

=== The Hurtigruten Museum ===
The Hurtigruten Museum is a maritime museum located in the port city of Stokmarknes, Norway that showcases the history of Hurtigruten. The MS Finnmarken, retired from the coastal express and a museum ship now, is located within the Hurtigruten Museum.

== Current fleet ==
As of 2026, Hurtigruten AS operates ten ships in its fleet. This includes MS Finnmarken (formerly MS Otto Sverdrup until 2025) and MS Midnatsol (formerly MS Maud from 2021 to 2024).

Ship	Built	Last refurbished	Dimensions			Capacity		Sailing Route	Hybrid?	Ship image	Ref
Ship	Built	Last refurbished	Length (m)	Beam (m)	Gross tonnage	Passengers	Cars	Sailing Route	Hybrid?	Ship image	Ref
MS Vesterålen	1983	2025/2026	108.55	16.5	6,261	490	24	Original	No		
MS Kong Harald	1993	2023	121.8	19.2	11,204	590	5	Original	Yes		
MS Richard With	1993	2018	121.8	19.2	11,205	590	12	Original	Yes		
MS Nordlys	1994	2019	121.8	19.2	11,204	590	24	Original	Yes		
MS Polarlys	1996	2023	123	19.5	11,341	650	26	Original	No		
MS Nordkapp	1996	2024	123.3	19.5	11,386	590	24	Original	No		
MS Nordnorge	1997	2022	123.3	19.5	11,384	590	32	Original	No		
MS Finnmarken	2002	2020	138.5	21.5	15,690	530	-	Signature	Yes		
MS Trollfjord	2002	2023	135.75	21.5	16,140	500	-	Signature	No		
MS Midnatsol	2003	2021	135.75	21.5	16,151	818	17	Signature	No		

== Former assets ==
=== HX Hurtigruten Expeditions ===
In 2021, Hurtigruten formed a separate business for its expedition cruise business, Hurtigruten Expeditions. In 2024/2025, the company was sold. As HX Hurtigruten Expeditions, the now separate company operates the ships Spitsbergen, Fridtjof Nansen, Roald Amundsen and Fram formerly owned by Hurtigruten AS, as well as the Santa Cruz II in partnership with the Galapagos company Metropolitan Touring. The sale was completed on 12 February 2025, separating Hurtigruten from HX; following the separation, Hurtigruten's business was concentrated on operating the Norwegian coastal express route and providing cruises along the Norwegian coast.

=== Buses ===
Hurtigruten ASA owned 71.3% of the transportation company TIRB. The shares were sold to Boreal Transport Nord AS in July 2014 for 95.9 million NOK.

=== Car ferries ===
Hurtigruten AS operated a number of roll-on/roll-off car ferries in Nordland, Troms, Finnmark and Møre og Romsdal.

=== Hotels ===
Hurtigruten AS owned two hotels in Bergen; Neptun Hotel and Strand Hotel. The hotels were sold to Bergen Hotel in 2008.

== Ports of call ==
Hurtigruten calls at 34 ports on the Coastal Express route from Bergen to Kirkenes and back, as well as several other ports as part of the Signature sailings on the Svalbard line and the North Cape line.

Region	Ports	Sailing Route
Norway	Ålesund	Original & Signature
Norway	Alta	Signature
Norway	Åndalsnes	Signature
Norway	Båtsfjord	Original
Norway	Bergen	Original & Signature
Norway	Berlevåg	Original
Norway	Bessaker	Signature
Norway	Bodø	Original & Signature
Norway	Brønnøysund	Original & Signature
Norway	Eidfjord	Signature
Norway	Finnsnes	Original
Norway	Florø	Original
Norway	Hammerfest	Original
Norway	Harstad	Original
Norway	Havøysund	Original
Norway	Honningsvåg	Original & Signature
Norway	Kirkenes	Original
Norway	Kjøllefjord	Original
Norway	Kristiansand	Signature
Norway	Kristiansund	Original
Norway	Longyearbyen	Signature
Norway	Måløy	Original
Norway	Mehamn	Original
Norway	Molde	Original
Norway	Narvik	Signature
Norway	Nesna	Original
Norway	Ny-Ålesund	Signature
Norway	Øksfjord	Original
Norway	Olden	Signature
Norway	Ørnes	Original
Norway	Oslo	Signature
Norway	Reine	Signature
Norway	Risøyhamn	Original
Norway	Rørvik	Original
Norway	Rosendal	Signature
Norway	Sæbø	Original
Norway	Sandnessjøen	Signature
Norway	Skjervoy	Original
Norway	Skjolden	Signature
Norway	Sortland	Original
Norway	Stamsund	Original
Norway	Stavanger	Original
Norway	Stokmarknes	Original & Signature
Norway	Svolvær	Original & Signature
Norway	Geirangerfjord	Original
Norway	Hjørundfjorden	Original & Signature
Norway	Torsken	Signature
Norway	Torvik	Original
Træna	Signature	
Tromsø	Original & Signature	
Trondheim	Original	
Vadsø	Original	
Vardø	Original	
