= MS Finnmarken (2001) =

Norwegian ship

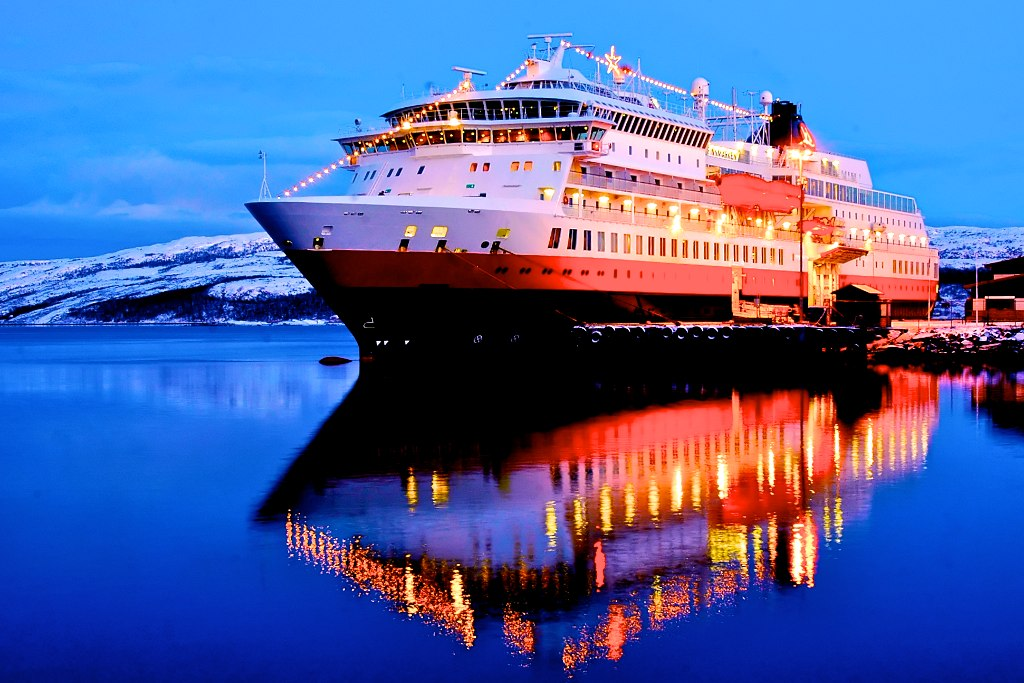
- MS Finnmarken in Kirkenes

History
- Name: Finnmarken
- Namesake: Finnmark
- Operator: Hurtigruten
- Port of registry: Tromsø, Norway
- Builder: Kleven Verft, Ulstein, Norway
- Laid down: 10 November 2000
- Launched: 15 September 2001
- Sponsored by: Torild Skogsholm
- Christened: 4 April 2002
- Maiden voyage: 6 April 2002
- Renamed: Otto Sverdrup (2021-2025)
- Identification: IMO number: 9231951; MMSI number: 259210000; Callsign: LDBE
- Status: in active service

General characteristics
- Tonnage: 15,690 GT
- Length: 138.5 m (454 ft 5 in)
- Beam: 21.5 m (70 ft 6 in)
- Height: 29.6 m (97 ft 1 in)
- Draught: 4.8 m (15 ft 9 in)
- Decks: 7 passenger
- Speed: 19 knots (35 km/h; 22 mph)
- Capacity: 526

MS Finnmarken (call sign LDBE), named MS Otto Sverdrup between 2021 and 2025, is a Norwegian coastal ship owned and operated by Hurtigruten. It was built in 2002 at Kværner Kleven, Ulsteinvik, Norway, and cost around 750 million Norwegian Kroner (nok). It was part of the Hurtigruten coastal route travelling between Bergen and Kirkenes from 2002 to 2009. In 2010 it was leased as a hotel ship in Australia. The ship returned to Norway in 2012 as a part of the coastal route. Since 2024, it has sailed bi-weekly from Hamburg to the North Cape and back as part of Hurtigruten's Signature product.

Between 2021 and April 2025 it operated under the name Otto Sverdrup. It was renamed to its original name MS Finnmarken in April 2025.

MS Finnmarken is the third Hurtigruten ship with this name. Previous ships were DS Finmarken from 1912 and MS Finnmarken from 1956, which is currently part of the Hurtigruten museum in Stokmarknes, Norway.

== Design and description ==
Finnmarken has a gross tonnage (GT) of 15,690 tons, 6,113 net tonnage (NT), and 945 tons deadweight (DWT). Loading and unloading is done with truck through a large side port on the port side. It has a car capacity of 47, 628 beds that can accommodate up to 1,000 passengers, and a top speed of 19 knots (35 km/h; 22 mph).

The ship's main engines are four-stroke diesel engines made by Wärtsilä. The engines are paired two by two. Anterior engines are 9 cylinder W9L32 with 5,630 horsepower (4,200 kW) each, and the rear are 6 cylinder W6L32 with 3,780 hp (2,820 kW) each. The stated overall performance is 18,820 hp (14,030 kW). The propulsion system is geared so that it can run in five different operating modes with both diesel-electric and conventional mechanical transmission. This allows one main engine to drive both propellers simultaneously. In addition, Finnmarken has two 1,370 hp (1,020 kW) Brunvoll FU 80 LTC 2250 thrusters at the bow and a submersible 1,650 hp (1,230 kW) Ulstein kompassthruster (azimuth pod) in the stern. Electrical power is produced by two 2500 kVA shaft generators, and a Mitsubishi S6A3-MTPA diesel emergency generator.

MS Finnmarken has a maximum capacity of 526 guests, with 224 ordinary cabins, 18 mini-suites and 14 suites. The ship has eight decks and facilities include an outdoor swimming pool, two hot tubs, fitness centre, bar, library and four conference rooms. There are three restaurants on board: Flora, Brasserie Árran and Røst.

Since 2005, both Finnmarken and MS Midnatsol have been considered for hospital ships in the event of a war. The vessel is self-sufficient in terms of water and electricity, and waste management happens on board, which means that the ship can be at sea for long periods of time. With ten days' notice, the ship should be operational as floating field hospitals. The car deck should be made to hospitals, and will house 70 doctors and nurses. As a hospital ship, Finnmarken could accommodate 200 beds in case of war, crisis or disaster, nationally or internationally.

== History ==
Plans for a new ship began in 1999. OVDS signed a construction contract with Kleven shipyard in Ulsteinvik with an option for two sister ships. Kleven had also built Hurtiguten's MS Nordkapp and MS Nordnorge. The ship was launched on 15 September 2001. On 4 April 2002 the ship was christened by Transportation Minister Torild Skogsholm, and it began its maiden voyage on 6 April 2002 from Bergen and visited Orkney, the Hebrides, Dublin, Southampton, Amsterdam, Hamburg, Copenhagen, Oslo, and Stavanger. Finnmarken began its regular route along the Norwegian coast on 20 April 2002.

During a storm on the night of 13 November 2004, Finnmarken suffered damage to an emergency exit hatch as a result of breakers. The ship began to take on water and the captain made the decision to return to Ålesund where the ship was repaired and continued on its way a day later.

The ship was leased for use as a hotel ship in connection with the development of the Greater Gorgon gas fields in Western Australia. The contract was for 18 months with the option of extending the lease for an additional 18 months, and was worth 135 million AUD. While in Australia the ship was painted all white and the car decks were converted into laundries and changing rooms. Finnmarken's return to Norway replaced MS Nordstjernen (built 1956). Before the ship returned to Norway, it was sent to Singapore in order to repaint and restore the ship to Norwegian standards. Finnmarken returned to Norway 16 February 2012 and began the regular route between Bergen and Kirkenes.

In early 2020, the ship underwent a US$35 million renovation and was renamed MS Otto Sverdrup. In 2021, the ship joined the expedition fleet of Hurtigruten. From 2024, it was added back into the Hurtigruten fleet for bi-weekly sailings to the North Cape as part of their Signature product. Consequently, it was renamed back to its original name Finnmarken during a regular drydock in April 2025.
