= Norwegian Coastal Express Museum =

Maritime museum in Stokmarknes, Norway

Coordinates: 68°34′13″N 014°54′38″E

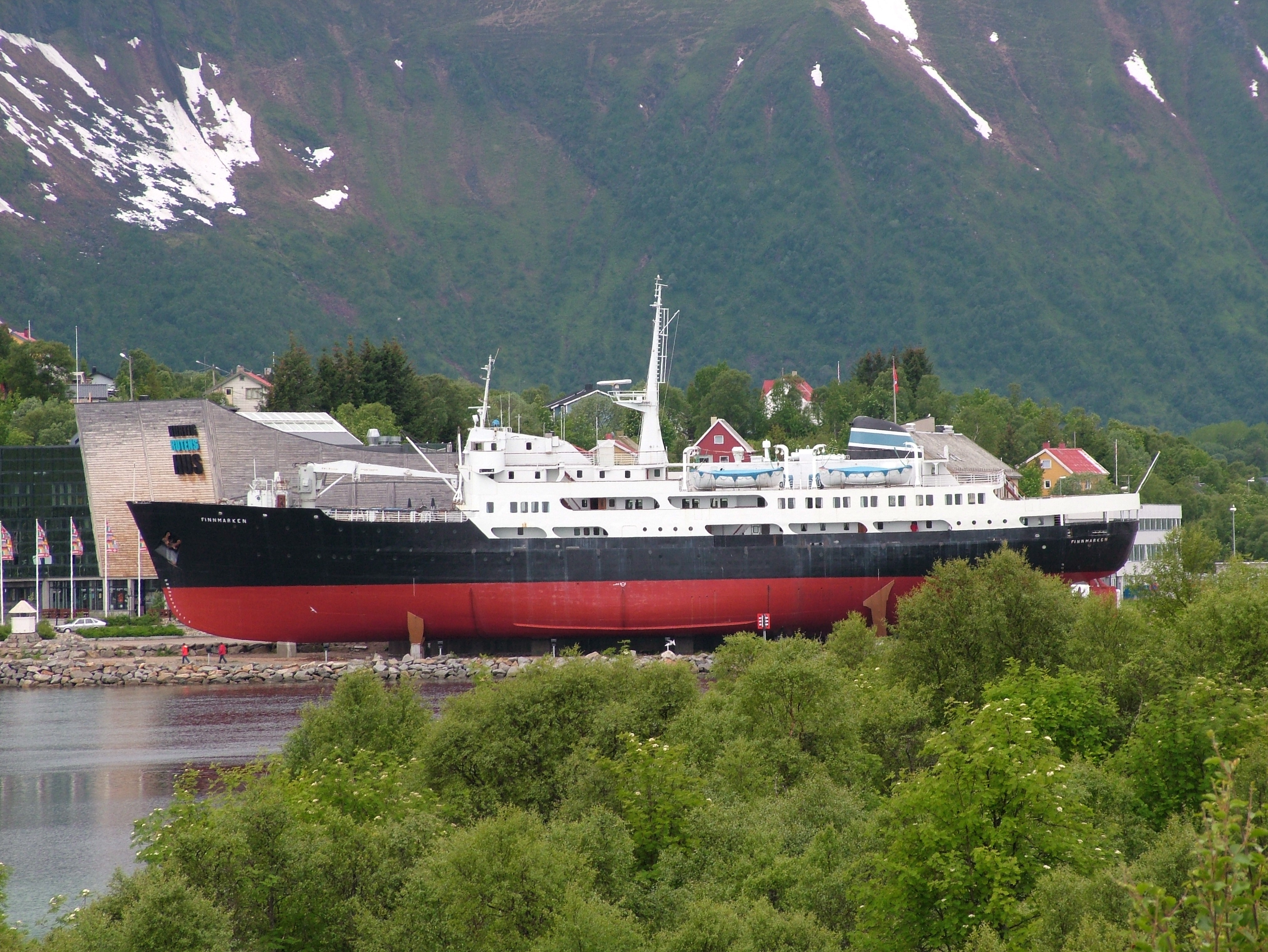
MS Finnmarken at the museum before being housed in its new building

The Norwegian Coastal Express Museum (Norwegian: Hurtigrutemuseet) is located at Richard Withs plass (Richard With Square) in Stokmarknes in Nordland county—a natural location because the Coastal Express was "born" here. The museum is operated by the Coastal Express Museum Association and it includes the former coastal express ship MS Finnmarken from the Vesterålen Steamship Company.

The museum was officially opened by Transport Minister Kjell Opseth on July 2, 1993—the 100th anniversary of the first coastal express voyage. The museum then received its premises in the old administration building of the Vesterålen Steamship Company. In 1999 the museum was relocated to a new location in the Coastal Express Building (Hurtigrutens Hus) next to the Coastal Express dock.

== Purpose ==
The articles of association of the Coastal Express Museum Association state that "The purpose of the association is to establish and operate a Coastal Express Museum at Stokmarknes." The association's tasks consist of maintaining and preserving buildings and objects belonging to the museum. This is done in cooperation with the responsible professionals at the Vesterålen Museum in Melbu. The museum showcases the history of the Coastal Express for visitors and is an information center for coastal culture and a professional resource for schools, institutions, and organizations involved in cultural protection.

== History ==
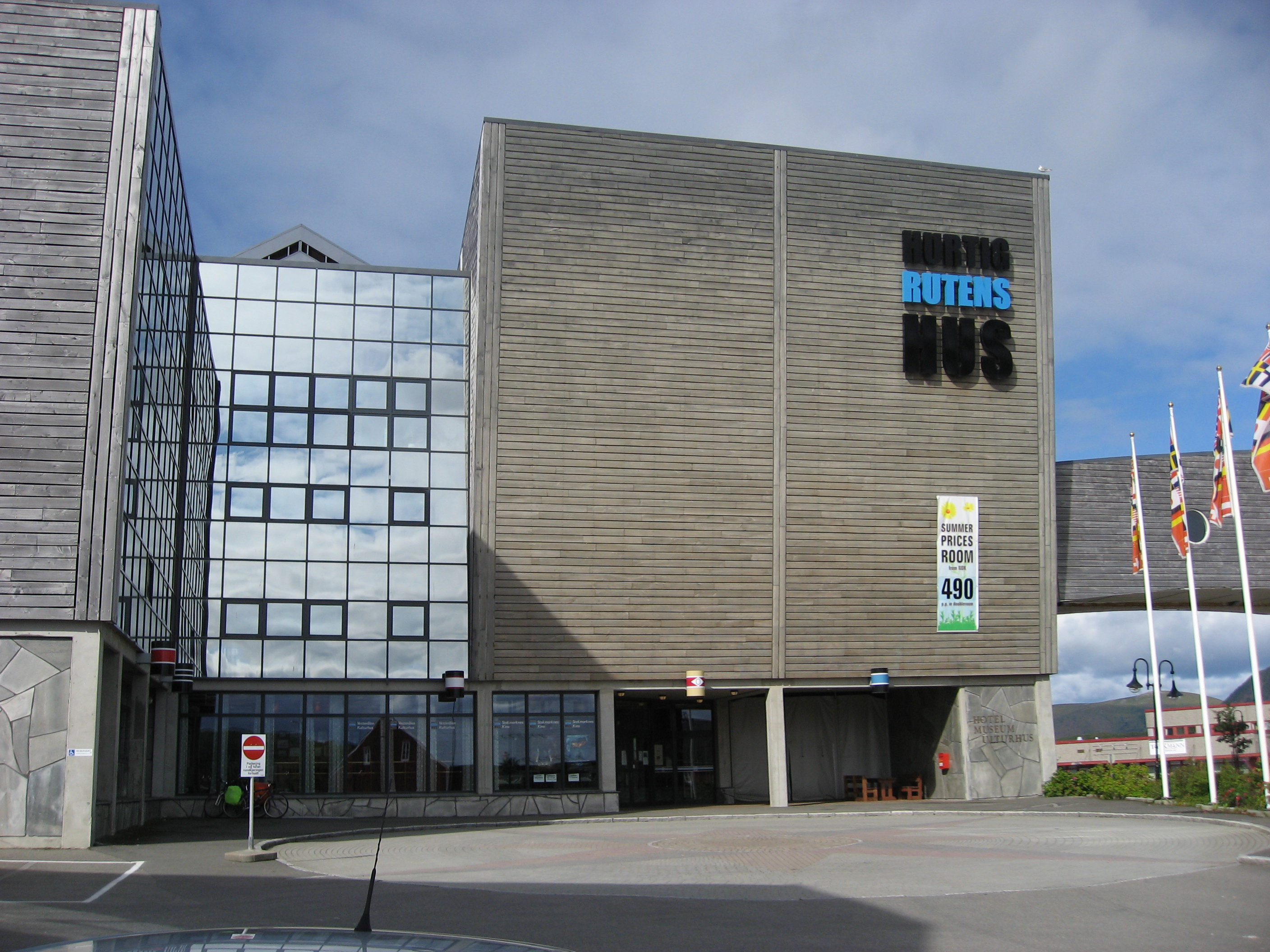
The Coastal Express Building (Hurtigrutens Hus) at the Coastal Express Museum

The first idea for creating a museum in Stokmarknes dedicated to the Coastal Express took shape in 1980. During the 1980s, the concept was developed into a plan and a project. An interim administration for the museum was elected in 1989, and that same year the Coastal Express Museum Association was founded. In the summer of 1991 the museum was unofficially opened; it was still limited in size and being developed. The museum was officially opened on July 2, 1993 by Transport Minister Kjell Opseth on the centenary of the day that SS Vesteraalen started the first voyage from Trondheim on the coastal express route. One year later, the museum was given the retired coastal express ship Finnmarken (1956) by the Ofoten and Vesteraalen Steamship Company. On May 3, 1999, the ship travelled to the Kaarbø Shipyard in Harstad for sandblasting and preparation for moving it to land. On June 16, 1999 Finnmarken left the water and was put on display at the Coastal Express Museum.

The ship suffered from water damage after being moved ashore, and a temporary roof and tarpaulin were installed on the ship in an effort to limit further damage, whilst it was decided how and whether Finnmarken was to be preserved. A committee led by the Nordland county municipality delivered its report on January 25, 2007. Several solutions were outlined, including installing a new building around the entire ship at a cost of NOK 70 to 140 million. The cheapest option was to cut up the ship (at a cost around NOK 19 million). A third possibility was to let the ship stand outdoors as it was, with minor superstructures at a cost of NOK 36 million. The report concluded that most of the costs of the Coastal Express Museum are connected with maintaining Finnmarken. The state provided funds to build the temporary roof to prevent further deterioration while discussing the matter. The Ministry of Transport and Communications insisted that local funding of the museum's operation was a prerequisite when funds were provided to move the ship to land.

At the beginning of 2009, the Coastal Express Museum and Hurtigruten entered into an agreement that round-trip passengers on the express route would receive free admission to the museum in return for the museum receiving NOK 25 per visitor from the express route. This led to a 140% increase in visitor numbers in the first quarter of 2009 of compared to the first quarter of 2008.

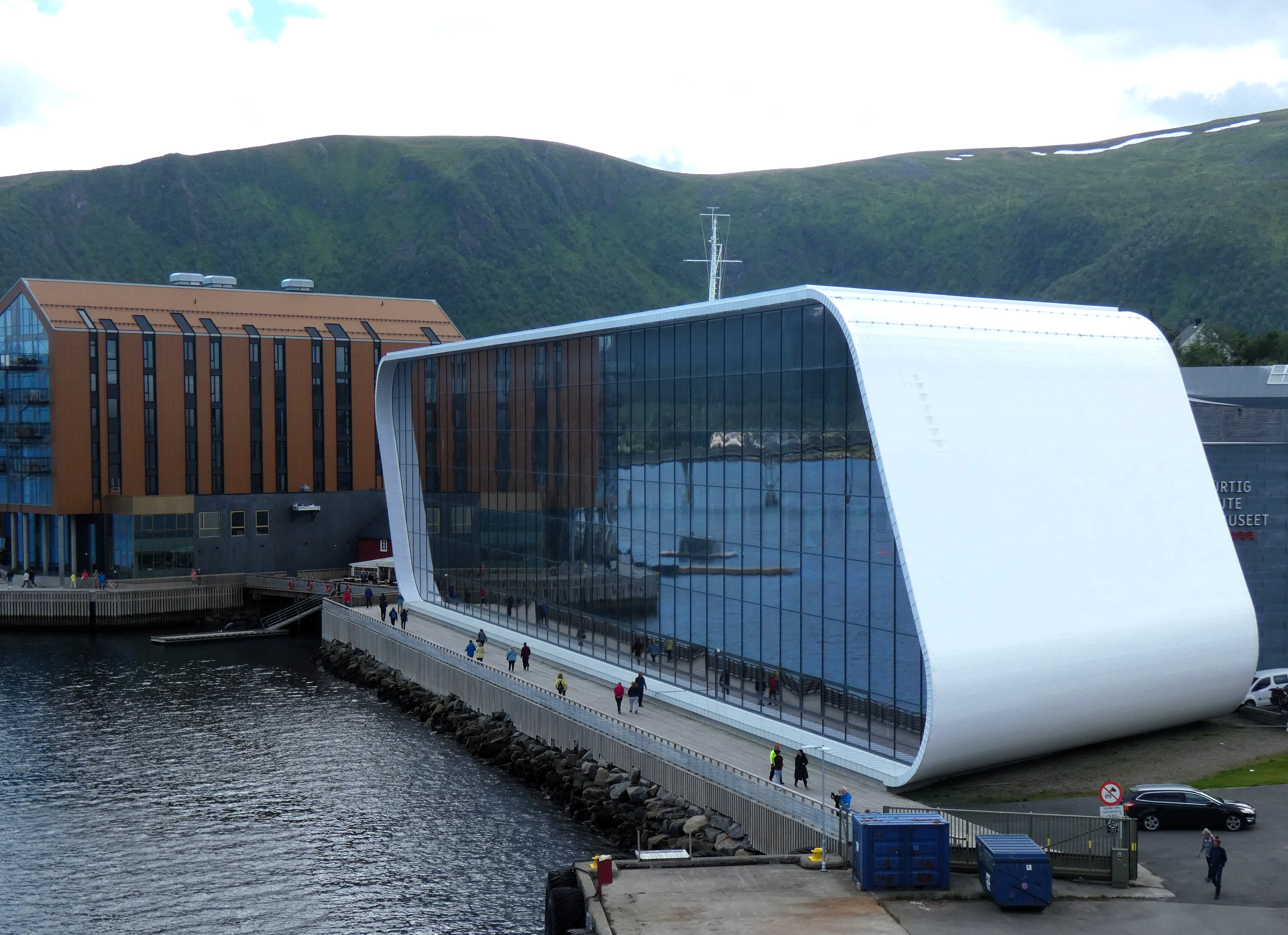
The new building housing the Finnmarken

On February 25, 2009, the Nordland County Council approved a grant of NOK 20 million to the Coastal Express Museum, on the understanding that the municipality of Hadsel contribute another 20 million, and the state 60 million. On June 18, 2009, the Hadsel Municipal Council decided to provide guarantees of NOK 20 million. Including the government's contribution, NOK 100 million was made available to build a permanent protective structure over Finnmarken. It was also decided to establish a municipal enterprise to build and serve as the owner of a newer and more compact Coastal Express Museum.

The foundation stone of a new home for the Finnmarken was laid in 2019, and officially opened on 28 August, 2021 by Abid Raja, Minister of Culture and Equality.
