= MS Nordnorge (1996) =

Hurtigruten ship

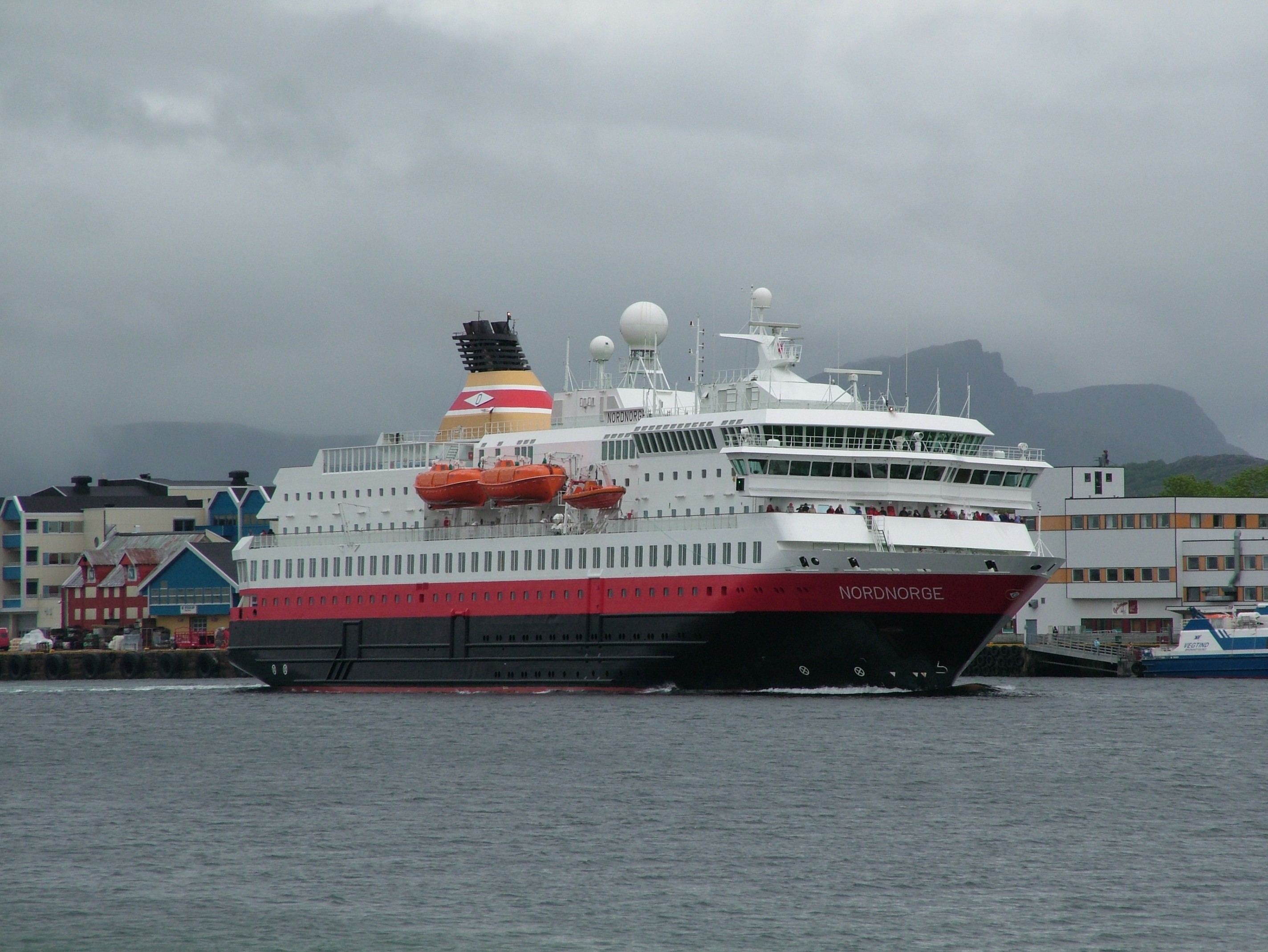
- MS Nordnorge at Brønnøysund, Norway

History
- Name: Nordnorge
- Owner: 1997–2006: Ofotens og Vesteraalens Dampskibsselskab; 2006—present: Hurtigruten
- Operator: Hurtigruten
- Builder: Kværner Kleven, Ulsteinvik, Norway
- Yard number: 266
- Launched: 6 July 1996
- Christened: 20 March 1997; by Sissel Rønbeck
- In service: 19 March 1997
- Home port: Narvik, Norway
- Identification: IMO number: 9107784; Call sign LCJI
- Status: In service

General characteristics
- Class & type: Polarlys class cruiseferry
- Tonnage: 11,286 GT
- Length: 123.30 m (404.53 ft)
- Beam: 19.50 m (63.98 ft)
- Height: 29.87 m (97 ft 11 in)
- Draught: 4.90 m (16.08 ft)
- Installed power: 2 × MAK 6M552C diesel engines; combined 9000 kW
- Speed: 18 kn (33.34 km/h)
- Capacity: 691 passengers (in coastal service); 464 passengers (in cruise service); 464 passenger beds

MS Nordnorge (literally: Northern Norway) is a Hurtigruten ship. It was completed in 1997 by Kværner Kleven in Ulsteinvik, Norway, as a sister ship to MS Polarlys and MS Nordkapp. The Nordnorge has a gross tonnage of 11,386, a crew of 57 and can carry up to 691 passengers.

Since 2002 the Nordnorge has been employed in Antarctic cruise service during the Northern Hemisphere winter.

There have been four Hurtigruten ships with the name of Nordnorge, which is Norwegian for "Northern Norway"; the common name of the three northern Norwegian counties.

During 2009 Nordnorge did not operate on the coast of Norway. The ship was hired out at the end of 2008 as a hotel ship in the Mediterranean, possibly in Venice.

== Rescues ==
On 30 January 2007 the Nordnorge came to the aid of the MS Nordkapp after the Nordkapp ran aground in the Antarctic. All 294 passengers were safely evacuated from the Nordkapp and were taken to Ushuaia, Argentina.

On 23 November 2007 the Nordnorge was involved in the rescue of all passengers and crew from the MS Explorer after the Explorer struck an iceberg in the Antarctic. All 100 passengers and 54 crew on the Explorer were safely rescued; the Explorer later sank.

== Live television broadcast ==
On 16 June 2011, the Norwegian Public Service broadcaster NRK2 started transmitting live and non-stop footage of MS Nordnorge during its 134-hour voyage from Bergen to Kirkenes. During the voyage the stream was mostly live except for brief moments when the ship was out of satellite coverage. During such occasions, a pre-recorded backup from an earlier journey at the same location was shown until live coverage was restored.
