= MS Nordlys (1994) =

Ferry/cruise ship operated by Hurtigruten

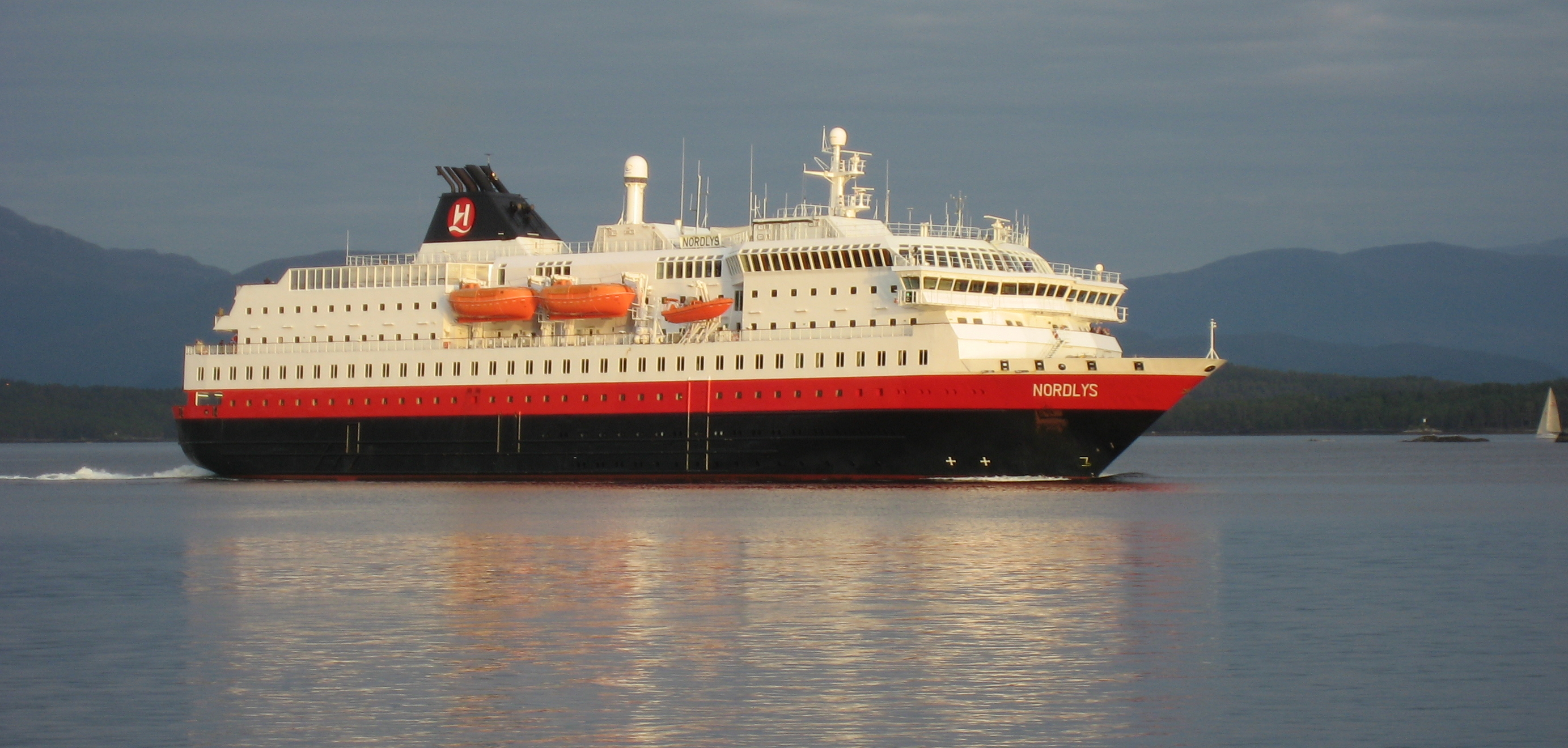
- MS Nordlys departing Molde, 2008

History
- Name: Nordlys
- Owner: 1994–2003: Troms Fylkes Dampskibsselskap; 2003–: Kirberg Shipping KS
- Operator: 1994–2006: Troms Fylkes Dampskibsselskap; 2006–: Hurtigruten
- Port of registry: Tromsø, Norway
- Route: Bergen–Kirkenes
- Builder: Volkswerft GmbH, Stralsund, Germany
- Yard number: 102
- Laid down: 16 October 1992
- Launched: 13 August 1993
- Christened: 22 March 1994
- Acquired: 16 March 1994
- Maiden voyage: 22 March 1994
- In service: 4 April 1994
- Identification: IMO number: 9048914; Call sign: LHCW; MMSI: 259139000
- Status: Active

General characteristics
- Type: Passenger/Car ferry
- Classification: Det Norske Veritas
- Tonnage: 11,204 GT; 4,153 NT; 850 DWT
- Length: LOA 121.8 m (399 ft 7 in); LBP 103.8 m (340 ft 7 in)
- Beam: 19.2 m (63 ft 0 in) (hull); 23.783 m (78 ft 0.3 in) (max)
- Height: 29,7 m (97 ft 5 in)
- Draught: 4.7 m (15 ft 5 in)
- Depth: 10.3 m (33 ft 10 in)
- Ice class: 1C
- Main engines: 2 × MaK 6M552C (2 × 4,500 kW)
- Auxiliary generators: 2 × BMV KRG-8; Two shaft generators
- Propulsion: 2 × KaMeWa 94XF3/4 CPP; 2 × Brunvoll FU63 LTC bow thruster
- Speed: 18 kn (33 km/h; 21 mph)
- Capacity: 691 passengers; 482 berths; 50 cars
- Crew: 55

MS Nordlys is a Norwegian-registered cruise ship operated by Hurtigruten. She was built by Volkswerft GmbH in Stralsund, Germany in 1994. She has two sister ships, Kong Harald and Richard With which also sail for Hurtigruten. The ship caught fire in September 2011 while sailing off Ålesund, Norway.

== Description ==
The Nordlys is 121.8 metres (399 ft 7 in) long overall and 103.8 metres (340 ft 7 in) at the waterline. The beam and depth of her hull are 19.20 metres (63 ft 0 in) and 10.30 metres (33 ft 10 in), respectively, but the maximum breadth at the bridge wings is 23.783 metres (78 ft 0.3 in). The draught of the ship is 4.7 metres (15 ft 5 in). The gross tonnage of the Nordlys is 11,204, net tonnage 4,153 and deadweight tonnage 850 tonnes. The ship has capacity for 691 passengers in 482 berths and her cargo deck can accommodate 50 cars. She is served by a crew of 55.

The Nordlys has two six-cylinder MaK 6M552C medium-speed diesel engines, each producing 4,500 kilowatts (6,000 hp) and giving her a service speed of 18 knots (33 km/h; 21 mph), coupled to KaMeWa controllable-pitch propellers through Lohmann & Stolterfoht reduction gears. On board the electricity is produced by two BMV KRG-8 auxiliary diesel generators and two shaft generators coupled to the reduction gearboxes. For maneuvering at ports the ship has two Brunvoll bow thrusters.

== History ==
Nordlys was built by Volkswerft GmbH, Stralsund, Germany. She was yard number 102.

Nordlys was launched on 13 August 1993. She is allocated IMO number 9048914 and her port of registry is Tromsø. She was delivered to Troms Fylkes Dampskibsselskap AS on 16 March 1994. She sailed to Copenhagen, Denmark for viewing and then on to Hamburg, Germany. On 22 March, she was christened in Oslo, Norway before sailing to Stavanger and across the North Sea to Newcastle upon Tyne and London, United Kingdom. She entered service with Hurtigruten on the Bergen – Kirkenes route on 4 April 1994.

In November 2008, MS Nordlys was taken out of service and laid up at Åndalsnes. She returned to commercial service in 2009.

=== 2011 fire ===
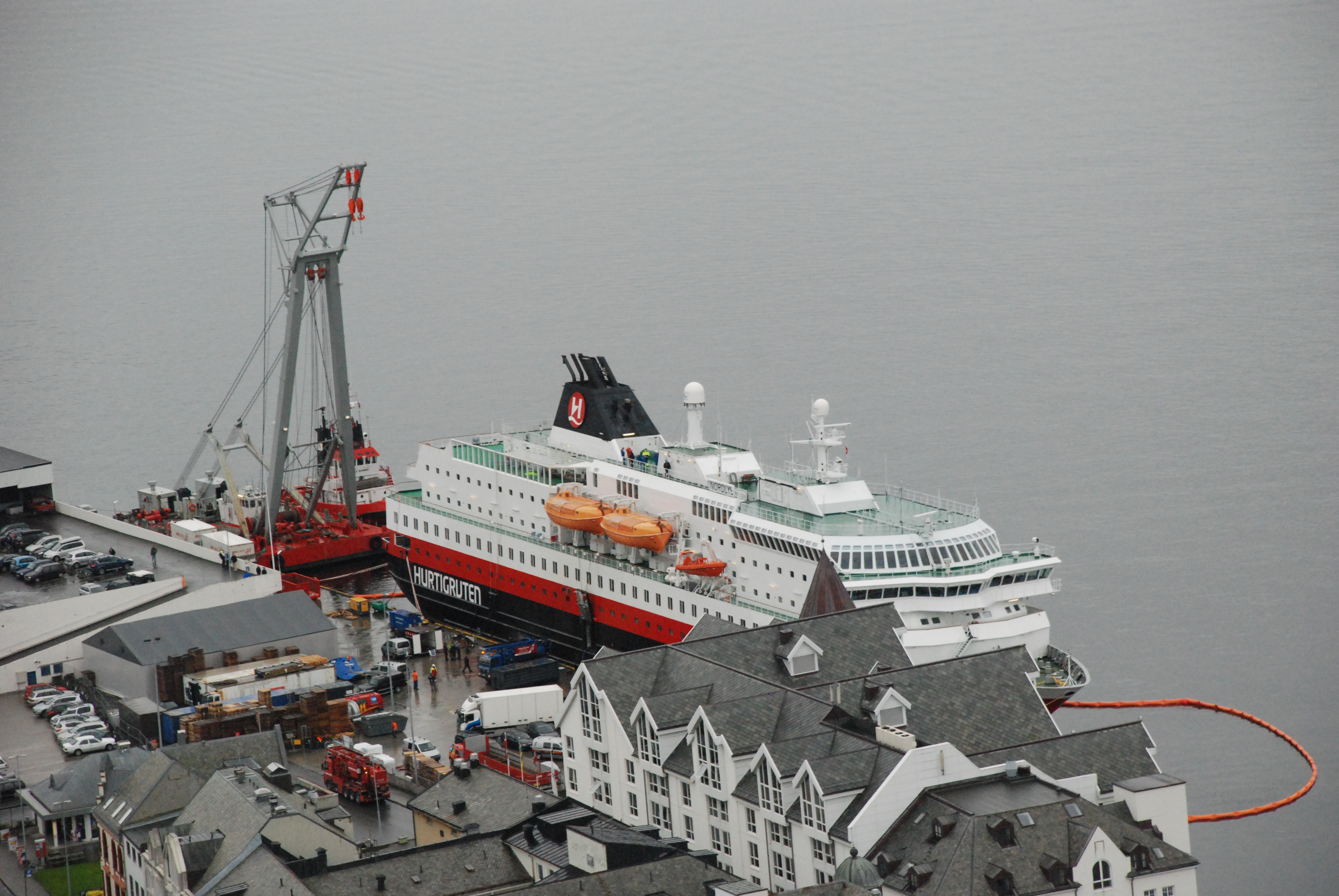
After the fire in Ålesund

On 15 September 2011 a fire in the engine room killed two people. Twelve people were injured, two of them sustaining serious injuries. Nordlys was off Ålesund, Norway at the time of the accident. All 207 passengers were taken off the ship, which was listing heavily to the port side. But some of the 55 crew remained on board to assist with fire-fighting operations.
