= MS Finnmarken =

MS Finnmarken may refer to:

- MS Finnmarken, a museum ship from 1956
- MS Finnmarken, a coastal ship launched in 2001
