= MS Polarlys =

Several motor ships have borne the name Polarlys:

- MS Polarlys (1952) was a 2,163-ton passenger/cargo ship launched on 15 March 1952 by Aalborg Vaerft in Aalborg, Denmark. Sold in 1994 to Mercy Ships whom renamed it as Caribbean Mercy. Renamed Hope II in 2007 and finally scrapped in Colon in 2010.
- MS Polarlys (1995) is an 11,341-ton passenger/cargo ship launched in 1995 by Ulstein Verft in Ulsteinvik, Norway.

== See also ==
- SS Polarlys
