= SS Nordnorge =

Two steamships have borne the name Nordnorge, after the Norwegian name for Northern Norway:

- SS Nordnorge (1883) was a 339-ton passenger/cargo ship completed as Wisingsö in 1883, by Motala Verkstad, Sweden. Torpedoed and sunk off Honningsvåg, Norway, on 24 March 1944.
- SS Nordnorge (1923) was a 991-ton passenger/cargo ship launched on 12 September 1923, by Trondhjems mekaniske Værksted in Trondheim, Norway. Shelled and sunk by warships off Hemnesberget on 10 May 1940.

== See also ==
- MS Nordnorge
