= Vesteraalens Avis =

Norwegian newspaper

Vesteraalens Avis is a Norwegian newspaper, published in Stokmarknes, Norway, and covering the district of Vesterålen. The newspaper was founded in 1892. Among its editors was Nanna With, who edited the newspaper from 1905 to 1908. The newspaper is issued three days per week. It had a circulation of 2,388 in 2008.
