= Vesteraalens Dampskibsselskab =

Norwegian ferry transport company

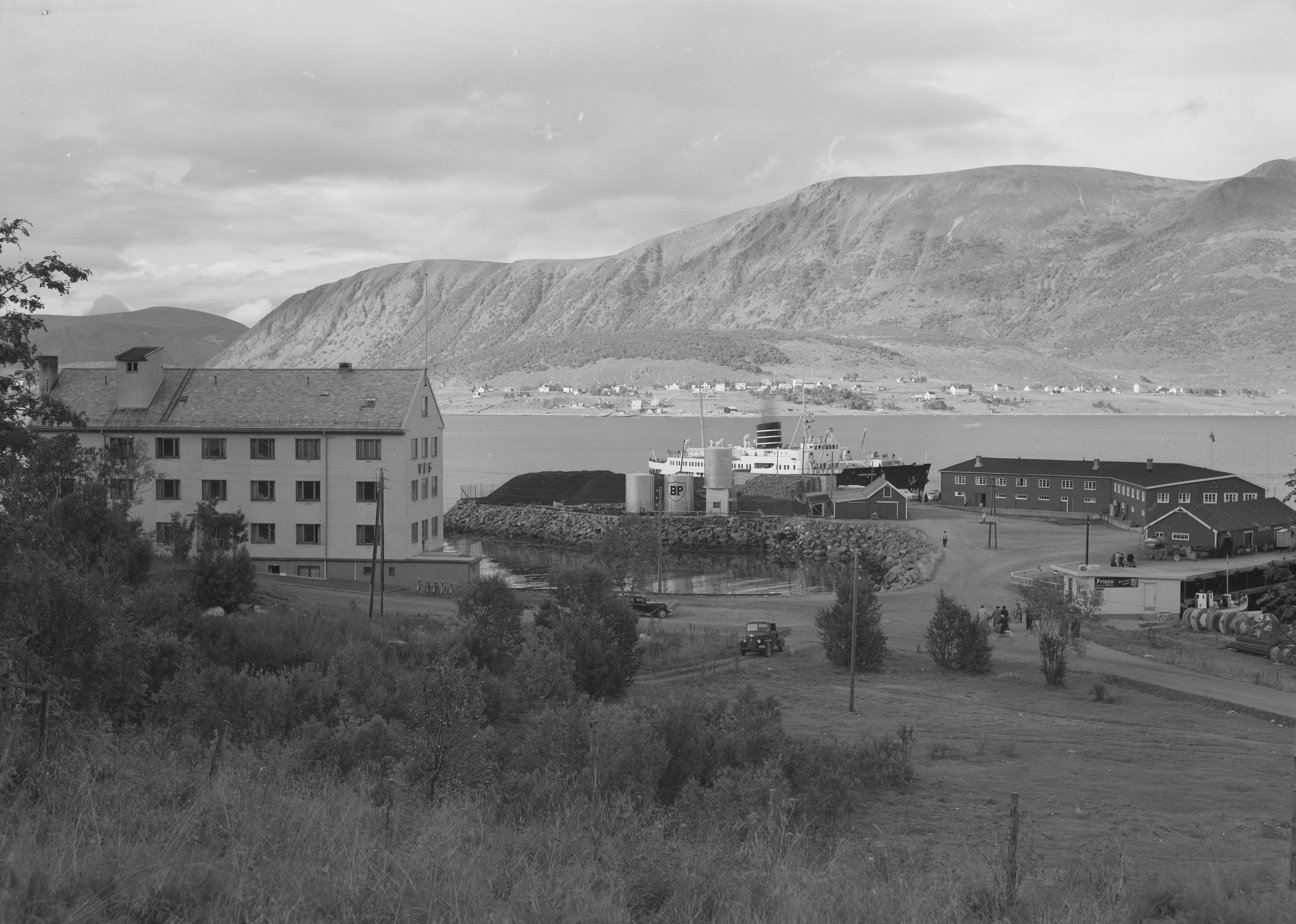

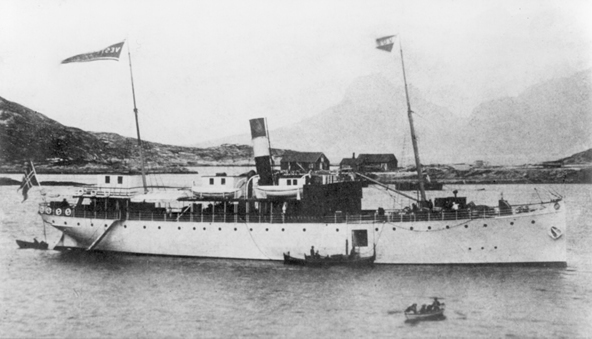
DS Vesteraalen at Bodø (1893)

Vesteraalens Dampskibsselskab was a Norwegian shipping company that operated ferries in Northern Norway.

The ferry service was founded by Richard With on 10 November 1881 at Stokmarknes in Nordland, Norway. In the same year, the shipping company's first ship - the steamer DS Vesteraalen from 1865 (ex-SS Arendal) was purchased from Arendals Dampskibsselskab. The company ran in the local transportation route, and then it started the first Coastal Express in 1893 with the ship Vesteraalen from 1891. The company merged in 1987 with Ofotens Dampskibsselskab and a new company was formed, Ofotens og Vesteraalens Dampskibsselskab (OVDS). That company merged with Troms Fylkes Dampskibsselskap in 2006 to form Hurtigruten Group.
