= MS Trollfjord =

Hurtigruten vessel

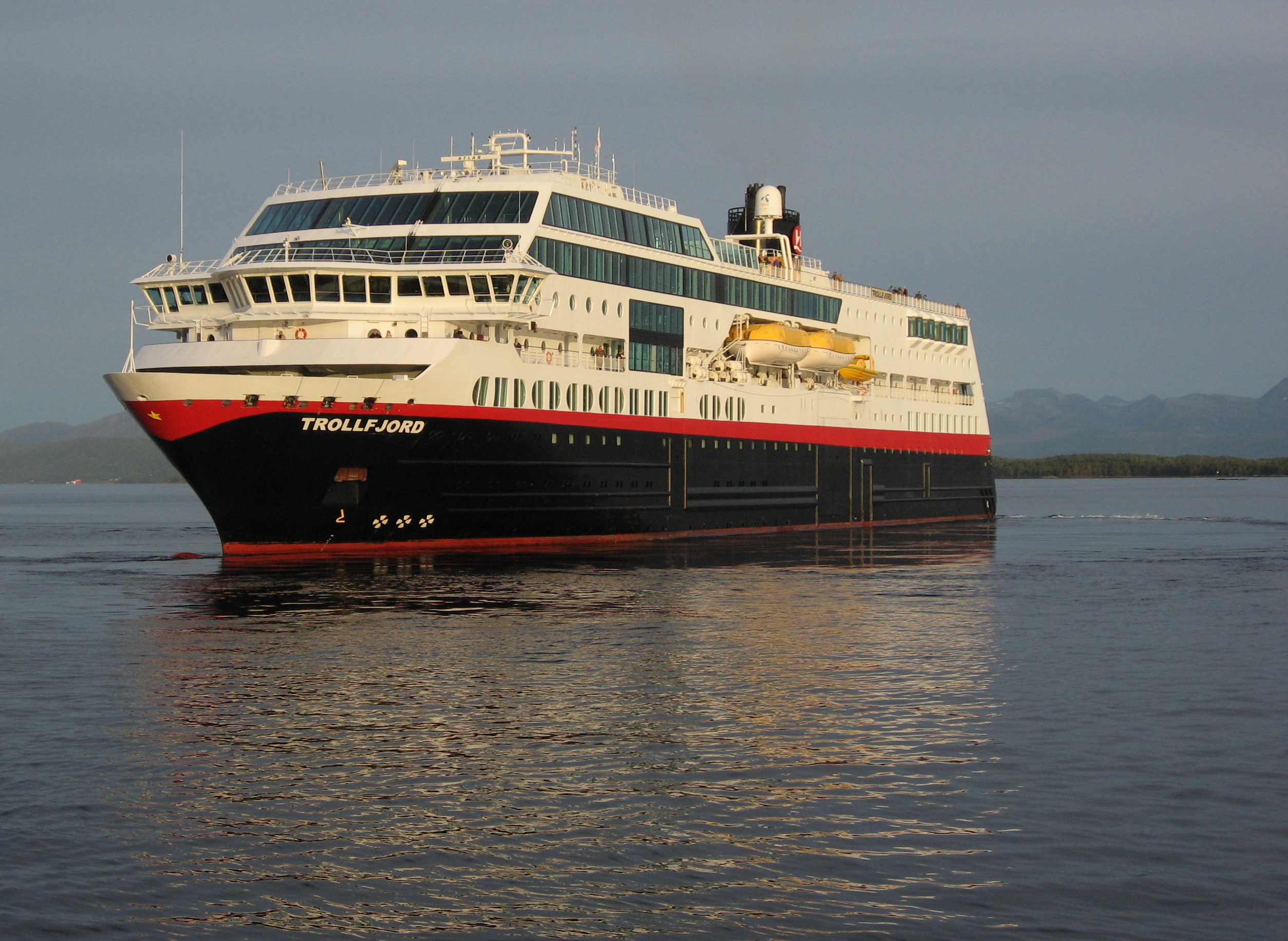
- MS Trollfjord

History
- Name: MS Trollfjord
- Operator: 2002-2006 Troms Fylkes Dampskibsselskap; 2006 - –––– Hurtigruten
- Port of registry: Tromsø, Norway
- Route: Bergen—Kirkenes
- Builder: Fosen Mekaniske Verksteder, Rissa Municipality, Norway
- Laid down: 17 October 2001
- Launched: 26 April 2002
- Identification: IMO number: 9233258; MMSI number: 258465000; Callsign: LLVT

General characteristics
- Tonnage: 16,140 GT
- Length: 135.75 m (445 ft 4 in)
- Beam: 21.5 m (70 ft 6 in)
- Height: 29.9 m (98 ft 1 in)
- Draught: 5.1 m (16 ft 9 in)
- Decks: 10
- Speed: 15 knots
- Capacity: 626 berths, 45 cars

MS Trollfjord is a Hurtigruten vessel built by Fosen Mekaniske Verksteder in Rissa Municipality, Norway in 2002. It is named after the Norwegian Trollfjord. She has a sister ship, MS Midnatsol, which also sails for Hurtigruten.

== Specifications ==
=== History ===
- Type: RoRo ferry, coastal express ferry
- Operated by: TFDS (2002–2006), Hurtigruten Group ASA (2006–present)
- Sister ship: MS Midnatsol
- Keel laid: April 2001
- Launched: October 2001
- Entered service: 2002
- Status: In service

=== Technical specifications ===
- Hull: Steel
- Length: 135.75 m
- Beam: 21.5 m
- Draft: 5.1 m
- Tonnage: 16,140 GT
- Deadweight: 1,180 t
- Propulsion: Two 9-cylinder Wärtsilä W 9L 32 diesel engines, two Rolls-Royce Aquamaster Contaz 35 azimuth thrusters, bow thrusters
- Power: 2 × 5,630 hp
- Speed: Maximum 18 knots, cruising 15 knots
- Decks: 10 (7 passenger decks)
- Cargo holds: 4

=== Other characteristics ===
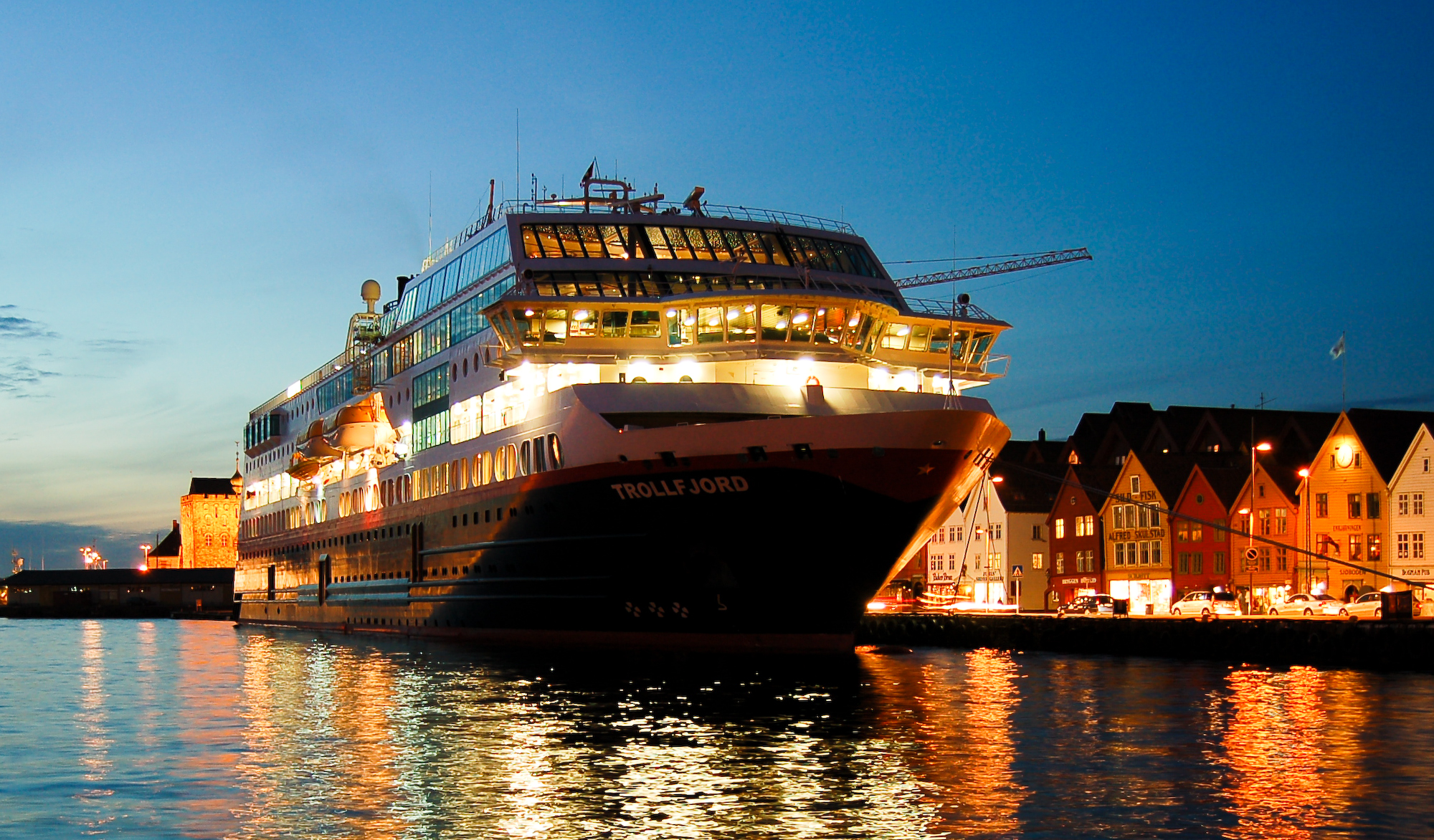
MS Trollfjord in the port of Bergen, Norway.

- Shipyard: Fosen Mekaniske Verksteder, Rissa, Norway
- Home port: Tromsø
- Crew: 74 (exclusively Norwegian)
- Cabins: 309 (652 berths)
- Capacity: 822 passengers, 45 vehicles
- Approximate travel time: 10 hours
- Cargo: General goods, coal, fuel, provisions
- Operating area: Norwegian coast, Lofoten Islands, near the Arctic, Bergen, Norway–Kirkenes route
  - Fuel consumption for a round trip on the Bergen–Kirkenes–Bergen route: 200 tons
- Flag: Norway
- IMO: 9233258Б
- International radio callsign: LLVT (Lima, Lima, Victor, Tango)
