= Sportsmanden =

Norwegian sports newspaper

Sportsmanden ('The Sportsman') was a Norwegian weekly sports newspaper.

It was established in 1913 by Magnus Brænden, absorbed the competitor Idrætsliv in 1933, and went defunct in 1965. From 1914 to 1919 the paper was edited by Nanna With, a feminist. The other editors include Magnus Brænden and Charles Hoff.
