= MS Nordkapp =

Norwegian ship

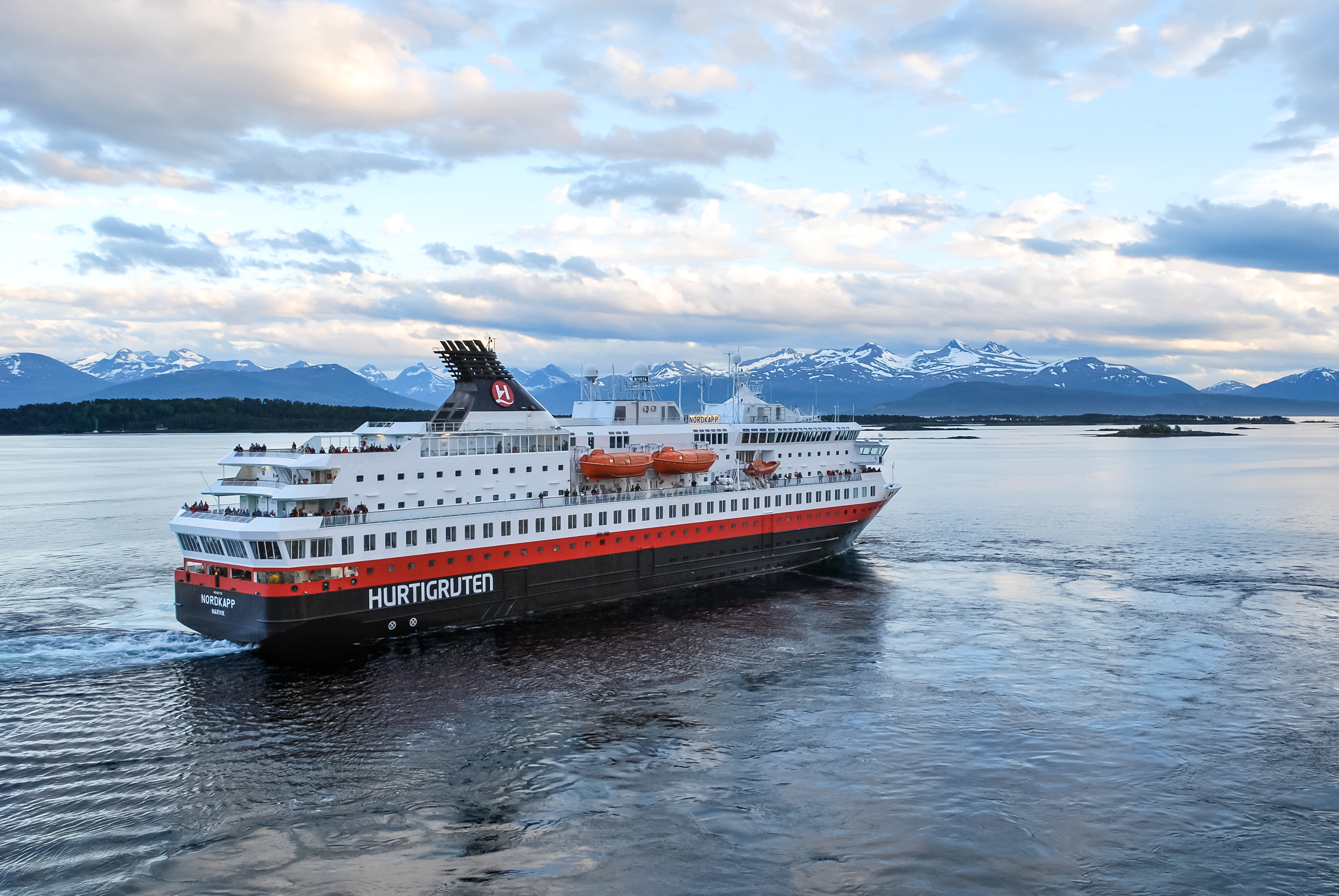
- MS Nordkapp leaving Molde, Norway.

History
- Name: Nordkapp
- Owner: 1996–2006: Ofotens og Vesteraalens Dampskibsselskab; 2006–present: Hurtigruten
- Operator: Hurtigruten
- Port of registry: Narvik, Norway
- Builder: Kværner Kleven, Ulsteinvik, Norway
- Yard number: 265
- Launched: 18 August 1995
- Christened: 23 March 1996; by Queen Sonja of Norway
- Acquired: 23 March 1996
- In service: 2 April 1996
- Identification: IMO number: 9107772
- Status: In service

General characteristics
- Class & type: Polarlys-class cruiseferry
- Tonnage: 11,386 GT; 1,104 DWT
- Length: 123.30 m (404.53 ft)
- Beam: 19.50 m (63.98 ft)
- Height: 29.87 m (97 ft 11 in)
- Draught: 4.90 m (16.08 ft)
- Installed power: 2 × MAK 6M552C diesel engines; combined 9,000 kW
- Speed: 15 knots
- Capacity: 691 passengers (in coastal service); 460 passengers (in cruise service); 460 passenger beds

Nordkapp is a Hurtigruten ship built in 1996 by Kleven Verft, Norway, for Ofotens og Vesteraalens Dampskibsselskab for use in Hurtigruten ferry service along the coast of Norway. She is a sister ship of Polarlys and Nordnorge. Nordkapp is one of 11 ships that travel the Norwegian coast from Bergen to Kirkenes.

Nordkapp (North Cape) is named after the North Cape on the island of Magerøya in Northern Norway.

== Characteristics ==
The ship has a speed of 15 knots, is 123.3 meters (404.5 feet), and weights about 11,386 gross tons.

The ship has seven decks:

- Decks 2–3, 5–6 are passenger cabins.
- Deck 4 contains the restaurant, a lounge, a small library, two conference rooms, and a café open 24-hours.
- Deck 7 features a bar/lounge and a panorama lounge.
- Deck 1 is crew quarters and is off limits to passenger guests.

Passengers can access outside decks for lounging or viewing the scenery. These can be found on:

- all sides of deck 5,
- the stern of deck 6, and
- from the sundeck and panorama lounge in the bow and stern of deck 7.

In addition to standard amenities on the ship, there an exercise room, a sauna and a children's play room/ball room.

There are 481 beds and has a passenger capacity of 691 persons. There are a combination of interior and exterior cabins of varying sizes and passenger capacities. There are also a small selection of suites available. Each standard cabin (non-suite) is equipped with either two or three single beds (not movable) and a private washroom with shower, sink, and toilet. Suite cabins have a small lounge area with a table, sofa, and chair. They also feature a double or queen-sized bed, a TV, a desk, and a minibar.

The boat can also take 45 cars on its car deck.

== History of MS Nordkapp ==
The Ofotens and Vesteraalens steamship company commissioned a new ship which was to be built at the Kværner Kleven shipyard in Ulsteinvik.

It was christened on 23 March 1996 by Queen Sonja of Norway in a double ceremony with Polarlys, which was built at a neighbouring shipyard.

On 18 February 1997, Nordkapp travelled to Trondheim to work as a hotel ship during the FIS Nordic World Ski Championships 1997

On 29 November 2001 at 7:40pm the ship suffered a total engine failure on both main engines outside Henningsvær in Lofoten. The ship dropped both anchors to avoid running aground while the evacuation was prepared, but after 2 hours the engineers managed to start the engine and the ship returned to Bodø, Norway.

In 2005, MS Nordkapp was taken out the Norwegian coastal route and put into service in the Baltic Sea before cruising Antarctica to Chile. In 2005 and 2006, Nordkapp would sail the western coast of Norway during spring, summer, and part of fall before returning to sail the Chile/Antarctica route in the winter (summer in the Southern Hemisphere). In May 2007, MS Nordkapp returned full-time to Norway's coastal route.

In January 2007, the vessel ran aground off Deception Island, part of the South Shetland Islands, without reported injuries.
