= MS Vesterålen =

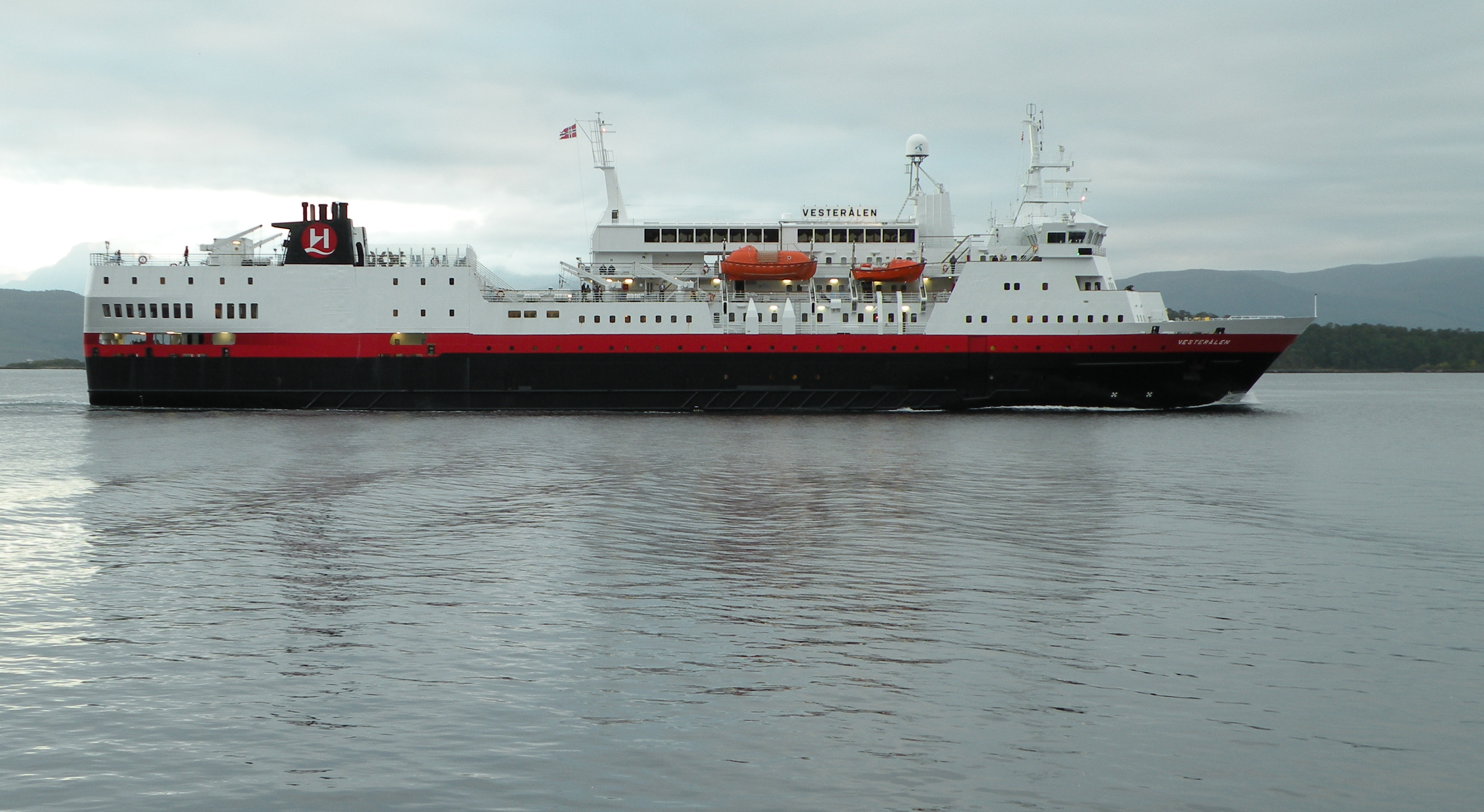
- MS Vesterålen leaving Molde.

History
- Name: MS Vesterålen
- Operator: Hurtigruten
- Port of registry: Narvik, Norway
- Builder: Harstad, Norway
- Cost: 158,000,000 Norwegian Kroner
- Yard number: 101
- Launched: 16 February 1983
- Refit: Bremerhaven, Germany (1989)
- Identification: IMO number: 8019368
- Status: in active service

General characteristics
- Tonnage: 6,261 GT
- Length: 108 m (354 ft 4 in)
- Beam: 16.5 m (54 ft 2 in)
- Height: 28,6 m (93 ft 9 in)
- Draught: 4,6 m (15 ft)
- Speed: 15 knots (27.78 km/h; 17.26 mph)
- Capacity: 510 passengers; 306 berths; 35 cars

MS Vesterålen is a passenger vessel operated by the Norwegian-based Hurtigruten. The vessel was constructed in Harstad, Norway in 1983. She was refitted in Bremerhaven, Germany in 1989 to increase passenger capacity, and then later in 1995. As of 2010, the ship operates cruises primarily along the coast of Norway.

Winter 2019 the webcam shows the ship in the docks.
