= Nanna With =

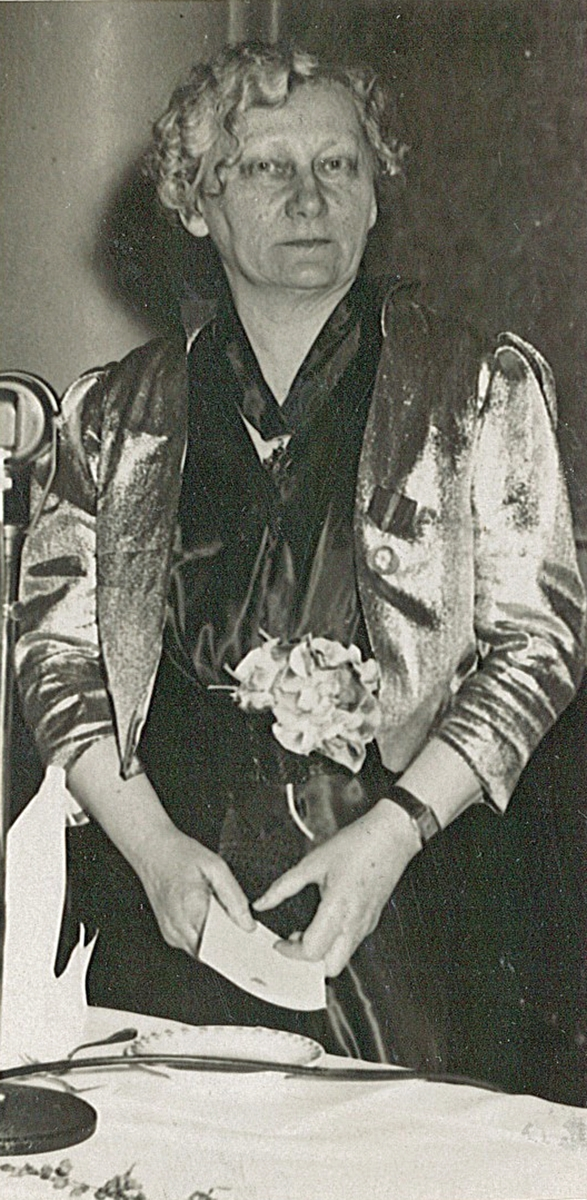
- Nanna With in the 1930s
- Born: 30 May 1874; Andenes, Norway
- Died: 22 February 1965 (aged 90)
- Occupations: journalist, voice pedagogue and organizational leader
- Parent(s): Richard With and Oline Sophie Wennberg
- Awards: King's Medal of Merit in gold (1936)

Nanna Bergitte Caroline With (30 May 1874 – 22 February 1965) was a Norwegian journalist, voice pedagogue and organizational leader.

== Early life and career ==
Born in Andenes, Norway on 30 May 1874, With was a daughter of ship owner and politician Richard With and Oline Sophie Wennberg. She was editor-in-chief of the newspaper Vesteraalens Avis from 1905 to 1907, and Hver 8. Dag from 1907 to 1919. From 1914 to 1919 she also edited a sports paper, Sportsmanden.

Her biographical dictionary Illustrert Biografisk Leksikon was published between 1916 and 1920. She founded, co-founded or chaired a number of organizations.

She was awarded the Petter Dass medal in 1912. In 1936 she received the King's Medal of Merit in gold.

Nanna With died in Oslo on 22 February 1965. She was 90 years old.
