= Santa Cruz II =

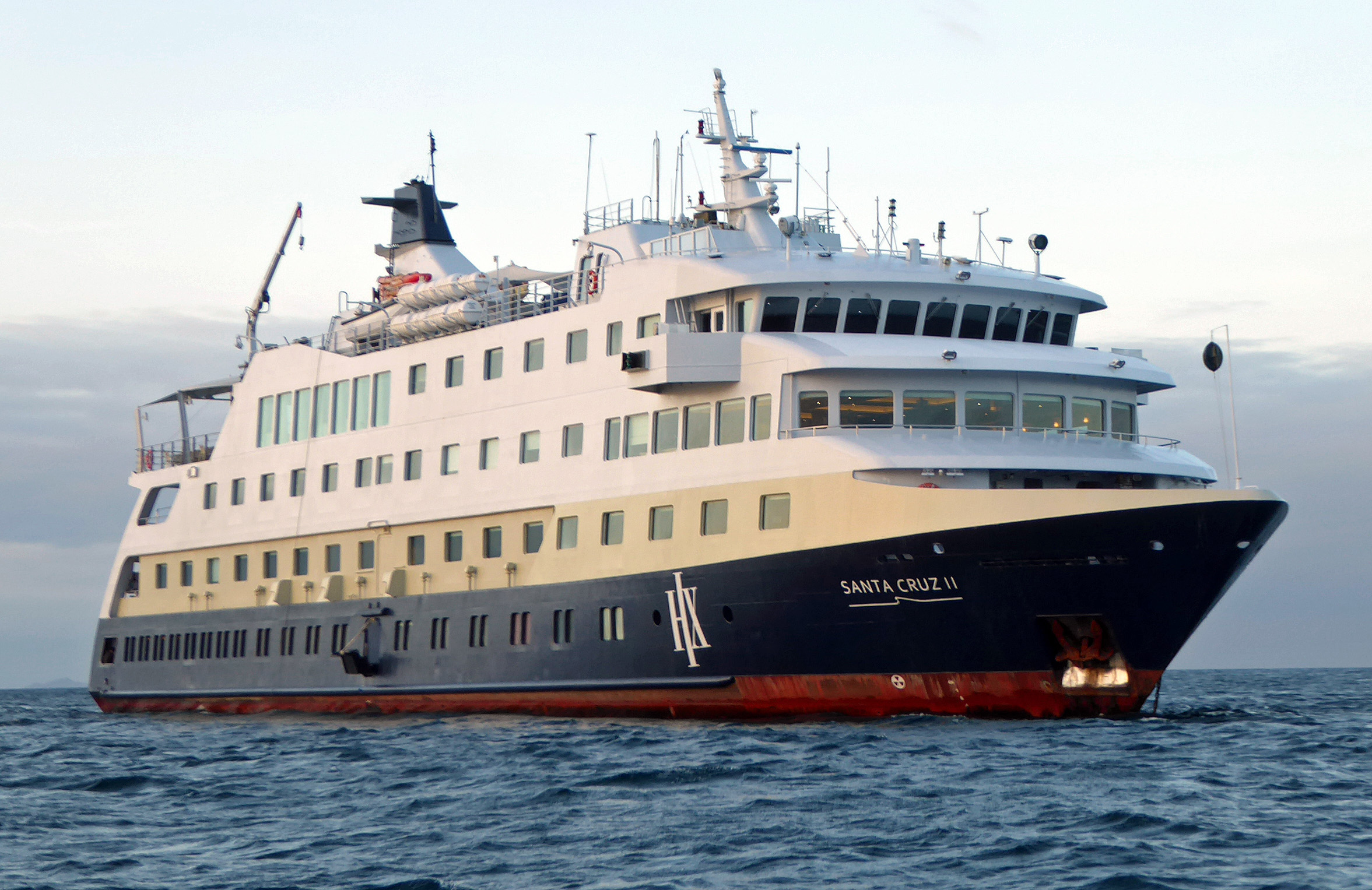

History

Ecuador
- Name: Santa Cruz II
- Owner: Metropolitan Touring company
- Identification: IMO number: 9265677; MMSI number: 735059355; Callsign: HC5781
- Refurbishment: 2015
- Construction: 2002

General characteristics
- Type: Cruise ship
- Tonnage: 2,664 GT
- Decks: 5
- Capacity: 90
- Itineraries: From 5 to 10 days

Santa Cruz II is a cruise ship operating around the Galapagos Islands for Metropolitan Touring. The ship can accommodate 90 guests housed in 50 cabins over three decks. In 2021, Metropolitan Touring announced a partnership with Hurtigruten Expeditions.
