= MS Polarlys (1995) =

Hurtigruten vessel

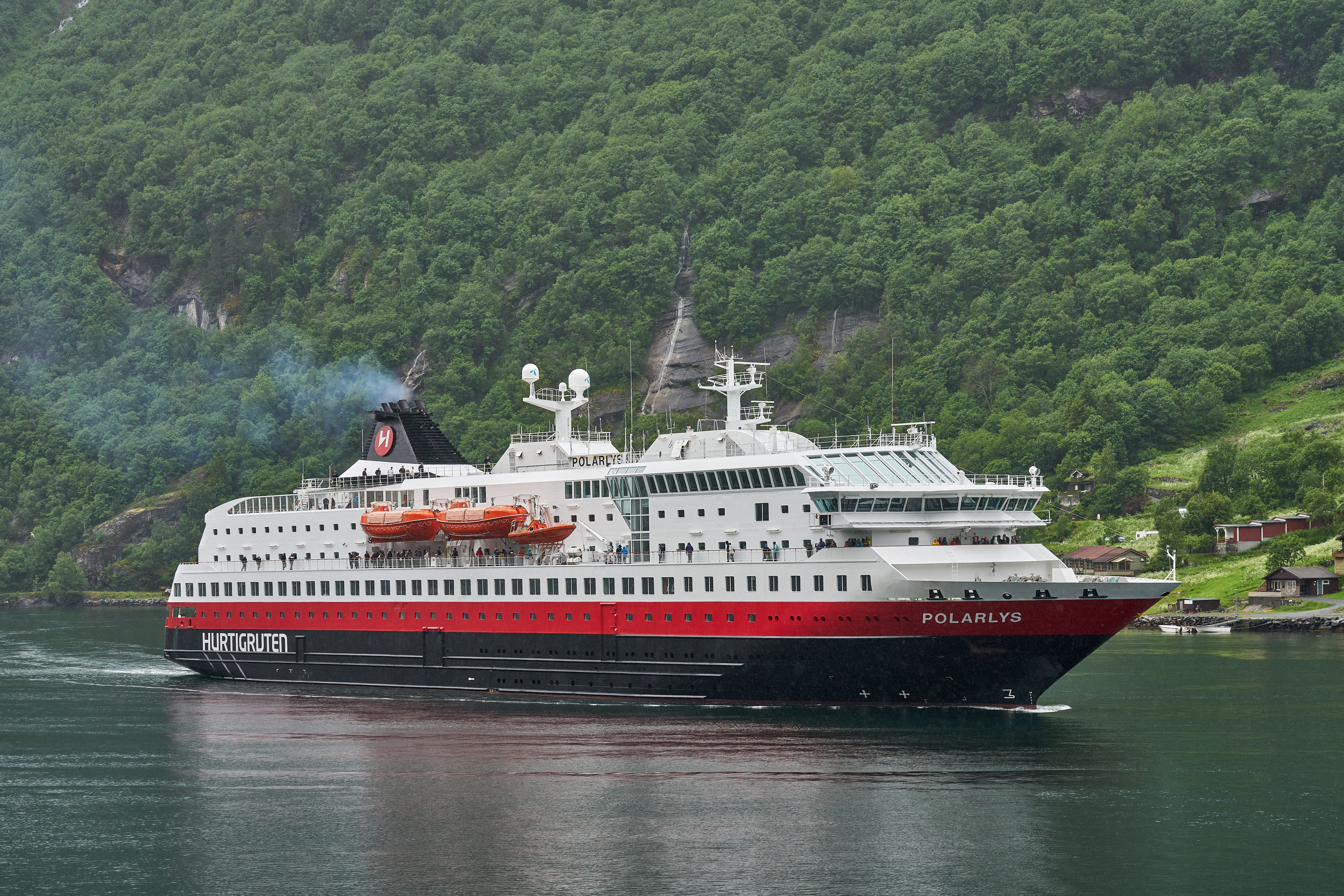
- MS Polarlys in Geirangerfiord.

History
- Name: Polarlys
- Operator: 1996-2006 : Troms Fylkes Dampskibsselskap; 2006 - –––– : Hurtigruten
- Port of registry: Tromsø, Norway
- Route: Bergen—Kirkenes
- Builder: Ulstein Verft, Norway
- Laid down: 23 January 1995
- Launched: 4 November 1995
- Identification: IMO number: 9107796

General characteristics
- Type: Ferry
- Tonnage: 11,341 GT; 4,171 NT; 1,150 DWT
- Length: 123 m (404 ft)
- Beam: 19.5 m (64 ft)
- Height: 29.60 m (97 ft 1 in)
- Draught: 4.7 m (15 ft)
- Depth: 10.3 m (34 ft)
- Ice class: 1C
- Speed: 15 knots (28 km/h; 17 mph)
- Capacity: 737 passengers, 479 berths, 35 cars

MS Polarlys is a Hurtigruten vessel built by Ulstein Verft in Ulstein Municipality, Norway in 1996. It is named after the Aurora polaris and is the third Hurtigruten vessel to bear the name after this phenomenon. The MS Polarlys last received a refurbishment in 2016.
