= Richard With =

Norwegian politician

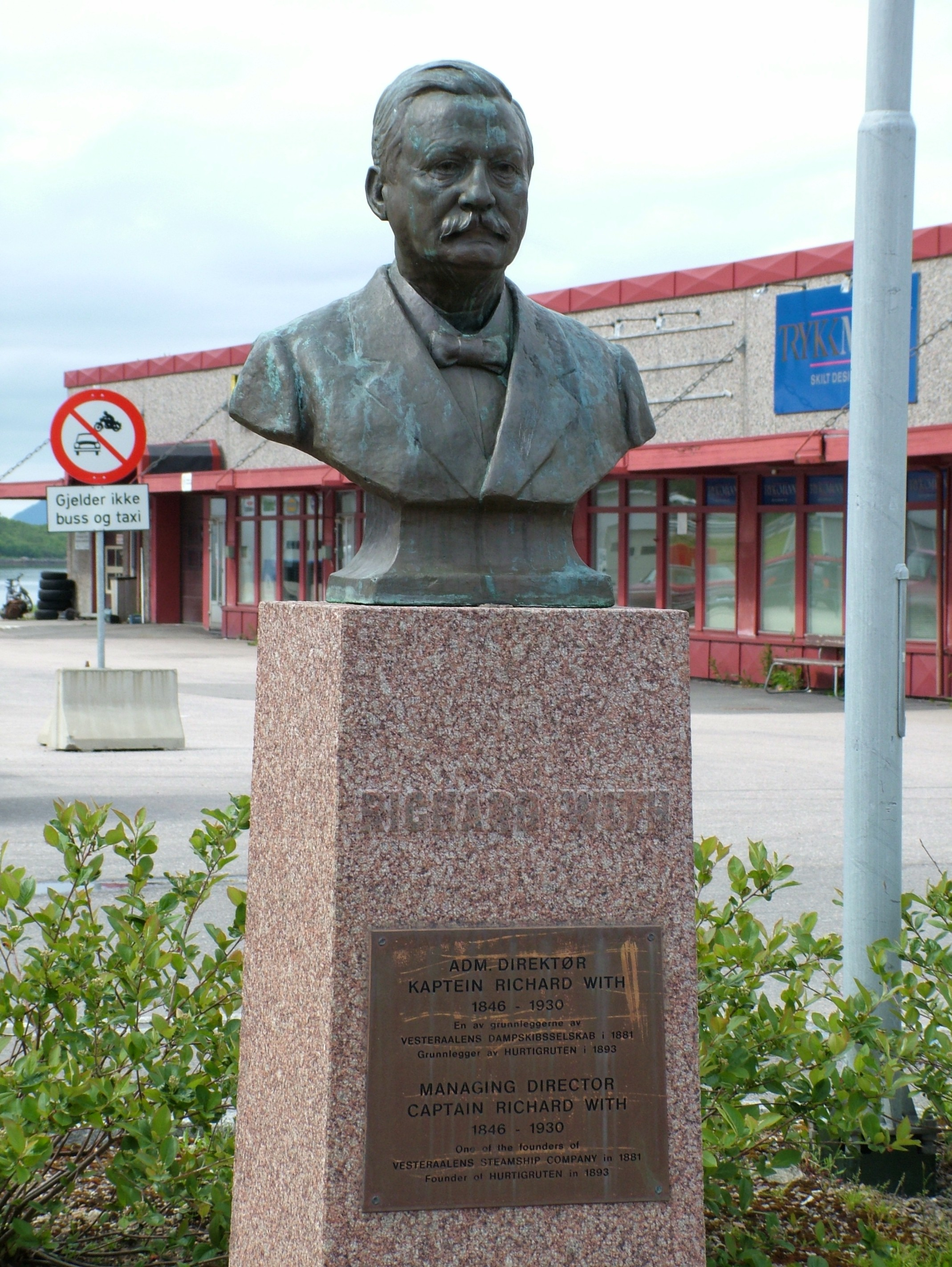
Bust of Richard With Stokmarknes, Norway

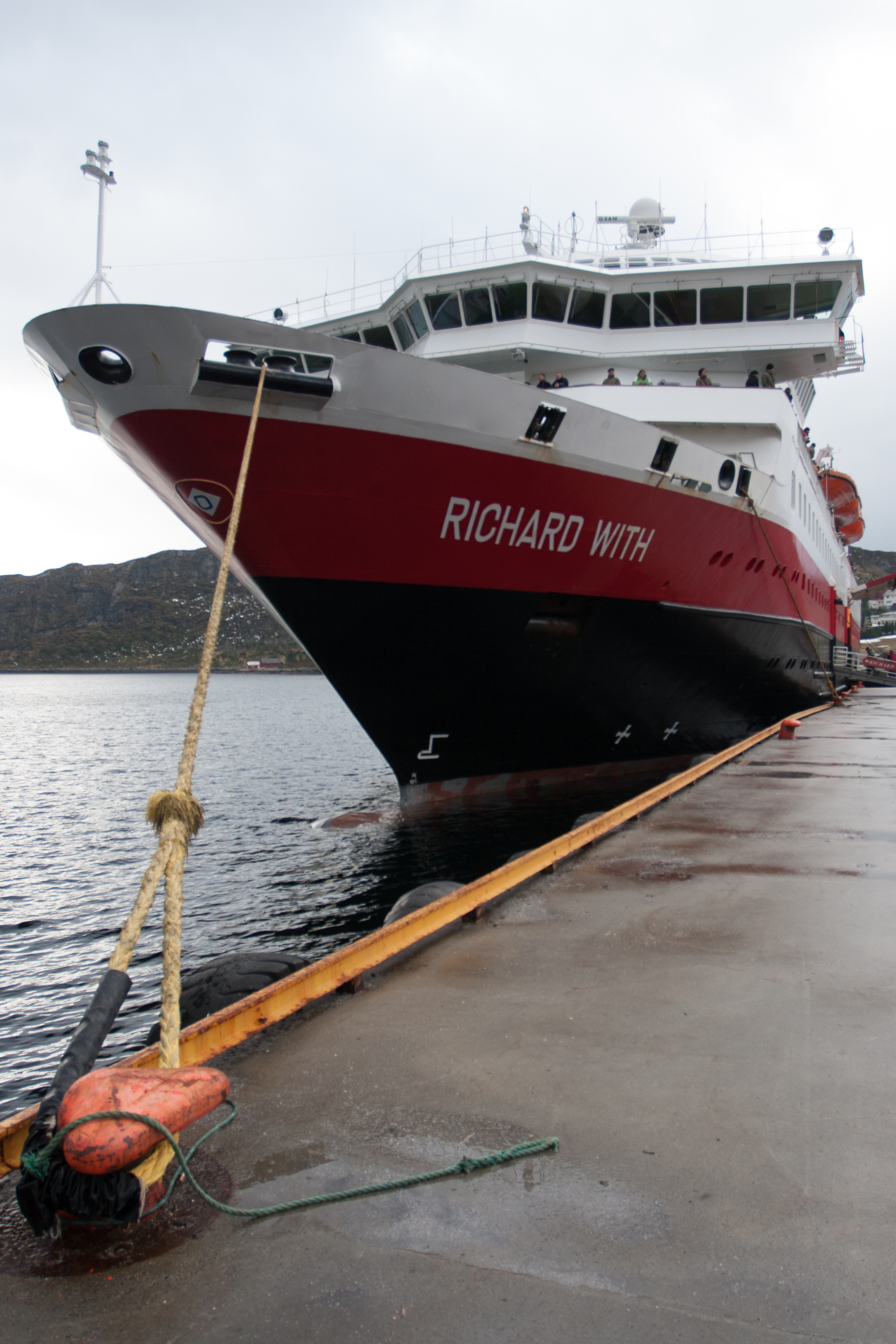
MS Richard With

Richard Bernhard With (18 September 1846 – 9 February 1930) was a Norwegian ship captain, businessman, and politician for the Liberal Left Party. He is known as the founder of the shipping companies Vesteraalens Dampskibsselskab and Hurtigruten.

== Background ==
Richard Bernhard With was born at Tromsø in Troms, Norway. He was a son of shipmaster Sivert Regnor With (1810–97) and his wife Anne Bergitte Dahl (1814–ca 1875). His father was of Dutch descent and became a pioneer in shipping from Tromsø. With took the mate's examination in Trondheim during 1864, and then spent eight years at sea.

In 1873 he settled in Risøyhamn as a merchant. In September the same year he married Oline Sophie Wennberg (1844–1878) in nearby Andenes. They had the child Nanna With in 1874. After the death of his first wife, he married her sister Augusta Septimia Wennberg (1847–1938).

== Career ==
Richard With realized a growing transportation need in the region, particularly due to the widespread herring fishing, and was the driving force in the creation of the ferry service Vesteraalens Dampskibsselskab in 1881. Two new ships were acquired in the 1880s; SS Lofoten was built and SS Fiskeren was bought. Trade routes were set up between Lofoten, Vesterålen and Senja in the north and Bergen in the south.

In 1891, With took up the idea of establishing a year-round passenger route along the coast of Norway. In 1893 the Parliament of Norway agreed to the government's proposal of funding the route—Hurtigruten—with 70,000 kr. The route Trondheim–Hammerfest (in the summer: Trondheim–Tromsø) would be sailed weekly, and SS Vesteraalen was the first ship to sail on 2 July 1893.

In 1894, With retired as a shipmaster and instead became CEO of Vesteraalens Dampskibsselskab. He remained here until 1909. From 1896, Vesteraalens Dampskibsselskab used SS Lofoten for a passenger route between Hammerfest and Adventfjorden. The shipmaster was renowned polar explorer Otto Sverdrup, and the route propelled growth of a modern society in the Svalbard archipelago. In 1908, With became involved in the work to create the Norwegian America Line. At its establishment in 1910, he served as deputy chairman of the board.

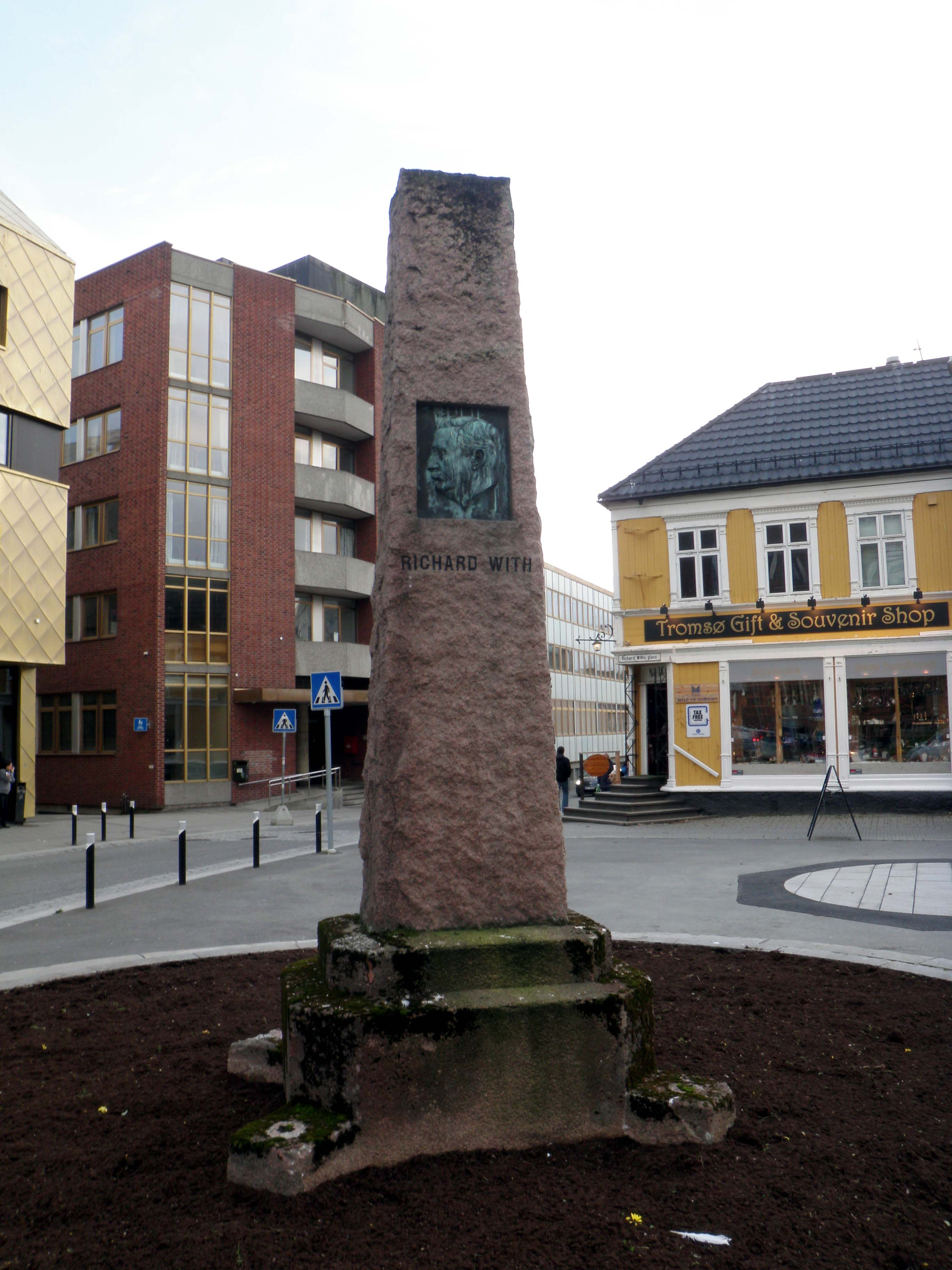
Richard With memorial stone Richard Withs plass in Tromsø

With had been involved in local politics. He served as a member of the Parliament of Norway for the constituency Vesteraalen from 1910 to 1912. He then remained in Kristiania (now Oslo) and lived here until his death in February 1930. In 1896, he was made Knight 1st Class of the Royal Norwegian Order of St. Olav. With was a leader of the Nordlendingenes Forening, an association of former residents who had relocated from the counties of Nordland, Troms and Finnmark in Northern Norway. He was awarded the Petter Dass Metal (Petter Dass-medaljen) during the association's 50th anniversary in 1912.

== Legacy ==
His name has been used for two Hurtigruten ships: SS Richard With (1909) and current MS Richard With (1993). In Tromsø there is a square named Richard Withs plass, while roads are named after him (Richard Withs gate or Richard Withs vei) in Andenes, Trondheim, Bodø, Sandnessjøen, Stokmarknes and Vardø.
