= MS Nordnorge =

Two motor ships have borne the name Nordnorge:

- MS Nordnorge (1964) was a 2,611-ton passenger/cargo ship launched on 1 February 1964, by Akers mekaniske verksted of Oslo, Norway. Renamed twice in 1996, lastly as Island Explorer. Scrapped at Alang, India, in 2006.
- MS Nordnorge (1996) is an 11,286-ton passenger/cargo ship launched on 6 July 1996, in Ulsteinvik, Norway.
