= MS Midnatsol =

Ship of Hurtigruten

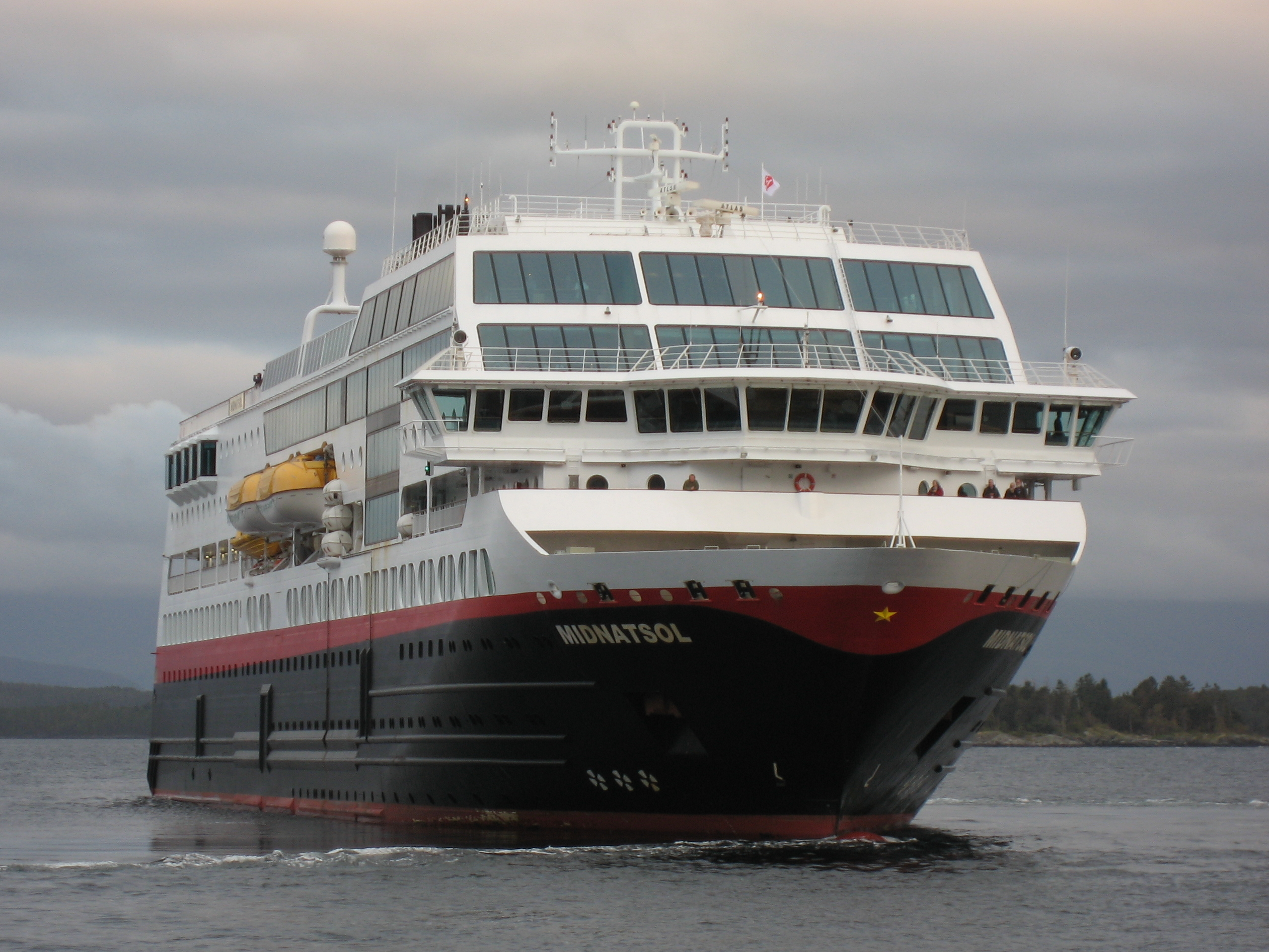

History
- Name: Midnatsol; formerly Maud, name restored from late 2024
- Operator: Hurtigruten
- Port of registry: Tromsø, Norway
- Route: Bergen—Kirkenes
- Builder: Bruces Verkstad, Sweden + Fosen Mekaniske Verksteder, Rissa Municipality, Norway
- Yard number: 73
- Laid down: 17 October 2000
- Launched: 26 April 2001
- Christened: 22 March 2001
- Completed: 11 March 2001
- Identification: Call sign: LEFO; IMO number: 9247728; MMSI number: 258595000; DNV ID: 23321

General characteristics
- Class & type: passenger ship
- Tonnage: 16,151 GT; 6,353 NT
- Length: 135.75 m (445 ft 4 in)
- Beam: 21.5 m (70 ft 6 in)
- Height: 29.9 m (98 ft 1 in)
- Draught: 5.1 m (16 ft 9 in)
- Decks: 9
- Ice class: 1C
- Speed: 15 knots (28 km/h; 17 mph)
- Capacity: 532 passengers, 264 cabins

MS Midnatsol (formerly MS Maud between 2021–2024) is a Hurtigruten vessel built by Bruces Verkstad in Sweden and Fosen Mekaniske Verksteder in Rissa Municipality, Norway in 2001. It is the fourth ship to sail for Hurtigruten to bear this name. She has a sister ship, MS Trollfjord, which also sails for Hurtigruten. Midnatsol was renamed Maud between 2021 and 2024.

== History ==
At 04:00 on the night of 14 December 2003, the ship was on a southbound course between Ålesund and Måløy when the main power supply failed and Midnatsol lost all engine power. The ship was approaching a reef and the anchors were set out in an attempt to stop the drift, but the attempt failed. All 102 passengers were ordered to the lifeboats after an attempt to connect a towing hawser from another vessel also failed. The situation was very critical and Midnatsol sent a Mayday message. The ship was only 150 metres (490 ft) from shore when one of the anchors finally caught. Not long after, the crew managed to restart the main engines and the ship went on to Florø. The cause of the engine stoppage was an overgrown inlet to the engine's coolant systems.

In August 2004, the Norwegian Broadcasting Corporation filmed aboard Midnatsol for the series Hurtigruten 365. The recordings took place in one year, and the result was 20 episodes that were shown on television.

On 6 June 2015, the vessel caught fire off Vardo in Southern Norway. The fire started in one of the service rooms. The crew reacted immediately, extinguishing the fire in less than an hour. No injuries or damages were reported.

In December 2023, the ship was caught in a severe storm in the North Sea, resulting in damage from a rogue wave. The wave broke the bridge windows, flooded the bridge, and caused a temporary loss of power, leaving the ship without navigational systems and radar, necessitating manual steering from the engine room. The crew and the 266 passengers aboard were safe, and a towage vessel assisted Maud in maintaining stability. The Maud was approximately 350 kilometres (220 mi) east of the UK and 260 kilometres (160 mi) west of Denmark at the time of the incident, heading for the port of Tilbury after departing from Norway. Despite the severe conditions, including hurricane-force winds, the Danish authorities confirmed that the situation was stable and the ship was in no immediate danger.
