= Ofotens og Vesteraalens Dampskibsselskab =

Norwegian ferry transport company

Ofotens og Vesteraalens Dampskibsselskab ASA
- Industry: Shipping
- Founded: 1987
- Defunct: 2006
- Fate: Merger
- Successor: Hurtigruten
- Headquarters: Narvik, Norway
- Products: Hurtigruten
- Number of employees: 1,500

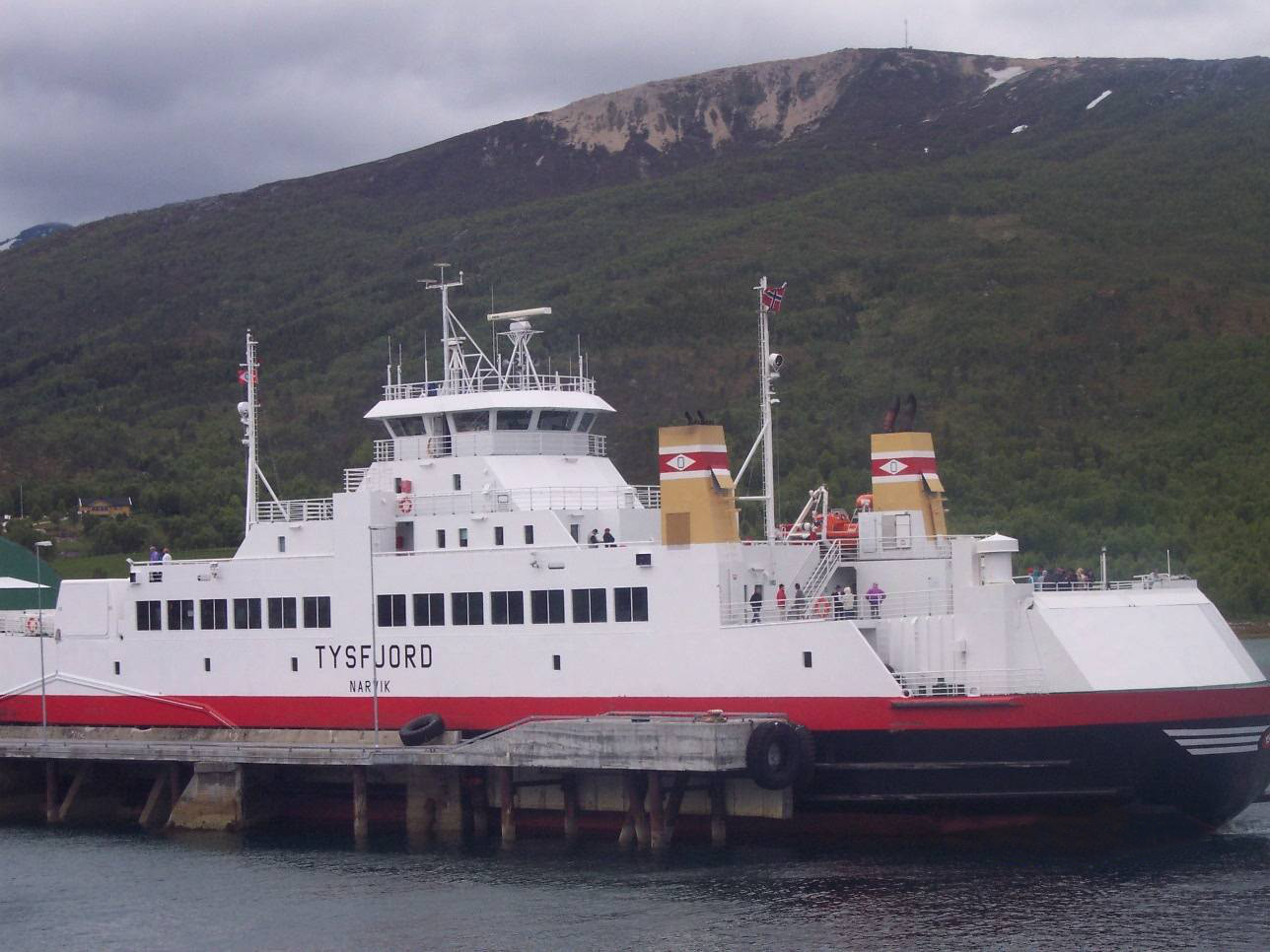
The car ferry Tysfjord operated by OVDS

Ofotens og Vesteraalens Dampskibsselskab or OVDS was a Norwegian shipping company that operated ferries in Northern Norway, including the Coastal Express, car ferries and passenger ferries.

OVDS's main office was in Narvik while the ferry section was located in Stokmarknes. The company had about 1,500 employees at the time of the merger and operated 14 coastal expresses, 18 car ferries and 14 passenger ferries. OVDS was created as a merger in 1987 between the two shipping companies Vesteraalens Dampskibsselskab (VDS, established in 1881) and Ofotens Dampskibsselskab (ODS, established in 1912).

The company merged with Troms Fylkes Dampskibsselskap in 2006 to form Hurtigruten Group.
