= Troms Fylkes Dampskibsselskap =

Norwegian shipping company

Troms Fylkes Dampskibsselskap ASA
- Industry: Shipping
- Founded: 1866
- Defunct: 2006
- Fate: Merger
- Successor: Hurtigruten
- Headquarters: Tromsø, Norway
- Products: Hurtigruten
- Number of employees: 2,000
- Subsidiaries: TIRB

Troms Fylkes Dampskibsselskap or TFDS is a defunct Norwegian shipping company that also has activities in public transport and tourism. Based in Tromsø the company was one of the two operators of the Coastal Express and also operated a number of car ferries and passenger ferries, primarily in Troms. It also operated three supply ships and some other vessels as of 2006. In 2004 TFDS had bought the bus company TIRB.

The company dates back to 1866 and has had a number of activities within shipping. It was listed on the Oslo Stock Exchange until 2006 when it merged with Ofotens og Vesteraalens Dampskibsselskab to create Hurtigruten Group. At the time of the merger the group had 38 ships, 123 buses and 86 trucks.
