= Stokmarknes =

Town in Hadsel, Norway

Stokmarknes: Stokmarknes (Norwegian); Njárga (Northern Sami)
- Town/City
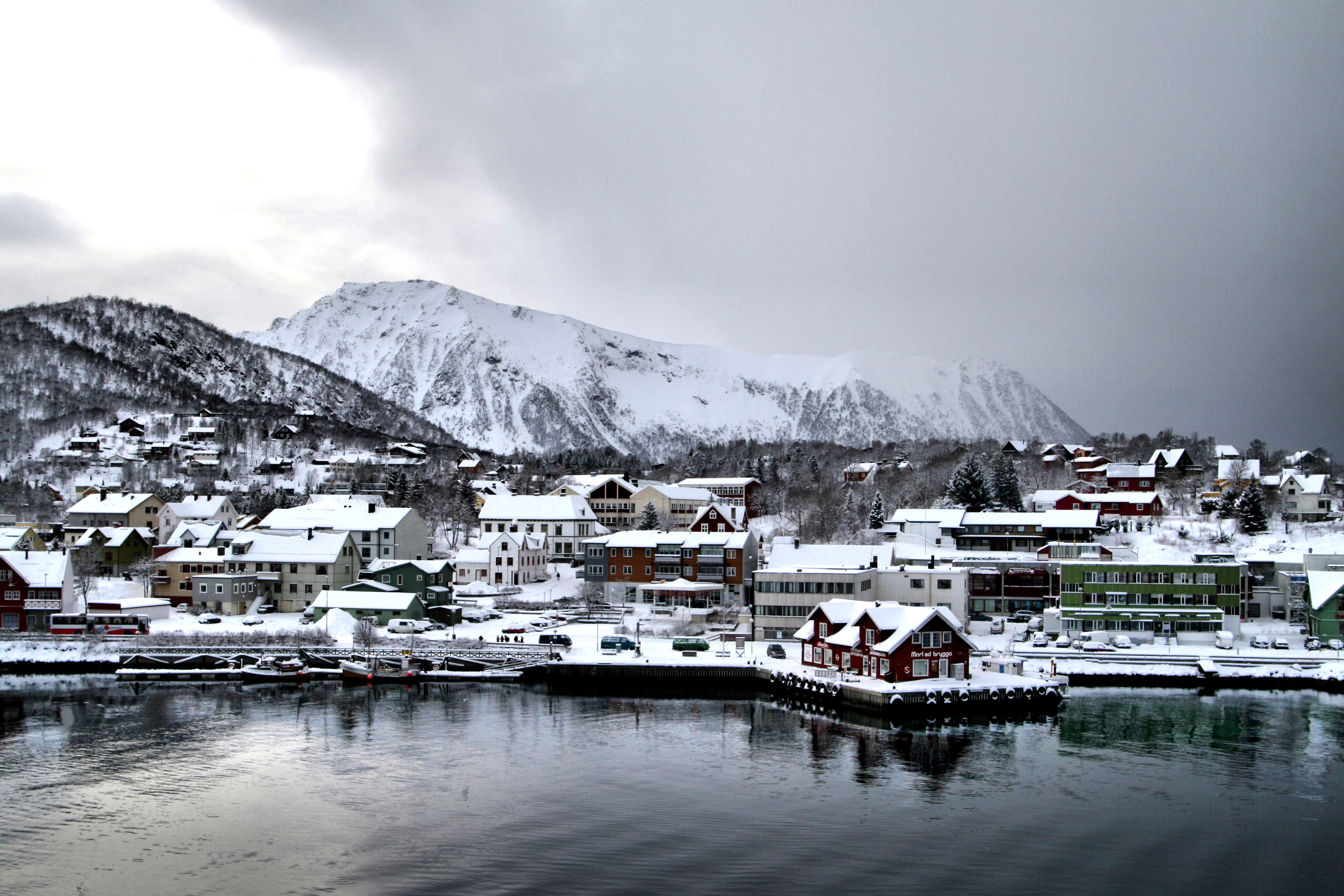
- View of the town in winter
- Interactive map of Stokmarknes
- Location within Nordland Location within Norway
- Coordinates: 68.5656°N 14.9044°E
- Country: Norway
- Region: Northern Norway
- County: Nordland
- District: Vesterålen
- Municipality: Hadsel Municipality
- Established as
- Town (By): 2000

Area
  - Total: 2.57 km^{2} (0.99 sq mi)
- Elevation: 18 m (59 ft)

Population (2023)
  - Total: 3,496
  - Density: 1,360/km^{2} (3,500/sq mi)
- Time zone: UTC+01:00 (CET)
  - Summer (DST): UTC+02:00 (CEST)
- Post Code: 8450 Stokmarknes

Stokmarknes (Norwegian) or Njárga (Northern Sami) is a town and the administrative centre of Hadsel Municipality in Nordland county, Norway. It is located on the northern coast of the island of Hadseløya and on the small, neighboring island of Børøya. The 2.57-square-kilometre (640-acre) town has a population (2023) of 3,496 and a population density of 1,360 inhabitants per square kilometre (3,500/sq mi). In 2000, Stokmarknes received "town status".

Stokmarknes is the headquarters to the Hurtigruten coastal express company and also the Coastal Express Museum. The local hospital for the whole Vesterålen region (Nordland Hospital Vesterålen) is located in the town as well. Stokmarknes is the home town of Norwegian band Madrugada. The historic Hadsel Church is located about 5 kilometres (3.1 mi) east of Stokmarknes.

The Børøy Bridge and Hadsel Bridge connect Stokmarknes to the islands of Børøya and Langøya to the north. Stokmarknes Airport, Skagen is located on Langøya, just over the bridges from Stokmarknes.

== Media gallery ==
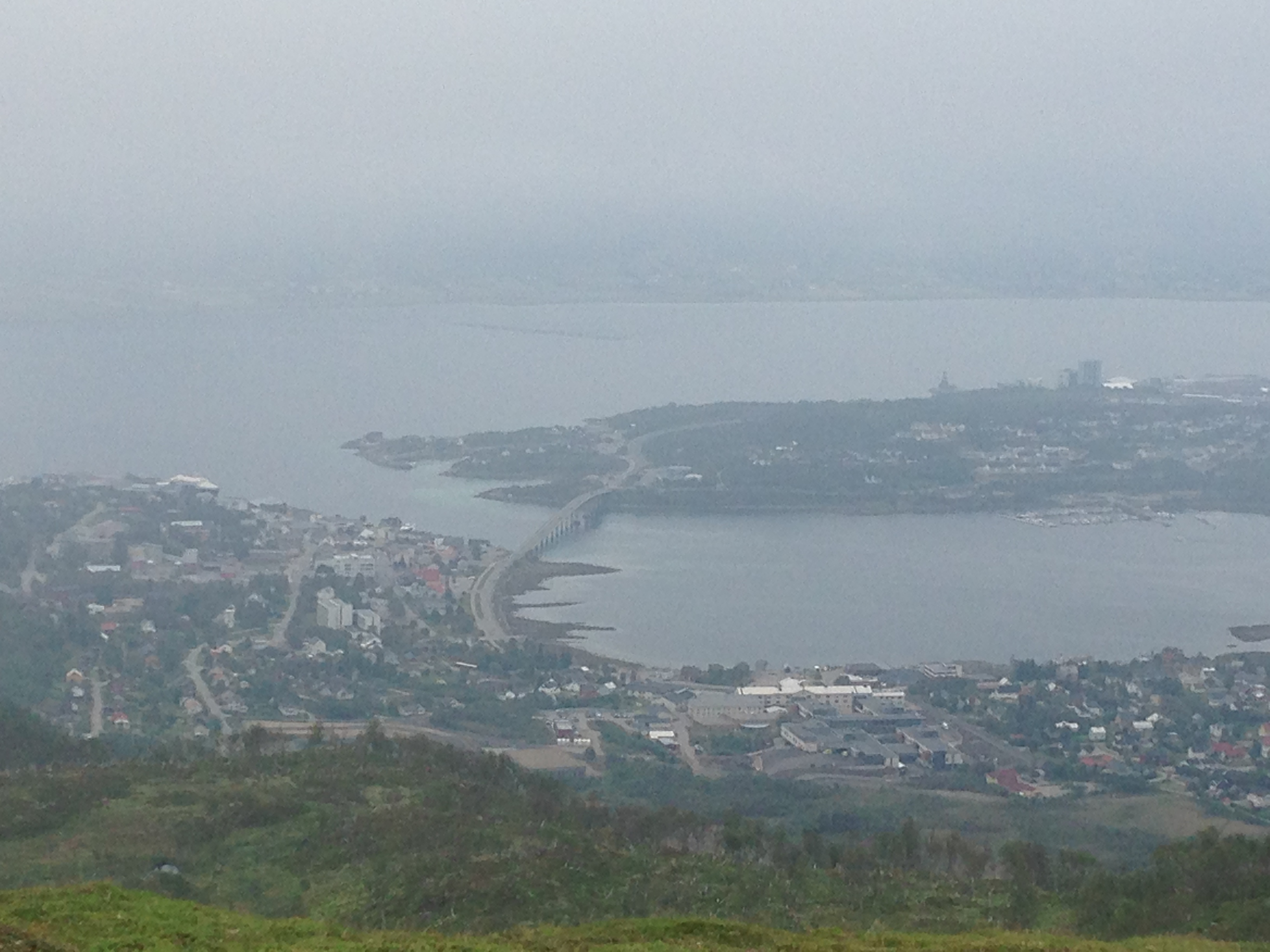
View of the town

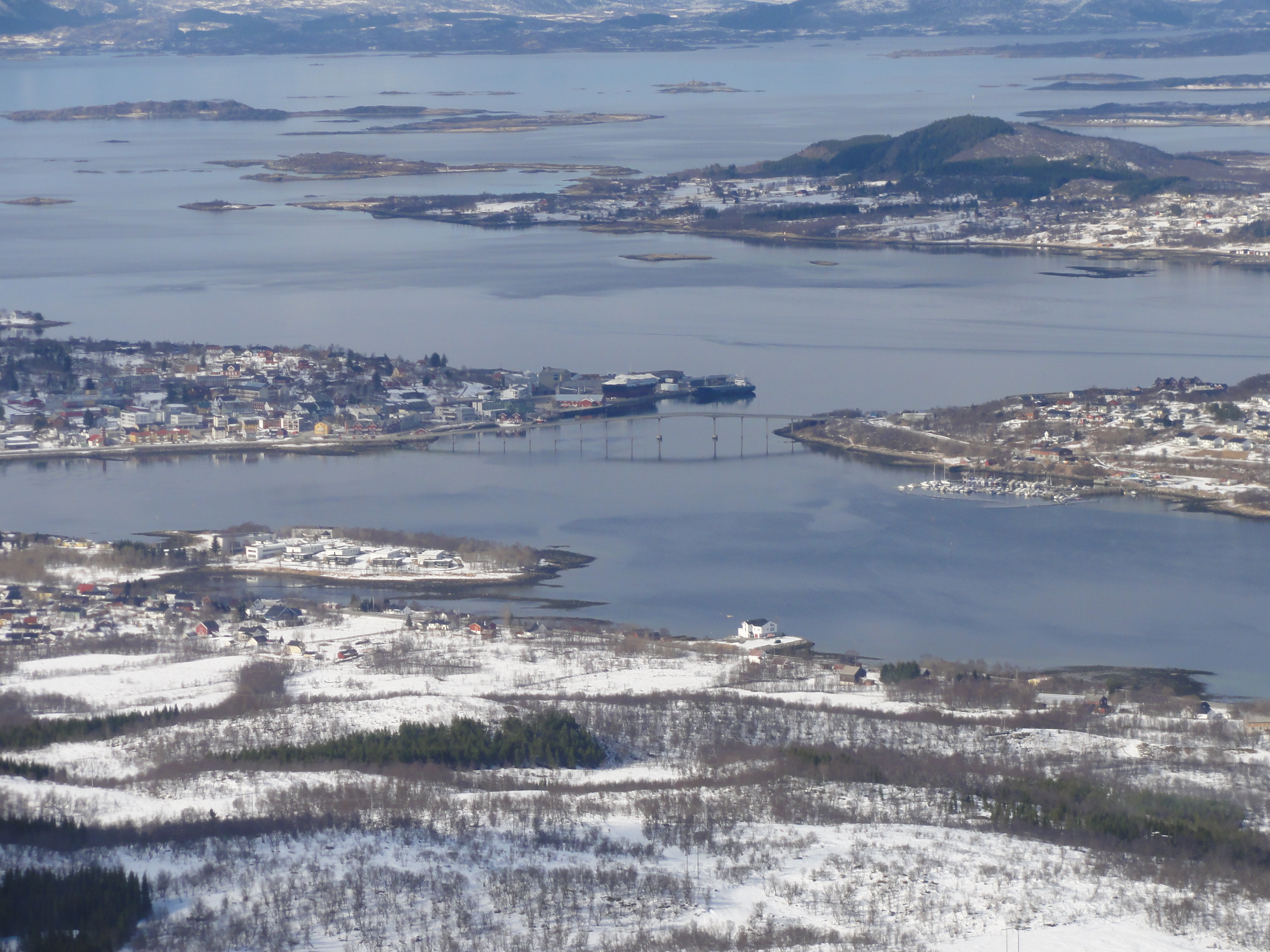
Aerial view of the town

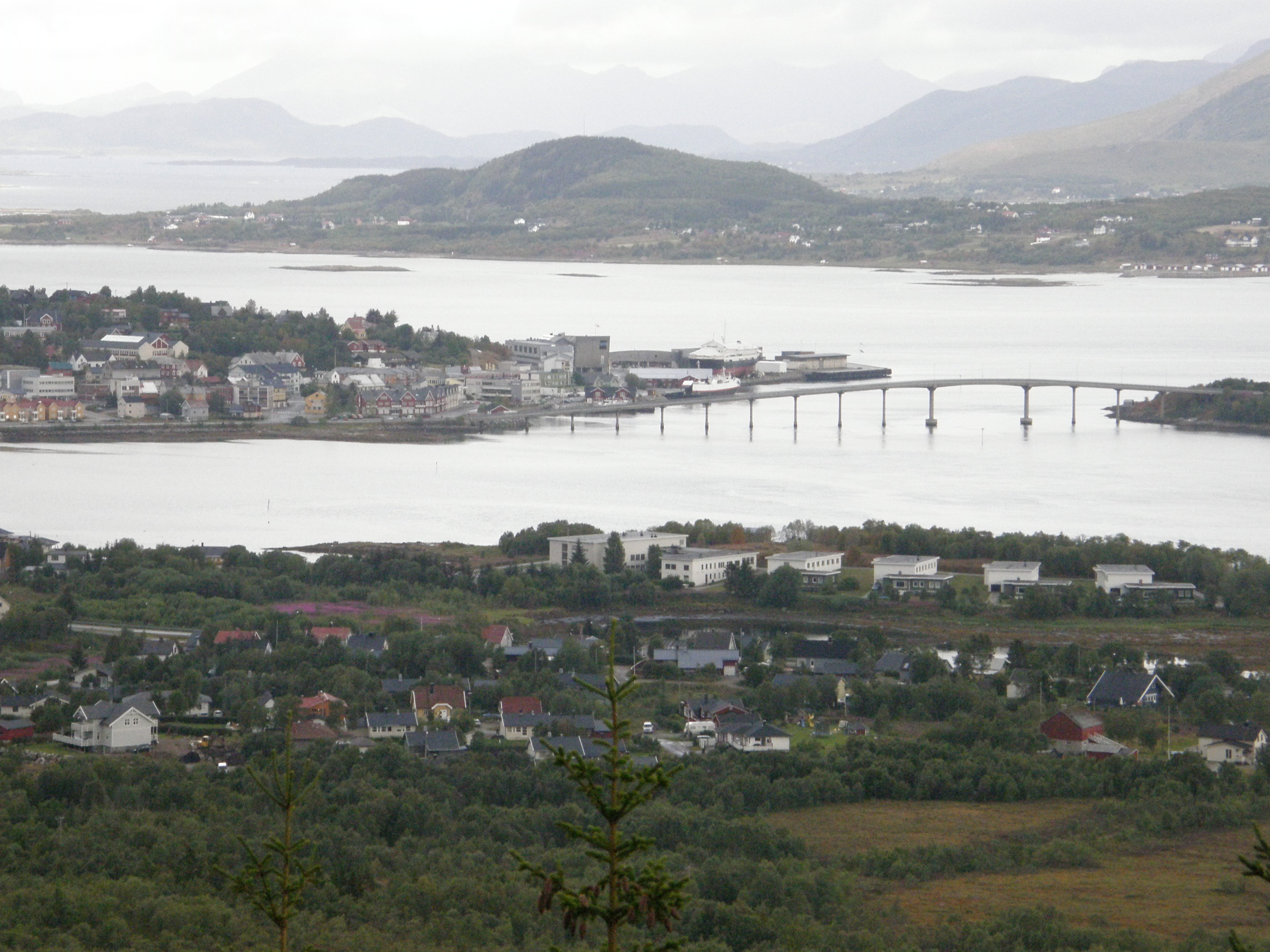
Another view of the town

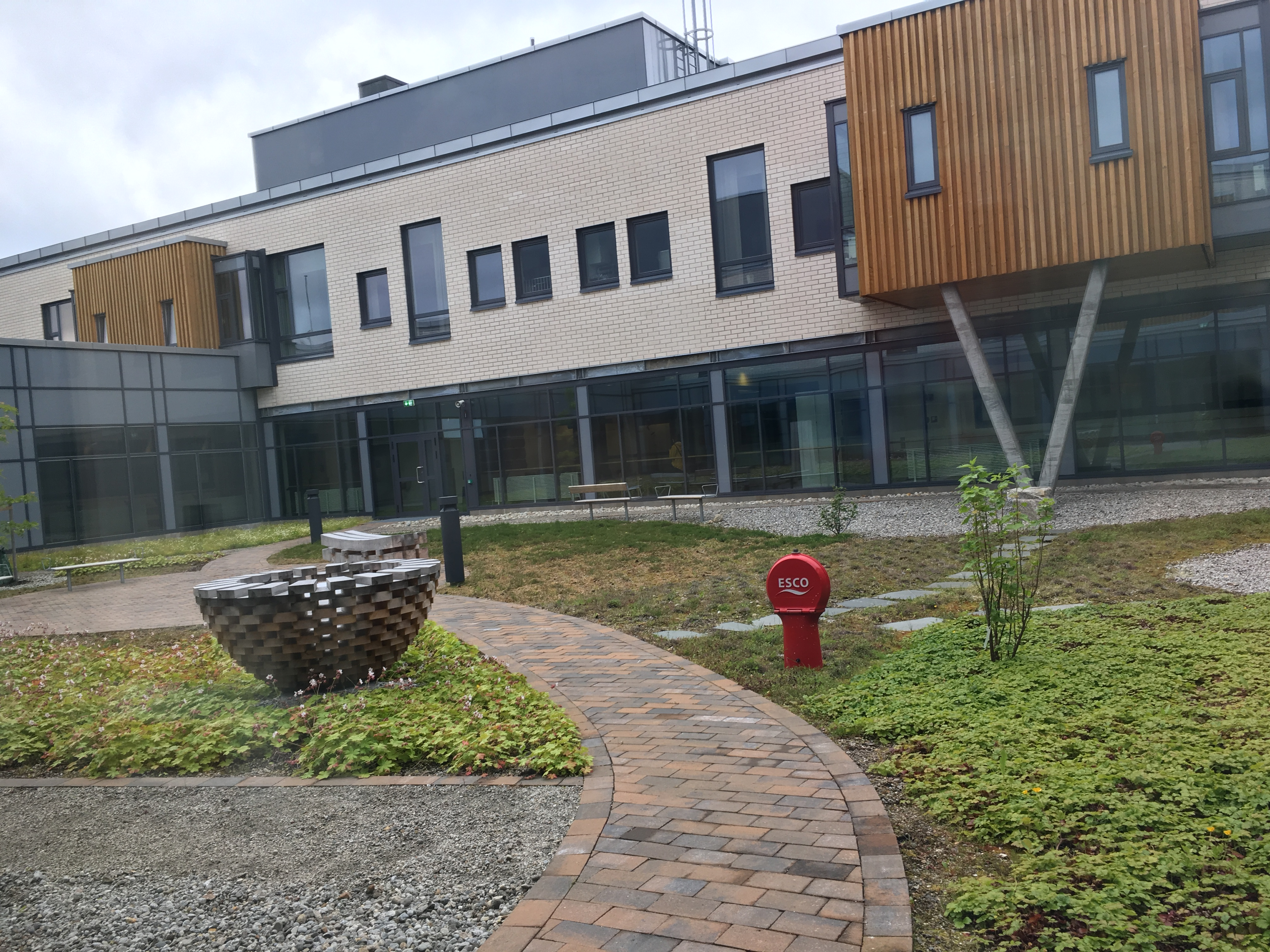
Local hospital

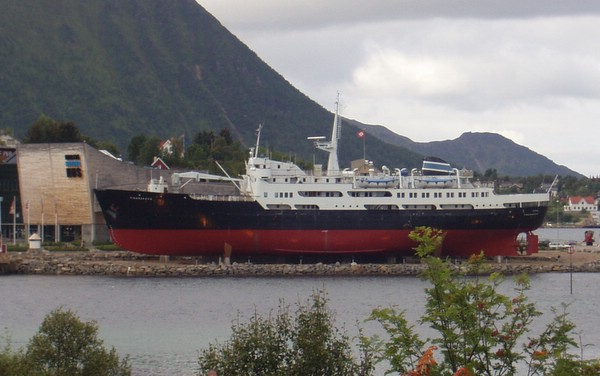
View of the Coastal Express Museum with the museum ship MS Finnmarken

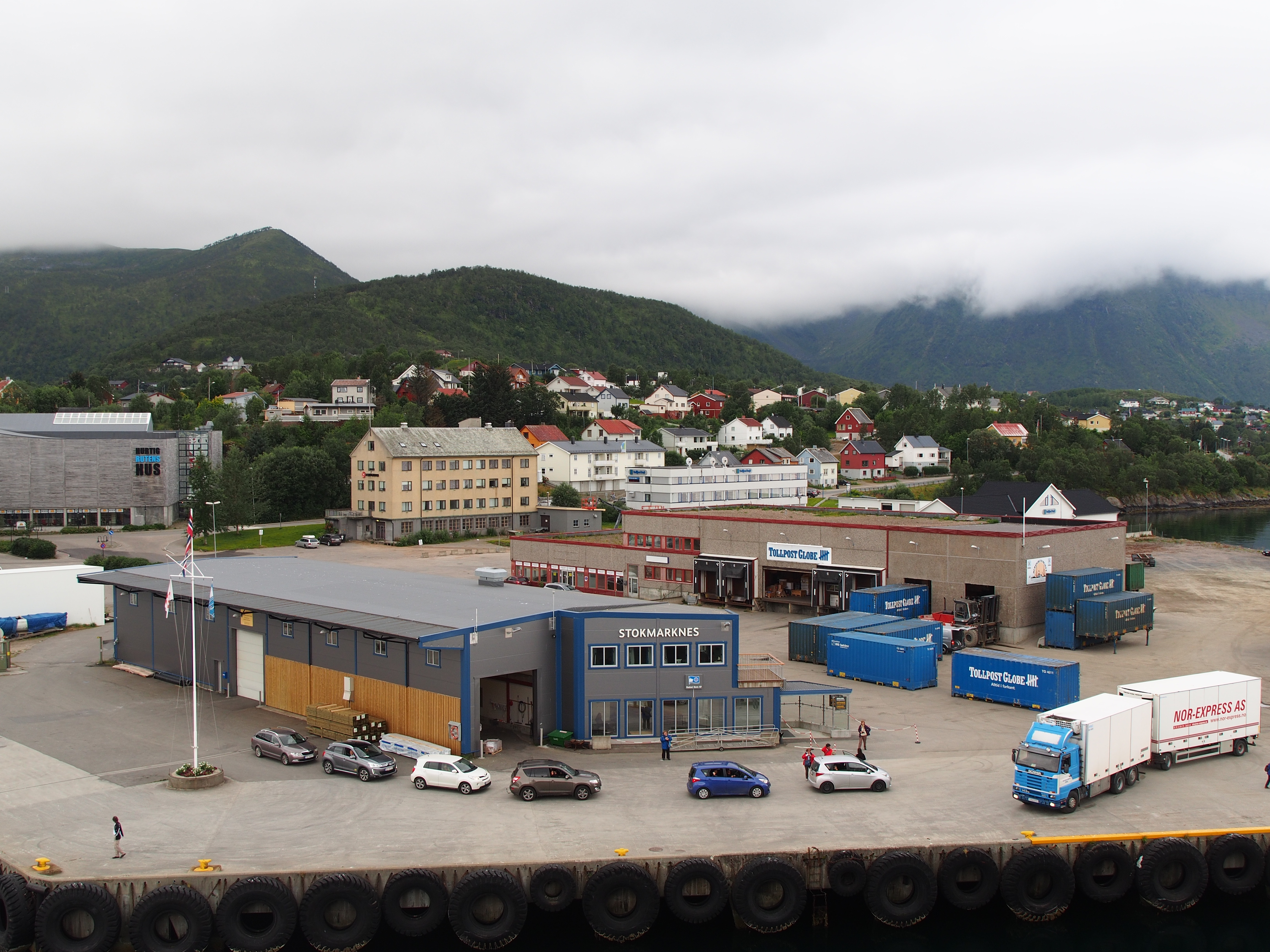
Port of Stokmarknes

== See also ==
- List of towns and cities in Norway
