= Leinøya =

Island in Møre og Romsdal, Norway

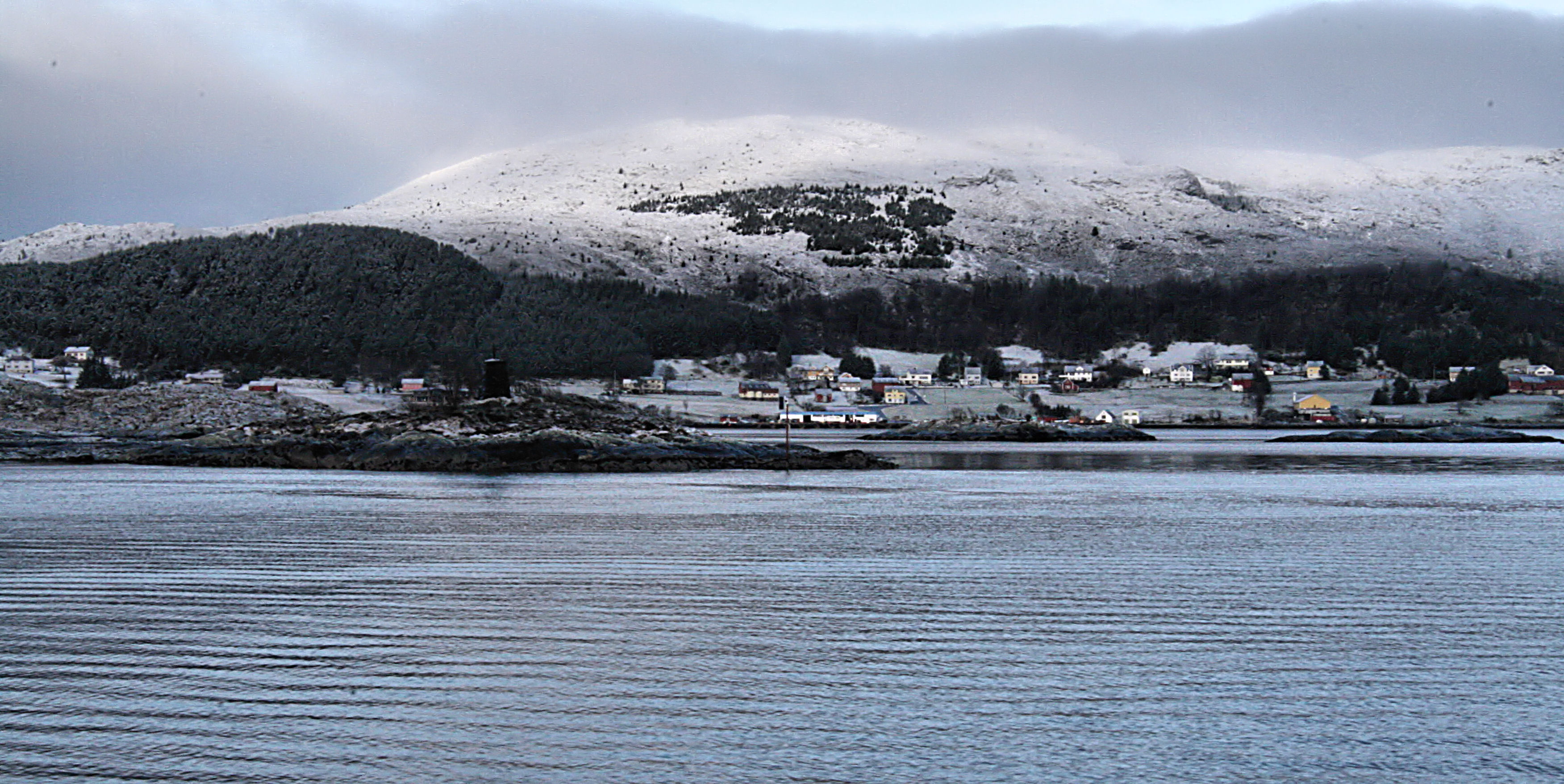
- View of Torvik on the east coast of the island.
- Interactive map of Leinøya

Geography
- Location: Møre og Romsdal, Norway
- Coordinates: 62.3380°N 5.7015°E
- Area: 14.4 km^{2} (5.6 sq mi)
- Length: 5 km (3.1 mi)
- Width: 4 km (2.5 mi)
- Highest elevation: 364 m (1194 ft)
- Highest point: Leinehornet

Administration
- Norway
- County: Møre og Romsdal
- Municipality: Herøy Municipality

Demographics
- Population: 1479 (2015)

Leinøya is an island in Herøy Municipality in Møre og Romsdal county, Norway. Its original name was Bølandet, but Leinøya is now the official name. The island is located east of the town of Fosnavåg on the nearby island of Bergsøya. The island is connected to several surrounding islands via a network of bridges. The Remøy Bridge connects it to the island Remøya (to the north), the Herøy Bridge connects it to Nautøya and Gurskøya (to the south), and a small bridge connects to the island of Bergsøya (to the west).

The highest point on the island is Leinehornet which is 363 metres (1,191 ft) above sea level. The island has an area of 14.4 square kilometres (5.6 sq mi). The village of Torvik, on the east side of the island, is a stop on the Hurtigruten. In 2015, the island had 1,479 residents.

== See also ==
- List of islands of Norway
