= Havila Kystruten =

Norwegian shipping company

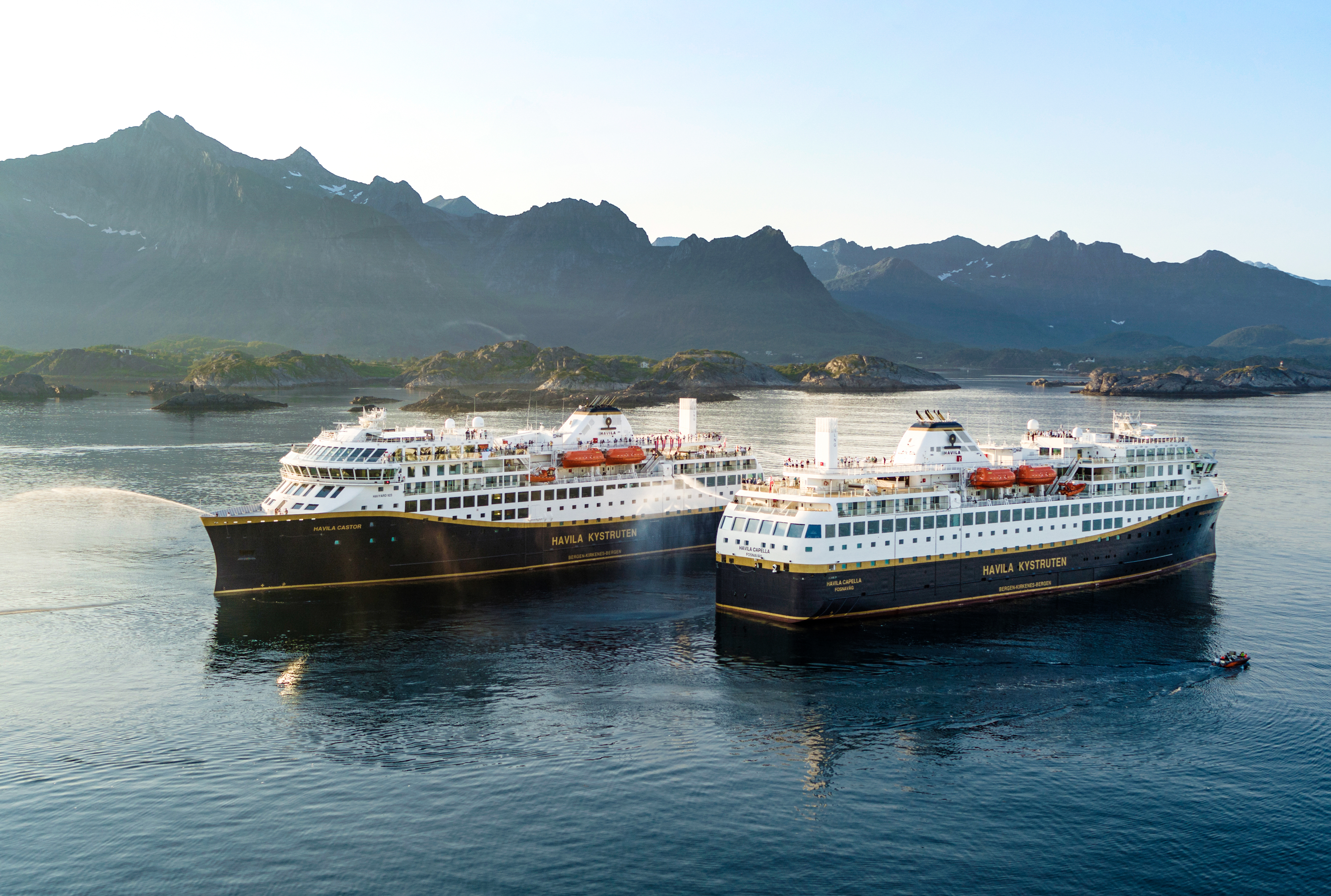
- Company type: Shipping company
- Traded as: Euronext Growth
- Industry: Transport
- Founded: November 13th, 2017 in Fosnavåg, Norway.
- Headquarters: Fosnavåg, Norway, Norway
- Products: Ferry transport Freight shipping Cruise line
- Parent: Havila Holding AS
- Website: Havila Kystruten AS (in English)

Havila Kystruten AS (known as Havila Voyages internationally) is a Norwegian shipping company that operates 4 out of 11 ships on the coastal route Bergen-Kirkenes-Bergen (commonly known as Hurtigruten). The company is listed on Euronext Growth Oslo, and the largest shareholder is Havila Holding AS from Fosnavåg. The CEO is Bent Martini.

== Ships ==
The company has 4 identical sister ships in operation along the coastal route, MS Havila Capella, MS Havila Castor, MS Havila Polaris, and MS Havila Pollux. The ships have a length of 124 meters and a width of 22 meters. Loading capacity is five cars and 190 pallets, where 40 of the pallets can be transported with cooling or freezing. Unlike its competitor on the route, Havila's ships are not equipped to load and unload cars in the ports along the route; Havila also refuses to carry electric or hybrid cars. The ships have a crew of 76 and cabin capacity for 468 passengers, as well as room for 172 day travelers.

The ships were designed by Havyard and have the designation Hav 923. Rolls-Royce has supplied a propulsion system, based on LNG and a 6.1 MWh battery, the largest battery pack installed on a passenger vessel to date.

Havila Capella and Havila Castor were contracted for construction at the Tersan shipyard in Turkey, while Havila Polaris and Havila Pollux were contracted at Hijos de J. Barreras (Astillero Barreras) shipyard in Spain. However, the Spanish shipyard ended up in financial trouble, which led to the cancellation of the contracts. New contracts were signed at Tersan, and the partially completed Havila Polaris and Havila Pollux were towed to Tersan, which completed the build of all four vessels.

Havila Capella was delivered and put into service December 12, 2021. GTLK Asia, through which Havila Capella and the other vessels were financed was hit by sanctions in April 2022, which led to the ship being docked in Bergen until the end of June 2022, when Havila Kystruten was upheld in a ruling from the Hordaland district court. Havila Castor was delivered on April 22, 2022, and put into service on May, 10th 2022.

After a complex legal process, Havila Voyages received a license from the Central Bank of Ireland allowing the company to refinance Havila Polaris and Havila Pollux on July 28, 2023, removing their dependence on the frozen accounts of GTLK Asia. The ships were delivered to Havila Voyages on August 1, 2023. Havila Polaris departed from Tersan Shipyards on August 1, 2023, arriving in Bergen on August 15 and picking up its first passengers in Bodø on August 18. Havila Pollux departed from Tersan one day later, arriving in Bergen on August 17 and starting its first regular round trip on August 23
