= Leikanger Church (Herøy) =

Church in Møre og Romsdal, Norway

- Leikanger kyrkje
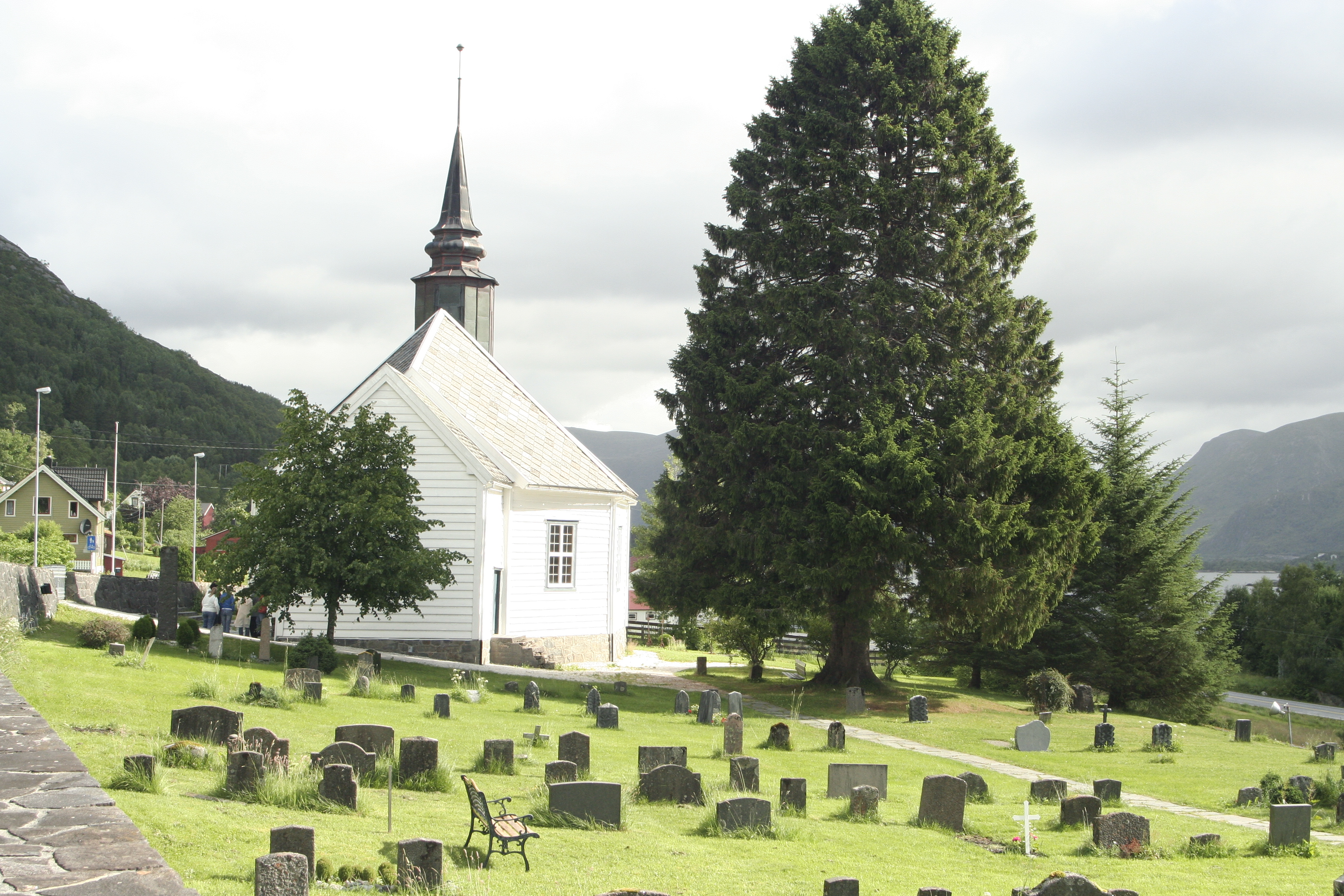
- View of the church
- Leikanger Church
- 62°14′58″N 5°46′54″E
- Location: Herøy, Møre og Romsdal
- Country: Norway
- Denomination: Church of Norway
- Churchmanship: Evangelical Lutheran

History
- Status: Parish church
- Founded: 1872
- Consecrated: 26 January 1873
- Events: 1872: Moved to Leikong

Architecture
- Functional status: Active
- Architectural type: Octagonal
- Completed: 1806 (220 years ago)

Specifications
- Capacity: 380
- Materials: Wood

Administration
- Diocese: Møre bispedømme
- Deanery: Søre Sunnmøre prosti
- Parish: Leikanger
- Norwegian Cultural Heritage Site
- Type: Church
- Status: Automatically protected
- ID: 84923

Leikanger Church (Norwegian: Leikanger kyrkje) is a parish church of the Church of Norway in Herøy Municipality in Møre og Romsdal county, Norway. It is located in the village of Leikong on the eastern coast of the island of Gurskøya. It is the church for the Leikanger parish which is part of the Søre Sunnmøre prosti (deanery) in the Diocese of Møre. The white, wooden church was built in an octagonal style in 1806 by an unknown architect and it was disassembled and moved to this site in 1872. The church seats about 380 people.

== History ==
A royal decree that was issued in 1872, gave permission to establish a church in Leikong. Rather than building a new church, the parish found that a nearby parish was selling the old Ørskog Church because it was too small for their parish. The old church was originally built in 1806 in Sjøholt by the builder Elling Olsson Walbøe. So, in 1872, it was purchased and then disassembled and shipped to Leikong where it was rebuilt. The newly rebuilt church was named Leikanger Church and it was consecrated on 26 January 1873. The church was rebuilt just like before except that the tower which was originally above the nave, was rebuilt above the church porch. In 1960, the church was restored and refurbished. During this renovation, the tower was moved back from the porch to the central part of the roof over the nave.

== Pictures ==
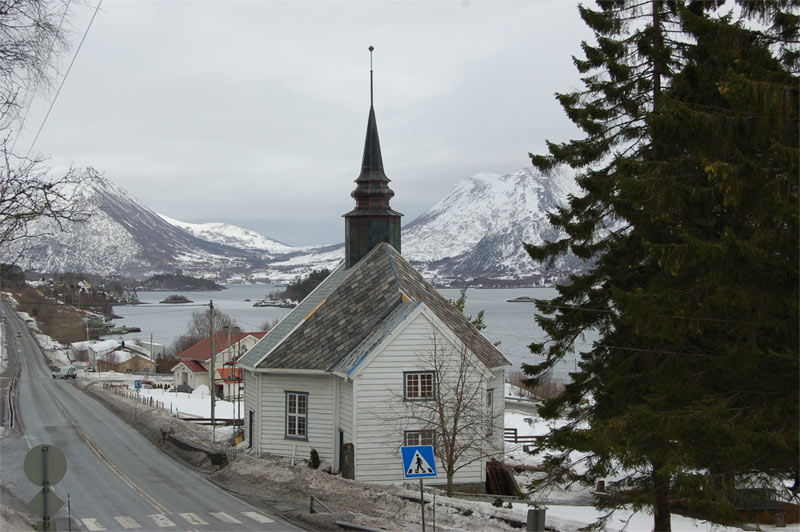
Exterior in winter

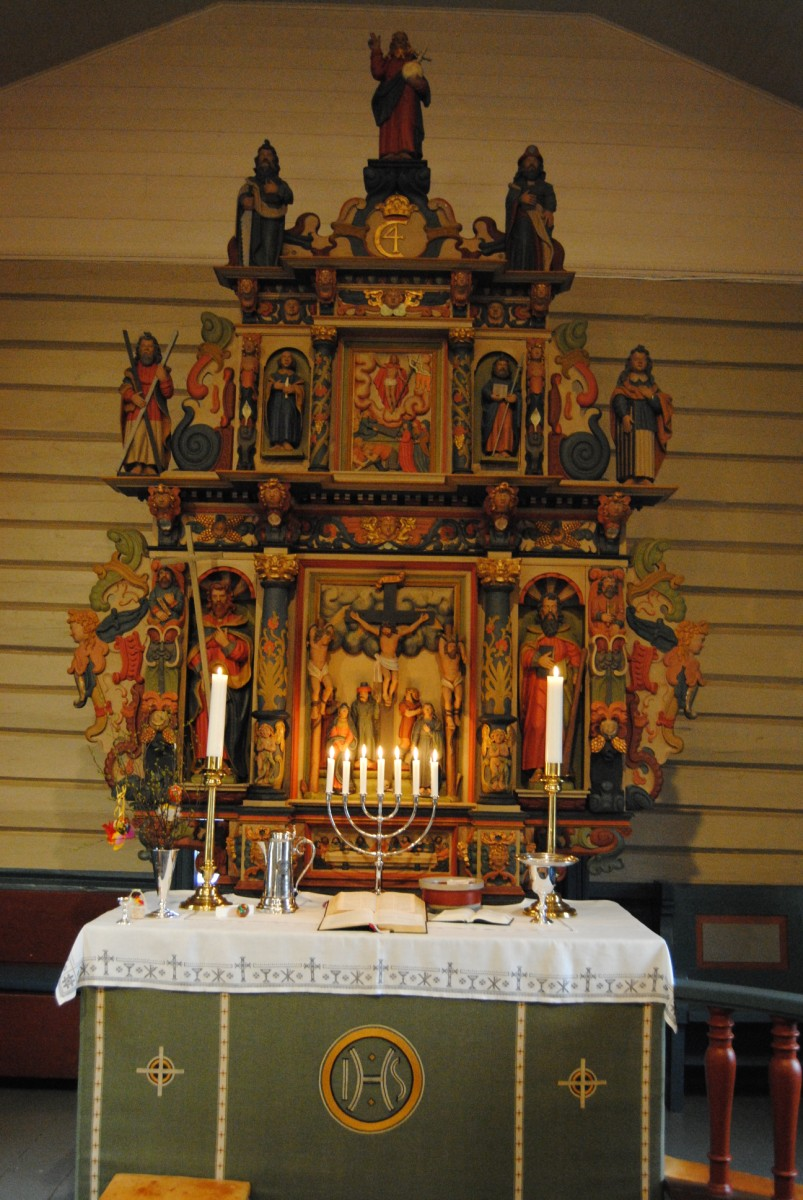
Altar

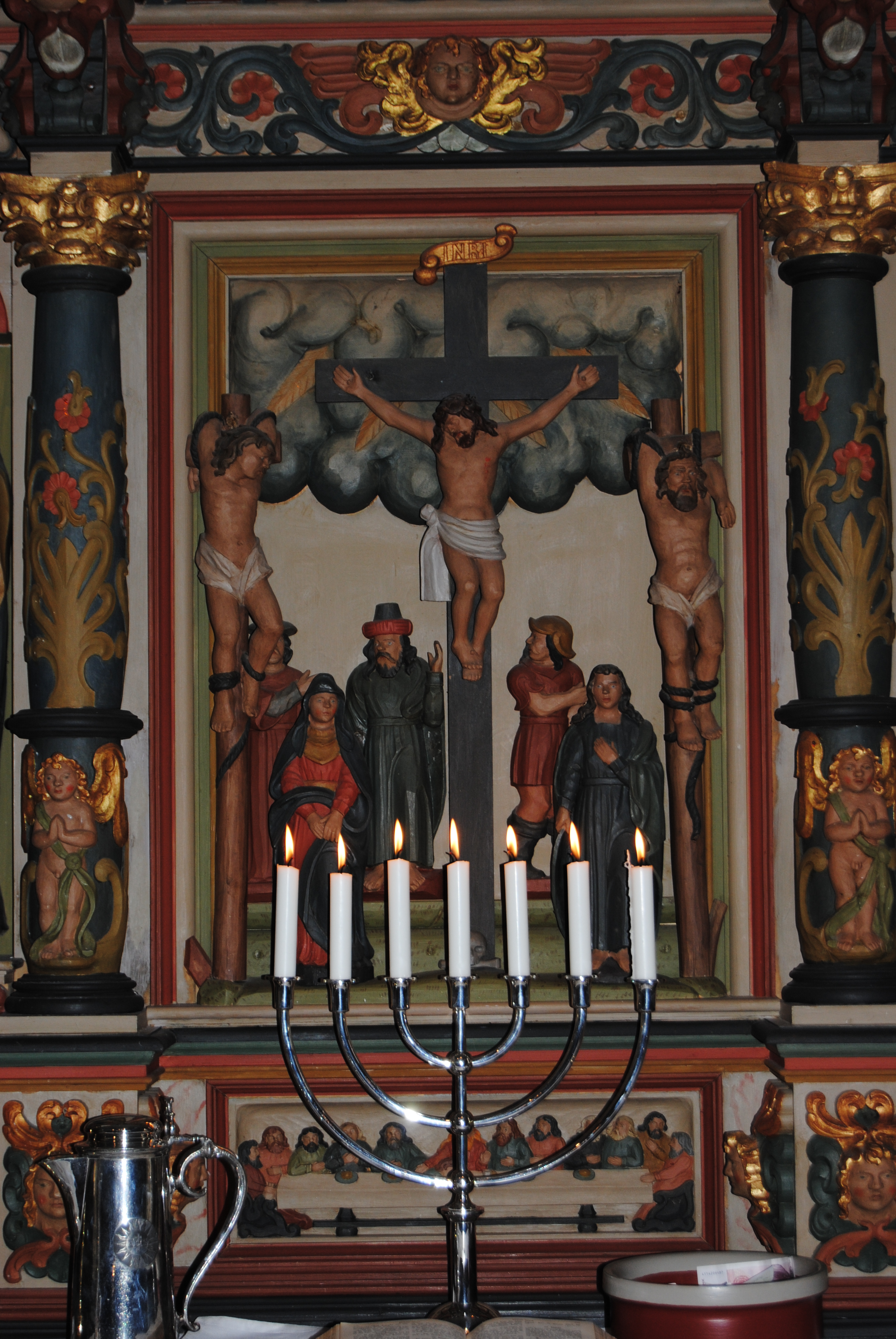
Altar

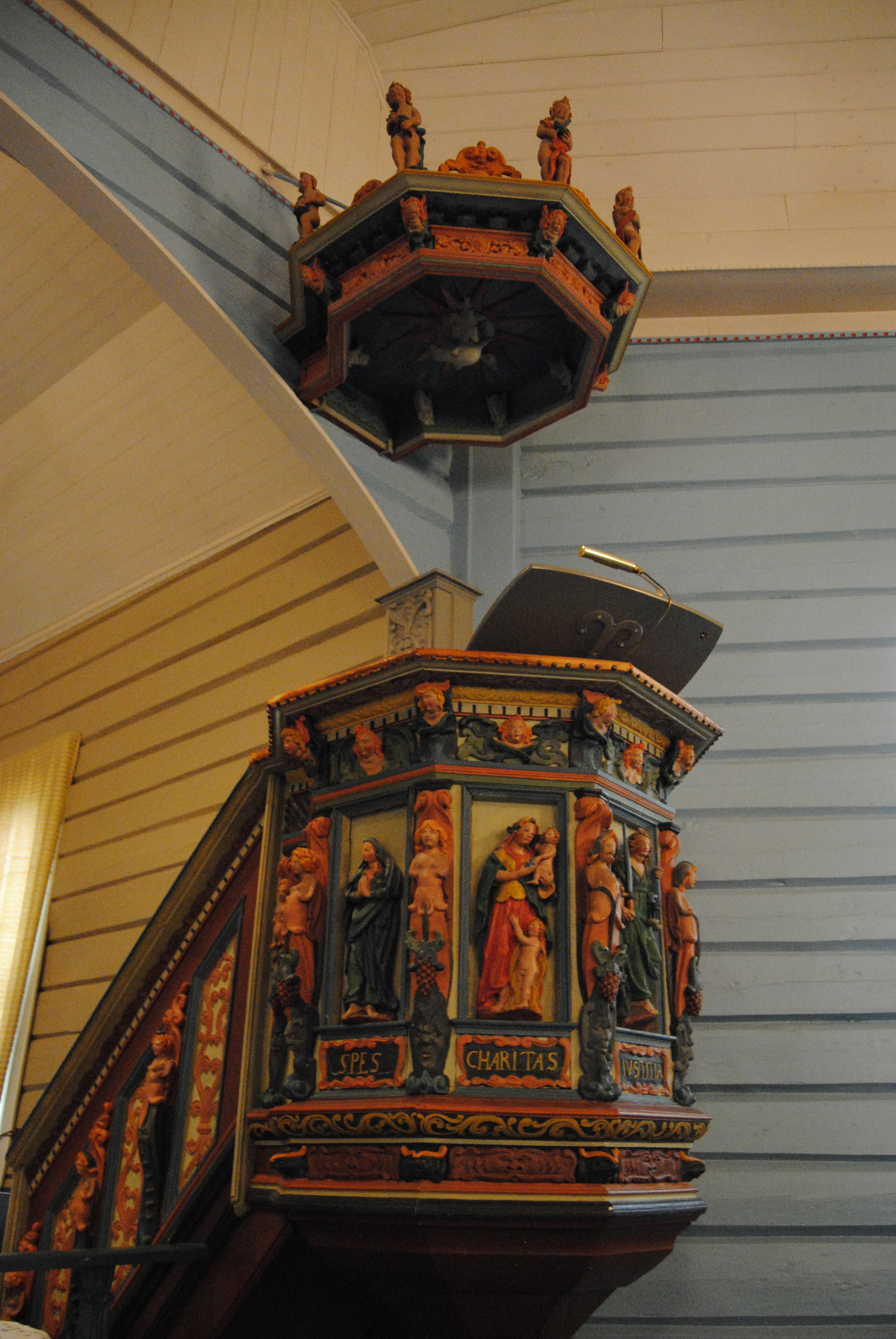
Pulpit decorated with the seven virtues.

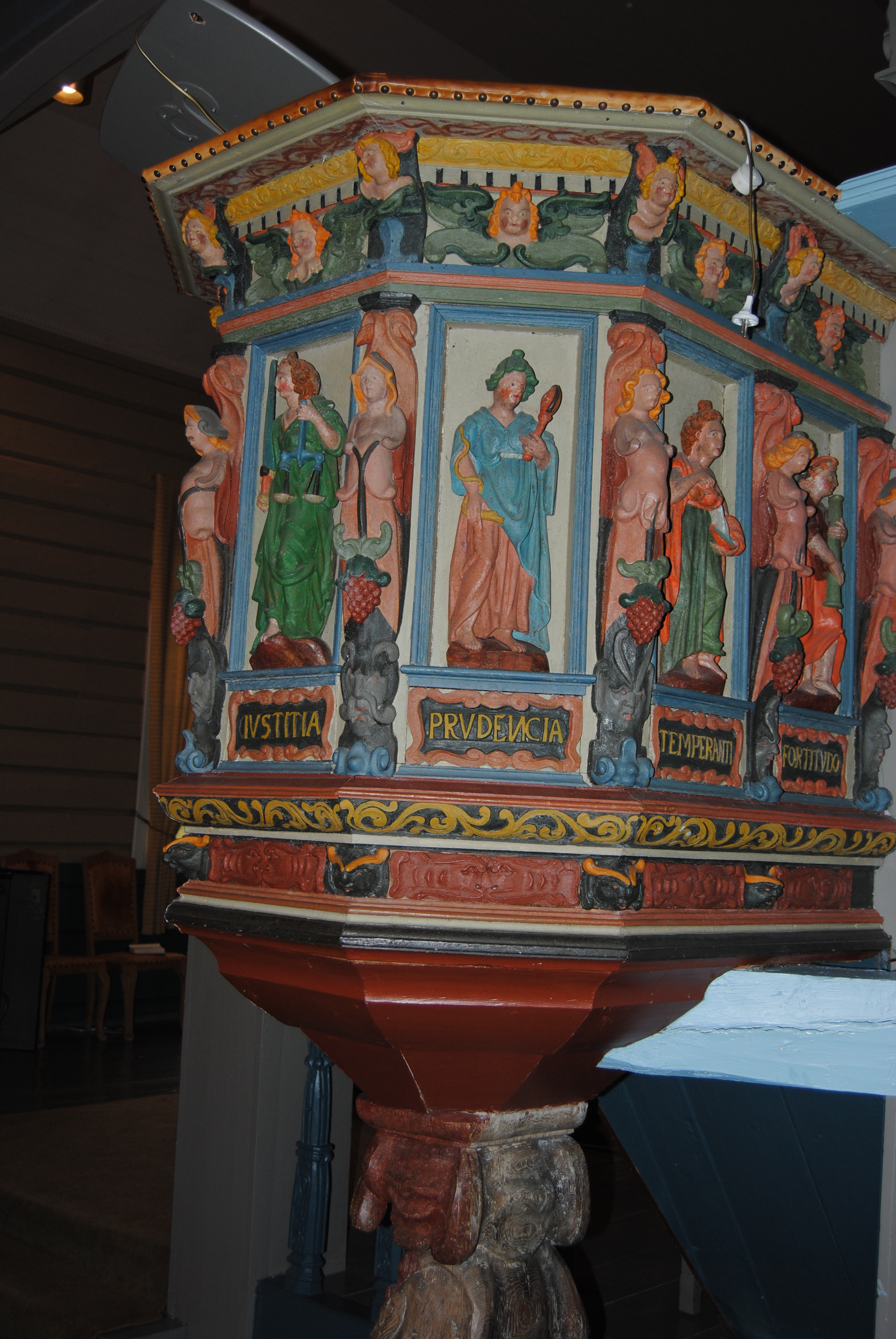
Pulpit details

== See also ==
- List of churches in Møre
