= Remøya =

Island in Møre og Romsdal, Norway

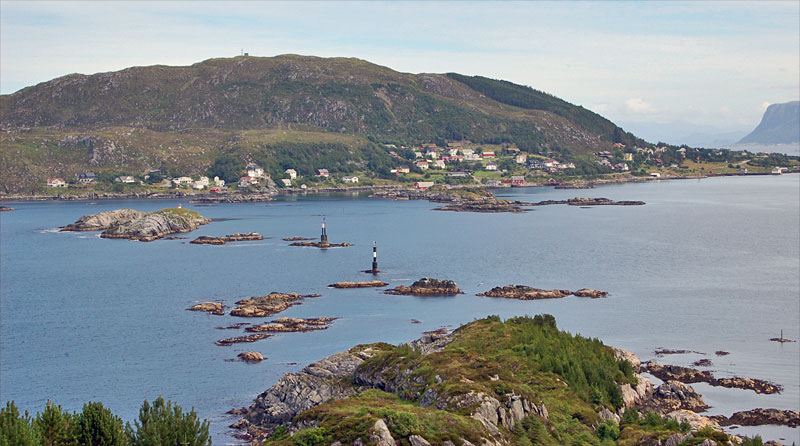
- View of the island
- Interactive map of Remøya

Geography
- Location: Møre og Romsdal, Norway
- Coordinates: 62.3683°N 5.6397°E
- Area: 3.6 km^{2} (1.4 sq mi)
- Highest elevation: 191 m (627 ft)
- Highest point: Vardan

Administration
- Norway
- County: Møre og Romsdal
- Municipality: Herøy Municipality

Demographics
- Population: 347 (2023)

Remøya is an island in Herøy Municipality in Møre og Romsdal county, Norway. The island is located north of the municipal center of Fosnavåg. The 3.6-square-kilometre (1.4 sq mi) island is connected to other islands via a network of bridges. The Remøy Bridge connects it to the island Leinøya (to the south) and the Runde Bridge connects it to the island of Runde (to the north). The highest point on the island is Vardan which is 191 metres (627 ft) above sea level. Virtually all of the island's residents live on the southern portion of the island in the 0.41-square-kilometre (100-acre) village area called Remøy. The island had a population of 347 in 2023.

== See also ==
- List of islands of Norway
