= Synnøve Eriksen =

Norwegian novelist (born 1963)

Synnøve Eriksen (born 27 February 1963 in Herøy Municipality) is a Norwegian novelist. She now lives in Oslo and has written the Bergfoss series (20 books). Her books have been translated to English as The Bergfoss Saga.
