= Per Rolf Sævik =

Norwegian politician

Per Rolf Sævik (born 15 December 1940) is a Norwegian fisher, ship-owner and politician for the Christian Democratic Party.

He was born in Herøy Municipality as a son of fisher Arthur Sævik (1910–1976) and housewife Magda Steinsvik (1915–2003). He worked as a fisher since 1955. In 1981 he returned to land as manager of Sævik Supply I and Sævik Supply II. Between 1993 and 2006 he was the chief executive of Sævik Supply Management I, Sævik Supply, Havila Supply, Havtank and Havyard. After 2006 he served as chairman of Havyard.

He was a member of the municipal council for Herøy Municipality from 1971 to 1979 and 1983 to 1989, serving as mayor of Herøy Municipality from 1987 to 1989. He served as a deputy representative to the Parliament of Norway in the periods 1977–1981, 1981–1985 and 1985–1989. He was then elected in 1989 from Møre og Romsdal, and served through one term. For his first year he was a member of the Standing Committee on Defence. He then switched to the Standing Committee on Local Government and the Environment and the Standing Committee on Scrutiny. In the latter he served as deputy chair from 1990 to 1993.

He chaired Søre Sunnmøre Kraftlag from 1989 to 1995 (board member since 1987), Kredittbanken from 1993 to 1999, the Central Norway Regional Health Authority from 2004 to 2006 and the Maritime Forum of Norway, and was a deputy board member of the Norwegian Petroleum Directorate from 1985 to 1990. In the fishing industry he chaired Sunnmøre Notfiskarlag from 1972 to 1975 (board member since 1970), the Norwegian Fishing Vessel Owners Association from 1979 to 1983 (board member since 1977) and was a national board member of the Norges Fiskarlag 1980 to 1982. In the Norwegian Shipowners' Association he was a board member from 1988 to 1989 and president from 1996 to 1998.

He was also active in the inner mission and Blue Cross. In 2012 he was decorated as a Knight, First Class of the Order of St. Olav.

Business positions
Preceded by Westye Høegh	President of the Norwegian Shipowners' Association; 1996–1998	Succeeded by Bjørn Sjaastad
Civic offices
Preceded by Lars Peder Brekk	Chair of the Central Norway Regional Health Authority; 2004–2006	Succeeded by Kolbjørn Almlid
