= Hurtigruten =

Norwegian public coastal route

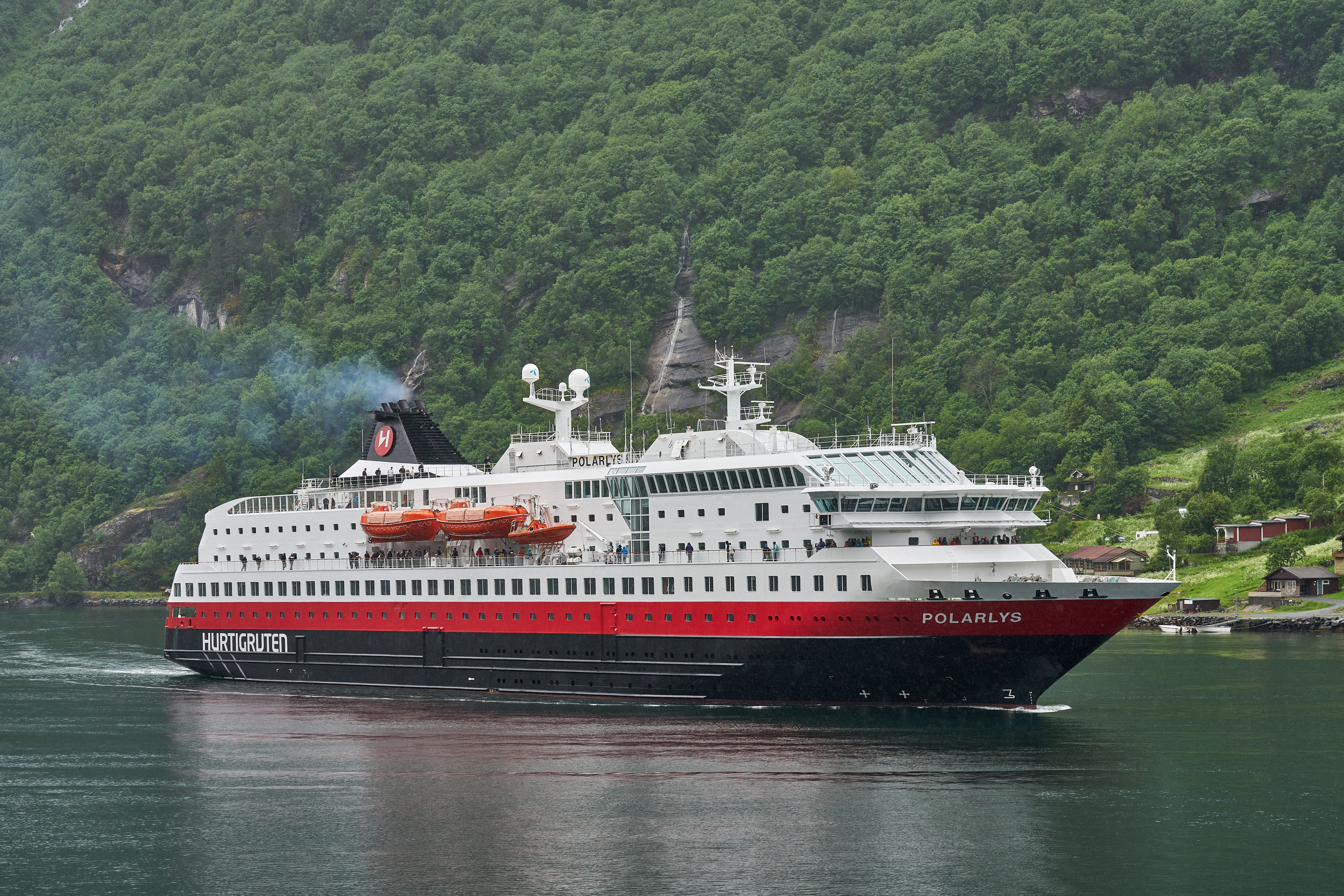
MS Polarlys is one of the 11 ships that sail this route

Hurtigruten (lit. 'Fast Route'), formally Kystruten Bergen-Kirkenes ("coastal route Bergen-Kirkenes"), is a Norwegian public coastal route transporting passengers that travel locally, regionally, and between the ports of call, and also cargo between ports north of Tromsø.

The coastal route provides daily, year-round, and consistent traffic between Bergen and Kirkenes with 34 ports of call on northbound and 33 ports of call on southbound sailings. The Ministry of Transport and Communications in Norway has set minimum capacity requirements of 320 passengers, 120 berths, and 150 Euro-pallets for cargo. Historically, the route was operated jointly by several shipping companies. In 2006, the last two remaining Hurtigruten companies OVDS and TFDS merged to form the company Hurtigruten AS, named after the route. After the Norwegian transport ministry split the contract, Havila Kystruten AS has operated on the route alongside Hurtigruten AS since 2021. For daily northbound and southbound departures in all Hurtigruten ports, eleven ships are needed; seven of these are currently operated by Hurtigruten AS, four by Havila Kystruten.

== History ==
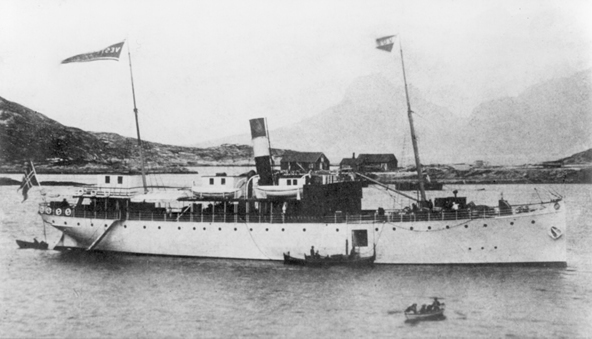
Vesteraalen near Bodø on her first round-trip in 1893.

Hurtigruten was established in 1893 by government contract to improve communications along Norway's long, jagged coastline. Vesteraalen began the first round-trip journey from Trondheim on 2 July 1893 bound for Hammerfest, with calls at Rørvik, Brønnøysund, Sandnessjøen, Bodø, Svolvær, Lødingen, Harstad, Tromsø, and Skjervøy. The ship arrived at Svolvær on Monday 3 July at 8 pm after 35½ hours and at Hammerfest on Wednesday 5 July after 67 hours. She was commanded by the founder of the route Richard With. At that time this was the fastest route between northern and southern Norway, and this resulted in the route being named Hurtigruten (express route). As of 2008, the Trondheim–Svolvær trip took 33 hours and the Trondheim–Hammerfest trip took 41 hours 15 min.

Before Hurtigruten opened, only Vesteraalens Dampskibsselskab was willing to make the trip through the then poorly-charted waters; the voyage was especially difficult during the long, dark winters. The company had for itself made detailed sailing instructions. Hurtigruten was a substantial breakthrough for communities along its path. Mail from central Norway to Hammerfest, which used to take three weeks in summer and five months in winter, could now be delivered in seven days.

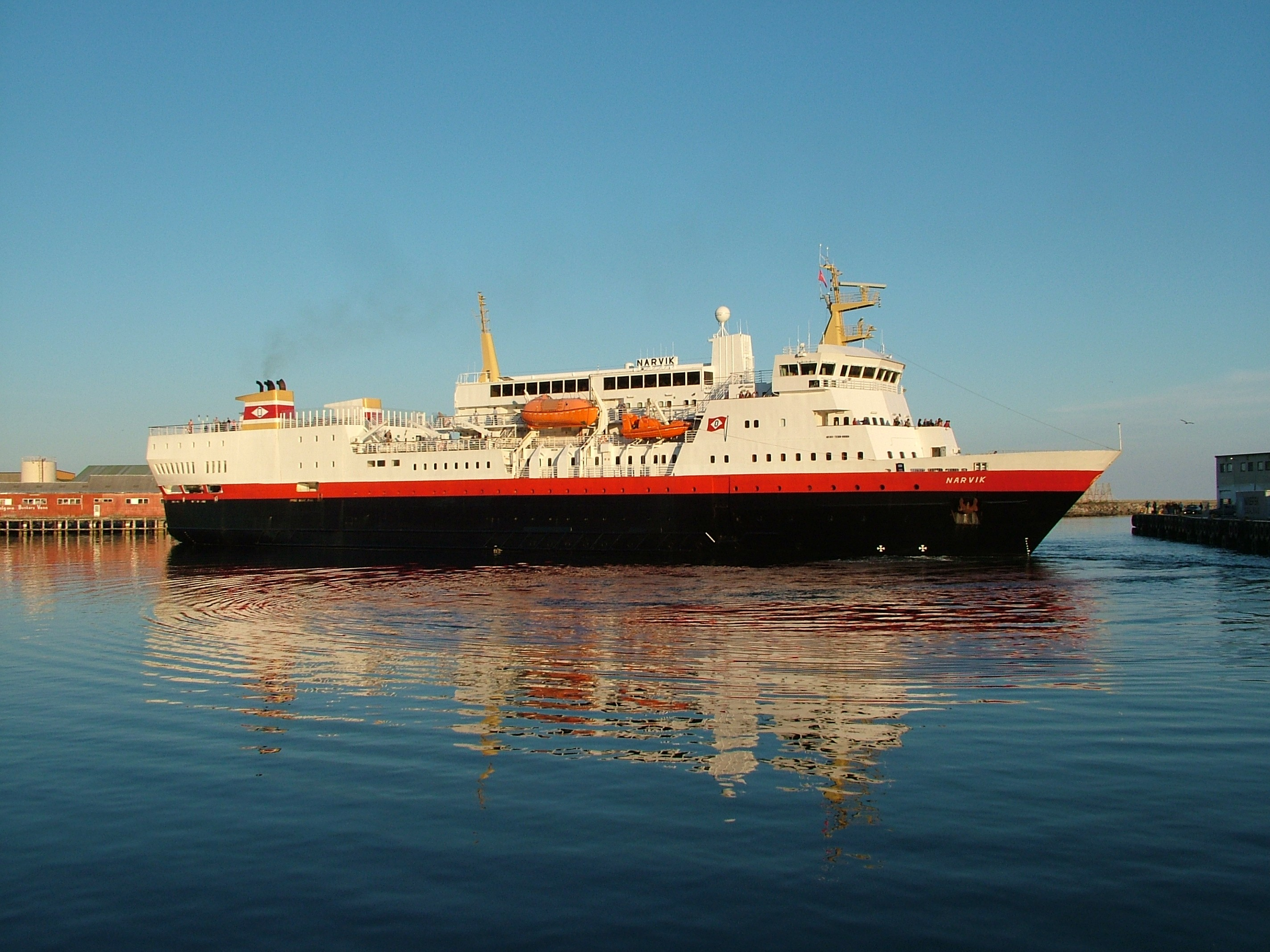
The 1982-built Narvik in Svolvær. The ship was sold in 2007.

Encouraged by Vesteraalens' early success, several other shipping companies obtained a concession to operate the route, extended to run between Bergen in the southwest and Kirkenes in the far northeast. A fleet of 11 ships visits each of the 34 ports daily, both northbound and southbound.

Until the 1940s, most ports north of Trondheim could not be reached by road from Oslo, so the sea was the only means of access. Beginning in the 1960s, the role of Hurtigruten changed, in part because of the construction of a local airport network and road improvements. Operating subsidies were gradually phased out, and the operators put more emphasis on tourism. New, bigger, and more luxurious ships were introduced in the 1980s, with attention given to hot tubs, bars, restaurants, and other comforts. However, Hurtigruten still serves important passenger and cargo needs, and operates 365 days a year. The last two independent shipping companies, Ofotens og Vesteraalens Dampskibsselskab (OVDS) and Troms Fylkes Dampskibsselskap (TFDS), merged on 1 March 2006 as the Hurtigruten Group, a year later becoming Hurtigruten ASA. In 2015, Hurtigruten was delisted from the Oslo stock exchange after the company was acquired by the private equity group TDR Capital.

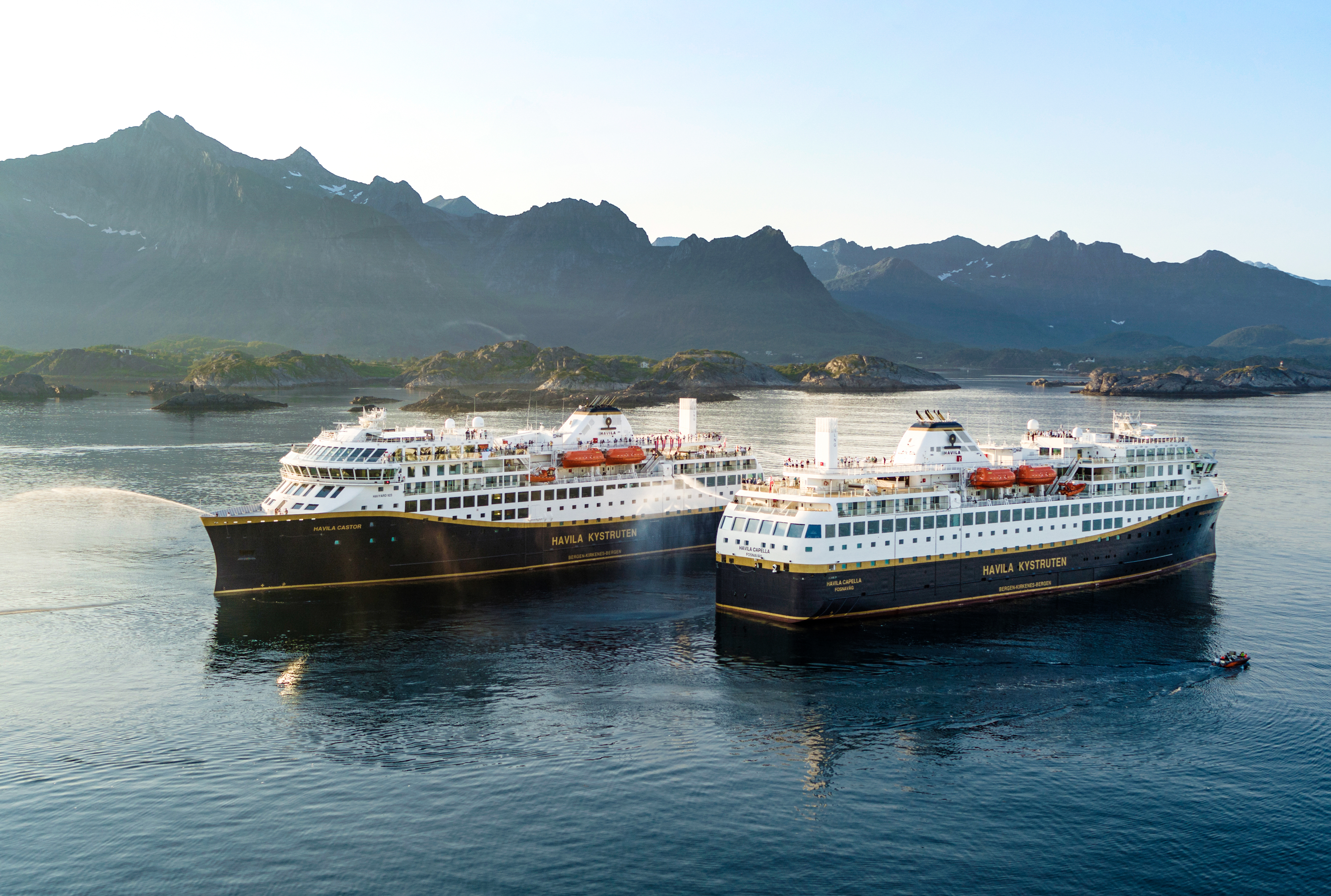
Havila Capella and Havila Castor meet for the first time along the coastal express route.

== New contracts ==
The Ministry of Transport and Communications in Norway announced in 2017 that the Hurtigruten contract was split into three contracts. The contracts were put up for bid and in the end, two were granted to Hurtigruten and one to Havila Kystruten AS, with each operating seven and four ships respectively. The two companies alternate departure days for the entire route from Bergen to Kirkenes.

The four new vessels from Havila run on Liquefied natural gas (LNG) and battery power. LNG will cut CO_{2} emissions by 25%, and the battery power will yield additional savings. The vessels are named Havila Capella, Havila Castor, Havila Polaris, and Havila Pollux. All four vessels were built at Tersan shipyard in Turkey.

Existing vessels from Hurtigruten were modernized and renovated to meet the new requirements. MS Midnatsol, MS Trollfjord and MS Finnmarken were modernized and renovated with a Scandinavian interior style.

The ships were fitted with filters and LNG-compatible engines to reduce emissions by 25%. The ships also received hybrid motors, and battery packs.

As of April 2022, one of the ships of Havila Kystruten, MS Havila Capella, was taken out of service; because of sanctions imposed as a result of the 2022 Russian invasion of Ukraine, the ship no longer had insurance cover, as the company's four ships were at that time financed by a Russian company. The issue was resolved in June 2022 with a change of the ship's ownership.

== Current fleet ==
As of 2024, this is a list of ships sailing on the Hurtigruten.

| Name | Built | Gross tonnage | Operator | Image | Ref |
|---|---|---|---|---|---|
| MS Vesterålen | 1983 | 6,261 | Hurtigruten AS | | |
| MS Kong Harald | 1993 | 11,204 | Hurtigruten AS | | |
| MS Richard With | 1993 | 11,205 | Hurtigruten AS | | |
| MS Nordlys (1994) | 1994 | 11,204 | Hurtigruten AS | | |
| MS Polarlys (1995) | 1996 | 11,341 | Hurtigruten AS | | |
| MS Nordkapp | 1996 | 11,386 | Hurtigruten AS | | |
| MS Nordnorge (1997) | 1997 | 11,384 | Hurtigruten AS | | |
| MS Havila Capella | 2021 | 15,519 | Havila Kystruten | Havila Capella | |
| MS Havila Castor | 2022 | 15,519 | Havila Kystruten | | |
| MS Havila Polaris | 2023 | 15,519 | Havila Kystruten | | |
| MS Havila Pollux | 2023 | 15,519 | Havila Kystruten | | |

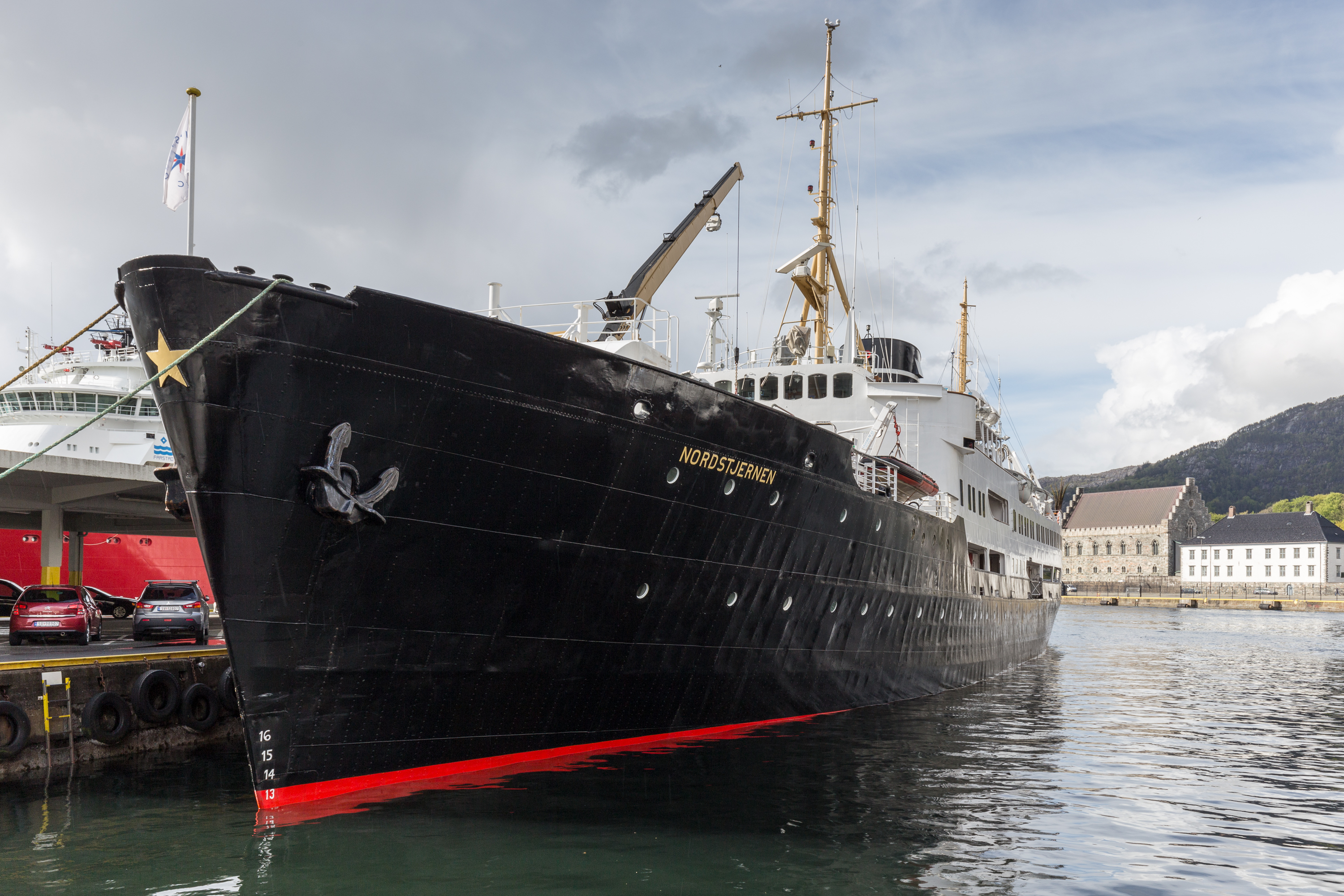
MS Nordstjernen in Bergen

== Places visited on coastal route ==
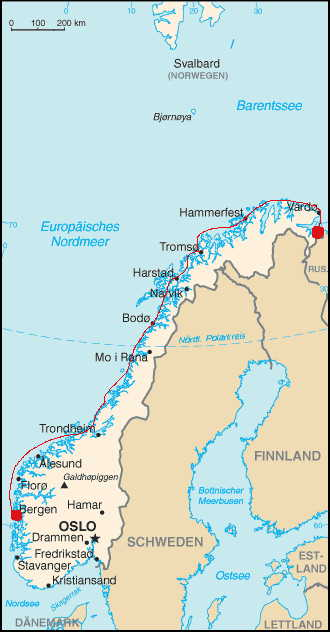
Hurtigruten Route

In order, northbound:

- Bergen (60°23′32″N 5°18′40″E)
- Florø (61°36′6″N 5°1′33″E)
- Måløy (61°56′0″N 5°6′52″E)
- Torvik (62°20′12″N 5°43′41″E)
- Ålesund (62°28′32″N 6°9′10″E)
- Geiranger (summer only)
- Urke, Ørsta (September & October only)
- Molde (62°44′05″N 7°9′25″E)
- Kristiansund (63°06′54″N 7°44′11″E)
- Trondheim (63°26′33″N 10°24′25″E)
- Rørvik (64°51′39″N 11°14′23″E)
- Brønnøysund (65°28′33″N 12°12′39″E)
- Sandnessjøen (66°01′27″N 12°38′17″E)
- Nesna (66°12′02″N 13°00′29″E)
- Ørnes (66°52′8″N 13°42′10″E)
- Bodø (67°17′24″N 14°23′45″E)
- Stamsund (68°7′14″N 13°50′25″E)
- Svolvær (68°13′51″N 14°33′59″E)
- Stokmarknes (68°34′16″N 14°54′40″E)
- Sortland (68°41′56″N 15°25′13″E)
- Risøyhamn (68°58′4″N 15°38′28″E)
- Harstad (68°47′57″N 16°32′54″E)
- Finnsnes (69°13′44″N 17°58′25″E)
- Tromsø (69°38′54″N 18°57′45″E)
- Skjervøy (70°2′6″N 20°58′57″E)
- Øksfjord (70°14′14″N 22°20′55″E)
- Hammerfest (70°39′53″N 23°40′51″E)
- Havøysund (70°59′42″N 24°41′14″E)
- Honningsvåg (70°58′51″N 25°58′7″E)
- Kjøllefjord (70°56′58″N 27°19′54″E)
- Mehamn (71°02′29″N 27°50′34″E)
- Berlevåg (70°51′26″N 29°6′54″E)
- Båtsfjord (70°37′46″N 29°43′21″E)
- Vardø (70°22′27″N 31°6′16″E)
- Vadsø (70°4′14″N 29°44′10″E)
- Kirkenes (69°43′43″N 30°4′19″E)

== Live television broadcast ==
As part of its slow television series, the Norwegian Broadcasting Corporation transmitted non-stop the Hurtigruten ship MS Nordnorge's 134-hour voyage from Bergen to Kirkenes, which started on June 16, 2011.

== Post-World War II accidents and incidents ==
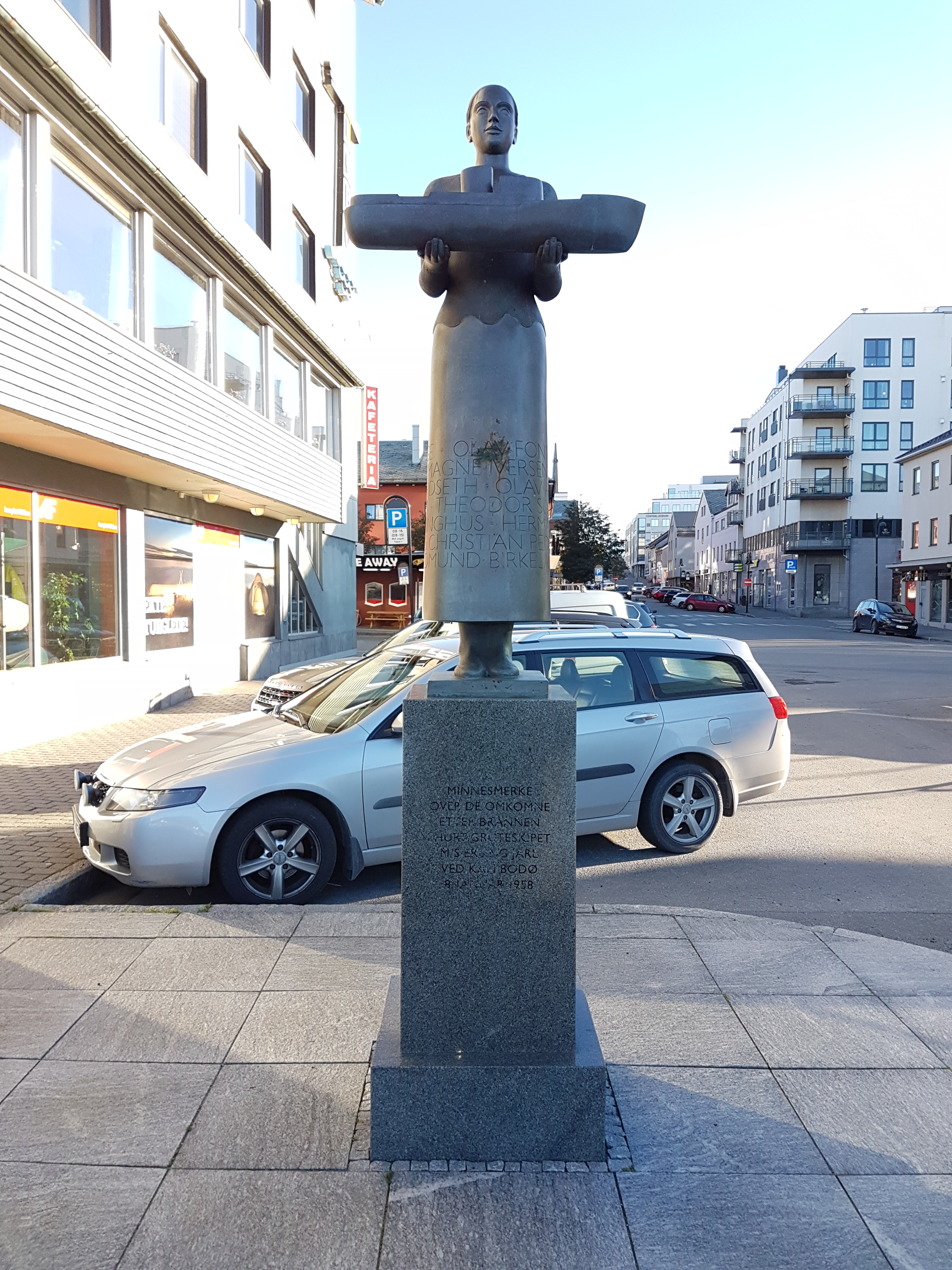
Memorial in Bodø commemorating the incident on board Erling Jarl in 1958

Before World War II, a number of ships perished, usually because they ran aground in bad visibility.

Most of the Hurtigruten fleet was sunk during World War II.

In September 1954 SS Nordstjernen ran aground in Raftsundet at night. The ship started taking on water and eventually sank. Of the 157 passengers and 46 crew members on board, five died.

On 8 January 1958, a fire broke out on board MS Erling Jarl while the vessel was docked at Bodø. Fourteen people died of smoke inhalation. Today a memorial to the incident stands at Bodø.

On 21 October 1962 MS Sanct Svithun ran onto a reef in the maritime area Folda in Nord-Trøndelag because of a major navigational error after leaving Trondheim. Of 89 persons on board (passengers, crew and two postal officers) 41 died.

In 2011 MS Nordlys suffered an engine room fire, leading to two deaths among the crew.

== Bibliography ==
- Bakka, Dag (1980). Skipene som bandt kysten sammen: Hurtigruten, 1893 - 1980 [The Ships Travelling Along the Coast: Hurtigruten 1893-1980]. Bergen: gens Tidende og Eides Boktrykkeri. OCLC 834930062.
- Bakka, Dag; Kolltveit, Bård; Mo, Sverre (2003). Hurtigruten: sjøveien mot nord [Hurtigruten: by sea to the north] (in Norwegian) (rev. ed.). Bergen: Seagull. ISBN 8291258171.
- Bakka, Dag (2011). Livslinje og eventyrreise: historien om Hurtigruten [Lifeline and Adventure Travel: A History of Hurtigruten] (in Norwegian). Bergen: Bodoni. ISBN 9788271286255.
- Bent, Mike (1987). Coastal Express: the ferry to the top of the world. London: Conway Maritime Press. ISBN 0851774466.
- Bryant, John (2012). Hurtigruten 120: The Complete Story. Ramsey, Isle of Man: Ferry Publications. ISBN 9781906608682.
- Bryant, John (2013). Hurtigruten 120. Ramsey, Isle of Man: Ferry Publications. ISBN 9781906608637.
- Stavseth, Redar (1963). Nordover med Hurtigruten: Historie og hverdagsbilder gjennom sytti år [Northward with Hurtigruten: History and everyday images through seventy years] (in Norwegian). Oslo: Grundt Tanum. OCLC 504478333.
- Storrusten, Erling (1994). Hurtigruten: the world's most beautiful sea voyage. Narvik: Ofotens og Vesteraalens Dampskibsselskab. ISBN 8299315409.
