= Svein Gjelseth =

Norwegian politician (born 1950)

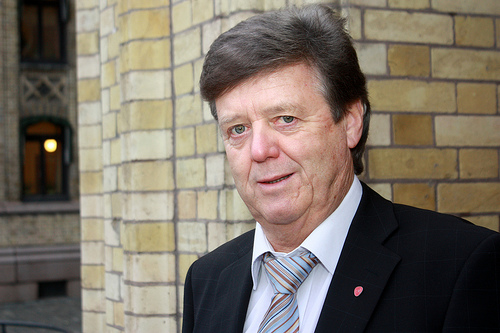
Svein Gjelseth

Svein Gjelseth (born 2 February 1950) is a Norwegian politician for the Labour Party.

He served in the position of deputy representative to the Norwegian Parliament from Møre og Romsdal in the term 2005–2009, meeting as a regular representative for two years meanwhile Karita Bekkemellem was appointed to the Cabinet. Gjelseth was a member of the Standing Committee on Transport and Communications.

Gjelseth held various positions on the municipal council for Herøy Municipality from 1979 to 2003, serving as mayor there from 1989 to 1991.
