= Arnulf Goksøyr =

Norwegian politician (born 1963)

Arnulf Goksøyr (born 4 July 1963) is a Norwegian politician for the Conservative Party.

He served as a deputy representative to the Parliament of Norway from Møre og Romsdal during the term 2013–2017. In local politics, he became a member of the municipal council for Herøy Municipality in 1995 and has served as mayor since 2003.
