= Careproctus argosgeorgiae =

Scientific classification
- Kingdom: Animalia
- Phylum: Chordata
- Class: Actinopterygii
- Division: Teleostei
- Order: Perciformes
- Suborder: Cottoidei
- Family: Liparidae
- Genus: Careproctus
- Species: C. argosgeorgiae

Binomial name
- Careproctus argosgeorgiae Villarroel-Perez & Chernova, 2026

Species of deep-sea snailfish

Careproctus argosgeorgiae is a species of deep-sea snailfish in the family Liparidae. It was described in 2026 from the Falkland Plateau in the western South Atlantic and is known from a single specimen collected northeast of the Falkland Islands at a depth of 1,680 m.

== Description ==
Careproctus argosgeorgiae has a stout body with thick gelatinous tissue beneath the skin. It has 47 vertebrae, 42 dorsal-fin rays, 34 anal-fin rays and 37 pectoral-fin rays. The gill slit reaches the 18th pectoral-fin ray and the pelvic sucking disk is relatively large. In life, the body is uniformly light orange, with deeper orange margins on the pelvic disk and pectoral fins.

== Distribution ==
The species is known only from the Falkland Plateau, northeast of the Falkland Islands. The holotype was collected at a depth of 1,680 m during a longline fishing operation on 10 October 2024.

== Etymology ==
The specific epithet argosgeorgiae honours the fishing vessel Argos Georgia, which sank in the South Atlantic near the Falkland Islands on 22 July 2024. The name is a Latin feminine genitive meaning "of the Argos Georgia", commemorating the vessel, its crew and all those connected with it.
