= Herøy Bridge =

Bridge in Møre og Romsdal, Norway

Herøy Bridge Herøybrua
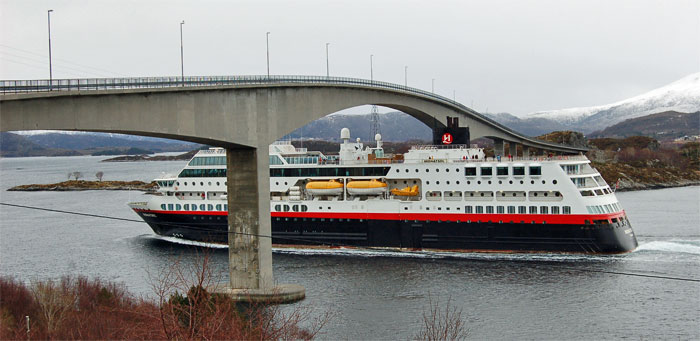
- View of the Herøy Bridge
- Coordinates: 62°19′10″N 5°43′15″E
- Carries: Fylkesvei 654
- Crosses: Røyrasundet
- Locale: Herøy Municipality, Norway

Characteristics
- Design: Cantilever bridge
- Total length: 544 m (1,785 ft)
- Longest span: 170 m (560 ft)
- Clearance below: 32 m (105 ft)

History
- Opened: 1976
- Inaugurated: 4 September 1976

The Herøy Bridge (Norwegian: Herøybrua) is a cantilever bridge that connects the islands of Gurskøya and Leinøya in Herøy Municipality, Møre og Romsdal county, Norway. It is part of a bridge network which connects all of the main islands of the municipality. The bridge is located about 8 kilometres (5.0 mi) southeast of the town of Fosnavåg.

The bridge is 544 metres (1,785 ft) long, the longest span is 170 metres (560 ft), and the maximum clearance to the sea is 32 metres (105 ft). Herøy Bridge was opened by King Olav V on 4 September 1976.

== See also ==
- Remøy Bridge
- Runde Bridge
- Nerlandsøy Bridge
- List of bridges in Norway
- List of bridges in Norway by length
- List of bridges
- List of longest bridges in the world
