= Leikong =

Village in Herøy Municipality in Møre og Romsdal, Norway

- Village
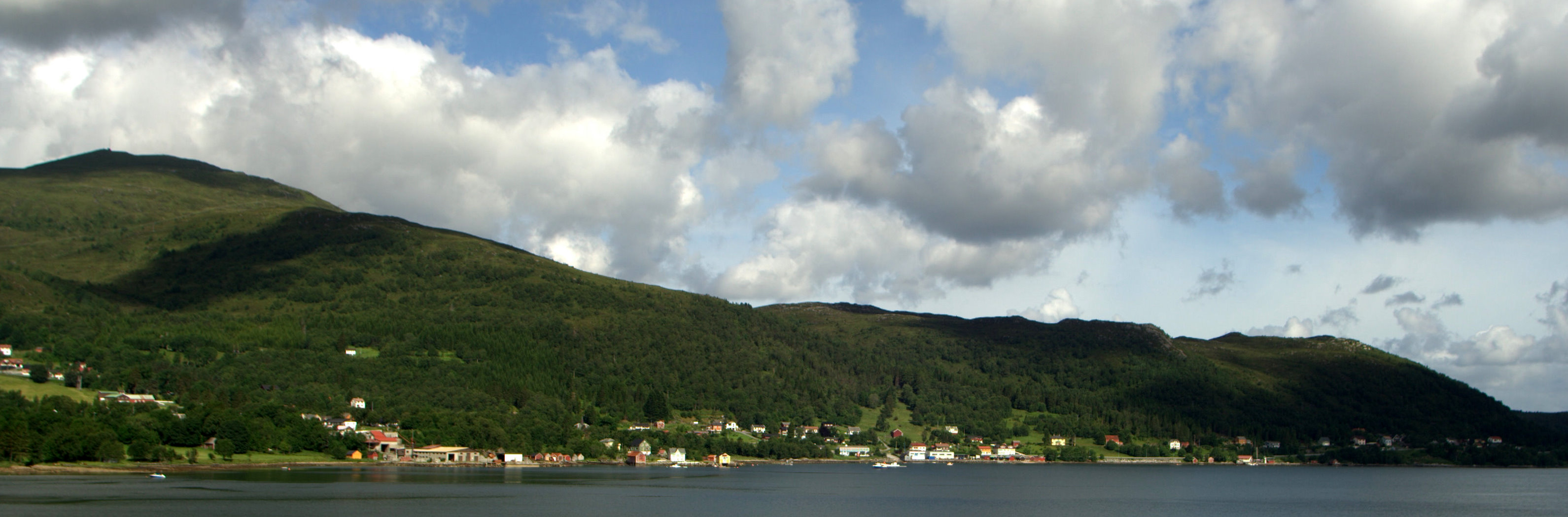
- View of the village
- Interactive map of Leikong
- Location within Møre og Romsdal Location within Norway
- Coordinates: 62.2472°N 5.7817°E
- Country: Norway
- Region: Western Norway
- County: Møre og Romsdal
- District: Sunnmøre
- Municipality: Herøy Municipality

Area
  - Total: 0.38 km^{2} (0.15 sq mi)
- Elevation: 14 m (46 ft)

Population (2022)
  - Total: 339
  - Density: 892/km^{2} (2,310/sq mi)
- Time zone: UTC+01:00 (CET)
  - Summer (DST): UTC+02:00 (CEST)
- Post Code: 6080 Gurskøy

Leikong is a village in Herøy Municipality in Møre og Romsdal county, Norway. The village is located on the eastern side of the island of Gurskøya. Historically, Leikong has been a regional centre for trade. It is located along a main road on the island of Gurskøya, but it is also located along the confluence of several fjords: Vartdalsfjorden, Voldsfjorden, Ørstafjorden, and Rovdefjorden. The village is home to Leikanger Church.

The 0.38-square-kilometre (94-acre) village had a population (2022) of 339 and a population density of 892 inhabitants per square kilometre (2,310/sq mi). Since 2022, the population and area data for this village area has not been separately tracked by Statistics Norway.
