= Torvik =

Torvik is a surname. Notable people with the surname include:

- Ansgar Torvik (1925–2019), Norwegian physician
- Gisle Torvik (born 1975), Norwegian jazz musician
- Otto Torvik (1901–1988), Norwegian Lutheran missionary
