= Runde Bridge =

Bridge in Møre og Romsdal, Norway

Runde Bridge Rundebrua
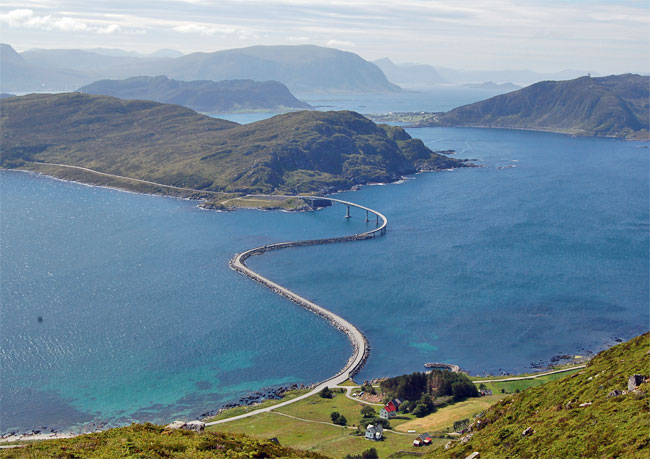
- View of the Runde Bridge (looking south)
- Coordinates: 62°22′45″N 05°37′39″E
- Carries: Fylkesvei 5876
- Crosses: Rundesundet
- Locale: Herøy Municipality, Norway

Characteristics
- Design: Cantilever bridge
- Total length: 428 m (1,404 ft)

History
- Opened: 3 March 1982

The Runde Bridge (Norwegian: Rundebrua) is a cantilever bridge that crosses the Rundasundet between the islands Remøya and Runde in Herøy Municipality in Møre og Romsdal county, Norway.

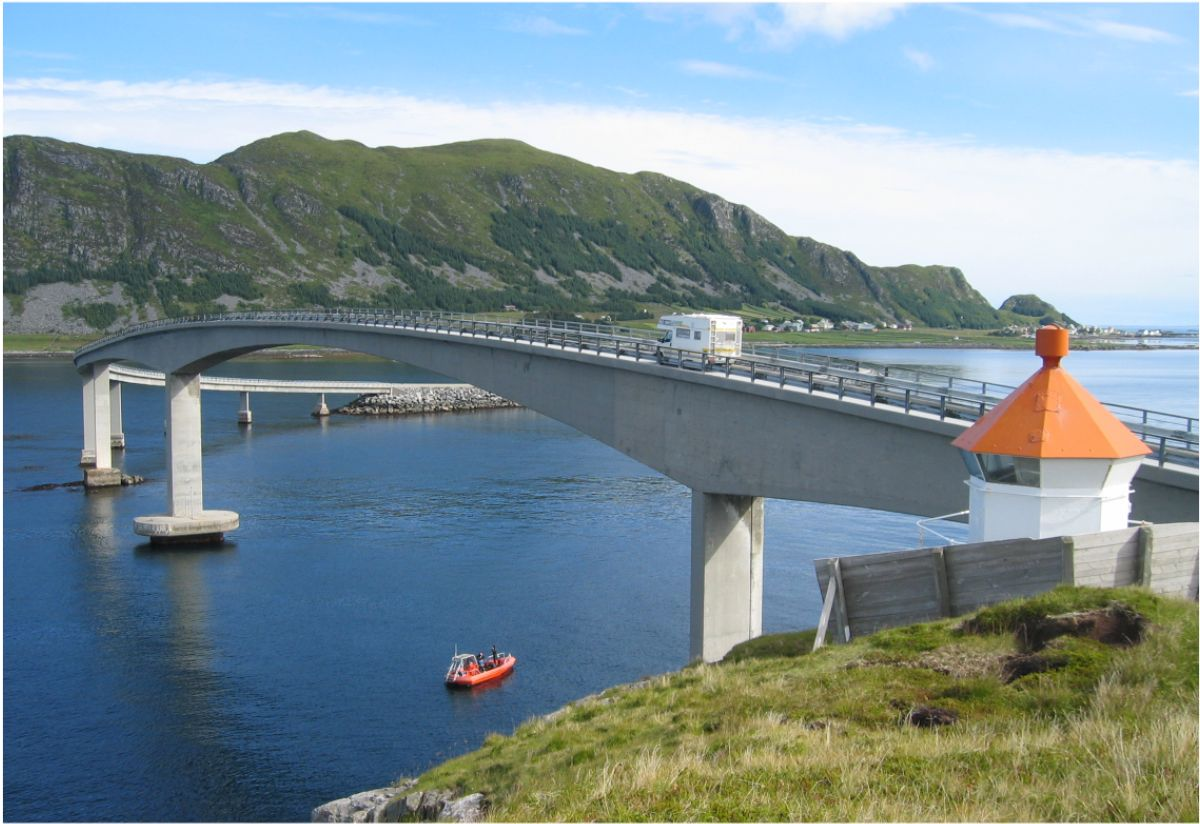
The Runde Bridge

Runde Bridge is located about 5 kilometres (3.1 mi) north of the town of Fosnavåg and about 12 kilometres (7.5 mi) northwest of the town of Ulsteinvik. The 428-metre-long (1,404 ft) bridge carries the Fylkesvei 5876 highway. Runde Bridge opened on 3 March 1982.

== See also ==
- Herøy Bridge
- Remøy Bridge
- Nerlandsøy Bridge
- List of bridges in Norway
- List of bridges in Norway by length
- List of bridges
- List of bridges by length
