= Havila Castor =

Ship built in 2022

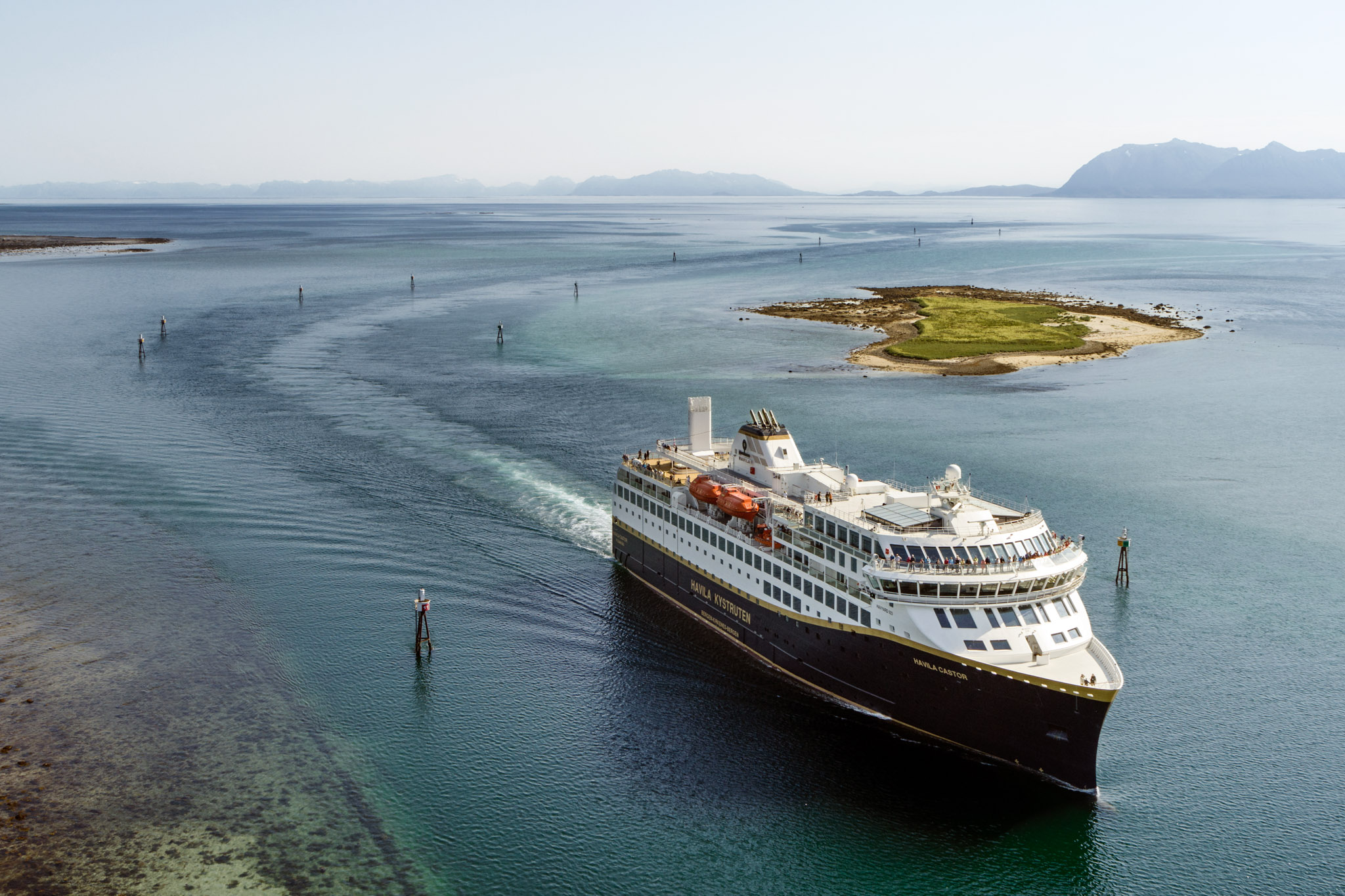

History
- Name: Havila Castor
- Owner: GTLK ASIA M11 LIMITED
- Operator: Havila Kystruten
- Port of registry: (Norway) Fosnavåg
- Route: Bergen-Kirkenes-Bergen
- Builder: Tersan shipyard
- Cost: EUR 100 mill
- Yard number: 1094
- Christened: 14 November 2022
- Maiden voyage: 10 May 2022
- Identification: LFQW

General characteristics
- Type: Passenger ship
- Tonnage: 15,519 BT
- Length: 124.1 m (407 ft 2 in)
- Beam: 22 m (72 ft 2 in)
- Draught: 5.3 m (17 ft 5 in)
- Decks: 9
- Installed power: LNG and battery
- Speed: 18 knots (33 km/h; 21 mph) max
- Capacity: 640 passengers
- Crew: 78

Havila Castor is a cruise ship that operates the coastal route Bergen–Kirkenes on the basis of a contract between the shipping company Havila Kystruten and the Ministry of Transport. The ship was built at the Tersan Shipyard in Turkey, and was delivered in April 2022. It is 124.1 metres (407 ft 2 in) long and 22 m (72 ft 2 in) wide, and has a capacity of 640 passengers. It had its maiden voyage on 10 May 2022.

On 2 June 2022 the ship made history, being the first cruise ship to operate the world heritage area, The Geirangerfjord, emission-free.

In 2023, the ship has one identical sister ship, Havila Capella.
