= Argos Georgia =

Fishing vessel that sank in 2024

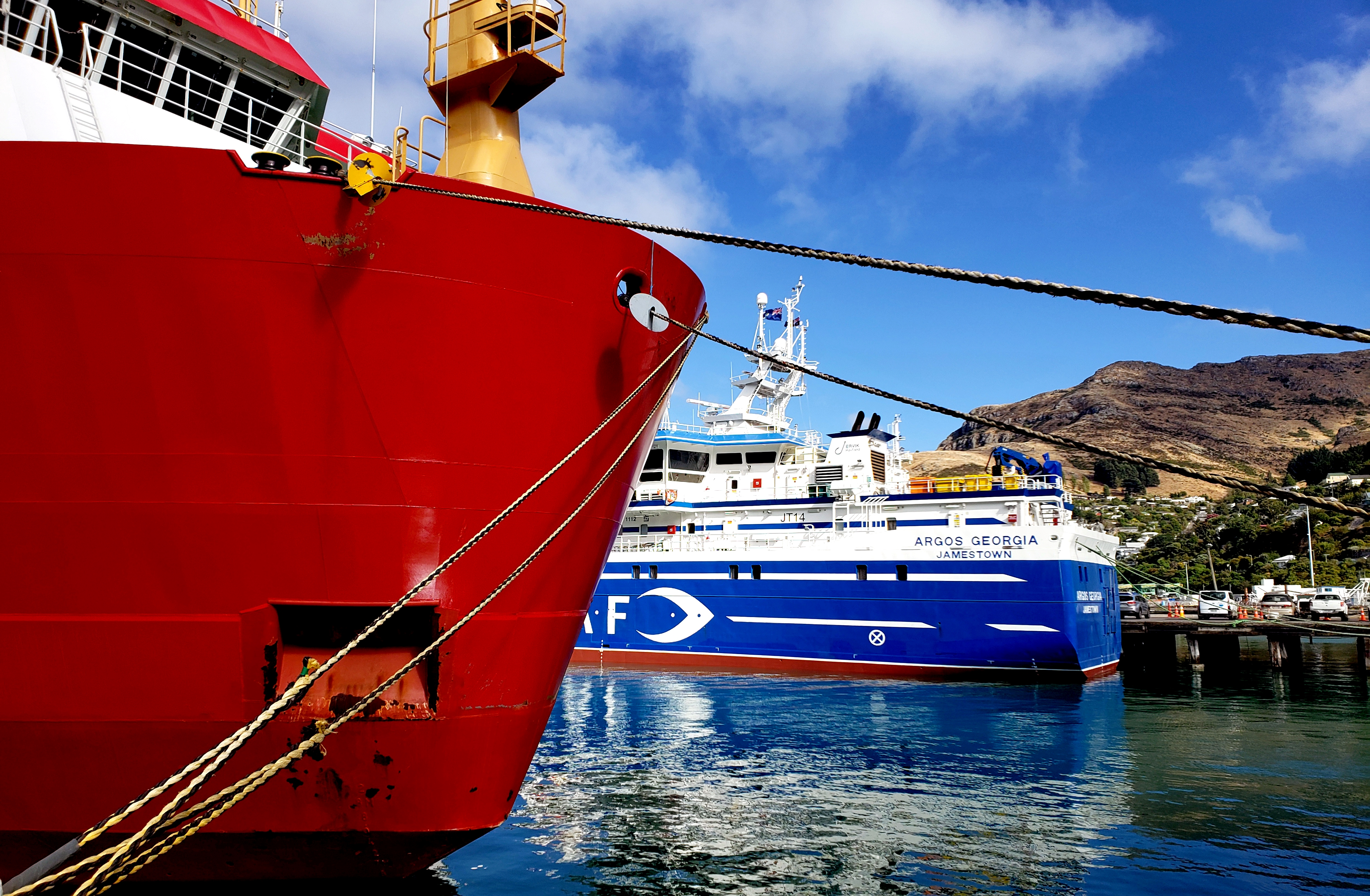
- FV Argos Georgia (blue with white stripes)

History
- Name: FV Argos Georgia
- Owner: Argos Froyanes Ltd
- Builder: Tersan Shipyard, Yalova, Turkey
- Launched: 2018
- In service: 2018–2024
- Fate: Sank east of Stanley, Falkland Islands, on 22 July 2024

General characteristics
- Type: Longline fishing vessel
- Length: 53.85 m (176.7 ft)
- Beam: 13 m (43 ft)
- Draught: 5.5 m (18 ft)
- Installed power: 1,920 kW (2,570 hp)
- Propulsion: Yanmar 6EY26W main engine
- Crew: 27

The fishing vessel F/V Argos Georgia was a longline fishing ship registered in Saint Helena. On 22 July 2024, the vessel sank approximately 190 nautical miles (220 mi; 350 km) east of Stanley, Falkland Islands, resulting in the loss of 13 lives; there were 14 survivors.

== Vessel details ==
Built in 2018 at the Tersan Shipyard in Yalova, Turkey, the Argos Georgia measured 53.85 meters in length, with a beam of 13 meters and a draught of 5.5 meters. The vessel had a gross tonnage of 2,004 and was equipped with a Yanmar 6EY26W 1,920kW main engine. Owned and operated by the Anglo-Norwegian company Argos Froyanes Ltd, the Argos Georgia was primarily engaged in fishing for Patagonian toothfish in the Southern Ocean under the CCAMLR scheme.

== Sinking ==
On 22 July 2024, while on route from Stanley in the Falkland Islands to the fishing grounds near South Georgia, the Argos Georgia encountered severe weather conditions, including waves up to 10 metres (33 ft) and winds exceeding 50 knots (58 mph; 93 km/h). During this time, a starboard side shell door malfunctioned, descending slowly into the fully open position and allowing significant water ingress. The crew's inability to close the shell door, combined with open internal doors, led to uncontrolled flooding and the vessel's eventual sinking.

== Rescue efforts and casualties ==
Search and rescue operations were launched immediately by the Falkland Islands authorities, in coordination with UK and international partners.

The Falkland Islands Maritime Authority, the Government of South Georgia and the South Sandwich Islands, British Forces South Atlantic, the UK Maritime and Coastguard Agency, the vessel’s owners, and nearby fishing vessels all worked together in the response.

The vessel had 27 crew members on board at the time of the sinking. Their nationalities were: 10 Spaniards, eight Russians, five Indonesians, two Peruvians and two Uruguayans, with an age range between 30 and 58 years old.

Fourteen crew members were rescued and transported to King Edward VII Memorial Hospital in Stanley, Falkland Islands, while nine were confirmed dead, and four were missing or lost at sea.

The survivors were initially searched by BFSAI A-400, BFSAI Search and Rescue helicopters and rescued by the British patrol vessel Lilibet and nearby fishing vessels, including the Robin M Lee (UK) and Puerto Toro (Chile).

== Investigation and safety recommendations ==
The UK's Marine Accident Investigation Branch (MAIB) conducted an investigation into the sinking. The preliminary findings highlighted several safety issues:

- The mechanism intended to keep the shell door closed failed, allowing it to open during adverse weather conditions.
- Open internal doors facilitated the spread of flooding to adjacent compartments.
- The crew was unable to close the shell door once it had opened.

In response, the MAIB issued a safety bulletin recommending that owners, operators, and skippers of fishing vessels with side shell doors urgently assess the risk of water ingress through these doors and implement measures to mitigate such risks.

== Memorial ==
Following the shipwreck, on 2 August 2024 the crew of the vessel Argos Helena held a memorial service at the sinking site to honor the lives lost in the incident.

On 4 August 2024, the Falkland Islands community gathered for a memorial service at the Falkland Islands Defense Force Hall in Stanley, where Acting Governor Adam Pile paid respects to the nine confirmed dead and four missing crew members.

In St Helena, a public memorial service was held on 19 September 2024 at St James Church in Jamestown to honor the Argos Georgia crew and to thank those involved in the rescue mission.

A new species of snailfish, Careproctus argosgeorgiae, was named to honour the vessel and crew

== See also ==
- List of shipwrecks in 2024
