= Havila Capella =

Ship built in 2021

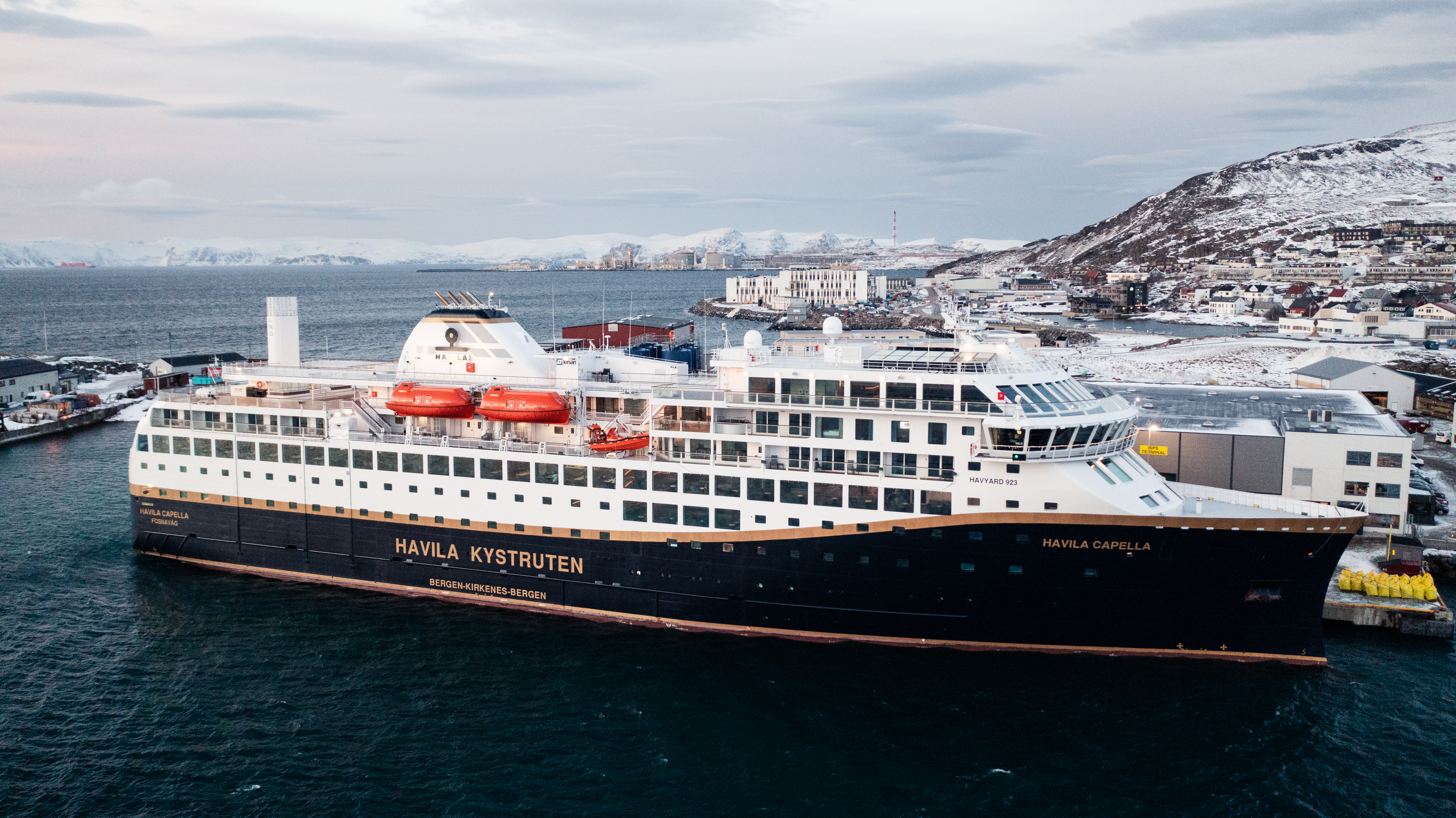

History
- Name: Havila Capella
- Owner: GTLK ASIA M11 LIMITED
- Operator: Havila Kystruten
- Port of registry: (Norway) Fosnavåg
- Route: Bergen-Kirkenes-Bergen
- Builder: Tersan Shipyard
- Cost: EUR 100 mill
- Yard number: 1093
- Laid down: 6 February 2019
- Launched: 4 September 2020
- Christened: 8 November 2022
- Maiden voyage: 12 December 2021
- Identification: LFQY

General characteristics
- Type: Passenger ship
- Tonnage: 15,519 BT
- Length: 124.1 m (407 ft 2 in)
- Beam: 22 m (72 ft 2 in)
- Draught: 5.3 m (17 ft 5 in)
- Decks: 9
- Installed power: LNG and battery
- Speed: 18 knots (33 km/h; 21 mph) max
- Capacity: 640 passengers
- Crew: 78

Havila Capella is a ship that operates the coastal route Bergen–Kirkenes on the basis of a contract between the shipping company Havila Kystruten and the Ministry of Transport. The ship was built at the Tersan Shipyard in Turkey, and was delivered in November 2021. It is 124.1 metres (407 ft 2 in) long and 22 m (72 ft 2 in) wide, and has a capacity of 640 passengers. The vessel's maiden voyage took place on 12 December 2021.

In 2022, it was awarded the "Next Generation Ship Award" during the business fair Nor-Shipping.

In 2023, the ship has one sister ship, Havila Castor.
