= Remøy Bridge =

Bridge in Møre og Romsdal, Norway

Remøy Bridge Remøybrua
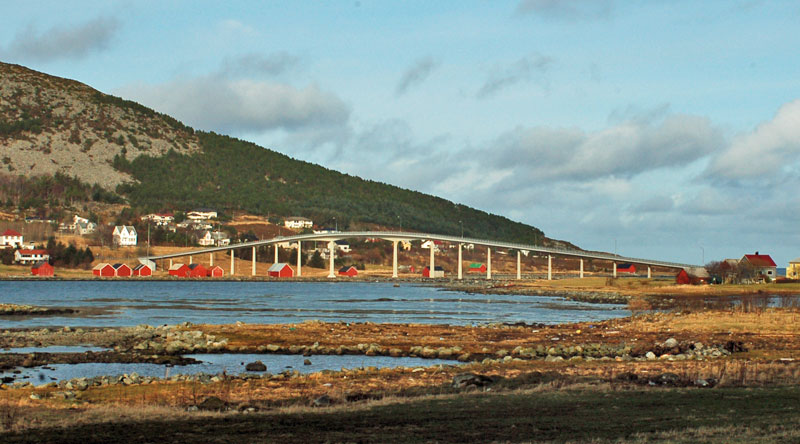
- Remøybrua
- Coordinates: 62.3647515°N 5.6729727°E
- Carries: Fylkesvei 5876
- Crosses: Nordre Vaulen
- Locale: Herøy Municipality, Norway

Characteristics
- Total length: 340 m (1,120 ft)

History
- Opened: 1967

The Remøy Bridge (Norwegian: Remøybrua) is a bridge from connecting the islands of Leinøya and Remøya in Herøy Municipality in Møre og Romsdal county, Norway. The bridge carries the county road 5876 over the Nordre Vaulen strait.

The 340-metre-long (1,120 ft) bridge opened in 1967. The bridge is about 3 kilometres (1.9 mi) northeast of the town of Fosnavåg and about 10 kilometres (6.2 mi) northwest of the town of Ulsteinvik. The bridge is part of a network of bridges that connect all the main islands of Herøy Municipality.

== See also ==
- Runde Bridge
- Herøy Bridge
- Nerlandsøy Bridge
- List of bridges in Norway
- List of bridges in Norway by length
- List of bridges
- List of bridges by length
