= Nerlandsøy Bridge =

Bridge in Møre og Romsdal, Norway

Nerlandsøy Bridge Nerlandsøybrua
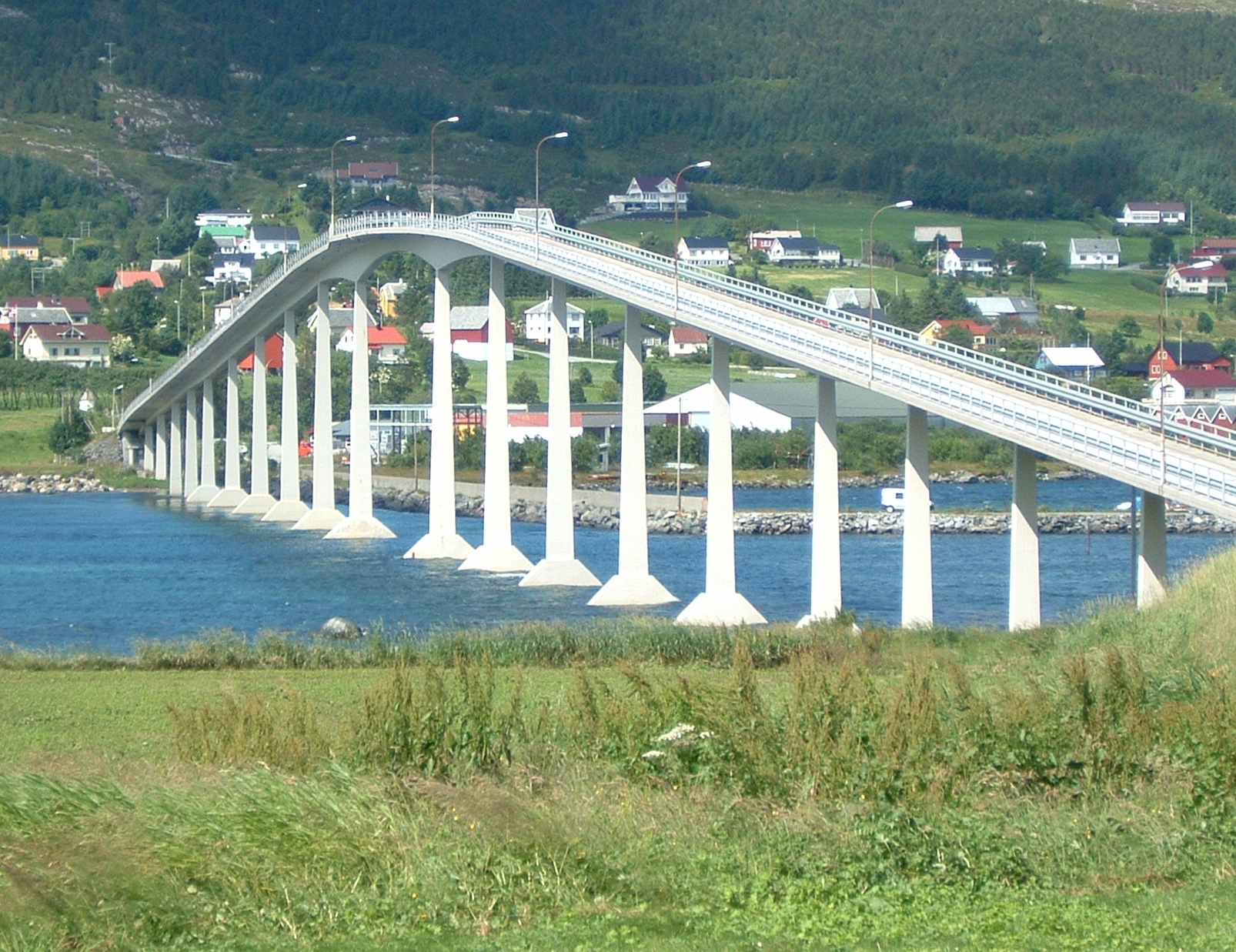
- Nerlandsøy Bridge seen from Igesund
- Coordinates: 62.3399°N 5.60648°E
- Carries: Fylkesvei 20
- Crosses: Søre Vaulen
- Locale: Herøy Municipality, Norway

Characteristics
- Total length: 405 m (1,329 ft)

History
- Opened: 25 September 1968

The Nerlandsøy Bridge (Norwegian: Nerlandsøybrua) is a bridge that crosses the Søre Vaulen strait between the islands of Bergsøya and Nerlandsøya in Herøy Municipality in Møre og Romsdal county, Norway.

The 405-metre (1,329 ft) long Nerlandsøy Bridge opened on 25 September 1968. It is just west of the town of Fosnavåg and it is part of the bridge network that connects all of the main islands of Herøy Municipality.

== See also ==
- Remøy Bridge
- Runde Bridge
- Herøy Bridge
- List of bridges in Norway
- List of bridges in Norway by length
- List of bridges
- List of bridges by length
