= Otto Torvik =

Norwegian missionary

Otto Torvik (12 June 1901 – 8 April 1988) was a Norwegian missionary in Xinjiang and in India. He founded the Norwegian Missionary Muhammad Mission (Den Norske Muhammedanermisjon) in 1940. Today, the name is changed to Christian Muslim Mission (Kristen Muslimmisjon).

== Biography ==
Otto Torvik was born in Bolsøy Municipality, just east of the town of Molde in Romsdal, Norway. His father, Ingebrigt Taraldsen from Torvik in Romsdal, was a farmer and lay preacher. His mother was sick when Torvik was born, and she prayed that his son would to be used in the service of God.

He attended Rauma Folkehøgskole near Molde, where Torvik first heard of the overseas missions. The missionary call grew in him and he continued to study at Fjellhaug Internasjonale Høgskole in Oslo which was run by the Norwegian Lutheran China Mission Association. Torvik was awarded with a Master of theology by Augsburg Seminary (now Augsburg University) in Minneapolis, Minnesota. He also studied at Hartford Seminary in Hartford, Connecticut and was ordained in 1946.

In 1931, Torvik traveled to Chinese Turkistan to see if it was possible to start with a Christian mission there. In 1940 he founded the Norwegian Missionary Muhammad Mission (now Kristen Muslimmisjon). Torvik was a central role at the Mission serving as Secretary General between 1958 and 1966. Eight years later in 1948, Torvik traveled to India as a pioneer missionary. He built a mission station at Sajinipara in West Bengal which was the mission's first field mission in India.

== Personal life ==
Otto Torvik was married to Helene Wiebe (1908-1979), the descendant of Dutch and German immigrants, whom he metin Kyrgyzstan. In his later years, he and his family resided in Norway. He died during 1988. Both he and his wife were buried at Grorud kirkegård in Oslo.

== Authorship ==
- 1939 - Guds medarbeidere (published by Misjonskurset på Fjellhaug. new edition in 1986)
- 1939 - Mellom Muhammedanere (Bergen. new edition 1946)
- 1940 and 1942 - Abdulla Jan (Bergen)
- 1945 - Bak Himalaya (Bergen)
- 1961 - Muhammedanermisjon (Oslo)
- 1967 - Blant muhammedanere i India (Stavanger)
- 1971 - Frelse og ansvar (prekensamling) (Stavanger)
- 1981 - Helene fra Kirgisistan (Oslo)
- Article in Misjonshuset i Bergen (by A. Tangeraas, Oslo, 1945 p. 300-314)
- A series of articles in the magazine Lys over land

== Related reading ==
- Nils Bloch-Hoell (1954) Muhammad ideamission
- Jens Christensen (1959) Islam
- Torben Christensen (1957) En kirke blir til
- Nils Dybdal-Holthe (1976) På troens veier. Torviks 75-årsdag
- Nils Dybdal-Holthe (1989) På Jesu bud. NMM 50 år
- Olav Hodne (1967) The seed bore fruit : a short history of the Santal Mission of the Northern churches 1867-1967
- Gunnar Melbø (1951) Krigerprofeten: Islams grunnlegger
- O. G. Myklebust (1949) Muhammedanismen som misjonsproblem
- Geir Valle (1973) Religionene og kristen misjon
