= Tersan Shipyard =

Turkish shipyard

- Industry: Transport
- Founded: 1996
- Headquarters: Altınova, Turkey
- Key people: (COO)
- Products: shipbuilding
- Revenue: $774.1 M
- Number of employees: 3,177
- Website: www.tersanshipyard.com

Tersan Shipyard is a shipyard in Altınova, Yalova, Turkey. It specialises in the construction of offshore vessels, fishing vessels, specialised vessels, tankers and conversion. The company has repair facilities both in Yalova and Tuzla, Turkey. Tersan Shipyard built the world’s first LNG-powered coaster in 2011 and also built Turkey's first turn-key offshore and fishing vessel

== History ==
The Tersan Group was established in the mid-1990s as a ship service company providing agency services, operations and management for vessels passing through the Bosphorus, in and out of the Black Sea. During this period, the group purchased their own ships and started to operate worldwide.

In 1997, after acquiring a floating dock and a shipyard in Istanbul’s Tuzla district, the group extended their scope to ship repair and maintenance, docking around 50 to 70 ships per year. In 2001, the group established a separate shipbuilding yard in the same region of Tuzla/Istanbul. The first new building project was delivered in 2002, followed by a number of challenging new building projects until 2008.

Capacity of the Tuzla/Istanbul yard became insufficient for building offshore and Handymax commercial vessels. While the repair yard remaining in Tuzla/Istanbul, Tersan invested in a new yard in Yalova City in 2008, giving greater capacity but still benefitting from easy access to Istanbul. The new facilities in Yalova are one of the biggest and most modern shipyards in Europe. Development of the yard continues to incorporate upcoming technologies and the demand of new building projects. The yard employs about permanent 1000 personnel, increasing to 8000 depending on the workload of the projects.

== Ships built ==
Ships built by Tersan Shipyard
| name | yard number | type | year |
|---|---|---|---|
| TBA | NB1121 | Offshore Vessel | |
| TBA | NB1120 | Offshore Vessel | |
| Frøyanes | NB1118 | Fishing / Aqualculture | |
| TBA | NB1117 | Fishing / Aqualculture | |
| Norddalsfjord | NB1114 | Passenger Vessel | |
| Sunnylvsfjord | NB1113 | Passenger Vessel | |
| Magadan | NB1109 | Fishing / Aqualculture | |
| Jan Maria | NB1108 | Fishing / Aqualculture | |
| Atlantic Enterprise | NB1107 | Fishing / Aqualculture | |
| Emerald | NB1105 | Fishing / Aqualculture | |
| Havila Pollux | NB1104 | Passenger Vessel | 2023 |
| Havila Polaris | NB1103 | Passenger Vessel | 2023 |
| Gadus | NB1102 | Fishing / Aqualculture | |
| TBA | NB1099 | Fishing / Aqualculture | |
| Vladimir Biryukov | NB1106 | Fishing / Aqualculture | |
| Polar Bay | NB1101 | Fishing / Aqualculture | |
| Argos Helena | NB1100 | Fishing / Aqualculture | |
| Østerfjord | NB1098 | Fishing / Aqualculture | |
| Rødvenfjord | NB1097 | Passenger Vessel | |
| Georgiy Meshceryakov | NB1096 | Fishing / Aqualculture | |
| Oddrun With | NB1095 | General Cargo | |
| Havila Castor | NB1094 | Passenger Vessel | 2022 |
| Havila Capella | NB1093 | Passenger Vessel | 2021 |
| Eresfjord | NB1092 | Passenger Vessel | |
| Calvert | NB1091 | Fishing / Aqualculture | |
| Vladimir Limanov | NB1090 | Fishing / Aqualculture | |
| Harald Martin | NB1089 | Fishing / Aqualculture | |
| Bjørg Pauline | NB1088 | Fishing / Aqualculture | |
| Frøyanes Junior | NB1087 | Fishing / Aqualculture | |
| Vestkapp | NB1086 | Fishing / Aqualculture | |
| Atlantic | NB1085 | Fishing / Aqualculture | |
| Zenith | NB1083 | Fishing / Aqualculture | |
| Faerøy | NB1082 | Passenger Vessel | |
| Samnøy | NB1081 | Passenger Vessel | |
| Huftarøy | NB1080 | Passenger Vessel | |
| Samlafjord | NB1079 | Passenger Vessel | |
| Argos Georgia | NB1078 | Fishing / Aqualculture | |
| Nordicprince | NB1077 | Fishing / Aqualculture | |
| Horgefjord | NB1076 | Passenger Vessel | |
| Mokstrafjord | NB1075 | Passenger Vessel | |
| Eidsfjord | NB1074 | Passenger Vessel | |
| Gloppefjord | NB1073 | Passenger Vessel | |
| Sayan Prince | NB1072 | Offshore Vessel | |
| Ibrahim Nuh Paksu | NB1071 | Other Vessel | |
| Nyksund | NB1070 | General Cargo | |
| Northern Osprey III | NB1069 | Fishing / Aqualculture | |
| Sayan Polaris | NB1068 | Offshore Vessel | |
| Granit | NB1067 | Fishing / Aqualculture | |
| Svend C | NB1066 | Fishing / Aqualculture | |
| Sólberg Óf 1 | NB1065 | Fishing / Aqualculture | |
| Hans A Bakka | NB1064 | General Cargo | |
| Volstad Oceanic | NB1063 | Offshore Vessel | |
| Mark | NB1062 | Fishing / Aqualculture | |
| Kirkella | NB1061 | Fishing / Aqualculture | |
| Pechora | NB1060 | Fishing / Aqualculture | |
| Leinebris | NB1059 | Fishing / Aqualculture | |
| Nabucco | NB1056 | Tanker | |
| Traviata | NB1055 | Tanker | |
| Othello | NB1054 | Tanker | |
| Fidelio | NB1053 | Tanker | |
| M Solhaug | NB1052 | Fishing / Aqualculture | |
| Quo Vadis | NB1051 | Fishing / Aqualculture | |
| Tersan 4 | NB1026 | Other Vessel | |
| Sanmar Floating Dock | NB1024 | Other Vessel | |
| Andenesfisk I | NB1022 | Fishing / Aqualculture | |
| Sayan Princess | NB1021 | Offshore Vessel | |
| Volstad | NB1020 | Fishing / Aqualculture | |
| Atlantic Viking | NB1019 | Fishing / Aqualculture | |
| Dalga | NB1018 | Passenger Vessel | |
| Safak | NB1017 | Passenger Vessel | |
| Havstrand | NB1016 | Fishing / Aqualculture | |
| Havbryn | NB1015 | Fishing / Aqualculture | |
| Khazri | NB1014 | Passenger Vessel | |
| Grand Canyon | NB1012 | Offshore Vessel | |
| Høydal | NB1011 | General Cargo | |
| Frøyanes | NB1010 | Fishing / Aqualculture | |
| Kurtarma 8 | NB1009 | Other Vessel | |
| Kurtarma 7 | NB1008 | Other Vessel | |
| Kurtarma 10 | NB1007 | Other Vessel | |
| Kurtarma 9 | NB1006 | Other Vessel | |
| Sabret | NB1005 | Passenger Vessel | |
| Affet | NB1004 | Passenger Vessel | |
| Şükret | NB1003 | Passenger Vessel | |
| Norsul 14 | NB1002 | Offshore Vessel | |
| Norsul Rio | NB1001 | Other Vessel | |
| Selenka | NB024 | Tanker | |
| Manas | NB023 | Tanker | |
| Hulin | NB022 | Tanker | |
| Cesteni | NB021 | Tanker | |
| Basat | NB020 | Tanker | |
| Askara | NB019 | Tanker | |
| Alangova | NB018 | Tanker | |
| Lascaux | NB017 | Tanker | |
| Ls Eva | NB016 | Tanker | |
| Lacanau | NB015 | Tanker | |
| Lamentin | NB014 | Tanker | |
| Baku | NB013 | Tanker | |
| Lenkaran | NB012 | Tanker | |
| Chingiz Mustafayev | NB011 | Tanker | |
| Azeri Karabakh | NB010 | Tanker | |
| Dahi Byulbyul | NB009 | Tanker | |
| General Hazi Aslanov | NB008 | Tanker | |
| Armada Navigator | NB007 | Tanker | |
| Armada Trader | NB006 | Tanker | |
| Fariz Ismailkhanov | NB005 | Tanker | |
| Armada Leader | NB004 | Tanker | |
| Notos | NB003 | General Cargo | |
