= Herøy Municipality (Møre og Romsdal) =

Municipality in Møre og Romsdal, Norway

Herøy Municipality Herøy kommune
- Municipality
- Herø herred (historic name)
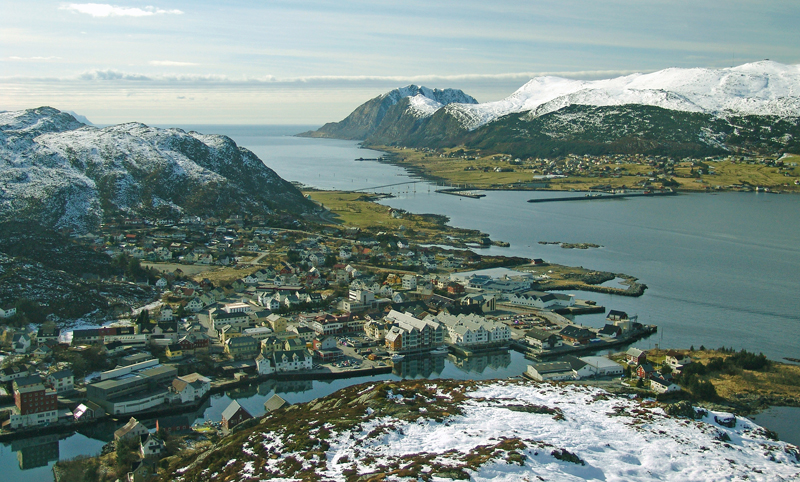
- View of Fosnavåg

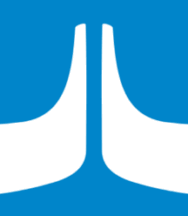
- Flag Coat of arms

- Møre og Romsdal within Norway

- Herøy within Møre og Romsdal
- Coordinates: 62°21′20″N 05°32′40″E
- Country: Norway
- County: Møre og Romsdal
- District: Sunnmøre
- Established: 1 Jan 1838
  - Created as: Formannskapsdistrikt
- Administrative centre: Fosnavåg

Government
  - Mayor (2023): Tine Storøy (H)

Area
  - Total: 119.53 km^{2} (46.15 sq mi)
  - Land: 118.03 km^{2} (45.57 sq mi)
  - Water: 1.5 km^{2} (0.58 sq mi) 1.3%
  - Rank: #321 in Norway
- Highest elevation: 660.19 m (2,166.0 ft)

Population (2024)
  - Total: 8,968
  - Rank: #123 in Norway
  - Density: 75/km^{2} (190/sq mi)
  - Change (10 years): ▲ +1.4%
- Demonym: Herøyværing

Official language
  - Norwegian form: Nynorsk
- Time zone: UTC+01:00 (CET)
  - Summer (DST): UTC+02:00 (CEST)
- ISO 3166 code: NO-1515
- Website: Official website

Herøy is a municipality in Møre og Romsdal county, Norway. It is part of the Sunnmøre region. The administrative centre is the town of Fosnavåg on the island of Bergsøya. Other settlements in Herøy include the villages of Leikong, Kvalsund, and Moltustranda. The industrial area of Eggesbønes is located south of Fosnavåg on the same island. The Runde Environmental Centre is located in the northern part of the municipality on Runde island.

The 119.53-square-kilometre (46.15 sq mi) municipality is the 321st largest by area out of the 357 municipalities in Norway. Herøy Municipality is the 123rd most populous municipality in Norway with a population of 8,968. The municipality's population density is 75 inhabitants per square kilometre (190/sq mi) and its population has increased by 1.4% over the previous 10-year period.

== General information ==
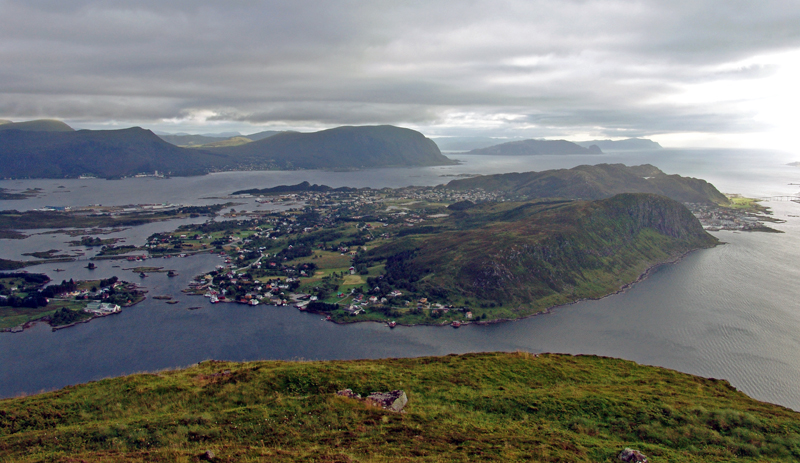
The main island of Bergsøy

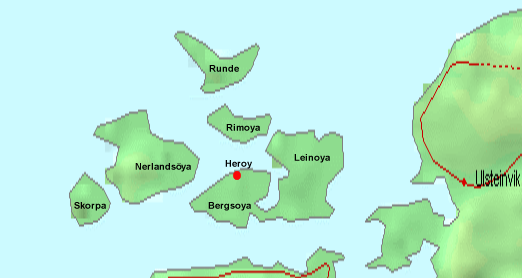
Map of the main islands of Herøy

The prestegjeld (parish) of Herøy was established as a municipality on 1 January 1838 (see formannskapsdistrikt law). On 1 January 1867, the western district of Herøy was separated to become the new Sande Municipality. This left Herøy Municipality with 1,999 residents. On 1 January 1873, an area of Sande Municipality (population: 362) was transferred back to Herøy Municipality. On 1 January 1889, the Eiksund area and Ekø island (population: 119) were transferred from Sande Municipality to Herøy Municipality.

During the 1960s, there were many municipal mergers across Norway due to the work of the Schei Committee. On 1 January 1964, three farms in the Gurskedalen valley (population: 25) were transferred from Herøy Municipality to Sande Municipality. Also on that date, the Eiksund area and the Eika island (population: 222) were transferred from Herøy Municipality to neighboring Ulstein Municipality.

=== Name ===
The municipality (originally the parish) is named after an archipelago of small islands (Old Norse: Herøyjar). The first element is herr which means "army". The word here is referring to the idea of skipaherr which means "military fleet", referring to the many islands grouped together. The last element is øy which means "island". Historically, the name of the municipality was spelled Herø. On 3 November 1917, a royal resolution changed the spelling of the name of the municipality to Herøy.

=== Coat of arms ===
The coat of arms was granted on 27 March 1987. The official blazon is "Azure, two ship bows argent issuant from the flanks" (Norwegian: På blå grunn to motstilte sølv skipsstamnar). This means the arms have a blue field (background) and the charge is two stems of a ship. The charge has a tincture of argent which means it is commonly colored white, but if it is made out of metal, then silver is used. This design was chosen to represent the 7th century Kvalsund boats found in the municipality. The arms were designed by Even Jarl Skoglund. The municipal flag has the same design as the coat of arms.

=== Churches ===
The Church of Norway has three parishes (sokn) within Herøy Municipality. It is part of the Søre Sunnmøre prosti (deanery) in the Diocese of Møre.

Churches in Herøy Municipality
Parish (sokn)	Church name	Location of the church	Year built
Herøy	Herøy Church	Fosnavåg	2003
Indre Herøy	Indre Herøy Church	Stokksund on Gurskøya	1916
Leikanger	Leikanger Church	Leikong	1807

== Government ==
Herøy Municipality is responsible for primary education (through 10th grade), outpatient health services, senior citizen services, welfare and other social services, zoning, economic development, and municipal roads and utilities. The municipality is governed by a municipal council of directly elected representatives. The mayor is indirectly elected by a vote of the municipal council. The municipality is under the jurisdiction of the Sunnmøre District Court and the Frostating Court of Appeal.

=== Municipal council ===
The municipal council (Kommunestyre) of Herøy Municipality is made up of 33 representatives that are elected to four year terms. The tables below show the current and historical composition of the council by political party.

Herøy kommunestyre 2023–2027
Party name (in Nynorsk)	Number of representatives
Labour Party (Arbeidarpartiet)	4
Progress Party (Framstegspartiet)	7
Conservative Party (Høgre)	8
Industry and Business Party (Industri‑ og Næringspartiet)	3
Christian Democratic Party (Kristeleg Folkeparti)	6
People's list (Folkelista)	5
Total number of members:	33

Herøy kommunestyre 2019–2023
Party name (in Nynorsk)	Number of representatives
Labour Party (Arbeidarpartiet)	7
Progress Party (Framstegspartiet)	3
Conservative Party (Høgre)	10
Christian Democratic Party (Kristeleg Folkeparti)	6
Centre Party (Senterpartiet)	3
People's list (Folkelista)	4
Total number of members:	33

Herøy kommunestyre 2015–2019
Party name (in Nynorsk)	Number of representatives
Labour Party (Arbeidarpartiet)	10
Progress Party (Framstegspartiet)	3
Conservative Party (Høgre)	11
Christian Democratic Party (Kristeleg Folkeparti)	4
Liberal Party (Venstre)	1
Local List(s) (Lokale lister)	4
Total number of members:	33

Herøy kommunestyre 2011–2015
Party name (in Nynorsk)	Number of representatives
Labour Party (Arbeidarpartiet)	6
Progress Party (Framstegspartiet)	3
Conservative Party (Høgre)	15
Christian Democratic Party (Kristeleg Folkeparti)	5
Liberal Party (Venstre)	1
Local List(s) (Lokale lister)	3
Total number of members:	33

Herøy kommunestyre 2007–2011
Party name (in Nynorsk)	Number of representatives
Labour Party (Arbeidarpartiet)	5
Progress Party (Framstegspartiet)	4
Conservative Party (Høgre)	14
Christian Democratic Party (Kristeleg Folkeparti)	5
Liberal Party (Venstre)	1
People's list - cross-party list for village and town (Folkelista – tverrpolitisk liste for bygd og by)	4
Total number of members:	33

Herøy kommunestyre 2003–2007
Party name (in Nynorsk)	Number of representatives
Labour Party (Arbeidarpartiet)	7
Progress Party (Framstegspartiet)	3
Conservative Party (Høgre)	4
Christian Democratic Party (Kristeleg Folkeparti)	3
Socialist Left Party (Sosialistisk Venstreparti)	1
Liberal Party (Venstre)	1
People's list - cross-party list (Folkelista - Tverrpolitisk liste)	6
Total number of members:	25

Herøy kommunestyre 1999–2003
Party name (in Nynorsk)	Number of representatives
Labour Party (Arbeidarpartiet)	11
Progress Party (Framstegspartiet)	3
Conservative Party (Høgre)	5
Christian Democratic Party (Kristeleg Folkeparti)	8
Centre Party (Senterpartiet)	1
Socialist Left Party (Sosialistisk Venstreparti)	1
Liberal Party (Venstre)	4
Total number of members:	33

Herøy kommunestyre 1995–1999
Party name (in Nynorsk)	Number of representatives
Labour Party (Arbeidarpartiet)	8
Progress Party (Framstegspartiet)	2
Conservative Party (Høgre)	5
Christian Democratic Party (Kristeleg Folkeparti)	6
Centre Party (Senterpartiet)	3
Socialist Left Party (Sosialistisk Venstreparti)	1
Liberal Party (Venstre)	5
Herøy List (Herøylista)	3
Total number of members:	33

Herøy kommunestyre 1991–1995
Party name (in Nynorsk)	Number of representatives
Labour Party (Arbeidarpartiet)	9
Progress Party (Framstegspartiet)	2
Conservative Party (Høgre)	5
Christian Democratic Party (Kristeleg Folkeparti)	7
Centre Party (Senterpartiet)	3
Socialist Left Party (Sosialistisk Venstreparti)	2
Liberal Party (Venstre)	2
Herøy List (Herøylista)	3
Total number of members:	33

Herøy kommunestyre 1987–1991
Party name (in Nynorsk)	Number of representatives
Labour Party (Arbeidarpartiet)	8
Conservative Party (Høgre)	7
Christian Democratic Party (Kristeleg Folkeparti)	8
Centre Party (Senterpartiet)	2
Liberal Party (Venstre)	3
Herøy List cross-party election list (Herøylista Tverrpolitiske valliste)	5
Total number of members:	33

Herøy kommunestyre 1983–1987
Party name (in Nynorsk)	Number of representatives
Labour Party (Arbeidarpartiet)	8
Conservative Party (Høgre)	8
Christian Democratic Party (Kristeleg Folkeparti)	10
Centre Party (Senterpartiet)	3
Liberal Party (Venstre)	4
Total number of members:	33

Herøy kommunestyre 1979–1983
Party name (in Nynorsk)	Number of representatives
Labour Party (Arbeidarpartiet)	6
Conservative Party (Høgre)	10
Christian Democratic Party (Kristeleg Folkeparti)	9
Centre Party (Senterpartiet)	3
Liberal Party (Venstre)	5
Total number of members:	33

Herøy kommunestyre 1975–1979
Party name (in Nynorsk)	Number of representatives
Labour Party (Arbeidarpartiet)	8
Conservative Party (Høgre)	3
Christian Democratic Party (Kristeleg Folkeparti)	10
Centre Party (Senterpartiet)	4
Liberal Party (Venstre)	5
Liberal People's Party and Independents (Det Nye Folkepartiet og Upolitiske)	1
Non-party list for Moltustranda, Sandvik, Notøy, and Flåvær (Upolitisk liste for Moltustranda, Sandvik, Notøy og Flåvær)	2
Total number of members:	33

Herøy kommunestyre 1971–1975
Party name (in Nynorsk)	Number of representatives
Labour Party (Arbeidarpartiet)	8
Conservative Party (Høgre)	2
Christian Democratic Party (Kristeleg Folkeparti)	9
Centre Party (Senterpartiet)	5
Liberal Party (Venstre)	7
Local List(s) (Lokale lister)	2
Total number of members:	33

Herøy kommunestyre 1967–1971
Party name (in Nynorsk)	Number of representatives
Labour Party (Arbeidarpartiet)	8
Conservative Party (Høgre)	3
Christian Democratic Party (Kristeleg Folkeparti)	11
Centre Party (Senterpartiet)	4
Liberal Party (Venstre)	7
Total number of members:	33

Herøy kommunestyre 1963–1967
Party name (in Nynorsk)	Number of representatives
Labour Party (Arbeidarpartiet)	4
Local List(s) (Lokale lister)	29
Total number of members:	33

Herøy heradsstyre 1959–1963
Party name (in Nynorsk)	Number of representatives
Labour Party (Arbeidarpartiet)	1
Local List(s) (Lokale lister)	32
Total number of members:	33

Herøy heradsstyre 1955–1959
Party name (in Nynorsk)	Number of representatives
Labour Party (Arbeidarpartiet)	5
Local List(s) (Lokale lister)	28
Total number of members:	33

Herøy heradsstyre 1951–1955
Party name (in Nynorsk)	Number of representatives
Labour Party (Arbeidarpartiet)	1
Local List(s) (Lokale lister)	31
Total number of members:	32

Herøy heradsstyre 1947–1951
Party name (in Nynorsk)	Number of representatives
Local List(s) (Lokale lister)	32
Total number of members:	32

Herøy heradsstyre 1945–1947
Party name (in Nynorsk)	Number of representatives
Labour Party (Arbeidarpartiet)	1
List of workers, fishermen, and small farmholders (Arbeidarar, fiskarar, småbrukarar liste)	2
Local List(s) (Lokale lister)	29
Total number of members:	32

Herøy heradsstyre 1937–1941*
Party name (in Nynorsk)	Number of representatives
Labour Party (Arbeidarpartiet)	5
Joint List(s) of Non-Socialist Parties (Borgarlege Felleslister)	3
Local List(s) (Lokale lister)	24
Total number of members:	32
Note: Due to the German occupation of Norway during World War II, no elections were held for new municipal councils until after the war ended in 1945.

=== Mayors ===
The mayor (Nynorsk: ordførar) of Herøy Municipality is the political leader of the municipality and the chairperson of the municipal council. Here is a list of people who have held this position:

- 1838–1843: Christoffer Mathias Rønneberg
- 1844–1845: Peter Wilhelm L'orange
- 1846–1849: Aage Schavland
- 1850–1851: Knut A. Brekke
- 1852–1853: Knut R. Bjørlykke
- 1854–1857: Aage Schavland
- 1858–1872: Ole Thorseth
- 1873–1876: Peter M. Jacobsen
- 1877–1886: Ole Thorseth (H)
- 1887–1888: Peter M. Jacobsen
- 1889–1892: Annanias Stavøstrand (MV)
- 1893–1894: Gustav Wiig (H)
- 1895–1907: Severin Sundnes (H)
- 1908–1917: Rasmus Moltu (V)
- 1918–1919: Paul Moltu (V)
- 1920–1922: Lars Havåg (V)
- 1923–1931: Abel Berge (V)
- 1932–1934: Hans P.J. Runde
- 1935–1941: Ole Garvik (V)
- 1942–1945: Hjalmar Jacobsen (NS)
- 1945–1947: Ole Garvik (V)
- 1948–1955: Ivar Nærø
- 1956–1958: Bjarne Rekdal (Ap)
- 1958–1959: Olav Thorseth
- 1960–1961: Magnus Berge
- 1962–1971: Rolf Ervik
- 1972–1975: Knut Nærø
- 1976–1979: Einar Leinebø
- 1980–1987: Charles Remø (H)
- 1988–1989: Per Rolf Sævik (KrF)
- 1990–1995: Svein Gjelseth (Ap)
- 1995–1999: Leif G. Igesund (KrF)
- 1999–2003: Svein Gjelseth (Ap)
- 2003–2019: Arnulf Goksøyr (H)
- 2019–2023: Bjørn-Halvor Prytz (Ap)
- 2023–present: Tine Storøy (H)

== Geography ==
The main population and administrative centre of the municipality is the town of Fosnavåg, located on the island of Bergsøya. The municipality is entirely composed of islands located north of the Rovdefjorden. It includes the main islands of Bergsøya, Leinøya, Nerlandsøya, Remøya, Runde, Skorpa, Flåværet, and the eastern part of Gurskøya, plus many smaller islands. The highest point in the municipality is the 660.19-metre (2,166.0 ft) tall mountain Sollia, located on the island of Gurskøya, on the border with Sande Municipality.

The island of Runde is especially notable for its large seabird colonies (and Runde Lighthouse), while Skorpa is famous for its role as a station for the Shetland bus. The islands are connected together via a series of bridges including the Runde Bridge, Remøy Bridge, Herøy Bridge, and Nerlandsøy Bridge.

The Herøyfjorden bisects Herøy Municipality. The half located south of the fjord is referred to as Inner Herøy, while the half located north of the fjord is referred to as Outer Herøy. Inner and Outer Herøy are tied together by the Herøy Bridge which connects the islands of Gurskøya and Leinøya. Along this main route of traffic is the islet Notøy and the even smaller Herøya islet, an old trading station (now museum) and the original location of the original Herøy Church.

Flåværet is a group of islets and skerries in the Herøyfjorden which is the site of a fishing station. It includes the islets Flåvær, Husholmen, Torvholmen and Varholmen. The Flåvær Lighthouse is located on Varholmen. The Svinøy Lighthouse is located on the very small island of Svinøy, about 12 kilometres (7.5 mi) west of the island of Skorpa.

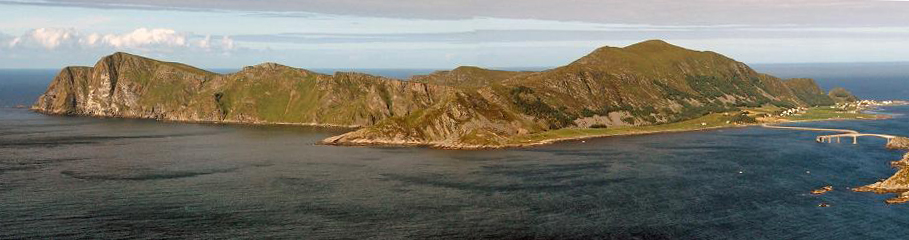
The island of Runde

=== Climate ===
Herøy has a temperate oceanic climate, with mild and windy winters, among the mildest winters in Norway. The weather station at Svinøy Lighthouse has been in operation since June 1955. However, it is located over 10 km from other islands in the municipality, far out in the ocean. Therefore, the winters are warmer and summers are colder than in the rest of the municipality.

Climate data for Svinøy Lighthouse 1991-2020 (38 m, precipitation 1961-90)
Month	Jan	Feb	Mar	Apr	May	Jun	Jul	Aug	Sep	Oct	Nov	Dec	Year
Mean daily maximum °C (°F)	5.9 (42.6)	5.2 (41.4)	5.7 (42.3)	7.6 (45.7)	10 (50)	12.4 (54.3)	15 (59)	15.9 (60.6)	14.2 (57.6)	11.1 (52.0)	8.5 (47.3)	6.6 (43.9)	9.8 (49.7)
Daily mean °C (°F)	4.5 (40.1)	3.7 (38.7)	4.1 (39.4)	5.6 (42.1)	8 (46)	10.6 (51.1)	13.1 (55.6)	14.2 (57.6)	12.6 (54.7)	9.5 (49.1)	7 (45)	5.1 (41.2)	8.2 (46.7)
Mean daily minimum °C (°F)	2.5 (36.5)	1.8 (35.2)	2.2 (36.0)	3.9 (39.0)	6.3 (43.3)	9.2 (48.6)	11.6 (52.9)	12.6 (54.7)	10.7 (51.3)	7.6 (45.7)	5 (41)	3.1 (37.6)	6.4 (43.5)
Average precipitation mm (inches)	61 (2.4)	51 (2.0)	54 (2.1)	42 (1.7)	41 (1.6)	48 (1.9)	61 (2.4)	85 (3.3)	92 (3.6)	90 (3.5)	86 (3.4)	70 (2.8)	781 (30.7)
Source 1: yr.no/Norwegian Meteorological Institute
Source 2: NOAA-WMO averages 91-2020 Norway

== Notable people ==
- Hans Peter L'orange (1835 in Herøy – 1907), a military officer who was the Commanding General in Norway from 1897 to 1903
- Suzannah Ibsen (1836 in Herøy – 1914), the wife of playwright and poet Henrik Ibsen
- Aage Skavlan (1847 in Herøy – 1920), a historian and academic
- Harald Skavlan (1854 in Herøy – 1908), a railroad engineer
- Johannes A. Bøe (1882 at Bøe in Herøy – 1970), a Norwegian politician who was Mayor of Jevnaker Municipality from 1922 to 1925
- Per Rolf Sævik (born 1940 in Herøy), a fisherman, ship-owner, and politician who was Mayor of Herøy from 1987 to 1989
- Synnøve Eriksen (born 1963 in Herøy), a novelist
