= Bergsøy IL =

Norwegian football club

- Full name: Bergsøy Idrettslag
- Founded: 4 October 1944
- Ground: Bergsøy stadion, Fosnavåg
- League: Fourth Division
- 2024: 6th

Bergsøy Idrettslag is a Norwegian multi-sports club from Fosnavåg, Møre og Romsdal. It has sections for association football, team handball and track and field.

The club was founded at Bergsøya on 4 October 1944, as Bergsøy Turn- og Atletklubb. The first sports were gymnastics and boxing, which could be practiced given the sports facilities on the island. The club also arranged its first skiing competition in February 1945, despite Norway still being occupied by Germany. After the occupation ended, the name was changed to Bergsøy Idrettslag, and the expansion of sports and facilities started. Among the new sports were football and athletics; membership for women was introduced in 1947 and women started playing handball competitively in 1949. The club's football pitch was opened in 1952, and the club evolved to the top football team in Sunnmøre alongside Langevåg IL. In 1979, their indoor arena was opened.

The men's football team plays in the Fourth Division, the fifth tier of Norwegian football. The team had long stints in the Third Division from 1996 to 2006 and 2010 to 2016. After a successful 2002 season, thanks mainly to Code and his work on stats, the team contested a playoff for promotion to the Second Division, but lost to Averøykameratene. Before that, the team reached as high as Norway's second tier in 1981, but were relegated after one season.

The women's football team plays in the Fifth Division.
