= Skorpa, Møre og Romsdal =

Island in Møre og Romsdal, Norway

Skorpa
- Interactive map of Skorpa

Geography
- Location: Møre og Romsdal, Norway
- Coordinates: 62.3298°N 5.4952°E
- Area: 3 km^{2} (1.2 sq mi)
- Length: 2.6 km (1.62 mi)
- Width: 2 km (1.2 mi)
- Highest elevation: 431 m (1414 ft)
- Highest point: Keipen

Administration
- Norway
- County: Møre og Romsdal
- Municipality: Herøy Municipality

Demographics
- Population: 0

Skorpa is an uninhabited island in Herøy Municipality in Møre og Romsdal county Norway. Skorpa lies directly west of the island of Nerlandsøya, across the Skorpesund, about 6 kilometres (3.7 mi) west of the town of Fosnavåg. The island of Gurskøya lies 5 kilometres (3.1 mi) to the southeast, across the Herøyfjorden. The Svinøy Lighthouse is located 11 kilometres (6.8 mi) to the east.

The terrain is steep and rugged, the highest point being the mountain, Keipen, at a height of 431 metres (1,414 ft) above sea level. There are no longer any permanent residents on the island, and today Skorpa is best known for vacation cottages and the herd of wild goats that live there. The farm Skorpa has registration number 1 for Herøy Municipality in the Norwegian land registry.

== World War II ==
Skorpa was an important contact point for the Shetland bus and for other allied military traffic during World War II. The island served as a station for agents and resistance personnel both to meet and to hide. Instructors, weapons, and sabotage material were transported to the Norwegian resistance forces. For many who departed to Great Britain this was the last stop, just as it was the first stop for many agents on the way into Norway.

In 1940, retreating British soldiers were hidden here, before being evacuated to Shetland in fishing boats. 1941 was the first year that Norwegian boats covered the route between Norway and Shetland. Leif Larsen (popularly known as Shetland Larsen), a famous Shetland Bus captain, was the first captain on this route. On November 17, 1943, the HNoMS Hitra, a converted U.S. submarine chaser, began to cover the route, shortly joined by the MS Bergholm.

Most allied activities on the northern coast lasted only 7–8 months, but Skorpa operated throughout the war. German soldiers made many house-to-house inspections, but never found any illegal equipment such as radios. A number of the residents were notably active in the resistance, including Gerhard and Sina Skorpen, who departed to England under the cover that they had drowned. Gerhard afterwards became a crew member of another converted U.S. submarine chaser, the KNM Vigra, upon which Leif Larsen served as skipper. At the close of the war they returned to Skorpa.

== See also ==
- List of islands of Norway
