= Herøy Church =

Church in Møre og Romsdal, Norway

- Herøy kyrkje
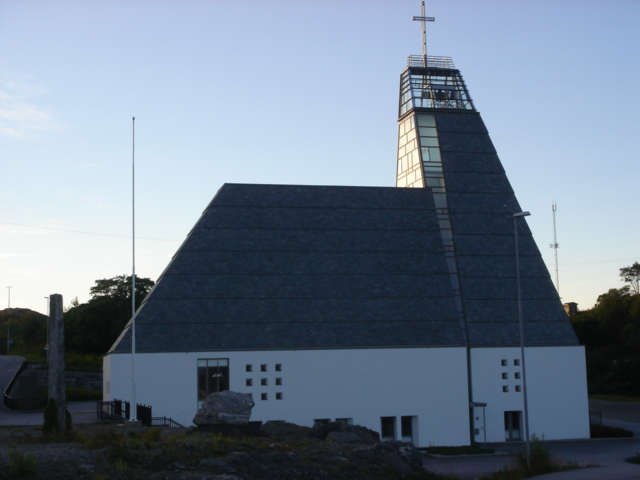
- View of the church
- Herøy Church
- 62°20′07″N 5°38′11″E
- Location: Herøy, Møre og Romsdal
- Country: Norway
- Denomination: Church of Norway
- Churchmanship: Evangelical Lutheran

History
- Status: Parish church
- Founded: 12th century
- Consecrated: 2002

Architecture
- Functional status: Active
- Architect(s): Kine Tambs and Hans Petter Madsø
- Architectural type: Rectangular
- Completed: 2002 (24 years ago)

Specifications
- Capacity: 700
- Materials: Concrete

Administration
- Diocese: Møre bispedømme
- Deanery: Søre Sunnmøre prosti
- Parish: Herøy
- Norwegian Cultural Heritage Site
- Type: Church
- Status: Not protected
- ID: 145576

Herøy Church (Norwegian: Herøy kyrkje) is a parish church of the Church of Norway in Herøy Municipality in Møre og Romsdal county, Norway. It is located in the town of Fosnavåg, on the island of Bergsøya. It is the church for the Herøy parish which is part of the Søre Sunnmøre prosti (deanery) in the Diocese of Møre. The white, concrete church was built in a rectangular style in 2002 by the architects Kine Tambs and Hans Petter Madsø from an architecture firm from Trondheim. The church seats about 700 people.

== History ==
The earliest existing historical records of the church date back to 1432 where it was listed in Aslak Bolt's cadastre and there was also mention of the priest from this church in 1385. The first "Herøy Church" was built during the 12th century on the eastern tip of the small island of Herøya, about 3 kilometres (1.9 mi) southeast of the present church. This was a small stone church and it was the main church for all of the outer Sunnmøre area. The church was a long church design that consisted of a nave which measured 22.3 by 8.6 metres (73 ft × 28 ft), plus it had a choir on the south end of the nave.

In 1814, this church served as an election church (Norwegian: valgkirke). Together with more than 300 other parish churches across Norway, it was a polling station for elections to the 1814 Norwegian Constituent Assembly which wrote the Constitution of Norway. This was Norway's first national elections. Each church parish was a constituency that elected people called "electors" who later met together in each county to elect the representatives for the assembly that was to meet at Eidsvoll Manor later that year.

In 1859, the medieval stone church was torn down and it was replaced by a new wooden church located about 80 metres (260 ft) to the west-northwest of the old church site. The foundation of the new church was made out of the old stone from the previous building.

In 1916 the parish was getting large and it was divided so that there would be a church for the outer islands and a church for the inner areas of the municipality. Since the church on Herøya was in the middle, it was decided to close the church on Herøya and build two other churches elsewhere. So, in 1916, a new church was built on the east coast of the island of Gurskøya and this became the Indre Herøy Church. The same year, the old Herøy Church was taken down, moved, and rebuilt in Fosnavåg on the island of Bergsøya. The builder was Ole Havnæs from Ålesund. The church had 550 seats. It was consecrated in 1916. This new Herøy Church was not rebuilt exactly like the old church, but rather it was extended and enlarged too. Many of the interior details were changed as well.

During the night of 26 December 1998 (Boxing Day), Herøy Church burned down. Many works of art and furniture pieces from the Middle Ages were lost in the fire. After the fire, the site was cleared and prepared for the construction of a new church. M. Kristiseter was hired as the building contractor. The parish hired the architectural firm Madsø-Sveen from Trondheim to design the new church. Work on the new building began in January 2002 and it was completed in late 2002. It was consecrated on 16 February 2003 by the Bishop Odd Bondevik. The new church includes about 2,300 square metres (25,000 sq ft) of floor space on its two levels. The main nave is on the upper level and the lower level contains offices and classrooms.

== Media gallery ==
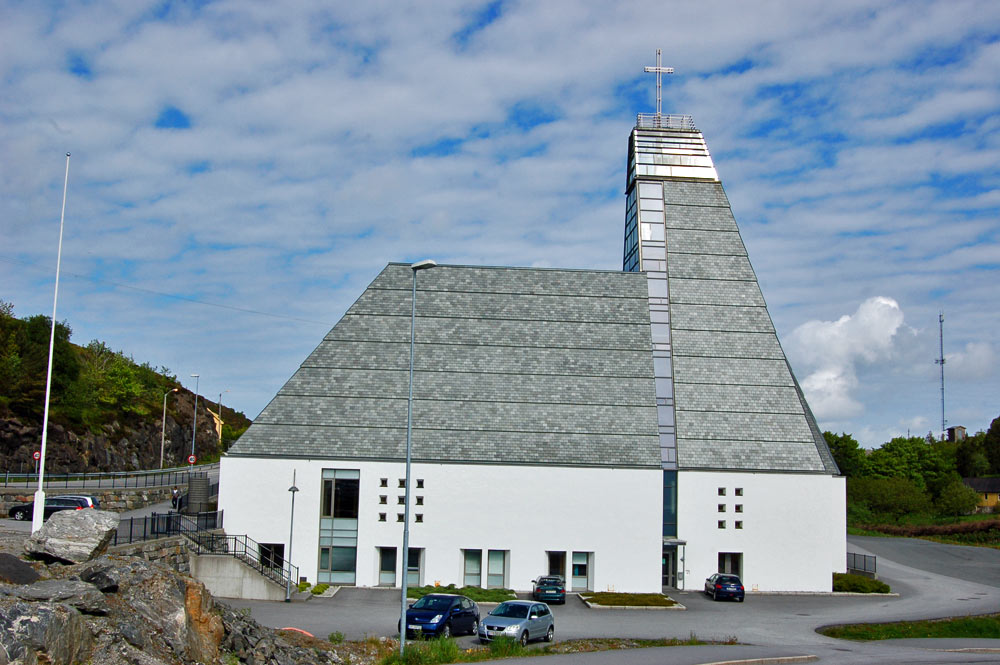
Present church (since 2002)

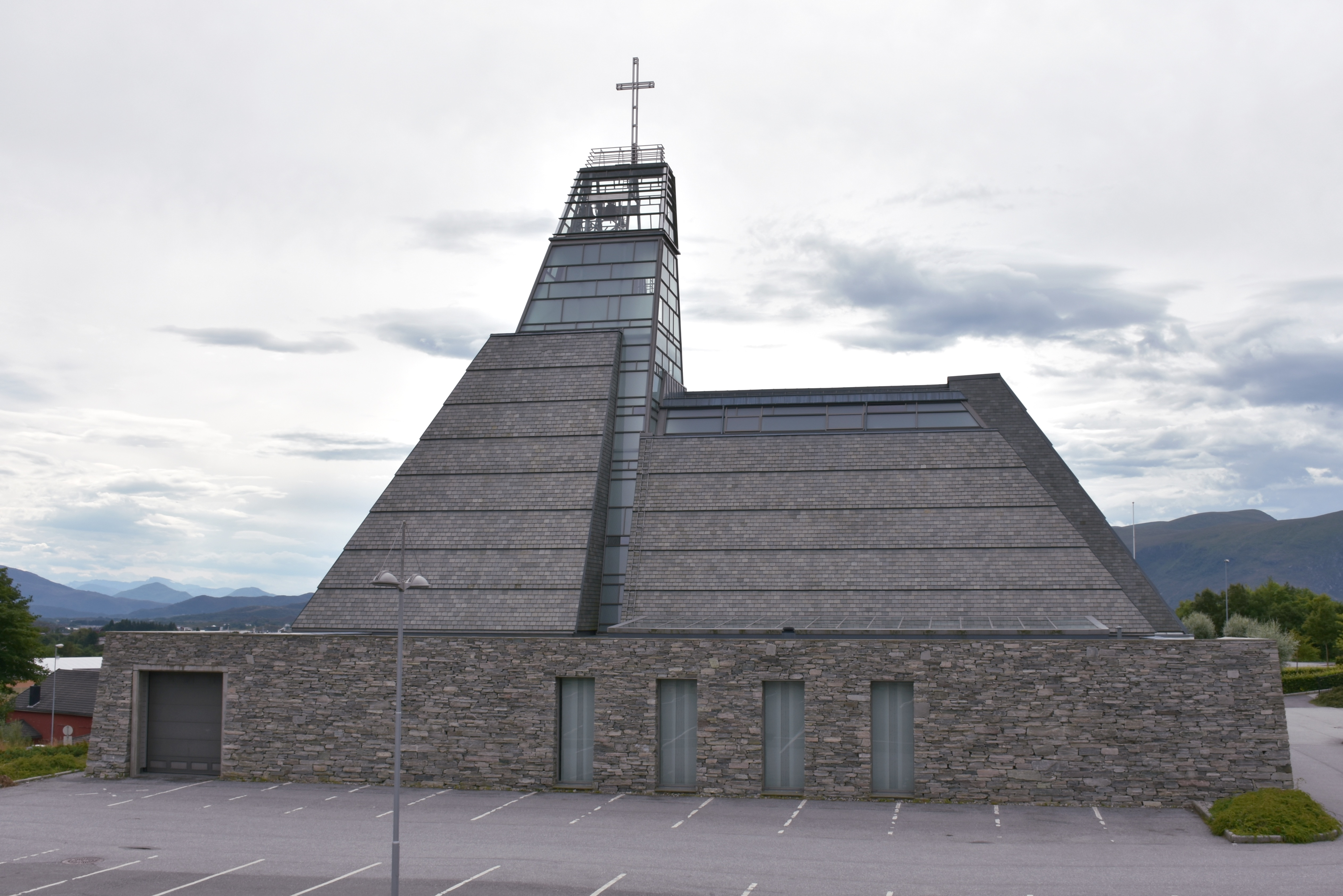
Present church (since 2002)

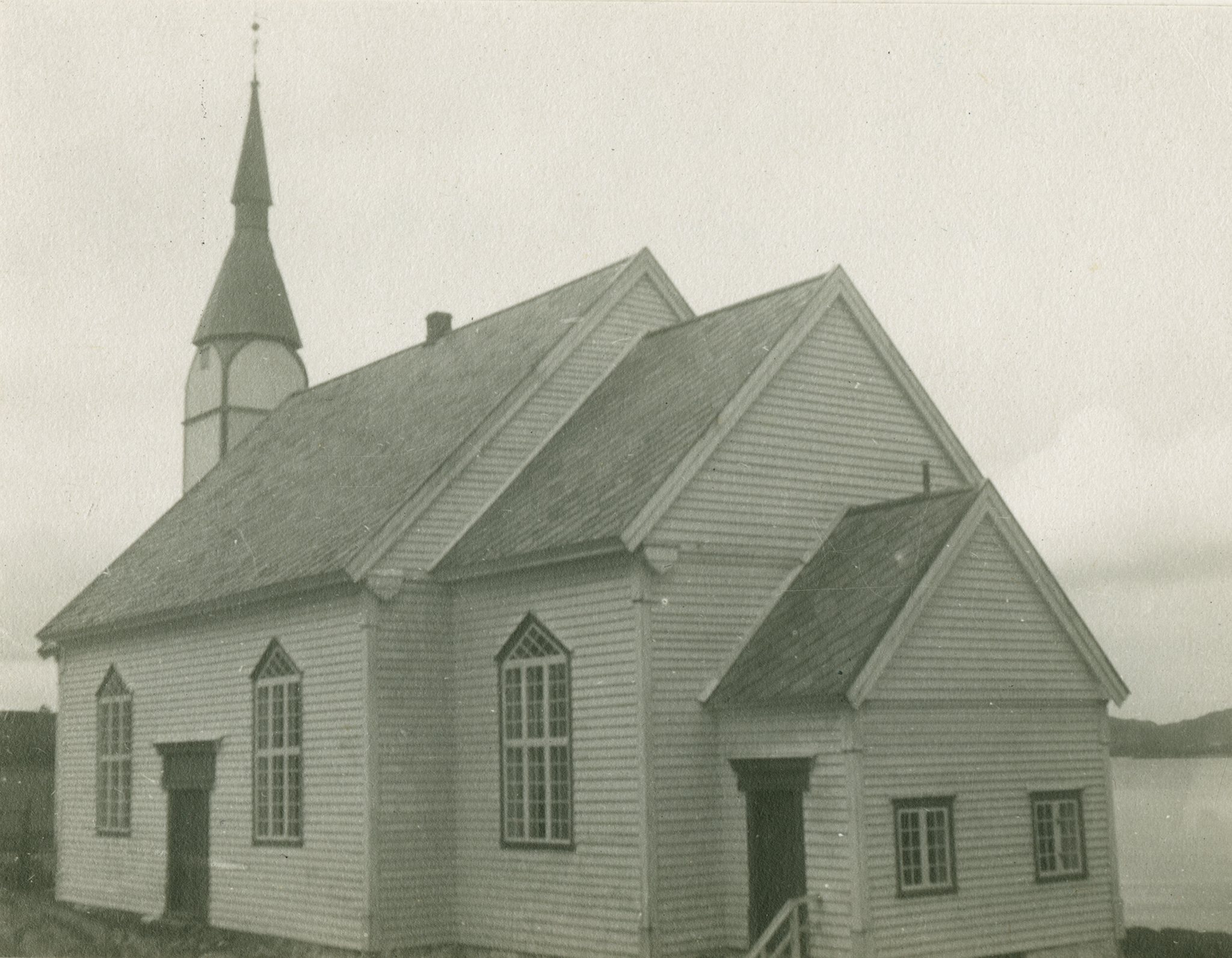
Previous church (1916-1998)

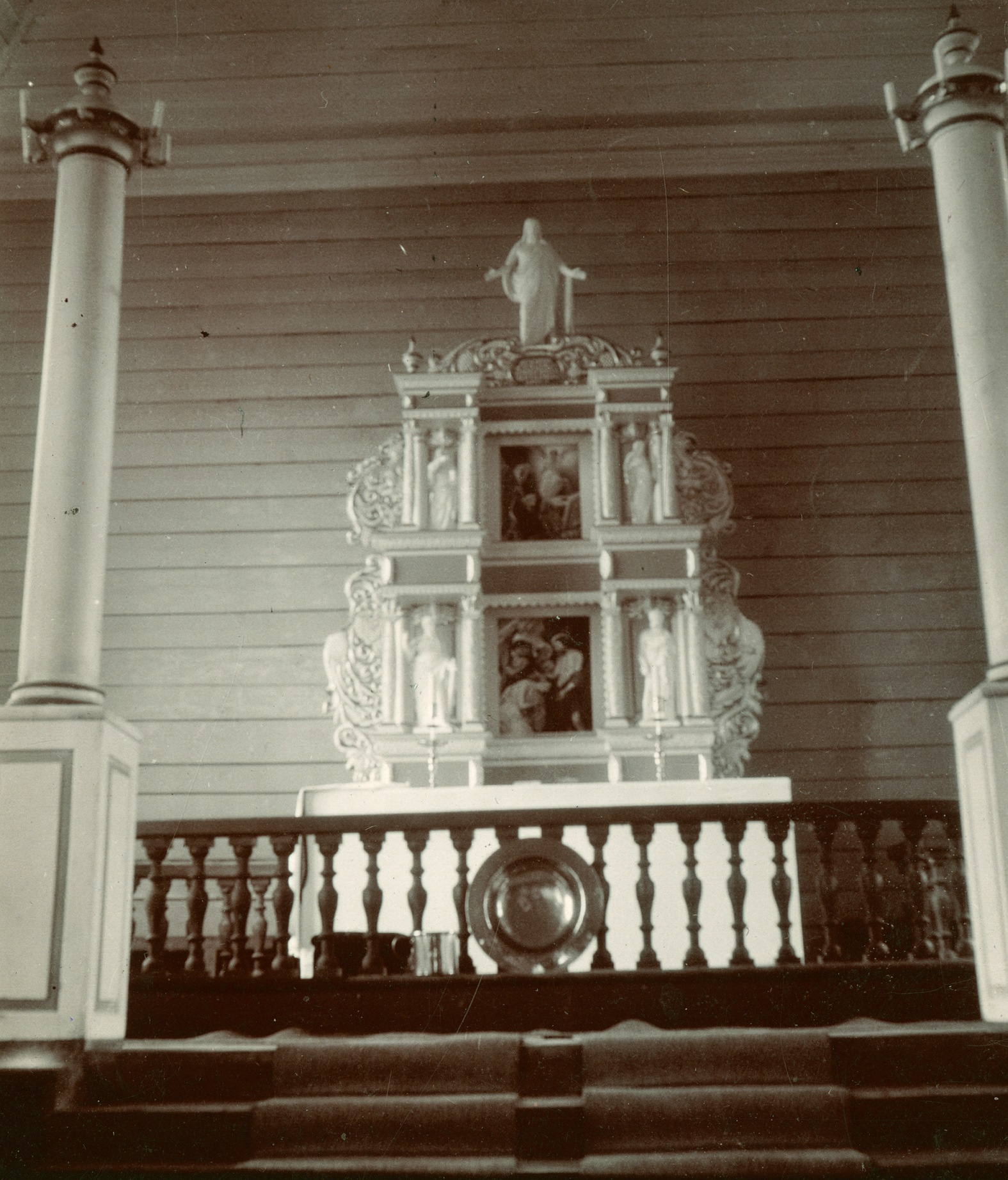
Interior of the previous church (1916-1998)

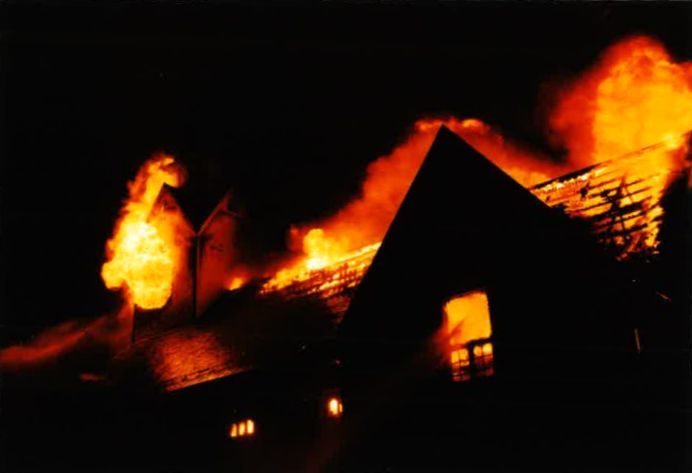
Fire in Herøy Church (26 Dec 1998)

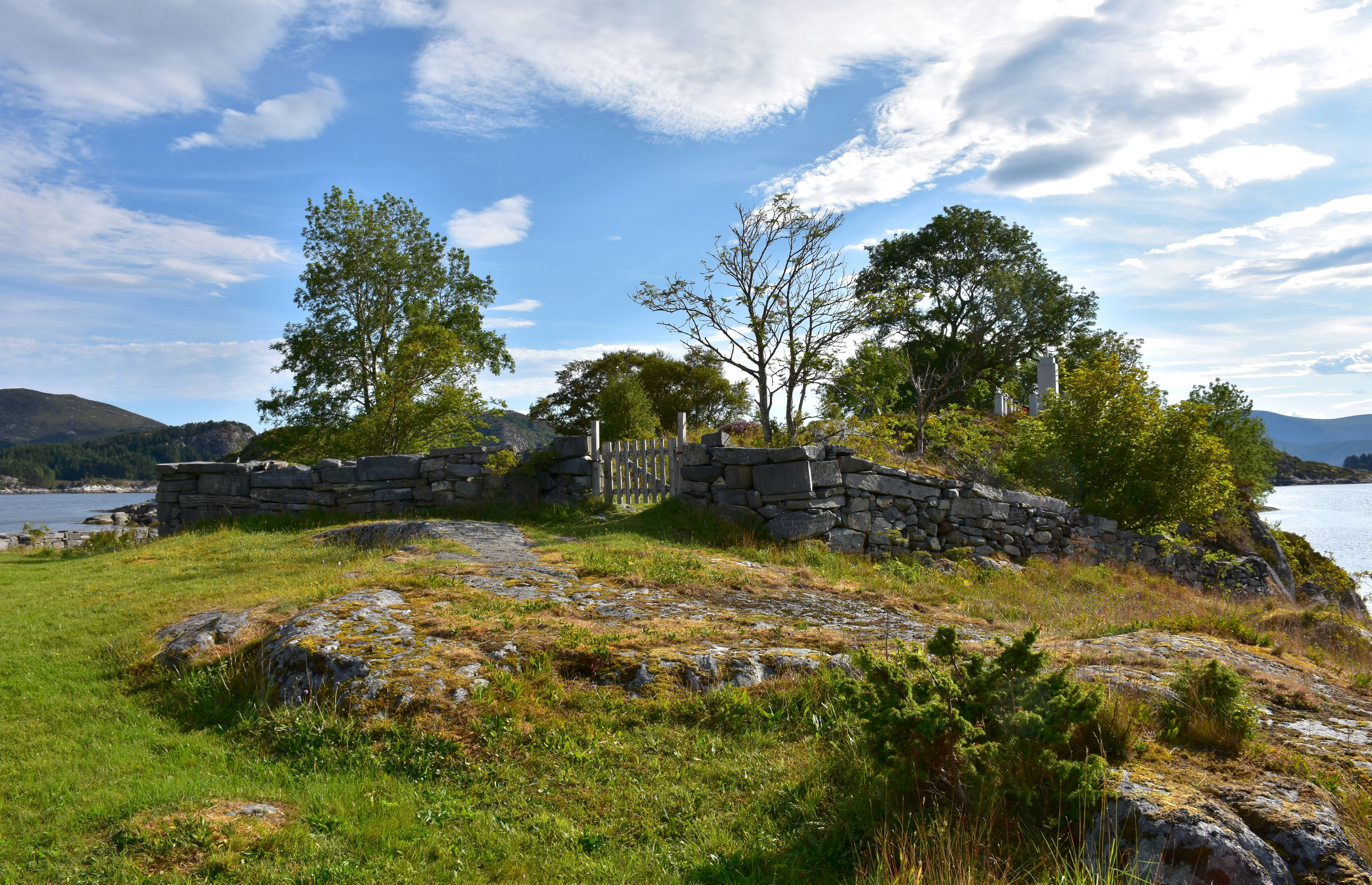
Medieval church site on Herøya

== See also ==
- List of churches in Møre
