= MV Havila Harmony =

Support vessel

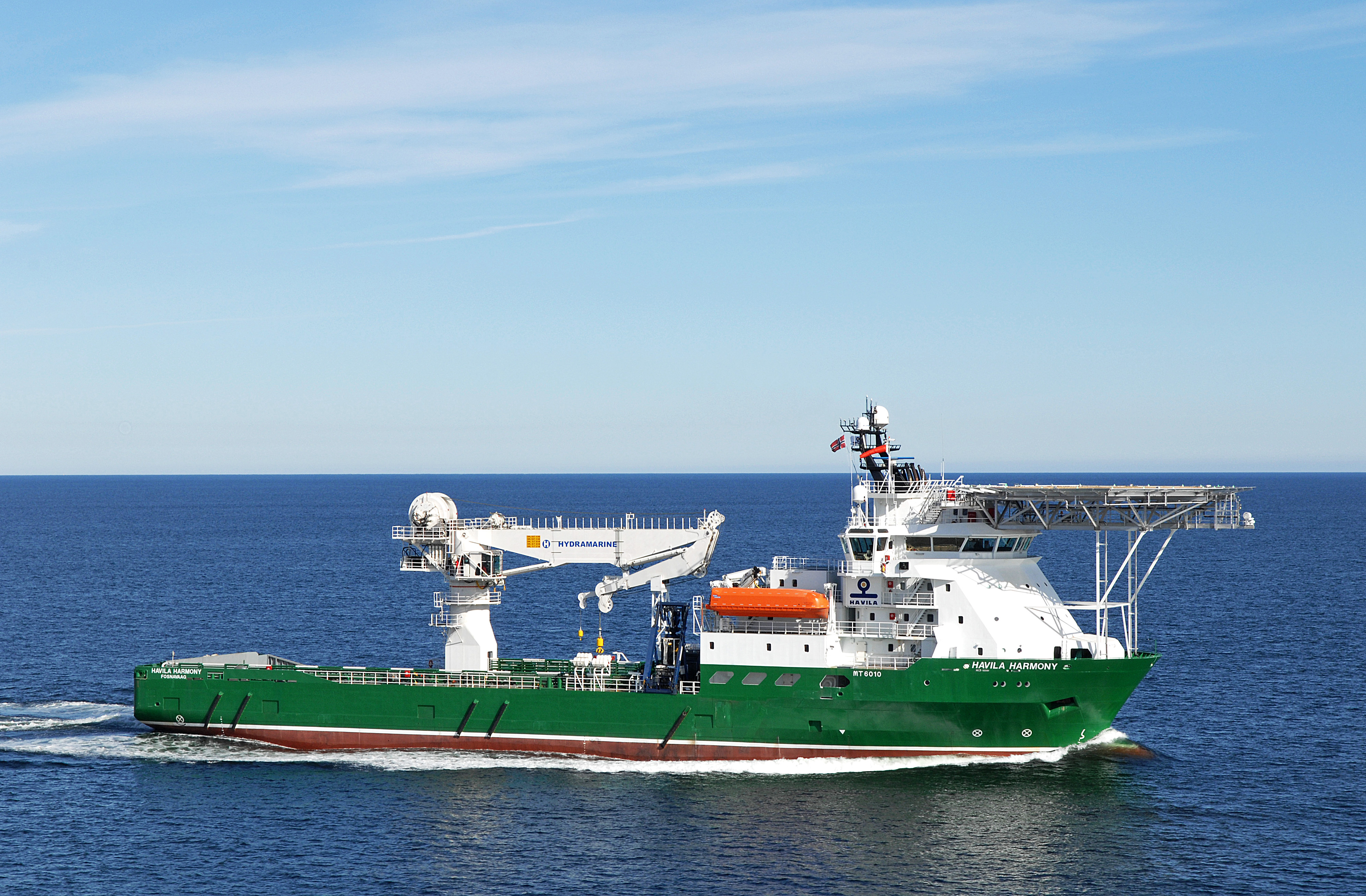
- Name: Havila Harmony
- Owner: Havila Shipping
- Operator: Fugro (through 30 April 2017)
- Port of registry: Labuan, Malaysia
- Builder: Havyard Leirvik
- Completed: 2005
- Identification: Call sign: 9WND9; IMO number: 9343596; MMSI number: 533180003
- Status: In active service

General characteristics
- Type: Multi-role DP2 support vessel
- Tonnage: 4,724 GT
- Length: 92.95
- Beam: 19.70
- Draft: 6.3 (maximum loaded)
- Depth: 7.7
- Installed power: 4 × 1900 kW diesel generator
- Propulsion: 2 × 2600 kW propellers (electric); 2 × 1000 kW thrusters (electric)
- Speed: 13.5 knots (max cruising)
- Capacity: 88 persons

MV Havila Harmony is a multi-role, dynamically-positioned support vessel built in 2005 for subsea construction and support operations. The vessel is owned by Havila Shipping and currently on long-term charter to Fugro.

== History ==
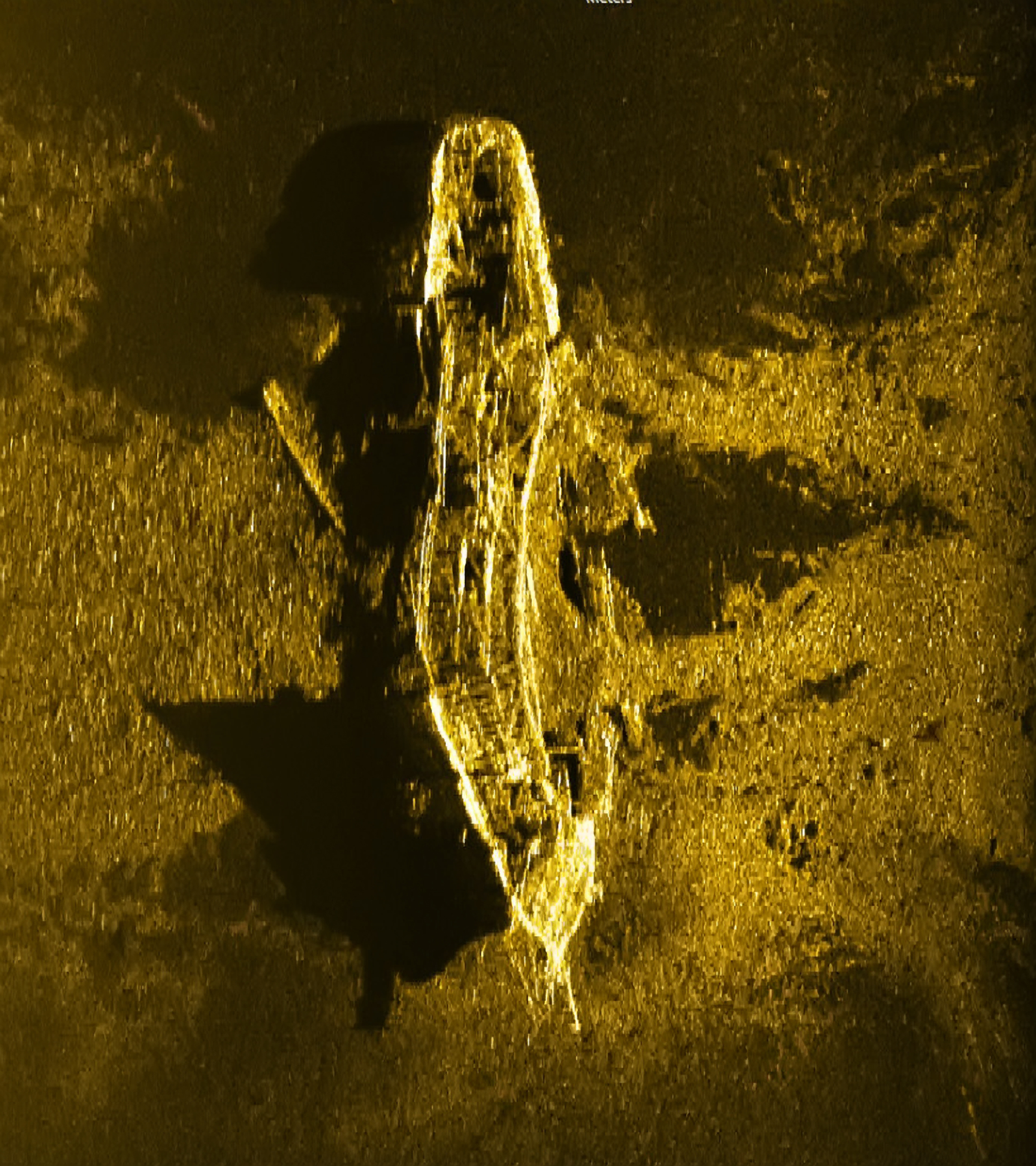
High-resolution sonar image of shipwreck taken by AUV deployed by the Havila Harmony

The Havila Harmony was built by Havyard Leirvik and delivered in June 2005 to Havila Shipping. It was originally registered in Fosnavåg, Norway. In 2013, Fugro extended a long-term charter of the vessel, then operating in Malaysia, until 30 April 2017 with two optional one-year extensions.

The Havila Harmony was involved in the search for Malaysia Airlines Flight 370. Havila Harmony was outfitted with a Hugin 4500 autonomous underwater vehicle at the Australia Maritime Complex near Perth, Western Australia in November 2015. It arrived in the search area on 5 December 2015. The AUV aboard Havila Harmony was used to search the most challenging underwater terrain, which could not effectively be searched by the towed sonar used by other vessels in the search. On 2 January 2016, the AUV aboard Havila Harmony was used to investigate an anomalous, possibly-man-made seafloor feature; high-resolution sonar imagery from the AUV revealed the feature was a shipwreck, probably an iron or steel vessel from the turn of the 19th century.

== Specifications and equipment ==
The Havila Harmony is based on a Marin Teknikk MT6010 hull. It was built in 2005 and configured to its current configuration in 2007. It has a maximum speed of 13.5 knots (25.0 km/h; 15.5 mph), although the maximum economical speed is 11.5 knots (21.3 km/h; 13.2 mph). The vessel was designed for subsea construction operations and support of subsea operations.

The Havila Harmony has 800 square metres (8,600 sq ft) of deck space and is equipped with an offshore crane, which can lift a maximum 100 tons (single fall) or 150 tons (double block). A helicopter deck above the bow is capable of operating a Eurocopter AS332 Super Puma or similarly-sized helicopter. Additionally, the vessel is outfitted with two Remotely operated underwater vehicles (ROVs), which are rated to 3,000 metres (9,800 ft) maximum operating depth. During the search for Malaysia Airlines Flight 370, it was equipped with a Hugin 4500 AUV.
