= Nerlandsøya =

Island in Møre og Romsdal, Norway

- Interactive map of Nerlandsøya

Geography
- Location: Møre og Romsdal, Norway
- Coordinates: 62.3333°N 5.5376°E
- Area: 14.6 km^{2} (5.6 sq mi)
- Length: 4.3 km (2.67 mi)
- Width: 4.8 km (2.98 mi)
- Highest elevation: 430 m (1410 ft)
- Highest point: Storevarden

Administration
- Norway
- County: Møre og Romsdal
- Municipality: Herøy Municipality

Demographics
- Population: 888 (2015)

Nerlandsøya is an island in Herøy Municipality in Møre og Romsdal county, Norway. The island is located northwest of the town of Fosnavåg and east of the island of Skorpa. The island is connected to the island Bergsøya (to the southeast) by the Nerlandsøy Bridge. The Flåværet islands lie to the south. The highest point on the island is Storevarden which is 430 metres (1,410 ft) above sea level. The island has an area of 14.6 square kilometres (5.6 sq mi). In 2015, there were 888 residents living on the island. The largest village on the island is Kvalsund.

== See also ==
- List of islands of Norway
