= Havila Neptune =

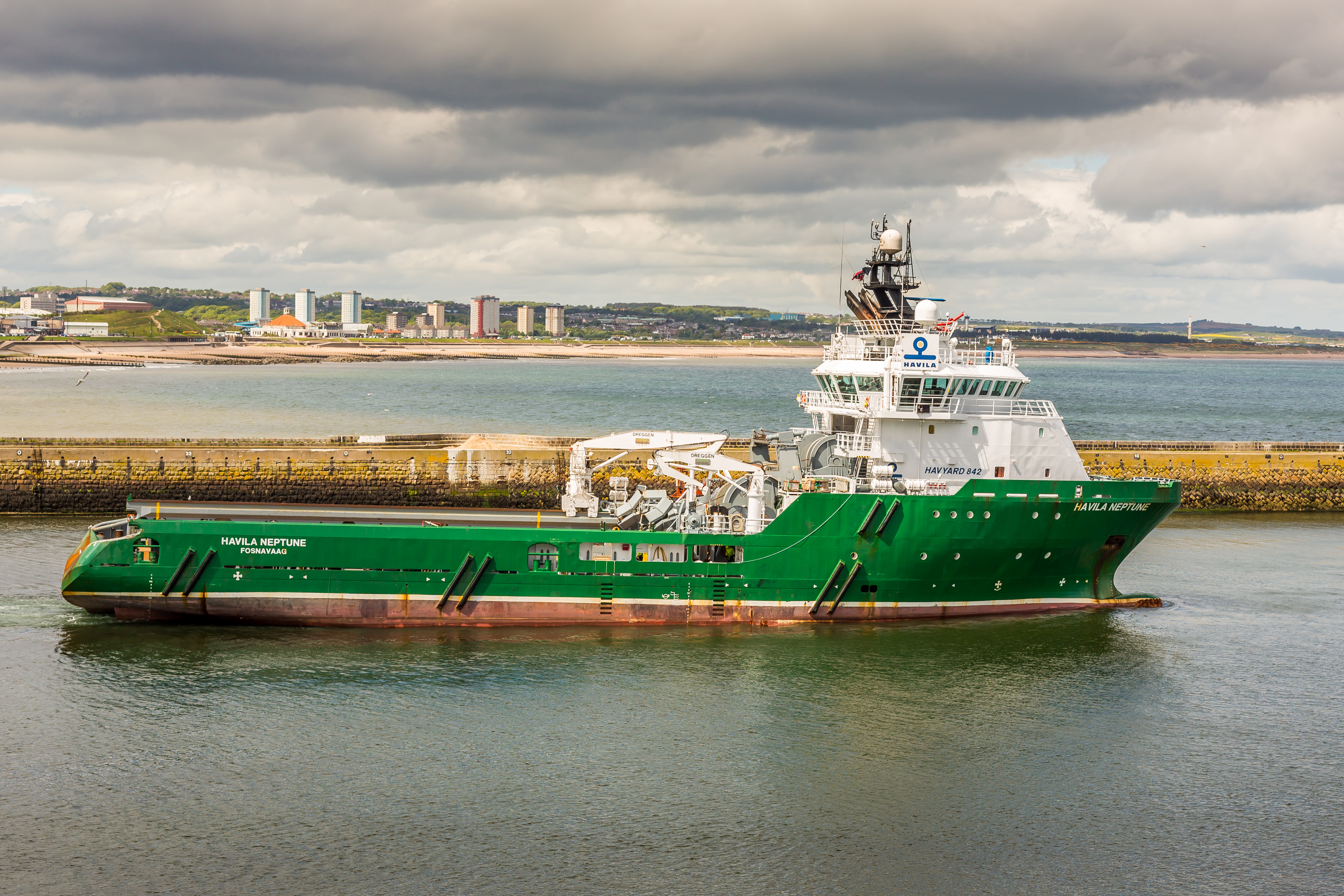

History
- Name: Havila Neptune
- Owner: Havila Shipping ASA
- Port of registry: Fosnavåg, Norway
- Route: Angola
- Builder: Havyard Leirvik shipyards in Leirvik, Norway
- Yard number: 94
- Launched: 9 August 2007
- Completed: 19 April 2008
- Identification: IMO number: 9393400; MMSI number: 235086758; Callsign: LACN
- Status: in active service

General characteristics
- Class & type: Anchor handling/tugboat/supply vessel
- Tonnage: 2789 GT
- Length: 74.50 m (244 ft) overall
- Beam: 16 m (52 ft)
- Installed power: 2 × MAK 12VM32C diesel engines (6,000 kW or 8,000 hp each); , 2 × Cat (601 kW or 806 hp each)
- Propulsion: 2 × Kamewa; 2 × 900 kW Kamewa bow thrusters; 1 × 1500 kW Kamewa azimuth thruster
- Speed: 15 knots (28 km/h; 17 mph)
- Capacity: 520 m2/ 1100 T

MS Havila Neptune is the second ship built at Havyard Leirvik AS to the Havyard 842 design, and was delivered to the shipping company Havila Shipping ASA on 19 April 2008 as yard number 94. Havila Shipping initially owned 30 percent of the new build, but bought the remaining 70 percent in October 2007 based on a shipping cost of approximately 375,000,000 kr. This Havyard design from Havyard Maritime has also become popular abroad, including in China.
