= Eggesbønes =

Village in Herøy Municipality in Møre og Romsdal, Norway

Eggesbønes Eggesbø
- Village
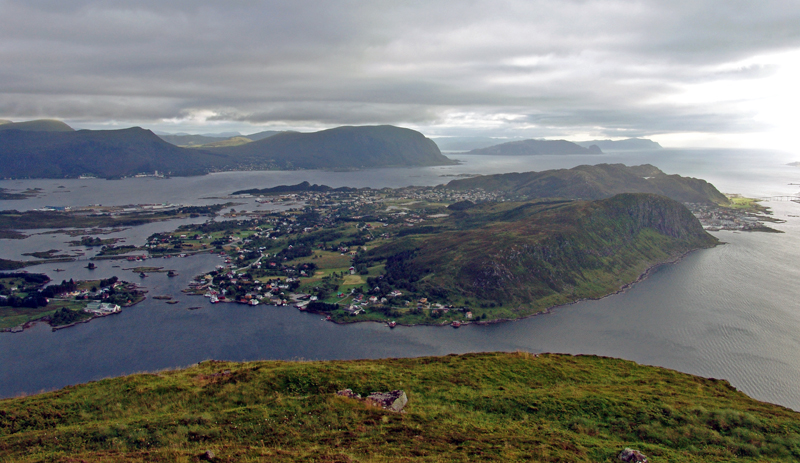
- View of Eggebønes on Bergsøya
- Interactive map of Eggesbønes; Eggesbø
- Location within Møre og Romsdal Location within Norway
- Coordinates: 62.3238°N 5.6520°E
- Country: Norway
- Region: Western Norway
- County: Møre og Romsdal
- District: Sunnmøre
- Municipality: Herøy Municipality
- Elevation: 1 m (3.3 ft)
- Time zone: UTC+01:00 (CET)
  - Summer (DST): UTC+02:00 (CEST)
- Post Code: 6090 Fosnavåg

Eggesbønes or Eggesbø is a neighborhood that is located in the southern part of the town of Fosnavåg in Herøy Municipality in Møre og Romsdal county, Norway. Located on the southern part of the island of Bergsøya, the industrial area of Eggesbønes features a fishing harbor, and the world's largest fish processing plant, which is operated by Marine Harvest.

The village area is located along the Herøyfjorden, just northeast of the Flåværet islands and the Flåvær Lighthouse. The island of Gurskøya is located across the fjord.
