= Indre Herøy Church =

Church in Møre og Romsdal, Norway

- Indre Herøy kyrkje
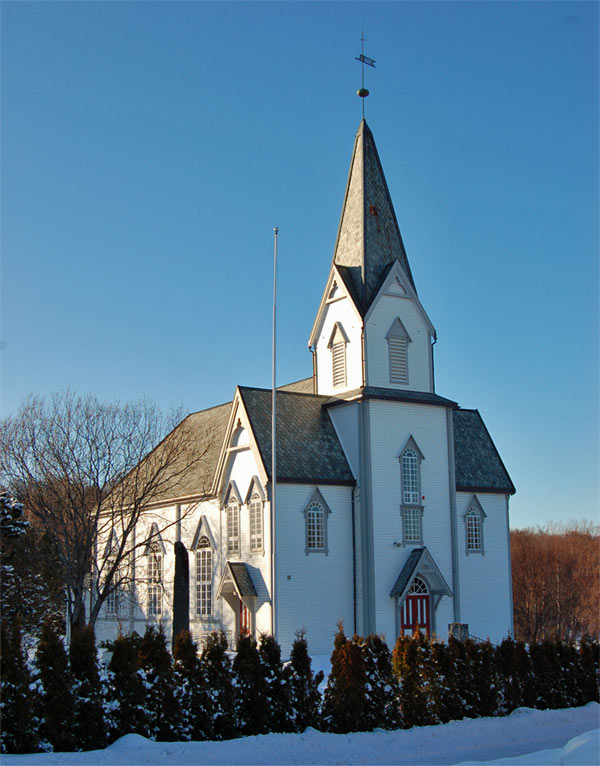
- View of the church
- Indre Herøy Church
- 62°18′13″N 5°43′34″E
- Location: Herøy, Møre og Romsdal
- Country: Norway
- Denomination: Church of Norway
- Churchmanship: Evangelical Lutheran

History
- Status: Parish church
- Founded: 1916
- Consecrated: 1916

Architecture
- Functional status: Active
- Architect: Ole Havnæs
- Architectural type: Long church
- Completed: 1916 (110 years ago)

Specifications
- Capacity: 375
- Materials: Wood

Administration
- Diocese: Møre bispedømme
- Deanery: Søre Sunnmøre prosti
- Parish: Indre Herøy
- Norwegian Cultural Heritage Site
- Type: Church
- Status: Not protected
- ID: 84717

Indre Herøy Church (Norwegian: Indre Herøy kyrkje) is a parish church of the Church of Norway in Herøy Municipality in Møre og Romsdal county, Norway. It is located in the village of Stokksund on the northeastern shore of the island of Gurskøya. It is the church for the Indre Herøy parish which is part of the Søre Sunnmøre prosti (deanery) in the Diocese of Møre. The white, wooden church was built in a long church style in 1916 by the architect Ole Havnæs, and the building was consecrated on 18 August 1916. The church seats about 375 people.

== History ==
The parish of Herøy was long based at the old Herøy Church on the small island of Herøya. In 1916, however, the parish was divided, and the main church site was moved from the small island to the northwest into the large village of Fosnavåg. At the same time, a new church site was established in Stokksund on Gurskøya to serve the people of that island. This is where the new Indre Herøy Church was built. It was consecrated in 1916. The church was designed by builder Ole Havnæs from the town of Ålesund.

== See also ==
- List of churches in Møre
