= Flåvær Lighthouse =

Coastal lighthouse in Møre og Romsdal, Norway

Flåvær Lighthouse Flåvær fyrstasjon
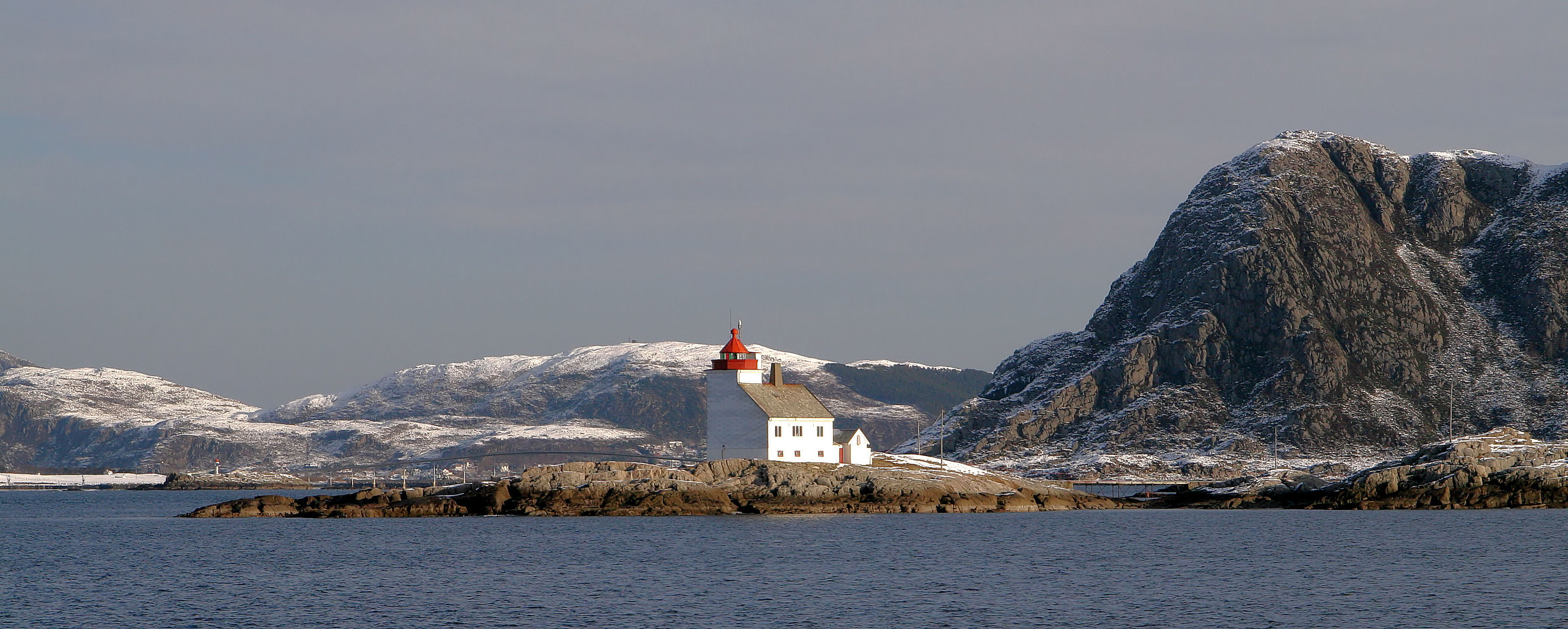
- Flåvær lighthouse
- Location: Flåværet, Herøy Municipality, Norway
- Coordinates: 62°18′56″N 5°34′57″E

Tower
- Constructed: 1870
- Foundation: granite basement
- Construction: wooden tower
- Automated: 1979
- Height: 13.8 m (45 ft)
- Shape: square tower with balcony and lantern
- Markings: white tower, red balcony and lantern
- Heritage: heritage site in Norway

Light
- Focal height: 16.8 m (55 ft)
- Lens: 4th order Fresnel lens
- Range: 13.2 nmi (24.4 km; 15.2 mi)
- Characteristic: Oc(3) WRG 10s

Flåvær fyr is a coastal lighthouse in Herøy Municipality in Møre og Romsdal county, Norway. The lighthouse is located on the island of Vardholmen which is in the Flåværet archipelago in the Herøyfjorden. The lighthouse is located southwest of the town of Fosnavåg and the village of Eggesbønes and it is located north of the island of Gurskøya.

The 13.8-metre (45 ft) tall lighthouse was first built in 1870, and it was renovated in 1887 and 1914. In 1952 it was connected to the electrical power grid, and it was fully automated in 1979.

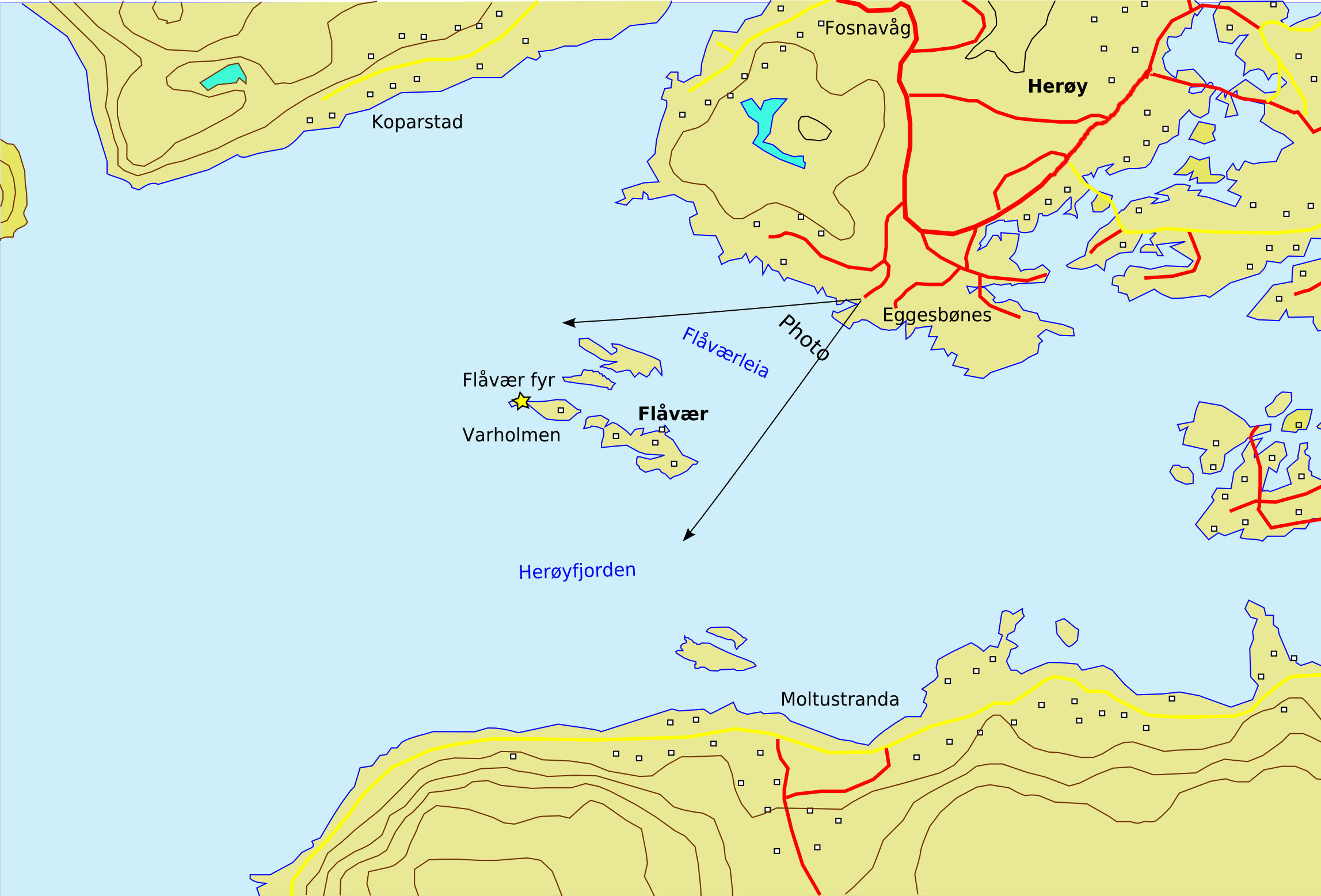
Map of Flåvær lighthouse in the Herøyfjorden.

== See also ==
- List of lighthouses in Norway
- Lighthouses in Norway
