= Rem Offshore =

Norwegian maritime company

Rem Offshore ASA
- Type: Public (OSE: REM)
- Industry: Shipping
- Founded: 2017
- Headquarters: Fosnavåg, Norway
- Area served: Norway
- Key people: Aage Remøy (CEO)
- Services: Supply vessels Fishing vessels
- Revenue: NOK 190 million
- Operating income: NOK 112 million
- Net income: NOK 91 million
- Website: www.remoffshore.no

Rem Offshore (OSE: REM) is a fishing and supply shipping company based in Fosnavåg, Norway.

The company was founded by Aage Remøy, who was chief executive officer, in 1996 as a spinoff from the family fisheries business. The group consisted of two holding companies, Rem Offshore AS and Remøy Fiskeriselskap AS, responsible for the supply and fisheries fleet, respectively. Since the listing of REM Offshore on the Oslo Stock Exchange in 2007, Solstad Offshore ASA from Skudeneshavn was the major shareholder of the company.

In July 2016, it was agreed that Rem Offshore would be merged with Solstad Offshore. The merger was approved by shareholders in October, and the company became a subsidiary of Aker Group.

However, the company was re-established in 2016 by Aage Remøy and their first vessel was purchased in 2017.

== Fleet ==
As of 2026, the company operates four construction supply vessels, five construction service operation vessels, 11 platform supply vessels, and one node seismic vessel.
