= Kvalsund (Herøy) =

Village in Herøy Municipality in Møre og Romsdal, Norway

- Village
- Interactive map of Kvalsund
- Location within Møre og Romsdal Location within Norway
- Coordinates: 62.3424°N 5.5948°E
- Country: Norway
- Region: Western Norway
- County: Møre og Romsdal
- District: Sunnmøre
- Municipality: Herøy Municipality

Area
  - Total: 0.56 km^{2} (0.22 sq mi)
- Elevation: 19 m (62 ft)

Population (2024)
  - Total: 597
  - Density: 1,066/km^{2} (2,760/sq mi)
- Time zone: UTC+01:00 (CET)
  - Summer (DST): UTC+02:00 (CEST)
- Post Code: 6098 Nerlandsøy

Kvalsund is a village in Herøy Municipality in Møre og Romsdal county, Norway. It is located on the island of Nerlandsøya. Kvalsund is a fishing port with a sizable deep-water harbor, marina, and waterfront protected by breakwaters. Kvalsund is connected to the island of Bergsøya by the Nerlandsøy Bridge.

== Population ==
The 0.56-square-kilometre (140-acre) village has a population (2024) of 597 and a population density of 1,066 inhabitants per square kilometre (2,760/sq mi).

Historical population
Year	1970	1980	1990	2001	2012	2018	2024
Pop.	438	448	450	494	524	575	597
±% p.a.	—	+0.23%	+0.04%	+0.85%	+0.54%	+1.56%	+0.63%

== Gallery ==
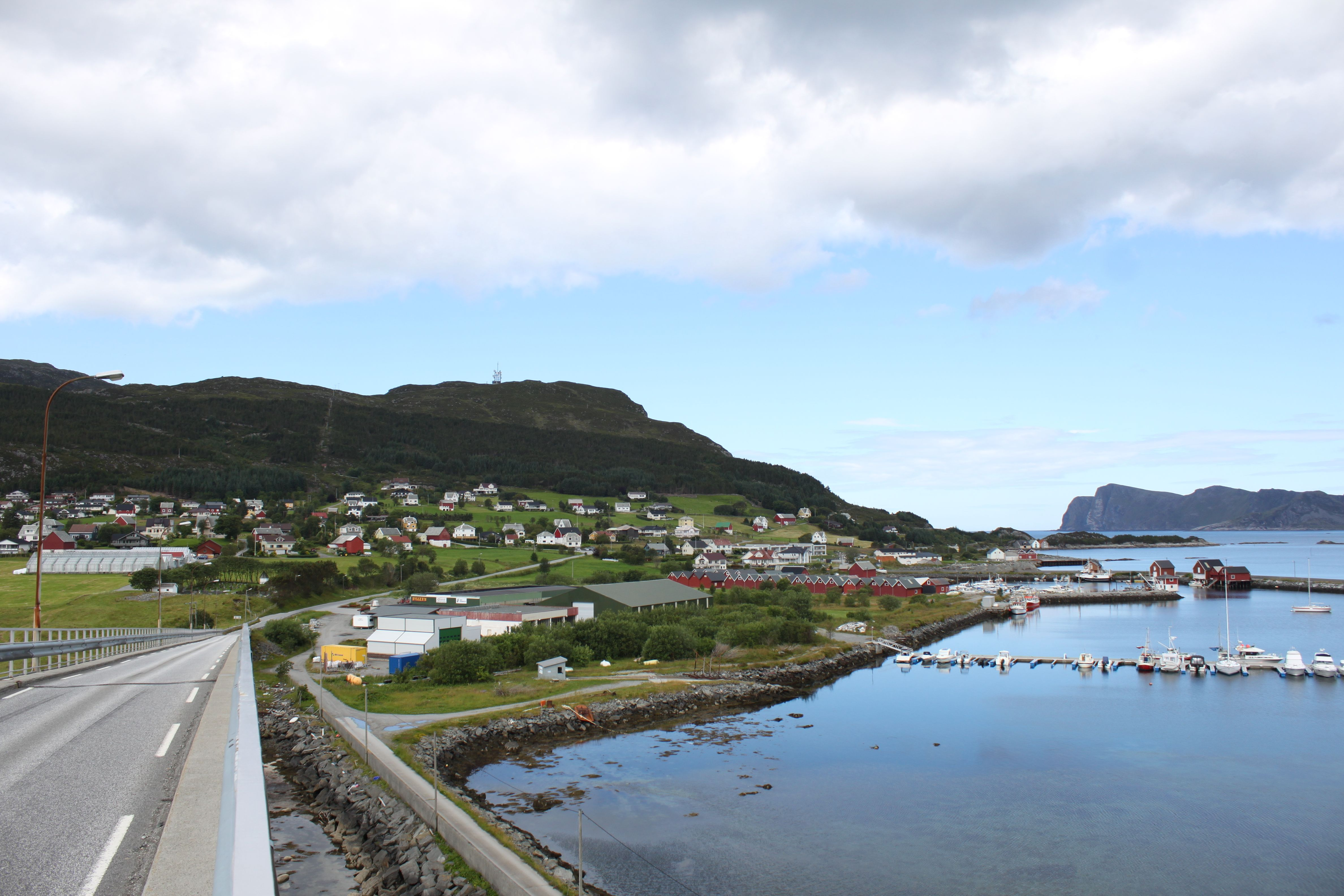
Village of Kvalsund

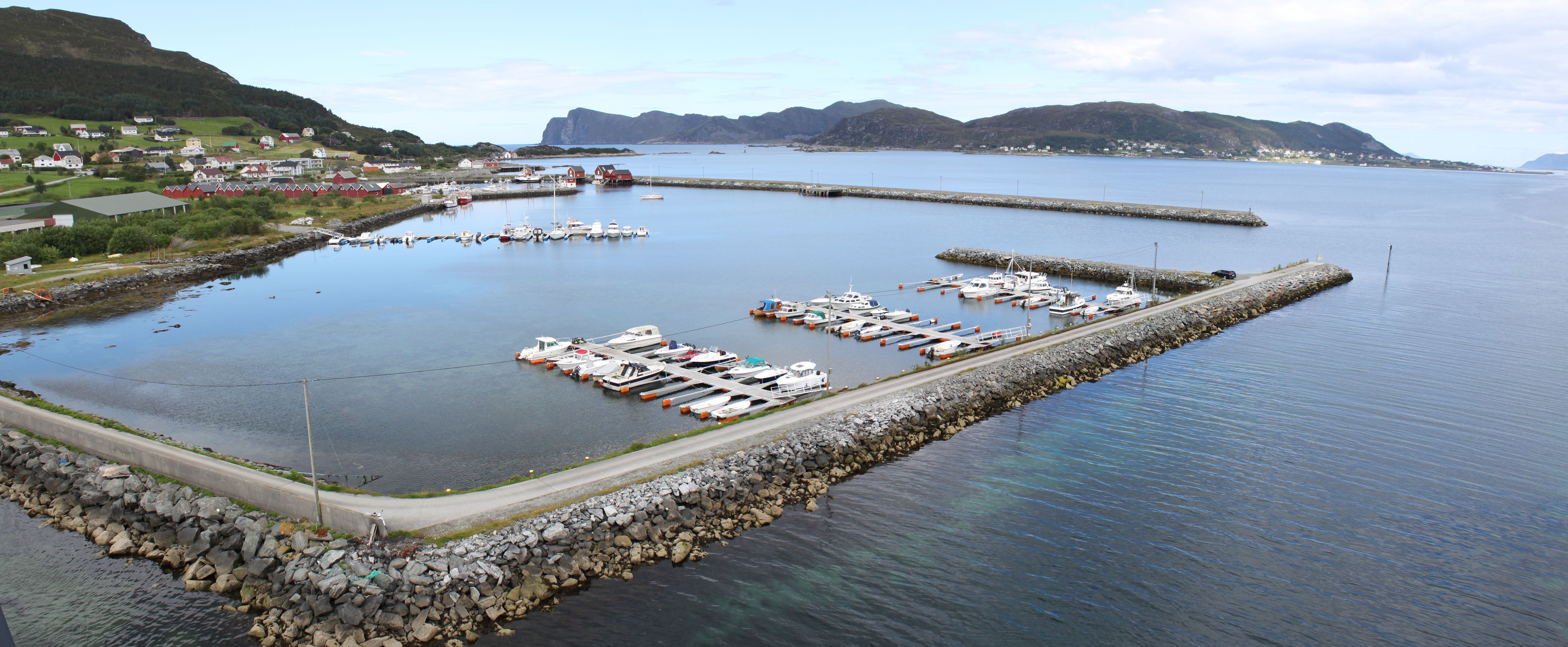
Port area of Kvalsund

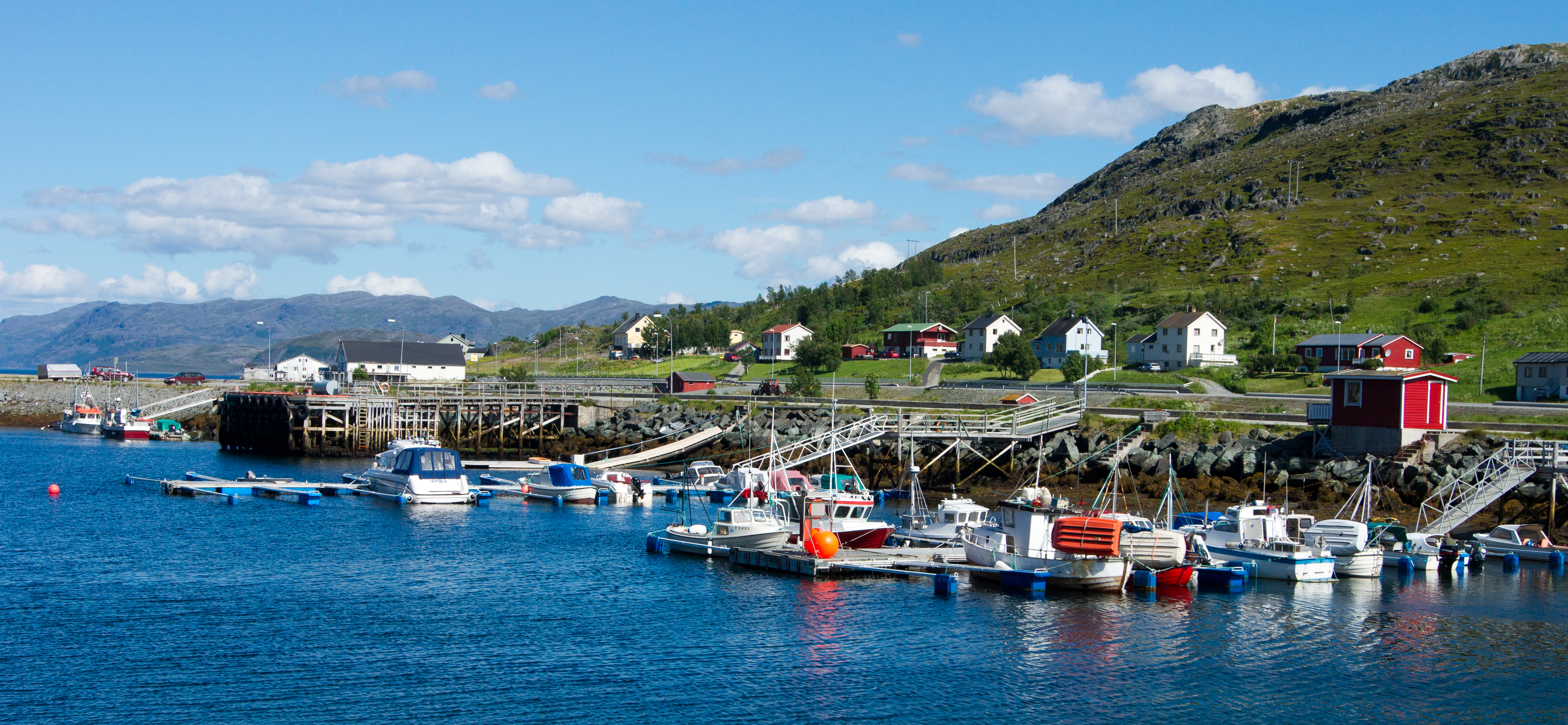
Marina and Harbor at Kvalsund
