= Herøyfjorden =

Fjord in Møre og Romsdal, Norway

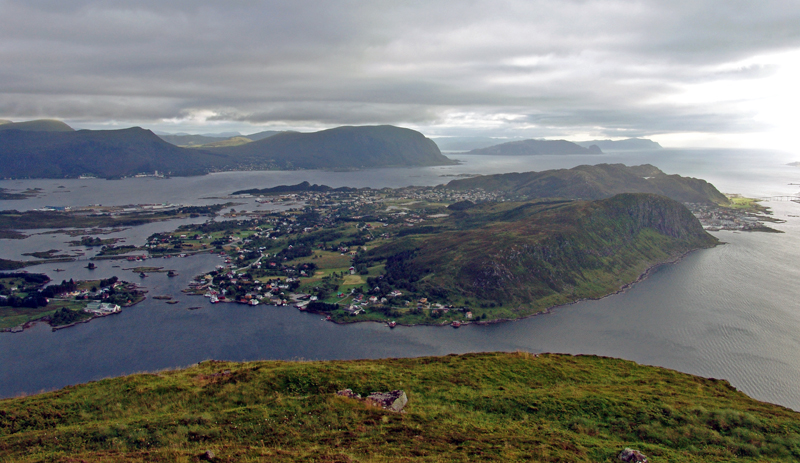
- View of the fjord (background)
- Interactive map of the fjord
- Location: Møre og Romsdal county, Norway
- Coordinates: 62.308966°N 5.577983°E
- Type: Fjord
- Basin countries: Norway
- Max. length: 8 kilometres (5.0 mi)
- Max. width: 2 kilometres (1.2 mi)
- Max. depth: 175 metres (574 ft)

Herøyfjorden is a fjord which bisects Herøy Municipality in Møre og Romsdal county, Norway. The fjord is about 8 kilometres (5.0 mi) long and about 2 kilometres (1.2 mi) wide, between the islands of Bergsøya and Gurskøya. The fjord has a maximum depth of 175 metres (574 ft).

The fjord has many islands located within it including Herøya and Nautøya in the east. The Flåvær islands are located in the central part of the Herøyfjorden. It is a group of islets and skerries including Flåvær, Husholmen, Torvholmen and Varholmen. The Flåvær Lighthouse is located on Varholmen.

The village of Eggesbønes lies on the north shore of the fjord, just south of the town of Fosnavåg.

== See also ==
- List of Norwegian fjords
