= Havila Shipping =

Norwegian shipping company

Havila Shipping ASA
- Industry: Shipping
- Headquarters: Fosnavåg, Norway
- Area served: North Sea; Asia Pacific
- Key people: Njål Sævik (CEO); Per Sævik (Chairman)
- Services: Maritime support
- Number of employees: 430 (2009)
- Website: www.havila.no

Havila Shipping ASA is a Norwegian shipping company, trading on the Oslo stock exchange. The company was established on 31 July 2003 and operates 22 vessels; platform supply vessel, anchor handling tug supply vessel, rescue- and recovery vessel and subsea construction vessel. The company has a newbuilding program of 5 vessels. The Company's business concept is to provide maritime support functions for international offshore oil and gas production, to own and run the assets regarded as necessary or desirable for this, and to provide associated services.

The main market for the Company's ships is the North Sea and Asia Pacific region.

The Company has its head office in Fosnavåg.

== History ==
In 2024, the company reported freight revenues of NOK148 million (US$13.2 million).

In March 2025, the company took a group of financial lenders to court after they alleged a breach of their restructuring agreement.

== Ships ==
| Platform Supply Vessel | Anchorhandling/Tug/Supply | Subsea Construction | Rescue- and Recovery Vessel |
|---|---|---|---|
| Havila Aurora | Havila Jupiter | Acergy Havila | Havila Runde |
| Havila Borg | Havila Mars | Havila Harmony | Havila Troll - on contract to statoil |
| Havila Faith | Havila Mercury | Havila Phoenix | |
| Havila Fanø | Havila Neptune | Havyard 855 | |
| Havila Favour | Havila Saturn | | |
| Havila Foresight | Havila Venus | | |
| Havila Fortress | | | |
| Havila Fortune | | | |
| Havila Herøy | | | |
| Havila Princess | | | |
