= Svinøy Lighthouse =

Lighthouse in Møre og Romsdal, Norway

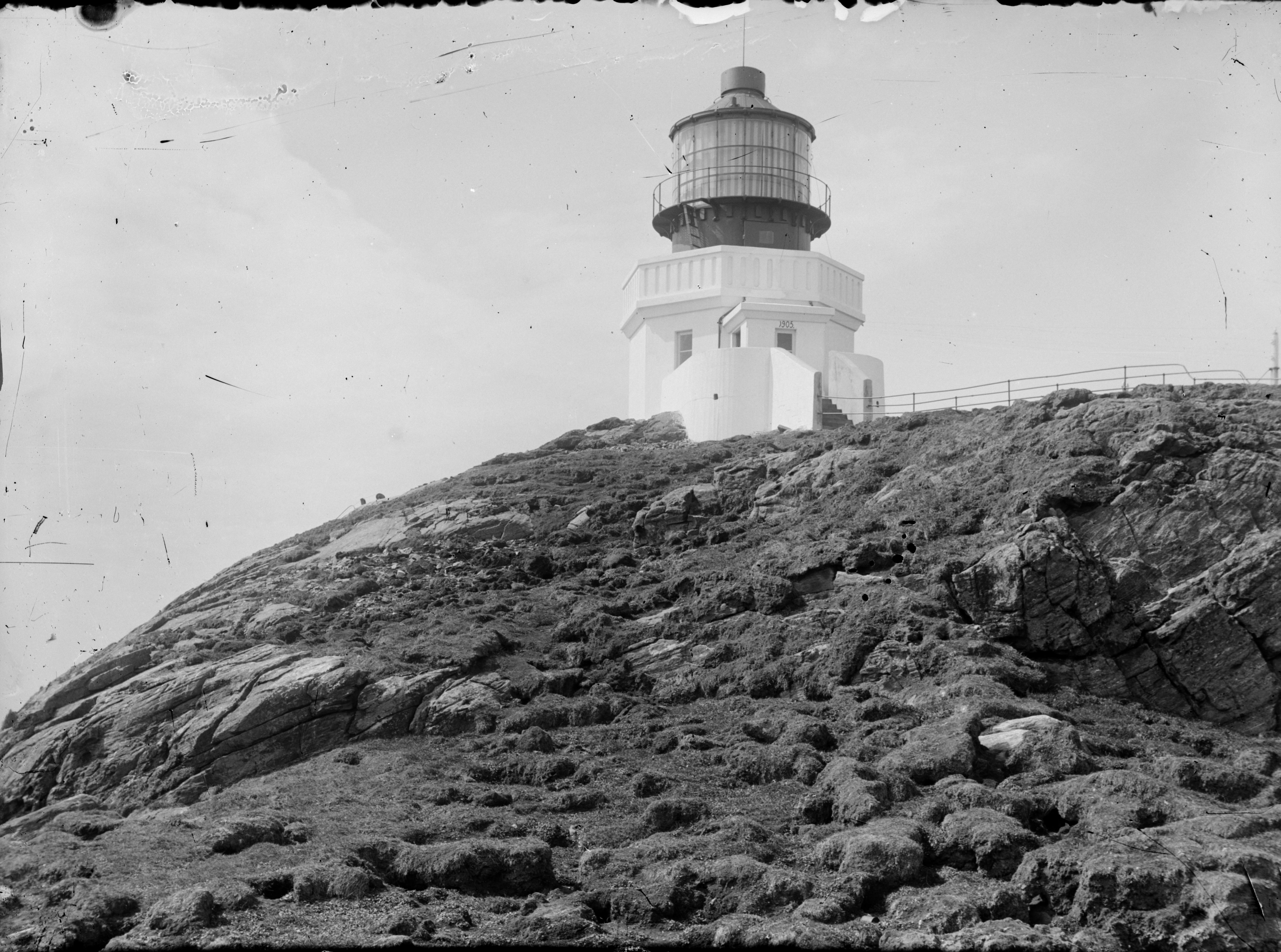
- Location: Herøy Municipality, Norway
- Coordinates: 62°19′53″N 5°16′02″E

Tower
- Constructed: 1905
- Foundation: granite
- Construction: stone tower
- Automated: 2005
- Height: 11 m (36 ft)
- Shape: octagonal tower with balcony and lantern
- Markings: white tower with red trim, red lantern
- Heritage: heritage site

Light
- Focal height: 46 m (151 ft)
- Range: 18.5 nmi (34.3 km; 21.3 mi)
- Characteristic: Fl(2) W 30s

Svinøy Lighthouse (Norwegian: Svinøy fyrstasjon) is a fully automated lighthouse situated on the island of Svinøy in the sea off the Stad peninsula. It is located within Herøy Municipality in Møre og Romsdal county, on the western coast of Norway. The island lies within sight of the mainland and it is 6 kilometres (3.7 mi) from the nearest island. The island of Skorpa is located about 11 kilometres (6.8 mi) to the east. The island is 300 metres (980 ft) east to west and 900 metres (3,000 ft) north to south. The island rises 35 metres (115 ft) out of the sea and is exposed to severe climatic conditions year round.

== History ==
Travel accounts from the 18th century tell that local farmers would put pigs out to pasture on the island during the summer, hence the name Svinøy (English: swine island); this oral tradition was confirmed by a historian in 1931, but it seems likely that goats were put on the island in the summer.

A lighthouse commission of 1851 recommended placing a lighthouse on Svinøy but found conditions too difficult to implement such plans. As an interim measure, a marker was placed on the island. The plans for a full lighthouse were realized in the following decades, and on 1 September 1905, the lighthouse was finished and lit, with further construction finished the following year.

Quarters for several families were built, but the isolated island was never a popular station. At the peak, three families lived on the island, growing vegetable gardens and employing a tutor for their children.

During World War II, German troops were stationed at the lighthouse, and in 1940, Allied bomb raids put the light out of commission. It was repaired after the war and reopened in 1946.

By 1952, it became apparent that no crew were willing to be permanently stationed on the island. A crew of four was stationed there in a shift arrangement, and the shift arrangements eased in 1970 when helicopters were used to ferry staff and supplies between the island and the mainland. In addition to lighthouse duties, the staff also conducted meteorological measurements on an ongoing basis. At one time, goats were brought onto the island to provide a hobby for the inhabitants.

On the 100th anniversary of the original lighting of the firehouse, the island was depopulated as the light was fully automated. Although many of the original buildings have been torn down, the station still includes several buildings and can now sleep 10 in comfortable but modest circumstances.

Since 2005, the company 62 Nord has offered overnight arrangements for small groups.

== Flora and fauna ==
Botanic surveys of the island were conducted in 1928 and 2005. The plant diversity had increased in the intervening years, possibly due to weeds being imported when inhabitants planted vegetable gardens. Wind and salt spray limit the natural vegetation to lichen (Xanthoria parietina and Ramalina cuspidata) and grasses (Armeria maritima and more).

Located about 20 kilometres (12 mi) southwest of the renowned bird island of Runde, Svinøy also attracts a rich diversity of birds, including puffins.

== Climate ==
Weather conditions have been measured since 1955, and currently the island has an automated weather station under the Norwegian Coastal Administration. The climate on the island is typically coastal, with precipitation of about 780 millimetres (31 in) a year, somewhat less than what is typical on Norway's western coast. Precipitation measurements are complicated by high winds and sea spray.

Climate data for Svinøy Lighthouse 1991-2020 (38 m, precipitation 1961-90)
| Month | Jan | Feb | Mar | Apr | May | Jun | Jul | Aug | Sep | Oct | Nov | Dec | Year |
|---|---|---|---|---|---|---|---|---|---|---|---|---|---|
| Mean daily maximum °C (°F) | 5.9 (42.6) | 5.2 (41.4) | 5.7 (42.3) | 7.6 (45.7) | 10 (50) | 12.4 (54.3) | 15 (59) | 15.9 (60.6) | 14.2 (57.6) | 11.1 (52.0) | 8.5 (47.3) | 6.6 (43.9) | 9.8 (49.7) |
| Daily mean °C (°F) | 4.5 (40.1) | 3.7 (38.7) | 4.1 (39.4) | 5.6 (42.1) | 8 (46) | 10.6 (51.1) | 13.1 (55.6) | 14.2 (57.6) | 12.6 (54.7) | 9.5 (49.1) | 7 (45) | 5.1 (41.2) | 8.2 (46.7) |
| Mean daily minimum °C (°F) | 2.5 (36.5) | 1.8 (35.2) | 2.2 (36.0) | 3.9 (39.0) | 6.3 (43.3) | 9.2 (48.6) | 11.6 (52.9) | 12.6 (54.7) | 10.7 (51.3) | 7.6 (45.7) | 5 (41) | 3.1 (37.6) | 6.4 (43.5) |
| Average precipitation mm (inches) | 61 (2.4) | 51 (2.0) | 54 (2.1) | 42 (1.7) | 41 (1.6) | 48 (1.9) | 61 (2.4) | 85 (3.3) | 92 (3.6) | 90 (3.5) | 86 (3.4) | 70 (2.8) | 781 (30.7) |
Source 1: yr.no/Norwegian Meteorological Institute
Source 2: NOAA-WMO averages 91-2020 Norway

The island ties for the Norwegian record for sustained winds, at 46 metres per second (100 mph); with gusts considerably higher. Waves are known to wash over the entire island.

So difficult are landing conditions that the island has no piers. There are three landing sites on different sides of the island, and on one, a crane pulls boats out of the water. A boathouse built in 1905 lasted only one year before it was claimed by the sea and rebuilt in concrete well above sea level the year after.

== See also ==
- List of lighthouses in Norway
- Lighthouses in Norway
