= Bergsøya, Herøy =

Island in Møre og Romsdal, Norway

Bergsøya
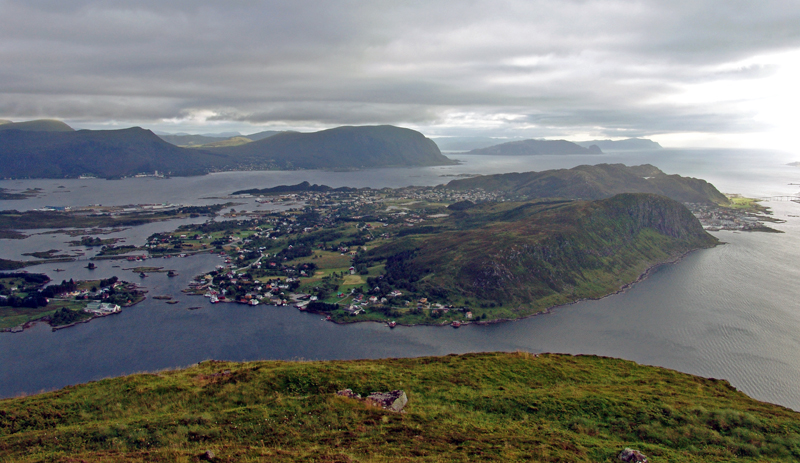
- View of the island
- Interactive map of Bergsøya

Geography
- Location: Møre og Romsdal, Norway
- Coordinates: 62.3324°N 5.6301°E
- Area: 7.6 km^{2} (2.9 sq mi)
- Length: 4.2 km (2.61 mi)
- Width: 3 km (1.9 mi)
- Highest elevation: 216 m (709 ft)
- Highest point: Igesundshetta

Administration
- Norway
- County: Møre og Romsdal
- Municipality: Herøy Municipality

Demographics
- Population: 3,558 (2014)

Bergsøya is an island in Herøy Municipality in Møre og Romsdal county, Norway. The island is the location of the town of Fosnavåg as well as the Eggesbønes industrial area.

The island is connected to other islands via a network of bridges. The Nerlandsøy Bridge connects it to the island Nerlandsøya (to the northwest) and a small road bridge connects it to Leinøya (to the east).

The Flåværet islands lie to the south. The highest point on the island is Igesundshetta which is 216 metres (709 ft) above sea level. The 7.6-square-kilometre (2.9 sq mi) island has a population of 3,558 in 2014.

== See also ==
- List of islands of Norway
