= Flåværet =

Island in Møre og Romsdal, Norway

Flåværet Flåvær
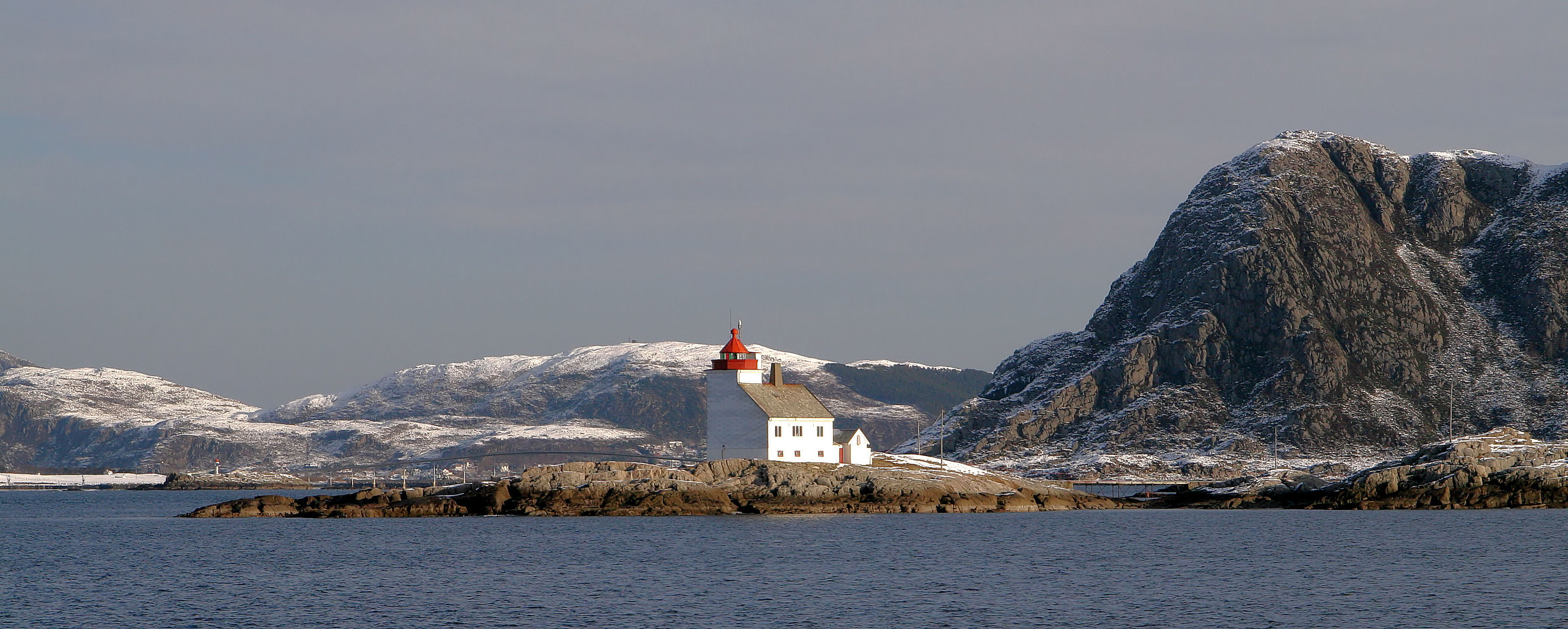
- Flåvær lighthouse on Vardholmen
- Interactive map of Flåværet; Flåvær

Geography
- Location: Møre og Romsdal, Norway
- Coordinates: 62.3131°N 5.6016°E
- Major islands: Vardholmen, Torvholmen, Store Sandøya, Lisle Sandøya, Kalveholmen

Administration
- Norway
- County: Møre og Romsdal
- Municipality: Herøy Municipality

Demographics
- Population: 0

Flåværet (also spelled Flåvær) is small group of islets and skerries in Herøy Municipality in Møre og Romsdal county, Norway. The islands are located in the Herøyfjorden, north of the island Gurskøya and southwest of the town of Fosnavåg. It includes the islets Flåvær, Husholmen, Torvholmen, and Vardholmen (the Norwegian term holme translates as islet, signifying that these are small).

== History ==
In earlier times, there was extensive activity at Flåværet due to its central position in the Herøyfjorden. Flåværet was both a fishing station and a store where the fishing fleet could get supplies close to the fishing fields. It provided useful harbor and mooring facilities. In the days of the rich herring fisheries, the harbor was often crowded with fishing vessels, and as many as 1,500 people gathered there. From 1873 to 1976 there was a post office. Also, from 1929 to 1961 and again from 1981 until 1984, a school was located here. The Flåvær fyrstasjon, which was erected on Vardholmen in 1870, is still located there.

By 1981, Flåværet had only 14 remaining inhabitants on the four islets. Today Flåvær is depopulated, but it is possible to spend a vacation in the cottages there and to arrange for conferences on Flåvær and Torvholmen.

== Panorama view ==
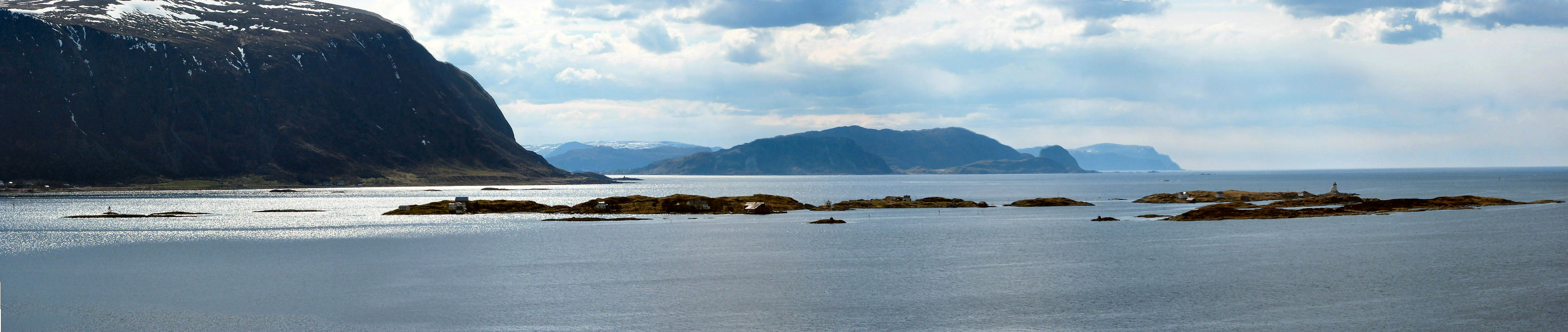
Flåvær seen from Herøy. Stad (Cape West) in the far background.

== See also ==
- List of islands of Norway
