= Fosnavåg =

Town in Møre og Romsdal, Norway

- Town/City
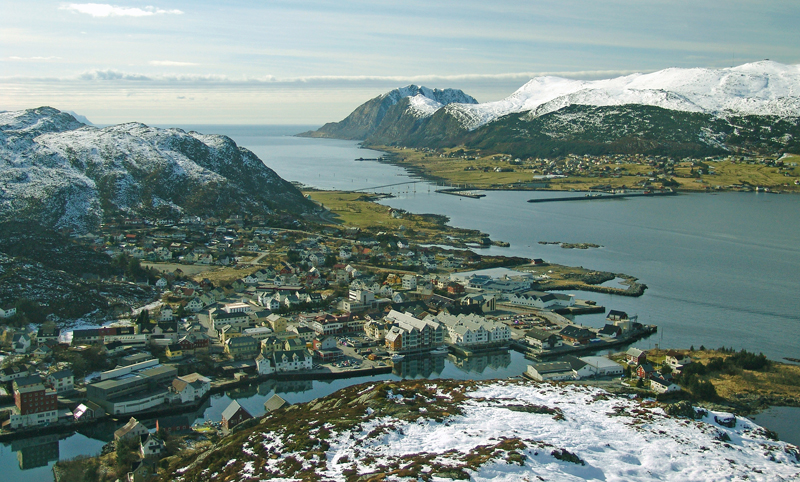
- View of the town
- Interactive map of Fosnavåg
- Location within Møre og Romsdal Location within Norway
- Coordinates: 62.3419°N 5.6340°E
- Country: Norway
- Region: Western Norway
- County: Møre og Romsdal
- District: Sunnmøre
- Municipality: Herøy Municipality
- Established as
- Town (By): 2000

Area
  - Total: 3.12 km^{2} (1.20 sq mi)
- Elevation: 4 m (13 ft)

Population (2024)
  - Total: 3,626
  - Density: 1,162/km^{2} (3,010/sq mi)
- Time zone: UTC+01:00 (CET)
  - Summer (DST): UTC+02:00 (CEST)
- Post Code: 6090 Fosnavåg

Fosnavåg is a town in Herøy Municipality in Møre og Romsdal county, Norway. It is the administrative center of the municipality. The town is located on the island of Bergsøya, and it includes the Eggesbønes area on the south side of the island.

Fosnavåg is connected to the nearby village of Kvalsund on the island of Nerlandsøya via the Nerlandsøy Bridge to the west. Fosnavåg is connected to the east by a small bridge to the island of Leinøya, which in turn is connected to the islands of Remøya and Runde via the Remøy Bridge and Runde Bridge. The village of Eggesbønes lies south of the town along the shore of the Herøyfjorden, just north of the Flåværet islands and the Flåvær Lighthouse. The large island of Gurskøya lies south of Fosnavåg.

On 7 June 2002, the municipal council voted to give Fosnavåg "town status". This is mostly symbolic, but it also means that ships harbored in Fosnavåg can be registered here instead of in other nearest towns like Ålesund and Ulsteinvik. The 3.12-square-kilometre (770-acre) town has a population (2024) of 3,626 and a population density of 1,162 inhabitants per square kilometre (3,010/sq mi).

== Economy ==
Previously functioning mainly as an important fishing port, Fosnavåg has now become a major home for various maritime companies ranging from fishing to shipping, including ship building. Havila Shipping and Rem Offshore are two of the large companies based here. The municipality's secondary school and the main Herøy Church are both also located here. The newspaper Vestlandsnytt is based in Fosnavåg.

== See also ==
- List of towns and cities in Norway
