= May 1940 =

Month of 1940

<<	May 1940					>>
Su	Mo	Tu	We	Th	Fr	Sa
			1	2	3	4
5	6	7	8	9	10	11
12	13	14	15	16	17	18
19	20	21	22	23	24	25
26	27	28	29	30	31

The following events occurred in May 1940:

== May 1, 1940 (Wednesday) ==
- The Battle of Zaoyang–Yichang began in China.
- The Łódź Ghetto was sealed.
- Adolf Hitler set a date of May 6 for the western offensive. This date would be postponed a few more times prior to May 10 due to weather.
- Norwegian troops at Lillehammer surrendered to the Germans.
- The Norwegian troopship Dronning Maud was sunk by German aircraft.
- The very old Norwegian minelayer Uller, captured and pressed into service by the Germans, was bombed and beached by a Heinkel He 115 of the Royal Norwegian Navy Air Service.
- Swedish Prime Minister Per Albin Hansson declared that Sweden would defend its neutrality "with all the means in our power."
- Born: Elsa Peretti, jewelry designer, in Florence, Italy (d. 2021)

== May 2, 1940 (Thursday) ==
- The Germans reached Åndalsnes.
- Italian mystic Gemma Galgani and French nun Mary Euphrasia Pelletier were canonized by Pope Pius XII.
- The International Olympic Committee formally canceled the 1940 Summer Olympics.
- Born: Jo Ann Pflug, actress, in Atlanta, Georgia
- Died: Ernest Joyce, 65?, English seaman and explorer

== May 3, 1940 (Friday) ==
- The Allied evacuation at Namsos was completed, but German aircraft located part of the evacuation fleet and sank the destroyers Afridi and Bison.
- Norwegian troops south of Trondheim surrendered to the Germans.
- German commerce raiders had their first success of the war when the auxiliary cruiser Atlantis sank the British freighter Scientist.
- Born: Conny Plank, record producer and musician, in Hütschenhausen, Germany (d. 1987)

== May 4, 1940 (Saturday) ==
- The Polish destroyer Grom was sunk in the fjord Rombaken by a German Heinkel He 111.
- Gallahadion won the Kentucky Derby.

== May 5, 1940 (Sunday) ==
- The Battle of Hegra Fortress ended when the fortress capitulated. The Germans had now achieved complete victory on Norway's southern front.
- The British submarine Seal was captured by the Germans in the Kattegat.
- RC Paris defeated Olympique de Marseille 2–1 in the Coupe de France Final.
- Born: Lance Henriksen, actor, in New York City

== May 6, 1940 (Monday) ==
- Pope Pius XII shared intelligence with the Princess of Italy Marie José of Belgium that had been gathered by Vatican agents indicating that Germany was planning an attack on the Low Countries.
- John Steinbeck won a Pulitzer Prize for his novel The Grapes of Wrath.
- Unemployment in the United Kingdom fell below 1 million people for the first time in 20 years.
- Died: Jonah Kumalae, 65, Hawaiian politician, businessman and ukulele manufacturer

== May 7, 1940 (Tuesday) ==
- Norway Debate: The British House of Commons began a contentious debate on the conduct of the war. Sir Roger Keyes dramatically appeared dressed in full military uniform with six rows of medals and described in detail the government's mishandling of the Norwegian campaign. Leo Amery stood and uttered the famous words, "Somehow or other we must get into the Government men who can match our enemies in fighting spirit, in daring, in resolution and in thirst for victory." After quoting Oliver Cromwell, he continued: "I will quote certain other words. I do it with great reluctance, because I am speaking of those who are old friends and associates of mine, but they are words which, I think, are applicable to the present situation. This is what Cromwell said to the Long Parliament when he thought it was no longer fit to conduct the affairs of the nation: 'You have sat too long here for any good you have been doing. Depart, I say, and let us have done with you. In the name of God, go!'"
- Almost 5,000 Polish mountain troops arrived at Harstad.
- Semyon Timoshenko replaced Kliment Voroshilov as the Soviet Union's Minister of Defence.
- Born: Angela Carter, novelist and journalist, in Eastbourne, England (d. 1992); Jim Connors, disc jockey, in Pawtucket, Rhode Island (d. 1987)
- Died: George Lansbury, 81, British politician and social reformer

== May 8, 1940 (Wednesday) ==
- The Actions in Nordland began.
- The Norway Debate continued in Parliament. David Lloyd George said that since Chamberlain had asked the nation for sacrifice, "I say solemnly that the Prime Minister should give an example of sacrifice, because there is nothing which can contribute more to victory in this war than that he should sacrifice the seals of office." Chamberlain survived a motion of no confidence by a vote of 281 to 200, but the number of abstentions from within his own Conservative Party caused the level of support for his government to appear very weak.
- Rafael Ángel Calderón Guardia became the 19th President of Costa Rica.
- Born:
  - Peter Benchley, author, in Princeton, New Jersey (d. 2006);
  - Emilio Delgado, actor (Sesame Street), singer and activist, in Calexico, California (d. 2022)
  - Ricky Nelson, actor, singer and songwriter, in Teaneck, New Jersey (d. 1985);
  - Toni Tennille, singer-songwriter, keyboardist and one-half of the musical duo Captain & Tennille, in Montgomery, Alabama

== May 9, 1940 (Thursday) ==
- The age of conscription in the United Kingdom was raised to 36.
- Belgium declared a state of emergency and placed its military on alert.
- British troops occupied Iceland.
- The Grand Ducal Family of Luxembourg and most of its government fled westward into France due to reports of German troop movements.
- Four battalions of the Polish Armed Forces in the West arrived at Narvik.
- Born: James L. Brooks, director, producer and screenwriter, in Brooklyn, New York

== May 10, 1940 (Friday) ==
- Germany invaded France and the Low Countries at dawn. The Battles of France, the Netherlands, and Belgium began.
- U.S. President Franklin D. Roosevelt learned of the German attack at 11:00 p.m. (23:00) on May 9, Washington time. He phoned his Treasury Secretary, Henry Morgenthau Jr., and told him to freeze Belgian, Dutch, and Luxembourger assets in the United States to keep them out of Germany's hands. Roosevelt could do little more that night, since phone calls to Paris and Brussels were rarely getting through, so he went to bed at 2:40 a.m. (02:40).
- Neville Chamberlain went to Buckingham Palace around 6:00 in the evening (18:00) and resigned as Prime Minister of the United Kingdom. King George VI asked Winston Churchill to form the next government, and Churchill accepted.
- The British execute Operation Fork, the non-violent invasion and occupation of Iceland, as a preventative measure after Germany's rapid conquest of Denmark.
- The Battles of Rotterdam and Zeeland began in the Netherlands.
- The Battle of Fort Eben-Emael began in Belgium.
- The Battle of Maastricht resulted in German victory.
- The Battle for The Hague resulted in tactical Dutch victory.
- Germany conquered Luxembourg within the day.
- The German-controlled Norwegian troopship Nordnorge was sunk at Hemnesberget by British warships.
- The colonial governor-general of the Netherlands East Indies declared martial law, ordering the seizure of 19 German cargo ships and the internment of all German nationals.
- The biographical film Edison, the Man (1940), starring Spencer Tracy, was released.
- Born: Wayne Dyer, self-help author and motivational speaker, in Detroit, Michigan, United States, North America (d. 2015).

== May 11, 1940 (Saturday) ==
- The Battle of the Grebbeberg began in the central Netherlands.
- The Battle of Fort Eben-Emael ended with the German capture of the fort.
- President Roosevelt added the newly belligerent countries to the list of states whose submarines were prohibited from entering American ports and territorial waters.
- British and French troops occupied the Dutch Caribbean possessions of Curaçao and Aruba. President Roosevelt announced that these actions were not contrary to the Monroe Doctrine and allowed them.
- The British spy film Contraband starring Conrad Veidt and Valerie Hobson was released.
- Born: Juan Downey, video artist, in Santiago, Chile (d. 1993)
- Died: Ralph Paget, 75, British diplomat

== May 12, 1940 (Sunday) ==
- The Battle of Sedan began. In this key battle the Germans attempted to capture the important strategic point of Sedan, which would enable them to cross the Meuse and advance into the undefended French countryside.
- The Battle of the Afsluitdijk began in the Netherlands.
- The Battle of Hannut began in Belgium.
- Sir Kingsley Wood became Chancellor of the Exchequer.
- Rose Philippine Duchesne was beatified by Pope Pius XII.
- Child star Shirley Temple, through her mother Gertrude Temple, canceled her movie contract with 20th Century Fox and retired from film acting at age 11.
- Died: Andrew McPherson, 22, RAF bomber pilot (killed in action near Lanaken, Belgium)

== May 13, 1940 (Monday) ==
- Winston Churchill made his first speech to the House of Commons as Prime Minister. He famously said, "I have nothing to offer but blood, toil, tears, and sweat."
- The Battle of the Grebbeberg ended in German victory.
- Wilhelmina of the Netherlands arrived in London in exile.
- Born: Bruce Chatwin, writer, near Sheffield, England (d. 1989)

== May 14, 1940 (Tuesday) ==
- The Battle of Gembloux began in Belgium.
- The Battle of Rotterdam ended in German victory. The Luftwaffe conducted the Rotterdam Blitz.
- The Battle of the Afsluitdijk ended in Dutch victory.
- The Battle of Hannut ended in tactical French victory but strategic and operational German victory.
- The Dutch Navy scuttled many ships to prevent capture by German forces. The Germans later salvaged the submarines O 8, O 11, O 25, O 26 and O 27 and put them into service.
- Lord Beaverbrook became Minister of Aircraft Production and Ernest Bevin became Minister of Labour.
- French artillery and antitank guns hit Erwin Rommel's tank near the Belgian village of Onhaye. Rommel was wounded in the right cheek by a small shell splinter as the tank slid down a slope and rolled over on its side, but he escaped serious injury.
- The Local Defence Volunteers organization was created in Britain.
- Born: H. Jones, British Army officer and posthumous recipient of the Victoria Cross, in Putney, England (d. 1982)
- Died: Emma Goldman, 70, Lithuanian-born anarchist

== May 15, 1940 (Wednesday) ==
- The Netherlands surrendered to Germany at 10:15 a.m.
- As a response to the Rotterdam Blitz on the previous day, the first large-scale strategic bombing of World War II targets Gelsenkirchen, followed by Hamburg, Bremen, Cologne, Essen, Duisburg, Düsseldorf and Hanover during the next days.
- The Battle of Sedan ended in German victory. All the bridges across the Meuse were captured, allowing the Wehrmacht to pour across the river and advance toward the English Channel unimpeded.
- The Battle of Gembloux ended with the German offensive checked.
- Churchill sent a message to Roosevelt asking for a one-year loan of forty or fifty older destroyers as well as aircraft, antiaircraft guns and steel.
- The very first McDonald's restaurant opens in San Bernardino, California.
- Born: Lainie Kazan, actress and singer, in Brooklyn, New York; Don Nelson, basketball player and coach, in Muskegon, Michigan
- Died: Menno ter Braak, 38, Dutch author (suicide)

== May 16, 1940 (Thursday) ==
- Following the Battle of Sedan, the XIX Panzer Corps of Heinz Guderian headed west instead of driving south or southwest as the French had expected. The Battle of France entered a new phase, the dash to the English Channel. Guderian's forces reached Marle and Dercy, an advance of 40 miles in a single day.
- The German 6th Army broke through the Belgian K-W Line.
- President Roosevelt sent a message back to Churchill explaining that a loan of destroyers would require an act of Congress, but generally agreeing on the other matters.
- Roosevelt made a speech before Congress requesting an immediate appropriation of $896 million for national defense. "Surely, the developments of the past few weeks have made it clear to all of our citizens that the possibility of attack on vital American zones ought to make it essential that we have the physical, the ready ability to meet those attacks and to prevent them from reaching their objectives," the president explained.
- Died: Zhang Zizhong, 48, general of the Chinese National Revolutionary Army (killed in action at Mount Chang near Yichang, Hubei)

== May 17, 1940 (Friday) ==
- The German 6th Army captured Brussels.
- At 4 a.m. Erwin Rommel's 7th Panzer Division captured the village of Avesnes-sur-Helpe.
- Commander Paul Ludwig Ewald von Kleist ordered the German advance halted and held a tense meeting with Heinz Guderian, berating him for disobeying orders by advancing aggressively instead of waiting to secure his flank. Guderian offered to resign his command and was ordered to turn it over to next senior general in his corps. When Gerd von Rundstedt learned of what had happened he intervened to allow Guderian to keep his post, and a compromise was reached in which Guderian would be allowed to pursue a "reconnaissance in force." Guderian resumed advancing anyway while misleading his superiors about his location.
- The one-day Battle of Montcornet was fought when the 4e Division cuirassée under Colonel Charles de Gaulle attacked the Germans at the strategic village of Montcornet. The French successfully drove off the Germans but were then counterattacked by Stukas and had to withdraw to avoid being encircled.
- The Journal officiel de la République française published a decree allowing chaplains for Muslims in the French Army.
- 4,000 troops of the Canadian Army arrive in Iceland to relieve the British marine force that had occupied the island on May 10.
- All-American Comics #16 was published (cover date July), featuring the first appearance of Green Lantern.
- Born: Alan Kay, computer scientist, in Springfield, Massachusetts; Reynato Puno, Chief Justice of the Supreme Court of the Philippines, in Manila, Philippines

== May 18, 1940 (Saturday) ==
- The Battle of Zeeland ended in German victory.
- The German 18th Army captured Antwerp.
- Rommel's 7th Panzer Division captured Cambrai through deception. Rommel ordered his tanks and self-propelled guns to drive across the open fields and create as much dust as possible, creating the illusion that the advancing force was much larger than it actually was. The defenders abandoned the town without firing a shot.
- Guderian's 2nd Panzer Division captured Saint-Quentin.
- French Prime Minister Paul Reynaud announced he was recalling the ambassador to Spain Philippe Pétain to make him Vice Prime Minister.
- The El Centro earthquake struck southeastern California near the border with Mexico.
- Born: Lenny Lipton, author, filmmaker and stereoscopic vision system inventor, in Brooklyn, New York (d. 2022)

== May 19, 1940 (Sunday) ==
- Maxime Weygand replaced Maurice Gamelin as Allied commander-in-chief.
- British Expeditionary Force Commander General Lord Gort ordered a withdrawal toward port cities including Dunkirk.
- Winston Churchill made his first broadcast to the British people as Prime Minister. Churchill acknowledged that the Germans were making swift progress and that it would be "foolish ... to disguise the gravity of the hour," but said that only a "very small part" of the French Army had yet been heavily engaged. Churchill explained that he had formed an "Administration of men and women of every Party and of almost every point of view. We have differed and quarreled in the past; but now one bond unites us all - to wage war until victory is won, and never to surrender ourselves to servitude and shame, whatever the cost and the agony may be." The speech was titled Be ye men of valour, after a quotation from 1 Maccabees in the Apocrypha.
- Charles Lindbergh made another nationwide radio address in favor of American isolationism. "We need not fear a foreign invasion unless American peoples bring it on through their own quarreling and meddling with affairs abroad," Lindbergh said. "If we desire peace, we need only stop asking for war. No one wishes to attack us, and no one is in a position to do so."
- Died: Diego Mazquiarán, 45, Spanish matador
- Operation Abendsegen French fighters strafed advanced columns of Operation Abendsegen[11]: 4

== May 20, 1940 (Monday) ==
- Guderian's forces captured Amiens, Abbeville and Noyelles-sur-Mer, reaching the northern French coast.
- The U.S. Supreme Court decided Cantwell v. Connecticut.
- Born: Stan Mikita, ice hockey player, in Sokolče, Slovak Republic (d. 2018); Sadaharu Oh, baseball player and holder of the all-time professional home run record, in Sumida, Tokyo, Japan
- Died: Verner von Heidenstam, 80, Swedish poet, novelist and Nobel laureate

== May 21, 1940 (Tuesday) ==
- The Battle of Arras was fought when Allied forces commanded by Major-General Harold Franklyn mounted a counterattack in northeast France. The Allies made initial gains but then withdrew to avoid being encircled.
- Reynaud appeared before his parliament and blamed the military "disaster" on "incredible faults" in the French high command that he said would "be punished." Reynaud dramatically proclaimed, "France cannot die! If a miracle is needed to save France, I believe in miracles because I believe in France!"
- Born: Tony Sheridan, rock singer-songwriter and guitarist, in Norwich, Norfolk, England (d. 2013)

== May 22, 1940 (Wednesday) ==
- The Battle of Boulogne and the Siege of Calais began.
- Britain passed the Emergency Powers (Defence) Act 1940 putting banks, munitions production, wages, profits and work conditions under the control of the state.
- The Anglo-French Supreme War Council met again in Paris.
- Born: Bernard Shaw, journalist and news anchor, in Chicago, Illinois (d. 2022)

== May 23, 1940 (Thursday) ==
- The Battle of the Lys began in Flanders.
- Oswald Mosley and Archibald Maule Ramsay were among a number of Britons arrested under Defence Regulation 18B, a law allowing for the internment of people suspected of being Nazi sympathisers.
- The Treachery Act 1940 received Royal Assent in Britain.
- The musical revue Keep Off the Grass starring Jimmy Durante, Ray Bolger, Jane Froman, Virginia O'Brien and Ilka Chase premiered at the Broadhurst Theatre on Broadway.
- Died: Gaston Billotte, 65, French military officer (car accident); Paul Nizan, 35, French philosopher and writer (killed in action)

== May 24, 1940 (Friday) ==
- The Germans captured the Belgian cities of Ghent and Tournai.
- In agreement with a request from Gerd von Rundstedt, Hitler ordered Paul von Kleist to halt his panzer advance only 18 miles from Dunkirk, not wanting to risk the tanks getting bogged down in the Flanders marshes. This decision would prove to be a crucial mistake by the German leadership.
- Operation Alphabet, the evacuation of the remaining Allied troops in Norway, was authorized.
- Assailants working for the Soviet Union attacked Leon Trotsky at his compound in Coyoacán, Mexico. Several bombs were detonated and hundreds of machine gun rounds were fired at the bedroom, causing such extensive damage that the attackers left assuming that Trotsky was dead. However, he and wife Natalia had taken cover on the floor beside his bed and escaped serious injury.
- On Empire Day, King George VI addressed his subjects by radio, saying, "The decisive struggle is now upon us ... Let no one be mistaken; it is not mere territorial conquest that our enemies are seeking. It is the overthrow, complete and final, of this Empire and of everything for which it stands, and after that the conquest of the world. And if their will prevails they will bring to its accomplishment all the hatred and cruelty which they have already displayed."
- The Polo Grounds in New York City and Sportsman's Park in St. Louis hosted their first night games. The hometown Giants defeated the Boston Braves 8–1 in New York, while the visiting Cleveland Indians edged the Browns 3–2 in St. Louis.
- The film Our Town starring Martha Scott and William Holden in an adaptation of the Thornton Wilder play of the same name was released.
- Born: Joseph Brodsky, poet, essayist and Nobel laureate, in Leningrad, Soviet Union (d. 1996)

== May 25, 1940 (Saturday) ==
- The Battle of Boulogne ended in German victory.
- The British aircraft carrier Illustrious was commissioned.
- A bus plunges into the sea in Hirvensalo, Finland killing 17.
- Died: Joe De Grasse, 67, Canadian film director

== May 26, 1940 (Sunday) ==
- The Battle of Dunkirk began.
- Sir John Dill replaced Edmund Ironside as Chief of the General Staff.
- The British cruiser Curlew was sunk in Ofotfjord by a German air attack.
- Benito Mussolini met with Army Chief of Staff Pietro Badoglio and Air Marshal Italo Balbo in Rome. Mussolini told them that Italy would have to enter the war soon if it wanted a place at the peace conference table when the spoils were divided up. Badoglio tactfully tried to explain that Italy was still unprepared for war, pointing out that there were not even enough shirts for all the soldiers. Mussolini snapped back, "History cannot be reckoned by the number of shirts." He set June 5 as the date for the Italian invasion of France.
- U.S. President Roosevelt gave a fireside chat titled "On National Defense". The president reviewed the grave international situation and then recited many facts and figures to show that America was much better prepared for war than it was at the time he took office in 1933, while assuring the American people that "There is nothing in our present emergency to justify a retreat from any of our social objectives."
- Born: Levon Helm, American singer and musician (The Band), in Elaine, Arkansas (d. 2012)
- Died: Richard Porritt, 29, first British Member of Parliament to be killed in World War II (killed in action in Seclin); Prince Wilhelm of Prussia, 33, son of Wilhelm, German Crown Prince (died in a field hospital from wounds sustained in action in France)

== May 27, 1940 (Monday) ==
- The Dunkirk evacuation codenamed Operation Dynamo began. The first 7,669 British troops were evacuated.
- The Allies took Narvik.
- 14th Company of the SS Division Totenkopf carried out the Le Paradis massacre, leading captured British soldiers of the Royal Norfolk Regiment to a wall and machine-gunning them. 97 were killed but 2 survived and would give eyewitness testimony after the war that would lead to Hauptsturmführer Fritz Knoechlein being convicted and executed as a war criminal.
- Former U.S. President Herbert Hoover made a radio speech titled "We Have No Good Reason to be Discouraged or Fearful," arguing in favor of a strong national defense program. "It can be argued that warmakers from overseas have no reason or intention to attack the Western Hemisphere," Hoover said. "Reasons can be advanced that this war cannot reach American shores. Whatever the outcome in Europe may be, or whatever the intentions of European warmakers may be, that is not the problem I wish to discuss. What America must have is such defenses that no European nation will even think about crossing this three thousand miles of ocean at all. We must make sure that no such dangerous thoughts will be generated in their minds. We want a sign of 'Keep Off the Grass' with a fierce dog plainly in sight."
- The U.S. Supreme Court decided United States v. American Trucking Associations.
- Born: Zack Norman, actor, comedian, writer, producer and film financier, in Boston, Massachusetts (d. 2024)

== May 28, 1940 (Tuesday) ==
- Belgian forces surrendered unconditionally to Germany at 4 a.m. on the orders of King Leopold III. Leaders of the Belgian government in exile (on French territory at this time) declared Leopold's action to be unconstitutional and a bad-tempered Paul Reynaud announced in a radio address that day that "France can no longer count on the Belgian Army" and said the surrender had been made without consulting the British or French governments. Leopold was placed under house arrest by the German occupiers.
- The Wormhoudt massacre (or Wormhout Massacre) took place with the mass murder of 80 British and French POWs by Waffen-SS soldiers from the 1st SS Division Leibstandarte SS Adolf Hitler during the Battle of France in May 1940.
- The Siege of Lille and the Battle of Abbeville began.
- The Battle of the Lys ended in German victory.
- 17,804 were evacuated from Dunkirk.
- Norwegian and British forces captured Narvik back from the Germans.
- German submarine U-121 was commissioned.
- The stage musical Louisiana Purchase with music and lyrics by Irving Berlin and book by Morrie Ryskind premiered at the Imperial Theatre on Broadway.
- Died: Walter Connolly, 53, American film actor; Prince Frederick Charles of Hesse, 72, King of Finland in 1918

== May 29, 1940 (Wednesday) ==
- The Germans captured Lille, Ostend and Ypres.
- 33,558 were evacuated from Dunkirk.
- The British destroyers Grafton, Grenade and Wakeful were sunk during the Dunkirk evacuation.
- The Swedish Home Guard was created.
- The prototype of the Vought F4U Corsair had its first flight.
- Born: Farooq Leghari, 8th President of Pakistan, in Choti Zareen, Punjab (d. 2010)
- Died: Mary Anderson, 80, American stage and film actress

== May 30, 1940 (Thursday) ==
- In the wake of the previous day's losses, the British Admiralty ordered all modern destroyers to depart Dunkirk and leave 18 older destroyers to continue the evacuation. A total of 53,823 were evacuated on this day.
- The French destroyer Bourrasque was damaged by a mine off Nieuwpoort, Belgium and finished off by German artillery fire.
- German submarines U-100 and U-123 were commissioned.
- Died: Ronald Cartland, 33, second British Member of Parliament killed in World War II (killed during retreat to Dunkirk)

== May 31, 1940 (Friday) ==
- Poor weather over Dunkirk allowed the British to conduct the day's evacuations with reduced fear of German air attacks. This day was the high point of the evacuation, with a total of 68,014 rescued.
- French destroyer Siroco was sunk in the North Sea by German S-boats and aircraft.
- The German submarine U-13 was depth charged and sunk in the North Sea.
- The Anglo-French Supreme War Council had another meeting in Paris. Reynaud argued with Churchill over the disparity in numbers between the British and French troops being evacuated at Dunkirk.
- The Siege of Lille ended.
- President Roosevelt sent a written message to Congress asking for an additional $1.3 billion to accelerate military production and training. He also requested that Congress pass a law before it adjourned granting the president authority to "call into active service such portion of the National Guard as may deemed necessary to maintain our position of neutrality and to safeguard the national defense, this to include authority to call into active service the necessary Reserve personnel."
- Died: Arnold Wilson, 55, third British MP killed in World War II (plane crash near Dunkirk)
