= April 1940 =

Month of 1940

<<	April 1940					>>
Su	Mo	Tu	We	Th	Fr	Sa
	1	2	3	4	5	6
7	8	9	10	11	12	13
14	15	16	17	18	19	20
21	22	23	24	25	26	27
28	29	30

The following events occurred in April 1940:

== April 1, 1940 (Monday) ==
- The 1940 United States census was taken.
- The BBC broadcast what appeared to be a speech by Adolf Hitler, in which the Führer reminded the audience that Columbus had discovered America with the help of German science and technology, and therefore Germany had a right "to have some part in the achievement which this voyage of discovery was to result in." This meant that all Americans of Czech and Polish descent were entitled to come under the protection of Germany and that Hitler would "enforce that right, not only theoretically but practically." Once the German Protectorate was extended to the United States, the Statue of Liberty would be removed to alleviate traffic congestion and the White House would be renamed the Brown House. CBS contacted the BBC in something of a panic trying to learn more about the origin of the broadcast, not realizing that it was an April Fools' Day hoax. The voice of Hitler had been impersonated by the actor Martin Miller.
- The soap opera Portia Faces Life premiered in syndication on American radio.
- Born: Wangari Maathai, environmental and political activist and Nobel laureate, in Ihithe, Tetu, Kenya (d. 2011)
- Died: John A. Hobson, 81, English economist and social scientist

== April 2, 1940 (Tuesday) ==
- Adolf Hitler signed the order for Operation Weserübung, the German invasion of Denmark and Norway.
- Germany made another air raid on Scapa Flow.
- Dutch troops were put on full alert along the German border.
- Britain and Denmark signed a trade agreement.
- Born: Penelope Keith, actress, in Sutton, London, England

== April 3, 1940 (Wednesday) ==
- The Battle of Wuyuan ended in Chinese victory.
- Neville Chamberlain performed a reshuffle of his war ministry. Winston Churchill became chairman of the Military Coordinating Committee, Kingsley Wood became Lord Privy Seal, The Lord Woolton became Minister of Food, Robert Hudson took over as Minister of Shipping and Hugh Elles became Chief of the Operational Staff of Civil Defense Services. The position of Minister for Co-ordination of Defence was abolished and its duties dispersed across other departments.
- The British cabinet approved Operation Wilfred, Winston Churchill's plan to mine the sea routes between Norway, Sweden and Germany and for Anglo-French landings in Norway to forestall a German invasion there, which British intelligence believed was imminent. However, the British government still dithered about implementing the plan due to Norway's neutrality.
- British intelligence advised of a German military buildup in northern German ports, suggesting that an invasion somewhere in Scandinavia was imminent.
- Died: Ernst Heilmann, 58, German socialist politician (murdered at Buchenwald concentration camp)

== April 4, 1940 (Thursday) ==
- Neville Chamberlain gave a speech to the Conservative Party in London stating he was confident of victory and that Hitler had "missed the bus" by not taking advantage of Germany's military superiority over Britain at the beginning of the war.
- 34 French communists convicted of illegally attempting to reorganize the Communist Party were sentenced to five years in prison. Eight others received suspended sentences of four years.
- The musical stage comedy Higher and Higher by Rodgers and Hart premiered at the Shubert Theatre on Broadway.

== April 5, 1940 (Friday) ==
- The British began to implement Operation Wilfred by mining Norwegian waters.
- The Katyn massacre began.
- The Norwegian ambassador in Berlin warned Oslo and Copenhagen of a possible German invasion, as did the British. Britain and France also advised Norway that they had the right to act to deprive Germany of access to Norwegian raw materials.
- Bogskar won the Grand National horse race at Aintree Racecourse.
- The fantasy film One Million B.C. starring Victor Mature was released.
- Died: Charles Freer Andrews, 69, Church of England priest, missionary, educator and social reformer in India; Song Zheyuan, 54, Chinese general

== April 6, 1940 (Saturday) ==
- German submarine U-1 went missing in the North Sea, probably lost to a British naval mine.
- Born: Pedro Armendáriz, Jr., actor, in Mexico City, Mexico (d. 2011)

== April 7, 1940 (Sunday) ==
- British reconnaissance aircraft spotted a large German naval force heading northward. RAF bombers were dispatched to attack the group but this attack was not successful.
- Jimmy Demaret won the 7th Masters Tournament at Augusta National Golf Club in Georgia.

== April 8, 1940 (Monday) ==
- Norway protested the British naval mining of its territorial waters.
- The German cruiser Admiral Hipper sank the British destroyer Glowworm in the Norwegian Sea. Despite being hopelessly outgunned, Glowworm managed to ram Admiral Hipper, inflicting considerable damage, before sinking. Captain Gerard Broadmead Roope earned the first Victoria Cross of the war for his conduct, but it was bestowed only after the war when the Admiral Hipper's log describing the battle was read by the Royal Navy.
- The Polish submarine ORP Orzeł sank the German troopship Rio de Janeiro by torpedo in the Skagerrak.
- Born: John Havlicek, basketball player, in Martins Ferry, Ohio (d. 2019)
- Died: Gerard Broadmead Roope, 35, British naval officer and Victoria Cross recipient (killed in action)

== April 9, 1940 (Tuesday) ==
- At 5:20 a.m. in Norway (4:20 a.m. in Denmark), the German envoys in Oslo and Copenhagen presented the Norwegian and Danish governments with a German ultimatum demanding that they immediately accept the "protection of the Reich." Denmark capitulated so as to not provoke mass bloodshed at the hands of the Germans, and the country was invaded in six hours. Norwegian Foreign Affairs Minister Halvdan Koht, however, responded with the defiant words "Vi gir oss ikke frivillig, kampen er allerede i gang" ("We will not submit voluntarily; the struggle is already underway"). The entire Norwegian government including King Haakon VII fled the capital that morning for the mountains in the north.
- German forces quickly took control of the ports of Narvik, Trondheim, Bergen, Stavanger and Oslo.
- German forces captured Arendal and Egersund.
- The Action off Lofoten was fought.
- Vidkun Quisling spoke on Norwegian radio and ordered his countrymen not to resist the Nazis.
- The French and British put Plan R 4 into action.
- The Norwegian destroyer HNoMS Æger was attacked and sunk off Stavanger by German bombers.
- The old Norwegian coastal defence ships HNoMS Eidsvold and 'Norge were sunk near Narvik by the German destroyers Z21 Wilhelm Heidkamp and Z11 Bernd von Arnim, respectively, when they chose to fight rather than surrender.
- The Norwegian destroyer HNoMS Tor was scuttled at Fredrikstad to avoid being captured. The Germans were still able to salvage it, however.
- The guns of Oscarsborg Fortress sank the Blücher in the Battle of Drøbak Sound.
- The German cruiser Karlsruhe was scuttled after being torpedoed and badly damaged near Kristiansand by the British submarine HMS Truant.
- Norwegian coastal artillery sank the German cargo liner Seattle.
- The British destroyer HMS Gurkha was bombed and sunk off Norway.
- Born: Jim Roberts, ice hockey player, in Toronto, Canada (d. 2015)
- Died: Mrs. Patrick Campbell, 75, English stage actress

== April 10, 1940 (Wednesday) ==
- The Battle of Midtskogen was fought in the early morning hours and resulted in Norwegian victory.
- In the First Battle of Narvik, the German destroyers Z22 Anton Schmitt and Z21 Wilhelm Heidkamp were sunk, while the destroyers HMS Hardy and Hunter were lost on the British side.
- With Denmark occupied by the Nazis, Iceland effectively declared independence when the Althing granted full powers of government to the Icelandic cabinet.
- Blackburn Skua dive bombers of the British Fleet Air Arm sank the German cruiser Königsberg at Bergen.
- The German submarine U-4 sank the British submarine HMS Thistle near Skudeneshavn.
- A German armed merchant vessel sank the British submarine Tarpon by depth charges off the Danish coast.
- U.S. President Franklin D. Roosevelt issued Executive Order 8389, freezing Danish and Norwegian assets in the United States so the Germans could not access them.
- Born: Gloria Hunniford, Northern Irish broadcaster in Portadown, County Armagh

== April 11, 1940 (Thursday) ==
- The German pocket battleship Lützow was knocked out of action for a year after being hit by a torpedo from the British submarine HMS Spearfish in the Kattegat.
- First Lord of the Admiralty Winston Churchill made a speech to the House of Commons announcing that the strategically important Faroe Islands belonging to Denmark were now being occupied by Britain. "We shall shield the Faroe Islands from all the severities of war and establish ourselves there conveniently by sea and air until the moment comes when they will be handed back to the Crown and people of a Denmark liberated from the foul thraldom in which they have been plunged by the German aggression," Churchill said.
- Belgium canceled army leave.

== April 12, 1940 (Friday) ==
- The Cyprus Regiment was founded.
- During a press conference at the White House, reporters asked President Roosevelt whether a violation of the integrity of Greenland, such as a German invasion, would raise the question of applying the Monroe Doctrine. The president called the reporters "very, very premature" and "awfully hypothetical," explaining that the U.S.'s primary interest in Greenland was currently in providing relief for its 17,000 inhabitants if their supply ships from Denmark were cut off. The president also took a question about television. He said that while it had "a great future", the FCC still needed to work out the matter of monopoly prevention to ensure that no single company would control it.
- German submarine U-103 was commissioned.
- The Alfred Hitchcock-directed psychological-thriller mystery film Rebecca premiered in the United States.
- The science fiction horror film Dr. Cyclops was released.
- Born: John Hagee, televangelist, in Goose Creek, Texas; Herbie Hancock, jazz musician, in Chicago, Illinois
- Died: Nestor Nyzhankivsky, 76, Ukrainian composer

== April 13, 1940 (Saturday) ==
- Eight German destroyers and the submarine U-64 were sunk or scuttled in the Second Battle of Narvik.
- RAF Bomber Command mounted aerial minelaying operations for the first time when fifteen Handley Page Hampdens were deployed to lay sea mines off Denmark. There would be a total of 19,917 RAF minelaying sorties over the course of the war.
- The New York Rangers defeated the Toronto Maple Leafs 3–2 in overtime to win hockey's Stanley Cup, four games to two. The Rangers did not win the Cup again until 1994. In the intervening 54 years a superstitious phenomenon known as the Curse of 1940 developed.
- Born: Max Mosley (d. 2021), President of Fédération Internationale de l'Automobile and son of Oswald Mosley, in London.

== April 14, 1940 (Sunday) ==
- The Battle of Dombås began in Norway.
- Norway's King Haakon VII made a radio address telling his people that British soldiers were on their way and should be given any assistance possible.
- 350 Royal Marines landed at Namsos, the first British troops to land in Norway.

== April 15, 1940 (Monday) ==
- The British 146th Infantry Brigade landed at Namsos and started to advance south towards Trondheim. Further north, other British troops landed in the Lofoten Islands.
- The Battle of Hegra Fortress began in Norway.
- Depth charges from British destroyers sank the German submarine U-49 off Narvik. The British recovered a bag from the debris containing secret operational documents including grid charts and a map of the locations of other U-boats in the area.
- Japanese Foreign Minister Arita Hachiro declared that all of Southeast Asia was "economically bound" to Japan and that the Japanese government would be "deeply concerned over any development accompanying an aggravation of the war in Europe that may affect the status quo of the Netherlands East Indies."

== April 16, 1940 (Tuesday) ==
- The British 24th Infantry Brigade landed at Harstad north of Narvik.
- Bob Feller of the Cleveland Indians pitched a 1-0 no-hitter over the Chicago White Sox at Comiskey Park. To date it remains the only major league no-hitter ever pitched on Opening Day.
- Born: Queen Margrethe II of Denmark, in Copenhagen, Denmark
- Died: Charles W. Bartlett, 79, English painter and printmaker

== April 17, 1940 (Wednesday) ==
- The British cruiser HMS Suffolk shelled a German held-airfield at Stavanger, but was attacked by aircraft in return, heavily damaged and put out of action for almost a year.
- U.S. Secretary of State Cordell Hull issued a statement in response to the Japanese declaration of two days earlier. Hull's statement declared, "Any change in the status of the Netherlands Indies would directly affect the interests of many countries. The Netherlands Indies are very important in the international relationships of the whole Pacific Ocean ... They are also an important factor in the commerce of the whole world. They produce considerable portions of the world's supplies of important essential commodities such as rubber, tin, quinine, copra, etc. Many countries, including the United States, depend substantially upon them for some of these commodities." The statement went on to recite a list of international treaties that agreed to respect the rights of the Netherlands in the region.
- The British ocean liner Queen Mary arrived in Sydney to be refitted as a troopship.
- Died: Maria Kaupas, 60, American Catholic Religious Sister and founder of the Sisters of Saint Casimir

== April 18, 1940 (Thursday) ==
- The British 148th Infantry Brigade landed at Åndalsnes.
- The British submarine HMS Sterlet went missing off Norway.
- The German submarine U-99 was commissioned.
- Born: Joseph L. Goldstein, biochemist and Nobel laureate, in Kingstree, South Carolina
- Died: H. A. L. Fisher, 75, English historian and politician; Florrie Forde, 64, Australian popular singer and entertainer; Kid McCoy, 67, American boxer

== April 19, 1940 (Friday) ==
- The Battle of Dombås ended in a Norwegian tactical victory.
- The Germans captured Hamar and Elverum.
- At Verdal, British and German land forces engaged each other for the first time in the war.
- The French 5e Demi-Brigade Chasseurs Alpins arrived in Namsos.
- The Swiss government issued instructions for mobilization in the event of a German invasion.
- Japan told the United States that the Japanese had no aggressive intentions towards the Dutch East Indies.
- A train derailment in Little Falls, New York killed 31 people and injured almost 140.
- Gérard Côté won the Boston Marathon.
- Born: Reinhard Bonnke, German Pentecostal evangelist (d. 2019)

== April 20, 1940 (Saturday) ==
- The British 148th Infantry Brigade arrived at Lillehammer and began moving south. The British supply base at Namsos came under bombing from German forces, but there was little the British could do to fight back as they were short on anti-aircraft weaponry.
- On his 51st birthday, Hitler ordered the creation of the first Scandinavian SS unit, named SS-Verfügungstruppe Standarte Nordland.
- German submarine U-120 was commissioned.
- Born: George Andrie, NFL defensive end, in Grand Rapids, Michigan (d. 2018)

== April 21, 1940 (Sunday) ==
- German troops landed at Verdal and Kirknessvag, threatening to encircle the British 146th Infantry Brigade near Trondheim.
- Take It or Leave It, the forerunner to the popular quiz show The $64,000 Question, premiered on CBS radio.
- Died: Walter J. Kohler Sr., 65, American businessman and politician; Robert M. Losey, 31, American aeronautical meteorologist considered to be the first U.S. military casualty of World War II (killed in the German bombardment of Norway)

== April 22, 1940 (Monday) ==
- General Carton de Wiart ordered the British 146th Infantry Brigade to withdraw to Namsos to avoid being encircled by the Germans.
- The Anglo-French Supreme War Council met again in Paris. The meeting was characterized by infighting between French Prime Minister Paul Reynaud and his war minister Édouard Daladier.

== April 23, 1940 (Tuesday) ==
- The Battle of Gratangen began in Norway.
- The British 148th Brigade tried to make a stand at the strategic village of Tretten, but was too tired and underequipped to hold back the German onslaught. By the end of the day, the brigade retreated.
- The Rhythm Club fire in Natchez, Mississippi killed 209 people.
- On Budget Day in the United Kingdom, Chancellor of the Exchequer Sir John Simon announced that the government was seeking an all-time record £1.234 billion in revenue to meet the cost of the war through March 1941. Taxes and duties were increased on income, alcohol, tobacco, telephone calls, telegrams of "ordinary priority" and postage.
- The Norwegian Nobel Institute in Oslo was visited by a German officer who expressed his intention to take over the building, but was told that it belonged to the Nobel Foundation in Stockholm and was therefore Swedish property. Nevertheless, the wartime situation made the Nobel Committee's regular activities difficult to conduct and so there would be not be any Nobel Prizes awarded for 1940, 1941 or 1942, and no ceremony until 1944 when a special one was held in New York City.
- Pee Wee Reese made his major league baseball debut for the Brooklyn Dodgers, going 1-for-3 against the Chicago Cubs.
- Helsinki forfeited the 1940 Summer Olympics.
- Born: Jaime Bateman Cayón, guerrilla leader, in Santa Marta, Colombia (d. 1983)

== April 24, 1940 (Wednesday) ==
- Troops of the British 15th Infantry Brigade landed at Åndalsnes.
- The Nazis appointed Josef Terboven Reichskommissar of Occupied Norwegian Territories.
- Issue #1 of the comic book Batman was published, starring the character of the same name who was already popular from his appearances in other comics over the previous year. This first issue marked the first appearances of the Joker and Catwoman (initially called The Cat).

== April 25, 1940 (Thursday) ==
- The Battle of Gratangen ended in German victory.
- The British 15th Infantry Brigade repulsed an assault of the 196th Division of the Wehrmacht at Kvam.
- U.S. President Roosevelt recognized the state of war between Germany and Norway and reaffirmed American neutrality in the conflict. Norwegian submarines were added to the list of belligerent ships forbidden from entering American territorial waters.
- The Norwegian torpedo boat Trygg was sunk by German bomber planes. The Germans later salvaged it and put it back into service as the Zick.
- A bomb or land mine exploded in Dublin Castle, wounding five detectives slightly. Taoiseach Éamon de Valera inspected the damage.
- Women gained the right to vote in the Canadian province of Quebec, the last province to grant women's suffrage.
- Born: Al Pacino, actor and filmmaker, in Manhattan, New York

== April 26, 1940 (Friday) ==
- The British 15th Brigade fell back 3 kilometers to Kjorem after their supplies were destroyed by a full day of bombing from the Germans, who had complete air superiority. London began seriously considering a complete withdrawal from Norway.
- The Norwegian destroyer Garm was sunk by German bomber planes.
- Born:
  - Stone Johnson, United States Olympic sprinter and Kansas City Chiefs kick returner and running back; in Dallas, Texas (d. 1963)
  - Giorgio Moroder, record producer and songwriter; in Urtijëi, Italy
- Died: Carl Bosch, 65, German chemist, engineer and Nobel laureate

== April 27, 1940 (Saturday) ==
- Germany finally declared war on Norway. Joachim von Ribbentrop took to the airwaves shortly afterward and claimed that the Germans had captured documents from the Lillehammer sector revealing a British and French plan to occupy Norway with Norwegian complicity. That same day Samuel Hoare made a radio address of his own in which he called Ribbentrop's assertion "despicable."
- The Luftwaffe bombed Namsos. The order was given to evacuate the port.
- The British 15th Brigade fell back another 15 kilometers to Otta while the Germans captured the valley of Østerdalen.
- Reinhard Heydrich ordered the deportation of 2500 German Sinti to the General Government.
- Heinrich Himmler ordered the creation of a new concentration camp at Oświęcim, known in German as Auschwitz.
- German submarine U-102 was commissioned.

== April 28, 1940 (Sunday) ==
- The British government ordered troops at Trondheim to withdraw as the 15th Brigade fell back again to Dombås.
- The U.S. Supreme Court decided Thornhill v. Alabama.
- Died: Luisa Tetrazzini, 68, Italian soprano

== April 29, 1940 (Monday) ==
- Allied destroyers were dispatched from Scapa Flow to evacuate to the British troops from Namsos.
- The British submarine HMS Unity was sunk in an accidental collision with the Norwegian ship Atle Jarl off the mouth of the River Tyne.
- The British Commonwealth Air Training Plan began in Canada, Australia and New Zealand.
- U.S. President Roosevelt sent Benito Mussolini a telegram that said, "I earnestly hope that the powerful influence of Italy and of the United States — an influence which is very strong so long as they remain at peace — may yet be exercised, when the appropriate opportunity is presented in behalf of the negotiation of a just and stable peace which will permit of the reconstruction of a gravely stricken world."
- The three-act play There Shall Be No Night by Robert E. Sherwood premiered at the Neil Simon Theatre in New York City.
- Born: George Adams, jazz musician, in Covington, Georgia (d. 1992)

== April 30, 1940 (Tuesday) ==
- The German 196th Division captured Dombås as the British retreated to Åndalsnes.
- The British sloop HMS Bittern was severely damaged off Namsos by German dive-bombers. Allied ships rescued the survivors and then scuttled the ship with a torpedo from the destroyer HMS Janus.
- Off Greenock, Scotland, the French destroyer Maillé Brézé was sunk by an accidental explosion.
- The British minesweeper HMS Dunoon struck a mine and sank near Great Yarmouth.
- Tex Carleton of the Brooklyn Dodgers pitched a 3-0 no-hitter against the Cincinnati Reds.
- Born: Roger Dean, Australian rules footballer, in Richmond, Victoria, Australia
- Died: Henryk Dobrzański, 42, Polish Army officer and resistance fighter (killed in an ambush)
