= Neal Pilson =

American sports media executive

- Born: April 18, 1940 (age 86); New York City, New York
- Education: Hamilton College; Yale Law School
- Occupations: Sports Media Executive & Consultant
- Employer(s): CBS Sports; Pilson Communications, Inc. Columbia University
- Spouse: Frieda Pilson
- Children: Michael; Dana; Julie
- Awards: Olympic Order; Sports Broadcasting Hall of Fame

Neal Pilson (born April 18, 1940) is the founder and president of Pilson Communications, Inc., a consulting company specializing in sports television, media and marketing. Pilson was also the president of CBS Sports during the 1980s and early 1990s. He currently serves as a selectman on the town board of Richmond, Massachusetts, and is an adjunct professor at Columbia University's School of Professional Studies.

== Early life and education ==
Neal Pilson was born on April 18, 1940, in New York City to Alfred Pilson, later a CFO of Simplicity Pattern Company, Inc., and Hilda Pilson (née Archer).

He attended Hamilton College in Clinton, New York, from 1956 to 1960, where he played varsity basketball. Pilson received an A.B. in history upon his graduation in 1960 and was selected to Phi Beta Kappa. Soon after completing his degree at Hamilton College, he enrolled at Yale Law School, where he graduated with an LL.B in 1963.

== Career ==
After completing his studies at Yale Law School, Pilson worked at private law practices in New York City, where he was responsible for writing up contracts and doing similar work that became very useful in his later career. He soon transitioned to a role at the law department of Metromedia, where he was responsible for writing up and negotiating contracts for various TV and radio broadcasting organizations.

When Metromedia closed down its entertainment division, Pilson transitioned to a new role at the law department of the William Morris Agency. He left this role after just a few years when CBS offered him work in their sports division.

At the same time, Pilson was offered a role at HBO, which he turned down in order to accept his position at CBS. When he turned down the role at HBO, he encouraged the company to hire Michael Fuchs, his William Morris Agency colleague, instead. Fuchs later became the president, CEO, and chairman at HBO, retiring in 1995 with a golden parachute that was rumored to be around $50 million. As Pilson said in an interview with the Manchester Journal, "whenever I see [Fuchs], he says, 'I owe you.'"

=== CBS sports career ===
In 1976, Pilson joined CBS Sports as the director of business affairs. A few years later, in 1981, he began his first of 2 terms (1981–1983 and 1986–1994) as the president of CBS Sports. He was initially tapped to lead CBS Sports as president after the division had gone through a tumultuous series of 4 presidents in 5 years and needed a way to finally lead ABC and NBC in sports broadcasting.

In between his two terms as president, Pilson was the Executive Vice President of the CBS Broadcast Group from 1983 to 1986. As Pilson stated, this new role "was a bigger deal, more money, a car and a driver, and better access to the company plane, but it wasn't as much fun."

During his time at CBS, Pilson oversaw a period of great transition within the sports broadcasting world.

Throughout his presidency with company, he helped to negotiated a number of major broadcast agreements with CBS's most important sports franchises, which included the World Figure Skating Championships, PGA, the US Open Tennis, The Masters, NASCAR NCAA Basketball, MLB and the NFL.

Pilson also helped CBS acquire the domestic television broadcast rights to the 1992, 1994, and 1998 Olympic Winter Games during his second term. The 1994 Olympic Games in Lillehammer, Norway, were of particular note as the excellent ratings for the games were, in part, driven by the Nancy Kerrigan-Tonya Harding saga.

He was also instrumental in the launch of flag-to-flag live coverage of high-profile NASCAR races, starting with the 1979 Daytona 500, which had been, until that point, mostly relegated to the world of post-race coverage on ABC.

While at CBS, Pilson's production unit won a number of Emmy Awards for their coverage of major sporting events, including multiple NCAA Final Four Tournaments, the Daytona 500, NFL Football, and Major League Baseball. CBS also won the George Foster Peabody Award for their coverage of The Masters during his tenure.

Pilson was also involved in the firing of sports commentator Jimmy the Greek in 1988 after Jimmy made racists comments at a Washington, D.C., restaurant.

Towards the end of his tenure as CBS Sports president, CBS lost the rights to both MLB and the NFL's NFC package, being outbid on the latter by Fox. In 1994, Pilson transitioned into a new role at CBS as the Senior Vice President of the CBS Broadcast Group, a position he held until 1995.

=== Post-CBS sports career ===
After departing from CBS, Pilson launched his own consultancy firm, Pilson Communications, Inc.

One of Pilson's first clients after starting his own firm was Bill France Jr., the NASCAR legend with whom Pilson had negotiated millions of dollars' worth of deals during his time at CBS. Ironically, France Jr. hired Pilson Communications, Inc. to help him renegotiate some of the many deals that Pilson had created with NASCAR through his previous role with CBS. When France Jr. learned that Pilson was leaving CBS, he said, "Great. I'm going to hire you as my consultant, and I want to go back into CBS and get all the money that you've been holding out on me over the last 15 or 20 years."

Pilson has worked with a wide array of clients through his consultancy firm, including:

- Arena Football League
- NASCAR
- Kentucky Derby
- Rose Bowl
- World Series of Poker
- International Olympic Committee
- Women's Tennis Association
- Major League Baseball
- NCAA
- Daytona International Speedway
- IRG Sports + Entertainment

In his post-CBS career, Pilson was a senior advisor for the Sports Finance Group at UBS AG since 2004.

Pilson is a prolific speaker, panelist, and moderator at sports-related events around the world. He has spoken at a large number of events and for dozens of organizations, including:

- Motorsports Hall of Fame Induction Ceremony
- Knight Commission on Intercollegiate Athletics
- Sports Video Group Conference
- Wharton Business School Digital Media Panel
- Paley Center Dialogue on Sports and Media
- National Association of Collegiate Directors of Athletics Conference
- NBA Players Association
- World Congress of Sports
- New York Law Journal Sports Seminar
- Hamilton College
- Yale Law School
- Washington University
- Fordham University
- Columbia University

Due to his extensive experience in sports broadcasting, Neal has served as an expert witness in a number of high-profile cases in the sports industry. These include cases such as the USFL v. NFL lawsuit, O'Bannon v. NCAA class-action lawsuit, the Horizon Sports Management v. Rory McIlroy lawsuit, and the NFL v. NFLPA lawsuit over work-stoppage payments.

Outside of his work with Pilson Communications, Inc., Neal teaches Leadership and Personnel Management, which was co-taught with Val Ackerman for several years, in Columbia University's Master of Science in Sports Management Program.

At various times during his career, Neal Pilson has also served as an elected official at the municipal level. He is a former village trustee of the town of Ardsley, New York, and has served as a town selectmen for the town of Richmond, Massachusetts, since 2016.

== Philanthropy ==
Neal Pilson and his wife, Frieda, have long supported a number of major charitable organizations and educational institutions.

Pilson was the chairman and president of the executive committee of the Yale Law School Association, which works to strengthen ties between the school and the community at large.

He also served as a board member of the USA Hockey Foundation and was active for a long time with the Chicago-based USA Deaf Hockey Program (now AHIHA). Pilson was also a member of the NTID Foundation, which works to garner financial support for the National Technical Institute for the Deaf, a college within the Rochester Institute of Technology (RIT) in Rochester, New York.

One of Pilson's major philanthropic focuses is the March of Dimes Foundation. He was a board member of the organization's Greater New York Chapter, and, as a result of his work, the March of Dimes Sports Luncheon now raises millions of dollars each year. Pilson also received the 1991 March of Dimes Sports Luncheon Founder's Award in recognition of his work.

Frieda Pilson is also a former president of the Katonah Museum of Art's board of trustees. She also served as a director of the National Theater of the Deaf in Chester, Connecticut, and as a member of the historical commission of the town of Richmond, Massachusetts.

== Personal life ==
Neal Pilson married his wife, Frieda Pilson (née Rudman), in 1962. Together, Neal and Frieda have 3 adult children and 6 grandchildren. Their son, Michael Pilson, won a gold medal in ice hockey at the 1995 World Winter Games for the Deaf in Ylläs, Finland.

Over the course of his career, they lived in Ardsley, New York, and Chappaqua, New York, before settling in Richmond, Massachusetts.

== Awards and recognition ==
Throughout his career, Neal Pilson has earned a number of major awards and honors, including:

- 1991: March of Dimes Sports Luncheon Founder's Award
- 1994: Olympic Order from the IOC
- 2004: Named to The 20 Most Influential People: Sports Media
- 2010: Named to the first class of "The Champions" of Leadership and Success by IMG World Congress of Sports
- 2018: Inducted into the Sports Broadcasting Hall of Fame
