= March 1940 =

Month of 1940

<<	March 1940					>>
Su	Mo	Tu	We	Th	Fr	Sa
					1	2
3	4	5	6	7	8	9
10	11	12	13	14	15	16
17	18	19	20	21	22	23
24	25	26	27	28	29	30
31

The following events occurred in March 1940:

== March 1, 1940 (Friday) ==
- In Germany, the second stop of U.S. Undersecretary of State Sumner Welles' fact-finding mission, he met with Joachim von Ribbentrop and listened to him speak almost non-stop for two hours. Welles came away thinking that Ribbentrop had a "completely closed mind" that was "also a very stupid mind."
- The novel Native Son by Richard Wright was published in the United States.
- The adventure film Strange Cargo starring Joan Crawford and Clark Gable (in his next role after Gone with the Wind) was released.
- Born: Nuala O'Faolain, journalist and writer, in Clontarf, Dublin, Ireland (d. 2008)
- Died: Sherman H. Dudley, 67–70?, African-American vaudeville performer; A. H. Tammsaare, 62, Estonian writer

== March 2, 1940 (Saturday) ==
- The British cargo liner Domala was bombed off the Isle of Wight by a Heinkel He 111 with the loss of 108 of the 291 people aboard.
- Sumner Welles went to the Chancellory and met Adolf Hitler, who claimed to want peace but insisted that Britain was determined to destroy Germany. Welles' impression of Hitler was that he appeared to be calm and in excellent health and that "while his eyes were tired, they were clear."
- Hungarians volunteering to fight in the Winter War arrived in Finland after three weeks of travel. They immediately began training with the Finnish Army but would not complete training before the end of Winter War.
- Cambridge won an unofficial Boat Race at Henley-on-Thames.
- The character of Elmer Fudd first appeared in the Warner Bros. animated short Elmer's Candid Camera.

== March 3, 1940 (Sunday) ==
- A bomb exploded in the Luleå offices of the Swedish communist newspaper Norrskensflamman, killing five.
- Sumner Welles met Hermann Göring at Carinhall. Like Hitler, Göring blamed the war on Britain and France. Welles found Göring to be as cold and ruthless as the other Nazi leaders but thought he was at least capable of taking a broader view of international relations.
- Italy sent a note to Britain protesting the British blockade of German coal shipments to Italy.
- Born: Germán Castro Caycedo, journalist and writer, in Zipaquirá, Colombia (d. 2021); Owen Spencer-Thomas, television and radio journalist, in Braughing, Hertfordshire, England

== March 4, 1940 (Monday) ==
- The Home Office announced that women would not be asked to work more than 60 hours a week in British factories, and youth under 16 would not be required to work more than 48. In World War I, women were frequently working as many as 70 hours a week.
- Died: Hamlin Garland, 79, American writer

== March 5, 1940 (Tuesday) ==
- A Finnish delegation departed for Moscow to begin negotiations for a peace settlement.
- Joseph Stalin authorized the Katyn massacre.
- In the English Channel, the Royal Navy seized seven Italian ships leaving Germany loaded with coal.
- Died: Maxine Elliott, 72, American actress and businesswoman; Cai Yuanpei, 72, Chinese educator and philosopher

== March 6, 1940 (Wednesday) ==
- British MPs protested the Land Transfers Regulations, but a motion of censure brought against the government was defeated.
- Simo Häyhä was finally hit by an explosive round in an anti-sniper campaign run by the Soviets, putting him into an 11-day coma.
- Detective Comics #38 was published (cover date April), featuring the first appearance of Batman's sidekick, Robin.
- Born: Willie Stargell, baseball player, in Earlsboro, Oklahoma (d. 2001)

== March 7, 1940 (Thursday) ==
- Sumner Welles visited Paris and met with President Albert François Lebrun. Welles found Lebrun friendly, but was annoyed that he spent much of the meeting rambling on about details of his life that Welles did not find to be "in the slightest degree significant." Welles was then taken to see Prime Minister Édouard Daladier, who stressed that restoration of independence for the Poles and Czechs was a primary objective of any peace settlement. Although Daladier said he deeply distrusted Hitler, he also said he would not rule out dealing with the present German regime.
- The RMS Queen Elizabeth completed her secret maiden voyage from England to New York.
- Ray Steele beat Bronko Nagurski in St. Louis to win the National Wrestling Association World Heavyweight Championship.
- Born: Rudi Dutschke, spokesperson of the German student movement, in Schönefeld, Germany (d. 1979)

== March 8, 1940 (Friday) ==
- Soviet troops pushed into the suburbs of Viipuri while Moscow rejected a Finnish plea for an immediate ceasefire.
- Sumner Welles had separate meetings with Jules Jeanneney and Édouard Herriot, who were both adamant that France would have to continue the war until Germany was defeated.
- Died: Princess Masako Takeda, 51, tenth child of Emperor Meiji of Japan

== March 9, 1940 (Saturday) ==
- The Finns evacuated their last toeholds in the Gulf of Viipuri.
- Britain released the captured Italian coal ships and announced that Italy would be allowed to continue to import German coal, but only via overland routes.
- Born: Raúl Juliá, actor, in San Juan, Puerto Rico (d. 1994)

== March 10, 1940 (Sunday) ==
- Joachim von Ribbentrop arrived in Rome for a two-day meeting with Benito Mussolini. It was agreed that Mussolini would have a face-to-face meeting with Hitler soon to discuss Italy entering the war.
- Sumner Welles flew to London and met with Lord Halifax.
- Hitler gave a speech at the Berlin Zeughaus on Heroes' Memorial Day.
- Born:
  - Chuck Norris, martial artist and actor, in Ryan, Oklahoma (d. 2026)
  - David Rabe, American playwright, in Dubuque, Iowa
  - Dean Torrence, one-half of the rock and roll duo Jan and Dean, in Los Angeles

== March 11, 1940 (Monday) ==
- The French battleship Bretagne and cruiser Algérie departed Toulon with 147 tons worth of gold, bound for Canada where the French gold reserves would be kept for safekeeping.
- German submarine U-31 was sunk in the Jade Bight by British aircraft, the first time a U-boat was sunk from the air. U-31 was later raised by the Germans, repaired and returned to service.
- Sumner Welles had tea with King George VI, who made clear his hope that no peace negotiations would take place until the Nazi regime was destroyed. Welles then spoke with Neville Chamberlain, who reiterated the points from his Birmingham speech of February 24.
- German submarine U-101 was commissioned.
- Died: John Monk Saunders, 42, American novelist, screenwriter and film director (suicide)

== March 12, 1940 (Tuesday) ==
- The Moscow Peace Treaty ending the Winter War was signed. Russia received 16,000 square miles (41,000 km^{2}) of Finnish territory.
- Sumner Welles met Winston Churchill. In Welles' account of the meeting he wrote that "Mr. Churchill was sitting in front of the fire, smoking a 24-inch cigar, and drinking a whiskey and soda. It was quite obvious that he had consumed a good many whiskeys before I arrived." For almost two hours Welles listened to Churchill deliver "a cascade of oratory, brilliant and always effective, interlarded with considerable wit."
- The Republican Party presidential primaries began in New Hampshire.
- German submarine U-99, one of the most successful U-boats of the war, was commissioned.
- Born: Al Jarreau, jazz singer, in Milwaukee, Wisconsin (d. 2017)

== March 13, 1940 (Wednesday) ==
- Hostilities between the Soviet Union and Finland ceased at 11 a.m. The three-month long Battle of Kollaa ended in Finnish victory, though the war was lost.
- Field Marshal Mannerheim addressed the Finnish Army: "Peace has been concluded between our country and the Soviet Union, an exacting peace which has ceded to Russia nearly every battlefield on which you have shed your blood on behalf of everything we hold dear and sacred. You did not want war. You loved peace, work and progress; but you were forced into a struggle in which you have done great deeds, deeds that will shine for centuries in the pages of history."
- Indian nationalist Udham Singh assassinated Sir Michael O'Dwyer (in revenge for the 1919 Jallianwala Bagh massacre) at Caxton Hall in London.
- Born: Candi Staton, soul and gospel singer, in Hanceville, Alabama
- Died: Ira Flagstead, 46, American baseball player

== March 14, 1940 (Thursday) ==
- Evacuation of Finnish Karelia: The more than 450,000 Finns displaced by the Moscow Peace Treaty began to cross Finland's new border. Some burned their homes to the ground to leave as little behind for the Russians as possible.
- Hermann Göring asked Germans to collect metal objects and donate them to the state as a present to Adolf Hitler for his 51st birthday.
- The comedy film Road to Singapore, starring Bing Crosby, Bob Hope and Dorothy Lamour was released. It was the first in the series of the popular Road to ... movies.

== March 15, 1940 (Friday) ==
- Finnish Parliament ratified the Moscow Peace Treaty, 145 to 3.
- Carol II of Romania granted an amnesty to members of the Iron Guard in exchange for their allegiance.
- Born: Phil Lesh, bass guitarist for the Grateful Dead, in Berkeley, California (d. 2024)

== March 16, 1940 (Saturday) ==
- The Battle of Wuyuan began.
- A British civilian was killed in a German air raid for the first time in the war when fourteen Junkers Ju 88 bombers attacked the British fleet at Scapa Flow.
- The foreign ministers of the Baltic states held a conference in Riga. They agreed to share information in order to prevent the Soviet Union from playing them off against each other.
- Sumner Welles, now back in Rome, met with King Victor Emmanuel III in the morning and then Mussolini again that evening. Welles thought that Mussolini seemed to be in better spirits than he was at their first meeting.
- Born: Bernardo Bertolucci, film director and screenwriter, in Parma, Italy (d. 2018); Jan Pronk, politician and diplomat, in Scheveningen, Netherlands; James Wong, Cantopop lyricist, in Panyu, Guangzhou, China (d. 2004)
- Died: Selma Lagerlöf, 81, Swedish author and Nobel laureate in literature

== March 17, 1940 (Sunday) ==
- Major league baseball held a special spring training all-star game in Tampa, Florida to support the people of Finland. The exhibition raised more than $20,000 for the Finnish Relief Fund. The National League won the game 2-1 when Pete Coscarart of the Dodgers hit a walk-off single off Bob Feller in the bottom of the ninth.
- Born: Mark White, 43rd Governor of Texas, in Longview, Texas (d. 2017)

== March 18, 1940 (Monday) ==
- Hitler met with Mussolini at the Brenner Pass in the Alps. Hitler made it clear that German troops were poised to launch an offensive in the west and that Mussolini would have to decide whether Italy would join in the attack or not. Since Italy was still not ready for war, Mussolini suggested that the offensive could be delayed a few more months, to which Hitler replied that Germany was not altering its plans to suit Italy. The two agreed that Italy would come into the war in due course.
- Sumner Welles and Myron Charles Taylor met Pope Pius XII. Taylor asked the pope if there would be revolution in Italy should Mussolini bring the country into the war. The pope seemed surprised at the question and after careful consideration replied that Italian public opinion was overwhelmingly against joining the war, but that there would not be any rebellion for at least some time if Italy did enter.

== March 19, 1940 (Tuesday) ==
- In retaliation for the air raid on Scapa Flow, the RAF attacked the German seaplane bases of Sylt and Hornum.
- Harold Macmillan sparred with Neville Chamberlain in the House of Commons over whether the government had done all it could to help Finland.

== March 20, 1940 (Wednesday) ==
- The entire French cabinet resigned. Although Prime Minister Daladier won a vote of confidence in the Chamber of Deputies 239-1, there were so many abstentions among the 551 members that he recognized the vote as a defeat.
- Sumner Welles ended his diplomatic tour of Europe and boarded a ship heading back to the United States.
- Died: Alfred Ploetz, 79, German physician, biologist and eugenicist

== March 21, 1940 (Thursday) ==
- Paul Reynaud became Prime Minister of France.
- The ocean liner Queen Mary departed New York City for Sydney to be refitted as a troopship.
- Woody Guthrie was recorded for the first time, in an interview with Alan Lomax for the Library of Congress during which he also performed some original and traditional songs.
- The Alberta Social Credit Party led by William Aberhart won a second term in the Alberta general election, although it lost seats from its 1935 landslide.
- Born: Solomon Burke, soul musician and preacher, in Philadelphia (d. 2010)

== March 22, 1940 (Friday) ==
- Soviet military personnel began to arrive in the Finnish port of Hanko, which had been leased to the Soviets for 30 years as part of the Moscow Peace Treaty.
- Born: Dave Keon, ice hockey player, in Noranda, Quebec, Canada; Haing S. Ngor, physician, actor and author, in Samrong Yong, Cambodia, French Indochina (d. 1996)

== March 23, 1940 (Saturday) ==
- The Lahore Resolution was adopted by the All-India Muslim League.
- Twelve Irish Republican Army convicts rioted in HM Prison Dartmoor. The inmates took two warders prisoner, locked a third one in a cell and started a fire that took 90 minutes to put out.
- The quiz show Truth or Consequences premiered on NBC Radio.

== March 24, 1940 (Sunday) ==
- The French destroyer La Railleuse was sunk off Casablanca by the accidental explosion of one of its own torpedoes. 28 crewmen were killed and 24 wounded.

== March 25, 1940 (Monday) ==
- The British government ordered its troops not to participate in German radio broadcasts if they became prisoners of war. Britons had been tuning in to German radio to learn of the capture of family members by hearing their voices, long before information of their capture could reach the British government.
- The U.S. Supreme Court decided Helvering v. Bruun.
- Born: Anita Bryant, singer and anti-gay rights activist, in Barnsdall, Oklahoma (d. 2024); Mina, singer, in Busto Arsizio, Italy

== March 26, 1940 (Tuesday) ==
- A federal election was held in Canada. The Liberal government of William Lyon Mackenzie King was re-elected to another majority government.
- Born:
  - James Caan, actor, in the Bronx, New York (d. 2022)
  - Nancy Pelosi, 52nd Speaker of the U.S. House of Representatives, in Baltimore, Maryland
- Died: Spyridon Louis, 67, Greek runner, winner of the marathon at the 1896 Summer Olympics

== March 27, 1940 (Wednesday) ==
- Peter Fraser became the new Prime Minister of New Zealand when Michael Joseph Savage died in office from cancer.
- The German submarine U-22 went missing in the North Sea, possibly lost to a naval mine.
- Born: Lindy Infante, American football player and coach, in Miami (d. 2015), Austin Pendleton, Actor, in Warren, Ohio
- Died: Michael Joseph Savage, 68, 23rd Prime Minister of New Zealand

== March 28, 1940 (Thursday) ==
- The Anglo-French Supreme War Council met in London and agreed that neither Britain nor France would make a separate peace with Germany. The Council also agreed upon Operation Wilfred, a plan to lay mines in Norwegian coastal waters in the hopes of provoking a German response that would legitimize Allied "assistance" to Norway.

== March 29, 1940 (Friday) ==
- Vyacheslav Molotov made a speech to the Supreme Soviet of the Soviet Union reviewing the foreign situation and the Winter War. Molotov accused Britain and France of planning to use Finland as a staging ground to attack the USSR and said that the pacts with the Baltic states were "being carried out in satisfactory manner and this creates premises for a further improvement in relations between the Soviet Union and these states."
- Born: Ray Davis, bass singer and one of the founding members of the doo-wop group The Parliaments, in Sumter, South Carolina (d. 2005); Astrud Gilberto, samba and bossa nova singer, in Salvador, Bahia, Brazil (d. 2023)
- Died: Alexander Obolensky, 24, Russian-born British footballer (plane crash)

== March 30, 1940 (Saturday) ==
- Wang Jingwei became the head of a new collaborationist government in China that would be known as the Reorganized National Government of the Republic of China.
- As part of preparations for Operation Pike, a British reconnaissance flight from a base in Iraq flew unchallenged for several hours over Soviet oilfields on the Absheron Peninsula.
- German submarine U-122 was commissioned.
- Indiana beat Kansas 60-42 in the Championship Game of the NCAA Division I men's basketball tournament
- "When You Wish upon a Star" by Ray Eberle & Glenn Miller topped the American pop charts as compiled by Your Hit Parade.
- Born: Jerry Lucas, basketball player and memory education expert, in Middletown, Ohio
- Died: Sir John Gilmour, 2nd Baronet, 63, Scottish politician and Minister of Shipping

== March 31, 1940 (Sunday) ==
- Winston Churchill gave a speech over the radio titled "Dwelling in the Cage with the Tiger", a metaphor he used to describe the precarious geographical situation of the Dutch. As with his January 20 speech, Churchill primarily spoke about neutral countries and said, "It might have been a very short war, perhaps, indeed, there might have been no war, if all the neutral States, who share our conviction upon fundamental matters, and who openly or secretly sympathize with us, had stood together at one signal and in one line. We did not count on this, we did not expect it, and therefore we are not disappointed or dismayed ... But the fact is that many of the smaller States of Europe are terrorized by Nazi violence and brutality into supplying Germany with the material of modern war, and this fact may condemn the whole world to a prolonged ordeal with grievous, unmeasured consequences in many lands." In the wake of the Altmark Incident and with Operation Wilfred about to go into action, Churchill said of Germany's neutral neighbors that "we understand their dangers and their point of view, but it would not be right, or in the general interest, that their weakness should be the aggressor's strength, and fill to overflowing the cup of human woe. There could be no justice if in a moral struggle the aggressor tramples down every sentiment of humanity, and if those who resist him remain entangled in the tatters of violated legal conventions."
- The Karelo-Finnish Soviet Socialist Republic was established.
- Britain introduced paper rationing to publishing and printing industries.
- Born: Barney Frank, politician, in Bayonne, New Jersey (d. 2026)
