= Art Ross Trophy =

Ice hockey award

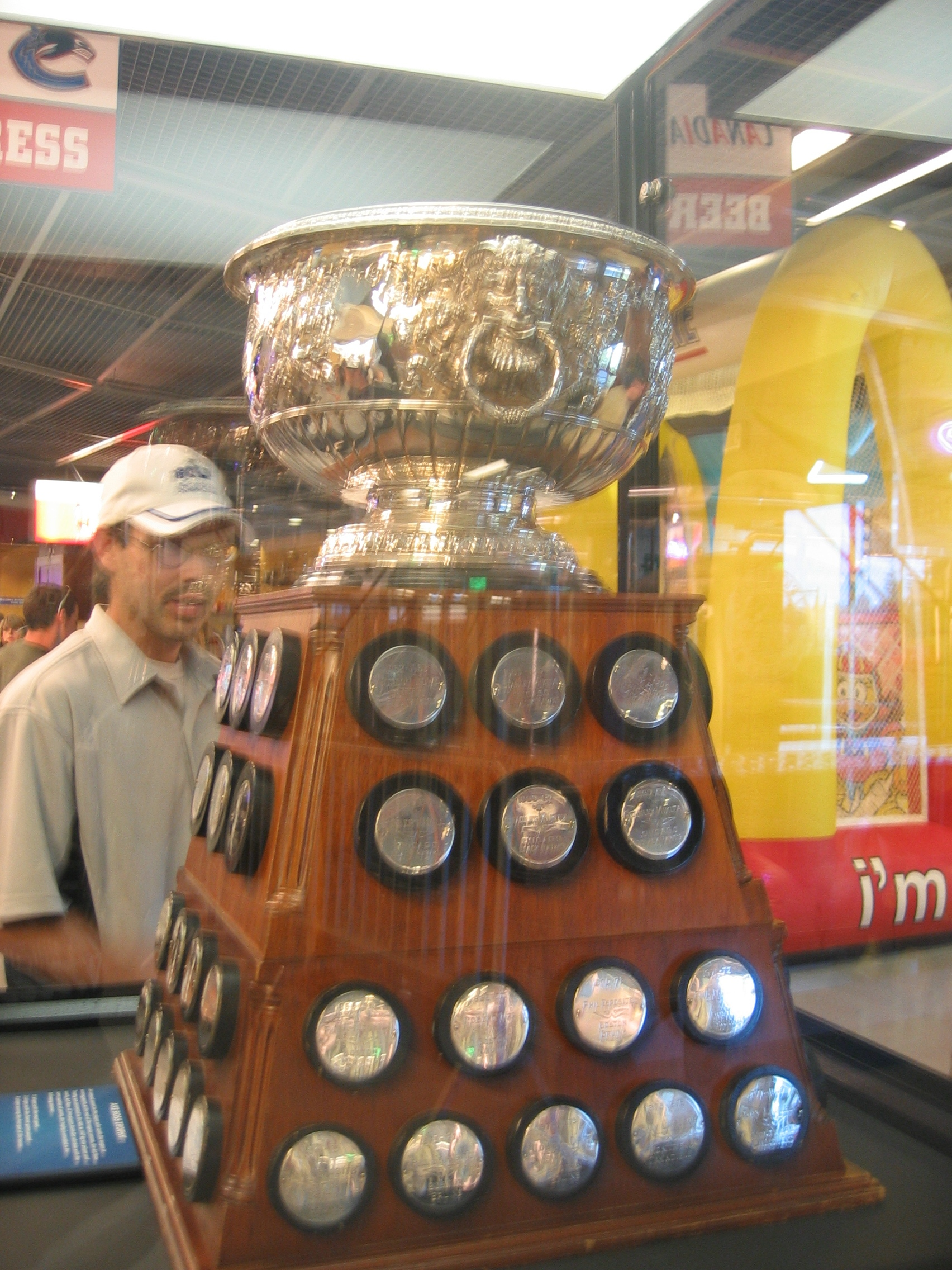
- Sport: Ice hockey
- Awarded for: "Player who leads the League in points at the end of the regular season."

History
- First award: 1947–48 NHL season
- First winner: Elmer Lach
- Most wins: Wayne Gretzky (10)
- Most recent: Connor McDavid (6); Edmonton Oilers

The Art Ross Trophy is awarded to the National Hockey League (NHL) player who leads the league in points at the end of the regular season. It was presented to the league by former player, general manager, and head coach Art Ross. The trophy has been awarded 71 times to 29 players since its introduction in the 1947–48 NHL season. Ross is also known for his design of the official NHL puck, with slightly bevelled edges for better control.

The current holder is Connor McDavid of the Edmonton Oilers.

== History ==
The Art Ross Trophy was presented to the National Hockey League (NHL) in 1947 by Arthur Howey "Art" Ross, former general manager and head coach of the Boston Bruins and Hockey Hall of Fame inductee as a player. Elmer Lach of the Montreal Canadiens was awarded the first Art Ross Trophy at the conclusion of the 1947–48 season.

Players from the Pittsburgh Penguins won the trophy 15 times and the Edmonton Oilers have won the trophy 14 times, while the Montreal Canadiens and Chicago Blackhawks are tied for third with nine times each. Although Joe Thornton, winner from the 2005–06 season, started the season playing for the Boston Bruins, he finished with the San Jose Sharks and the award counts for the Sharks. Therefore, Boston Bruins have seven players winning the trophy, fifth overall.

From 1951 to 2001, Jean Beliveau, Marcel Dionne, and Bryan Trottier were the only single-time winners of the scoring title, while Gordie Howe, Bernie Geoffrion, Dickie Moore, Bobby Hull, Stan Mikita, Phil Esposito, Bobby Orr, Guy Lafleur, Wayne Gretzky, Mario Lemieux, and Jaromir Jagr all won it on multiple occasions. For two decades, from 1981 to 2001, only three players won the Art Ross Trophy: Gretzky, Lemieux, and Jagr. The streak ended when Jarome Iginla won the trophy in 2002.

Gretzky has won the trophy a record ten times, seven consecutively, during his 20-year NHL career. Gordie Howe, Lemieux and McDavid have each won it six times, while Esposito and Jagr each have five. Jagr, from the Czech Republic, has won the award the most times as a non-Canadian. Patrick Kane is the only American-born player to win the trophy, doing so in 2016. Gretzky is the only player to win the trophy for more than one team, while Thornton is the only player to win it while playing for two different teams in one season. Stan Mikita is the only player in NHL history to win the Art Ross, Hart, and Lady Byng Trophies all in the same season, which he did twice (1966–67 and 1967–68, with Chicago; Gretzky, Bobby Hull, and Martin St. Louis all won each of those awards at least once and won a combination of two of them in the same season, but never all three together). Orr is the only defenseman to win the scoring title, doing so in 1970 and 1975 with Boston, and in 1970 he became the first player to capture four individual awards in a single season as he won the Hart, Norris, and Conn Smythe Trophies that year as well.

In 2007, Sidney Crosby became the youngest player to win the Art Ross Trophy at age 19, and also became the youngest scoring champion in any major North American professional sport. At almost twice Crosby's age, Martin St. Louis became the oldest player to capture the Art Ross at the age of 37, also having the longest gap between scoring titles (nine years). Henrik and Daniel Sedin are the only siblings to win the award, in 2010 and 2011, respectively. Since 2001, only five players, Connor McDavid, Crosby, Evgeni Malkin, St. Louis and Nikita Kucherov have won the award more than once: Crosby in 2007 and 2014, Malkin in 2009 and 2012, St. Louis in 2004 and 2013, McDavid in 2017, 2018, 2021, 2022, 2023 and 2026 and Kucherov in 2019, 2024 and 2025. McDavid and Gretzky are the only players to win multiple Art Ross trophies before age 21.

The NHL rules stipulate three tiebreakers in case two or more players are tied in points:

1. Player with most goals
2. Player with fewer games played
3. Player scoring first goal of the season

Scoring ties happened in the 1961–62, 1979–80, and 1994–95 seasons, all of them being decided by the first tiebreaker of scoring more goals. In those respective seasons, Hull won over Andy Bathgate, Dionne over Gretzky, and Jagr over Eric Lindros. The NHL's award to recognize the leading goal-scorer, the Maurice "Rocket" Richard Trophy, does not have a tiebreaker, allowing multiple winners to be recognized in any one season.

== Winners ==
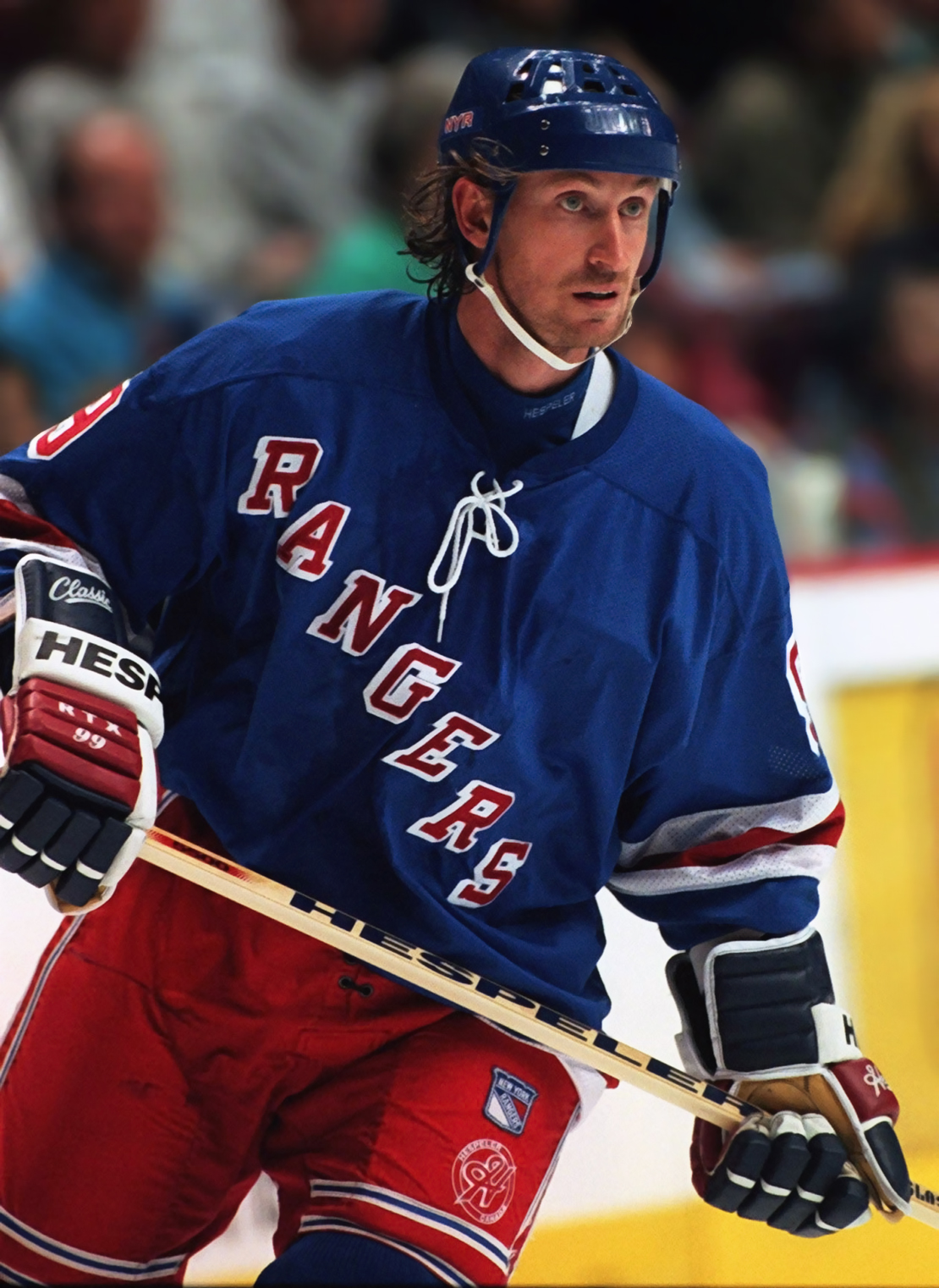
Wayne Gretzky, record ten-time winner

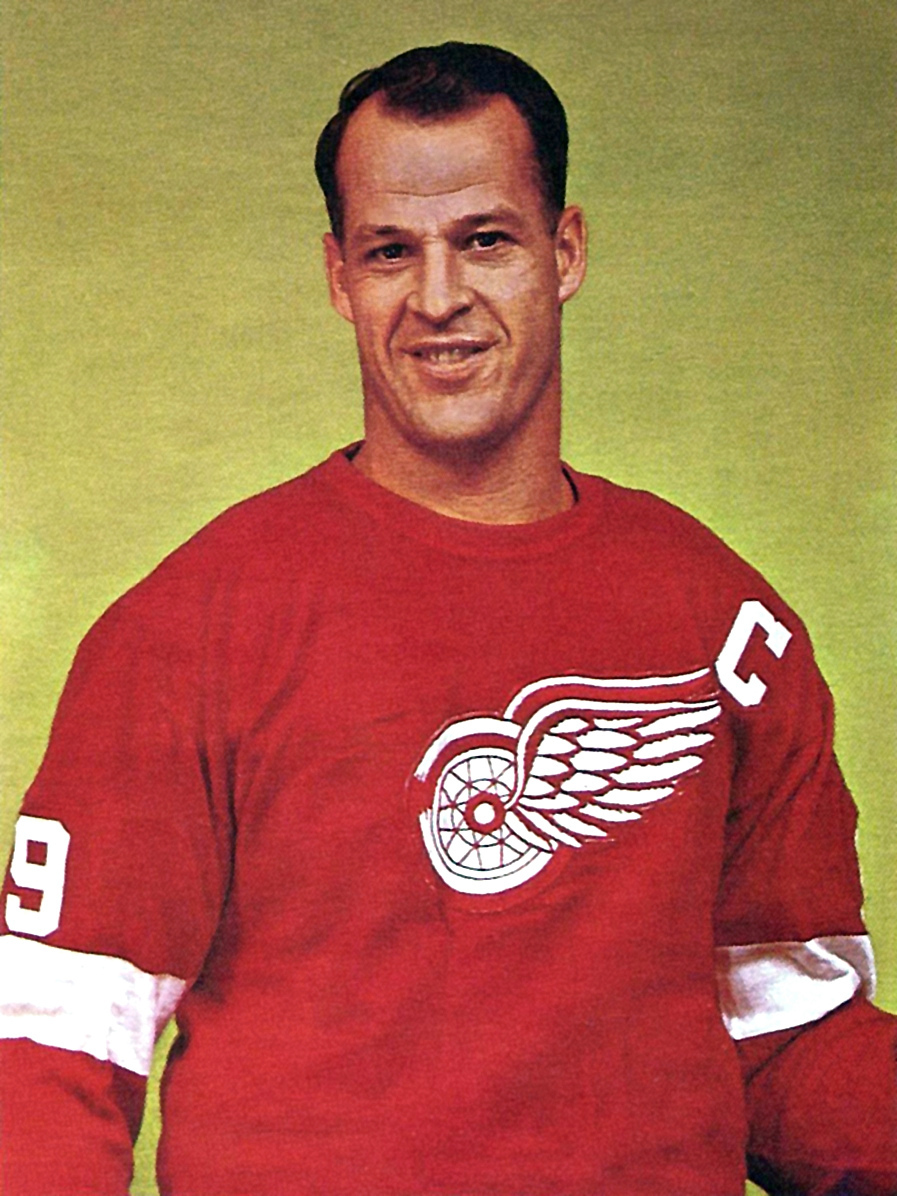
Gordie Howe, six-time winner

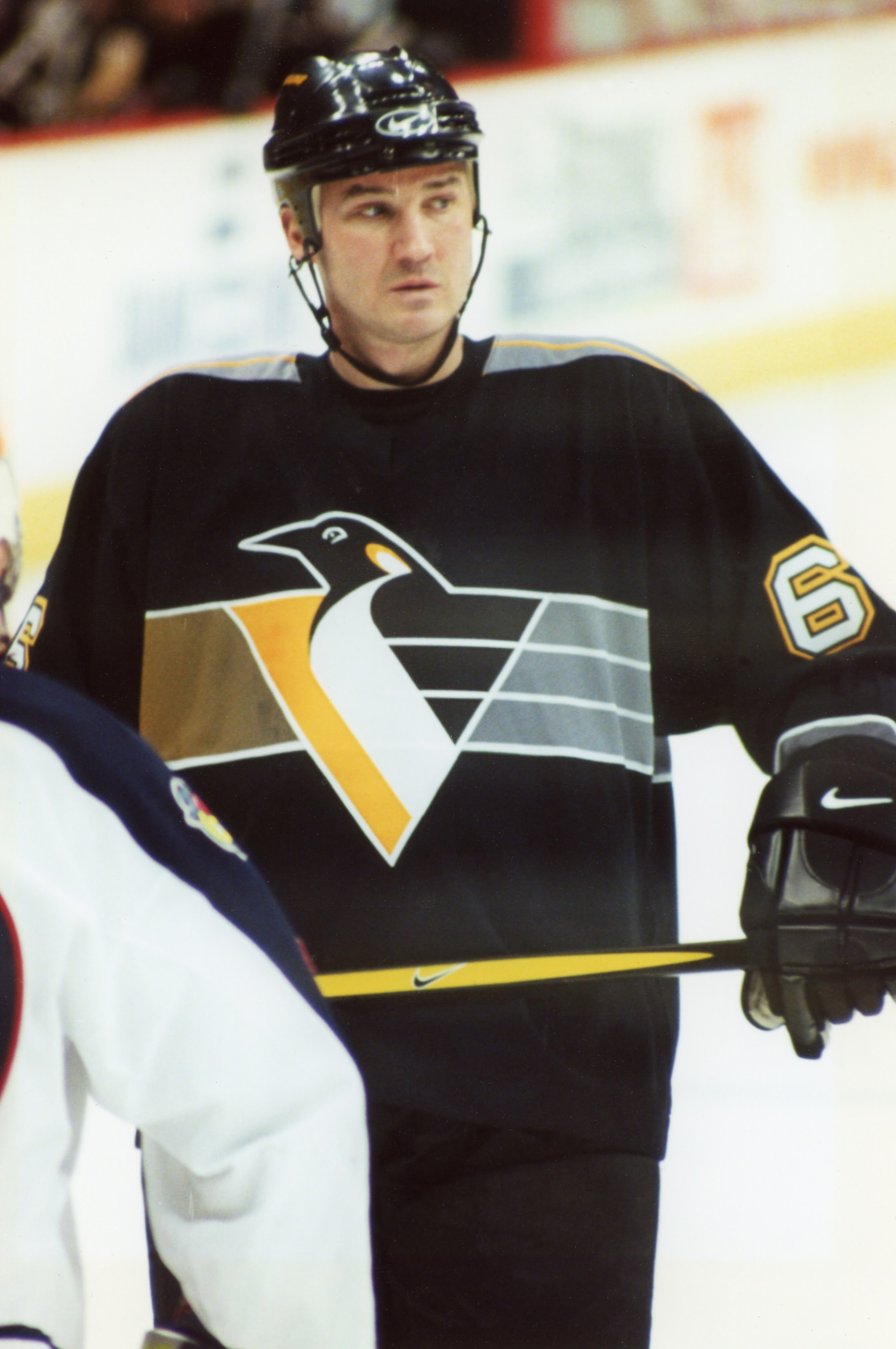
Mario Lemieux, six-time winner

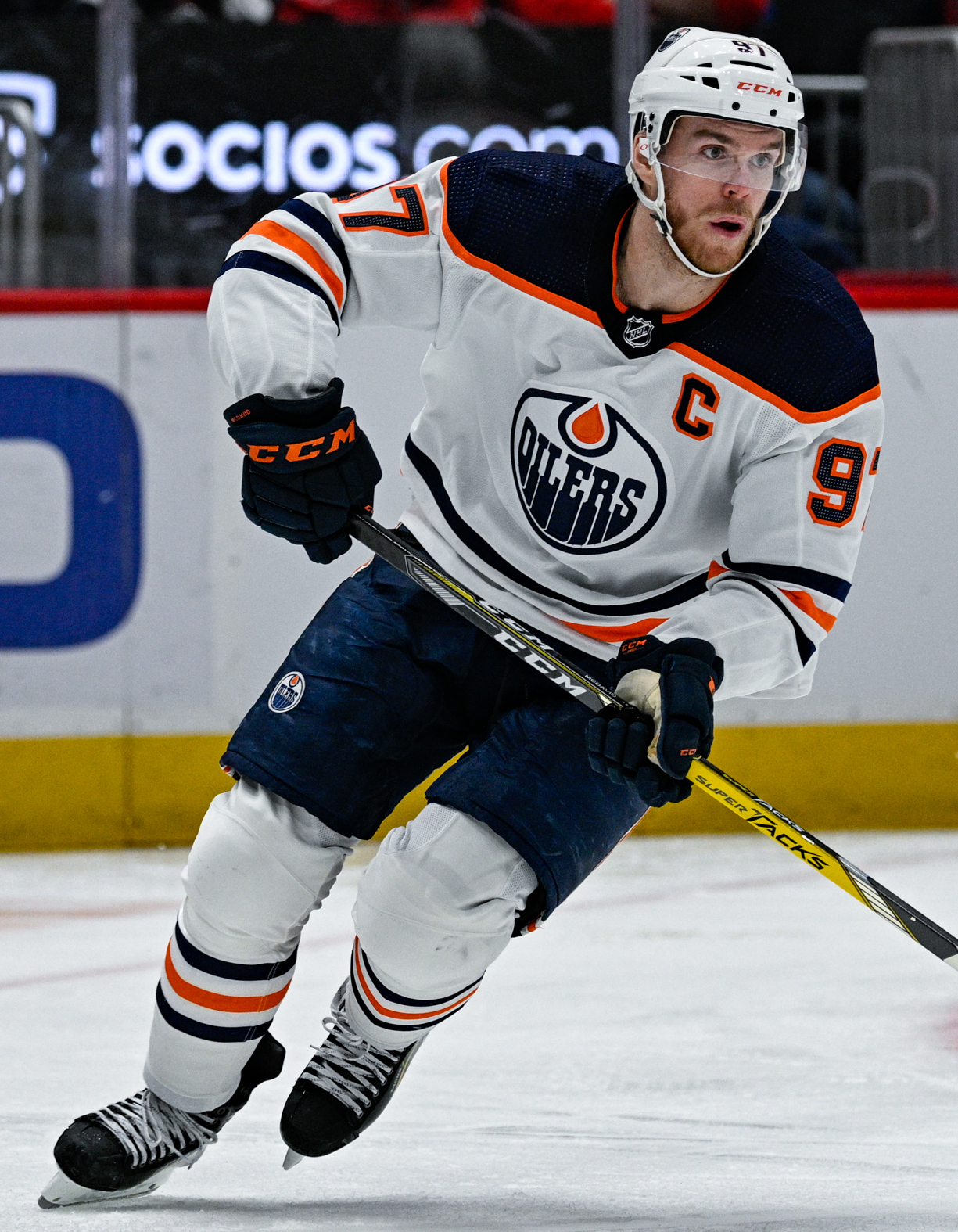
Connor McDavid, six-time winner

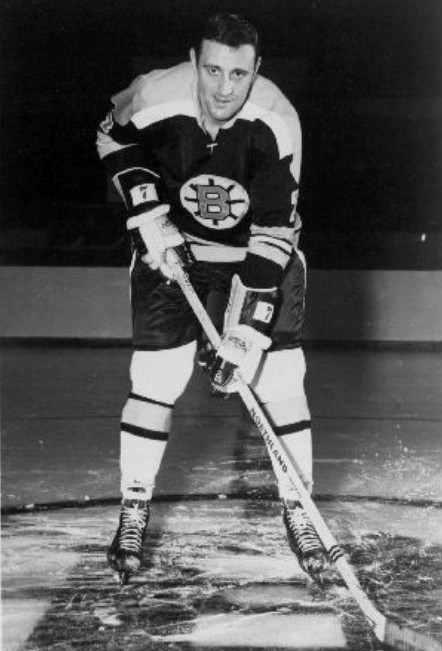
Phil Esposito, five-time winner

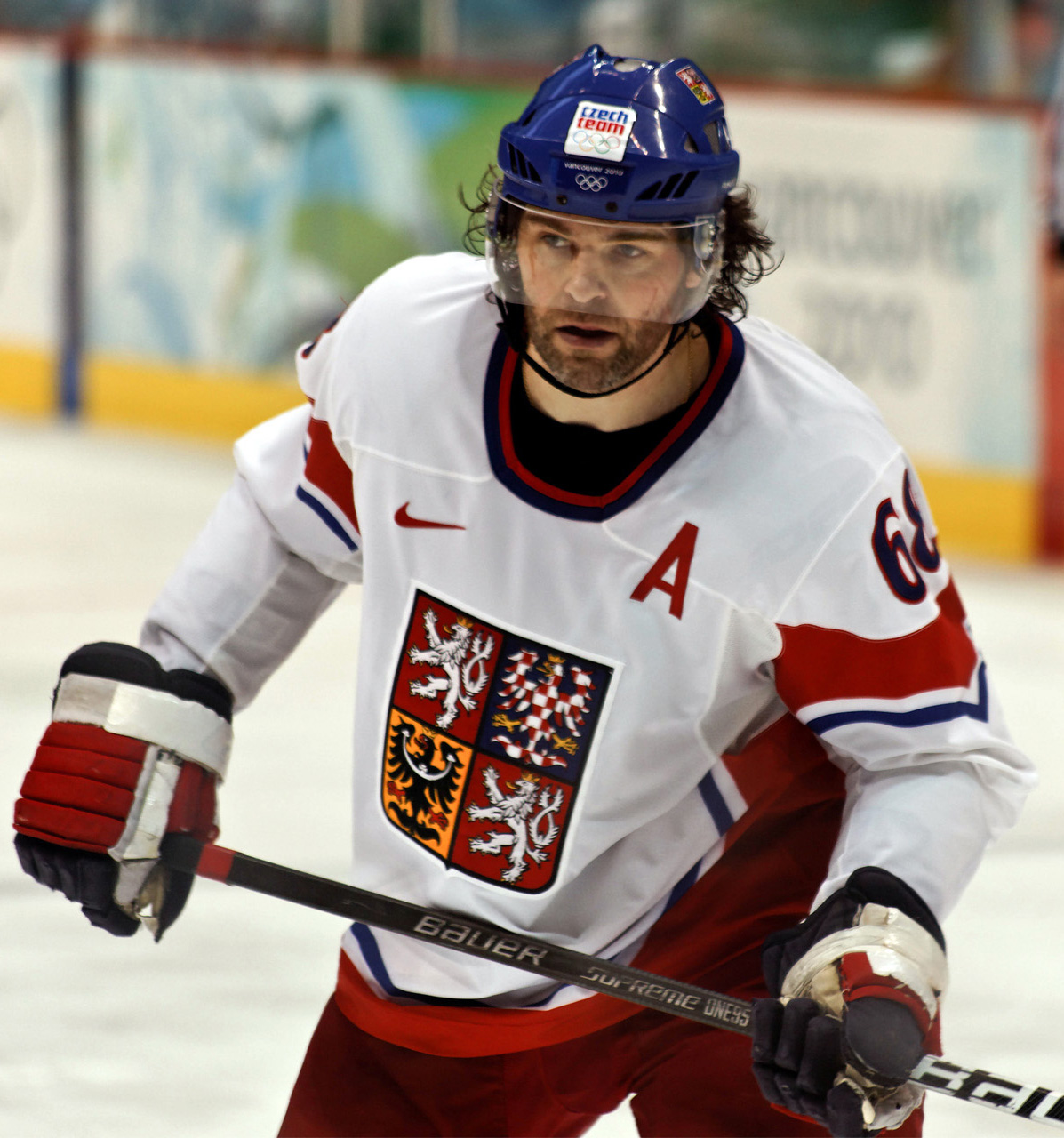
Jaromir Jagr, five-time winner

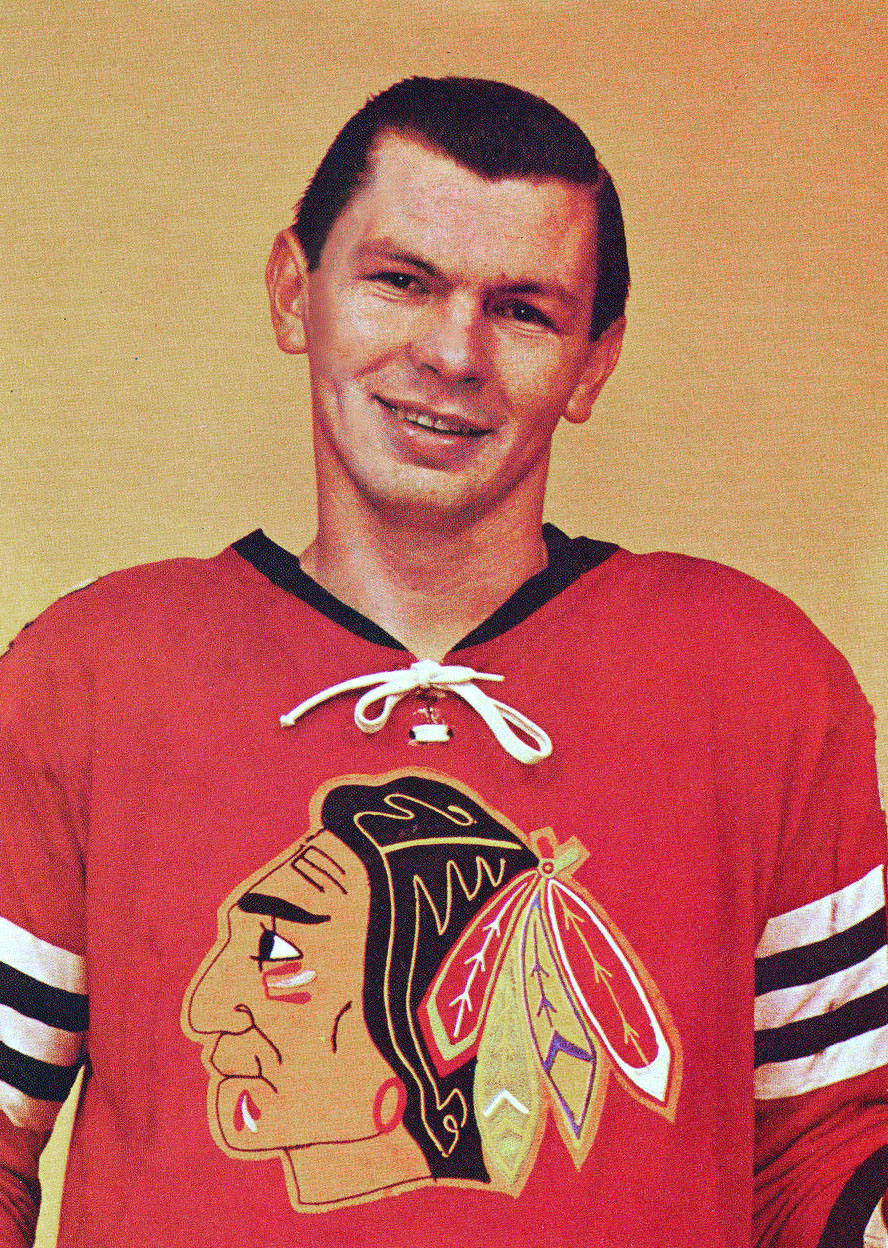
Stan Mikita, four-time winner

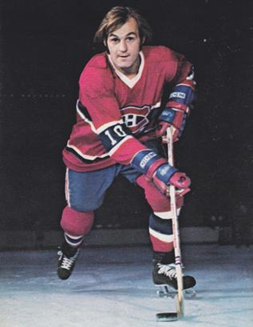
Guy Lafleur, three-time winner

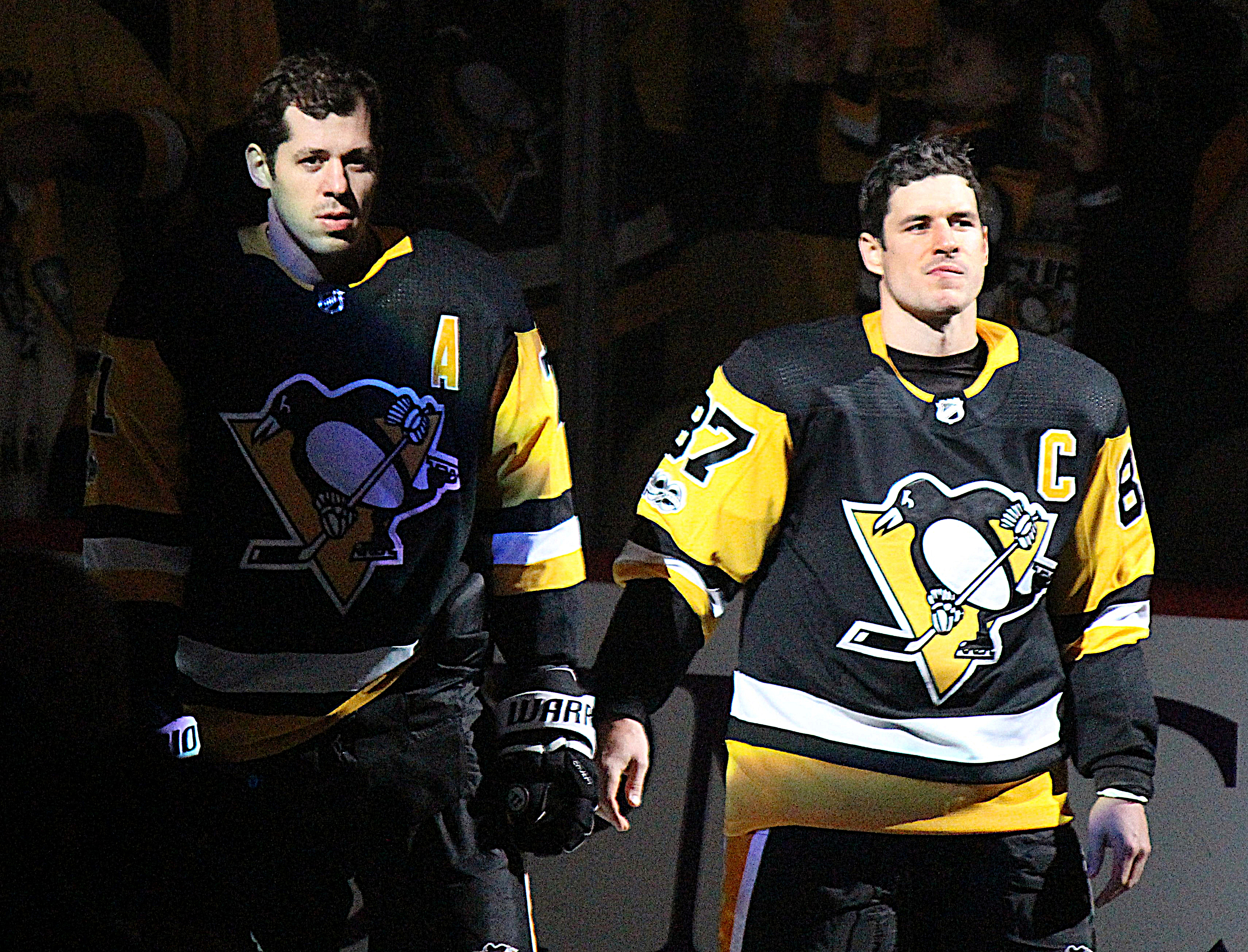
Evgeni Malkin (left) and Sidney Crosby (right), both two-time winners

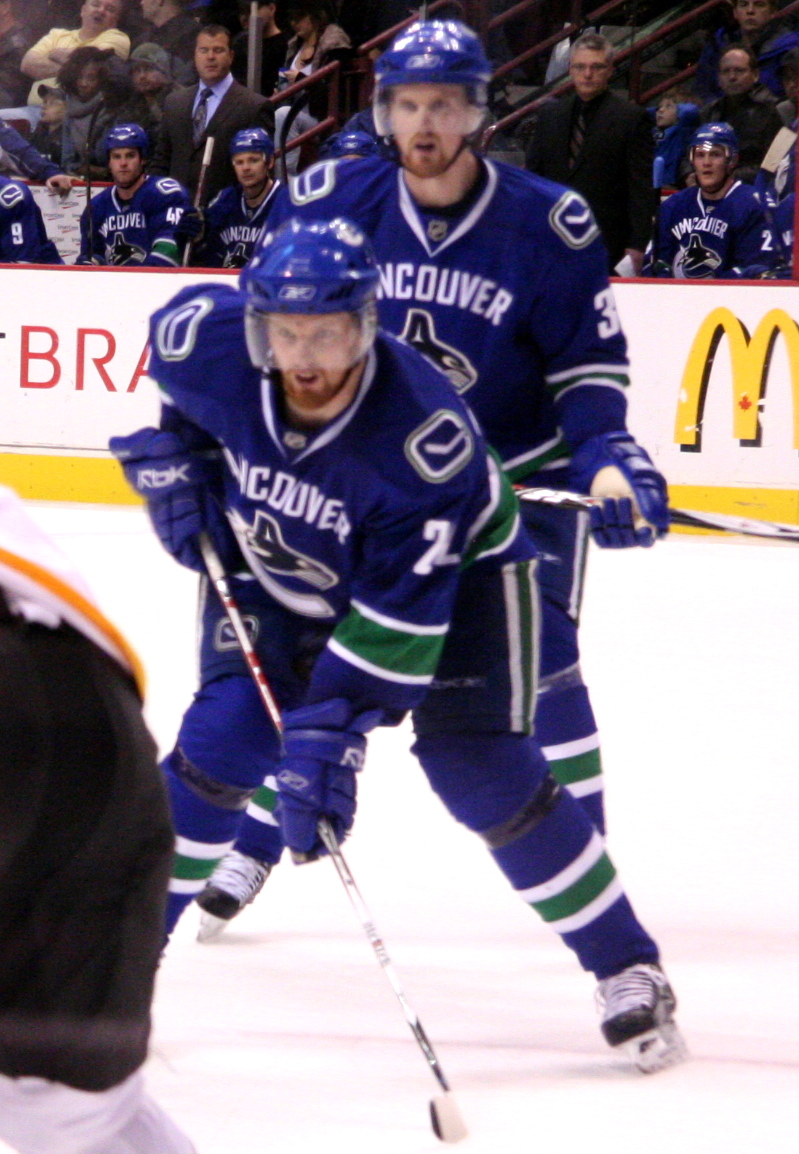
Henrik Sedin (top) and Daniel Sedin (bottom), back-to-back winners

^ Player is still active
† Player's team won the Stanley Cup
* Player elected to the Hockey Hall of Fame
~ Inactive player not yet eligible for the Hockey Hall of Fame

Bold Player with the most points ever scored in a season.

Art Ross Trophy winners
Season	Winner	Team	Points	Win #
1947–48	Elmer Lach*	Montreal Canadiens	61	1 (2) (Note: Lach won a scoring title prior to the inception of the trophy, making this his second scoring title but only his first Art Ross Trophy win)
1948–49	Roy Conacher*	Chicago Black Hawks	68	1
1949–50	Ted Lindsay*	Detroit Red Wings†	78	1
1950–51	Gordie Howe*	Detroit Red Wings	86	1
1951–52	Gordie Howe*	Detroit Red Wings†	86	2
1952–53	Gordie Howe*	Detroit Red Wings	95	3
1953–54	Gordie Howe*	Detroit Red Wings†	81	4
1954–55	Bernie Geoffrion*	Montreal Canadiens	75	1
1955–56	Jean Beliveau*	Montreal Canadiens†	88	1
1956–57	Gordie Howe*	Detroit Red Wings	89	5
1957–58	Dickie Moore*	Montreal Canadiens†	84	1
1958–59	Dickie Moore*	Montreal Canadiens†	96	2
1959–60	Bobby Hull*	Chicago Black Hawks	81	1
1960–61	Bernie Geoffrion*	Montreal Canadiens	95	2
1961–62	Bobby Hull*	Chicago Black Hawks	84	2
1962–63	Gordie Howe*	Detroit Red Wings	86	6
1963–64	Stan Mikita*	Chicago Black Hawks	89	1
1964–65	Stan Mikita*	Chicago Black Hawks	87	2
1965–66	Bobby Hull*	Chicago Black Hawks	97	3
1966–67	Stan Mikita*	Chicago Black Hawks	97	3
1967–68	Stan Mikita*	Chicago Black Hawks	87	4
1968–69	Phil Esposito*	Boston Bruins	126	1
1969–70	Bobby Orr*	Boston Bruins†	120	1
1970–71	Phil Esposito*	Boston Bruins	152	2
1971–72	Phil Esposito*	Boston Bruins†	133	3
1972–73	Phil Esposito*	Boston Bruins	130	4
1973–74	Phil Esposito*	Boston Bruins	145	5
1974–75	Bobby Orr*	Boston Bruins	135	2
1975–76	Guy Lafleur*	Montreal Canadiens†	125	1
1976–77	Guy Lafleur*	Montreal Canadiens†	136	2
1977–78	Guy Lafleur*	Montreal Canadiens†	132	3
1978–79	Bryan Trottier*	New York Islanders	134	1
1979–80	Marcel Dionne*	Los Angeles Kings	137	1
1980–81	Wayne Gretzky*	Edmonton Oilers	164	1
1981–82	Wayne Gretzky*	Edmonton Oilers	212	2
1982–83	Wayne Gretzky*	Edmonton Oilers	196	3
1983–84	Wayne Gretzky*	Edmonton Oilers†	205	4
1984–85	Wayne Gretzky*	Edmonton Oilers†	208	5
1985–86	Wayne Gretzky*	Edmonton Oilers	215	6
1986–87	Wayne Gretzky*	Edmonton Oilers†	183	7
1987–88	Mario Lemieux*	Pittsburgh Penguins	168	1
1988–89	Mario Lemieux*	Pittsburgh Penguins	199	2
1989–90	Wayne Gretzky*	Los Angeles Kings	142	8
1990–91	Wayne Gretzky*	Los Angeles Kings	163	9
1991–92	Mario Lemieux*	Pittsburgh Penguins†	131	3
1992–93	Mario Lemieux*	Pittsburgh Penguins	160	4
1993–94	Wayne Gretzky*	Los Angeles Kings	130	10
1994–95 (Note: Season shortened by the 1994–95 NHL lockout)	Jaromir Jagr~	Pittsburgh Penguins	70	1
1995–96	Mario Lemieux*	Pittsburgh Penguins	161	5
1996–97	Mario Lemieux*	Pittsburgh Penguins	122	6
1997–98	Jaromir Jagr~	Pittsburgh Penguins	102	2
1998–99	Jaromir Jagr~	Pittsburgh Penguins	127	3
1999–2000	Jaromir Jagr~	Pittsburgh Penguins	96	4
2000–01	Jaromir Jagr~	Pittsburgh Penguins	121	5
2001–02	Jarome Iginla*	Calgary Flames	96	1
2002–03	Peter Forsberg*	Colorado Avalanche	106	1
2003–04	Martin St. Louis*	Tampa Bay Lightning†	94	1
2004–05 (Note: Season canceled due to league lockout)	—	—	—	—
2005–06	Joe Thornton*	Boston Bruins/San Jose Sharks	125	1
2006–07	Sidney Crosby^	Pittsburgh Penguins	120	1
2007–08	Alexander Ovechkin^	Washington Capitals	112	1
2008–09	Evgeni Malkin^	Pittsburgh Penguins†	113	1
2009–10	Henrik Sedin*	Vancouver Canucks	112	1
2010–11	Daniel Sedin*	Vancouver Canucks	104	1
2011–12	Evgeni Malkin^	Pittsburgh Penguins	109	2
2012–13 (Note: Season shortened by the 2012–13 NHL lockout)	Martin St. Louis*	Tampa Bay Lightning	60	2
2013–14	Sidney Crosby^	Pittsburgh Penguins	104	2
2014–15	Jamie Benn^	Dallas Stars	87	1
2015–16	Patrick Kane^	Chicago Blackhawks	106	1
2016–17	Connor McDavid^	Edmonton Oilers	100	1
2017–18	Connor McDavid^	Edmonton Oilers	108	2
2018–19	Nikita Kucherov^	Tampa Bay Lightning	128	1
2019–20	Leon Draisaitl^	Edmonton Oilers	110	1
2020–21	Connor McDavid^	Edmonton Oilers	105	3
2021–22	Connor McDavid^	Edmonton Oilers	123	4
2022–23	Connor McDavid^	Edmonton Oilers	153	5
2023–24	Nikita Kucherov^	Tampa Bay Lightning	144	2
2024–25	Nikita Kucherov^	Tampa Bay Lightning	121	3
2025–26	Connor McDavid^	Edmonton Oilers	138	6

== See also ==
- List of National Hockey League awards
- List of NHL players
- List of NHL statistical leaders
