= Nestor Nyzhankivsky =

Ukrainian composer, pianist and music critic (1893–1940)

- Нестор Нижанківський
- Born: August 31, 1893; Berezhany, Ukraine
- Died: April 10, 1940 (aged 46); Łódź, Poland
- Resting place: Stryi city cemetery
- Education: Higher Music Institute, Lviv (under Mykola Lysenko); University of Vienna (1923); Prague State Conservatory (1927) in the master class of Vítězslav Novák

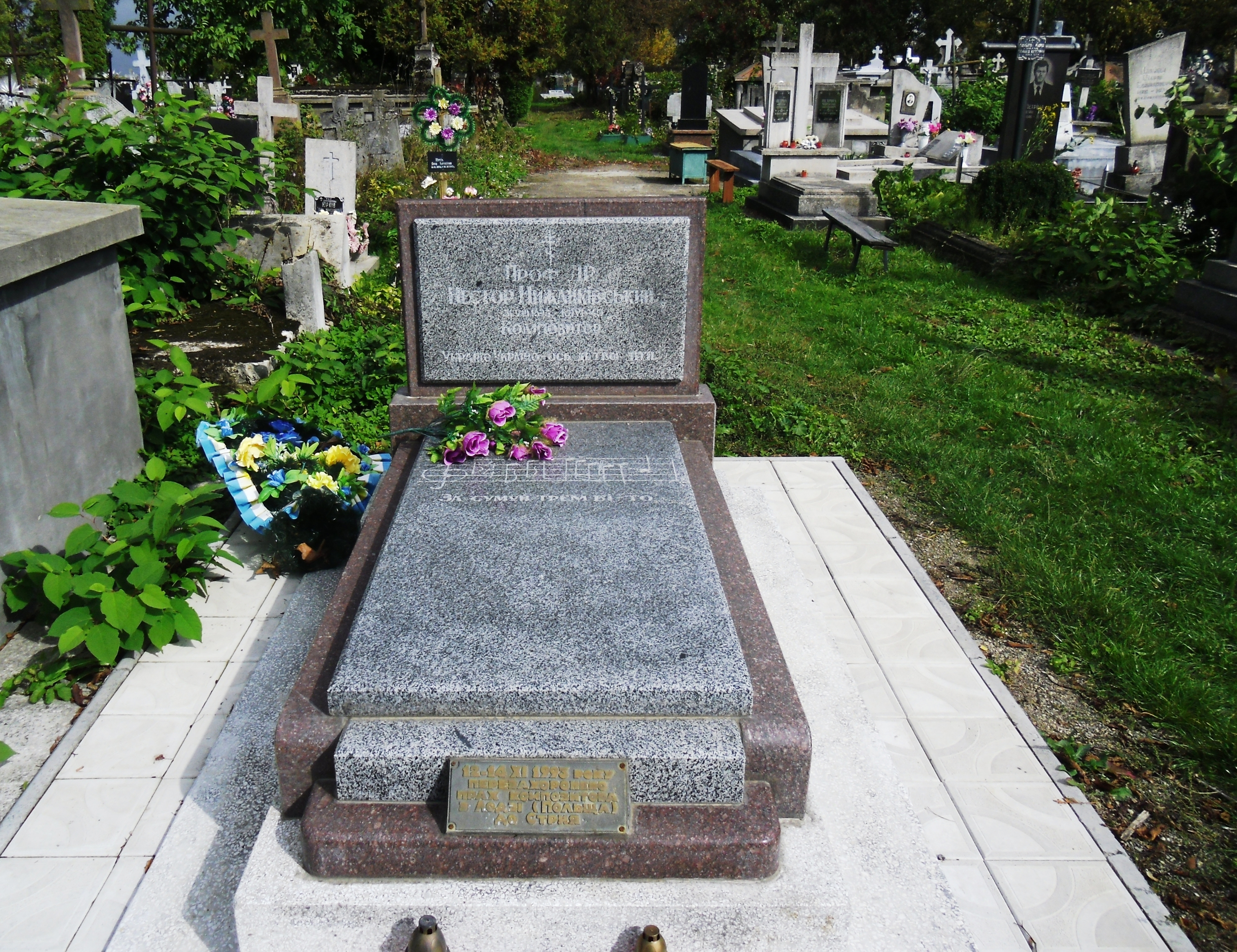
Tomb of Nyzhankivsky in Stryi

Nestor Nyzhankivsky (Nestor Ostapovych Nyzhankivsky) (Ukrainian: Не́стор Оста́пович Нижанкі́вський); August 31, 1893 – April 10, 1940) was a Ukrainian composer, pianist and music critic. Received his doctoral degree in history from the University of Vienna and graduated from the Prague State Conservatory.

== Live ==
Nestor Nyzhankivsky was born August 31, 1893, in Berezhany in the family of the composer, conductor, a Greek Catholic priest Ostap Nyzhankivsky. Nyzhankivsky family moved to Stryi in 1900, where Nestor finished school and gymnasium. Then he studied at the Higher Music Institute Mykola Lysenko Lviv.

During the First World War Nyzhankivsky was drafted into the army, then taken prisoner, where he returned in 1918. He received a PhD in history from Vienna University (1923) and graduated from the Prague State Conservatory (1927) in the master class of Vítězslav Novák.

He returned to Galicia to teach piano and theory at the Lysenko Higher Institute of Music in Lviv (1931–39) and became one of the founders (and first chairman) of the Union of Ukrainian Professional Musicians (SUPROM).

He died in exile April 10, 1940, in Łódź. The remains of Nestor Nyzhankivsky were reburied in cemetery of the city Stryi November 1993, near the tomb of his parents.

== Composer and musical activities ==
Nestor Nyzhankivsky composer left a great artistic heritage. His compositions for fortepiano include: "Prelude and Fugue on a Ukrainian Theme in C Minor", "Piano Trio in E Minor", "Little Suite", "Intermezzo in D Minor", and the "Great Variations" (also known as "Variations on a Ukrainian Theme in F Sharp Minor".) Art songs for voice and piano: "Ty liubchyku za horoliu" (My Beloved beyond the Mountain, text by U. Kravchenko), "Zasumui trembito" (Trembita's Dirge, text by R. Kupchynsky), "Naimyt" (The Hireling, text by I. Franko) and so on.
