= Stan Mikita =

Slovak-Canadian ice hockey player (1940–2018)

- Hockey Hall of Fame, 1983
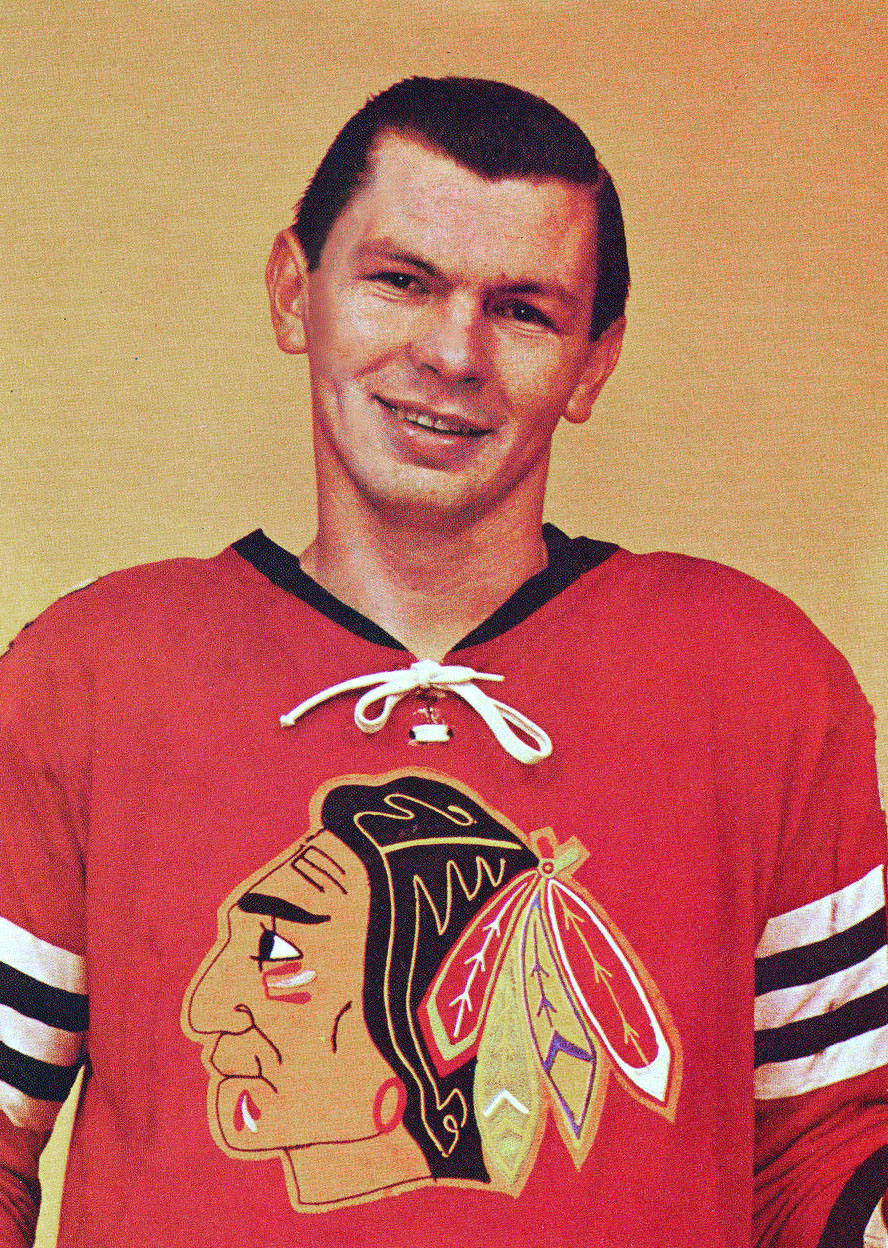
- Mikita with the Chicago Black Hawks, c. 1963
- Born: May 20, 1940 Sokolče, Slovak Republic
- Died: August 7, 2018 (aged 78) Chicago, Illinois, U.S.
- Height: 5 ft 9 in (175 cm)
- Weight: 169 lb (77 kg; 12 st 1 lb)
- Position: Centre
- Shot: Right
- Played for: Chicago Black Hawks
- National team: Canada
- Playing career: 1958–1980

Stanley Mikita (born Stanislav Guoth; May 20, 1940 – August 7, 2018) was a Slovak-born Canadian ice hockey player who played his entire 22-year National Hockey League (NHL) career with the Chicago Black Hawks.

Born in the Slovak Republic, Mikita was adopted and moved to Canada at the age of eight. After a few stellar seasons in the OHA, he was promoted to the Black Hawks in 1959. In the 1961 Stanley Cup playoffs, Mikita led the league in goals with six as the Black Hawks won the Stanley Cup, which made him the first Slovak-born player to win the Cup. The following season saw him named to his first All-Star Team on his first of fourteen consecutive 20-goal seasons. He won the first of four Art Ross Trophies as the leading point scorer in the 1963–64 season, which saw him record the most points four times in a span of five seasons. He won the Lady Byng Memorial Trophy, Hart Memorial Trophy, and the Ross Trophy in the 1966–67 and 1967–68 seasons, the first and so far only time a player has won each award in the same season. In 1972, he was the sixth person to record 1,000 points and in 1977, he became the eighth player to score 500 goals in NHL history.

Generally regarded as the best centre of the 1960s, Mikita recorded over 500 goals and 900 assists in nearly 1,400 games. When he retired, he was one of only two players to record 500 goals and 900 assists for a career and he had recorded the most points for a player to have played with only one franchise. Mikita was inducted into the Hockey Hall of Fame in 1983 along with the Slovak Hockey Hall of Fame in 2002. He had his jersey retired by the Black Hawks in 1980, the first player to receive the honor in franchise history. In 2017, he was named one of the 100 Greatest NHL Players.

== Early life ==
Mikita was born as Stanislav Guoth in Sokolče, Slovak Republic, during the brief period it was in existence as a client state of Nazi Germany. He was raised in a small farming community until 1948, when he moved to St. Catharines, Ontario. He was adopted by his aunt and uncle, Anna and Joe Mikita, who had emigrated from Slovakia to Canada 20 years earlier and were childless. They came to Czechoslovakia to visit the Guoth family before Christmas in 1948 and took the 8-year-old Stan with them when they went back to Canada. His parents believed that there was a brighter future for him in Canada than in then Communist Czechoslovakia, whose borders (including the area of Slovakia) had been reinstated at the end of World War II. His aunt and uncle also gave him their surname, and he anglicized his first name to Stanley. He attended high school at St. Catharines Collegiate.

== Playing career ==
After three starring junior seasons with the St. Catharines Teepees of the Ontario Hockey Association, Mikita was promoted to the parent Chicago Black Hawks in 1959–60. In his second full year, in 1961, the Black Hawks won their third Stanley Cup. The young centre led the entire league in goals during the playoffs, scoring a total of six.

The following season was his breakout year. Mikita became a star as centre of the famed "Scooter Line", with right wing Ken Wharram and left wingers Ab McDonald and Doug Mohns. Combining skilled defense and a reputation as one of the game's best faceoff men using his innovative curved stick, Mikita led the league in scoring four times in the decade, tying Bobby Hull's year-old single-season scoring mark in 1966–67 with 97 points (a mark broken two years later by former teammate Phil Esposito and currently held by Wayne Gretzky). The 1967–68 season, an 87-point effort from Mikita, was the last year a Chicago player won the scoring title until Patrick Kane's 106-point 2015–16 season.

In his early years, Mikita was among the most penalized players in the league, but he then decided to play a cleaner game and went on to win the Lady Byng Memorial Trophy for particularly sportsmanlike conduct combined with excellence twice. Mikita's drastic change in behavior came after he returned home from a road trip. His wife told him that while their daughter, Meg, was watching the Black Hawks' last road game on television, she turned and said, "Mommy, why does Daddy spend so much time sitting down?" The camera had just shown Mikita in the penalty box again.

During his playing career, in 1973, Mikita teamed up with Chicago businessman Irv Tiahnybik to form the American Hearing Impaired Hockey Association (AHIHA), to bring together deaf and hard-of-hearing hockey players from all over the country, and he founded the Stan Mikita School for the Hearing Impaired, inspired by a friend's deaf son who was an aspiring goalie. He also helped bring the Special Olympics to Chicago, bringing his family out to volunteer at races.

Internationally, Mikita played two games of the Summit Series in 1972 for Canada against Soviet Union, both of them in Canada, as well as two exhibition games also during the Summit Series, one against Sweden in Stockholm and one against Czechoslovakia in Prague. He also played several exhibition games for Czechoslovakia in summer 1967 when he came to his country of origin to visit his family.

=== Curved stick use ===
Mikita and teammate Bobby Hull were a well-known forward duo in the 1960s, gaining notoriety for using sticks with curved blades. Such sticks gave a comparative advantage to shooters versus goaltenders. As a result, the NHL limited blade curvature to ½" in 1970. Mikita reportedly began the practice after his standard stick got caught in a bench door, bending the blade before he hit the ice; he soon was borrowing a propane torch from team trainers to create a deliberate curve.

Mikita was also one of the first players to wear a helmet full-time, after a December 1967 game in which an errant shot tore a piece off one of his ears (it was stitched back on).

== Retirement ==
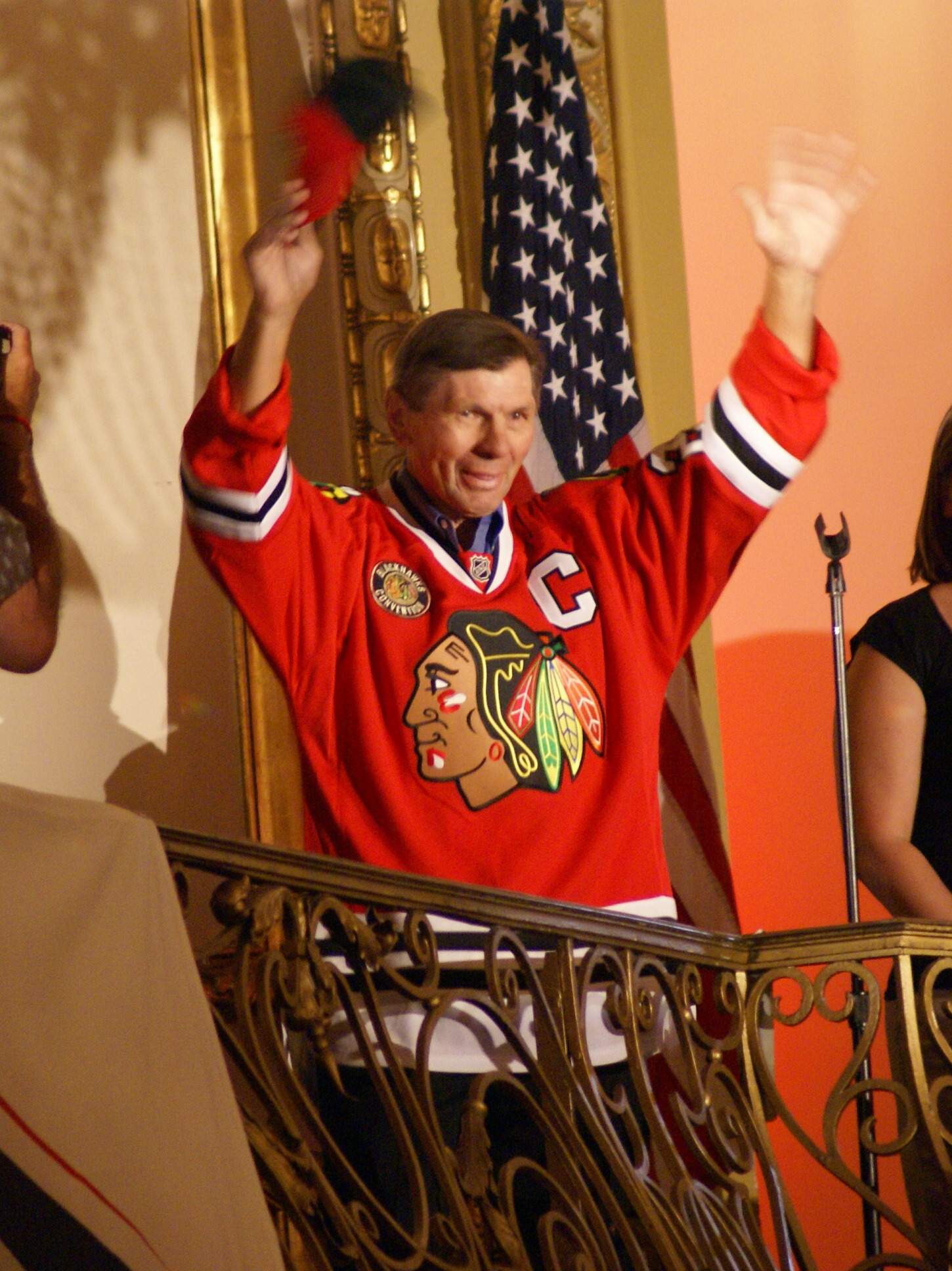
Mikita in 2009

Mikita's later years were marred by chronic back injuries, leading to his retirement as an active player on April 14, 1980. At that time, only Gordie Howe and Phil Esposito had scored more points in the NHL, and just six players had appeared in more games. Mikita was inducted into the Hockey Hall of Fame in 1983, and into the Slovak Hockey Hall of Fame in 2002.

After retiring, Mikita became a golf pro at Kemper Lakes Golf Club. His other business interests, under Stan Mikita Enterprises, included making the small plastic sauce containers that accompany chicken nuggets at McDonald's. He owned Stan Mikita's Village Inn in the 1960s and 1970s, located in the Oakbrook Shopping Center, Oak Brook, Illinois.

Mikita provided the foreword to the children's book My Man Stan by Tim Wendel. Mikita is featured as a main character in the book.

He became a goodwill ambassador for the Blackhawks' organization, and in fall of 2011, the Blackhawks raised a statue honouring Mikita at Gate 3½ at Chicago's United Center. For three decades the Blackhawks Alumni Association has hosted an annual golf tournament named in Mikita's honour.

As of January 2022, Mikita ranks 15th in regular-season points scored in the history of the NHL, and just three other players (Steve Yzerman, Alex Delvecchio, and Nicklas Lidström) have appeared in more games while playing for only one team over their careers.

Mikita appeared as himself in a cameo role in the 1992 film Wayne's World, which featured a "Stan Mikita" doughnut shop, spoofing the Canadian doughnut chain Tim Hortons (co-founded by Hockey Hall of Fame member Tim Horton). A restaurant named "Stan Mikita's" and closely resembling the movie's version opened in 1994 at the Virginia amusement park Kings Dominion and at Paramount Carowinds in Charlotte.

== Illness and death ==
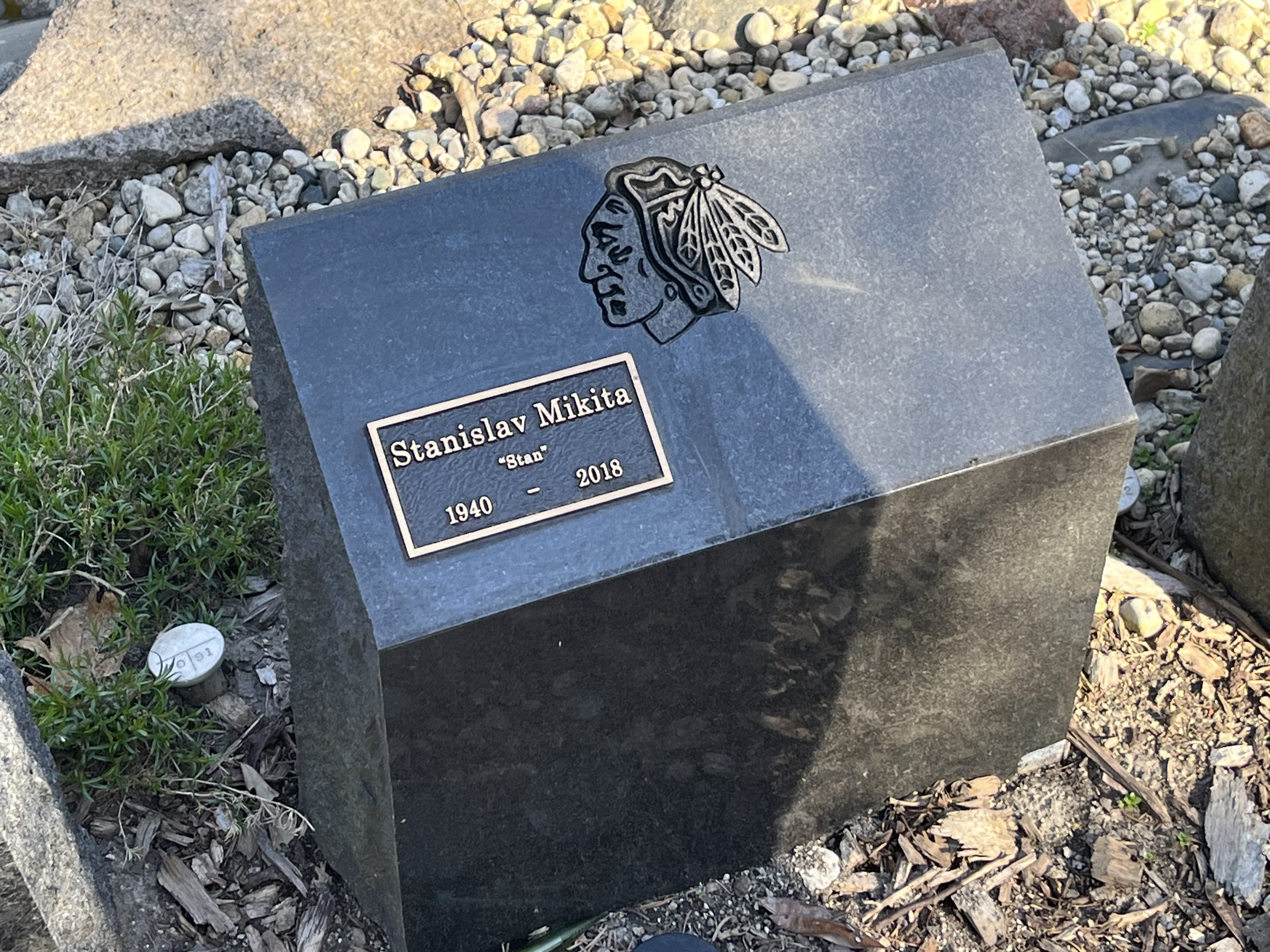
Mikita's gravestone

On May 24, 2011, Mikita was diagnosed with oral cancer and began external beam radiation therapy. On January 30, 2015, the Chicago Tribune released this statement from his wife: "Stan has been diagnosed with suspected Lewy body dementia, a progressive disease, and was under the care of compassionate and understanding care givers". By June, it had been reported that Mikita had no memory of his former life and was being cared for by his wife Jill.

Mikita died at the age of 78 on August 7, 2018. He was survived by his wife, four children and nine grandchildren. Mikita's ashes are interred at Bronswood Cemetery in Oak Brook, Illinois. On September 14, 2019, it was reported by the Boston University CTE Center, that upon performing a posthumous study of Mikita's brain, it was found that he suffered from stage 3 chronic traumatic encephalopathy, or CTE, at the time of his death. This marked Mikita as the first Hall of Famer to ever have been diagnosed with the disease.

== Career statistics ==
=== Regular season and playoffs ===
			Regular season					Playoffs
Season	Team	League	GP	G	A	Pts	PIM	GP	G	A	Pts	PIM
1956–57	St. Catharines Teepees	OHA	52	16	31	47	129	14	8	9	17	44
1957–58	St. Catharines Teepees	OHA	52	31	47	78	146	8	4	5	9	46
1958–59	St. Catharines Teepees	OHA	45	38	59	97	197	—	—	—	—	—
1958–59	Chicago Black Hawks	NHL	3	0	1	1	4	—	—	—	—	—
1959–60	Chicago Black Hawks	NHL	67	8	18	26	119	3	0	1	1	2
1960–61	Chicago Black Hawks	NHL	66	19	34	53	100	12	6	5	11	21
1961–62	Chicago Black Hawks	NHL	70	25	52	77	97	12	6	15	21	19
1962–63	Chicago Black Hawks	NHL	65	31	45	76	69	6	3	2	5	2
1963–64	Chicago Black Hawks	NHL	70	39	50	89	146	7	3	6	9	8
1964–65	Chicago Black Hawks	NHL	70	28	59	87	154	14	3	7	10	53
1965–66	Chicago Black Hawks	NHL	68	30	48	78	58	6	1	2	3	2
1966–67	Chicago Black Hawks	NHL	70	35	62	97	12	6	2	2	4	2
1967–68	Chicago Black Hawks	NHL	72	40	47	87	14	11	5	7	12	6
1968–69	Chicago Black Hawks	NHL	74	30	67	97	52	—	—	—	—	—
1969–70	Chicago Black Hawks	NHL	76	39	47	86	50	8	4	6	10	2
1970–71	Chicago Black Hawks	NHL	74	24	48	72	85	18	5	13	18	16
1971–72	Chicago Black Hawks	NHL	74	26	39	65	46	8	3	1	4	4
1972–73	Chicago Black Hawks	NHL	57	27	56	83	32	15	7	13	20	8
1973–74	Chicago Black Hawks	NHL	76	30	50	80	46	11	5	6	11	8
1974–75	Chicago Black Hawks	NHL	79	36	50	86	48	8	3	4	7	12
1975–76	Chicago Black Hawks	NHL	48	16	41	57	37	4	0	0	0	4
1976–77	Chicago Black Hawks	NHL	57	19	30	49	20	2	0	1	1	0
1977–78	Chicago Black Hawks	NHL	76	18	41	59	35	4	3	0	3	0
1978–79	Chicago Black Hawks	NHL	65	19	36	55	34	—	—	—	—	—
1979–80	Chicago Black Hawks	NHL	17	2	5	7	12	—	—	—	—	—
NHL totals			1,394	541	926	1,467	1,270	155	59	91	150	169

Statistics via HockeyDB

=== International ===
Year	Team	Event	GP	G	A	Pts	PIM
1972	Canada	SS	2	0	1	1	0
Senior totals			2	0	1	1	0

== Awards and accomplishments ==
- Ranked 14th all-time in points, 18th in assists, 31st in goals, and 40th in games played (at end of 2017-18 NHL season)
- Won the Hart Memorial Trophy as most valuable player in 1967 and 1968
- Won the Art Ross Trophy as leading scorer in 1964, 1965, 1967, and 1968
- Won the Lady Byng Memorial Trophy in 1967 and 1968
- Stanley Cup champion (1961)
- Named to the NHL's First All-Star Team in 1962, 1963, 1964, 1966, 1967, and 1968
- Named to the NHL's Second All-Star Team in 1965 and 1970.
- Played in NHL All-Star Game in 1964, 1967, 1968, 1969, 1971, 1972, 1973, 1974, and 1975
- Won the Lester Patrick Trophy in 1976
- The only player in NHL history to win the Hart, Art Ross, and Lady Byng trophies in the same season, doing so in consecutive seasons, in 1966–67 and 1967–68
- Was named to Team Canada for the 1972 Summit Series, but only played two games due to injuries
- In 1998, he was ranked number 17 on The Hockey News' list of the 100 greatest NHL players
- Mikita's number 21 was retired by the Blackhawks on October 19, 1980; he was the first player to have his jersey number retired by the Blackhawks
- Mikita was inducted into the Hockey Hall of Fame in 1983
- Mikita was inducted into the Slovak Hockey Hall of Fame in 2002
- The ice rink in Ružomberok, Slovakia, is named after him
- In 2011, statues of Mikita and Bobby Hull were installed outside the United Center, where the Blackhawks currently play
- The first player of Slovak origin who won the Stanley Cup

== See also ==
- List of NHL statistical leaders
- List of NHL players with 1,000 points
- List of NHL players with 500 goals
- List of NHL players with 1,000 games played

Sporting positions
Preceded by Pit Martin	Chicago Black Hawks captain 1976–77 with Pit Martin	Succeeded by Keith Magnuson
Awards and achievements
Preceded by Bobby Hull	Winner of the Hart Memorial Trophy; 1967, 1968	Succeeded by Phil Esposito
Preceded by Gordie Howe; Bobby Hull	Winner of the Art Ross Trophy; 1964, 1965; 1967, 1968	Succeeded by Bobby Hull; Phil Esposito
Preceded by Alex Delvecchio	Winner of the Lady Byng Trophy; 1967, 1968	Succeeded by Alex Delvecchio
