= American Hearing Impaired Hockey Association =

Disability organization based in the United States

The American Hearing Impaired Hockey Association (AHIHA) was established in 1973 by Chicago Blackhawks player Stan Mikita, and a local businessman by the name of Irv Tiahnybik, after Irv discovered the difficulties his hard-of-hearing son was having with his hearing teammates. The hockey camp grew quickly, and drew deaf and hard-of-hearing ice hockey players from all over the country.

The organization hosts the annual, week-long Stan Mikita Hockey Camp in Woodridge, Illinois, at the Seven Bridges Ice Arena. The camp itself is free, though players do have to supply their own equipment and pay for their hotel room.

In addition to sponsoring the camp, AHIHA also helps advocate for its players, provides scholarships, and helps children obtain hearing aids. The Deaflympics ice hockey team is typically comprised almost solely of AHIHA players, and represented the USA once again in 2007 at Salt Lake City.
