= Sokolče =

Coordinates: 49°5′43″N 19°29′28″E

Sokolče is a former village which was situated in the Liptov region of Slovakia. The village was inundated by the reservoir Liptovská Mara in 1975.

== Famous residents ==
- Stan Mikita - NHL star, member of Hockey Hall of Fame
- Ján Starší (1933–2019), Slovak ice-hockey player, member of IIHF Hall of Fame
