= HMS Dunoon =

Minesweeper of the Royal Navy

Coordinates: 52°45′N 2°23′E

History

United Kingdom
- Builder: Clyde Shipbuilding Co
- Launched: 21 March 1919
- Identification: Pennant number: J52
- Fate: Sunk 30 April 1940 by a mine in the North Sea

General characteristics
- Class & type: Hunt-class minesweeper, Aberdare sub-class
- Displacement: 800 long tons (813 t)
- Length: 213 ft (65 m) o/a
- Beam: 28 ft 6 in (8.69 m)
- Draught: 7 ft 6 in (2.29 m)
- Installed power: 2 × Yarrow boilers; 2,200 ihp (1,600 kW)
- Propulsion: 2 shafts; 2 vertical triple-expansion steam engines
- Speed: 16 knots (30 km/h; 18 mph)
- Range: 1,500 nmi (2,800 km; 1,700 mi) at 15 knots (28 km/h; 17 mph)
- Complement: 74
- Armament: 1 × QF 4-inch (102 mm) gun; 1 × 76 mm (3.0 in) anti-aircraft gun

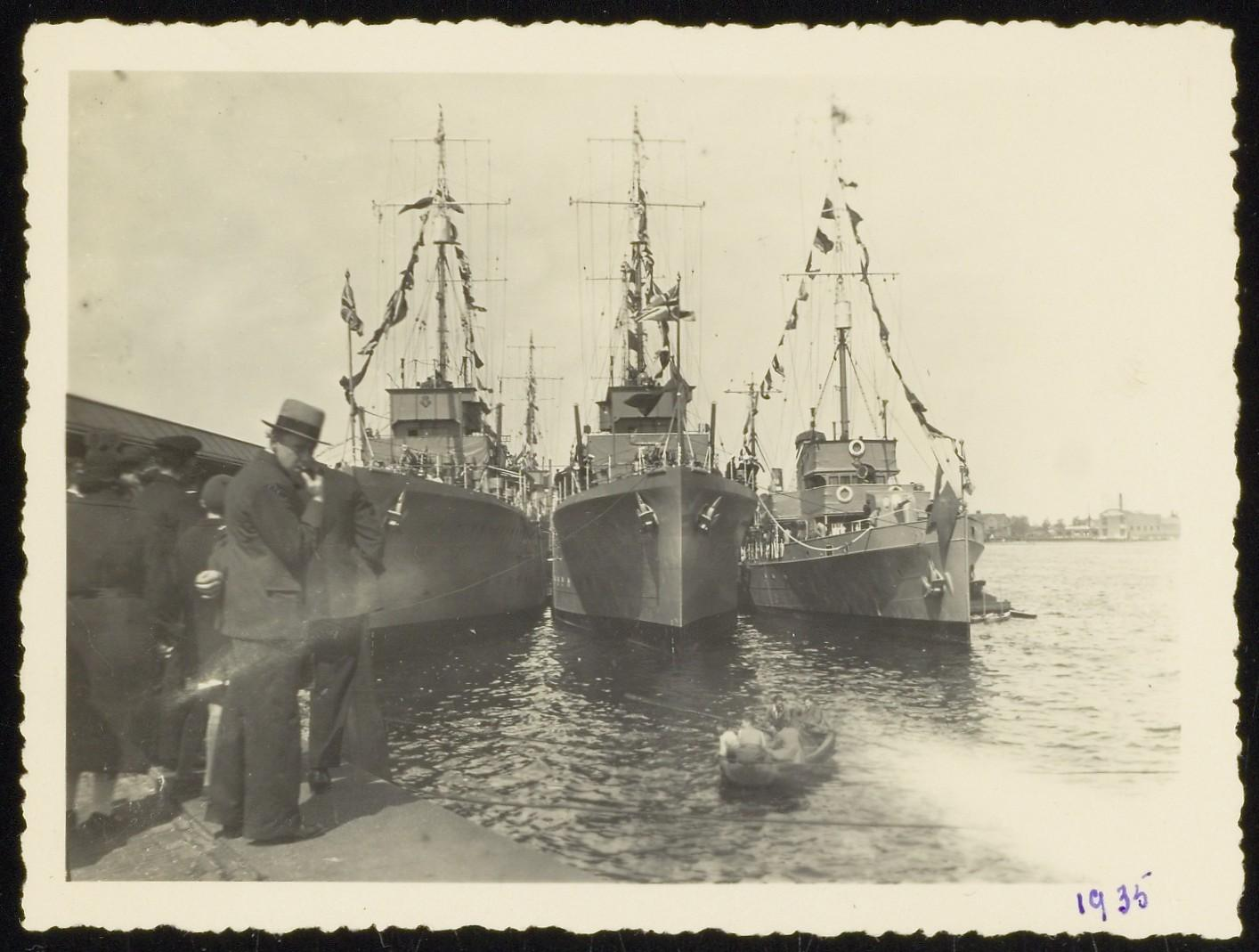
British minesweepers Harrier, Dunoon, and Hussar in Holland, 1935

HMS Dunoon was a Hunt-class minesweeper of the Aberdare sub-class built for the Royal Navy during World War I. She was not finished in time to participate in the First World War and was sunk by a mine in 1940.

== Design and description ==
The Aberdare sub-class were enlarged versions of the original Hunt-class ships with a more powerful armament. The ships displaced 800 long tons (810 t) at normal load. They had a length between perpendiculars of 220 feet (67.1 m) and measured 231 feet (70.4 m) long overall. The Aberdares had a beam of 26 feet 6 inches (8.1 m) and a draught of 7 feet 6 inches (2.3 m). The ships' complement consisted of 74 officers and ratings.

The ships had two vertical triple-expansion steam engines, each driving one shaft, using steam provided by two Yarrow boilers. The engines produced a total of 2,200 indicated horsepower (1,600 kW) and gave a maximum speed of 16 knots (30 km/h; 18 mph). They carried a maximum of 185 long tons (188 t) of coal which gave them a range of 1,500 nautical miles (2,800 km; 1,700 mi) at 15 knots (28 km/h; 17 mph).

The Aberdare sub-class was armed with a quick-firing (QF) four-inch (102 mm) gun forward of the bridge and a QF twelve-pounder (76.2 mm) anti-aircraft gun aft. Some ships were fitted with six- or three-pounder guns in lieu of the twelve-pounder.

== Construction and career ==
HMS Dunoon was built by the Clyde Shipbuilding Company. In November 1939 she was sweeping for mines around Malta. The following month she was recalled to England, stopping at Gibraltar for fuel. She then worked in the North Sea as part of the 4th Minesweeping Flotilla, based at Great Yarmouth. In April 1940 she struck a mine at Smith's Knoll near Great Yarmouth and sank with the loss of 3 officers and 23 ratings.

== Fiction ==
HMS Dunoon is featured in the 1958 book The Dragon Tree by Victor Canning

== See also ==
- Dunoon, Scotland
