= List of shipwrecks in April 1940 =

The list of shipwrecks in April 1940 includes ships sunk, foundered, grounded, or otherwise lost during April 1940.

== 2 April ==
List of shipwrecks: 2 April 1940
Ship	State	Description
Signe	Finland	World War II: Convoy HN 23A: The cargo ship straggled behind the convoy. She was torpedoed and sunk in the North Sea east of the Orkney Islands, United Kingdom by U-38 (Kriegsmarine) with the loss of all nineteen crew.

== 3 April ==
List of shipwrecks: 3 April 1940
Ship	State	Description
Gorspen	United Kingdom	World War II: The fishing trawler was bombed and sunk in the North Sea 20 nautical miles (37 km) east by south of Muckle Flugga, Shetland Islands by a Heinkel He 111 aircraft of Kampfgeschwader 26, Luftwaffe and was abandoned by her crew. They were rescued by the fising trawler Bracondene (United Kingdom).
Lone Eagle	United States	The fishing vessel was sunk off Point Arguello, California in a collision with USS Crosby (United States Navy). Her seven crew were rescued by USS Crosby.
Produce	Norway	The cargo ship ran aground in the Paracel Islands and was wrecked.
Sansonnet	United Kingdom	World War II: The fishing trawler was bombed and sunk in the North Sea 18 nautical miles (33 km) east by south of Muckle Flugga by a Luftwaffe aircraft. All ten crew were lost.

== 4 April ==
List of shipwrecks: 4 April 1940
Ship	State	Description
HMT Golden Dawn	Royal Navy	The drifter sank at Ardrossan, Ayrshire whilst on Admiralty service.

== 5 April ==
List of shipwrecks: 5 April 1940
Ship	State	Description
Bjørnhaug	Norway	The cargo ship ran aground at Fife Ness, Fife, United Kingdom and was wrecked. Her twelve crew survived.

== 6 April ==
List of shipwrecks: 6 April 1940
Ship	State	Description
Dunstan	United Kingdom	World War II: The cargo ship was bombed and sunk by aircraft in the Atlantic Ocean (59°09′N 8°22′W with the loss of two of her 48 crew.
Navarra	Norway	World War II: Convoy HN 10B: The cargo ship was torpedoed and sunk in the Atlantic Ocean west of the Orkney Islands, United Kingdom (approximately (59°N 4°W) by U-59 (Kriegsmarine) with the loss of twelve of the 26 people aboard. Survivors were rescued by Atlas (Finland).
U-1	Kriegsmarine	World War II: The Type IIA submarine struck a mine in the North Sea north of Terschelling, Friesland, Netherlands and sank with the loss of all 24 crew.
U-50	Kriegsmarine	World War II: The Type VIIB submarine struck a mine in the North Sea north of Terschelling and sank with the loss of all 44 crew.

== 7 April ==
List of shipwrecks: 7 April 1940
Ship	State	Description
Elling	Norway	The coaster sprang a leak and sank at Lindesnes, Norway. She was later raised, repaired and returned to service.

== 8 April ==
List of shipwrecks: 8 April 1940
Ship	State	Description
HMS Glowworm	Royal Navy	World War II: Operation Weserübung: The G-class destroyer was shelled and sunk in the Norwegian Sea north west of Trondheim, Norway while ramming the heavy cruiser Admiral Hipper (Kriegsmarine). One hundred and eighteen crew were killed or died of their wounds. Admiral Hipper rescued 40 survivors, but at least six of them died of wounds. One sailor of Admiral Hipper was lost in the collision.
Okeania	Greece	World War II: The cargo ship struck a mine and sank in the North Sea (51°16′48″N 2°03′12″E) with the loss of a crew member. Survivors were rescued by HMS Boadicea (Royal Navy) and Beverland (Netherlands).
Rio de Janeiro	Germany	World War II: Operation Weserübung: The troopship was torpedoed and sunk off Lillesand, Norway (58°07.8′N 8°29.4′E) by Orzeł (Polish Navy) with the loss of about 200 of the 380 people on board. Survivors were rescued by HNoMS Gyller and HNoMS Odin (both Royal Norwegian Navy) and various fishing boats.
Stedingen	Kriegsmarine	World War II: Operation Weserübung: The tanker was shelled, torpedoed and sunk on her maiden voyage off Stavern, Norway (58°54′N 10°21′E) by HMS Trident (Royal Navy). Her 56 crew members survived and landed in Norway, except the captain that was taken prisoner or war by HMS Trident. She was salvaged in June, repaired and returned to service.
Taifun	Germany	World War II: Operation Weserübung: The tug sank in the Great Belt, off Denmark (54°49′N 10°49′E) after a collision with Richard Ohlrogge (Germany). Survivors were rescued by the fishing vessel Hugin (Germany) and the torpedo boat HDMS Glenten (Royal Danish Navy). Taifun was raised on 4 June 1940 and resumed service.

== 9 April ==
List of shipwrecks: 9 April 1940
Ship	State	Description
HNoMS A-2	Royal Norwegian Navy	World War II: Operation Weserübung: The A-class submarine was attacked by R 22 and R 23 (both Kriegsmarine) in the Oslofjord off Tønsberg and was forced to surrender. Her crew were taken prisoner and the submarine, the oldest one to be engaged in battle in WWII, was left drifting. She was later towed to Teie but was beyond repair and was scrapped.
HNoMS Æger	Royal Norwegian Navy	Æger World War II: Operation Weserübung: The Sleipner-class destroyer was bombed and sunk off Stavanger by Luftwaffe aircraft. Seven of her 75 crew were killed and eleven were severely wounded, one dying the next day in hospital.
Amasis	Germany	World War II: Operation Weserübung: The cargo ship was torpedoed and sunk off Måseskär, Sweden (58°13′N 11°13′E) by HMS Sunfish (Royal Navy). All 51 crew were rescued.
Blücher	Kriegsmarine	World War II: Battle of Drøbak Sound: The Admiral Hipper-class cruiser was sunk in Oslofjord by Norwegian coastal artillery and shore-based torpedoes with the heavy loss of life among her crew and troops carried aboard, but figures differ greatly depending on sources, from 320 to 1,000 dead.
Bockenheim	Germany	World War II: Operation Weserübung: The cargo ship was scuttled off Narvik, Norway by her master who mistakenly believed that the German destroyers entering the port were British. He ran the ship aground, ordered the men off, and ignited the demolition charges. There were no casualties. She was broken up on site and remains are still visible today.
Dagny	Sweden	World War II: The fishing vessel struck a mine and sank north of Hanstholm, Denmark with the loss of six of her crew.
HNoMS Eidsvold	Royal Norwegian Navy	World War II: First battle of Narvik: The Eidsvold-class coastal defence ship was torpedoed off Narvik by Z21 Wilhelm Heidkamp (Kriegsmarine) and sunk with the loss of 177 of her 183 crew.
HMS Gurkha	Royal Navy	World War II: Operation Weserübung: The Tribal-class destroyer was bombed and sunk in the North Sea south east of Bergen, Norway by Heinkel He 111 aircraft of Kampfgeschwader 26 and Junkers Ju 88 aircraft of Kampfgeschwader 30, Luftwaffe with the loss of sixteen of her 219 crew.
Inez	Sweden	World War II: The fishing boat was sunk by a mine north west of Hanstholm, Denmark with the loss of all six crew.
Karlsruhe	Kriegsmarine	World War II: Operation Weserübung: The Königsberg-class cruiser was torpedoed in the Skagerrak near Kristiansand, Norway by HMS Truant (Royal Navy) and severely damaged. Karlsruhe was subsequently scuttled by Greif (Kriegsmarine).
Main	Kriegsmarine	World War II: Operation Weserübung: The supply ship was captured in the North Sea, off Haugesund, Norway by HNoMS Draug (Royal Norwegian Navy). Main was later bombed and severely damaged by Luftwaffe aircraft and was scuttled by HNoMS Draug.
HNoMS Norge	Royal Norwegian Navy	World War II: First battle of Narvik: The Eidsvold-class coastal defence ship was torpedoed and sunk off Narvik by Z11 Bernd von Arnim (Kriegsmarine) with the loss of 105 of her 195 crew.
Ölschiff 2	Kriegsmarine	World War II: Operation Weserübung: The naval tanker was scuttled in Glomfjord, Norway (58°26′N 17°25′E whilst under attack from HNoMS Nordkapp (Royal Norwegian Navy). Ölschiff 2 was refloated in July, repaired and returned to service.
R 17	Kriegsmarine	World War II: Operation Weserübung: The Type R 17 minesweeper was shelled and sunk off Horten, Norway by HNoMS Rauma and HNoMS Olav Tryggvason (both Royal Norwegian Navy).
Roda	Kriegsmarine	Roda World War II: Operation Weserübung: The supply ship was captured off Stavanger, Norway by HNoMS Æger (Royal Norwegian Navy). She was torpedoed and sunk by HNoMS Sleipner (Royal Norwegian Navy). Roda was refloated on 3 December 1953 and taken in tow for Hamburg, West Germany, but sank en-route.
Romanby	United Kingdom	World War II: Operation Weserübung: The cargo ship was scuttled at Narvik, Norway. Thirty of her crew were interned in Sweden.
São Pãulo	Kriegsmarine	World War II: Operation Weserübung: The supply ship struck a mine off Bergen (60°30′N 5°10′E) and sank. The mine had been laid by HNoMS Tyr or HNoMS Uller (both Royal Norwegian Navy)
Seattle	Germany	World War II: Operation Weserübung: The cargo liner was sunk off Kristiansand, Norway by Norwegian coastal artillery.
Sørland	Norway	World War II: Battle of Drøbak Sound: The cutter was shelled and set on fire in the Oslofjord by R 18 and R 19 (both Kriegsmarine) and was beached with the loss of two of her five crew. She was a total loss.
HNoMS Tor	Royal Norwegian Navy	World War II: Operation Weserübung: The Sleipner-class destroyer was scuttled off Fredrikstad, Norway to avoid capture by German forces. She was salvaged by the Germans, repaired and entered service as Tiger.

== 10 April ==
List of shipwrecks: 10 April 1940
Ship	State	Description
Aachen	Kriegsmarine	World War II: First Battle of Narvik: The transport ship was sunk in the Norwegian Sea off Narvik, Norway in a battle between British and German destroyers. She was refloated in 1951, repaired and entered British service as Oakhill.
Albatros	Kriegsmarine	World War II: Operation Weserübung: The Raubvogel-class torpedo boat ran aground in Oslofjord, Norway whilst engaged in a battle with Oslofjord Fortress and was wrecked.
Altona	Germany	World War II: First Battle of Narvik: The cargo ship was torpedoed and sunk in the Norwegian Sea off Narvik by HMS Hardy, HMS Havelock and HMS Hunter (all Royal Navy). Three crew members were killed.
Antares	Kriegsmarine	World War II: Operation Weserübung: The troopship was torpedoed and sunk in the Skaggerak off Lysekil, Sweden (58°11′N 11°17′E) by HMS Sunfish (Royal Navy). There were only 34 survivors of about 200 men aboard.
Z22 Anton Schmitt	Kriegsmarine	World War II: First Battle of Narvik: The Type 1936-class destroyer was torpedoed and sunk in the Norwegian Sea off Narvik by HMS Hunter (Royal Navy).
Ardrar	Kriegsmarine	World War II: Operation Weserübung: The cargo ship was torpedoed and sunk by HMS Triton (Royal Navy).
Blythmoor	United Kingdom	World War II: First Battle of Narvik: The cargo ship was sunk by Royal Navy torpedoes and being shelled by British and German destroyers off Narvik. Six of her 43 crew were killed. Thirty survivors were interned in Sweden. Blythmoor was refloated in 1953 and scrapped.
Boden	Sweden	World War II: First Battle of Narvik: The cargo ship was sunk by Royal Navy torpedoes and being shelled by British and German destroyers off Narvik. She was refloated in June 1953 and scrapped.
Curityba	Kriegsmarine	World War II: The transport ship was shelled and sunk in the Oslofjord by shore-based artillery. She was refloated on 4 June, repaired and returned to service.
Eldrid	Norway	World War II: The cargo ship was damaged by enemy action at [Narvik.
Friedenau	Kriegsmarine	World War II: Operation Weserübung: The troopship was torpedoed and sunk in the Skaggerak off the Pater Noster Lighthouse, Sweden (57°50′N 11°23′E) by HMS Triton (Royal Navy). Three hundred and eighty-four officers and men from IR 340 perished in the sinking.
Frielinghaus	Germany	World War II: First Battle of Narvik: The cargo ship was sunk in the Norwegian Sea off Narvik in a battle between British and German destroyers.
HMS Hardy	Royal Navy	World War II: First Battle of Narvik: The H-class destroyer was shelled, damaged and beached in Ofotfjord, Norway. She subsequently capsized and sank with the loss of 36 of her 175 crew.
Hein Hoyer	Germany	World War II: First Battle of Narvik: The cargo ship was sunk in the Norwegian Sea off Narvik in a battle between British and German destroyers. She was refloated in 1952–53, repaired and entered West German service.
HMS Hunter	Royal Navy	World War II: First Battle of Narvik: The H-class destroyer (1,350/1,883 t, 1936) was shelled, damaged and ran aground in Ofotfjord, Norway. She was then rammed by HMS Hotspur (Royal Navy) and sunk with the loss of 122 of her 166 crew.
Königsberg	Kriegsmarine	World War II: Operation Weserübung: The Königsberg-class cruiser was bombed and sunk at Bergen, Norway by Blackburn Skua of 800 and 803 Naval Air Squadrons, Fleet Air Arm. Eighteen crew members were killed.
Martha Heindrik Fisser	Germany	World War II: First Battle of Narvik: The cargo ship was sunk in the Norwegian Sea off Narvik in a battle between British and German destroyers.
Muansa	Germany	World War II: Operation Weserübung: The cargo ship struck a mine and sank in the Oslofjord.
Neuenfels	Germany	World War II: First Battle of Narvik: The cargo ship was damaged in the Norwegian Sea off Narvik in a battle between British and German destroyers. Two crew members were killed. She was scuttled by her crew.
Rauenfels	Kriegsmarine	World War II: Operation Weserübung: The supply ship was shelled, set afire and sunk when the fires reached her cargo of ammunition in Ofotfjord, near Narvik by HMS Havock and HMS Hostile (both Royal Navy). Her captain and 18 crewmen were rescued/captured by HMS Havock, the rest of crew rowed ashore and were captured by Norwegian troops.
Saphir	Norway	World War II: First Battle of Narvik: The cargo ship was sunk in the Norwegian Sea off Narvik in a battle between British and German destroyers. The wreck was raised in May 1958 and scrapped.
Stråssa	Sweden	World War II: First Battle of Narvik: The cargo ship was damaged by Royal Navy torpedoes and being shelled by British and German destroyers off Narvik. She exploded and sank on 11 May.
Sveaborg	Sweden	Sveaborg burning after being torpedoed World War II: The tanker was torpedoed and sunk in the Atlantic Ocean west of the Faroe Islands (62°52′N 7°34′W) by U-37 (Kriegsmarine) with the loss of five of her 34 crew. Survivors were rescued by HMT Northern Chief (Royal Navy.
HMS Tarpon	Royal Navy	World War II: The T-class submarine was depth charged and sunk in the Skagerrak by the naval trawler Schiff 40 (Kriegsmarine), a Q-ship, with the loss of all 53 crew.
HMS Thistle	Royal Navy	World War II: Operation Weserübung: The T-class submarine was torpedoed and sunk in the North Sea off the coast of Norway by U-4 (Kriegsmarine) with the loss of all 53 crew. Wreck located in 2023.
Tosca	Norway	World War II: The cargo ship was torpedoed and sunk in the Atlantic Ocean west of the Faroe Islands (62°52′N 7°34′W) by U-37 (Kriegsmarine) with the loss of two of her 34 crew. Survivors were rescued by HMT Northern Chief (Royal Navy).
V 705 Carsten	Kriegsmarine	World War II: The vorpostenboot was torpedoed and sunk.
V 1507 Rau VI	Kriegsmarine	World War II: Operation Weserübung: The vorpostenboot was torpedoed and sunk in the Skagerrak off the Pater Noster Lighthouse by HMS Triton (Royal Navy). Nineteen crew members were killed.
Wigbert	Kriegsmarine	World War II: Operation Weserübung: The troopship was torpedoed and sunk in the Skagerrak off the Pater Noster Lighthouse by HMS Triton (Royal Navy).
Z21 Wilhelm Heidkamp	Kriegsmarine	World War II: First Battle of Narvik: The Type 1936-class destroyer was torpedoed and sunk in the Norwegian Sea off Narvik by HMS Hardy (Royal Navy).

== 11 April ==
List of shipwrecks: 11 April 1940
Ship	State	Description
August Leonhardt	Kriegsmarine	World War II: Operation Weserübung: The troopship was torpedoed and sunk in the Skagerrak (56°30′N 11°30′E) by HMS Sealion (Royal Navy).
HNoMS Hval IV	Royal Norwegian Navy	The auxiliary patrol vessel was lost on this date.
HNoMS Hval VI	Royal Norwegian Navy	The auxiliary patrol vessel was lost on this date.
HNoMS Hval VII	Royal Norwegian Navy	The auxiliary patrol vessel was lost on this date.
Ionia	Kriegsmarine	World War II: Operation Weserübung: The troopship was torpedoed and sunk in the Skagerrak off Larvik, Norway (58°30′N 10°35′E) by HMS Triad (Royal Navy).
Oscarsborg-Narvik	Norway	World War II: The car ferry was shelled and sunk without loss of life off Narvik.
Schiff 9 Koblenz	Kriegsmarine	World War II: The auxiliary patrol boat/naval trawler struck a mine off Bergen, Norway and sank.
Schiff 111	Kriegsmarine	The auxiliary minesweeper struck a rock in Sørfjorden and was beached in Kirkefjord to prevent sinking. Refloated the next day and towed to Bergen and withdrawn from service, with her crew transferred to other ships. She had been repaired and returned to service by 27 April.
V 105 Cremon	Kriegsmarine	World War II: The Vorpostenboot struck a mine and sank off Bergen while going to the aid of Schiff 9 Koblenz (Kriegsmarine).
HNoMS William Barents	Royal Norwegian Navy	The auxiliary patrol vessel was lost on this date.

== 12 April ==
List of shipwrecks: 12 April 1940
Ship	State	Description
Chasseur 107	French Navy	The submarine chaser collided with Shelspra (France) and sank in the Loire.
HMS Eskimo	Royal Navy	HMS Eskimo World War II: Second Battle of Narvik: The Tribal-class destroyer was torpedoed and severely damaged by Z2 Georg Thiele (Kriegsmarine) off Narvik, Norway. HMS Eskimo was subsequently repaired, she returned to service in September 1940.
Moonsund	Kriegsmarine	World War II: The naval tanker was intercepted in the Skagerrak off Larvik, Norway by HMS Snapper (Royal Navy). She was shelled and sunk.
Polarfuchs	Kriegsmarine	World War II: The disarmed offshore fisheries patrol vessel (300 t, 1901), captured from the Norwegians three days earlier, was bombed and damaged by British Fairey Swordfish aircraft from HMS Furious (Royal Navy) in Narvik harbour. She sank the next day. Later raised and designated V 6730, but was not commissioned.
Schürbek	Kriegsmarine	The auxiliary cruiser was torpedoed by a Royal Navy submarine in the Skaggerak and was damaged. She was subsequently repaired and returned to service as Sperrbrecher 18.
Senja	Kriegsmarine	World War II: The captured Norwegian offshore patrol vessel, manned by a prize crew from Z17 Diether von Roeder (Kriegsmarine), was bombed and sunk by British Fairey Swordfish aircraft of 818 Naval Air Squadron from HMS Furious (Royal Navy) in Narvik harbour. Later raised and pressed into Kriegsmarine service.
HNoMS Sperm	Royal Norwegian Navy	World War II: The guard ship was scuttled by her own crew at Vikedal to prevent capture by the Germans.
Stancliffe	United Kingdom	World War II: The cargo ship was torpedoed and sunk in the North Sea 45 nautical miles (83 km) north east of the Shetland Islands by U-37 (Kriegsmarine) with the loss of 22 of her 38 crew.
HNoMS Storm	Royal Norwegian Navy	The torpedo boat ran aground at Stangholmene. She was beached, and sank the next day.
Torne	Sweden	World War II: The cargo ship was scuttled by Germans at Narvik. Her crew had abandoned her two days before.
Velocitas	Netherlands	World War II: The coaster struck a mine and sank in the North Sea east of Margate, Kent, United Kingdom (51°25′N 1°50′E) with the loss of three of her five crew. Survivors were rescued by Mavis (United Kingdom).

== 13 April ==
List of shipwrecks: 13 April 1940
Ship	State	Description
Z11 Bernd von Arnim	Kriegsmarine	Z11 Bernd von Arnim World War II: Second Battle of Narvik: The Type 1934A-class destroyer was scuttled in the Norwegian Sea off Narvik, Norway.
Cate B.	Norway	World War II: The cargo ship was torpedoed sunk in the Norwegian Sea off Narvik, Norway in a battle between British and German warships. She was hit by a torpedo from a Royal Navy ship and one from Z18 Hans Lüdemann (Kriegsmarine). Cate B was salvaged in 1954 and scrapped in 1955.
Z17 Diether von Roeder	Kriegsmarine	World War II: Second Battle of Narvik: The Type 1936-class destroyer was sunk in the Norwegian Sea off Narvik by HMS Warspite (Royal Navy) and other Royal Navy destroyers.
Z12 Erich Giese	Kriegsmarine	World War II: Second Battle of Narvik: The Type 1934A-class destroyer was sunk in the Norwegian Sea off Narvik by HMS Warspite (Royal Navy) and other Royal Navy destroyers. Eighty-three crewmen were killed, 82 were captured.
Z13 Erich Koellner	Kriegsmarine	World War II: Second Battle of Narvik: The Type 1934A-class destroyer was shelled and damaged in the Norwegian Sea off Narvik by HMS Warspite (Royal Navy) and other Royal Navy destroyers. She was subsequently scuttled. Thirty-one of her 186 crew were killed.
HNoMS Frøya	Royal Norwegian Navy	World War II: Norwegian Campaign: The minelayer was scuttled in Trondheimsfjord, Norway. She was then torpedoed and destroyed by U-34 (Kriegsmarine).
Gazelle	Germany	World War II: The fishing trawler was sunk by enemy action.
Z2 Georg Thiele	Kriegsmarine	World War II: Second Battle of Narvik: The Type 1934-class destroyer was scuttled in the Norwegian Sea off Narvik.
Z18 Hans Lüdemann	Kriegsmarine	World War II: Second Battle of Narvik: The Type 1936-class destroyer was scuttled in the Norwegian Sea off Narvik.
Z19 Hermann Künne	Kriegsmarine	Hermann Künne World War II: Second Battle of Narvik: The Type 1936-class destroyer was sunk in the Norwegian Sea off Narvik by HMS Eskimo (Royal Navy).
Jan Wellem	Kriegsmarine	World War II: The fleet tanker was sunk in the Norwegian Sea off Narvik in a battle between British and German warships. She was refloated in July or August, and partly repaired, but was later scuttled. The wreck had been refloated by 1946 and was subsequently scrapped.
HNoMS Kelt	Royal Norwegian Navy	World War II: The disarmed patrol boat was bombed and sunk by Fleet Air Arm Fairey Swordfish aircraft from HMS Furious (Royal Navy) in Narvik harbour.
M-1108 Dr. Eichelbaum	Kriegsmarine	World War II: The minesweeper was sunk in a collision with Scandia (Denmark) in the Great Belt, south-west of Omø, Denmark (55°05′N 11°04′E). There was one dead.
Öxelösund	Sweden	World War II: The cargo ship was sunk in the Norwegian Sea off Narvik in a battle between British and German warships.
Rødskjæl	Norway	World War II: The tanker was sunk in the Norwegian Sea off Narvik in a battle between British and German warships.
Styrbjörn	Sweden	World War II: The tug was sunk in the Norwegian Sea off Narvik in a battle between British and German warships.
U-64	Kriegsmarine	World War II: Second Battle of Narvik: The Type IXB submarine was bombed and sunk in the Herjangsfjord off Bjerkvik, Norway, by a Fairey Swordfish aircraft from HMS Warspite (Royal Navy) with the loss of eight of her 46 crew.
Z9 Wolfgang Zenker	Kriegsmarine	Wolfgang Zenker. (top). The other vessel is Bernd von Arnim. World War II: Second Battle of Narvik: The Type 1934A-class destroyer was scuttled in the Norwegian Sea off Narvik.

== 14 April ==
List of shipwrecks: 14 April 1940
Ship	State	Description
Bärenfels	Kriegsmarine	World War II: The supply ship was bombed and sunk at Bergen, Norway by Blackburn Skua aircraft of 800 and 803 Naval Air Squadrons, Fleet Air Arm. She was refloated, repaired and back in service by October 1941.
Brummer	Kriegsmarine	World War II: Operation Weserübung: The auxiliary gunnery training ship was torpedoed and severely damaged in the Kattegat by HMS Sterlet (Royal Navy). She capsized and sank the next day.
Disperser	United Kingdom	The salvage ship sank in the North Sea off Kirkwall, Orkney Islands. All twelve hands were lost.
Florida	Kriegsmarine	World War II: Operation Weserübung: The troopship was torpedoed and sunk in the North Sea off Orust, Sweden (57°59′N 10°51′E) by HMS Snapper (Royal Navy).
Joyous	United Kingdom	World War II: Convoy KM 472: The cargo ship collided with the tanker Ingenerio Luis A. Huergo (Argentina) and sank off the mouth of the Paraná River.
M-1101 Fock & Hubert	Kriegsmarine	World War II: The minesweeper struck a mine laid by HMS Narwhal (Royal Navy) in Kattegat. She was beached in the Oslofjord, Norway the next day.
Nyborg	Denmark	World War II: The ferry struck a mine and sank in the Kattegat off Sprogø, Denmark.
Ölschiff 3	Kriegsmarine	World War II: The tanker was sunk in the Atlantic Ocean (64°05′N 8°00′E) by HMS Suffolk (Royal Navy).
Planet	Germany	World War II: The cargo ship was sunk at Narvik, Norway by Royal Navy ships. She was refloated on 8 October, repaired and returned to service.
Oldenburg	Kriegsmarine	World War II: The decoy ship was torpedoed and sunk in the Skagerrak (57°50′N 11°15′E) by HMS Sunfish (Royal Navy). Forty-five of her 110 crew were killed.
Skagerrak	Kriegsmarine	World War II: The naval tanker was intercepted in the Norwegian Sea north west of Vågsøy, Norway (64°05′N 2°00′E) by HMS Suffolk (Royal Navy) and was scuttled.
HNoMS Teist	Royal Norwegian Navy	World War II: The 2.-class torpedo boat (92/103 t, 1907) was scuttled in the Skagerrak off Herad, Norway to prevent capture by German forces.

== 15 April ==
List of shipwrecks: 15 April 1940
Ship	State	Description
HNoMS A-3	Royal Norwegian Navy	World War II: The A-class submarine was scuttled at Tønsberg.
HNoMS A-4	Royal Norwegian Navy	World War II: The A-class submarine was scuttled at Tønsberg.
Bernisse	Netherlands	World War II: The cargo ship was scuttled at Narvik, Norway by her German prize crew after being heavily damaged by gunfire from the British warships that attacked the port. There were no casualties.
Mersington Court	United Kingdom	World War II: The cargo ship was sunk off Narvik. Thirty-six crew were rescued; 28 of them were made prisoners of war. She was refloated in 1952 and beached. Subsequently sold for use as a hulk in Belgium.
M-1701 H. M. Behrens	Kriegsmarine	World War II: The minesweeper was torpedoed and sunk in the Kattegat (57°55′N 10°53′E) by HMS Snapper (Royal Navy).
M-1702 Carsten Janssen	Kriegsmarine	World War II: The minesweeper was torpedoed and sunk in the Kattegat (57°55′N 10°53′E) by HMS Snapper (Royal Navy).
North Cornwall	United Kingdom	World War II: The cargo ship was sunk off Narvik with some loss of life. Seventeen survivors were rescued, of whom four were interned in Sweden. She was refloated in May 1953 and scrapped.
U-49	Kriegsmarine	World War II: The Type VIIB submarine was depth charged and sunk in the Norwegian Sea off Harstad, Norway by HMS Brazen and HMS Fearless (both Royal Navy) with the loss of one of her 42 crew.
Vp 811	Kriegsmarine	The vorpostensicherungsschiff sank in the North Sea. She was later salvaged, repaired and returned to service.

== 16 April ==
List of shipwrecks: 16 April 1940
Ship	State	Description
Leonora	United Kingdom	The fishing trawler sank in the North Sea 60 nautical miles (110 km) east of Scarborough, Yorkshire.
Mertainen	Sweden	World War II: The cargo ship was bombed and sunk in the Trondheimsfjord, Norway by Heinkel He 111 aircraft of II Staffeln, Kampfgeschwader 4, Luftwaffe.
V 1703 Unitas IV	Kriegsmarine	World War II: The vorpostenboot was torpedoed and sunk by HMS Narwhal (Royal Navy). She was later raised, repaired and returned to service.

== 17 April ==
List of shipwrecks: 17 April 1940
Ship	State	Description
Juniata	United Kingdom	World War II: The tanker was scuttled as a blockship in Water Sound, Scapa Flow, Orkney Islands. Refloated in 1949 and beached in Inganess Bay.
Swainby	United Kingdom	World War II: The cargo ship was torpedoed and sunk in the North Sea 25 nautical miles (46 km) north east of Muckle Flugga, Shetland Islands (61°03′N 0°14′W) by U-13 (Kriegsmarine). All 38 crew were rescued.

== 18 April ==
List of shipwrecks: 18 April 1940
Ship	State	Description
HNoMS Grib	Royal Norwegian Navy	World War II: The 2.-class torpedo boat was scuttled south of Lyngør to prevent capture by German forces.
Hamm	Kriegsmarine	World War II: The troopship was torpedoed and damaged in the Skagerrak south east of Skagen, Denmark (58°09′N 10°32′E) by HMS Seawolf (Royal Navy). She sank in the early hours of the next day.
Invicta	Denmark	World War II: The fishing vessel was destroyed by an explosion, probably a mine, and sank in the Skagerrak off Skagen with the loss of two lives.
HNoMS Jo	Royal Norwegian Navy	World War II: The 2.-class torpedo boatwas damaged by Dornier Do 17 aircraft of the Luftwaffe, then run aground and scuttled south of Lyngør to prevent capture by German forces.
HNoMS Ravn	Royal Norwegian Navy	World War II: The 2.-class torpedo boat was scuttled south of Lyngør to prevent capture by German forces.
HNoMS Sæl	Royal Norwegian Navy	World War II: Norwegian campaign: The 1.-class torpedo boat was sunk in Hardangerfjord during a battle with three Kriegsmarine E-boats.
HMS Sterlet	Royal Navy	World War II: The S-class submarine was sunk in the Skagerrak south of Larvik, Norway; possibly sunk by M-75 and T-190 (both Kriegsmarine), or sunk by a mine later.

== 19 April ==
List of shipwrecks: 19 April 1940
Ship	State	Description
Jaunjelgava	Soviet Union	The cargo ship collided with Thor (Germany) in the Baltic Sea off the coast of Germany and sank. The crew of fifteen survived in lifeboats.

== 20 April ==
List of shipwrecks: 20 April 1940
Ship	State	Description
Hawnby	United Kingdom	World War II: The cargo ship struck a mine and sank in the North Sea off the north coast of Kent (51°32′00″N 1°12′36″E). All 39 crew were rescued by HM MTB-4 (Royal Navy).
Mersey	United Kingdom	World War II: The cargo ship struck a mine and sank in The Downs, Kent (51°17′N 1°28′E) with the loss of fourteen of her 21 crew.
HMS Rutlandshire	Royal Navy	World War II: The anti-submarine warfare trawler was bombed and sunk in the Namsenfjorden off Namsos, Norway by aircraft of Kampfgeschwader 26, Luftwaffe.
Schiff 18	Kriegsmarine	World War II: The auxiliary ship was damaged by HNoMS Tyr (Royal Norwegian Navy) and beached at Uskedal, Norway.
HNoMS Smart	Royal Norwegian Navy	World War II: The auxiliary patrol vessel was shelled and sunk at Uskedal by Bremse (Kriegsmarine).
HNoMS Stegg	Royal Norwegian Navy	World War II: Norwegian campaign: The Trygg-class torpedo boat was sunk in the Hardangerfjord, Norway by Schiff 221 (Kriegsmarine).

== 21 April ==
List of shipwrecks: 21 April 1940
Ship	State	Description
Cedarbank	United Kingdom	World War II: Convoy AP 1: The cargo ship was torpedoed and sunk in the Norwegian Sea off Norway (62°49′N 4°10′E) by U-26 (Kriegsmarine) with the loss of fifteen of her 45 crew. Survivors were rescued by HMS Javelin (Royal Navy).
Hercules II	United Kingdom	World War II: The fishing trawler was bombed and sunk in the North Sea by Luftwaffe aircraft.
Jürgen Fritzen	Germany	The cargo ship ran aground and sank in the Kattegat off Landsort, Sweden.
Penn	United Kingdom	World War II: The fishing trawler was bombed and sunk in the North Sea by Luftwaffe aircraft.

== 22 April ==
List of shipwrecks: 22 April 1940
Ship	State	Description
Bep	Netherlands	World War II: The fishing vessel was sunk in the North Sea of Terschelling, Friesland by a Kriegsmarine E-boat. Her crew were rescued.
Bravore	Norway	World War II: The cargo shi struck a mine and sank in the North Sea off Ramsgate, Kent, United Kingdom (51°18′30″N 1°30′54″E) with the loss of seventeen of the 24 people on board. The wreck was subsequently dispersed by explosives.
Delamore	Germany	The coaster struck a rock and sank at Marsteinen, Norway. Salvage attempts were unsuccessful.
Sigurd Jarl	Norway	World War II: The cargo ship was bombed and set on fire in Moldefjord, Norway by Luftwaffe aircraft. She sank the next day. The wreck was raised in 1942 but not repaired and sold for scrapping in 1947.
Tumleren	Denmark	World War II: The fishing vessel was destroyed by an explosion, probably a mine, and sank between Fyn and Langenland. Her crew were rescued.
Wocana	Netherlands	World War II: The skoot was intercepted by, and collided with, HMS Pintail (Royal Navy) in the North Sea off Great Yarmouth, Norfolk, United Kingdom and sank.

== 23 April ==
List of shipwrecks: 23 April 1940
Ship	State	Description
Lolworth	United Kingdom	World War II: The cargo ship struck a mine and sank in the North Sea east of Ramsgate, Kent, the United Kingdom (51°22′N 1°26′E) with the loss of two of her 24 crew.
Progres	Denmark	World War II: The steamship was destroyed by an explosion, probably a mine, and sank off the Drogden Lighthouse, Denmark, with the loss of five lives.
M 1302 Schwaben	Kriegsmarine	World War II: The auxiliary minesweeper struck a mine and sank in the Kattegat.
Sayn	Germany	World War II: The cargo ship struck a mine and sank in the Wadden Sea off Borkum.
UJ-B Treff V	Kriegsmarine	World War II: The auxiliary submarine hunter/naval whaler was torpedoed and sunk in the Skagerrak (58°21′N 10°24′E) by HMS Tetrarch (Royal Navy). There were only three survivors.

== 24 April ==
List of shipwrecks: 24 April 1940
Ship	State	Description
Cronshagen	Germany	World War II: The cargo ship struck a mine off Copenhagen, Denmark and sank.
Girasol	United Kingdom	The cargo ship collided with Contractor (United Kingdom) and sank in the North Sea north of Margate, Kent. All eleven crew were rescued by Richard (Belgium).
Haxby	United Kingdom	World War II: The cargo ship was torpedoed and sunk in the Caribbean Sea north east of the Dominican Republic (31°30′N 51°30′W) by Orion (Kriegsmarine) with the loss of seventeen of her 40 crew. Survivors were taken as prisoners of war, but were later rescued by HMS Truant (Royal Navy).
Riverton	Germany	World War II: The cargo ship was shelled and sunk in the Norwegian Sea at Narvik, Norway by HMS Effingham (Royal Navy). Thirty-three of her crew were interned in Sweden.
Rydal Force	United Kingdom	World War II: The cargo ship struck a mine and sank in the North Sea off Ramsgate, Kent with the loss of eleven of her thirteen crew. Survivors were rescued by HMT Sarah Hide (Royal Navy).
Stokesley	United Kingdom	World War II: The cargo ship struck a mine and sank in the Thames Estuary north of Birchington, Kent (51°32′N 1°16′E) with the loss of fifteen crew.

== 25 April ==
List of shipwrecks: 25 April 1940
Ship	State	Description
Afrika	Germany	World War II: The cargo ship, which had been captured by the torpedo boat HNoMS Stegg (Royal Norwegian Navy) on 9 April, was scuttled in Hardangerfjord off Ulvik, Norway during a German attempt at recapture.
Bobby	Panama	The cargo ship collided with Midsland (Netherlands) and sank in the English Channel, 3 nautical miles (5.6 km) south east of Dungeness, Kent, United Kingdom. All 28 crew were rescued by Midsland.
HMT Bradman	Royal Navy	World War II: The naval trawler was bombed and sunk in the Romsdalsfjord, Norway by aircraft of Kampfgeschwader 26, Luftwaffe. She was later salvaged and entered German service as V 6111 Friese.
Brand IV	Norway	World War II: The hospital ship was bombed in the Norwegian Sea off Ålesund by Luftwaffe aircraft and ran aground.
Folden	Norway	World War II: The coaster was bombed and damaged off Tonnes by Luftwaffe aircraft. She was beached with the loss of at least six of the 21 people on board. Although condemned as a total loss, she was repaired and returned to service in July 1944.
Haardraade	Norway	World War II: The cargo ship was bombed and sunk at Leirvik by Royal Air Force aircraft with the loss of a crew member. She was later raised, repaired and returned to service as Hodnaberg.
HMT Hammond	Royal Navy	World War II: The naval trawler was bombed and sunk in the Norwegian Sea off Åndalsnes, Norway by aircraft of Kampfgeschwader 26, Luftwaffe. She was salvaged by the Germans in 1942, repaired and entered Kriegsmarine service as V 6115 Salier in 1945.
HMT Larwood	Royal Navy	World War II: The naval trawler was bombed and sunk in Fannefjord off Molde, Norway by aircraft of Kampfgeschwader 26, Luftwaffe. She was salvaged by the Germans in 1940, repaired and entered Kriegsmarine service as V 6107 Franke.
Margham Abbey	United Kingdom	World War II: Convoy FS 53: The cargo ship struck a mine and sank in the Thames Estuary north of Herne Bay, Kent (51°32′10″N 1°08′31″E). All 23 crew were rescued.
Palime	Germany	World War II: The cargo ship was torpedoed and severely damaged in the North Sea (57°20′N 6°10′E) by HMS Trident (Royal Navy). She then struck a mine and was beached at "Jaederensrev". She was later refloated and returned to service.
San Miguel	Norway	World War II: The cargo ship was scuttled in the Hardangerfjord off Ulvik by Norwegian troops during a German attempt at capture. She was later raised, repaired and returned to service
Schiff 18 Alteland	Kriegsmarine	World War II: The armed auxiliary was severely damaged at Kinsarvik, Norway by Norwegian troops firing machine guns and a lorry-mounted naval gun. She was beached at Utne, Norway.
HNoMS Trygg	Royal Norwegian Navy	World War II: Åndalsnes landings: The Trygg-class torpedo boat was bombed and sunk in the Romsdalsfjord off Åndalsnes by Luftwaffe aircraft. She was salvaged by the Germans, repaired and entered Kriegsmarine service as Zick.

== 26 April ==
List of shipwrecks: 26 April 1940
Ship	State	Description
HNoMS Garm	Royal Norwegian Navy	World War II: The Draug-class destroyer (468/578 t, 1914) was bombed and sunk in the Sognefjord by Luftwaffe aircraft. Her crew had abandoned ship when the attack came as she had no effective anti-aircraft weapons to defend herself with, hence no casualties were incurred during her sinking.
Gloria	Netherlands	World War II: The fishing vessel vanished in the North Sea, and probably struck a mine and sank off Terschelling, Friesland with the loss of all seven hands.
Lily	Denmark	World War II: The cargo ship was torpedoed and sunk in the North Sea off Kinlochbervie, Sutherland, United Kingdom by U-13 (Kriegsmarine) with the loss of 24 crew. Lily was on a voyage from Kirkwall, Orkney Islands, United Kingdom to Aarhus.
Schiff 37 Schleswig	Kriegsmarine	World War II: The naval trawler was shelled and sunk west of Ålesund, Norway (62°37′N 4°00′E) by HMS Birmingham (Royal Navy) with the loss of all hands.
Willy	Netherlands	World War II: The fishing vessel struck a mine and sank in the North Sea off Terschelling with the loss of all ten hands.

== 27 April ==
List of shipwrecks: 27 April 1940
Ship	State	Description
Athelstan	United Kingdom	The fishing trawler was last seen by the fishing trawler Claire (United Kingdom) at 54°00′N 1°55′E. No further trace, lost with all nine crew.
Bodenwinkel	Germany	World War II: The pilot boat struck a mine and sank in the Hubertgat, west of Borkum, Denmark. Her crew were rescued.
Lise	Denmark	World War II: The fishing vessel was destroyed by an explosion, probably a mine, in the Øresund. Three crew were killed.
Nyhaug	Norway	World War II: The cargo ship was bombed and sunk at Lepsøya by Luftwaffe aircraft. She was later raised, repaired and returned to service as Holla.
Thornhill	United Kingdom	The coaster collided with Circe (France) in the English Channel off Start Point, Devon and sank with the loss of a crew member.

== 28 April ==
List of shipwrecks: 28 April 1940
Ship	State	Description
Capella	Norway	World War II: The cargo ship was bombed and sunk in Tingvollfjorden by Luftwaffe aircraft. She was raised in 1943, repaired and returned to service as Hillevaag in July 1943.
HMT Cape Siretoko	Royal Navy	World War II: The naval trawler was bombed and sunk in the Norwegian Sea off the west coast of Norway by aircraft of Kampfgeschwader 26, Luftwaffe. She was raised, repaired and entered Kriegsmarine service as V 6113 Gote.
Gallus	Norway	World War II: The coaster was bombed and sunk off Kristiansund by Luftwaffe aircraft. She was later raised and returned to service.
Svanholm	Norway	World War II: The coaster was bombed and sunk off Tustna by Luftwaffe aircraft. She was raised in 1940. Subsequently repaired, and returned to service in 1942 as Bergfin.

== 29 April ==
List of shipwrecks: 29 April 1940
Ship	State	Description
Begonia	Estonia	World War II: The cargo ship had been bombed and damaged in Aurlandsfjord off Flåm, Norway by Luftwaffe aircraft on 25 April. One crewman was killed. She was scuttled by the Norwegian military four days after the bombing.
HMT Cape Chelyuskin	Royal Navy	World War II: The naval trawler was bombed and in the Norwegian Sea sunk off Trondheim, Norway by Luftwaffe aircraft.
HMT Jardine	Royal Navy	World War II: The naval trawler was bombed and damaged in the Norwegian Sea off Trondheim by aircraft of Kampfgeschwader 26, Luftwaffe. She was judged to be unfit to cross the North Sea and was scuttled by the Royal Navy the next day. She was later salvaged by the Germans and entered service as V-6117.
Ørland	Norway	World War II: The cargo ship was bombed and sunk in the North Sea off Midsund, Norway by Luftwaffe aircraft. Her crew survived.
HMS Unity	Royal Navy	The U-class submarine collided with Atle Jarl (Norway) off the mouth of the River Tyne (55°13′N 1°19′W) and sank with the loss of two of her 27 crew.
Whitetoft	United Kingdom	The cargo ship ran aground at Robin Hood's Bay, Yorkshire and was wrecked.

== 30 April ==
List of shipwrecks: 30 April 1940
Ship	State	Description
HNoMS Alversund	Royal Norwegian Navy	World War II: The guard ship was scuttled by her own crew near Stord to prevent capture by the Germans.
HMT Aston Villa	Royal Navy	World War II: Namsos Campaign: The Anti-submarine warfare trawler was bombed and damaged in the Norwegian Sea off Namsos, Norway, by Junkers Ju 87 aircraft of the Luftwaffe. She was scuttled on 3 May.
Athelstan	United Kingdom	World War II: The fishing trawler was bombed and sunk in the North Sea by Luftwaffe aircraft.
Bittern	Royal Navy	World War II: Namsos Campaign: The Bittern-class sloop was bombed and damaged in the Norwegian Sea off Namsos by Luftwaffe aircraft. She was subsequently scuttled by HMS Carlisle (Royal Navy).
RFA Boardale	Royal Fleet Auxiliary	The tanker ran aground off Straume, Norway (68°43′00″N 14°24′30″E). She sank on 2 May.
HMS Dunoon	Royal Navy	World War II: The Hunt-class minesweeper struck a mine and sank in the North Sea off Great Yarmouth, Norfolk (52°45′N 2°23′E) with the loss of 26 of her 73 crew.
HMT Gaul	Royal Navy	World War II: The naval trawler was bombed and damaged in the Norwegian Sea off Namsos by Luftwaffe aircraft. She was scuttled on 3 May.
Leopard	Kriegsmarine	World War II:The 1924 Raubtier-class torpedoboat (932/1,319 t, 1929) collided with the minelayer Preussen (Kriegsmarine) in the Skagerrak and sank. One crew was killed. The remaining crew were rescued by Wolf (Kriegsmarine).
Maillé Brézé	French Navy	The Vauquelin-class destroyer (2,402/3,070 t, 1932) was sunk at Greenock, Renfrewshire, United Kingdom by the accidental explosion of two of its own torpedoes with the loss of 25 of her 220 crew.
Saturnus	Norway	World War II: The cargo ship (956 GRT, 1930) was bombed and sunk in the Todalsfjord, Norway by Luftwaffe aircraft. Later raised, repaired and returned to service.
HMT St Goran	Royal Navy	World War II: Namsos Campaign: The anti-submarine warfare trawler was bombed and severely damaged off Namsos by Luftwaffe aircraft. She was subsequently bombed again and sunk the next day.
HMT Warwickshire	Royal Navy	World War II: The naval trawler was bombed and sunk in the Norwegian Sea off Åndalsnes, Norway by aircraft of Kampfgeschwader 26, Luftwaffe. She was salvaged by the Germans and entered Kriegsmarine service as V 6113 Alane.

== Unknown date ==
List of shipwrecks: Unknown date 1940
Ship	State	Description
Freilinghaus	Germany	World War II: The cargo ship was sunk at Narvik, Norway between 10 and 13 April. She was later refloated, repaired and returned to service.
Kreta	Germany	The transport ship sank in the Oslofjord. She was refloated on 22 May. Subsequently repaired and returned to service.
Ruhrort	Germany	World War II: The cargo ship was captured in the Norwegian Sea off Vemøya, Norway on 12 April by HNoMS Commonwealth, HNoMS Sleipner, and HNoMS Trygg (all Royal Norwegian Navy). She was later abandoned and thereafter sunk by Luftwaffe aircraft.
Seminole	United Kingdom	World War II: Convoy HX 34: The cargo ship struck a mine and was beached. She was later refloated, repaired and returned to service.
Tugela	Norway	World War II: The cargo shipwas scuttled at Oslo. She was later raised, repaired and entered German service.
U-1	Kriegsmarine	The Type IIA submarine reported by radio from the North Sea for the last time on 6 April 1940, then disappeared without trace.
