= German trawler V 1507 Rau VI =

German Vorpostenboot

History

Nazi Germany
- Name: Rau VI
- Fate: Torpedoed and sunk by HMS Triton on 15 April 1940.

General characteristics
- Class & type: Converted trawler
- Tonnage: 354 grt

V 1507 Rau VI was a German trawler which was converted into a Vorpostenboot for the Kriegsmarine during World War II.

== History ==
Rau VI participated in the German invasion of Denmark as a part of the 2nd German Transport Convoy, escorting the transport boats Friedenau and Wigbert. The British submarine HMS Triton spotted the convoy in the Kattegat on the afternoon of 10 April 1940. Triton launched six torpedoes, sinking both transports and Rau VI. Nine hundred soldiers from the 196th Infantry Division who were embarked on the transports drowned.
