= HNoMS Stegg =

Two ships of the Royal Norwegian Navy have borne the name HNoMS Stegg. Stegg is the Norwegian term for the male grouse.:

- HNoMS Stegg (1921) was a Trygg-class torpedo boat launched in 1921 and sunk by Kriegsmarine vessels in the Hardangerfjord on 20 April 1940.
- HNoMS Stegg (P994) was a Hauk-class fast patrol boat commissioned on 18 March 1980 and decommissioned by 2008.
