= German submarine U-13 (1935) =

German World War II submarine

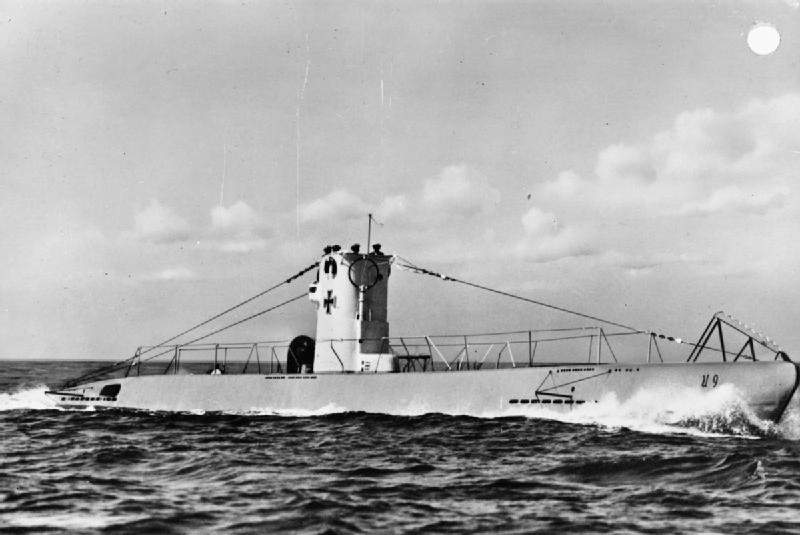
- U-9, a typical Type IIB boat

History

Nazi Germany
- Name: U-13
- Ordered: 2 February 1935
- Builder: Deutsche Werke, Kiel
- Yard number: 248
- Laid down: 20 June 1935
- Launched: 9 November 1935
- Commissioned: 30 November 1935
- Fate: Sunk 31 May 1940, in the North Sea

General characteristics
- Class & type: Type IIB coastal submarine
- Displacement: 279 t (275 long tons) surfaced; 328 t (323 long tons) submerged
- Length: 42.70 m (140 ft 1 in) o/a; 27.80 m (91 ft 2 in) pressure hull
- Beam: 4.08 m (13 ft 5 in) (o/a); 4.00 m (13 ft 1 in) (pressure hull)
- Height: 8.60 m (28 ft 3 in)
- Draught: 3.90 m (12 ft 10 in)
- Installed power: 700 PS (510 kW; 690 bhp) (diesels); 410 PS (300 kW; 400 shp) (electric)
- Propulsion: 2 shafts; 2 × diesel engines; 2 × electric motors
- Speed: 13 knots (24 km/h; 15 mph) surfaced; 7 knots (13 km/h; 8.1 mph) submerged
- Range: 1,800 nmi (3,300 km; 2,100 mi) at 12 knots (22 km/h; 14 mph) surfaced; 35–43 nmi (65–80 km; 40–49 mi) at 4 knots (7.4 km/h; 4.6 mph) submerged
- Test depth: 80 m (260 ft)
- Complement: 3 officers, 22 men
- Armament: 3 × 53.3 cm (21 in) torpedo tubes; 5 × torpedoes or up to 12 TMA or 18 TMB mines; 1 × 2 cm (0.79 in) anti-aircraft gun

Service record
- Part of: 1st U-boat Flotilla; 1 November 1935 – 1 August 1939; 1 September 1939 – 31 May 1940
- Identification codes: M 15 421
- Commanders: Oblt.z.S. / Kptlt. Hans-Gerrit von Stockhausen; 30 November 1935 – 30 September 1937; Oblt.z.S. / Kptlt. Karl Daublebsky von Eichhain; 1 October 1937 – 5 November 1939; Kptlt. Heinz Scheringer; 6 November 1939 – 2 January 1940; Oblt. Wolfgang Lüth; 16 – 28 December 1939; Oblt. Max-Martin Schulte; 3 January – 31 May 1940
- Operations: 9 patrols; 1st patrol: a. 25 – 31 August 1939; b. 2 – 6 September 1939; 2nd patrol: 11 September – 3 October 1939; 3rd patrol: 25 October – 3 November 1939; 4th patrol: 15 – 25 November 1939; 5th patrol: 9 – 15 December 1939; 6th patrol: 24 January – 5 February 1940; 7th patrol: a. 16 – 29 February 1940; b. 2 – 3 March 1940; c. 25 – 26 March 1940; 8th patrol: a. 31 March – 19 April 1940; b. 21 April – 2 May 1940; 9th patrol: 26 – 31 May 1940
- Victories: 9 merchant ships sunk (28,056 GRT); 3 merchant ships damaged (26,218 GRT)

German submarine U-13 was a Type IIB U-boat of Nazi Germany's Kriegsmarine which was commissioned on 30 November 1936, following construction at the Deutsche Werke shipyards at Kiel. The first commander on board was Hans-Gerrit von Stockhausen. In her career she completed nine patrols, all while serving with the 1st U-boat Flotilla. The U-boat succeeded in sinking nine ships and damaging three more.

== Design ==
German Type IIB submarines were enlarged versions of the original Type IIs. U-13 had a displacement of 279 tonnes (275 long tons) when at the surface and 328 tonnes (323 long tons) while submerged. Officially, the standard tonnage was 250 long tons (254 t), however. The U-boat had a total length of 42.70 m (140 ft 1 in), a pressure hull length of 28.20 m (92 ft 6 in), a beam of 4.08 m (13 ft 5 in), a height of 8.60 m (28 ft 3 in), and a draught of 3.90 m (12 ft 10 in). The submarine was powered by two MWM RS 127 S four-stroke, six-cylinder diesel engines of 700 metric horsepower (510 kW; 690 shp) for cruising, two Siemens-Schuckert PG VV 322/36 double-acting electric motors producing a total of 460 metric horsepower (340 kW; 450 shp) for use while submerged. She had two shafts and two 0.85 m (3 ft) propellers. The boat was capable of operating at depths of up to 80–150 metres (260–490 ft).

The submarine had a maximum surface speed of 12 knots (22 km/h; 14 mph) and a maximum submerged speed of 7 knots (13 km/h; 8.1 mph). When submerged, the boat could operate for 35–42 nautical miles (65–78 km; 40–48 mi) at 4 knots (7.4 km/h; 4.6 mph); when surfaced, she could travel 3,800 nautical miles (7,000 km; 4,400 mi) at 8 knots (15 km/h; 9.2 mph). U-13 was fitted with three 53.3 cm (21 in) torpedo tubes at the bow, five torpedoes or up to twelve Type A torpedo mines, and a 2 cm (0.79 in) anti-aircraft gun. The boat had a complement of twentyfive.

== Fate ==
U-13 was sunk on 31 May 1940, in the North Sea 11 nautical miles (20 km) south-east of Lowestoft, in position 52°26′N 02°02′E by depth charges from the British sloop HMS Weston. There were no casualties.

== Summary of raiding history ==
Date	Name	Nationality	Tonnage (GRT)	Fate
10 September 1939	Magdapur	United Kingdom	8,641	Sunk (mine)
16 September 1939	City of Paris	United Kingdom	10,902	Damaged (mine)
24 September 1939	Phryné	France	2,660	Sunk (mine)
30 October 1939	Cairnmona	United Kingdom	4,666	Sunk
19 November 1939	Bowling	United Kingdom	793	Sunk
6 January 1940	City of Marseilles	United Kingdom	8,317	Damaged (mine)
31 January 1940	Start	Norway	1,168	Sunk
1 February 1940	Fram	Sweden	2,491	Sunk
6 February 1940	Anu	Estonia	1,421	Sunk (mine)
17 April 1940	Swainby	United Kingdom	4,935	Sunk
26 April 1940	Lily	Denmark	1,281	Sunk
28 April 1940	Scottish American	United Kingdom	6,999	Damaged

== Bibliography ==
- Busch, Rainer; Röll, Hans-Joachim (1999). German U-boat commanders of World War II : a biographical dictionary. Translated by Brooks, Geoffrey. London, Annapolis, Md: Greenhill Books, Naval Institute Press. ISBN 1-55750-186-6.
- Gröner, Erich; Jung, Dieter; Maass, Martin (1991). U-boats and Mine Warfare Vessels. German Warships 1815–1945. Vol. 2. Translated by Thomas, Keith; Magowan, Rachel. London: Conway Maritime Press. ISBN 0-85177-593-4.
