= SS Phryné =

French cargo ship

History
- Name: Phryné
- Owner: Société Navale Caennaise (Lamy G. & Cie)
- Port of registry: Rouen, France
- Builder: Société des Chantiers de Normandie - Laporte & Cie.
- Completed: February 1939
- Fate: Struck a mine and sunk 24 September 1939

General characteristics
- Type: Cargo ship
- Tonnage: 2,660 GRT
- Length: 98.3 metres (322 ft 6 in)
- Beam: 13.3 metres (43 ft 8 in)
- Depth: 6.5 metres (21 ft 4 in)
- Installed power: Triple expansion steam engine
- Propulsion: Screw propeller
- Speed: 11 knots

SS Phryné was a French cargo ship that hit a mine laid by U-13 in the North Sea 3.5 nautical miles (6.5 km) off the Aldeburgh Lightship, while she was travelling from Immingham, United Kingdom to Bayonne, France.

== Construction ==
Phryné was constructed in 1938 at the Société des Chantiers de Normandie - Laporte & Cie. shipyard in Rouen, France. She was completed in 1939.

The ship was 98.3 metres (322 ft 6 in) long, with a beam of 13.3 metres (43 ft 8 in) and a depth of 6.5 metres (21 ft 4 in). The ship was assessed at 2,660 GRT. She had a Triple expansion steam engine driving a single screw propeller and one boiler. The engine was rated at 225 nhp.

== Sinking ==
On 24 September 1939, Phryné was on a voyage from Immingham, United Kingdom to Bayonne, France when she hit a mine laid by the German submarine U-13 in the North Sea. The crew were rescued by the Royal Navy destroyers Boreas and Brazen. There were no casualties.
