= HNoMS Stegg (1921) =

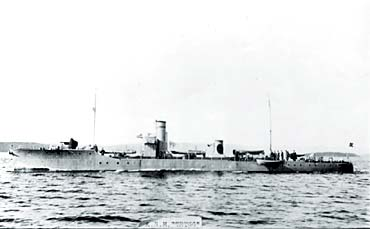
- HNoMS Trygg - HNoMS Stegg's sister ship

History

Norway
- Name: Stegg
- Namesake: the male grouse
- Builder: Horten Naval shipyard
- Yard number: 111
- Launched: 16 June 1921
- Out of service: 20 April 1940
- Stricken: 24 June 1949
- Fate: Destroyed in battle with Kriegsmarine units at Herøysund, Uskedal, 20 April 1940; Formally stricken and sold for scrapping 24 June 1949.

Service record
- Commanders: Lieutenant H. M. Hansen (1940)
- Operations: Norwegian Campaign
- Victories: 2 ships (11,862 tons) taken as prizes, 1 warship damaged

General characteristics
- Class & type: Trygg class
- Displacement: 256 tons
- Length: 53 m (173.88 ft)
- Beam: 5.5 m (18.04 ft)
- Draft: 1.58 m (5.18 ft)
- Propulsion: 3,600 hp steam engine
- Speed: 25 knots (46.30 km/h)
- Complement: 33 men
- Armament: 2 × 76 mm guns; 1 × 20 mm Oerlikon; anti-aircraft gun; 4 × 45 cm torpedo tubes

The last of the Trygg class of Royal Norwegian Navy torpedo boats was HNoMS Stegg. Her sister ships were Trygg and Snøgg. The Trygg class vessels were the only additions to the Norwegian fleet of torpedo boats between the First and the Second World Wars. At the outbreak of the Second World War the Trygg class was mobilised together with eight 2. class and six 1. class torpedo boats.

Stegg was constructed at Horten naval shipyard and had yard number 111. She was named after the Stegg, the Norwegian term for the male grouse.

== Second World War ==
=== Intercepting German merchants ===
The Stegg had a brief and intense period of service in the Norwegian Campaign after the German invasion of Norway. When the invasion began on 9 April 1940 she was anchored at Skudeneshavn and commanded by Lieutenant H. M. Hansen. She entered the Hardangerfjord on 10 April 1940 and proceeded to capture two German merchant ships; first the 5,295-ton Cläre Hugo Stinnes 1 on 12 April 1940 and then the 6,567-ton iron ore laden Afrika five days later. Together with the 1. class torpedo boat HNoMS Sæl, Stegg escorted Afrika to the port of Odda the same day she was captured. The German crews were held as POWs by Norwegian land forces.

Cläre Hugo Stinnes was used by the Norwegian forces from 14 April as the depot ship of the Hardangerfjord naval air group in Eidfjord. The two captured ships were later to become the centres of battles at Kinsarvik (Cläre Hugo Stinnes) and Ulvik (Afrika). Afrika, having been captured on her way from Narvik to Germany, ended up being scuttled by her Norwegian captors in the heat of battle at Ulvik, while Cläre Hugo Stinnes survived an unsuccessful Kriegsmarine attempted recapture at Kinsarvik and was eventually released with her crew on 2 May 1940 as Norwegian resistance in South Norway collapsed. On her way to Bergen Cläre Hugo Stinnes was attacked by the Royal Navy submarine Trident and damaged by gunfire.

=== Final battle ===
The end for Stegg came on 20 April 1940 as she was anchored at Herøysund. In the morning the 1,870-ton artillery training ship Bremse and the armed whaler Schiff 221 blocked Stegg in the fjord and attacked her. Early on in the engagement two 57 mm shells from Schiff 221 hit Stegg in the bow, set her ablaze and caused water to start flooding the torpedo boat. The heavier shells of Bremse meanwhile failed to find their target and the burning Stegg returned fire against Schiff 221, hitting the whaler twice with her 76 mm main gun. However, for Stegg the war was over, as the fire on board got out of control and her crew had to abandon ship. Soon the fire reached Stegg's torpedoes and ammunition hold and the ship went up in a large explosion. The entire bow of the ship disappeared and Stegg sank slowly to the bottom of the fjord. The crew got away without serious injuries, despite being bombarded by the two German warships as they fled inland.

== Bibliography ==
- Abelsen, Frank (1986). Norwegian naval ships 1939–1945 (in Norwegian and English). Oslo: Sem & Stenersen AS. ISBN 82-7046-050-8.
- Berg, Ole F. (1997). I skjærgården og på havet – Marinens krig 8. april 1940 – 8. mai 1945 (in Norwegian). Oslo: Marinens krigsveteranforening. ISBN 82-993545-2-8.
- Hegland, Jon Rustung; Johan Henrik Lilleheim (1998). Norske torpedobåter gjennom 125 år – MTB våpenets 125 års jubileumsbok 1873–1998 (in Norwegian). Hundvåg: Norsk Tidsskrift for Sjøvesen. ISBN 82-994738-1-0.
