= Uskedal Church =

Church in Vestland, Norway

- Uskedal kyrkje
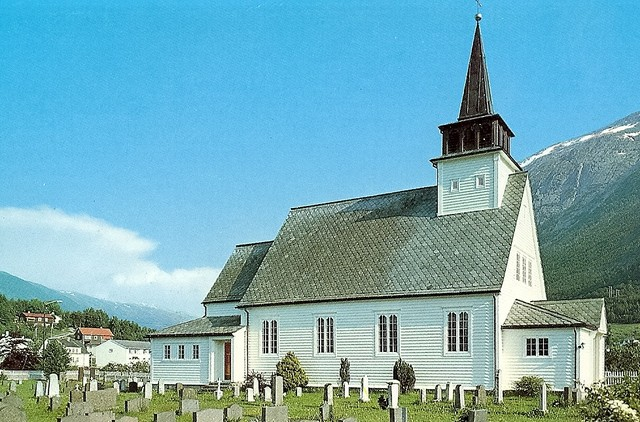
- View of the church
- Uskedal Church
- 59°55′53″N 5°51′29″E
- Location: Kvinnherad Municipality, Vestland
- Country: Norway
- Denomination: Church of Norway
- Churchmanship: Evangelical Lutheran

History
- Status: Parish church
- Founded: 1914
- Consecrated: 16 Dec 1914

Architecture
- Functional status: Active
- Architect(s): Olaf Nordhagen and Engel Sundfjord
- Architectural type: Long church
- Completed: 1914 (112 years ago)

Specifications
- Capacity: 226
- Materials: Wood

Administration
- Diocese: Bjørgvin bispedømme
- Deanery: Sunnhordland prosti
- Parish: Uskedal
- Norwegian Cultural Heritage Site
- Type: Church
- Status: Listed
- ID: 85730

Uskedal Church (Norwegian: Uskedal kyrkje) is a parish church of the Church of Norway in Kvinnherad Municipality in Vestland county, Norway. It is located in the village of Uskedalen. It is the church for the Uskedal parish which is part of the Sunnhordland prosti (deanery) in the Diocese of Bjørgvin. The white, wooden church was built in a long church design in 1914 using plans drawn up by the architects Olaf Nordhagen and Engel Sundfjord. The church seats about 226 people.

== History ==
A burial ground was built in Uskedal in 1896 and consecrated in February 1897. The idea of building a church in Uskedal was put forward at the same time by the people of the village, but the Church Ministry's consent was not given until 1913 when permission was given to build a chapel on a designated plot on the Myklebust farm using designs drawn up by Olaf Nordhagen. The new church building was consecrated on 16 December 1914. It stood in its original design until 1964 when a major renovation work was started according to plans prepared by architect Ole Halvorsen from Bergen. In this renovation, the chancel and sacristies were enlarged and reconfigured and the church porch was also enlarged and the tower was redesigned as well.

== Media gallery ==
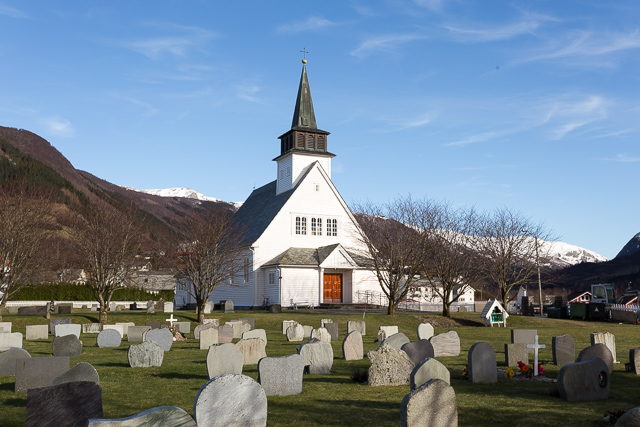

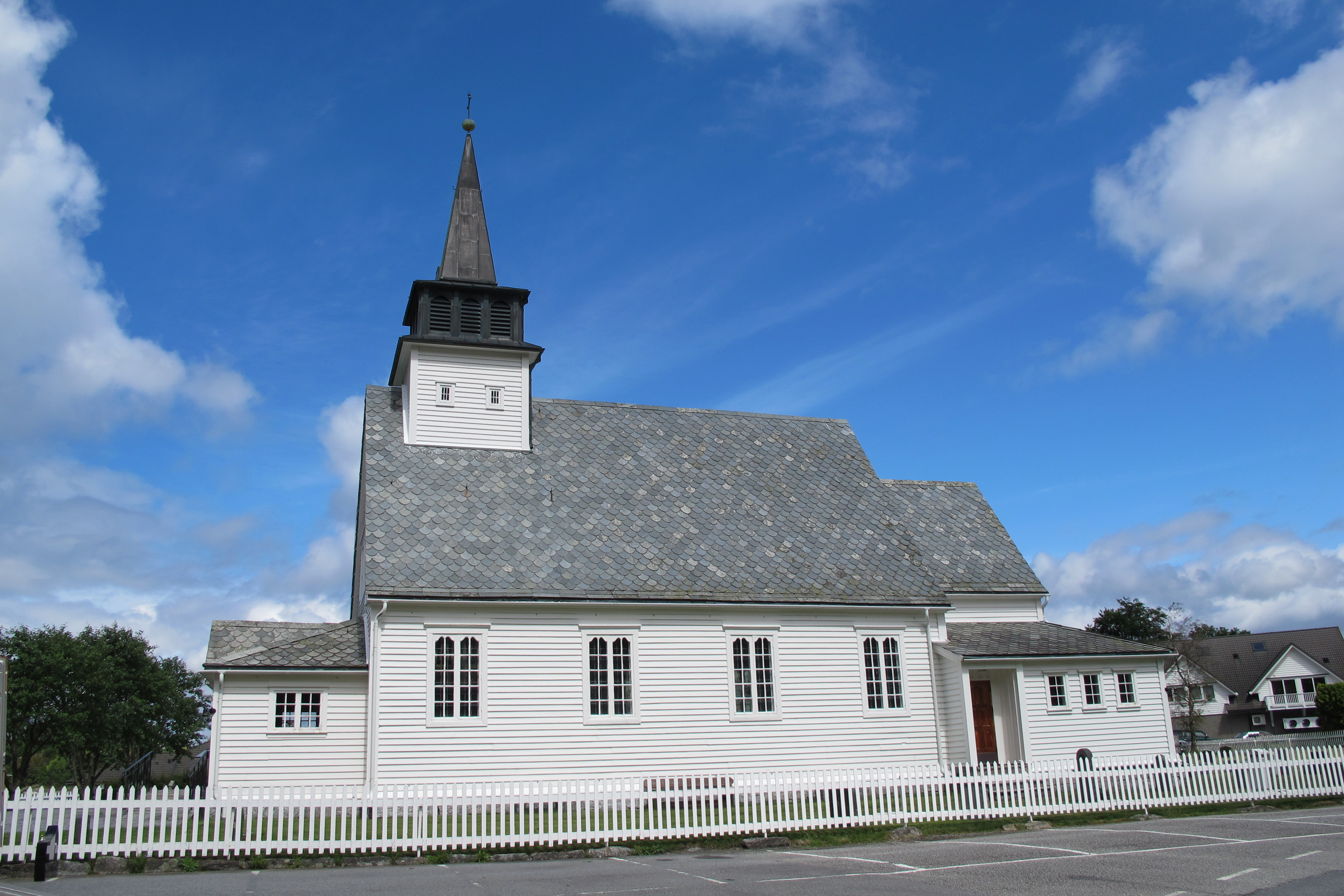

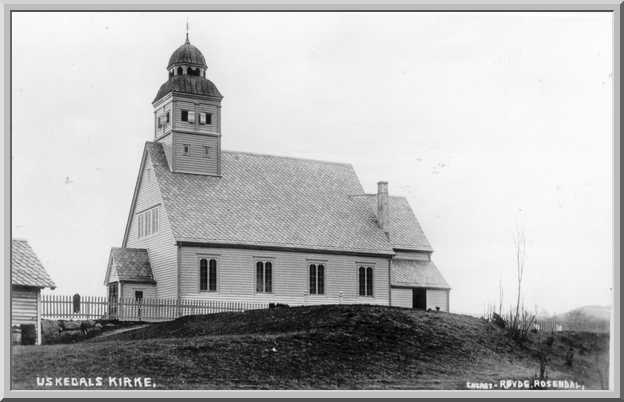
View of the church before the 1964 additions

== See also ==
- List of churches in Bjørgvin
