= German minesweeper Sperrbrecher 18 =

History
- Name: Schürbek (1930–40); Sperrbrecher 18 (1940–45); Schürbek (1945–59)
- Owner: Knöhr & Burchardt (1930–39); Kriegsmarine (1939–45); United Kingdom Government (1945–49)
- Port of registry: (Weimar Republic) Hamburg, Germany (1930–33); (Nazi Germany) Hamburg, Germany (1933–39); Kriegsmarine (1939–45); Hamburg, Allied-occupied Germany (1945–49)
- Builder: Flensburger Schiffbau-Gesellschaft
- Yard number: 418
- Launched: 10 April 1930
- Completed: 3 June 1930
- Out of service: 12 March 1945
- Identification: Code Letters RHPN (1930–34); Code Letters DHUU (1934–45); Pennant Number TS(K)2 (1939–40); Pennant Number TS(K)1 (1940); Schiff 40 (1939–40)
- Fate: Bombed, damaged beyond economic repair

General characteristics
- Class & type: Cargo ship (1930–39, 1945–49); Auxiliary cruiser (1939–40); Sperrbrecher (1940–45)
- Tonnage: 2,448 GRT, 1,435 NRT
- Length: 93.57 metres (307 ft 0 in)
- Beam: 13.84 metres (45 ft 5 in)
- Draught: 6.63 metres (21 ft 9 in)
- Depth: 5.97 metres (19 ft 7 in)
- Installed power: Compound steam engine, 272 nhp
- Propulsion: Screw propeller
- Speed: 11 knots (20 km/h)

Sperrbrecher 18 was a Kriegsmarine sperrbrecher that was built in 1930 as the cargo ship Schürbek by Flensburger Schiffbau-Gesellschaft, Flensburg for Knöhr & Burchardt, Hamburg. She was requisitioned by the Kriegsmarine during World War II and was designated Schiff 40 and later Sperrbrecher 18. Severely damaged in an Allied air raid on Hamburg in March 1945, she was declared a constructive total loss and scrapped in 1948–49.

== Description ==
The ship was 93.57 metres (307 ft 0 in) long, with a beam of 13.84 metres (45 ft 5 in). She had a depth of 5.97 metres (19 ft 7 in) and a draught of 6.63 metres (21 ft 9 in). She was assessed at 2,448 GRT, 1,435 NRT.

She was powered by a four-cylinder compound steam engine, which had two cylinders of 478 millimetres (18 13/16 in) diameter and two cylinders of 1,000 millimetres (39 3/8 in) diameter by 1,000 millimetres (39 3/8 in) stroke. The engine was built by A. Borsig GmbH., Berlin. It was rated at 272 nhp and drove a screw propeller. It could propel her at 11.5 knots (21.3 km/h).

When operated as a Sperrbrecher, the ship was armed with two 10.5 cm SK L/45 naval guns, six 3.7 cm anti-aircraft guns and four 2 cm anti-aircraft guns.

== History ==
Schürbek was built as yard number 418 by Flensburger Schiffbau-Gesellschaft, Flensburg for Knöhr & Burchardt, Hamburg. She was launched on 10 April 1930 and completed on 3 June. Her port of registry was Hamburg and the Code Letters RHPN were allocated. In 1934, her Code Letters were changed to DHUU. On 19 August 1939, Schürbek collided with the Portuguese steamship Corte Real at Rotterdam, Netherlands. Both vessels were damaged.

On 5 September 1939, she was requisitioned by the Kriegsmarine. Allocated the pennant number TS(K)2 and designated Schiff 40, she was allocated to 6 Vorpostengruppe on 23 December as a Q-ship. On 20 January 1940, her pennant number was changed to TS(K)1. Schürbek was placed under the control of the Führer der Sonderverband West. On 10 April 1940, Schürbek was attacked by the British submarine HMS Tarpon west of Jutland. Tarpon's torpedoes missed, and Schürbek and the minesweeper M18 delivered a sustained depth charge attack over several hours, which sank Tarpon. On 12 April 1940, Schürbek was torpedoed and damaged in the Skaggerak by the British submarine HMS Sunfish.

She was under repair from 10 September to 19 December, and was recommissioned as the auxiliary minesweeper Sperrbrecher 18, joining the 3rd Sperrbrecherflotille, operating off Norway and in the Baltic. On 12 March 1945, Sperrbrecher 18 was severely damaged in an American air raid on Hamburg and was declared a constructive total loss. Although allocated to the United Kingdom post-war, Lloyd's Register shows that she remained under the German flag under her original name. Schürbek was scrapped in 1948–49.
