= Herøysund =

Village in Kvinnherad Municipality, Norway

- Village
- Interactive map of Herøysund
- Coordinates: 59.91921°N 5.79186°E
- Country: Norway
- Region: Western Norway
- County: Vestland
- District: Sunnhordland
- Municipality: Kvinnherad Municipality

Area
  - Total: 0.54 km^{2} (0.21 sq mi)
- Elevation: 18 m (59 ft)

Population (2025)
  - Total: 569
  - Density: 1,054/km^{2} (2,730/sq mi)
- Time zone: UTC+01:00 (CET)
  - Summer (DST): UTC+02:00 (CEST)
- Post Code: 5462 Herøysundet

Herøysund is a village in Kvinnherad Municipality in Vestland county, Norway. The village is located on the southeastern shore of the Hardangerfjorden, about half-way between the villages of Husnes (to the south) and Uskedalen (to the north).

The 0.54-square-kilometre (130-acre) village has a population (2025) of 569 and a population density of 1,054 inhabitants per square kilometre (2,730/sq mi).
