= HMS Tarpon (N17) =

Submarine of the Royal Navy

Coordinates: 56.717°N 6.55°E

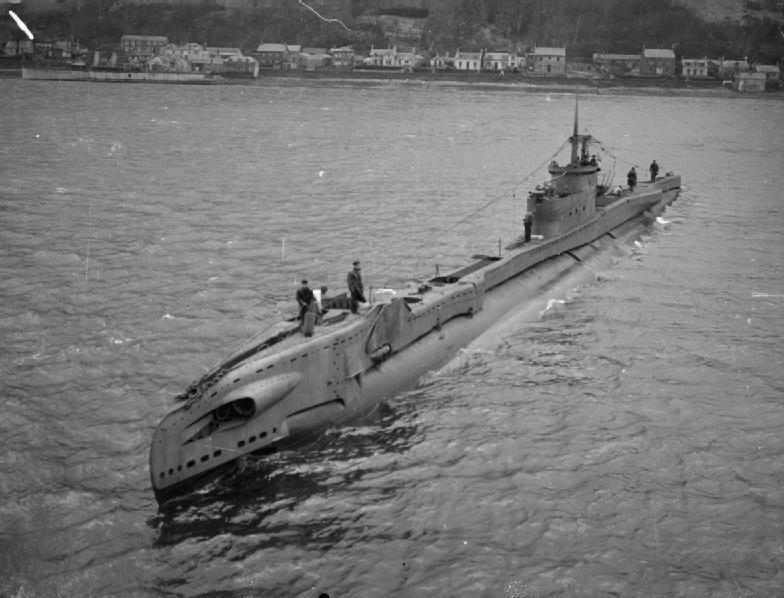
- The British T-class submarine HMS Tudor, sister ship of HMS Tarpon.

History

United Kingdom
- Builder: Scotts, Greenock
- Laid down: 5 October 1937
- Launched: 17 October 1939
- Commissioned: 8 March 1940
- Identification: Pennant number N17
- Fate: Sunk with all hands, 14 April 1940
- Badge

General characteristics
- Class & type: British T class submarine
- Displacement: 1,090 tons surfaced; 1,575 tons submerged
- Length: 275 ft (84 m)
- Beam: 26 ft 6 in (8.08 m)
- Draught: 16.3 ft (5.0 m)
- Propulsion: Two shafts; Twin diesel engines 2,500 hp (1.86 MW) each; Twin electric motors 1,450 hp (1.08 MW) each
- Speed: 15.25 knots (28.7 km/h) surfaced; 9 knots (20 km/h) submerged
- Range: 4,500 nautical miles at 11 knots (8,330 km at 20 km/h) surfaced
- Test depth: 300 ft (91 m) max
- Complement: 59
- Armament: 6 internal forward-facing 21-inch (533 mm) torpedo tubes; 4 external forward-facing torpedo tubes; 6 reload torpedoes; 1 x 4-inch (102 mm) deck gun

The second HMS Tarpon (N17) was a T-class submarine of the Royal Navy. She was laid down by Scotts, Greenock and launched in October 1939. She is named after the large fish Tarpon; one species of which is native to the Atlantic, and the other to the Indo-Pacific Oceans.

== Career ==
Tarpon had a short career, serving in the North Sea. She left Portsmouth on 5 April 1940 for Rosyth in company with HMS Severn. The following day they were ordered to Norway. On the 10th Tarpon was ordered to take up a new position. Tarpon was never heard from again.

It is asserted that there is a combination of British and German records which state that she was engaged by Schiff 40. The records show that Tarpon had attacked the Q-ship Schiff 40/Schürbek, but her first torpedoes had missed. The Q-ship picked up the Tarpon on her sonar and her periscope was sighted. The ship dropped numerous depth charges in a sustained counterattack that went on most of the morning. Finally a pattern of depth charges brought wreckage to the surface. The Q-ship remained on the scene until 0500 the next morning when it became clear the submarine had been sunk. Tarpon was reported overdue on 22 April 1940.

== Wreck ==
The wreck was found and identified in the Danish part of the North Sea, near the harbour town of Thyborøn, by a Danish commercial diver, Gert Normann Andersen, of the company JD-Contractor, and British marine archaeologist Dr Innes McCartney in March 2016. The wreck was explored in a live TV program by Denmark's Radio on 28 August 2016. The submarine wreck was found with two torpedo tubes empty; confirming it likely they were fired in battle before her sinking. It is therefore still most likely she was then sunk by depth charges. The wreck is submerged in 40 metres of water.
