= German minesweeper M18 (1939) =

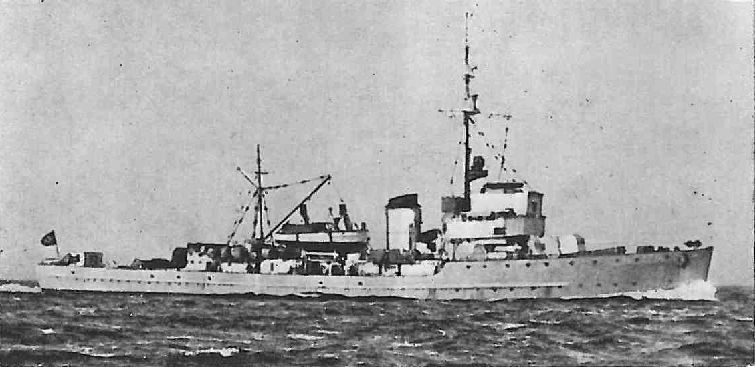
- Sister ship M1

History

Nazi Germany
- Name: M18
- Builder: Oderwerke, Stettin
- Launched: 16 September 1939
- Commissioned: 19 March 1940
- Fate: Sunk 20 March 1945

General characteristics
- Class & type: M 1935-class minesweeper
- Displacement: 874 long tons (888 t) full load
- Length: 68.40 m (224 ft 5 in) o/a
- Beam: 8.50 m (27 ft 11 in)
- Draught: 2.65 m (8 ft 8 in)
- Propulsion: 2 shaft reciprocating steam engines, 2 oil-fired boilers, 3,500 ihp (2,610 kW)
- Speed: 18.3 knots (33.9 km/h; 21.1 mph)
- Range: 5,000 nmi (9,300 km; 5,800 mi) at 10 knots (19 km/h; 12 mph)
- Complement: 95
- Armament: 2 × 10.5 cm (4.1 in) SK L/45 guns; 2 × 3.7 cm (1.5 in) AA guns; 2 × 2 cm (0.79 in) AA guns; 30 naval mines

The German minesweeper M18 was a M1935 type minesweeper of the Nazi German Kriegsmarine. Built under the 1937 construction programme by Oderwerke, Stettin, M18 was launched in 1939 and entered service in 1940. She was sunk in an air raid on Kiel on 20 March 1945.

== Design and construction ==
The M1935 type minesweeper was a development of Germany's successful minesweepers of the First World War, but with a longer hull and using oil fuel rather than coal. A first order for twelve ships (M1–M12) was placed in 1935, as part of the first shipbuilding programme for the German Navy since the Anglo-German Naval Agreement signalled an expansion of the German Navy past the constrictions of the Treaty of Versailles. Six more minesweepers of the same design (M13–M18) were ordered as part of the 1937 construction programme.

M18 was 68.40 m (224 ft 5 in) long overall and 66.60 m (218 ft 6 in) at the waterline, with a beam of 8.50 m (27 ft 11 in) and a draught of 2.65 m (8 ft 8 in). Displacement was 772 long tons (784 t) standard and 874 long tons (888 t) full load. Two Wagner oil-fired water-tube boilers fed steam to reciprocating steam engines, (Note: Lenton describes the engines as Vertical Triple-expansion engines while Gardiner and Gray and Gröner refer to the engines as Lenz single-ended engines.) rated at 3,500 ihp (2,600 kW) which drove two propeller shafts, giving a speed of 18.3 kn (21.1 mph; 33.9 km/h). 143 tons of oil were carried giving a range of 5,000 nmi (5,800 mi; 9,300 km) at 10 kn (12 mph; 19 km/h) and 1,000 nmi (1,200 mi; 1,900 km) at 17 kn (20 mph; 31 km/h).

As built, M18 had a main gun armament of two 10.5 cm (4.1 in) SK C/32 naval guns, (Note: SK stood for Schnellfeuerkanone (quick-firing gun).) two 3.7 cm SK C/30 and two 2 cm Flak 30 anti-aircraft guns. 30 mines could be carried. The ship's anti-aircraft armament was increased during the Second World War, with several (4–6) more 2 cm cannon added. The ship had a complement of 95–113 men.

M18 was laid down as Yard number 804 at the Oderwerke shipyard in Stettin (now Szczecin in Poland. She was launched on 16 September 1939 and entered service on 19 March 1940.

== Service ==
M18 served with the 1st and 3rd Minesweeper Flotillas. On the night of 7/8 July 1942, Soviet forces launched an amphibious attack with light forces against the Finnish island of Someri. M18, together with several other German and Finnish ships, provided artillery support to a Finnish counter-attack, and helped to prevent Soviet naval forces from interfering. The Soviet force was defeated on 9 July.

On 4 November 1943, Soviet ground attack aircraft attacked German minesweepers in the Gulf of Finland, slightly damaging M18 and the minesweepers M30, M459 and M460 and badly damaging the minesweeper M16.

On 3 February 1944, M18 and sister ship M29 were badly damaged in an American air raid on Wilhelmshaven. When repaired, she returned to service with the 3rd Minesweeper Flotilla, and on 22 June supported (together with the rest of her flotilla (M15, M19, M22 and M30) and the 2nd Torpedoboat Flotilla (T8, T10 and T30)) an unsuccessful attempt to land Finnish forces on the island of Narvi. By late September 1944, the advance of the Soviet armies into Estonia prompted an evacuation of German troops and refugees from Tallinn, with the last convoy leaving on 23 September. M18 helped to lay minefields to protect this evacuation and block routes out of the Gulf of Finland. Minelaying operations to cover the German retreat continued, with M18 taking part in Operation Krokodil Süd, to mine the southern exits to Moon Sound on 4–6 October.

== Loss ==
On 20 March 1945, M18, along with sister ships M15, M16, M19 and the old minesweeper M522, was sunk in an air raid at Kiel and later scrapped.

== Bibliography ==
- Gardiner, Robert; Chesneau, Roger, eds. (1980). Conway's All The World's Fighting Ships 1922–1946. London: Conway Maritime Press. ISBN 0-85177-146-7.
- Gröner, Erich; Jung, Dieter; Maass, Martin (1983). Die deutschen Kriegsschiffe 1815–1945: Band 2: Torpedoboote, Zerstörer, Schnellboote, Minensuchboote, Minenräumboote (in German). Koblenz: Bernard & Graef Verlag. ISBN 3-7637-4801-6.
- Lenton, H. T. (1975). German Warships of the Second World War. London: Macdonald and Jane's. ISBN 0-356-04661-3.
- Rohwer, Jürgen; Hümmelchen, Gerhard (1992). Chronology of the War At Sea 1939–1945. London: Greenhill Books. ISBN 1-85367-117-7.
