= HMS Triton (N15) =

Submarine of the Royal Navy, in service from 1938 to 1940

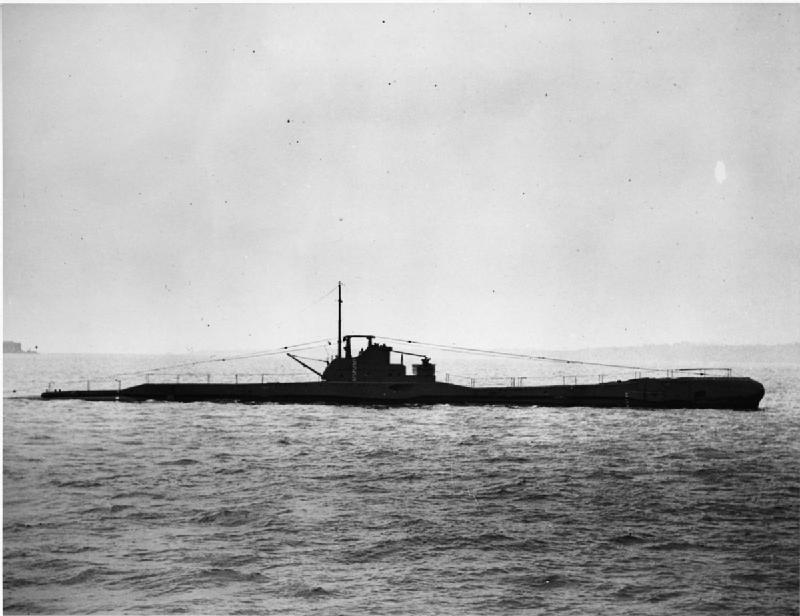
- HMS Triton

History

United Kingdom
- Name: HMS Triton
- Builder: Vickers-Armstrongs, Barrow-in-Furness
- Laid down: 28 August 1936
- Launched: 5 October 1937
- Commissioned: 9 November 1938
- Identification: Pennant number: N15
- Fate: Sunk 18 December 1940
- Badge

General characteristics
- Class & type: T-class submarine
- Displacement: 1,090 tons surfaced; 1,575 tons submerged
- Length: 275 ft (84 m)
- Beam: 26 ft 6 in (8.08 m)
- Draught: 16.3 ft (5.0 m)
- Propulsion: Two shafts; Twin diesel engines 2,500 hp (1.86 MW) each; Twin electric motors 1,450 hp (1.08 MW) each
- Speed: 15.25 knots (28.7 km/h) surfaced; 9 knots (20 km/h) submerged
- Range: 4,500 nautical miles at 11 knots (8,330 km at 20 km/h) surfaced
- Test depth: 300 ft (91 m) max
- Complement: 59
- Armament: 6 internal forward-facing 21-inch (533 mm) torpedo tubes; 4 external forward-facing torpedo tubes; 6 reload torpedoes; 1 x 4-inch (102 mm) deck gun

HMS Triton was a submarine of the Royal Navy named for the son of Poseidon and Amphitrite, the personification of the roaring waters. She was the lead ship of the T class (or Triton class) of diesel-electric submarines. Her keel was laid down on 28 August 1936 by Vickers-Armstrongs at Barrow-in-Furness. She was launched on 5 October 1937, and commissioned on 9 November 1938.

== Career ==
At the onset of the Second World War, Triton was a member of the 2nd Submarine Flotilla. From 26–29 August 1939, the flotilla deployed to its war bases at Dundee and Blyth.

=== The sinking of HMS Oxley ===
When the Admiralty was notified that the United Kingdom would declare war on Germany, five submarines of the 2nd Submarine Flotilla, including HMS Triton and HMS Oxley, were ordered to patrol on the Obrestad line off Norway on 24 August 1939. Thus, on 3 September all British submarines were in their combat patrol sectors.

At 1955 on 10 September 1939, Triton had surfaced, fixed a position off the Obrestad Light, set a slow zigzag patrol, and began charging batteries. Lieutenant Commander Steel, having verified that the area was clear and having posted lookouts, gave the bridge to the officer of the watch and went below, leaving orders that he was to be called if anything unusual appeared. At 2045, he was called to the bridge when an object in the water could be seen very fine on the port bow.

Steel ordered propulsion shifted to the main motors, the signalman to the bridge, and torpedo tubes 7 and 8 readied for firing. The object was recognised as a submarine low in the water.

Once on the bridge, the signalman sent three challenges over several minutes with the box lamp, none of which were answered. Steel wondered if the boat could be HMS Oxley, which should have been patrolling next in line, but some distance away. Steel and his bridge crew studied the silhouette, but could not distinguish what type of submarine it was.

A fourth challenge was sent: three green rifle-grenade flares. After firing, Steel counted slowly to 15 and then decided that they were seeing a German U-boat. He ordered tubes 7 and 8 fired with a three-second interval. Less than a minute later, an explosion was heard.

Triton moved into the area to investigate and heard cries for help. The light from the Aldis lamp revealed three men floundering amid oil and debris.

Lieutenant Guy C. I. St.B. Watkins and Lieutenant Harry A. Stacey entered the water and rescued Lieutenant Commander H.G. Bowerman, Oxley's commanding officer, as well as Able Seaman Gluckes, a lookout. The third person in the water, Lieutenant F.K. Manley, was seen to be swimming strongly when he suddenly sank from view. Neither Manley's body nor any other survivors from Oxley were found.

A Board of Enquiry found that Steel had done all he reasonably could in the circumstances. Oxley was out of position, Triton had acted correctly, and the first Allied submarine casualty of World War II was due to "friendly fire." During the war, the loss of Oxley was attributed to an accidental explosion. After the war, it was explained to have been a collision with Triton. The truth was not revealed until the 1950s.

=== Home waters and the Mediterranean ===
Triton continued her war patrols, first in Baltic waters. On 8 April, in the lead-up to the German invasion of Norway, she fired ten torpedoes at the German cruisers Blücher, Lützow and Emden off Skagen. All torpedoes missed their targets. On 10 April 1940, she sank the German steamers Friedenau, Wigbert, and the patrol vessel Rau 6 in the Kattegat.

Later, she was redeployed to the Mediterranean Sea, based in Alexandria. During her first patrol in the Gulf of Genoa, Lieutenant Watkins, now Triton's commanding officer, decided to enter the harbour of Savona. She found a supply ship at anchor in the harbour, at which she fired a single torpedo and claimed an 8,000-ton kill, though the sinking could not be confirmed. No other ships were available to torpedo, so Watkins surfaced Triton. The submarine began shelling a large factory and a gas works on the shore, damaging both of them before departing. According to Italian sources, Triton's target was not a merchant ship; the submarine apparently mistook the chimney of the pump station for the funnel of a merchant ship, and fired the torpedoes against the shore. The Cieli Electric Station sustained slight damage from the gunfire.

== Sinking ==
On 28 November 1940, Triton left Malta for a patrol in the southern Adriatic Sea. On 6 December, the Italian merchant Olimpia was torpedoed by a British submarine in the area. Her distress message was picked up by the Royal Navy, which assumed that the attack had been carried out by Triton. The submarine was never heard from again, and was declared lost with all hands on 18 December. Olimpia was successfully towed to port by Italian escort units. The Italian Navy claimed that Triton was sunk by torpedo boats, probably Confienza, possibly by Clio, but the date cited was several days after contact was lost. British sources claimed that Triton was sunk by naval mines in the Strait of Otranto.
