= HNoMS Trygg (1919) =

Norwegian torpedo boat

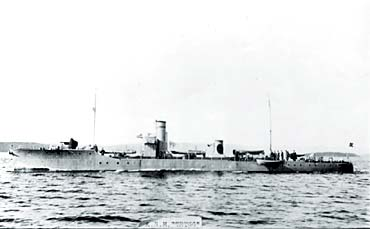
- Trygg at sea in the prewar years

History

Norway
- Name: Trygg
- Builder: Moss Verft shipyard in Moss (hull); and the Royal Norwegian Navy's Karljohansvern Yard in Horten
- Yard number: 109
- Laid down: 1917
- Launched: 31 May 1919
- Fate: Sunk by German bombers 25 April 1940

Service record
- Commanders: Lieutenant Frantz W. Munster; (? – 25 April 1940)
- Operations: Norwegian Campaign
- Victories: 2 ships (1,500 tons) captured

Nazi Germany
- Name: Zick
- Acquired: Refloated in 1940
- Fate: Sunk by RAF de Havilland Mosquitos near Bergen, Norway 23 October 1944.

Service record
- Operations: Occupation of Norway by Nazi Germany

General characteristics as built
- Class & type: Trygg class
- Displacement: 256 tons
- Length: 53 m (173.88 ft)
- Beam: 5.5 m (18.04 ft)
- Draft: 1.58 m (5.18 ft)
- Propulsion: 3,600 hp steam engine
- Speed: 25 knots (46.30 km/h)
- Complement: 33 men
- Armament: 2 × 76 mm guns; 1 × 20 mm Oerlikon; anti-aircraft gun; 4 × 45 cm torpedo tubes

General characteristics in German service
- Class & type: Trygg class
- Displacement: 256 tons
- Length: 53 m (173.88 ft)
- Beam: 5.5 m (18.04 ft)
- Draft: 1.58 m (5.18 ft)
- Propulsion: 3,600 hp steam engine
- Speed: 25 knots (46.30 km/h)
- Complement: 33 men
- Armament: 1 × 76 mm gun; 2 × 20 mm guns; 2 × machine guns; 2 × torpedo tubes

HNoMS Trygg (trygg is Norwegian for safe, secure, dependable) was a torpedo boat of the Royal Norwegian Navy. Her hull was built in Moss and she was finished in Horten, with build number 109. Trygg had two sister ships: HNoMS Snøgg and HNoMS Stegg. Together the three vessels formed the Trygg class of torpedo boats.

== Neutrality protection ==
At the outbreak of the Second World War, Trygg and other Norwegian warships were deployed along the Norwegian coastline to guard against neutrality violations by the warring parties. In one incident, the British submarine Triad suffered technical difficulties off the Norwegian coast, and was forced to enter Norwegian territorial waters near Bergen on 1 December 1939. After the submarine had been allowed to carry out rudimentary emergency repairs, Trygg escorted her out of Norwegian waters the next day.

== Norwegian Campaign service ==
During the Norwegian Campaign Trygg was commanded by Lieutenant Frantz W. Munster and served in an air defence and escort role against the invading Germans outside Molde and Åndalsnes in April 1940 (Åndalsnes landings). After surviving numerous air attacks the ship was finally sunk at Åndalsnes 25 April 1940.

As the torpedo boat was anchored up in the harbour the Luftwaffe bombers first attacked and knocked out British AA positions ashore before turning their attention towards the small Norwegian warship. A total of sixteen bombs were dropped against Trygg, one hitting the stern of the ship and passing through without exploding. The damage the bomb caused on its way through Trygg was however too much for her to stay afloat. Although Munster beached his ship before the stern went under, the ship settled on her side and sank in shallow waters the next day.

== German service as the Zick ==
The ship was salvaged by the Germans, renamed Zick, later renamed again to V.5506 Zick, and served as a Vorpostenboot on the coast of Norway until she was sunk by 21 de Havilland Mosquitos from 235 and 248 Squadrons RAF on 23 October 1944. She was escorting a three-ship convoy in Hjeltefjord near Bergen when the convoy came under attack by the rocket and autocannon firing Mosquitos.

All three cargo ships in the convoy suffered damage while Zick was blown apart, taking three Germans down with her. Before she was sunk Zick managed to slightly damage two of the attacking aircraft with her anti-aircraft armament.

== Bibliography ==
- Abelsen, Frank (1986). Norwegian naval ships 1939-1945 (in Norwegian and English). Oslo: Sem & Stenersen AS. ISBN 82-7046-050-8.
- Berg, Ole F. (1997). I skjærgården og på havet - Marinens krig 8. april 1940 - 8. mai 1945 (in Norwegian). Oslo: Marinens krigsveteranforening. ISBN 82-993545-2-8.
- Hafsten, Bjørn; Ulf Larsstuvold; Bjørn Olsen; Sten Stenersen (1991). Flyalarm - luftkrigen over Norge 1939-1945 (in Norwegian) (1st ed.). Oslo: Sem og Stenersen AS. ISBN 82-7046-058-3.
- Sivertsen, Svein Carl, ed. (1999). Jageren Sleipner i Romsdalsfjord sjøforsvarsdistrikt april 1940 (in Norwegian). Hundvåg: Sjømilitære Samfund ved Norsk Tidsskrift for Sjøvesen. ISBN 82-994738-3-7.
- Sivertsen, Svein Carl, ed. (2001). Sjøforsvaret dag for dag 1814-2000 (in Norwegian). Hundvåg: Sjømilitære Samfund ved Norsk Tidsskrift for Sjøvesen. ISBN 82-92217-03-7.
