= SS Friedenau =

History
- Owner: Bugsier-Reederei
- Builder: Ateliers & Chantiers De La Loire
- Completed: November 1920
- Fate: Torpedoed and sunk 10 April 1940

General characteristics
- Tonnage: 5219 grt
- Length: 119.4m
- Beam: 17m
- Installed power: 340 n.h.p.
- Propulsion: Triple expansion
- Speed: 10 kts
- Notes: Approximate location of wreck: 57°27'0" N 10°46'0" E

SS Friedenau was a German cargo steamer sunk during World War II.

SS Friedenau was built in 1920 by Ateliers & Chantiers De La Loire, St. Nazaire as a refrigerated cargo steamer for Cie. Française De Navigation À Vapeur Chargeurs Réunis who named her SS Adrar. In 1937 she was acquired by Bugsier-Reederei and renamed Friedenau. While carrying German mountain troops in support of the German invasion of Norway, SS Friedenau was torpedoed and sunk in the Kattegat by the British submarine HMS Triton on 10 April 1940.
