= HMS Trident (N52) =

Submarine of the Royal Navy

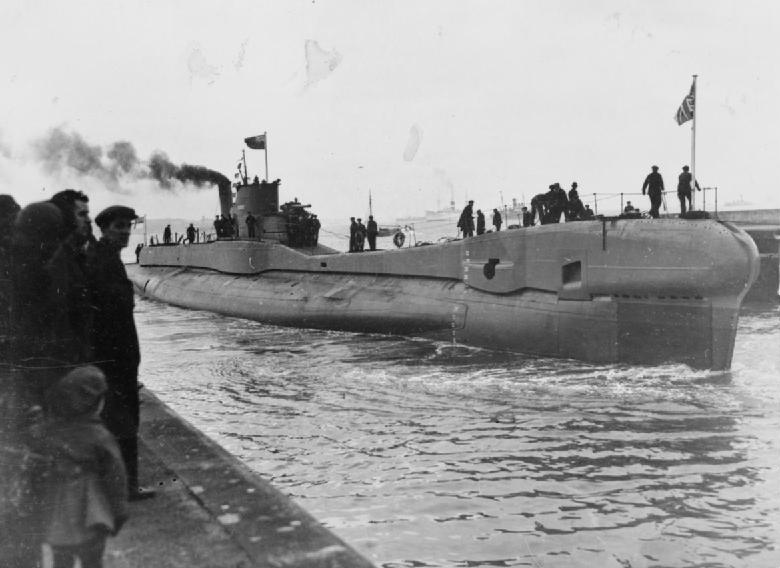
- HMS Trident

History

United Kingdom
- Name: HMS Trident
- Builder: Cammell Laird & Co Limited, Birkenhead
- Laid down: 12 January 1937
- Launched: 7 December 1938
- Commissioned: 1 October 1939
- Identification: Pennant number N52
- Fate: Sold to be broken up for scrap 17 February 1946
- Badge

General characteristics
- Class & type: British T class submarine
- Displacement: 1,090 tons surfaced; 1,575 tons submerged
- Length: 275 ft (84 m)
- Beam: 26 ft 6 in (8.08 m)
- Draught: 12 ft 9 in (3.89 m) forward; 14 ft 7 in (4.45 m) aft
- Propulsion: Two shafts; Twin diesel engines 2,500 hp (1.86 MW) each; Twin electric motors 1,450 hp (1.08 MW) each
- Speed: 15.25 knots (28.7 km/h) surfaced; 9 knots (20 km/h) submerged
- Range: 4,500 nautical miles at 11 knots (8,330 km at 20 km/h) surfaced
- Test depth: 300 ft (91 m) max
- Complement: 59
- Armament: 6 internal forward-facing 21-inch (533 mm) torpedo tubes; 4 external forward-facing torpedo tubes; 6 reload torpedoes; 1 x 4-inch (102 mm) deck gun

HMS Trident was a British T class submarine built by Cammell Laird, Birkenhead. She was laid down on 12 January 1937 and was commissioned on 1 October 1939. HMS Trident was part of the first group of T class submarines.

== Career ==
Trident operated in most of the naval theatres of the Second World War, in home waters in the North Sea and off the Scandinavian coast, in the Mediterranean and in the Pacific far east.

=== Home waters ===
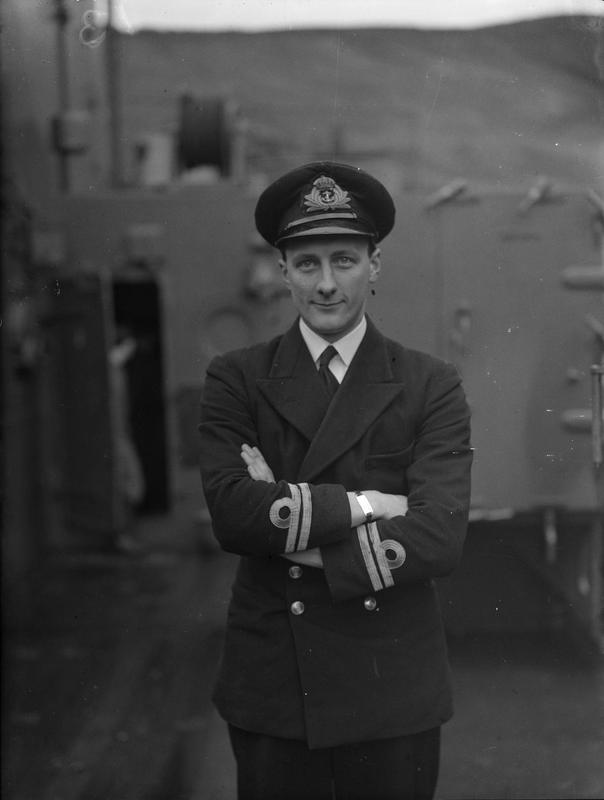
Lt P E Newstead RN, Commanding Officer of HMS Trident, Holy Loch, 6 February 1943 (IWM A14398)

In May 1940, Trident in Kors fjord Norway, destroyed a German supply ship with a torpedo, having forced it aground in an initial gun action. She spent the period from 1941 to mid 1943 in the North Sea, where she sank the German merchants Edmund Hugo Stinnes 4, Ostpreußen, Donau II, Hödur and Bahia Laura, the German tanker Stedingen and the German auxiliary submarine chaser UJ 1213 / Rau IV. She also attacked and damaged the German merchants Cläre Hugo Stinnes and Levante, and unsuccessfully attacked the German merchants Palime, Wandsbek, Pelikan and Altkirch, the German oiler Dithmarschen, the German hospital ship Birka, the German minesweeper depot ship MRS 3 / Bali and the German submarine U-31. Whilst returning to base at Polyarnoe, Russia, Trident was fired upon but missed by the German submarine U-566.

Perhaps her most important targets were the German cruiser Prinz Eugen and Admiral Scheer, which she sighted off Norway on 23 February 1942. Trident fired seven torpedoes against them, one of which hit Prinz Eugen in the stern and jammed her rudder and damaged her engines, but the Admiral Scheer escaped unscathed.

During much of this time the submarine had a young reindeer doe on board. It had been presented as an unexpected gift by the Russians in August 1941 as part of the diplomatic ceremonies to honour the alliance between Russia and Britain. The Reindeer was named Pollyanna after the base and apparently adapted so well to life on board (being fed table scraps and condensed milk) to the point that she ate a few navigations maps. When the submarine returned to the UK Pollyanna had grown to the extent that the services of the local slaughterman had to be used to truss her securely so she could be safely removed from the boat. Pollyanna then proceeded to live out the rest of her days in the local zoo, bobbing her head three times whenever she heard a whistle, as was her military training.

=== Mediterranean ===
In 1943, Trident was assigned to operate in the Mediterranean. She sank five sailing vessels and damaged the Italian merchant Vesta and the German patrol vessel GA 41 / Tassia Christa, and attacked the German auxiliary submarine chaser UJ 2202. She was unlucky on numerous occasions, however, her torpedoes missing two submarines, the Italian merchant Agnani and the French passenger/cargo ship Cap Corse.

She did not spend long in the Mediterranean before being reassigned to the Pacific far east, arriving there in mid 1943.

=== Far East ===
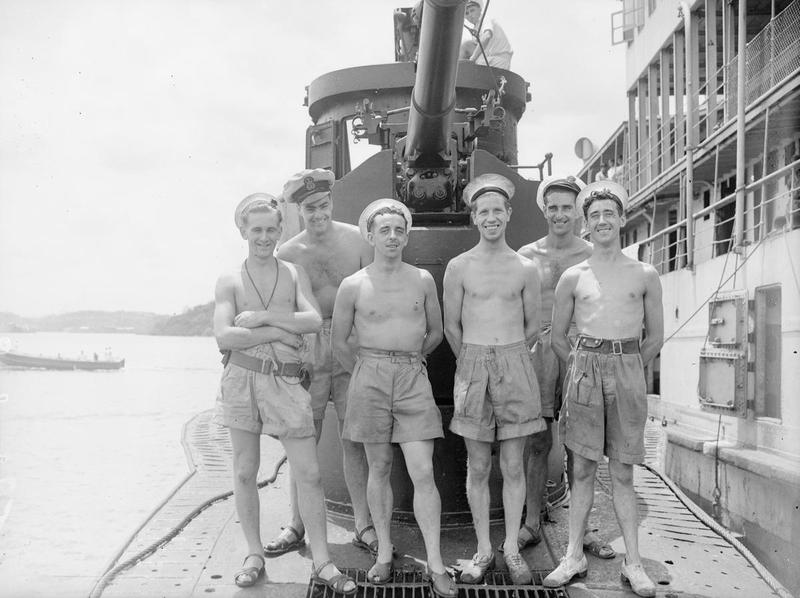
Crew of Trident in late July 1945, towards the end of the war.

She spent the last part of her wartime career in operations against the Japanese, sinking a Japanese sailing vessel and landing craft and unsuccessfully attacking the Japanese training cruiser Kashii. The landing craft was attacked and sunk by her 4-inch (100 mm) deck gun on 19 June 1945 off the Batu islands, Indonesia.

== Post war ==
HMS Trident survived the war, and was sold for scrap on 17 February 1946, and was broken up by Cashmore, of Newport.

== Publications ==
- Colledge, J. J.; Warlow, Ben (2006) [1969]. Ships of the Royal Navy: The Complete Record of All Fighting Ships of the Royal Navy from the 15th Century to the Present (3rd Rev ed.). London: Chatham Publishing. ISBN 978-1-86176-281-8. OCLC 67375475.
- Hutchinson, Robert (2001). Jane's Submarines: War Beneath the Waves from 1776 to the Present Day. London: HarperCollins. ISBN 978-0-00-710558-8. OCLC 53783010.
