= Uskedalen =

Village in Kvinnherad Municipality, Norway

Uskedal Uskedalen
- Village
- Interactive map of Uskedal
- Coordinates: 59.933°N 5.86339°E
- Country: Norway
- Region: Western Norway
- County: Vestland
- District: Sunnhordland
- Municipality: Kvinnherad Municipality

Area
  - Total: 0.77 km^{2} (0.30 sq mi)
- Elevation: 8 m (26 ft)

Population (2025)
  - Total: 730
  - Density: 948/km^{2} (2,460/sq mi)
- Time zone: UTC+01:00 (CET)
  - Summer (DST): UTC+02:00 (CEST)
- Post Code: 5463 Uskedalen

Uskedalen is a village in Kvinnherad Municipality in Vestland county, Norway. The village is located in a small valley along the southern shore of the Hardangerfjorden, about 7 kilometres (4.3 mi) southwest of the village of Dimmelsvik and about 4 kilometres (2.5 mi) east of the village of Herøysund. The village is the site of Uskedal Church.

The 0.77-square-kilometre (190-acre) village has a population (2025) of 730 and a population density of 948 inhabitants per square kilometre (2,460/sq mi).

== Media gallery ==
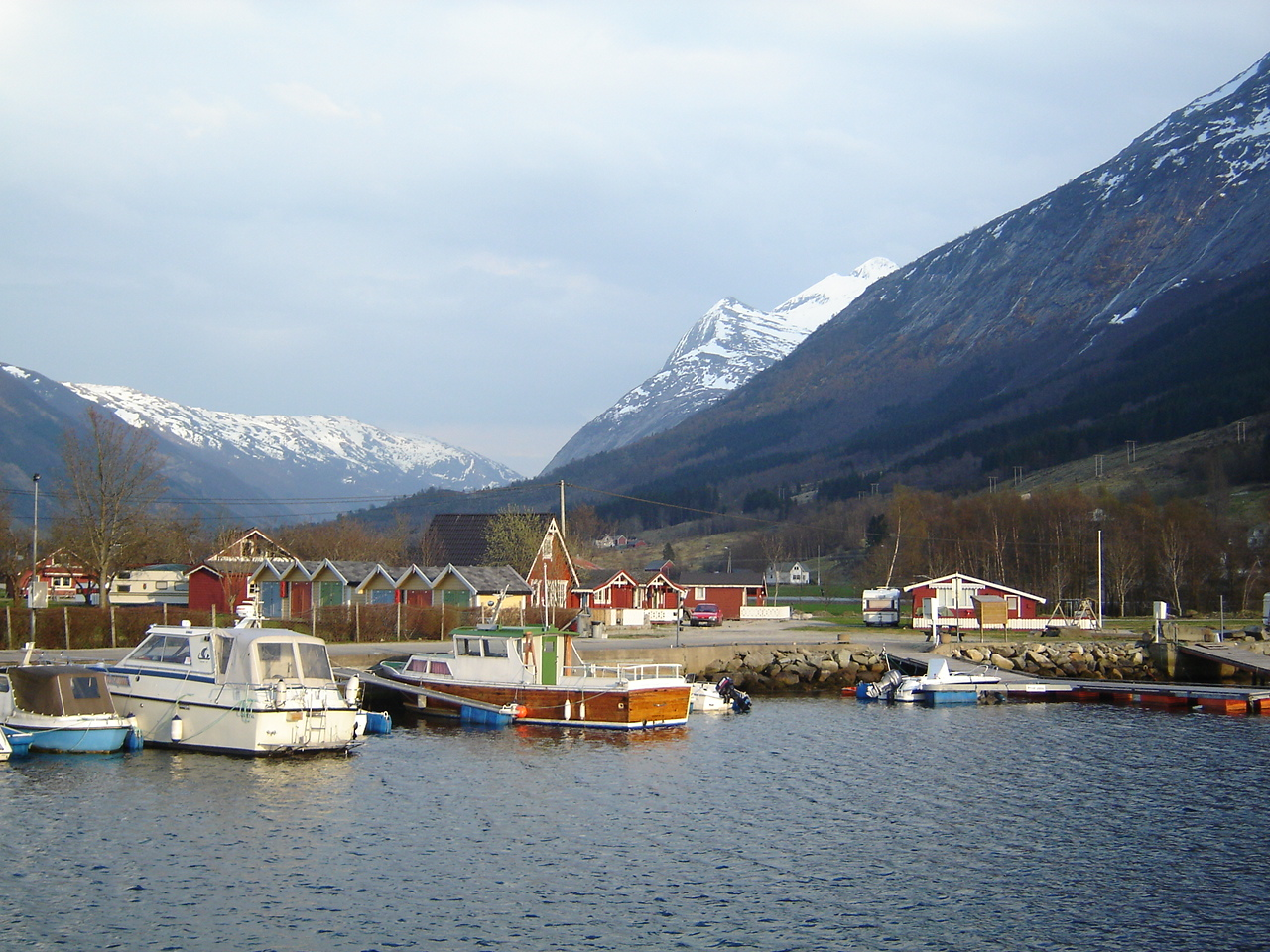
View of the harbour

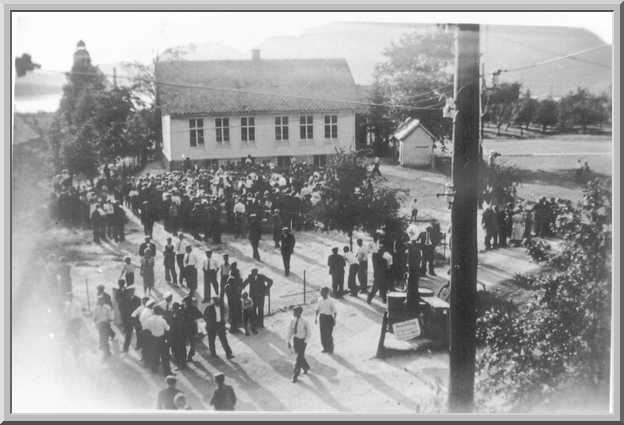
1915 Exhibition in Uskedal

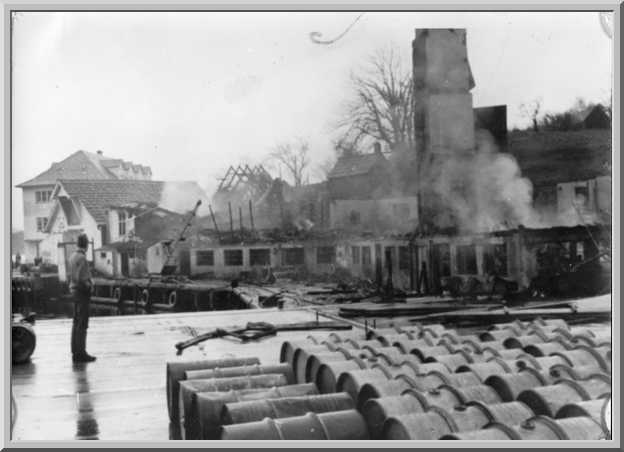
Burning of the cannery

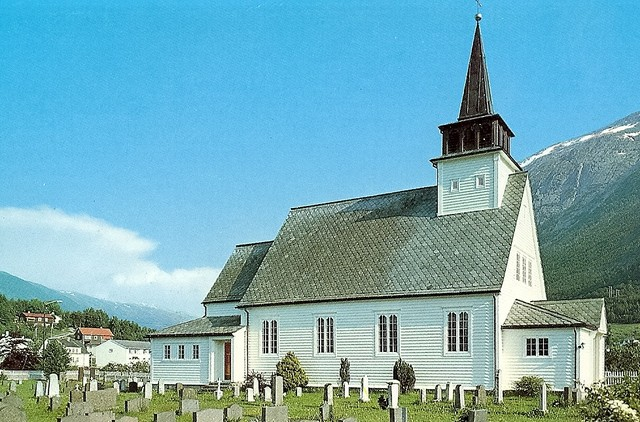
Uskedal Church
