= Trygg-class torpedo boat =

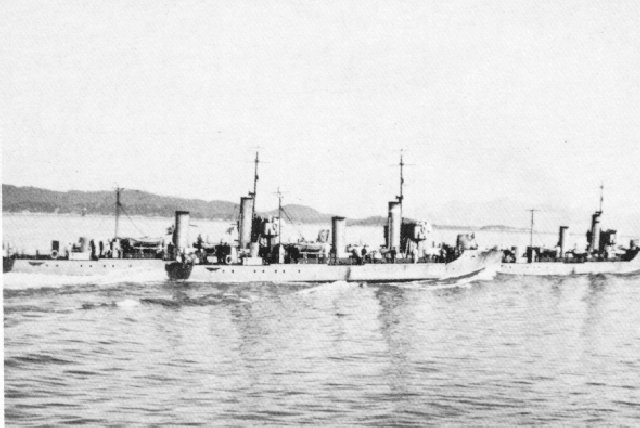
- All three Trygg class torpedo boats at some point before the Second World War.

Class overview
- Builders: Moss Verft in Moss (Trygg); and Horten naval yard (Snøgg and Stegg)
- Operators: Royal Norwegian Navy
- Preceded by: 2. class torpedo boat
- Succeeded by: No further torpedo boat classes in the Royal Norwegian Navy
- In service: 31 May 1919 – 24 June 1949
- In commission: 31 May 1919
- Completed: Trygg, Snøgg and Stegg
- Active: 3
- Lost: 3

General characteristics
- Displacement: 256 tons
- Length: 53.00 m (173.88 ft)
- Beam: 5.50 m (18.04 ft)
- Draught: 1.58 m (5.18 ft)
- Propulsion: 3,600 shp oil fuelled steam turbine
- Speed: 25 knots (46 km/h)
- Complement: 33 (? officers and ? ratings)
- Armament: As built: 2 × 76 mm guns; 1 × 20 mm Oerlikon AA gun; 2 × double 45 cm torpedo tubes

The Trygg class was the third and last class of torpedo boats to be built for the Royal Norwegian Navy. The three Trygg ships were constructed from 1919 to 1921 at Moss Verft in Moss (Trygg) and Horten naval yard (Snøgg and Stegg).

Though much larger and better armed than its predecessors, the cigar-shaped 1. and 2. class torpedo boats, the Trygg class was far from modern when it was called upon during the Norwegian Campaign in 1940.

The class was named after its first ship, the Trygg - "trygg" is Norwegian for rugged, safe, stable, secure, dependable.

== Capabilities ==
The Trygg class had a fairly substantial armament for being small ships of relatively early design. Each carried two 76 mm main guns, an Oerlikon 20mm autocannon for anti-aircraft defence, as well as two twin 45 cm torpedo tubes. Combined with a reasonable speed of 25 knots (46 km/h) and excellent manoeuvrability this enabled the Trygg class vessels to operate effectively both in cooperation with other naval units and on their own. Their operations were however limited mostly to coastal waters as they were not very seaworthy or stable platforms, having been constructed for operations close to land. In the fighting that followed the German invasion on 9 April 1940 the Trygg class would see first line action as these ships were often all that was available to the Norwegian forces.

In 1932, the Norwegian Labour Party made public a proposal crafted by Fredrik Monsen, that the armed forces be dissolved entirely and replaced by a "civil guard". The civil guard would include 18 Trygg class vessels, with the armament of two 76 mm main guns and two twin 45 cm torpedo tubes retained. Olaf Kullmann and Erik Anker Steen had contributed to the "civil guard" concept with advice from a naval perspective.

== Fates ==
All three Trygg vessels were lost during the Second World War, one while in Norwegian service and two after having been pressed into service as Torpedoboot Ausland by their German captors.

- Trygg (launched 31 May 1919), commanded by lieutenant Frantz W. Munster, played an instrumental part in the defence of the Romsdalsfjord area in northern Vestlandet. She defended ship traffic and supported allied landings in the Molde - Åndalsnes area (Åndalsnes landings) until being hit by a German bomb on 25 April 1940, sinking in shallow waters the next day. Trygg was salvaged by the Germans in the fall of 1940 and put into service as the patrol boat Zick. The Zick was sunk off Bergen on 23 October 1944 by British planes.
- Snøgg (launched 2 September 1920), commanded by captain N. H. Simensen, operated out of Florø during the Norwegian Campaign and was captured there on 5 May. As the Germans approached the town they made threats to bomb it to the ground should the Royal Norwegian Navy vessels there try to escape. After being taken over by the Germans she was renamed Zack and put into Kriegsmarine service as a patrol boat in occupied Norway. On 1 September 1943 Zack ran aground in the Alverstraumen narrows off Bergen and sank during salvage attempts five days later. The wreck was later raised and scrapped.
- Stegg (launched 16 June 1921), commanded by lieutenant H. M. Hansen, had a brief and intense service in the Norwegian Campaign. She operated in the Hardangerfjord, defending it against enemy forces and taking two German merchants as prizes on 12 and 17 April. Being the most capable allied warship in her area of operation she was constantly racing back and forth patrolling the fjord and responding to reports, mostly unfounded, of hostile activity. The end for Stegg came on 20 April when she was engaged by two Kriegsmarine warships while anchored at Herøysund, blowing up as flames reached her munitions at 0630hrs. She was a total loss, but only formally stricken and sold for scrapping 24 June 1949.

The German names for Trygg and Snøgg were basically word play, especially when seen together: Zick and Zack means 'Zigzag' in German.

== Bibliography ==
- Abelsen, Frank (1986). Norwegian naval ships 1939–1945 (in Norwegian and English). Oslo: Sem & Stenersen AS. ISBN 82-7046-050-8.
- Johannesen, Folke Hauger (1988). Gå på eller gå under (in Norwegian). Oslo: Faktum Forlag AS. ISBN 82-540-0113-8.
- Ørvik, Nils (1960). Solidaritet eller nøytralitet?. Sikkerhetspolitikken 1920–1939 (in Norwegian). Vol. 1. Oslo: J. G. Tanum.
- Sivertsen, Svein Carl, ed. (1999). Jageren Sleipner i Romsdalsfjord sjøforsvarsdistrikt april 1940 (in Norwegian). Hundvåg: Sjømilitære Samfund ved Norsk Tidsskrift for Sjøvesen.
