= List of shipwrecks of Europe =

This is a list of shipwrecks located in and around the continent of Europe.

== Albania ==
Ship	Flag	Sunk date	Notes	Coordinates
HMS Phoenix	Royal Navy	14 May 1918	An Acheron-class destroyer that was torpedoed by U-27 and sank under tow off Vlorë, Albania.	40°23.5′N 19°14′E

== Belgium ==
Ship	Flag	Sunk date	Notes	Coordinates
HMS Basilisk	Royal Navy	1 June 1940	A B-class destroyer that was sunk by German bombers off Koksijde.	51°08′16″N 02°35′06″E
HMS Brilliant	Royal Navy	23 April 1918	An Apollo-class cruiser scuttled as a blockship in the mouth of Ostend harbour.	
Empire Blessing	United Kingdom	19 March 1945	A cargo ship that stuck a naval mine in the River Scheldt.	51°24′N 3°17′E
HMS Grafton	Royal Navy	29 May 1940	A G-class destroyer that was torpedoed by U-62 off Nieuwpoort.	51°24′N 2°49′E
Herald of Free Enterprise	United Kingdom	6 March 1987	A RORO ferry that capsized four minutes out from Zeebrugge, resulting in 193 deaths.	51°22′28.5″N 3°11′26″E
HMS LST-420	Royal Navy	7 November 1944	A tank landing ship that struck a naval mine off Ostend.	51°15.033′N 2°41.798′E
U-5	Imperial German Navy	18 December 1914	A Type U 5 U-boat that sank north of Zeebrugge.	51°23′N 3°11′E
U-11	Imperial German Navy	9 December 1914	A German submarine mined in the First Battle of the Atlantic.	51°06′N 1°29′E
UB-10	Imperial German Navy	5 October 1918	A Type UB I U-boat that was scuttled off Zeebrugge.	51°21′N 3°12′E
UB-59	Imperial German Navy	5 October 1918	A Type UB III U-boat that was scuttled off Zeebrugge.	51°19′N 03°12′E
UC-3	Imperial German Navy	27 May 1916	A German minelaying submarine that struck a naval mine off Zeebrugge.	
UC-62	Imperial German Navy	14 October 1917	A German minelaying submarine sunk by a naval mine off Zeebrugge.	
UC-77	Imperial German Navy	14 July 1918	A German minelaying submarine sunk by a mine off Flanders.	
't Vliegend Hert	Dutch East India Company	3 February 1735	An East Indiaman that ran aground off Zeebrugge.	
Z8 Bruno Heinemann	Kriegsmarine	25 January 1942	A German destroyer sunk by naval mines laid by HMS Plover.	

== Bulgaria ==
Ship	Flag	Sunk date	Notes	Coordinates
Mopang	United States	30 June 1921	A steamship that struck a naval mine off Burgas.	42°28.086′N 27°41.685′E
Rodina	Bulgaria	19 September 1941	A cargo ship that struck a naval mine off Burgas.	42°23′N 27°48′E

== Canary Islands ==
Ship	Flag	Sunk date	Notes	Coordinates
American Star	Greece	18 January 1993	An ocean liner that ran aground on Fuerteventura under tow, then split in half and broke into many pieces.	28.346077°N 14.180442°W
El Condesito	Spain	1 January 1972	A cement barge that ran aground off Arona, Tenerife.	
Telamon	Greece	31 October 1981	A cargo ship that was forced aground near Arricife, Lanzarote.	

== Corsica ==
Ship	Flag	Sunk date	Notes	Coordinates
Sémillante	French Navy	15 February 1855	A Surveillante-class frigate that sank in a severe storm in the Strait of Bonifacio.	

== Croatia ==
Ship	Flag	Sunk date	Notes	Coordinates
Audace	Regia Marina	1 November 1944	An Urakaze-class destroyer that was sunk by HMS Wheatland and HMS Avon Vale off Pag, during the Action of 1 November 1944.	
Baron Gautsch	Austria-Hungary	12 August 1914	An Austrian steam liner sunk by an underwater mine near Rovinj.	
Cesare Rossarol	Regia Marina	16 November 1918	An Italian Alessandro Poerio-class cruiser sunk by an underwater mine near Ližnjan.	
Giuseppe Garibaldi	Regia Marina	18 July 1915	A Giuseppe Garibaldi-class armored cruiser that was torpedoed by U-4 southeast of Dubrovnik.	
SMS Niobe	Kriegsmarine	22 December 1943	A Gazelle-class light cruiser that ran aground on Silba and was sunk by British motor torpedo boats.	44°22′N 14°42′E
Peltastis	Greece	8 January 1968	A Greek cargo ship sunk in bad weather at sea.	45°9′49″N 14°38′44″E
SMS Szent István	Austria-Hungary	10 June 1918	A Tegetthoff-class dreadnought battleship that was sunk off Molat island by Italian torpedo boat MAS-15.	44°12′07″N 14°27′05″E
UB-129	Imperial German Navy	31 October 1918	A Type UB III U-boat that was scuttled at Rijeka.	45°19′N 14°26′E
SMS Viribus Unitis	Austria-Hungary	1 November 1918	A Tegetthoff-class dreadnought battleship that was sunk at anchor at Pula by an Italian human torpedo.	44°52′9″N 13°49′9″E

== Cyprus ==
Ship	Flag	Sunk date	Notes	Coordinates
Constandis	Russia	22 February 2014	A Russian trawler intentionally sunk in 25 metres (82 ft) water off the coast of Limassol.	
HMS Cricket	Royal Navy	1947	A gunboat that sank at Larnaca.	
Demetrios II	United Kingdom	23 March 1998	A cargo ship that ran aground off Paphos in heavy seas, during a voyage from Greece to Syria with a cargo of timber.	
Kyrenia ship	Unknown	Unknown	A Greek merchant ship dating to the 4th century BC that now sits on display in a museum at Kyrenia Castle.	
Lady Thetis	Cyprus	22 February 2014	A German made pleasure craft intentionally sunk in 18 metres (59 ft) water off the coast of Limassol.	
Zenobia	Sweden	7 June 1980	A Swedish ro-ro ferry that sank 1-mile (1.6 km) off the port of Larnaca.	

== Denmark ==
Ship	Flag	Sunk date	Notes	Coordinates
Alexander Nevsky	Imperial Russian Navy	25 September 1868	A Russian frigate that ran aground off the coast of Thyborøn.	56°41′N 08°08′E
HMS Black Prince	Royal Navy	31 May 1916	A Duke of Edinburgh-class armored cruiser that sank at the Battle of Jutland. The site is a protected place.	
Dannebroge	Royal Danish Navy	4 October 1710	A ship of the line that exploded and sank in the Great Northern War during the action of 4 October 1710.	55°29.53′N 12°30.17′E
HMS Defence	Royal Navy	24 December 1811	A 74-gun third-rate ship of the line that stranded off Thorsminde in heavy storm, together with HMS St George.	56.3583°N 8.1°E
HMS Defence	Royal Navy	31 May 1916	A Minotaur-class armoured cruiser that suffered a magazine explosion during the Battle of Jutland. The site is a protected place.	56°58′02″N 05°49′50″E
SMS Elbing	Imperial German Navy	1 June 1916	A Pillau-class light cruiser that was scuttled following a collision with SMS Posen in the Battle of Jutland.	
SMS Frauenlob	Imperial German Navy	31 May 1916	A Gazelle-class light cruiser that was torpedoed and shelled during the Battle of Jutland.	
Freja af Stockholm	Sweden	20 February 1994	A Swedish tugboat that sank outside Frederikshavn. The vessel now rests at a depth of 23 metres (75 ft).	57°27′N 10°40′E
Fu Shan Hai	People's Republic of China	31 May 2003	A Chinese bulk carrier that sank after a collision with the Cypriot container vessel Gdynia, without injury or loss of life.	
HMS Indefatigable	Royal Navy	31 May 1916	An Indefatigable-class battlecruiser that suffered a magazine explosion during the Battle of Jutland. The site is a protected place.	
HMS Invincible	Royal Navy	31 May 1916	An Invincible-class battlecruiser that was sunk in the Battle of Jutland. The site is a protected place.	57°02′40″N 6°07′15″E
Kolding cog	Unknown	Unknown	A wreck discovered in Kolding Fjord, thought to date from around 1190.	
SMS Lützow	Imperial German Navy	1 June 1916	A Derfflinger-class battlecruiser that was scuttled off Horns Reef after severe damage in the Battle of Jutland.	56°15′N 5°53′E
HMS Pandora	Royal Navy	13 February 1811	A Cruizer-class brig-sloop that ran aground off Skagen, Jutland.	
SMS Pommern	Imperial German Navy	1 June 1916	A Deutschland-class predreadnought battleship that suffered a magazine explosion during the Battle of Jutland.	
HMS Queen Mary	Royal Navy	31 May 1916	A battlecruiser that suffered a magazine explosion during the Battle of Jutland. The site is a protected place.	
HMS St George	Royal Navy	24 December 1811	A 98-gun second-rate ship of the line that stranded off Thorsminde in heavy storm, together with HMS Defence.	56°21′30″N 8°6′00″E
U-20	Imperial German Navy	4 November 1916	A Type U 19 U-boat that ran aground and was scuttled by her crew on the following day.	56°33′N 08°08′E
U-235	Kriegsmarine	14 April 1945	A Type VIIC U-boat that was accidentally sunk by the German torpedo boat T17 off Skagen.	57°44′N 10°39′E
U-579	Kriegsmarine	5 May 1945	A Type VIIC U-boat that was sunk by a British aircraft east of Aarhus.	56°10′N 11°04′E
HMS Warrior	Royal Navy	1 June 1916	A Duke of Edinburgh-class armored cruiser that foundered under tow after severe damage in the Battle of Jutland. The site is a protected place.	

== Estonia ==
Ship	Flag	Sunk date	Notes	Coordinates
Estonia	Estonia	28 September 1994	A cruise ferry that sunk in international waters of the Baltic Sea, about 40 kilometres (22 nmi) south-southeast of Utö island, Finland, claiming 852 lives.	59°23′N 21°42′E
Maasilinn Wreck	Unknown	Unknown	A wreck off Saaremaa island dating to the 16th century.	
U-679	Kriegsmarine	9 January 1945	A Type VIIC U-boat that was sunk by a mine.	

== Faroe Islands ==
Ship	Flag	Sunk date	Notes	Coordinates
Lincoln City	United Kingdom	1941	A British trawler that was sunk in Tórshavn Harbour.	
Sauternes	United Kingdom	7 December 1941	A steamship that sank after a storm in the sound of Fugloyarfjørður.	
Tjaldur	Denmark	27 June 1946	Sank after hitting the nesse of Mjóvanes.	

== Finland ==
Ship	Flag	Sunk date	Notes	Coordinates
Föglö wreck	Unknown	Unknown	A 19th-century schooner that was discovered in 2003 off Föglö, along with a well-preserved cargo of champagne.	
Hanneke Vrome	Free City of Lübeck	20 November 1468	A ship of the Hanseatic League that was wrecked in a storm off Raseborg.	
Sankt Nikolai	Imperial Russian Navy	1790	A Russian frigate sunk in the Battle of Svensksund.	
Vrouw Maria	Dutch Republic	9 October 1771	A Dutch merchant ship that ran aground and sank.	

== Germany ==
Ship	Flag	Sunk date	Notes	Coordinates
Cap Arcona	Germany	3 May 1945	A German luxury ocean liner that was sunk in Lübeck Bay.	54°3.9′N 10°50.45′E
Fides	Italy	23 January 1962	A freighter that was stranded on Grosser Vogelsand off the mouth of the Elbe River.	
Hugo Zeye	Kriegsmarine	14 March 1945	A training ship that struck a naval mine northwest of Fehmarn.	54°33′39″N 10°52′30″E
Ondo	United Kingdom	6 December 1961	A British freighter that was stranded on Grosser Vogelsand off the mouth of the Elbe River.	
Preußen	Germany	13 August 1944	A Vorpostenboot that was sunk by British aircraft off Spiekeroog.	53°50′N 7°40′E
SMS Seeadler	Imperial German Navy	19 April 1917	A Bussard-class cruiser that was being used as a mine hulk when a naval mine exploded on board, sinking Seeadler in the Jade Bight.	53°29′N 8°12′E
U-8	Kriegsmarine	2 May 1945	A Type IIB U-boat that was scuttled at Wilhelmshaven.	53°31′N 8°10′E
U-60	Kriegsmarine	2 May 1945	A Type IIC U-boat that was scuttled at Wilhelmshaven.	
U-61	Kriegsmarine	2 May 1945	A Type IIC U-boat that was scuttled at Wilhelmshaven.	
U-103	Kriegsmarine	15 April 1945	A Type IXB U-boat that was sunk by Canadian bombers at Kiel.	54.326°N 10.164°E
U-236	Kriegsmarine	5 May 1945	A Type VIIC U-boat that was scuttled near Schleimünde.	54°37′N 10°03′E
U-237	Kriegsmarine	4 April 1945	A Type VIIC U-boat that was sunk by British bombs at Kiel.	
U-276	Kriegsmarine	3 May 1945	A Type VIIC U-boat that was scuttled at Neustadt after taking damage from British aircraft.	
U-287	Kriegsmarine	16 May 1945	A Type VIIC U-boat that was sunk, possibly by a mine, in the Elbe estuary.	53°50′N 08°50′E
U-316	Kriegsmarine	2 May 1945	A Type VIIC U-boat that was scuttled near Travemünde.	53°58′N 10°53′E
U-323	Kriegsmarine	3 May 1945	A Type VIIC/41 U-boat that was scuttled near Nordenham.	53°30′N 08°30′E
U-339	Kriegsmarine	3 May 1945	A Type VIIC U-boat that was scuttled near Wilhelmshaven.	53°31′N 08°10′E
U-345	Kriegsmarine	December 1945	A Type VIIC U-boat that was scuttled off Warnemünde.	
U-348	Kriegsmarine	30 March 1945	A Type VIIC U-boat that was sunk by American aircraft near Hamburg.	53°33′N 09°57′E
U-350	Kriegsmarine	30 March 1945	A Type VIIC U-boat that was sunk by American aircraft near Hamburg.	53°33′N 09°57′E
U-777	Kriegsmarine	15 October 1944	A Type VIIC U-boat that was sunk by British aircraft off Wilhelmshaven.	53°51′N 08°10′E
U-870	Kriegsmarine	30 March 1945	A Type IXC/40 U-boat that was sunk by American bombs at Bremen.	53°04′N 08°50′E
U-979	Kriegsmarine	24 May 1945	A Type VIIC U-boat that ran aground and was scuttled at Amrum.	54°38′N 08°23′E
U-1221	Kriegsmarine	3 April 1945	A Type IXC/40 U-boat that was sunk by US aircraft at Kiel.	54°20′N 10°10′E

== Gibraltar ==
Ship	Flag	Sunk date	Notes	Coordinates
RFA Bedenham		27 April 1951	A naval armament carrier that exploded at Gun Wharf.	36.135183°N 5.355096°W
Fedra	Liberia	10 October 2008	A cargo ship that ran aground at Europa Point in gale-force winds.	36.110534°N 5.344812°W
New Flame	Panama	12 August 2007	A cargo ship that collided with Torm Gertrud off Europa Point.	36°06′06″N 5°20′45″W
HMS Sussex	Royal Navy	1 March 1694	An English ship-of-the-line lost in a severe storm.	

== Greece ==
Ship	Flag	Sunk date	Notes	Coordinates
Antikythera wreck	Unknown	Unknown	A wreck on Antikythera island that contained the Antikythera mechanism and dates from approximately 86 BC.	35.8897°N 23.3078°E
Bartolomeo Colleoni	Regia Marina	19 July 1940	A Condottieri-class light cruiser that was sunk in the Battle of Cape Spada.	35°41′34″N 23°43′14″E
HMHS Britannic	Royal Navy	21 November 1916	A White Star Liner sunk by flooding after striking a mine near the isle of Kea.	37°42′05″N 24°17′02″E
SS Burdigala	France	14 November 1916	A troop ship and former ocean liner that sank after striking a mine near Kea.	
Dimitrios shipwreck	Greece	23 December 1981	A small freight ship that was swept away by the sea from the port of Gythio and left stranded on a sandy beach.	
Dokos shipwreck	Unknown	c. 2200 BCE	The oldest known underwater shipwreck discovery, dating to c. 2200 BCE.	
HMS Dulverton	Royal Navy	13 November 1943	A Hunt-class destroyer that was attacked by German aircraft in the Battle of Leros and scuttled.	36°50′N 27°30′E
Elli	Hellenic Navy	15 August 1940	A protected cruiser that was sunk by the Italian submarine Delfino off Tinos.	37°32′9″N 25°9′3″E
Express Samina	Greece	26 September 2000	A RO-RO passenger ferry that capsized after hitting a rock off the island of Paros.	
HMS Gloucester	Royal Navy	22 May 1941	A Town-class light cruiser that was sunk by German dive bombers in the Battle of Crete.	35°50′N 23°0′E
HMS Greyhound	Royal Navy	22 May 1941	A G-class destroyer that was sunk by German dive bombers northwest of Crete.	36°00′N 23°10′E
HMS Hereward	Royal Navy	29 May 1941	An H-class destroyer that was sunk by German dive bombers off Crete.	35°20′N 26°20′E
HMS Hurworth	Royal Navy	22 October 1943	A Hunt-class destroyer that struck a mine east of Kalymnos.	36°59′N 27°06′E
Hydra	Hellenic Navy	22 April 1941	A Greek destroyer that was sunk by German bombers off Kardiotissa.	
HMS Intrepid	Royal Navy	27 September 1943	An I-class destroyer that was sunk by German aircraft at Leros.	37°7′N 26°51′E
Jupiter	Greece	21 October 1988	A cruise ship that collided with an Italian freighter off Piraeus.	37.9250°N 23.6083°E
HMS Kashmir	Royal Navy	23 May 1941	A K-class destroyer that was sunk by German dive bomber aircraft south of Gavdos.	34°40′N 24°10′E
HMS Kelly	Royal Navy	23 May 1941	A K-class destroyer that was sunk by German dive bomber aircraft south of Gavdos.	34°40′N 24°10′E
HMS M28	Royal Navy	20 January 1918	An M15-class monitor that was sunk in the Battle of Imbros.	40°13′43″N 25°57′46″E
Mediterranean Sky	Greece	11 January 2003	An ocean liner that capsized in Elevsis Bay.	
Mimis	Greece	8 July 1943	HMS Taurus sank the Greek sailing vessel Mimis with explosives, off Skiathos, Greece.	
Nordland	Antigua and Barbuda	August 2000	Cargo ship that ran aground off the port of Diakofti in Kithira Island where its stern can be seen jutting out of the water still.	
Panagiotis	Greece	1 October 1980	A coastal trading ship run aground on the isle of Zakynthos, while allegedly smuggling cigarettes from Turkey.	37°51′34.57″N 20°37′29.5″E
Patris	Kingdom of Greece	1868	A wheel steamboat lost off Kea Island.	37°34′44.18″N 24°15′46.42″E
HMS Perseus	Royal Navy	6 December 1941	A submarine sunk by a naval mine near the island of Kefalonia.	37°54′0″N 20°54′0″E
Rasa Sayang	Greece	27 August 1980	A Cruise ship that burned and capsized in Perma Bay.	37°56′51.8″N 23°33′57.5″E
Sea Diamond	Greece	6 April 2007	A Greek cruise ship that struck a reef off the harbor of Santorini island and sank the following day.	36°23′41″N 25°25′51″E
Sebastiano Veniero	Italy	9 December 1941	A cargo ship that was torpedoed by HMS Porpoise off Methoni, while carrying 2,000 UK and Dominion prisoners of war.	36°49′N 21°42′E
Slamat	Netherlands	27 April 1941	A troopship that was sunk by German aircraft south of Spetses during the Battle of Greece.	37.02°N 23.17°E
Thérèse	French Navy	24 June 1669	A French warship that sunk off Heraklion after an accidental explosion of the powder-keg.	
U-133	Kriegsmarine	1942	A German U-boat that sunk at Saronikos Gulf after hitting a Greek mine.	
U-596	Kriegsmarine	24 September 1944	A German Type VIIC U-boat that was scuttled near Salamis Island.	37°59′N 23°34′E
Vasilissa Olga	Hellenic Navy	26 September 1943	A Greek destroyer sunk by Luftwaffe bombers in the port of Leros island.	

== Iceland ==
Ship	Flag	Sunk date	Notes	Coordinates
USCGC Alexander Hamilton	United States Coast Guard	30 January 1942	A Treasury-class cutter that was torpedoed by U-132 off Reykjavík, and sank the next day.	64.10°N 22.56°W
Goðafoss	Iceland	10 November 1944	A cargo ship that was torpedoed by U-300 off Gardskagi. Totals of 42 casualties and 21 survivors.	6°6′N 22°45′W
HMS Niger	Royal Navy	5 July 1942	A Halcyon-class minesweeper that was sunk by a mine off the Westfjords.	66°35′N 23°14′W
U-253	Kriegsmarine	25 September 1942	A Type VIIC U-boat that sank in the Denmark Strait.	66°59′59.9″N 23°0′0″W

== Ireland ==
Ship	Flag	Sunk date	Notes	Coordinates
Alondra	United Kingdom	29 December 1916	A British steamship that ran aground in fog on Kedge Rocks near Baltimore Island.	51°27′40″N 09°20′44″W
RMS Andania	United Kingdom	27 January 1918	A cargo ship that was torpedoed by U-46 northeast of Rathlin Island.	55°20′N 6°12′W
HMS Audacious	Royal Navy	27 October 1914	A British battleship that sank after striking a German mine near Lough Swilly.	
Bolivar	Norway	4 March 1947	A Norwegian motor vessel that ran aground on the Kish Bank during a snow storm.	
RMS Carpathia	United Kingdom	17 July 1918	A Cunard Line transatlantic passenger steamship famous for coming to the rescue of RMS Titanic in 1912. It was torpedoed and sunk by German U-boat U-55.	49.4667°N 19.7667°W
Chirripo	United Kingdom	28 December 1917	A 4,050 GRT Elders & Fyffes cargo liner and banana boat running the Avonmouth to Jamaica route. She struck a mine laid by UC-75 0.5 nautical miles (0.93 km) SE of Black Head lighthouse in Belfast Lough and sank, without loss of life.	
Cymric	United Kingdom	8 May 1916	A steamship that was torpedoed by German submarine U-20.	
Dido	Germany	1883	A barque that sank off Kedge Island, near Baltimore, County Cork.	51°28′N 09°19′W
Edmond	Colony of New Brunswick	19 November 1850	A passenger sailing vessel that sank off the coast of Kilkee, County Clare.	52°40′53.15″N 09°39′19.27″W
RMS Empress of Britain	United Kingdom	28 October 1940	An ocean liner bombed by aircraft and then torpedoed and sunk by U-32.	55°16′N 9°50′W
Ems	Germany	28 October 1927	A sailing ship that caught fire and was abandoned at sea.	
Fulmar	United Kingdom	30 January 1886	A cargo ship that sunk in a storm off the coast of Kilkee, County Clare. 17 lost their lives.	52°42′59.0718″N 09°37′30.50″W
Housatonic	United Kingdom	3 January 1908	A tanker that ran aground off the Maidens.	
Illyrian		May 1884	A very broken-up steamer that sank after colliding with the cliffs in fog on the eastern side of Cape Clear Island, County Cork.	51°26′N 09°29′W
Innisfallen	United Kingdom	23 May 1918	A steamer that was torpedoed by U-64 26 kilometres (14 nmi) east of the Kish Light Vessel.	
Kowloon Bridge	Hong Kong	December 1986	A Bridge-class ore-bulk-oil carrier that sank with its cargo of iron ore when sailing from Sept-Îles, Quebec to the River Clyde.	51°28′N 09°14′W
RMS Laconia	United Kingdom	25 February 1917	A Cunard Line ocean liner sunk near Fastnet Rock by German submarine U-50.	52°0′N 13°40′W
La Juliana	Spain	1588	A ship of the Spanish Armada that was driven aground at Streedagh Strand, then in Cairbre, now County Sligo.	
La Lavia	Spain	1588	A ship of the Spanish Armada that was driven aground at Streedagh Strand, then in Cairbre, now County Sligo.	
Laurentic	United Kingdom	25 January 1917	An armed merchantman that struck two naval mines off Lough Swilly.	55.262°N 6.818°W
HMS Lee	Royal Navy	5 October 1909	A C-class destroyer that was wrecked off Blacksod Bay.	
RMS Leinster	United Kingdom	10 October 1918	The Dublin to Holyhead mailboat, torpedoed and sunk 6 kilometres (3.2 nmi) east of the Kish Lighthouse by UB-123.	
HMHS Llandovery Castle	Royal Navy	27 June 1918	A hospital ship that was torpedoed by U-86, with the loss of 234 lives.	51°18′00″N 009°54′00″W
RMS Lusitania	United Kingdom	7 May 1915	A British ocean liner torpedoed and sunk by the German U-boat U-20.	51°25′N 8°33′W
Minnehaha	United Kingdom	7 September 1917	An ocean liner torpedoed by German submarine U-48 near Fastnet Rock.	
MV Plassy	Ireland	8 March 1960	A cargo ship, wrecked off the coast of Inisheer, the smallest of the Aran Islands, and has since been thrown above high tide mark at Carraig na Finise. Islanders rescued the entire crew from the stricken vessel – an event captured in a pictorial display at the National Maritime Museum in Dún Laoghaire, County Dublin. The wreck appears in the opening credits of the comedy series Father Ted.	
Ranga	Spain	11 March 1982	A Spanish container ship on charter to the Icelandic shipping company, Hafskip. It was washed onto rocks at Dunmore head, near Slea Head on the Dingle Peninsula after losing engine power in a storm. The 15 crew members were rescued by the local rocket team and a Royal Air Force helicopter. Some of the wreck was removed in 1991 due to filming, and the bow and other wreckage is still visible today.	52°6′33″N 10°28′6″W
Rochdale and Prince of Wales		20 November 1807	The sinking of the Rochdale and the Prince of Wales in Dublin Bay resulted in 400 deaths and the building of a new harbour.	53.301603°N 6.157072°W
Rockingham		23 December 1775	A vessel that ran aground near Cobh.	
Samson	Malta	12 December 1987	A crane barge that ran aground at Ardmore.	
Santa Maria de Visón	Spain	1588	A ship of the Spanish Armada that was driven aground at Streedagh Strand, then in Cairbre, now County Sligo.	
RMS Tayleur	United Kingdom	21 January 1854	A White Star Line clipper that ran aground and sank off Lambay Island 8 kilometres (4.3 nmi) from Dublin Bay.	53°28′54″N 06°01′12″W
Trinidad Valencera	Spain	1588	At 1,100 tonnes, one of the Spanish Armada's largest ships; wrecked 32 kilometres (17 nmi) west of Lacada Point in Kinnagoe Bay, County Donegal.	
Tullaghmurray Lass	Ireland	February 2002	A fishing boat that sank 11 kilometres (5.9 nmi) off Kilkeel.	54.060°N 5.993°W
U-68	Imperial German Navy	22 March 1916	A Type U 66 submarine that was sunk by HMS Farnborough off Dingle.	51°54′N 10°53′W
U-260	Kriegsmarine	12 March 1945	A Type VIIC U-boat that was scuttled 6 kilometres (3.2 nmi) south of Glandore.	51°15′N 09°05′W
U-637	Royal Navy	9 May 1945	A Type VIIC U-boat that was scuttled as part of Operation Deadlight.	55°35′N 07°46′W
U-778	Royal Navy	4 December 1945	A Type VIIC U-boat that was surrendered to the Allies. It was towed offshore to be scuttled as part of Operation Deadlight, but sank before reaching the scuttling ground.	55°32′N 7°7′W
U-802	Royal Navy	31 December 1945	A Type IXC/40 U-boat that was surrendered to the British and sank under tow northwest of Tory Island.	55°30′N 8°25′W
U-825	Royal Navy	3 January 1946	A Type VIIC U-boat that was scuttled northwest of Malin Head as part of Operation Deadlight.	55°31′N 07°30′W
U-861	Royal Navy	31 December 1945	A Type IXD2 U-boat that was scuttled as part of Operation Deadlight.	55°25′N 07°15′W
UC-33	Imperial German Navy	26 September 1917	A Type UC II submarine that was sunk by HMS PC61 in St. George's Channel.	51°55′N 6°14′W
UC-42	Imperial German Navy	10 September 1917	A Type UC II submarine that sank for unknown reasons off Roche's Point.	51°44′N 08°12′W
HMS Wasp	Royal Navy	22 November 1884	A gunboat wrecked off Tory Island.	
HMS Wolverine	Royal Navy	12 December 1917	A Beagle-class destroyer that collided with Rosemary off Arranmore.	55.166°N 8.685°W
York	East India Company	29 October 1758	An East Indiaman that was deliberately mis-piloted by prisoners who had taken over another vessel.	

== Isle of Man ==
Ship	Flag	Sunk date	Notes	Coordinates
Solway Harvester	United Kingdom	11 January 2000	A scallop dredger that sunk in a storm off Ramsey, and was later raised and laid up at Douglas.	54°05′51″N 4°09′52″W

== Italy ==
Ship	Flag	Sunk date	Notes	Coordinates
Caligula's Giant Ship	Roman Empire	Unknown	The remains of a wooden barge discovered in Fiumicino.	
Dia	Panama	14 October 1964	A cargo ship that developed a leak and sank south of Savona.	44°12′N 08°38′E
F174	Egypt	December 1996	An unidentified ship carrying illegal immigrants to Sicily, sunk with the loss of at least 283 lives. For five years, the wreck's existence was kept from the authorities by local fishermen, who feared an investigation would interfere with their livelihood.	36°25′31″N 14°54′34″E
Giglio Island shipwreck	Unknown	Unknown	An Etruscan wreck off Giglio Island, dating to the early Iron Age, c. 600 BC.	
Giovanni delle Bande Nere	Regia Marina	1 April 1942	A Giussano-class light cruiser that was sunk by HMS Urge off Stromboli.	38°42′32″N 15°0′31″E
Haven	Cyprus	14 April 1991	A 230,000 GRT VLCC oil tanker that sunk off Genoa following an onboard explosion and fire, becoming the largest wreck in the Mediterranean Sea.	44.22°N 8.46°E
HMS Hebe	Royal Navy	22 November 1943	A Halcyon-class minesweeper that was sunk by a naval mine off Bari.	41°8′N 16°52′E
HMS Inglefield	Royal Navy	25 February 1944	An I-class destroyer that was sunk by a German bomber aircraft off Nettuno.	41°26′N 12°38′E
HMS Janus	Royal Navy	23 January 1944	A J-class destroyer that was sunk by a German torpedo bomber aircraft off Anzio.	41°26′N 12°38′E
Loreto	Italy	13 October 1942	A cargo ship that was torpedoed by HMS Unruffled about 8 nautical miles (15 km) west of Capo Gallo, near Palermo, Sicily.	
Marsala Punic shipwreck	Punic	Unknown	The wreck of a warship (Punic Ship) and of another vessel (Sister Ship) discovered in the harbour of Marsala in, believed to date from around 235 BC.	
Mazara del Vallo Roman shipwreck	Roman Republic	2nd–1st century BC	A Roman shipwreck discovered in 2026 about three miles off Mazara del Vallo, Sicily, at a depth of 46 metres (151 ft). The wreck contains hundreds of amphorae, predominantly of the Dressel 1A type.	
Nemi ships	Roman Empire	Unknown	Two large ships built by the Roman emperor Caligula at Lake Nemi in the 1st century AD. The wrecks were recovered from the lake in 1932, and largely destroyed by fire during World War II.	41°43′20″N 12°42′6″E
HMS Odin	Royal Navy	14 June 1940	An Odin-class submarine that was sunk by Italian destroyers in the Gulf of Taranto.	39°30′0″N 17°30′0″E
HMS Pakenham	Royal Navy	16 April 1943	A P-class destroyer that was damaged by Italian ships and scuttled off Mazara del Vallo.	37°26′N 12°30′E
USS Portent	United States Navy	22 January 1944	An Auk-class minesweeper that was sunk by a naval mine off Nettuno.	41°24′N 12°44′E
Principessa Jolanda	Italy	22 September 1907	An ocean liner that sank during its launch.	
Roma	Regia Marina	9 September 1943	A Littorio-class battleship that was sunk by German aircraft off Asinara.	41°9′28″N 8°17′35″E
USS SC-694	United States Navy	23 August 1943	An SC-497-class submarine chaser that was sunk by German dive bomber aircraft off Palermo, Sicily.	38°08′N 13°22′E
Scindian	Italy	3 November 1880	A barque and convict ship that sank off Rio Marina.	
HMS Spartan	Royal Navy	29 January 1944	A Dido-class cruiser that was sunk by German aircraft off Anzio.	41°26′2″N 12°41′2″E
USS Swerve	United States Navy	9 July 1944	An Auk-class minesweeper that was sunk by a naval mine off Anzio.	41°31′N 12°28′E
HMS Thetis	Royal Navy	14 March 1943	A T-class submarine that was sunk by the Italian corvette Cicogna off Sicily.	38°15′0″N 13°15′0″E
Torero	United Kingdom	1 November 1916	A cargo ship that was sunk by U-21 north of Palermo, Sicily.	38°30′N 13°28′E
Transylvania	United Kingdom	4 May 1917	An ocean liner that was torpedoed by U-63 near Bergeggi Island, Savona.	
UJ 2210	Kriegsmarine	28 May 1944	A naval trawler that was sunk by American motor torpedo boats off Deiva Marina.	

== Latvia ==
Ship	Flag	Sunk date	Notes	Coordinates
Lady Kathleen	Norway	29 November 1951	A concrete ship that ran aground in a storm en route from Helsinki to Riga. The wreck is above the surface of the water.	57.0708°N 24.0460°E
Moero	Kriegsmarine	22 September 1944	A troopship that was sunk by Soviet bomber aircraft while carrying evacuees from Estonia. Nearly 2,700 out of 3,350 people aboard were killed.	

== Lithuania ==
Ship	Flag	Sunk date	Notes	Coordinates
U-580	Kriegsmarine	11 November 1941	A Type VIIC U-boat that collided with the target ship Angelburg west of Klaipėda.	55°45′N 20°40′E

== Malta ==
Ship	Flag	Sunk date	Notes	Coordinates
HMY Aegusa	Royal Navy	28 April 1916	A Royal Navy yacht that was sunk by mines laid by U-73	35.8900°N 14.6900°E
HMS Ariel	Royal Navy	19 April 1907	A D-class destroyer that ran aground on a breakwater outside Grand Harbour.	
Camadan	Turkey	12 March 2002	A Turkish cargo ship that took on water and sank off Malta due to bad weather.	35.51°N 14.53°E
Cominoland	Malta	12 August 2006	A Gozo ferry that was decommissioned and scuttled as an artificial reef.	36.0175°N 14.2866°E
HM Drifter Eddy	Royal Navy	26 May 1942	A drifter converted into a minesweeper that struck a mine off Grand Harbour.	35.9081°N 14.5353°E
Gozo Phoenician shipwreck	Phoenician	Late 7th century BC	Phoenician trade ship discovered in 2007 by a team of French scientists during a sonar survey off the coast of Gozo island.	36.0260°N 14.2080°E
HMS Hellespont	Royal Navy	7 April 1942	A Robust-class tugboat that was sunk by German or Italian aircraft at Grand Harbour, then raised and scuttled off Valletta.	35.9015°N 14.5411°E
Hephaestus	Togo	29 August 2022	An oil tanker which ran aground at Qawra on 10 February 2018, then deliberately scuttled as an artificial reef off Xatt l-Aħmar, Gozo in 2022.	36°1′2.85″N 14°17′19.11″E
Imperial Eagle	Malta	19 July 1999	A Gozo ferry that was decommissioned and scuttled as an artificial reef.	35.9635°N 14.4338°E
HMS Jersey	Royal Navy	2 May 1941	A J-class destroyer that struck a naval mine off Grand Harbour.	35°54′N 14°31.4′E
Karwela	Malta	12 August 2006	A Captain Morgan ferry boat that was decommissioned and scuttled as an artificial reef.	36.0175°N 14.2866°E
ORP Kujawiak	Polish Navy	16 June 1942	A Hunt-class destroyer that struck a mine during Operation Harpoon.	35°53′N 14°35′E
Lady Davinia	Malta	2008	The tour boat (formerly a minesweeper) that sunk off its moorings at Sliema.	35°54.4′N 14°30.446′E
Levant II	Malta	1952	A cable ship that was decommissioned and scuttled off the Grand Harbour.	35.9083°N 14.5346°E
Luciston	United Kingdom	29 November 1916	A collier that was sunk by a torpedo fired by UC-22.	35.7912°N 14.5917°E
HMS Maori	Royal Navy	12 February 1942	A Tribal-class destroyer that was sunk by German aircraft at Grand Harbour, then raised and scuttled off Valletta.	35°54′17″N 14°31′08″E
Margit	Free France	19 April 1941	A French passenger ship that was sunk by German aircraft in Kalkara.	35.8912°N 14.5222°E
HMS Nasturtium	Royal Navy	28 April 1916	An Arabis-class sloop that was sunk by naval mines laid by U-73	35.8936°N 14.7097°E
HMS Olympus	Royal Navy	8 May 1942	An Odin-class submarine that was sunk by a mine.	35°55′N 14°35′E
P29	Maritime Squadron of the Armed Forces of Malta	14 August 2007	A Kondor-class patrol boat that was decommissioned and scuttled as an artificial reef.	35°59′16″N 14°19′43″E
P31	Maritime Squadron of the Armed Forces of Malta	25 August 2009	A Kondor-class patrol boat that was decommissioned and scuttled as an artificial reef.	36°01′N 14°20′E
P33	Maritime Squadron of the Armed Forces of Malta	31 July 2021	A Bremse-class patrol boat that was decommissioned and scuttled as an artificial reef.	35.8658°N 14.5755°E
Polynesien	France	10 August 1918	A French passenger ship that was sunk by a torpedo fired by UC-22.	35.8576°N 14.6051°E
Rozi	Malta	September 1992	A tugboat that was decommissioned and scuttled as an artificial reef.	40°39′01″N 14°32′44″E
HMS Russell	Royal Navy	27 April 1916	A Duncan-class predreadnought battleship that was sunk by mines laid by U-73	35°54′N 14°36′E
S 31	Kriegsmarine	10 May 1942	A German E-boat that was sunk by a mine (probably laid by herself or another E-boat).	35.8900°N 14.5700°E
S-	Royal Navy	August 1947	One of six captured German E-boats that were scuttled off Marsaxlokk.	
St. Angelo	Royal Navy	30 May 1942	A British Admiralty tugboat that struck a naval mine off Grand Harbour.	35.9046°N 14.5423°E
St. Michael	Malta	16 May 1998	A Tanac type tugboat that was decommissioned and scuttled as an artificial reef.	35.8658°N 14.5760°E
HMS Southwold	Royal Navy	24 March 1942	A Hunt-class destroyer that hit a naval mine and sunk shortly after the Second Battle of Sirte.	35°53′N 14°35′E
HMS Stubborn	Royal Navy	30 April 1946	An S-class submarine that was sunk as a target.	35°58.962′N 14°26.773′E
Tug No. 2	Malta	20 June 2013	A tugboat that was decommissioned and scuttled as an artificial reef.	35.9205°N 14.4988°E
Tug No. 10	Malta	16 May 1998	A Melita type tugboat that was decommissioned and scuttled as an artificial reef.	35.8658°N 14.5750°E
Um El Faroud	Libya	2 September 1998	A Libyan oil tanker that suffered an internal explosion on 3 February 1995, and remained at Valletta for three years before being scuttled as an artificial reef.	35°49.20′N 14°27.04′E
X127	United Kingdom	6 March 1942	A fuel lighter that was sunk by German or Italian aircraft at Manoel Island.	35.904°N 14.502°E
Xlendi	Malta	12 November 1999	A Gozo ferry that was decommissioned and scuttled as an artificial reef.	36.0163°N 14.2849°E

== Montenegro ==
Ship	Flag	Sunk date	Notes	Coordinates
Fresnel	France	5 December 1915	Fresnel was one of 18 Pluviôse-class submarines built for the French Navy (Marine Nationale) in the first decade of the 20th century. In 1915, while on close blockade duty off Cattaro, Fresnel was detected and pursued by Austrian warships and aircraft. She was driven aground at the mouth of the Bojana river near Ulcinj, scuttled and abandoned.	
Skanderbeg	Italy	12 February 1942	A paddle steamer that was confiscated by the occupying Italians during World War II, then seized and scuttled in Lake Skadar by members of the Yugoslav Partisans.	

== The Netherlands ==
Ship	Flag	Sunk date	Notes	Coordinates
Aqueity	United Kingdom	11 November 1947	A tanker that struck a naval mine off Terschelling.	53°32′N 05°02′E
Berlin	United Kingdom	20 February 1907	A ferry that was sunk near Hook of Holland during a storm.	
Christiaan Huygens	Netherlands	26 August 1945	A troopship that struck a naval mine and was beached at the Zuid-Steenbank.	
HMS E47	Royal Navy	20 August 1917	An E-class submarine that was sunk about 6 nautical miles (11 km) northwest of Texel.	53°6′8.10″N 4°33′28.0″E
Hertha Engeline Fritzen	Germany	26 October 1941	A steamship that ran aground near the Nieuwe Waterweg.	
HNLMS Johan Maurits van Nassau	Royal Netherlands Navy	14 May 1940	A sloop-of-war that was sunk by German aircraft off Zijpe.	52°50′13″N 4°33′56″E
Katowice	Poland	1949	A Polish cargo ship sunk near Terschelling during a storm.	
HMS Lutine	Royal Navy	9 October 1799	A Magicienne-class frigate that ran aground on a sandbank off Terschelling with a large cargo of gold.	
Palmwood shipwreck		1650–1660	Discovered in 2009 off Texel in the Wadden Sea	
Rotterdam	Netherlands	26 September 1883	A passenger ship that ran aground off Haamstede.	51°41′08″N 3°36′50″E
Thasos	Germany	24 October 1895	A cargo ship that foundered near Terschelling.	
U-7	Imperial German Navy	21 January 1915	A Type U 5 U-boat that was sunk by friendly fire from U-22.	53°25′48″N 6°12′00″E
UB-61	Imperial German Navy	29 November 1917	A Type UB III U-boat that was sunk by a mine off Vlieland.	53°20′N 4°56′E
UC-10	Imperial German Navy	21 August 1916	A Type UC I U-boat that was torpedoed by HMS E54.	52°02′N 03°54′E
't Vliegend Hert	Dutch East India Company	3 February 1735	A Dutch East Indiaman that was lost after striking a sand bank off the coast of Vlissingen, Zeeland. Everyone of the 461 sailors, soldiers and merchants aboard perished. The wreck was discovered in late 1981.	

== Norway ==
Ship	Flag	Sunk date	Notes	Coordinates
Akerendam	Dutch East India Company	8 March 1725	A Dutch East India Company ship that sank in a storm off Runde. In 1972, 57,000 gold and silver coins were recovered from the wreck.	
Atheltemplar	United Kingdom	14 September 1942	A tanker that was torpedoed by U-457 southwest of Bear Island.	76°00′N 18°00′E
Barøy	Norway	13 September 1941	A cargo liner that sunk by British aircraft about 2 nautical miles (3.7 km) west of Tranøy Lighthouse.	
HMS Bittern	Royal Navy	30 April 1940	A Bittern-class sloop that was sunk by German aircraft at Namsos.	64°28′N 11°30′E
Blaafjeld	Norway	4 May 1940	A Norwegian steamship that was bombed during World War II at Rørvik.	
Blücher	Kriegsmarine	9 April 1940	An Admiral Hipper-class heavy cruiser that was sunk at the Battle of Drøbak Sound.	59°42′N 10°35.5′E
USS Cochino	United States Navy	26 August 1949	A Balao-class submarine that caught fire and sank off Hammerfest.	71°35′N 23°35′E
HMS Curlew	Royal Navy	26 May 1940	A C-class cruiser that was sunk by German aircraft in the Ofotfjord.	68.559°N 16.558°E
Den Haabefulde Tronfølger	Norway	29 September 1780	A merchant ship traveling from Bordeaux, France that was caught in a storm and sank south of Arendal.	
Dresden	Germany	20 June 1934	A German steamer stranded 20 nautical miles (37 km) from Haugesund near Blikshavn on the island of Karmøy, whilst undertaking a cruise.	59°12′07″N 05°19′08″E
Dronning Maud	Norway	1 May 1940	A troopship that was sunk by German aircraft near Gratangen.	68°41.917′N 017°26.367′E
HMS Effingham	Royal Navy	18 May 1940	A Hawkins-class heavy cruiser that struck a rock near Bodø and was scuttled.	
HNoMS Eidsvold	Royal Norwegian Navy	9 April 1940	An Eidsvold-class coastal defence ship that was torpedoed by German destroyers at Narvik.	
Fernedale	Germany	16 December 1944	A German World War II freighter that ran aground. Next morning Allied aircraft discovered the ship(s) and destroyed them. Twin wreck of Parat.	61.154°N 5.017833°E
HNoMS Frøya	Royal Norwegian Navy	13 April 1940	A minelayer that was scuttled while under attack from German forces in the Stjørnfjord.	
HNoMS Garm	Royal Norwegian Navy	26 April 1940	A Draug-class destroyer that was sunk by German aircraft.	61°04′41″N 5°49′55″E
Gaul	United Kingdom	February 1974	A deep-sea trawler sunk in the Barents Sea.	
ORP Grom	Polish Navy	4 May 1940	A Grom-class destroyer that was bombed by German aircraft in Rombaken.	
Haakon Jarl II	Norway	17 June 1924	An iron steamship sunk in the Vestfjorden following collision with another ship.	
Hamburg	Germany	1 March 1941	A German fish factory transport ship sunk by a British destroyer in Lofoten.	
HMS Hardy	Royal Navy	10 April 1940	An H-class destroyer that was attacked by German destroyers and ran aground at Vidrek.	68°24′N 17°12′E
Henry	Norway	13 February 1944	A civilian cargo ship that was sunk by a Royal Norwegian Navy torpedo boat off Kristiansund.	
HMS Hunter	Royal Navy	10 April 1940	An H-class destroyer that was sunk by German destroyers in the First Battle of Narvik.	68°24′53″N 17°10′22″E
Irma	Norway	13 February 1944	A civilian cargo liner that was sunk by a Royal Norwegian Navy torpedo boat off Kristiansund.	49°29′N 5°42′W
Karlsruhe	Kriegsmarine	9 April 1940	A Königsberg-class light cruiser that was torpedoed by HMS Truant and scuttled off Kristiansand.	58°4′N 8°4′E
HDMS Lossen	Denmark-Norway	25 December 1717	A frigate wrecked off Hvaler in the Christmas flood of 1717.	
Malmberget	Unknown	28 November 1913		
Martti Ragnar	Finland	22 September 1939	A cargo ship that was sunk by U-4 in Skagerrak.	58°24′N 8°48′E
Murmansk	Russian Navy	24 December 1994	Soviet-era cruiser, grounded while being towed to India for scrapping.	70.636024°N 21.956681°E
Nerva	Norway	7 September 1943	A Norwegian steamship that grounded during WWII at Rørvik.	
Nordnorge	Kriegsmarine	10 May 1940	A troopship that was sunk by British warships at Hemnesberget.	
HNoMS Norge	Royal Norwegian Navy	9 April 1940	An Eidsvold-class coastal defence ship that was sunk by the Z11 Bernd von Arnim at Narvik.	
USS O-12	United States Navy	20 November 1931	An O-class submarine that was used for an Arctic expedition and was later scuttled in Byfjorden.	
HMS Oxley	Royal Navy	10 September 1939	An Odin-class submarine that was sunk by friendly fire from HMS Triton.	58°30′N 5°30′E
Palatia	Kriegsmarine	21 October 1942	A cargo liner that was sunk by a New Zealand torpedo bomber aircraft, killing 986 people, most of them prisoners of war.	57°58.1′N 07°14′E
Parat		16 December 1944	A rescuing steamer that was called into help by Fernedale. Allied aircraft discovered the ships and destroyed them. Twin wreck of Fernedale.	61.154°N 5.017833°E
Prins Olav	Royal Norwegian Navy	9 June 1940	A passenger/cargo ship that sunk by German aircraft in the Norwegian Sea whilst carrying troops.	67°07′N 01°00′E
Rigel	Germany	27 November 1944	A prisoner-of-war transport that was sunk by Supermarine Seafire fighters and Fairey Firefly dive-bombers from the Royal Navy aircraft carrier HMS Implacable, south of Sandnessjøen, with 2,572 deaths.	65°49′16″N 12°20′10″E
HNoMS Sæl	Royal Norwegian Navy	18 April 1940	A 1.-class torpedo boat that was sunk in action with German warships in the Hardangerfjord	
Sanct Svithun	Norway	30 September 1943	A steamship that was sunk by six Bristol Beaufighters aircraft from the Canadian 404 Squadron off the islet of Buholmen.	
Scharnhorst	Kriegsmarine	26 December 1943	A Scharnhorst-class battleship sunk in the Battle of North Cape.	72°16′N 28°41′E
Seattle	Germany	13 April 1940	A cargo ship that was damaged in crossfire and sunk at Dvergsnestangen.	
Sekstant	Norway	4 May 1940	A Norwegian steamship that was bombed during World War II at Rørvik.	
Sirius	Norway	18 May 1940	A cargo ship that was sunk by a German bomber aircraft off Dyrøya.	
HNoMS Stegg	Royal Norwegian Navy	20 April 1940	A Trygg-class torpedo boat that was sunk in action with German warships in the Hardangerfjord	
HNoMS Storm	Royal Norwegian Navy	13 April 1940	A 1.-class torpedo boat that ran aground and sank in Hordaland	
HMS Thistle	Royal Navy	10 April 1940	A T-class submarine that was torpedoed by U-4 off Stavanger.	59°00′N 05°00′E
Tirpitz	Kriegsmarine	12 November 1944	A Bismarck-class battleship that was sunk by British aircraft off Tromsø in Operation Catechism.	
U-6	Imperial German Navy	15 September 1915	A Type U 5 U-boat that was torpedoed by HMS E16 off Stavanger.	58°55′N 5°10′E
U-49	Kriegsmarine	15 April 1940	A Type VIIB U-boat that was sunk by HMS Fearless and HMS Brazen near Harstad.	68°53′N 16°59′E
U-622	Kriegsmarine	24 July 1943	A Type VIIC U-boat that was sunk by US aircraft at Trondheim.	63°27′N 10°23′E
U-711	Kriegsmarine	4 May 1945	A Type VIIC U-boat that was sunk by British aircraft off Harstad during Operation Judgement.	68°48′N 16°38′E
U-737	Kriegsmarine	19 December 1944	A Type VIIC U-boat that collided with German depot ship MRS 25 in the Vestfjorden.	
U-864	Kriegsmarine	9 February 1945	A Type IXD2 U-boat that was scuttled by HMS Venturer while on a logistics mission to Japan.	60°46′10″N 4°37′15″E
HNoMS Uredd	Royal Norwegian Navy	24 February 1943	A U-class submarine that ran into a minefield southwest of Fugløyvær.	67°5′N 13°31′E
Z2 Georg Thiele	Kriegsmarine	13 April 1940	A Type 1934 destroyer that was run aground in the Second Naval Battle of Narvik.	68°24′N 17°35′E
Z9 Wolfgang Zenker	Kriegsmarine	13 April 1940	A Type 1934A destroyer that was scuttled in the Second Naval Battle of Narvik.	
Z11 Bernd von Arnim	Kriegsmarine	13 April 1940	A Type 1934A destroyer that was scuttled in the Second Naval Battle of Narvik.	
Z12 Erich Giese	Kriegsmarine	13 April 1940	A Type 1934A destroyer that was sunk by British ships in the Second Naval Battle of Narvik.	
Z13 Erich Koellner	Kriegsmarine	13 April 1940	A Type 1934A destroyer that was scuttled in the Second Naval Battle of Narvik.	
Z17 Diether von Roeder	Kriegsmarine	13 April 1940	A Type 1936 destroyer that was scuttled in the Second Naval Battle of Narvik.	
Z18 Hans Lüdemann	Kriegsmarine	13 April 1940	A Type 1936 destroyer that was scuttled in the Second Naval Battle of Narvik.	
Z19 Hermann Künne	Kriegsmarine	13 April 1940	A Type 1936 destroyer that was scuttled in the Second Naval Battle of Narvik.	
Z21 Wilhelm Heidkamp	Kriegsmarine	11 April 1940	A Type 1936 destroyer that was sunk in the First Naval Battle of Narvik.	
Z22 Anton Schmitt	Kriegsmarine	11 April 1940	A Type 1936 destroyer that was sunk in the First Naval Battle of Narvik.	

== Poland ==
Ship	Flag	Sunk date	Notes	Coordinates
General von Steuben	Germany	10 February 1945	A German luxury passenger liner turned armoured transport ship that was torpedoed and sunk by S-13.	54°41′N 16°51′E
Graf Zeppelin	Soviet Navy	16 August 1947	Germany's only aircraft carrier in World War II, scuttled after the war by the Soviet Navy.	55°31′03″N 18°17′09″E
U-670	Kriegsmarine	20 August 1943	A Type VIIC U-boat that sank in a collision with Bolkoburg in Gdańsk Bay.	54°50′N 19°15′E
U-854	Kriegsmarine	4 February 1944	A Type IXC/40 U-boat that struck a naval mine north of Świnoujście.	54°1′N 14°16′E
Wilhelm Gustloff	Germany	30 January 1945	A passenger ship on a rescue mission torpedoed and sunk by S-13 in the Baltic Sea. Over 9,000 people were killed.	55.0729°N 17.4213°E

== Portugal ==
Ship	Flag	Sunk date	Notes	Coordinates
Andrios	United Kingdom	20 November 1926	A cargo ship that ran aground off the Berlengas Islands.	
HMS Apollo	Royal Navy	2 April 1804	An Apollo-class frigate that ran aground 9 nautical miles (17 km) south of Cape Mondego.	
Cais do Sodré shipwreck		16th century	Found in Lisbon in April 1995, during the excavation of a subway station.	
Maria Grecia	Portugal	Unknown	A freight vessel sunk off the coast of Sesimbra, in the early 20th century.	
Numancia	Spanish Navy	17 December 1916	A decommissioned coastal defense ship, a former armoured frigate, that was wrecked on rocks near Sesimbra during a gale while under tow to the scrapyard.	
The Pepper Wreck	Portuguese East India Company	14 September 1606	A Portuguese Indiaman found at the mouth of the Tagus.	
Pimpao de Odemira	Portugal	18 May 1904	A Portuguese freight vessel sank off the coast of Cabo Espichel.	
River Gurara	Nigeria	1989	A Nigerian freight vessel sank off the coast of Cabo Espichel, Setubal.	
Run'her	Confederate States of America	1863	A Confederate steamship that sank in the Angra do Heroísmo Bay.	
San Pedro de Alcantara	Spanish Navy	2 February 1786	A man-of-war that sank near Peniche with a cargo of treasure.	
Suffren	French Navy	26 November 1916	A République-class battleship that was torpedoed by U-52 off Lisbon.	39°10′N 10°48′W
U-1277	Kriegsmarine	3 June 1945	A Type VIIC/41 U-boat that was scuttled off Porto.	41°09′N 08°41′W
Woodham	United Kingdom	9 December 1876	A British steamboat sunk off the coast of Lisbon.	
Unknown		Between 1575 and 1625	A ship sunk off the coast of Cascais, carrying Chinese ceramics, pepper and cowries.	

== Romania ==
Ship	Flag	Sunk date	Notes	Coordinates
Akra Aktion	Greece	19 February 1981	A Greek cargo ship, ran ashore at Vama Veche. The crew was saved but the ship remained on the spot. For many years, it remained visible above the water, but decayed over time due to rust and waves. The shipwreck is now completely under the water.	
E Evangelia	Greece	15 October 1968	A Greek freighter, grounded off Costinesti; part of an insurance fraud.	
Shch-213	Soviet Navy	14 October 1942	A Shchuka-class submarine that struck a mine 6 nautical miles (11 km) from Constanta.	

== Russia ==
Ship	Flag	Sunk date	Notes	Coordinates
Admiral Nakhimov	Soviet Union	31 August 1986	An ocean liner that collided with Pyotr Vasev in Tsemes Bay.	44°36′15″N 37°52′35″E
Agnes Blaikie	United Kingdom	5 May 1855	A British sailing vessel sunk in a collision with HMS Medina in the Black Sea near Balaklava.	
Armenia	Soviet Union	7 November 1941	A Soviet hospital ship sunk by German torpedo-carrying aircraft; estimated over 5,000 casualties.	44°15′N 34°17′E
HMS Bluebell	Royal Navy	17 February 1945	A Flower-class corvette that was torpedoed by U-711 in the Kola Inlet.	69°24′N 33°42′E
Bulgaria	Russia	10 July 2011	A Russian cruise ship lost in a storm on the Volga River.	55.063°N 49.152°E
HMS Denbigh Castle	Royal Navy	13 February 1945	A Castle-class corvette that was torpedoed by U-992 and sank under tow in the Kola Inlet.	69°20′N 33°33′E
USS Herndon	United States Navy	16 January 1945	A Clemson-class destroyer that was sunk off the Murman Coast.	69°15′N 37°2′E
K-27	Soviet Navy	6 September 1982	Soviet submarine scuttled in the Kara Sea by the Soviet Navy. The boat had suffered irreparable nuclear reactor plant damage at sea in 1968. Both nuclear reactors are still on board.	72°31′N 55°30′E
K-159	Russian Navy	30 August 2003	A Soviet-era submarine that accidentally sank while being towed for scrapping in the Barents Sea. She was decommissioned in 1989, prior to sinking, but both of her nuclear reactors are still on board.	69°22.64′N 33°49.51′E
HMS Matabele	Royal Navy	17 January 1942	A Tribal-class destroyer that was torpedoed by U-454 off Teriberka.	69°21′N 35°27′E
Revoljucija	Soviet Union	3 December 1944	A cargo ship that was torpedoed by U-1163 near Semiostrovskiy Reid.	68°44′N 37°49′E
U-286	Kriegsmarine	29 April 1945	A Type VIIC U-boat that was sunk by three British frigates north of Murmansk.	69°29′N 33°37′E
U-763	Kriegsmarine	26 January 1945	A Type VIIC U-boat that was scuttled at Königsberg (now Kaliningrad) after taking damage in a Soviet air raid.	54°42′N 20°32′E

== Spain ==
Ship	Flag	Sunk date	Notes	Coordinates
Alfonso XIII	Spanish Republican Navy	30 April 1937	An España-class battleship sunk by a naval mine off Santander.	43°31′26″N 3°40′44″W
Bajo la Campana Phoenician shipwreck	Phoenicia	Seventh century BC	A Phoenician trade ship suken in the seventh century BC a short distance from Cartagena, Spain. Excavated as of 2006.	37.73628°N 0.69174°W
HMS Britannia	Royal Navy	9 November 1918	A King Edward VII-class battleship that was torpedoed by UB-50 off Cape Trafalgar.	35°53′N 5°53′W
C-3	Spanish Republican Navy	12 December 1936	A Spanish C-class submarine that was torpedoed by U-34 about 4 nautical miles (7.4 km) southeast of Málaga.	36°40′N 4°21′W
HMS Captain	Royal Navy	6 September 1870	A warship that capsized in a storm off Cape Finisterre.	
Cason	Panama	5 December 1987	A cargo ship that caught fire and was grounded off Cape Finisterre.	
RMS Douro	United Kingdom	1 April 1882	A Royal Mail Ship that sank off the coast of Cape Finisterre after colliding with the Spanish steamship Yrurac Bat.	
Duchess of York	United Kingdom	12 July 1943	A UK troopship sunk by UK torpedoes after German aerial bombardment left her burning.	41°15′N 15°24′W
HMS Egret	Royal Navy	27 August 1943	An Egret-class sloop sunk by enemy aircraft near Vigo.	42°10′N 9°22′W
USS Jallao	United States Navy	1985	A Balao-class submarine that was scuttled off Cartagena.	38.05°N 133.2°E
K-8	Soviet Navy	12 April 1970	A November-class submarine that caught fire and sank while being towed in the Bay of Biscay. Four nuclear warheads and two nuclear reactors are still on board.	
Neptuno	Spanish Navy	23 October 1805	A Spanish Montañés-class ship of the line wrecked in the Bay of Cádiz.	
Neretva	Croatia	13 August 1992	A merchant ship that sank off Ribadesella. It lies on sand at a depth of 50 metres (160 ft).	43°29′02.16″N 5°00′57.67″W
Prestige	Bahamas	19 November 2002	An oil tanker that sank off Galicia.	42°53′N 9°53′W
Sirio	Italy	4 August 1906	An Italian merchant steamship which ran aground on a reef off Cape Palos and the Hormigas Islands off the Spanish coast, killing hundreds of migrants to Argentina.	37°39′6.73″N 0°39′10.31″W
U-77	Kriegsmarine	28 March 1943	A German Type VIIC U-boat sunk off Cartagena.	37°42′N 00°10′E
U-106	Kriegsmarine	2 August 1943	A German Type IXB U-boat sunk by enemy aircraft off Cape Ortegal.	46°35′N 11°55′W
U-138	Kriegsmarine	18 June 1941	A German Type IID U-boat sunk by depth charges off Cádiz.	
U-751	Kriegsmarine	17 July 1942	A German Type VIIC U-boat sunk by depth charges off Cape Ortegal.	
U-755	Kriegsmarine	28 May 1943	A German Type VIIC U-boat sunk off Isla de Alborán.	
Yrurac Bat	Spain	1 April 1882	A Spanish steamship that sank off the coast of Cape Finisterre after colliding with RMS Douro.	

== Slovenia ==
Ship	Flag	Sunk date	Notes	Coordinates
Rex	Italy	8 September 1944	An Italian liner that sank near Koper after being hit by rockets fired by Royal Air Force aircraft.	45°32′56″N 13°41′31″E

== Sweden ==
Ship	Flag	Sunk date	Notes	Coordinates
August Helmerich	Germany	30 September 1919	A cargo ship that collided with Normandie off Dalarö.	
Dalarö wreck	Unknown	17th century	A shipwreck discovered in 2003 off Dalarö.	
Finnbirch	Sweden	1 November 2006	A RORO ferry that capsized in a storm.	56°45′03″N 17°15′06″E
Gribshunden	Denmark	1495	Warship discovered in the 1970s, one of the best-preserved wrecks from the late medieval period.	56°8′41.2″N 15°13′15.3″E
Herakles	Sweden	2 March 2004	A towboat that foundered in heavy weather and was wrecked near Grundkallen.	
I P Suhr	Denmark	1 December 1950	A cargo ship that capsized 5 nautical miles (9.3 km) off Sandhammaren.	
Kronan	Swedish Navy	1 June 1676	The largest warship in the Swedish navy during the Scanian War. It sank in rough weather in the Battle of Öland, and was rediscovered in 1980.	56°26′58″N 16°40′20″E
Luleå Northern Harbour Wreck	Unknown	c1700	A wreck in Luleå Northern Harbour measuring 7 metres (23 ft) by 20 metres (66 ft) made from wood dated to approximately 1700. Discovered during the Sailing World Cup held in Luleå in 1988 and dated in 2011.	
Mars	Swedish Navy	31 May 1564	A Swedish warship that was sunk 18 kilometres (11 mi) north of Öland during the Northern Seven Years' War.	
S-2	Soviet Navy	2 January 1940	A Soviet S-class submarine that hit a naval mine west of Åland.	
S-7	Soviet Navy	21 October 1942	A Soviet S-class submarine that was torpedoed by Vesihiisi off Stockholm.	59°51′N 19°32′E
Som	Swedish Navy	10 May 1916	A Som-class submarine that sank in a collision in the Sea of Åland.	60°00′N 18°56′E
Swiks	Åland	21 December 1926	A three-masted schooner, built 1902, that sank in a storm off the coast of Öland.	
Vasa	Swedish Navy	10 August 1628	A Swedish warship that foundered on her maiden voyage and sank in Stockholm.	59°19′40″N 18°05′28″E
Westfalen	Kriegsmarine	7 September 1944	A prisoner transport that was sunk by a naval mine off Marstrand.	57.7797°N 11.4561°E

== Ukraine ==
Ship	Flag	Sunk date	Notes	Coordinates
Moskva	Russian Navy	14 April 2022	A Slava-class cruiser that was hit by two Neptune missiles fired by Ukrainians in the Russo-Ukrainian War 80 nautical miles (150 km) south of Odesa.	45°10′43″N 30°55′31″E
Novorossiysk	Soviet Navy	29 October 1955	A Conte di Cavour-class battleship that exploded in Sevastopol Bay, resulting in 608 deaths.	44°37′7″N 33°32′8″E
Saturn	Russian Navy	6 June 2024	Attacked and sunk by Ukrainian naval drones	
Sergey Kotov	Russian Navy	5 March 2024	Attacked and sunk by Ukrainian MAGURA V5 unmanned surface vehicles.	Off the coast of Crimea near the Kerch Strait
Spasatel Vasily Bekh	Russian Navy	17 June 2022	A Russian rescue tug, claimed to have been sunk by Ukraine. The sinking was corroborated by British intelligence.	
HMS Tiger	Royal Navy	11 May 1854	A steam frigate that was grounded in the Crimean War 5 nautical miles (9.3 km) southwest of Odesa.	
Tsezar Kunikov	Russian Navy	14 February 2024	Attacked and sunk by Ukrainian MAGURA V5 unmanned surface vehicles.	Crimea
