= U5 =

U5 or U-5 may refer to:

== Biochemistry ==
- U5 spliceosomal RNA
- mtDNA haplogroup U5, within Haplogroup U

== Transport ==
=== Aviation ===
- SkyUp MT (IATA code U5), a Maltese airline subsidiary of SkyUp Airlines
- Karinou Airlines (former IATA code: U5), former airline of the Central African Republic
- USA3000 Airlines (former IATA code: U5), former airline based in Pennsylvania, US

=== Rail ===
- U5 (Berlin U-Bahn), a subway line in Germany
- U5 (Hamburg U-Bahn), a subway line in Germany (under construction as at 2026); see Hamburg U-Bahn
- U5 (Vienna U-Bahn), a subway line in Austria (under construction)
- U-5, a Munich U-Bahn subway line in Germany

=== Road ===
- Aiways U5, a 2019 Chinese electric car model
- Luxgen U5, a 2017 Taiwanese car model
- Utah State Route 5 (disambiguation), one of two American highways
- Beijing U5, a Chinese car
- London Buses route U5

=== Submarines ===
- German submarine U-5, several submarines
  - SM U-5 (Germany), the lead boat of the class
- U-5-class submarine (Austria-Hungary), a class of three built 1908–1911
  - SM U-5 (Austria-Hungary), the class's lead boat

== Other uses ==
- U5, a music partnership between the X5 Music Group and Universal labels
- U5, an unemployment figure released by the United States Bureau of Labor Statistics
- Ultima V: Warriors of Destiny, a 1988 computer role-playing game

== See also ==
- 5U (disambiguation)
- US (disambiguation)
