= Activ =

Activ may refer to:

- Activ (ship), SS Revoljucija 1909
- Activ (band)
- Activ (car), 1.5L model of the Chevrolet Spin
- Activ (company which supplies automotive components including ADAS)

== See also ==
- Activ Solar, Austrian solar company
- Citizens Activ, album by Christian rapper Manafest 2008
- Pilkington Activ, self-cleaning coated float glass product
