= Principessa Jolanda =

Principessa Jolanda may refer to -

People

- Princess Yolanda of Savoy (1901-85)

Ships

- SS Principessa Jolanda, a number of ships with this name
