= German submarine U-5 =

U-5 may refer to one of the following German submarines:

- SM U-5 (Germany), was the lead boat of the Type U 5 submarines; launched in 1910 and served in the First World War until sunk on 18 December 1914
  - During the First World War, Germany also had these submarines with similar names:
    - SM UB-5, a Type UB I submarine launched in 1915 and broken up in 1919
    - SM UC-5, a Type UC I submarine launched in 1915 and grounded on 27 April 1916; the scuttling charges did not go off and the submarine was captured and displayed in London and New York for propaganda purposes
- German submarine U-5 (1935), a Type IIA submarine that served in the Second World War and was sunk on 19 March 1943
- German submarine U-5 (S184), a Type 205 submarine of the Bundesmarine that was launched in 1963 and scrapped in 1974

U-5 or U-V may also refer to:

- SM U-5 (Austria-Hungary), lead boat of the U-5 class for the Austro-Hungarian Navy
