= Dannebroge =

Dannebroge may refer to the following ships:

- HDMS Dannebroge, a ship of the Royal Dano-Norwegian Navy
- Dannebrog (DAC ship), an East Indiaman of the Danish Asiatic Company
- Dannebroge, Danish flagship in the 1801 Battle of Copenhagen

== See also ==
- Dannebrog (disambiguation)
