= 5U =

5U or 5-U may refer to:

- 5U, a rack unit measurement
- 5U, IATA code for LADE (Lineas Aéreas del Estado)
- FS-5U, a footswitch made by Roland Corporation
- CMIT 5 U, a shotgun microphone made by Schoeps

== See also ==
- U5 (disambiguation)
