= HM LST-420 =

Royal Navy tank landing ship of World War II

History

United Kingdom
- Name: LST-420
- Ordered: as a Type S3-M-K2 hull, MCE hull 940
- Builder: Bethlehem-Fairfield Shipyard, Baltimore, Maryland
- Yard number: 2192
- Laid down: 6 November 1942
- Launched: 5 December 1942
- Commissioned: 15 February 1943
- Stricken: 2 June 1945
- Identification: Hull symbol: LST-420
- Fate: Lost in action, 7 November 1944

General characteristics
- Class & type: LST-1-class tank landing ship
- Displacement: 4,080 long tons (4,145 t) full load; 2,160 long tons (2,190 t) landing
- Length: 328 ft (100 m) oa
- Beam: 50 ft (15 m)
- Draught: Full load: 8 ft 2 in (2.49 m) forward; 14 ft 1 in (4.29 m) aft; Landing at 2,160 t: 3 ft 11 in (1.19 m) forward; 9 ft 10 in (3.00 m) aft
- Installed power: 2 × 900 hp (670 kW) Electro-Motive Diesel 12-567A diesel engines; 1,700 shp (1,300 kW)
- Propulsion: 1 × Falk main reduction gears; 2 × Propellers
- Speed: 12 kn (22 km/h; 14 mph)
- Range: 24,000 nmi (44,000 km; 28,000 mi) at 9 kn (17 km/h; 10 mph) while displacing 3,960 long tons (4,024 t)
- Boats & landing craft carried: 2 or 6 x LCVPs
- Capacity: 1,600–1,900 short tons (1,500,000–1,700,000 kg) cargo depending on mission
- Troops: 16 officers, 147 enlisted men
- Complement: 13 officers, 104 enlisted men
- Armament: Varied, ultimate armament; 1 × QF 12-pounder 12 cwt naval gun; 6 × 20 mm (0.79 in) Oerlikon cannon; 4 × Fast Aerial Mine (FAM) mounts

LST-420 was a Royal Navy tank landing ship of World War II, built as a LST-1-class tank landing ship (LST Mk 2) in the US that was transferred to UK. She was lost on 7 November 1944, after hitting a mine in heavy seas off Ostend, Belgium, sinking with great loss of life, particularly amongst her Royal Air Force passengers. It was the greatest loss of life on a British landing craft during World War II.

== Construction ==
LST-420 was laid down on 6 November 1942, under Maritime Commission (MARCOM) contract, MC hull 940, by the Bethlehem-Fairfield Shipyard, Baltimore, Maryland; launched 5 December 1942; then transferred to the United Kingdom and commissioned on 15 February 1943.

== Service ==
She was a purpose designed "tank landing ship" capable of transporting vehicles and personnel to anywhere in the world. She had served in the Mediterranean and in Invasion of Normandy. From 20 July 1944, she was commanded by Lieutenant Commander Douglas Harold Everett, Royal Navy Reserve, a 30 year old professional Master Mariner serving with the Royal Navy for the duration of the war.

== Background for final operations ==
The weather was very poor and had resulted in a relative lull in aerial fighting in North West Europe. This presented the 2nd Tactical Air Force with an opportunity to conduct necessary servicing, repairs and overhaul of radar installations in North West Europe as "partial downtime" was unavoidable in the process and the defences could not be "down" when the Luftwaffe was active. The process involved taking a radar installation "off line" but leaving the site still functioning on its alternative systems.

All such major maintenance after the D-Day landings on 6 June 1944, until November 1944, had been accomplished by small "Mobile Signals Servicing Units" (MSSU) which had been enormously successful. The tactical plan was for the "No. 1 Base Signals and Radar Unit" (BSRU), which had completed eighteen months training at the Signals Battle Training School, to land in France once the Normandy bridgehead was sufficiently stable but due to the MSSU's success and the greater rate of territorial advance than expected, the BSRU had been held in England until a more suitable time.

After meetings at the Air Ministry in London and the 2nd Tactical Air Force HQ in North West Europe, it was decided to move the unit, its vehicles and personnel to a site at Ghent, Belgium where workshops were set up and equipment began to arrive. On receipt of movement orders in the marshalling area in Essex, the 303 men of the unit began boarding LST-420 which took aboard 19 officers and 250 personnel of No. 1 BSRU (some sources say 263 officers and men) with their 50 vehicles, equipment and supplies, the remaining officer and 33 men boarded another LST with several of their vehicles.

== Loss ==
On 7 November 1944, a small convoy of vessels comprising LST-200, LST-320, LST-367, LST-405 and LST-420 crossed the English Channel bound for Ostend, Belgium. The weather had been very poor for a week and a severe storm was rising. By mid-afternoon when they arrived off the Belgian coast conditions were terrible, and as a result they were refused permission to enter port at Ostend due to concerns that an accident in the harbourmouth might cause considerable disruption in the supply line for land forces. The convoy duly altered course back towards England planning to shelter overnight in the Thames Estuary before returning to Ostend on the following day.

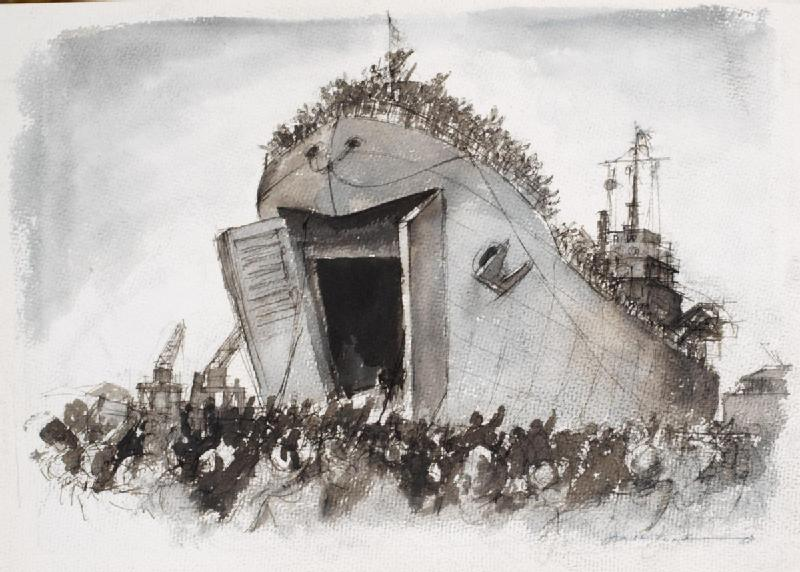
an LST with its bow doors open to disembark passengers and cargo

At approximately 15:00, within sight of Ostend the bow section of LST-420 struck a German mine which tore a large hole in the ship's hull causing it to break into two parts. The ship's galley fires were lit at the time due to the evening meal being prepared and gallons of petrol from the damaged fuel tanks of the vehicles caught fire enveloping the stern section of the ship in flame. LST-420 sank very rapidly and due to the heavy seas only larger vessels were able to attempt to rescue survivors in the water. Only 31 or 32 men of the BSRU were saved from life rafts.

The position of the wreck is recorded as 51°15.033′N 2°41.798′E. A section of the bow of LST-420 was raised in 1990. A yellow marker buoy is located above the wreck today.

== Casualties ==
- Crew - Lieutenant-Commander Douglas Everett, and 54 other members of the crew of LST-420 were lost that night. (4 are buried in Belgium, 1 was washed ashore in England and was taken home for burial by his family. The other members of the crew are commemorated on the Naval Memorials at Plymouth, Chatham and the Royal New Zealand Naval Memorial).

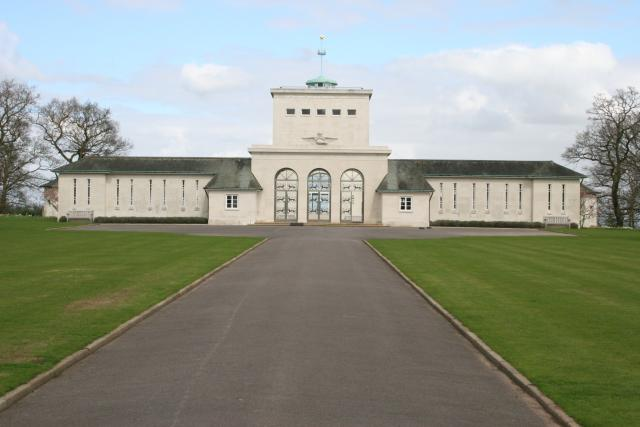
Runnymede Memorial where at least 136 of the casualties of LST-420 are commemorated

- Royal Air Force – At least 232 members of the Royal Air Force and 5 members of the Royal Canadian Air Force died in the sinking, they were 14 officers, 3 warrant officers, 31 flight sergeants and sergeants and 189 junior ranks. The dead are buried mainly at Ostend and Blankenberge but as far north as Kiel in Germany. Those without graves are commemorated on the Runnymede Memorial. The majority were members of "No.1 BSRU".
- Other passengers – it is possible that 12 members of No. 335 Provost Company, "Corps of Military Police" Royal Military Police, 5 members of No. 111 General Hospital, Royal Army Medical Corps, 9 members of Royal Army Service Corps and several other British Army personnel were also lost aboard LST-420.

At least 292 persons were killed, with the total loss of life probably being over 320. (Note: Calculations based on the records of the Commonwealth War Graves Commission coupled with the "Armed Forces Register" of the General Register Office of England & Wales and Scotland and records held on the "Air of Authority" website.) The dead were washed ashore as far north as the north German coast, on the beaches of the Netherlands, Belgium, England and as far south as Calais, France.

== See also ==
- List of United States Navy LSTs

== Bibliography ==
Online resources

- "LST-420". Dictionary of American Naval Fighting Ships. Naval History and Heritage Command. This article incorporates text from this source, which is in the public domain.
- "Bethlehem-Fairfield, Baltimore MD". www.ShipbuildingHistory.com. 14 August 2008.
- "USS LST-420". NavSource. 29 May 2009.
- Wolf, Grey (2013). "Storm Damage". Ystalyfera History.
- Smoothy, Peter. "Account of the Sinking of HM LST-420". NavSource.
- Helgason, Guðmundur. "HMS LST-420". German U-boats of WWII - uboat.net.
