= Semiostrovskiy Reid =

Strait in the Kola Peninsula, Russia

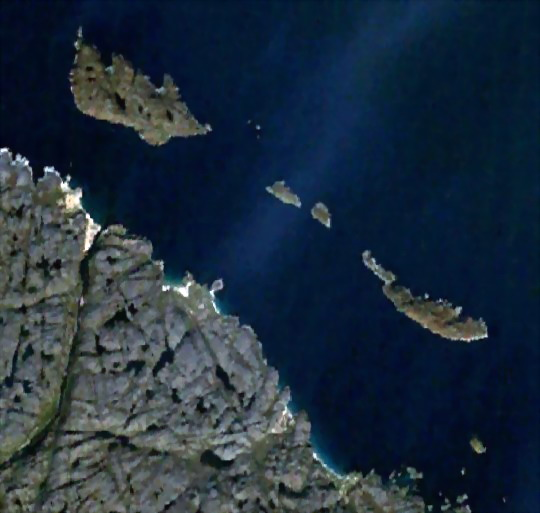
Semiostrovskiy Reid from space

Semiostrovskiy Reid (Russian: Семиостровский Рейд) is a strait, located at 68°46′44″N 37°24′35″E, separating the islands Sem Ostrovov and the Kola Peninsula, Russia.

== Sources ==
- Map of strait
