= Dalarö wreck =

17th century shipwreck off Sweden

Coordinates: 59°9′N 18°28′E

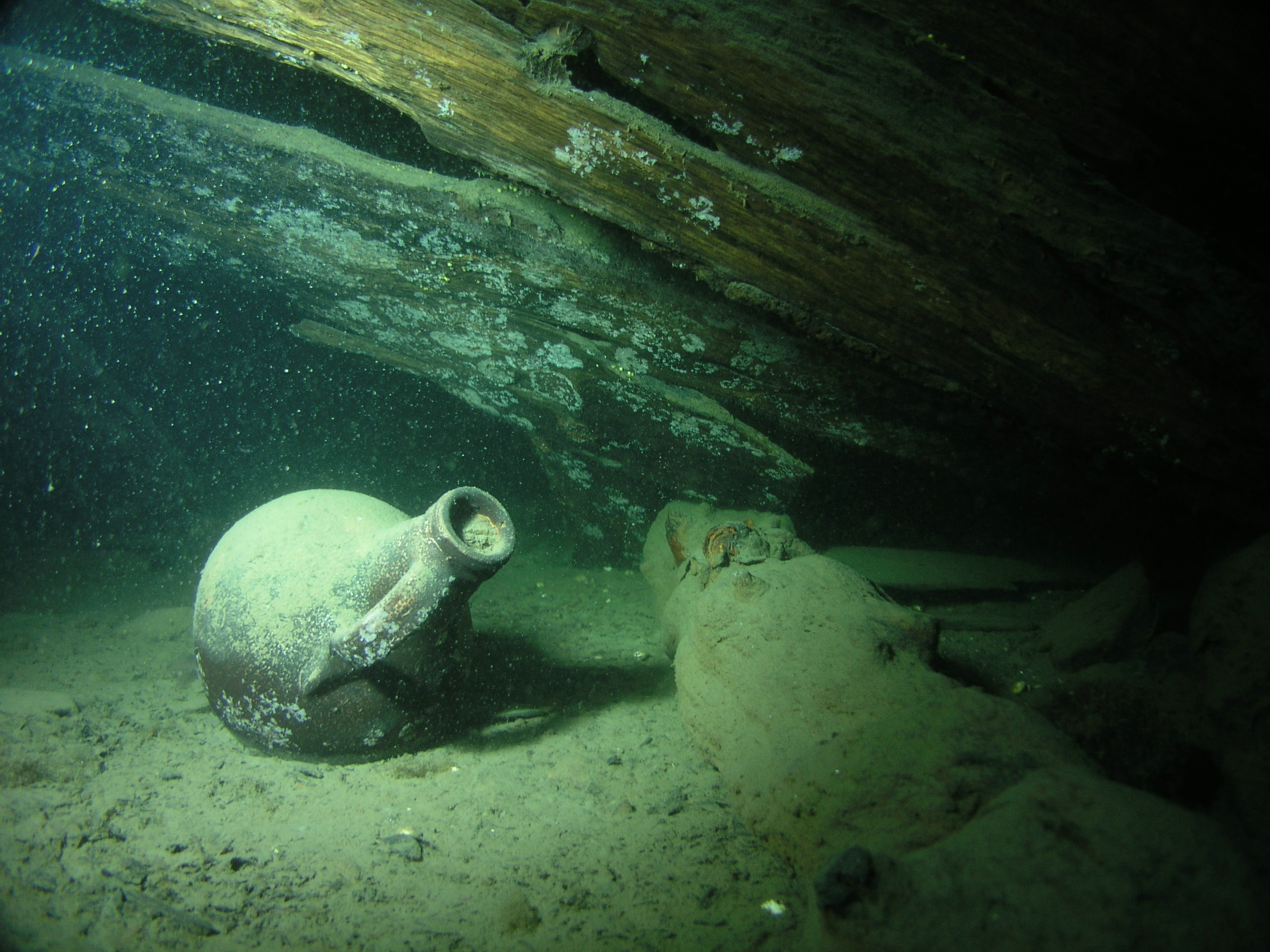
A Bartmann jug found on the site of the Dalarö-wreck

The Dalarö wreck (also known as the Edesö wreck) is a shipwreck of a 17th-century ship lying in the waters off Edesön near Dalarö, southeast of Stockholm, Sweden. It is the remains of a three-masted armed vessel. It was discovered in 2003 but it was not made public until March 2007.

== History ==
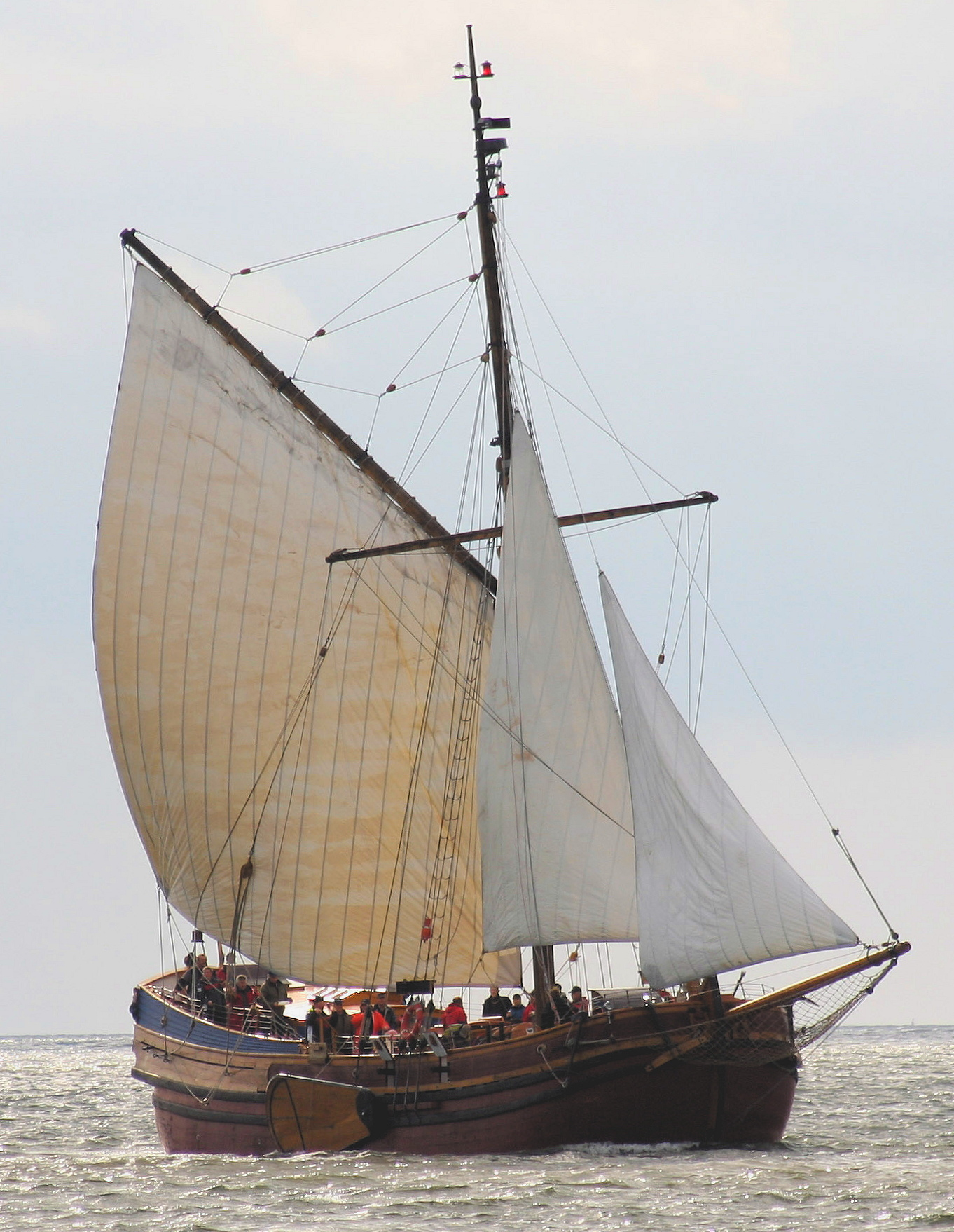
Christine af Bro, a modern Swedish replica of a bojort

It had been suggested that the wreck is the remains of a ship called Krönta Lejonet ("The Crowned Lion") that belonged to Swedish nobleman Magnus Gabriel De la Gardie. This ship disappear from the written sources around 1660. In May 2017 Niklas Eriksson at Stockholm University revealed the original identity of the wreck as the Bodekull of the Swedish Navy. Bodekull was built in 1659-61 and sank in October 1678.

The sculptures associating to the ships name were usually located on the transom in the ship's stern in these days.

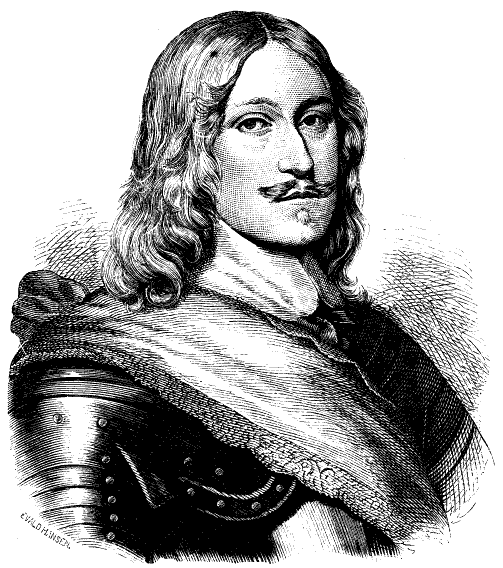
Magnus Gabriel De la Gardie

A glass bottle brought up from the ship bears an impressed crest of the Boynton or Ogle family, who both were based in Northumberland in northern England. Through dendrochronological analysis it has been determined that the timber used for the ship was cut no later than 1628 in Northern Europe, perhaps in Northumberland. A trade route linked Stockholm, Newcastle and Amsterdam in the mid-17th century. In this triangular trade, Swedish brass was exported to England where, among other things, Newcastle coal was taken on. The coal, for which the local market in Stockholm was too small, would have been sold in part at Amsterdam where products like imported wine were loaded for export back to Sweden. When the ship sank it was carrying coal originating from England or Germany and stoneware Bartmann jugs that most likely contained wine. The glass bottle is believed to have been manufactured sometime between 1640 and 1670. One of the Bartmann jugs brought up from the ship for analysis bears the seal of the city of Amsterdam. Though most likely built in England by English shipwrights, it could have been contracted by Swedish or even Dutch owners. Analysis of a pistol found on the weather deck found that it bore close resemblance to a 1683 pistol model manufactured for the Swedish Navy. The wood used for the pistol, though, is walnut, an expensive material in Sweden, making it less likely that it was part of a larger production series.

The wreck lies with 17 degree list to starboard, and objects belonging to the ship that have been found on the sea floor have all been found on the starboard side. The current theory as to how the ship sank is that she was hit by a sudden squall in rough weather, heeled to starboard, took on water and then sank. The base of the windlass attached to the foredeck, a very sturdy construction, seems to have been torn off, which suggest the sinking happened suddenly. The presence of weapons and equipment on the weather deck supports the theory that the sinking occurred suddenly. No remains of the crew have been found.

== Design ==
The ship had three masts, two of which are still standing. The lower masts of both fore- and mainmasts are still standing, whereas the mizzenmast have healed over to starboard. The wreck was originally rigged as a ship, with square sails on fore and mainmasts. The hull is about 20 m long and relatively wide. The stern is round tucked, which might indicate English shipbuilding style, rather than the Dutch. The hull has three gunports along each side. Two guns have been observed at the wrecksite. Due to its manoeuvrability and small size, such a ship would also have been suitable for piracy. The beakhead was adorned with a figurehead in the shape of a lion.

== Archaeology ==
The comparatively cold and brackish waters of the Baltic Sea are free from the "shipworm" Teredo navalis, which rapidly destroys submerged wood in most other seas. This means that the Baltic waters have an exceptional ability to conserve wrecks for hundreds of years, and has left the wooden construction of the Dalarö wreck largely intact. As on the Vasa, metal objects such as bolts have rusted away, but the wooden construction itself remains largely intact.

The wreck has been the object of several investigations by marine archaeologists from the Swedish National Maritime Museum, Södertörn University, the University of Southampton and Stockholm University. Since the hull is intact and the sinking occurred suddenly, the wreck contains a multitude of objects that are interesting to archaeologists and historians. On the top deck there are several interesting finds, both ship equipment and other assorted items, including a musket. Two of the three masts are still standing, and the damaged windlass (used to winch up the anchor) can be clearly seen. There is an intact cabinet containing carpenter's tools, including an axe, a plane and an awl. Of the several cannon with which the ship was once armed only one remains, complete with its gun carriage.

The hold has not been excavated and thoroughly examined, but in it are coal and a large quantity of stoneware Bartmann jugs, probably containing wine destined for the Swedish market. The divers who first located the wreck brought up the glass bottle that bore the crest of the English Boynton or Ogle families, a bowl, a drinking cup and one of the Bartmann jugs. Since the official announcement of the find in 2007, only two further objects have been brought up for analysis. One, the wooden butt of a flintlock pistol, helps date the find. The 1.9 meter-long lion figurehead lying next to the ship was also brought up and recorded in a 3D scanner. Both objects were then returned to their original positions on or near the wreck.

== Discovery and current status ==
The wreck was discovered in 2003 by a group of professional divers, who notified the Swedish National Maritime Museums (SNMM) and showed some objects that were brought up from the wreck, but the find was not made public until 28 March 2007 through a press release from SNMM. The wreck has not been moved from its current location and in order to preserve it, there are no plans to raise it, as was done with the warship Vasa in 1961. The difficulties in preserving the ship are considered by archaeologists to be too expensive and complicated. A salvage operation would also risk damaging the ship and the many related artefacts as well as disturb the site, making it more difficult to conduct further research.

The SNMM in cooperation with Haninge Municipality intend to turn the site of the Dalarö wreck into a wreck-diving park. The objective is to encourage cultural tourism by allowing the public access to the wreck site. Hobby divers are to be allowed to visit the wreck accompanied by licensed guides while non-divers are to be offered trips over the site that are to be enhanced by sonar and underwater cameras.

In May 2008 SNMM revealed that some time between October 2007 and April 2008 the Dalarö wreck site had been disturbed. Some items had been removed while others had been disturbed or damaged. Among the objects that have disappeared so far is the wooden frame of a pistol that was located on the weather deck. The ship is monitored by the coast guard, and the residents of Dalarö have been notified to be wary of attempts to plunder the wreck. As of 2009, objects recorded by archaeologists have disappeared and the wreck has been disturbed and to some extent damaged. Known wreck sites in the Baltic are inevitably plundered, and there have been public appeals to somehow protect the Dalarö wreck. Though illegal, there is little preventing individuals from performing private covert diving operations in order to bring up objects from the ship in order to sell them on the black market.

In 2017 the ship was identified as most likely being the Bodekull which sank in 1678.
