= SM U-73 =

Submarine of the Imperial German Navy

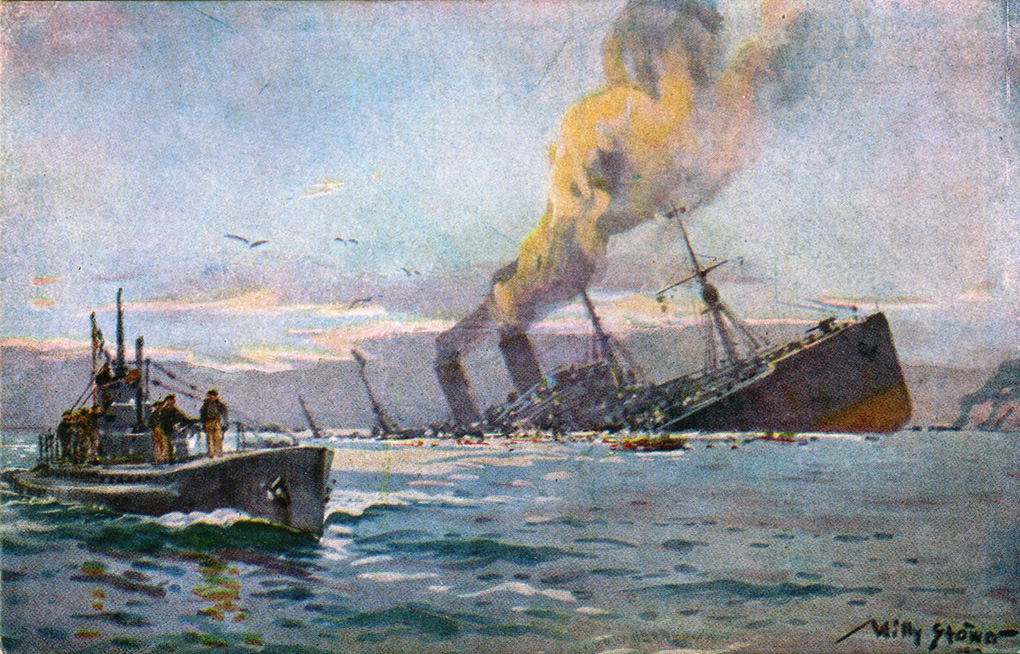
- Willy Stöwer: sinking a troop transport by a German submarine in the Mediterranean, postcard from 1917 - missions such as U-73 offered motifs for marine painters

History

German Empire
- Name: U-73
- Ordered: 6 January 1915
- Builder: Kaiserliche Werft Danzig
- Yard number: 29
- Launched: 16 June 1915
- Commissioned: 9 October 1915
- Fate: Scuttled during the evacuation of Cattaro 30 October 1918 in position 44°52′N 13°50′E

General characteristics
- Class & type: Type UE I submarine
- Displacement: 745 t (733 long tons) surfaced; 829 t (816 long tons) submerged
- Length: 56.80 m (186 ft 4 in) (o/a); 46.66 m (153 ft 1 in) (pressure hull)
- Beam: 5.90 m (19 ft 4 in) (o/a); 5.00 m (16 ft 5 in) (pressure hull)
- Height: 8.25 m (27 ft 1 in)
- Draught: 4.84 m (15 ft 11 in)
- Installed power: 2 × 800 PS (588 kW; 789 shp) surfaced; 2 × 800 PS (588 kW; 789 shp) submerged
- Propulsion: 2 shafts, 2× 1.41 m (4 ft 8 in) propellers
- Speed: 10.6 knots (19.6 km/h; 12.2 mph) surfaced; 7.9 knots (14.6 km/h; 9.1 mph) submerged
- Range: 7,880 nmi (14,590 km; 9,070 mi) at 7 knots (13 km/h; 8.1 mph) surfaced; 83 nmi (154 km; 96 mi) at 4 knots (7.4 km/h; 4.6 mph) submerged
- Test depth: 50 m (164 ft 1 in)
- Complement: 4 officers, 28 enlisted
- Armament: 2 × 50 cm (19.7 in) torpedo tubes (one starboard bow, one starboard stern); 4 torpedoes; 1 × 8.8 cm (3.5 in) SK L/30 deck guns
- Notes: Sunk the 48,158 GRT hospital ship HMHS Britannic.

Service record
- Part of: Pola / Mittelmeer / Mittelmeer II Flotilla; 30 April 1916 – 30 October 1918
- Commanders: Kptlt. Gustav Sieß; 9 October 1915 – 21 May 1917; Kptlt. Ernst von Voigt; 22 May 1917 – 15 January 1918; Kptlt. Karl Meusel; 16 January – 15 June 1918; Oblt. Carl Bünte; 16 June – 15 September 1918; Kptlt. Fritz Saupe; 16 September – 30 October 1918
- Operations: 9 patrols
- Victories: 13 merchant ships sunk (24,483 GRT); 3 warships sunk (28750 tons); 5 auxiliary warships sunk (62,366 GRT); 2 merchant ships damaged (1,749 GRT); 1 auxiliary warship damaged (6,318 GRT)

SM U-73 was one of 329 submarines serving in the Imperial German Navy in World War I. She engaged in the commerce war as part of the First Battle of the Atlantic. U-73 has the distinction of being responsible for laying the underwater mine that later led to the sinking of the largest ship sunk during World War I, the 48,158 ton hospital ship Britannic.

== Operations ==
After completion at Danzig in November 1915, U-73 was commissioned by Kapitänleutnant Gustav Sieß. She joined the Kiel School, where she remained until February 1916, conducting trials and crew training. She then left for the North Sea and was attached to the 1st Half Flotilla. Her activities were monitored throughout the war by Room 40, and most of her recorded movements are based on that information. Her first operational cruise began 1 April 1916, when she left Heligoland Bight, bound for the Mediterranean by way of the North Sea. En route, she attacked one steamer in the Atlantic and laid mines off Lisbon and Malta. On 27 April 1916 she laid a minefield of 22 mines outside the Grand Harbour of Valletta in which four ships were sunk: the battleship HMS Russell; the sloop Nasturtium; HMT Crownsin, sunk 4 May 1916 with the loss of 11 men; and the yacht HMY Aegusa. On arriving in Cattaro on about 1 May (the date is uncertain), U-73 joined the Pola-Cattaro Flotilla.

The minelaying cruises of U-73 in the Mediterranean cannot be reconstructed. The battleship HMS Russell hit two of the mines and sank. On 7 October 1916 she is reported to have left Pola in Croatia, and the French put down to her the mine sunk off Cape Male on 12 October, as well as a minefield in the Gulf of Salonika, and mines in the Gulf of Athens on which two Greek ships were blown up. It seems certain U-73, still commanded by Sieß, laid the mine by which the hospital ship HMHS Britannic (currently the largest passenger ship resting on the seafloor and the largest ship sunk during World War I) was lost, only one hour after U-73 laid the mine. It is possible the hospital ship HMHS Braemar Castle was also damaged by one of her mines. U-73 suffered from constant machinery trouble that was common with her class. At the end of October 1918, now in the hands of Kptlt. Fritz Saupe, she was scuttled at Pola in Croatia.

== Summary of raiding history ==
Date	Name	Nationality	Tonnage (Note: Merchant ship tonnages are in gross register tons. Military vessels are listed by tons displacement.)	Fate
11 April 1916	Inverlyon	United Kingdom	1,827	Sunk
17 April 1916	Terje Viken	Norway	3,579	Sunk
27 April 1916	HMS Nasturtium	Royal Navy	1,250	Sunk
27 April 1916	HMS Russell	Royal Navy	14,000	Sunk
28 April 1916	HMY Aegusa	Royal Navy	1,242	Sunk
4 May 1916	HMT Crownsin	Royal Navy	137	Sunk
3 August 1916	HMS Clacton	Royal Navy	820	Sunk
9 August 1916	Lorenzo Donato	Italy	140	Sunk
24 October 1916	Propontis	Greece	700	Sunk
31 October 1916	Kiki Issaias	Greece	2,993	Sunk
14 November 1916	Burdigala	French Navy	12,009	Sunk
20 November 1916	Spetzai	Greece	788	Damaged
20 November 1916	Sparti	Greece	961	Damaged
21 November 1916	HMHS Britannic	Royal Navy (Note: Initially built for White Star; Requisitioned by Admiralty upon July Crisis in May 1915.)	48,158	Sunk
23 November 1916	HMHS Braemar Castle	Royal Navy	6,318	Damaged
21 December 1916	Murex	United Kingdom	3,564	Sunk
23 December 1916	Thistleban	United Kingdom	4,117	Sunk
4 January 1917	Peresvyet	Imperial Russian Navy	13,500	Sunk
12 March 1917	Bilswood	United Kingdom	3,097	Sunk
29 September 1917	R 235	France	15	Sunk
30 September 1917	Midlothian	United Kingdom	1,321	Sunk
30 September 1917	Nicolosa	Greece	50	Sunk
1 October 1917	Ludovicos	United Kingdom	50	Sunk
19 October 1918	Almerian	United Kingdom	3,030	Sunk

== Bibliography ==
- Gröner, Erich; Jung, Dieter; Maass, Martin (1991). U-boats and Mine Warfare Vessels. German Warships 1815–1945. Vol. 2. Translated by Thomas, Keith; Magowan, Rachel. London: Conway Maritime Press. ISBN 0-85177-593-4.
