= SM U-7 (Germany) =

Type U 5 U-boat

Coordinates: 53°25′48″N 6°02′00″E

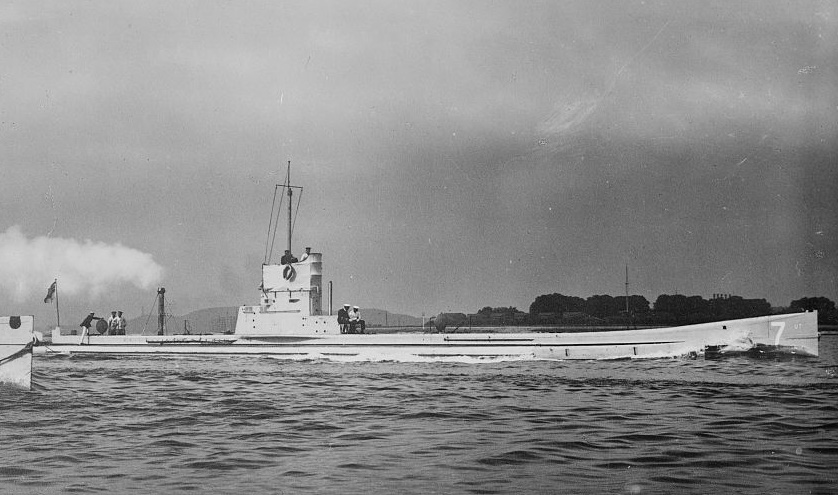

History

German Empire
- Name: U-7
- Ordered: 8 April 1908
- Builder: Germaniawerft, Kiel
- Cost: 2,540,000 Goldmark
- Yard number: 149
- Laid down: 6 May 1909
- Launched: 28 July 1910
- Commissioned: 18 July 1911
- Fate: Sunk in a friendly fire incident, 26 dead.

General characteristics
- Class & type: Type U 5 submarine
- Displacement: 505 t (497 long tons) surfaced; 636 t (626 long tons) submerged
- Length: 57.30 m (188 ft) (o/a); 43.10 m (141 ft 5 in) (pressure hull)
- Beam: 5.60 m (18 ft 4 in) (o/a); 3.75 m (12 ft 4 in) (pressure hull)
- Draught: 3.55 m (11 ft 8 in)
- Installed power: 2 × Körting 6-cylinder and 2 × Körting 8-cylinder two stroke paraffin motors with 900 PS (660 kW; 890 shp); 2 × SSW electric motors with 1,040 PS (760 kW; 1,030 shp); 550 rpm surfaced; 600 rpm submerged
- Propulsion: 2 shafts; 2 × 1.30 m (4 ft 3 in) propellers
- Speed: 13.4 knots (24.8 km/h; 15.4 mph) surfaced; 10.2 knots (18.9 km/h; 11.7 mph) submerged
- Range: 3,300 nmi (6,100 km; 3,800 mi) at 9 knots (17 km/h; 10 mph)
- Test depth: 30 m (98 ft)
- Boats & landing craft carried: 1 dinghy
- Complement: 4 officers, 24 men
- Armament: 4 × torpedo tubes (2 each bow and stern); 6 45 cm (17.7 in) torpedoes; 1 × 3.7 cm (1.5 in) Hotchkiss gun

SM U-7 was a Type U 5 U-boat which served in the Imperial German Navy in World War I. Built at Germaniawerft in Kiel between 1909 and 1910, she was launched on 28 July 1910 and commissioned in to the Navy on 18 July 1911.

== Service history ==
At the start of World War I, U-7 formed part of I U-boat Flotilla. She was commanded by Kapitänleutnant Georg König. The boat took part in three war patrols but did not sink any merchant shipping.

On 21 January 1915, U-7 was torpedoed and sunk by SM U-22, which had mistaken her for an enemy submarine. Twenty-four crew were killed, with only one man surviving.

== Bibliography ==
- Gröner, Erich; Jung, Dieter; Maass, Martin (1991). U-boats and Mine Warfare Vessels. German Warships 1815–1945. Vol. 2. Translated by Thomas, Keith; Magowan, Rachel. London: Conway Maritime Press. ISBN 0-85177-593-4.
