= German submarine U-1163 =

German World War II submarine

- U-995 Type VIIC/41 at the Laboe Naval Memorial. This U-boat is almost identical to U-1163.

History

Nazi Germany
- Name: U-1163
- Ordered: 14 October 1941
- Builder: Danziger Werft AG, Danzig
- Yard number: 135
- Laid down: 5 December 1942
- Launched: 12 June 1943
- Commissioned: 6 October 1943
- Fate: Surrendered on 9 May 1945; Sunk on 11 December 1945 during Operation Deadlight

General characteristics
- Class & type: Type VIIC/41 submarine
- Displacement: 759 tonnes (747 long tons) surfaced; 860 t (846 long tons) submerged
- Length: 67.10 m (220 ft 2 in) o/a; 50.50 m (165 ft 8 in) pressure hull
- Beam: 6.20 m (20 ft 4 in) o/a; 4.70 m (15 ft 5 in) pressure hull
- Height: 9.60 m (31 ft 6 in)
- Draught: 4.74 m (15 ft 7 in)
- Installed power: 2,800–3,200 PS (2,100–2,400 kW; 2,800–3,200 bhp) (diesels); 750 PS (550 kW; 740 shp) (electric)
- Propulsion: 2 shafts; 2 × diesel engines; 2 × electric motors
- Speed: 17.7 knots (32.8 km/h; 20.4 mph) surfaced; 7.6 knots (14.1 km/h; 8.7 mph) submerged
- Range: 8,500 nmi (15,700 km; 9,800 mi) at 10 knots (19 km/h; 12 mph) surfaced; 80 nmi (150 km; 92 mi) at 4 knots (7.4 km/h; 4.6 mph) submerged
- Test depth: 230 m (750 ft); Calculated crush depth: 250–295 m (820–968 ft)
- Complement: 44-52 officers & ratings
- Armament: 5 × 53.3 cm (21 in) torpedo tubes (4 bow, 1 stern); 14 × torpedoes; 1 × 8.8 cm (3.46 in) deck gun (220 rounds); 1 × 3.7 cm (1.5 in) Flak M42 AA gun; 2 × 2 cm (0.79 in) C/30 AA guns

Service record
- Part of: 8th U-boat Flotilla; 6 October 1943 – 31 July 1944; 11th U-boat Flotilla; 1 August – 30 September 1944; 13th U-boat Flotilla; 1 October 1944 – 8 May 1945
- Identification codes: M 52 936
- Commanders: Oblt.z.S. Ernst-Ludwig Balduhn; 6 October 1943 – 9 May 1945
- Operations: 4 patrols: 1st patrol: a. 13 – 19 July 1944; b. 1 – 2 August 1944; c. 17 August 1944; d. 22 – 23 August 1944; e. 26 – 27 August 1944; f. 21 – 24 September 1944; g. 3 – 6 October 1944; h. 12 – 13 October 1944; 2nd patrol: a. 15 – 31 October 1944; b. 2 – 4 November 1944; c. 8 – 12 November 1944; d. 14 – 22 November 1944; 3rd patrol: a. 25 November – 16 December 1944; b. 12 – 15 January 1945; c. 28 January – 4 February 1945; 4th patrol: 15 April – 9 May 1945
- Victories: 1 merchant ship sunk (433 GRT)

German submarine U-1163 was a Type VIIC/41 U-boat of Nazi Germany's Kriegsmarine during World War II.

She was ordered on 14 October 1941, and was laid down on 5 December 1942 at Danziger Werft AG, Danzig, as yard number 135. She was launched on 12 June 1943 and commissioned under the command of Oberleutnant zur See Ernst-Ludwig Balduhn on 6 October of that year.

== Design ==
German Type VIIC/41 submarines were preceded by the heavier Type VIIC submarines. U-1163 had a displacement of 759 tonnes (747 long tons) when at the surface and 860 tonnes (850 long tons) while submerged. She had a total length of 67.10 m (220 ft 2 in), a pressure hull length of 50.50 m (165 ft 8 in), a beam of 6.20 m (20 ft 4 in), a height of 9.60 m (31 ft 6 in), and a draught of 4.74 m (15 ft 7 in). The submarine was powered by two Germaniawerft F46 four-stroke, six-cylinder supercharged diesel engines producing a total of 2,800 to 3,200 metric horsepower (2,060 to 2,350 kW; 2,760 to 3,160 shp) for use while surfaced, two Siemens-Schuckert GU 343/38-8 double-acting electric motors producing a total of 750 metric horsepower (550 kW; 740 shp) for use while submerged. She had two shafts and two 1.23 m (4 ft) propellers. The boat was capable of operating at depths of up to 230 metres (750 ft).

The submarine had a maximum surface speed of 17.7 knots (32.8 km/h; 20.4 mph) and a maximum submerged speed of 7.6 knots (14.1 km/h; 8.7 mph). When submerged, the boat could operate for 80 nautical miles (150 km; 92 mi) at 4 knots (7.4 km/h; 4.6 mph); when surfaced, she could travel 8,500 nautical miles (15,700 km; 9,800 mi) at 10 knots (19 km/h; 12 mph). U-1163 was fitted with five 53.3 cm (21 in) torpedo tubes (four fitted at the bow and one at the stern), fourteen torpedoes, one 8.8 cm (3.46 in) SK C/35 naval gun, (220 rounds), one 3.7 cm (1.5 in) Flak M42 and two 2 cm (0.79 in) C/30 anti-aircraft guns. The boat had a complement of between forty-four and sixty.

== Service history ==
U-1163 did not have a very prosperous career. While she was commissioned on 6 October 1943, it was not until 3 December 1944 that she sank her first (and only) enemy vessel. Despite her lack of ships sunk, U-1163 was one of only a handful of German U-boats in World War II to help shoot down a De Havilland Mosquito on 2 August 1944.

U-1163 spent her first eight months in the Kriegsmarine undergoing training operations with the 8th U-boat Flotilla. At the end of her training, she was formally assigned to the 11th U-boat Flotilla stationed in Norway. She began her first patrol on 13 July 1944, almost a full three years after she was ordered.

=== First patrol ===
Following training exercises with the 8th U-boat Flotilla and a journey from Kiel to Flekkefjord Norway, U-1163 began her first official war patrol with the 11th U-boat Flotilla on 13 July 1944. After only seven days at sea however, U-1163 returned to Norway in the coastal town of Arnøy on 19 July.

=== Second patrol ===
After her first patrol, U-1163 spent the next three months traveling up the coast of Norway. On 2 August, U-1163 and an accompanying U-boat, U-771 were traveling on the surface from Stavanger to Kristiansand and had the protection of surface escorts as well. Yet despite all of the measures, two de Havilland Mosquitos (E/333 and S/333) attacked the two U-boats. S/333 was shot down by anti-aircraft fire during the attack and the two U-boats were undamaged.

On 15 October 1944, U-1163 began her second war patrol after leaving Bogenbucht. For 17 days, U-1163 roamed the Arctic Ocean in search of any Allied convoys heading to the Soviet Union. On 31 October, after not a single engagement with any enemy vessels, U-1163 entered Hammerfest, Norway.

=== Third patrol ===
U-1163's third patrol began on 25 November 1944 after she left the port city of Kilbotn. For 22 days, she traveled through the Arctic Ocean in search of any Allied vessels heading to or from the Soviet Union. On 3 December 1944, U-1163 claimed the only enemy vessel in her career. Revoljucija, a Soviet 433 GRT cargo steam ship, had been separated from her convoy after developing engine trouble, and was stopped, protected by a single minesweeper. The U-1163 hit the Revoljucija with a single torpedo, sinking her along with her 23 crew. Thirteen days later, on 16 December, U-1163 returned to Bogenbucht.

=== Fourth patrol ===
The last patrol that U-1163 took part in began on 15 April 1945. She left Kristiansand that day and traveled to the north coast of Ireland. After 25 days at sea, returned to Marvika, Norway where she was handed over to the Allies following the surrender of all German forces a few days before.

== Summary of raiding history ==
Date	Ship Name	Nationality	Tonnage (GRT)	Fate
3 December 1944	Revoljucija	Soviet Union	433	Sunk

== See also ==
- Battle of the Atlantic (1939-1945)

== Bibliography ==
- Busch, Rainer; Röll, Hans-Joachim (1999). German U-boat commanders of World War II : a biographical dictionary. Translated by Brooks, Geoffrey. London, Annapolis, Md: Greenhill Books, Naval Institute Press. ISBN 1-55750-186-6.
- Busch, Rainer; Röll, Hans-Joachim (1999). Deutsche U-Boot-Verluste von September 1939 bis Mai 1945 [German U-boat losses from September 1939 to May 1945]. Der U-Boot-Krieg (in German). Vol. IV. Hamburg, Berlin, Bonn: Mittler. ISBN 3-8132-0514-2.
- Gröner, Erich; Jung, Dieter; Maass, Martin (1991). German Warships 1815–1945, U-boats and Mine Warfare Vessels. Vol. 2. Translated by Thomas, Keith; Magowan, Rachel. London: Conway Maritime Press. ISBN 0-85177-593-4.
