= Dannebrog (disambiguation) =

The Dannebrog is the flag of Denmark.

Dannebrog (until the mid-20th century often spelled Danebrog) also may refer to:

== Flags and orders ==
- Order of the Dannebrog (Danish: Dannebrogordenen), a Royal Danish decoration

== Places ==
- Dannebrog Island, an island in Greenland
- Dannebrog Islands, an island group in Antarctica
- Dannebrog, Nebraska, a village in Nebraska, United States

== Ships ==
- Danish ironclad Dannebrog, a frigate of the Royal Danish Navy, also known as the HDMS Dannebrog (1850)
- HDMS Dannebroge (1692) (The name is spelled Dannebrog in some references)
- HDMY Dannebrog (1879), the first royal Danish side-wheel paddle steam-yacht, named after the flag
- HDMY Dannebrog (A540), a Danish royal yacht, named after the flag
