= Cais do Sodré shipwreck =

The Cais do Sodré shipwreck was found in Lisbon, Portugal, in April 1995, during the excavation of a subway station. It was found at an approximate depth of 6.5 m, and carbon dated to circa 1500. It was preserved along 24 m, and its bow and stern were cut by the tunnel walls. There were almost no associated artifacts.
