= HMS Nasturtium (1915) =

Minesweeper of the Royal Navy

History

United Kingdom
- Namesake: Nasturtium
- Builder: A. McMillan and Sons, Dumbarton, Scotland
- Laid down: 1 July 1915
- Launched: 21 December 1915
- Fate: Sunk off Malta, 28 April 1916

General characteristics
- Class & type: Arabis-class sloop
- Displacement: 1,200 tons
- Length: 255 ft 3 in (77.80 m) p/p; 267 ft 9 in (81.61 m) o/a
- Beam: 33 ft 6 in (10.21 m)
- Draught: 11 ft 9 in (3.58 m)
- Propulsion: 1 × 4-cylinder triple expansion engine; 2 × cylindrical boilers; 1 screw
- Speed: 17 knots (31 km/h; 20 mph)
- Range: 2,000 nmi (3,700 km; 2,300 mi) at 15 kn (28 km/h; 17 mph) with max. 260 tons of coal
- Complement: 79 men
- Armament: 2 × 1 - QF 4 inch Mk IV guns, BL 4 inch Mk IX guns or QF 4.7 inch Mk IV guns and 2 × 1 - 3-pounders (47 mm) AA.

HMS Nasturtium was an Arabis-class sloop built in Scotland and launched in 1915.

== Design and construction ==
Nasturtium was one of 56 Arabis class sloops built for the Royal Navy during World War I. The sloops-of-war were intended for minesweeping duties in European waters.

Nasturtium had a displacement of 1,200 tons. She was 255 feet 3 inches (77.80 m) long between perpendiculars, 267 feet 9 inches (81.61 m) in length overall, had a beam of 33 feet 6 inches (10.21 m), and a draught of 11 feet 9 inches (3.58 m). The propulsion system consisted of two coal-fired cylindrical boilers supplying steam to a four-cylinder triple expansion engine, connected to a single propeller shaft. Maximum speed was 15 knots (28 km/h; 17 mph), and the ship could achieve a range of 2,000 nautical miles (3,700 km; 2,300 mi). Up to 250 tons of coal could be carried.

Nasturtium was laid down for the Royal Navy by A. McMillan and Sons, Dumbarton, Scotland on 1 July 1915 with yard number 464. She was launched on 21 December 1915.

== History ==
HMS Nasturtium was based at Malta. On 24 April 1916, she left Malta but was ordered to return immediately to search for a submarine in the vicinity. On 27 April the German submarine U-73 laid 22 mines outside the Grand Harbour of Valletta. The battleship HMS Russell sank after hitting two of these mines.

Nasturtium arrived in Malta on 27 April. The Rear Admiral of Patrols based at Fort Rinella ordered the sloop to search for mines and submarines. At 19:10 she ended up in the same minefield as the Russell and struck a mine which exploded 7 feet below the waterline on her starboard side close to the foremost funnel. Seven crew members were killed. Her boiler rooms began to flood and the tug Prompt was sent from Sliema to assist her. By 21:00, she had a heavy list and all the crew were evacuated, except for a few hands on the forecastle. By 21:38 the remaining crew abandoned the ship since she was now listing by 30 degrees to port. At 21:50 the naval yacht HMY Aegusa hit a mine in the same minefield and sank.

The Nasturtium finally sank at 02:45 on 28 April 1916. A court martial regarding her loss was held on board HMS Theseus on 8 May 1916. Her wreck now lies at a depth of 67 metres.
