= HM LST-405 =

World War II tank landing ship

History

United Kingdom
- Name: LST-405
- Ordered: as a Type S3-M-K2 hull, MCE hull 925
- Builder: Bethlehem-Fairfield Shipyard, Baltimore, Maryland
- Yard number: 2177
- Laid down: 30 August 1942
- Launched: 31 October 1942
- Commissioned: 28 December 1942
- Decommissioned: February 1946
- Stricken: 17 April 1946
- Identification: Hull symbol: LST-405
- Fate: Sunk, 27 March 1946

General characteristics
- Class & type: LST-1-class tank landing ship
- Displacement: 4,080 long tons (4,145 t) full load; 2,160 long tons (2,190 t) landing
- Length: 328 ft (100 m) oa
- Beam: 50 ft (15 m)
- Draft: Full load: 8 ft 2 in (2.49 m) forward; 14 ft 1 in (4.29 m) aft; Landing at 2,160 t: 3 ft 11 in (1.19 m) forward; 9 ft 10 in (3.00 m) aft
- Installed power: 2 × 900 hp (670 kW) Electro-Motive Diesel 12-567A diesel engines; 1,700 shp (1,300 kW)
- Propulsion: 1 × Falk main reduction gears; 2 × Propellers
- Speed: 12 kn (22 km/h; 14 mph)
- Range: 24,000 nmi (44,000 km; 28,000 mi) at 9 kn (17 km/h; 10 mph) while displacing 3,960 long tons (4,024 t)
- Boats & landing craft carried: 2 or 6 x LCVPs
- Capacity: 2,100 tons oceangoing maximum; 350 tons main deckload
- Troops: 163
- Complement: 117
- Armament: Varied, ultimate armament; 1 × QF 12-pounder 12 cwt naval gun; 6 × 20 mm (0.79 in) Oerlikon cannon; 4 × Fast Aerial Mine (FAM) mounts

Service record
- Operations: Invasion of Reggio; Anzio landing

HMS LST-405 was a Royal Navy tank landing ship of World War II. Built as a LST-1-class tank landing ship she was transferred to the UK and served in the European and Mediterranean and Middle Eastern theatres.

== Construction ==
LST-405 was laid down on 30 August 1942, under Maritime Commission (MARCOM) contract, MC hull 925, by the Bethlehem-Fairfield Shipyard, Baltimore, Maryland; launched 31 October 1942; then transferred to the United Kingdom and commissioned into the RN on 28 December 1942.

== Service history ==
The tank landing ship was sunk on 27 March, while in Royal Navy service. LST-405 was struck from the navy list on 17 April 1946.

== See also ==
- List of United States Navy LSTs

== Notes ==
Citations

== Bibliography ==
Online resources

- "LST-405". Dictionary of American Naval Fighting Ships. Naval History and Heritage Command. This article incorporates text from this source, which is in the public domain.
- "Bethlehem-Fairfield, Baltimore MD". www.ShipbuildingHistory.com. 14 August 2008.
- "USS LST-405". NavSource. 10 October 2008.
