= SS Principessa Jolanda =

A number of steamships were named Principessa Jolanda, including -

- SS Principessa Jolanda (1904), an Italian cargo ship wrecked in 1926
- SS Principessa Jolanda (1907), an Italian ocean liner wrecked on launch
