= SS Revoljucija =

Coordinates: 68°44′N 37°49′E

History

Norway
- Name: Activ
- Operator: A/S Alliance (A.C. Hein & Son)
- Port of registry: Arendal
- Builder: Stavanger Støberi & Dokk, Stavanger
- Completed: July 1909
- Fate: Sold to Soviet Russia in 1918

Soviet Union
- Name: Revoljucija
- Operator: Severnoje Gosudarstvennoe Morskoe Parokhodstvo (SGMP)
- Port of registry: Arkhangelsk
- Acquired: 1918
- Fate: Torpedoed and sunk on 3 December 1944

General characteristics
- Tonnage: 433
- Propulsion: single screw
- Crew: 23

Revoljucija (Revolution) was a Soviet steam merchant that was sunk by the German submarine U-1163 during World War II.

== History ==
=== As the Activ ===
The Revoljucija was originally a Norwegian-owned vessel named the Activ. She was completed in 1909 and belonged to the A/S Alliance (A.C. Hein & Son). Her home port was Arendal from 1909 to 1918 when she was sold to the then unrecognized Soviet Russia. Upon acquiring her, the Soviets renamed her the Revoljucija (Russian for Revolution). Her new operators were Severnoje Gosudarstvennoe Morskoe Parokhodstvo (SGMP) and her new home port was Arkhangelsk.

=== As the Revoljucija ===
During World War II, the Revoljucija served as a member of convoy KB-35 that transferred supplies from the United States to the Russian port of Arkhangelsk and Murmansk. On 2 December 1944, the Revoljucija left Kola Bay along with the other member of the KB-35 convoy, the Soviet steam merchant Kama. The two steam merchants were under the escort of the patrol ship SKR-20 and the minesweeper T-884 (No 38). Upon reaching the Litskie Islands the Revoljucija's engines broke down and the ship was forced to stop, leaving the other steamer to continue on to Arkhangelsk along with the patrol ship while T-884 (No 38) was to remain with the Revoljucija in order to protect her from any German submarines. In the early morning hours of 3 December, the German submarine U-1163 encountered the stranded Revoljucija and the minesweeper. The U-boat fired a torpedo at the group, thinking that they were patrol vessels. The initial torpedo missed its target. A few minutes after the first torpedo missed, U-1163 fired another torpedo at the two ships, hitting the hull of the Revoljucija and causing her to sink in 20 seconds with the loss of all 23 of her crew.
