= Type U 5 submarine =

German pre-World War I submarine class

Class overview
- Builders: Germaniawerft, Kiel
- Operators: Imperial German Navy
- Preceded by: Type U 3
- Succeeded by: Type U 9
- Completed: 4
- Lost: 4

General characteristics
- Displacement: 505 t (497 long tons) surfaced; 636 t (626 long tons) submerged
- Length: 57.30 m (188 ft 0 in) (o/a); 43.10 m (141 ft 5 in) (pressure hull)
- Beam: 5.60 m (18 ft 4 in) (o/a); 3.75 m (12 ft 4 in) (pressure hull)
- Draught: 3.55 m (11 ft 8 in)
- Propulsion: 2 shafts; 2 × Körting 6-cylinder and 2 × Körting 8-cylinder two stroke Kerosene motors with 900 PS (660 kW; 890 shp); 2 × Siemens-Schuckert electric motors with 1,040 PS (760 kW; 1,030 shp)
- Speed: 13.4 knots (24.8 km/h; 15.4 mph) surfaced; 10.2 knots (18.9 km/h; 11.7 mph) submerged
- Range: 3,300 nmi (6,100 km; 3,800 mi) at 9 knots (17 km/h; 10 mph) surfaced; 55 nmi (102 km; 63 mi) at 5 knots (9.3 km/h; 5.8 mph)
- Test depth: 30 m (98 ft)
- Complement: 4 officers, 24 men
- Armament: 4 × 45 cm (17.7 in) torpedo tubes (2 each bow and stern) with 6 torpedoes; 1 × 3.7 cm (1.5 in) Hotchkiss gun

Type U 5 was a class of four gasoline-powered U-boats built between 1908 and 1911 which served in the Imperial German Navy during World War I. The class was the earliest U-boat type to see active service during the war. (Note: Earlier classes of boat saw service only as training boats during the war.) All four of the boats were lost within 14 months of war breaking out.

== Design ==
Type U 5s had an overall length of 57.30 m (188 ft 0 in) The boats' beam was 5.60 m (18 ft 4 in), the draught was 3.55 m (11 ft 8 in). The boats displaced 505 tonnes (497 long tons) when surfaced and 636 t (626 long tons) when submerged.

Type U 5s were fitted with two Körting 6-cylinder and two 8-cylinder two-stroke paraffin engines with a total of 900 metric horsepower (662 kW; 888 bhp) for use on the surface and two SSW double-acting electric motors with a total of 760 kW (1,033 PS; 1,019 shp) for underwater use. These engines powered two shafts, which gave the boats a top surface speed of 13.4 knots (24.8 km/h; 15.4 mph), and 10.2 knots (18.9 km/h; 11.7 mph) when submerged. Cruising range was 3,300 nautical miles (6,100 km; 3,800 mi) at 9 knots (17 km/h; 10 mph) on the surface and 55 nmi (102 km; 63 mi) at 5 knots (9.3 km/h; 5.8 mph) submerged. Constructional diving depth (Note: Constructional diving depth had a safety factor of 2.5, which meant that crushing depth was 2.5 times construction diving depth.) was 50 m (164 ft 1 in).

The U-boats were armed with four 45 cm (18 in) torpedo tubes, two fitted in the bow and two in the stern, and carried six torpedoes. The boats' complement was 4 officers and 24 enlisted men.

Type U 5 U-boats were the first U-boats to be equipped with a radiotelegraphy station. This station had a range of 30 nmi (56 km; 35 mi) between U-boats and double that distance towards shore stations. Two aerial masts were installed on the deck, which could be lowered from inside the boat. A crude underwater telegraph consisting of a bell with a clapper activated by compressed air, was also introduced with the Type U 5s, but this system was not deemed satisfactory.

== List of Type U 5 boats ==
All four boats of the class were built at Germaniawerft in Kiel starting in 1908. They were commissioned between July 1910 and June 1911.

Name	Launched	Commissioned	Ships sunk (GRT)	Fate
U-5	8 January 1910	2 July 1910	None	Lost around 18 December 1914 in the English Channel.
U-6	18 May 1910	12 August 1910	16 (9,614) (Note: U-6 also took three ships totalling 2,337 GRT as prizes.)	Sunk by HMS E16 on 15 September 1915 off Stavanger.
U-7	28 July 1910	18 July 1911	None	Sunk accidentally by U-22 on 21 January 1915 off the north coast of the Netherlands.
U-8	14 March 1911	18 June 1911	5 (15,049)	Scuttled on 4 March 1915 in the English Channel after becoming caught in anti-submarine nets.

== Bibliography ==
- Gröner, Erich; Jung, Dieter; Maass, Martin (1991). German Warships 1815–1945, U-boats and Mine Warfare Vessels. Vol. 2. Translated by Thomas, Keith; Magowan, Rachel. London: Conway Maritime Press. ISBN 0-85177-593-4.
- Herzog, Bodo (1993). Deutsche U-Boote : 1906 - 1966 [German U-boats : 1906 - 1966] (in German). Erlangen: Müller. ISBN 9783860700365.
- Möller, Eberhard; Brack, Werner (2004). The Encyclopedia of U-Boats. London: Chatham. ISBN 1-85367-623-3.
- Rössler, Eberhard (1981). The U-boat: The evolution and technical history of German submarines. London: Cassell & Co. ISBN 0-304-36120-8.
