= SM U-5 (Germany) =

1910–1914 submarine

Coordinates: 51°23′N 3°11′E

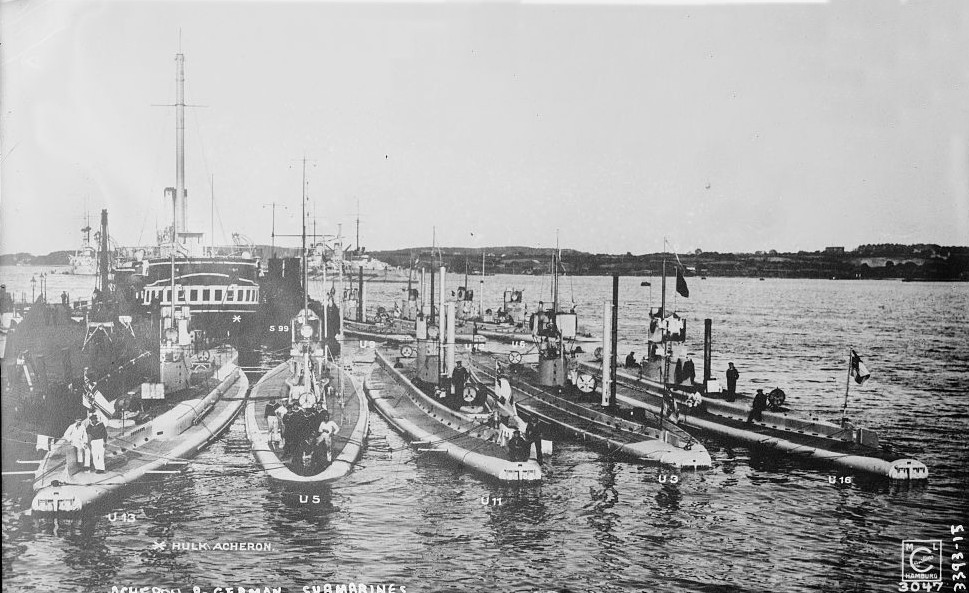
- SM U-5 in the harbour at Kiel (second left)

History

German Empire
- Name: U-5
- Ordered: 8 April 1908
- Builder: Germaniawerft, Kiel
- Cost: 2,540,000 Goldmark
- Yard number: 147
- Laid down: 24 August 1908
- Launched: 8 January 1910
- Commissioned: 2 July 1910
- Fate: Lost around 18 December 1914

General characteristics
- Class & type: Type U 5 submarine
- Displacement: 505 t (497 long tons) surfaced; 636 t (626 long tons) submerged
- Length: 57.30 m (188 ft 0 in) (o/a); 43.10 m (141 ft 5 in) (pressure hull)
- Beam: 5.60 m (18 ft 4 in) (o/a); 3.75 m (12 ft 4 in) (pressure hull)
- Draught: 3.55 m (11 ft 8 in)
- Propulsion: 2 shafts; 2 × Körting 6-cylinder and 2 × Körting 8-cylinder two stroke Kerosene motors with 900 PS (660 kW; 890 shp); 2 × Siemens-Schuckert electric motors with 1,040 PS (760 kW; 1,030 shp); 550 rpm surfaced; 600 rpm submerged
- Speed: 13.4 knots (24.8 km/h; 15.4 mph) surfaced; 10.2 knots (18.9 km/h; 11.7 mph) submerged
- Range: 3,300 nmi (6,100 km; 3,800 mi) at 9 knots (17 km/h; 10 mph) surfaced; 55 nmi (102 km; 63 mi) at 4.5 knots (8.3 km/h; 5.2 mph)
- Test depth: 30 m (98 ft)
- Boats & landing craft carried: 1 dinghy
- Complement: 4 officers, 24 men
- Armament: 4 × 45 cm (17.7 in) torpedo tubes (2 each bow and stern) with 6 torpedoes; 1 × 3.7 cm (1.5 in) Hotchkiss gun

Service record
- Part of: I Flotilla; 1 August – 18 December 1914
- Commanders: Kptlt. Johannes Lemmer; 1 August – 18 December 1914
- Operations: 2 patrols
- Victories: None

SM U-5 was a German Type U 5 submarine which served in the Imperial German Navy during World War I. Built at Germaniawerft in Kiel between 1908 and 1910, she was commissioned on 2 July 1910.

At the start of World War I U-5 was commanded by Kapitänleutnant Johannes Lemmer. The boat undertook two war patrols but did not sink any ships. In December 1914 she transferred to the Belgian port of Zeebrugge to carry out coastal patrols. She was lost in what is presumed to have been an accident close to the port on or around 18 December 1914. There were no survivors from her crew of 29.

On 4 September 2023, it was announced that the wreck of U-5 had been located close to Zeebrugge. It was found near the wreck of UC-14, also located by the same team, which was lost to mines in October 1917. The wreck of U-5 was reported as being in good condition, whereas UC-14 had clearly been impacted by an explosion.

== Bibliography ==
- Gröner, Erich; Jung, Dieter; Maass, Martin (1991). German Warships 1815–1945, U-boats and Mine Warfare Vessels. Vol. 2. Translated by Thomas, Keith; Magowan, Rachel. London: Conway Maritime Press. ISBN 0-85177-593-4.
- Rössler, Eberhard (1985). Die deutschen U-Boote und ihre Werften: U-Bootbau bis Ende des 1. Weltkriegs, Konstruktionen für das Ausland und die Jahre 1935–1945 [The German Submarines and Their Shipyards: Submarine Construction Until the End of the First World War] (in German). Vol. I. Koblenz: Bernard & Graefe. ISBN 3-7637-5213-7.
