= HNoMS Brand (1898) =

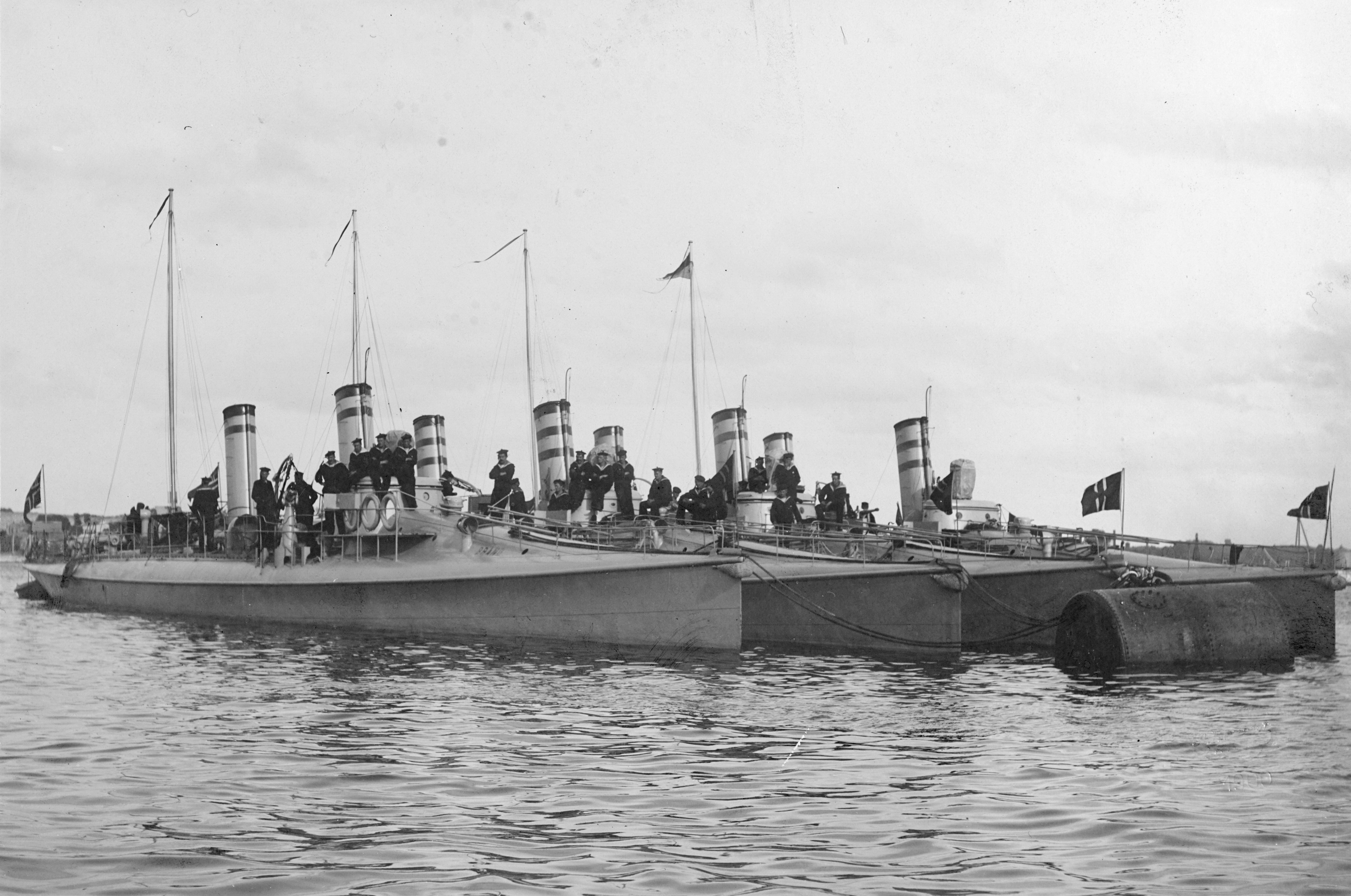
- Brand (left) with three sister ships in Kiel in 1900

History

Norway
- Name: Brand
- Namesake: An archaic spelling of the Norwegian word brann, meaning fire
- Builder: The Royal Norwegian Navy Shipyard at Karljohansvern in Horten
- Yard number: 80
- Launched: 22 September 1898
- Out of service: 11 April 1940
- Captured: by the German on 16 April 1940

Service record
- Part of: 4th Torpedo Boat Division, 2nd Naval District (1939–1940)
- Commanders: Christian Blom (1900); Rolf von Krogh (1901 and 1905); Ivar Arne Midtland (1940)
- Operations: Opposing the German invasion of Norway (9 April 1940)

Nazi Germany
- Name: Tarantel
- Namesake: Lycosa tarantula
- Acquired: 16 April 1940
- Fate: Returned to the Royal Norwegian Navy in May 1945, then decommissioned and scrapped

Service record
- Part of: Hafenschutz flotille Bergen; (-December 1940); 55th Vorpoosten flotille; (December 1940 – May 1945)
- Operations: Norwegian Campaign; (April–May 1940); German occupation of Norway; (June 1940 – May 1945)

General characteristics
- Class & type: 1. class torpedo boat
- Displacement: 107 tons
- Length: 39.9 metres (130.91 ft)
- Beam: 4.9 metres (16.08 ft)
- Draught: 2.7 metres (8 ft 10.30 in)
- Propulsion: 1,100 indicated horsepower triple expansion steam engine
- Speed: 21 knots (38.89 km/h; 24.17 mph)
- Range: 900 nautical miles (1,666.80 km; 1,035.70 mi) at 12 knots (22.22 km/h; 13.81 mph); or; 500 nautical miles (926.00 km; 575.39 mi) at 16 knots (29.63 km/h; 18.41 mph)
- Complement: 19 officers and men
- Armament: 2 × 37 mm QF guns; 2 × 45 cm torpedo tubes; Added by the Germans: 2 × machine guns; 6 × depth charges

HNoMS Brand was a 1.-class torpedo boat constructed in 1898. She served the Royal Norwegian Navy for more than four decades, including neutrality protection duties during the First World War. Having once again been employed on neutrality protection duty at the outbreak of the Second World War, Brand was captured by the Germans during their invasion of Norway in April 1940.

After serving in Nazi Germany's Kriegsmarine in the Norwegian Campaign that followed the invasion, she was renamed Tarantel and employed as a Vorpostenboot in occupied Norway. Having survived the Second World War, Brand was returned to the Royal Norwegian Navy in May 1945 and soon decommissioned and scrapped.

== Design and construction ==
Brand was a 107-ton vessel, with a length of 39.9 metres (130.91 ft), a beam of 4.9 metres (16.08 ft) and a draught of 2.7 metres (8 ft 10.30 in), built at the Royal Norwegian Navy Shipyard at Karljohansvern in Horten, as yard number 80. She was one of three 1.-class torpedo boats built at Karljohansvern in 1898, the other two boats being Storm and Trods. The three vessels were the first of their class to be built in Norway, the first three 1.-class boats having been built and delivered by the German Schichau-Werke shipbuilders.

Brand was armed with two 37 mm quick-firing guns and two 45 cm torpedo tubes, and manned by a crew of 19 officers and men. Her 1,100 indicated horsepower triple expansion steam engine could propel her at a maximum speed of 21 knots (38.89 km/h; 24.17 mph). The 1.-class vessels had a very long range for their size, being able to cover a distance of 900 nautical miles (1,666.80 km; 1,035.70 mi) at 12 knots (22.22 km/h; 13.81 mph) or 500 nautical miles (926.00 km; 575.39 mi) at 16 knots (29.63 km/h; 18.41 mph).

The design of the German-built vessels and the 1898 series that included Brand, was criticized for having insufficient speed. Although considered as having quite good seagoing characteristics, the vessels had difficulty firing torpedoes in rough seas. In calm seas the boats were hard to spot, with little engine noise or bow wave, which increased the chance of a successful torpedo attack. The boats were also seen as not being manoeuvrable enough, as well as having an exposed bridge in a bow turret and poor ventilation. Some of the issues of the early vessels were dealt with in the last four 1.-class boats built.

== Early service ==
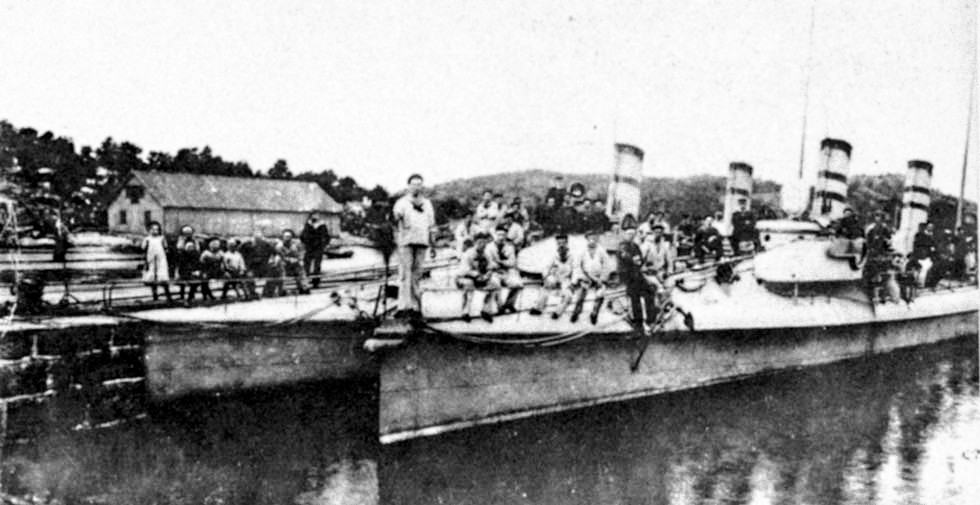
Brand (left) and fellow 1.-class torpedo boat Storm at Marvika naval base in 1903

In the summer of 1900, Brand took part in a comparatively large-scale naval exercise, together with three other 1.-class boats Storm, Delfin and Trods. In addition to the torpedo boats the Royal Norwegian Navy deployed the coastal defence ships Harald Haarfagre and Tordenskjold and the gunboat Frithjof on a cruise to Marstrand in Sweden and Kiel in Germany. The exercises saw the torpedo boats and the larger warships train on coordinating their manoeuvres and actions. During the training cruise Brand was under the command of the future Royal Norwegian Navy Shipyard director, Captain Christian Blom. During the summer training cruises of 1901 and 1905, Brand was under the command of the future Arctic explorer First Lieutenant Rolf von Krogh.

== First World War ==
When the First World War broke out in 1914, the Royal Norwegian Navy and the Norwegian coastal fortresses were fully mobilized, along with supporting units of the Norwegian Army. The state of armed neutrality was maintained until the end of the war in 1918. Brand took part in neutrality protection patrols during the war, and was based in Bergen in Western Norway. In May 1915, Brand carried out torpedo firing exercises together with three other torpedo boats.

In the immediate aftermath of the war, from 12 December 1918 until the spring of 1919, Brand was stationed at Ålesund. She was tasked with patrolling for drifting mines off the coast. During their stay in Ålesund, the torpedo boat's crew deactivated or destroyed 17 naval mines, and were also put and stand-by to intervene in riots between locals and fishermen in Fosnavåg. In February 1919, the crew of Brand rescued two survivors from the shipwrecked fishing vessel Korsfjord I, which had run aground with the loss of seven crewmen.

== Inter-war years ==
Between the world wars, the Norwegian torpedo boat fleet carried out exercises during the summers, but were severely restricted by a lack of funds. The boats that had been built around the start of the 20th century were outdated as warships, and mostly restricted to lying in port. Seventeen torpedo boats had been decommissioned in the years 1920–1931, after having been worn out by the intensive neutrality protection service in the preceding war years. Although 23 torpedo boats were retained, no modernizations were carried out, and the vessels were considered as being mostly useful as escorts and coastal guard vessels.

== Second World War ==
=== Neutrality protection ===
At the outbreak of the Second World War, many of the vessels of the Royal Norwegian Navy were activated for neutrality protection duties. The 1939 mobilization of both the Royal Norwegian Navy and the coastal artillery was less comprehensive than that in 1914, due to a lack of trained crews and officers to man the ships. Brand was mobilized, and formed part of the 2nd Naval District's 4th Torpedo Boat Division. In addition to Brand, the 4th Torpedo Boat Division was made up by the fellow 1.-class boats Sæl and Storm. The 4th Torpedo Boat Division was under the command of Lieutenant Thorleif Pettersen, who was also the commanding officer of Storm. Brand was under the command of Second Lieutenant Ivar Arne Midtland, and carried out escort missions along the Norwegian coast after the outbreak of war. The ships of the Royal Norwegian Navy were scattered along the Norwegian coast to provide a capacity to hail and escort foreign ships and confront possible neutrality violators at as many points as possible. The deployment of the warships singly with large distances between each vessel reduced their combat value against any determined naval attack against Norway. By April 1940, Brand was based at Fedje, but had been sent to Bergen for repairs at the naval base Marineholmen days before the 9 April 1940 German invasion of Norway.

On 8 April 1940, the commanding officer of the 2nd Naval District, Rear-Admiral Carsten Tank-Nielsen ordered the commanders of Brand, Sæl and Storm to refuel, resupply ammunition and put their boats on action stations. Brand began resupplying in Bergen shortly after receiving her orders from Rear-Admiral Tank-Nielsen. Similar orders went out the other warships of Bergen section of the naval district, foremost the destroyer Garm and the submarine B-6.

=== German invasion ===
Reports of fighting between Norwegian coastal fortresses and foreign warships in the Oslofjord further east reached the 2nd Naval District at 00:28 on 9 April. In response to the reports, naval mines were laid in the leads off Bergen and torpedo boats deployed to intercept any possible intruders making their way towards the city. Warning shots and live rounds were fired shortly after 02:00 at the intruding German flotilla by Lerøy Fort, and unsuccessful attacks and intercepts carried out by several warships as the warships of the German Gruppe 3 closed in on Bergen. (Note: Gruppe 3 consisted of the cruisers Köln and Königsberg, the training ship Bremse, the torpedo boats Wolf and Leopard, five E-boat fast attack craft, and the E-boat mother ship Carl Peters. The German invasion flotilla carried a 1,900-strong landing force.) Brand had been ordered to take up an ambush position at Alvøy, but was delayed in reaching her designated position by necessary repairs. The Norwegian warships at Bergen had been ordered by Rear-Admiral Tank-Nielsen to fire at any intruding ships.

Having completed her repairs, Brand left Marineholmen at 03:30. By that time the German invasion flotilla had reached the inner line of fortifications off Bergen, and was being engaged by the forts at Kvarven and Hellen. Brand was put on action stations and readied for torpedo attack from a position in the inlet Gravdalsviken. From her ambush position Brand could serve as a substitute for Kvarven's torpedo battery, which was inoperable at the time. When the German ships forced their way past the Norwegian coastal forts and entered Bergen harbour, they passed Brand at ranges between 700 metres (2,296.59 ft) and 1,000 metres (3,280.84 ft) at speeds estimated as between 10 knots (18.52 km/h; 11.51 mph) and 12 knots (22.22 km/h; 13.81 mph). Although one or both of the torpedo launchers on Brand were primed and ready to fire at the intruding warships and chances to score a hit were "exceptionally good", (Note: As assessed by the other crew members of Brand, and the post-war Military Investigative Commission of 1946.) Second Lieutenant Midtland failed to give the order to fire. Eventually the increasing daylight reduced the chances of a successful attack, and the Germans had completed their intrusion into Bergen harbour. After removing his ship from her defensive position, Second Lieutenant Midtland brought Brand to port in Laksevåg, before leaving the boat and crew and heading to Marineholmen, where he was quickly interned by the Germans. Second Lieutenant Midtland had decided against scuttling his vessel, later claiming to have discussed the matter with a senior officer who had advised him that there was no point in destroying Brand due to the vessel's age. The remaining crew members abandoned Brand on 11 April. On 16 April, the Germans seized Brand in Laksevåg and took her into Kriegsmarine service. The Norwegian crew from Brand was interned at Marineholmen and held captive on various ships for close to two months. Brand was one of four Norwegian warships captured by the Germans near Bergen shortly after their attack, the others being the minelayer Uller and two guard ships.

Lieutenant (promoted since 1940) Ivar Arne Midtland was investigated post-war by the Military Investigative Commission of 1946, and found to have violated Paragraphs 77 and 99 of the Norwegian military penal code by not attacking when he had the chance, but was let off with a reprimand because of his "youth and inexperience".

=== German service ===
Shortly after their 16 April take-over of Brand, the Germans sent her and a motor boat to land troops on the island of Flatøy near Bergen. Flatøy was the location of both a coastal fort and a Royal Norwegian Navy Air Service base. As Brand was landing German troops on the south side of the island, a British Blackburn Skua dive bomber attacked the torpedo boat at around 07:00. Brand was struck in the boiler room amidships by a bomb that failed to explode and severely damaged, the German crew suffering casualties. The air attack led the Germans to abandon their landings and use the motor boat to tow Brand to Bergen for repairs. A German sailor who had been thrown overboard by the bomb and swam ashore at Isdalstø was captured by Norwegian troops and brought to Balestrand on 17 April. Brand was further damaged in an attack on Bergen harbour by 803 Naval Air Squadron Blackburn Skuas later the same day, along with the U-boat U-58. After completing repairs in Bergen, Brand was deployed in late April 1940 for patrols of the entrance to the Sognefjord, scouting for Norwegian naval forces and escorting the German-controlled minelayers Uller and Tyr. Although spotted by Norwegian Marinens Flyvebaatfabrikk M.F.11 reconnaissance seaplanes late on 30 April, Brand was mistaken for a warship under Norwegian or British control and not attacked. The German-manned torpedo boat also escaped the attention of searching Norwegian warships. (Note: The minelayers Brand supported were less fortunate. On 1 May, Uller suffered near misses from bombs dropped by Royal Norwegian Navy Air Service seaplanes and was damaged to the extent that she had to be beached and scuttled, while Tyr was ambushed and machine gunned by Norwegian forces while passing through a narrow strait on her way back to Bergen the same day, suffering casualties.) The fighting in Western Norway ended on 2 May 1940. During her initial stint in German service, Brand was manned by a crew drawn from the training ship Bremse.

Brand was renamed Tarantel by the Germans and used as a Vorpostenboot in occupied Norway for the duration of the war. She initially served in the Hafenschutz flotille Bergen with pennant number NB. 19, before she was transferred to 55th Vorpoosten flotille in December 1940 and given the pennant number V.5519. The Germans rebuilt her slightly during the war years, including adding an enclosed bridge, two machine guns and six depth charges. Tarantel was handed over to the Royal Norwegian Navy following the German capitulation in 1945. The Norwegians did not return the old torpedo boat to active service again, instead decommissioning and scrapping her in 1946. Brand's name was reused for a former German E-boat (ex-S-303) which served in the Royal Norwegian Navy from 1947 to 1951.
