= HNoMS Draug (1908) =

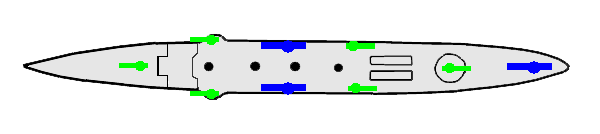
- Draug at some point before the Second World War. Note QF guns in blisters along the side to allow forward fire.

History

Norway
- Name: Draug
- Namesake: The sea revenant Draugr
- Builder: The Royal Norwegian Navy's shipyard at Karljohansvern in Horten
- Yard number: 103
- Launched: 18 March 1908
- Commissioned: 1908
- Decommissioned: 19 November 1943
- Fate: Sold for scrapping in 1944

Service record
- Commanders: Captain T. Horve; (8 April 1940 – 3 November 1941); Lieutenant Frodesen; (3 November 1941 – 21 March; 1942); Lieutenant H. Øi; (21 March 1942 – 13 April 1942); CinC. Port Edgar; (13 April 1942 – 5 February 1943)
- Operations: Opposing the German invasion of Norway; Battle of Britain
- Victories: 1 ship (7,624 tons) sunk

General characteristics
- Class & type: Draug-class destroyer
- Displacement: 578 tons standard
- Length: 69.2 m (227.03 ft)
- Beam: 7.3 m (23.95 ft)
- Draft: 2.9 m (9.51 ft)
- Propulsion: Triple expansion steam engine with 7500 hp
- Speed: 27 knots (50.00 km/h)
- Complement: 76 men
- Armament: 6 × 7.6 cm (3-inch) guns; 1 × 12.7 mm Colt; anti-aircraft machine gun; 1 × Madsen anti-aircraft machine; gun (inoperable); 3 × trainable 45 cm torpedo tubes; 4 × depth charges

HNoMS Draug was the lead ship of the three-ship Draug class of destroyers built for the Royal Norwegian Navy in the years 1908–1913. The four-stacked destroyer was kept in service long after she was obsolete, and took part in the defence of Norway during the German invasion in 1940.

In the early hours of 9 April 1940, Draug intercepted and captured the clandestine German transport Main. After deciding that the outdated Draug could do little to oppose the invading German forces, the ship's captain decided to sail to the United Kingdom, bringing the captured German ship with him. After being subjected to a German bombing attack, Main was sunk and Draug proceeded to the United Kingdom with the German crew as prisoners. In exile in the United Kingdom Draug served as a guard ship, convoy escort, MTB mother ship and depot ship. Decommissioned in late 1943, Draug was sold for scrapping in 1944.

== Construction ==
Draug was built at the Royal Norwegian Navy's shipyard at Karljohansvern in Horten with yard number 103. Her steam engine required high quality anthracite coal imported from the United Kingdom.

== First World War ==
During the First World War, Draug was employed on neutrality protection duties. She formed part the Royal Norwegian Navy's Western Norway squadron, being based in Haugesund.

== Second World War ==
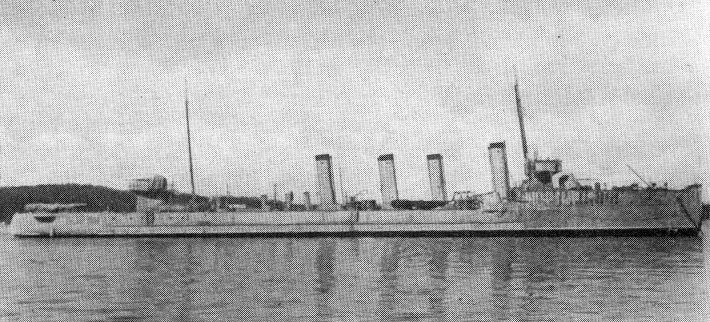
Draug prior to the Second World War

When the Second World War broke out Draug had, as had her sister ships Troll and Garm, been mothballed for a number of years as part of pre–war savings on the Norwegian military budget. Draug had been anchored at Marineholmen in Bergen, the two other vessels at Horten. With the outbreak of war the three Draug-class vessels were reactivated on 5 September 1939 in order to take part in guarding Norwegian neutrality. When the reactivation order came, it took well over a month for workers to find and repair all the cracks and leaks in the ship's steam boilers and make her seaworthy again. In early October 1939 Draug was ready for action. The small destroyers of the Draug class were not considered fit for potential combat operations and were only meant to perform escort and guard duties.

One of the main weaknesses of the Draug-class ships was their lack of effective anti-aircraft armament, Draug herself being equipped with a single 12.7 mm Colt anti-aircraft machine gun. She also carried a Madsen machine gun that was rendered inoperable by the absence of a vital part. Draug's anti-submarine weapons were equally primitive, with four depth charges located on the stern. The depth charges had no throwing mechanism and had to be dropped overboard manually. The ship also had no radar or asdic to help in locating targets.

=== German invasion of Norway ===
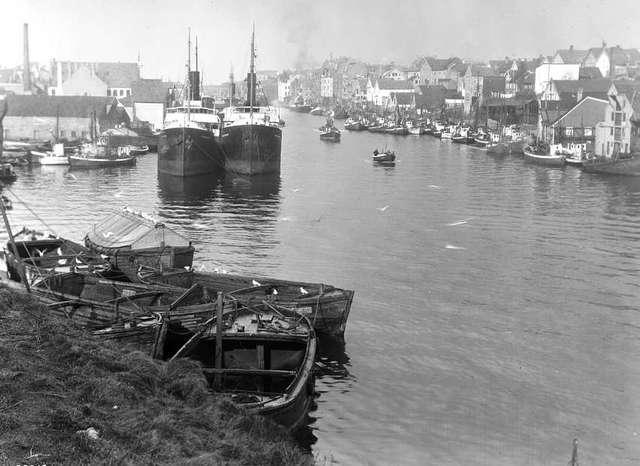
The port of Haugesund prior to the Second World War

The beginning of April 1940 saw Draug part of the 2nd Naval District's 1st destroyer division, covering an area roughly the same as the Vestlandet and Trøndelag regions. She was based in the small south-western port town of Haugesund and carrying out escort missions along the western coast. The day before the invasion, on 8 April Draug escorted the 7,369 ton German merchant vessel Seattle, a ship that would be sunk outside Kristiansand the next day, when she was caught in the crossfire between the German invasion fleet and Norwegian coastal artillery at Odderøya Fort. The crew of Seattle was captured by Norwegian troops and held as PoWs until freed by the advancing invasion forces on 10 April. As she was finishing her escort mission, Draug received orders from the Norwegian Naval Command to return at full speed to Haugesund and refuel her coal stores. When Draug arrived at Haugesund at about 15:00, the ships' commander, Captain (later Vice Admiral) Thore Horve, was told of the German naval advance through Danish waters and of the sinking of the 5,261 GRT clandestine German troop transport Rio de Janeiro by the Polish submarine Orzeł outside the southern port of Lillesand. In the same time period reports started coming in over the radio of British mining operations off the Norwegian coast.

After receiving this information, Captain Horve had several personal telephone conversation with Rear admiral Carsten Tank-Nielsen, the Commander of the 2nd Naval District, who told him that he had ordered the navy's ships in Bergen to open fire at any and all foreign warships that might try to force their way into that port. The rear admiral gave him permission to use his own judgement in the coming hours. The conversation left Horve in no doubt that war was coming and he therefore ordered his ship to be made ready for war, guards to be posted, all leaves to be cancelled and the lights on the ship and in the harbour area to be blacked out.

During the night of 9 April, Draug was patrolling and watching shipping in the Karmsund. At about 02:00, Horve was notified that Oslofjord Fortress was engaging an unknown enemy force in the Oslofjord, leading to the crew being ordered to full combat stations. At 04:00, an unknown ship, flying no national flag, was observed sailing northwards through the Karmsund. The ship refused to stop after both flares and warning shots had been fired and Draug had to give chase and capture the vessel. After leading the unknown ship into Haugesund, its identity was found to be the 7,624 ton German vessel Main, with papers claiming she was carrying a cargo of 7,000 tons of coke to Bergen. When Draug's second-in-command, Lieutenant Østervold, tried to inspect the cargo, however, he was refused by the German captain, all entrances to the cargo hold also being blocked off to make a proper search impossible. In response, the inspecting officer decided to take the ship under arrest and sealed the radio room. The cargo hidden on board Main later turned out to have consisted of provisions and matériel for the invading German forces at Trondheim, chiefly some 2,000 naval mines

While Østervold was attempting to inspect Main's cargo, Captain Horve had a telephone conversation with Captain Aarstad at the Navy Command at Marineholmen in Bergen. Aarstad informed him that he had been taken prisoner and could not give Horve any orders. Soon after the conversation, a Royal Norwegian Navy Air Service M.F.11 patrol bomber seaplane landed in the harbour and its pilot reported that German ships, U-boats and aircraft were in the area and that the city of Stavanger had most likely been occupied.

Horve decided to take the enemy ship as a prize and bring it to a British port. Since Draug had almost no anti-aircraft weapons to speak of, and the skies were full of enemy aircraft, the destroyer could do little good by remaining where she was. He ignored an order from Naval Command to go to the Hardangerfjord and block German naval forces from gaining access to that fjord. As Horve knew that the Naval Command headquarters in Bergen had been captured by the German invaders, he assumed that the order was false, although it later turned out it was not. When ordered to steer his ship towards Britain, the captain of Main refused, only yielding after the Norwegian warship fired several warning shots and threatened to torpedo him.

After the two ships had left Haugesund at about 09:00 on 9 April, they soon came under attack from a Luftwaffe bomber around 40 nautical miles (74 km) off the Norwegian coast. The bombs, aimed at Main, missed but the German captain immediately scuttled his vessel and ordered his crew to abandon ship. As the order came very suddenly the evacuation was carried out with some panic, the boatswain drowning in the process. After the German sailors had boarded and lowered their life boat Draug fired eight to ten rounds into the waterline of the scuttled merchantman to ensure that she would sink.

Now carrying sixty-seven German sailors along as PoWs in addition to her own crew of seventy-two, Draug sped away towards Sullom Voe in the Shetland Islands. The prisoners were kept on the open deck during the crossing. By the next morning she was met by three of the Royal Navy's Tribal-class destroyers. Two of the British ships, HMS Sikh and HMS Matabele, followed Draug into Sullom Voe, arriving at 17:00 local time on 10 April, where the German PoWs were handed over to British authorities. Thereafter Draug sailed to Scapa Flow, escorted by the French destroyer Boulonnais, arriving at 10:00 on 11 April. The German prisoners from Main departed Sullom Voe for Kirkwall at 20:00 on 10 April on the French destroyer Brestois before the French ship proceeded to Scapa Flow.

After arriving in the United Kingdom, many members of Draug's crew were transferred to Royal Navy ships and would serve aboard them during the remainder of the Norwegian Campaign. Draug's second-in-command, Lieutenant Østervold served as a liaison officer aboard the British light cruiser HMS Manchester during the April–May 1940 Namsos landings in Mid-Norway. The Chief Engineer on board, Kapteinløytnant (Lieutenant) B. M. Frimannslund, was left in command of the ship with 10-20 technical staff remaining to do maintenance work. At 18:00 on 7 May 1940 Draug departed Scapa Flow for Portsmouth.

=== Service in the United Kingdom ===
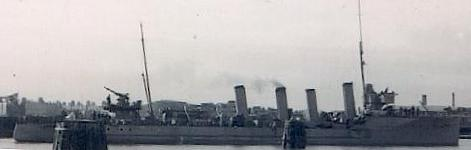
Draug at Scapa Flow in 1940, with new anti-aircraft armament

For the rest of her war service, Draug escorted coastal convoys and provided local defence in the south of England. After arrival in the United Kingdom Draug's aft 76 mm gun was removed and replaced with a 3" anti-aircraft cannon, and two .303 Lewis anti-aircraft machine guns were installed, one on each of the bridge wings. A degaussing cable was placed on the hull to demagnetize the ship and counter magnetic mines.

The first role of Draug in the United Kingdom was to serve as mother ship in Portsmouth for the newest additions to the Royal Norwegian Navy, the two motor torpedo boats MTB 5 and MTB 6, until 5 August 1940. These two boats had been ordered before the invasion of Norway, but were only handed over in May 1940, well after the German landings.

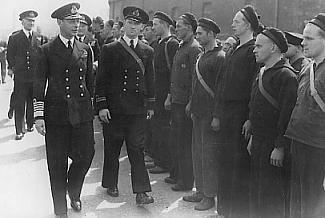
The crew being inspected by the British king, George VI at Portsmouth in May 1940

During the critical autumn of 1940, when a German invasion of Britain seemed inevitable, the antiquated destroyer was deployed as a Guard Destroyer to Lowestoft from 6 August to 27 October 1940 (Pennant No. H.28). In this role, she relatively often used her newly installed anti-aircraft weapons during air raids. Draug was repeatedly the direct target of German bombers during this time, but escaped damage.

Between November 1940 and early 1941, Draug was rearmed, rebuilt and modernized at the shipyard in Grimsby. Amongst the changes made, her bridge was reconstructed and the fore funnel removed, probably to reduce the weight on the deck. During her time in Grimsby she also escorted coastal convoys and patrolled the Humber estuary. While patrolling the Humber she was on one occasion attacked by a German Heinkel He 111 bomber, first by strafing, then with bombs. The bombs missed their target by some 400 metres, and only one sailor had been slightly wounded during the strafing attacks. Draug had returned fire with her anti-aircraft weaponry, although the 3" gun had jammed after the first few rounds and the anti-aircraft machine guns had failed to inflict serious damage on the attacking aircraft.

After the initial invasion scare had passed, Draug spent most of her time up until April 1942 escorting coastal convoys off the coast of Southern England.

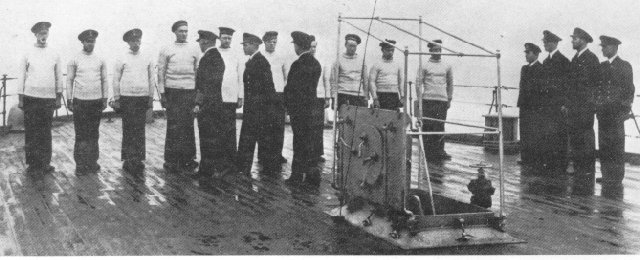
The crew of MTB 56 lined up on board Draug

In addition to her coastal duties, Draug also carried out more unconventional operations, such as towing Norwegian motor torpedo boats to and from the coast of southern Norway. This greatly increased the range of the small MTBs, thus allowing them to carry out attacks on German-controlled convoys in the occupied homeland. The first attack made by a Norwegian MTB in Norwegian waters happened on 3 October 1941, when MTB 56 was towed into position by Draug and proceeded to torpedo and sink off Kyrholmen the escorted 3,015 ton Norwegian tanker MT Borgny of Oslo, which had been requisitioned by the Germans and was carrying 3,500 tons of aviation fuel for the Luftwaffe in Norway. After the successful attack MTB 56 dodged shells from both the escorts and a coastal battery at Korsneset and met Draug the next morning to be towed back to Lerwick in Shetland. Fourteen Norwegian sailors died on Borgny, which was escorted by two German naval vessels at the time of the attack.

From April 1942 until her decommissioning 5 February 1943, Draug was used as a depot ship in Port Edgar for personnel of the Royal Norwegian Navy.

Even though officially decommissioned from the Royal Norwegian Navy, Draug continued serving the allied cause. From 5 February to 2 September, she was on loan to the Royal Navy for special exercises and trials. The final decommissioning came on 19 November 1943 and she was sold for scrapping in 1944.

Three of the 7.6 cm guns from Draug were sent to the Norwegian Arctic archipelago Svalbard in mid-1944. The three guns were landed at Longyearbyen on 20 June 1944 and formed the main defence weapons of the coal mining town. Installed in overbuilt protected positions, the guns from Draug replaced three 10 cm Bofors guns originally from the destroyer Sleipner. The 10 cm guns had been destroyed in the successful German attack on Svalbard on 8 September 1943.

== Bibliography ==
- Abelsen, Frank (1986). Norwegian naval ships 1939–1945 (in Norwegian and English). Oslo: Sem & Stenersen AS. ISBN 82-7046-050-8.
- Berg, Ole F. (1997). I skjærgården og på havet – Marinens krig 8. april 1940 – 8. mai 1945 (in Norwegian). Oslo: Marinens krigsveteranforening. ISBN 82-993545-2-8.
- Bjørnsson, Nils (1994). Å være eller ikke være – Under orlogsflagget i den annen verdenskrig (in Norwegian). Haakonsvern: Sjømilitære Samfund ved Forlaget Norsk Tidsskrift for Sjøvesen. ISBN 82-990969-3-6.
- Hansen, Ola Bøe, ed. (2005). Sjøkrigens skjebner – deres egne beretninger (in Norwegian). Gjøvik: Sjømilitære Samfund ved Forlaget Norsk Tidsskrift for Sjøvesen. ISBN 82-92217-22-3.
- Melien, Tor Jørgen (1995). Vakt og vern : marinen og kystartilleriet 1914–1918 (in Norwegian). Oslo: Institutt for forsvarsstudier.
- Sivertsen, Svein Carl, ed. (2001). Sjøforsvaret dag for dag 1814–2000 (in Norwegian). Hundvåg: Sjømilitære Samfund ved Norsk Tidsskrift for Sjøvesen. ISBN 82-92217-03-7.
- Ulvensøen, Jon (1991). Brennpunkt Nord – Værtjenestekrigen 1940–45 (in Norwegian). Oslo: Norwegian Armed Forces Museum. ISBN 82-991167-5-9.
