= HNoMS Draug =

Two ships of the Royal Norwegian Navy have borne the name HNoMS Draug, after the sea revenant Draugr:

- HNoMS Draug (1908) was a Draug-class destroyer launched in 1908 and sold for scrapping in 1944.
- HNoMS Draug (K676) was the ex-Canadian River-class frigate HMCS Penetang launched in 1944 and transferred to the Royal Norwegian Navy in 1956. Scrapped in 1966.
