= HNoMS Storm (1898) =

Norwegian torpedo boat

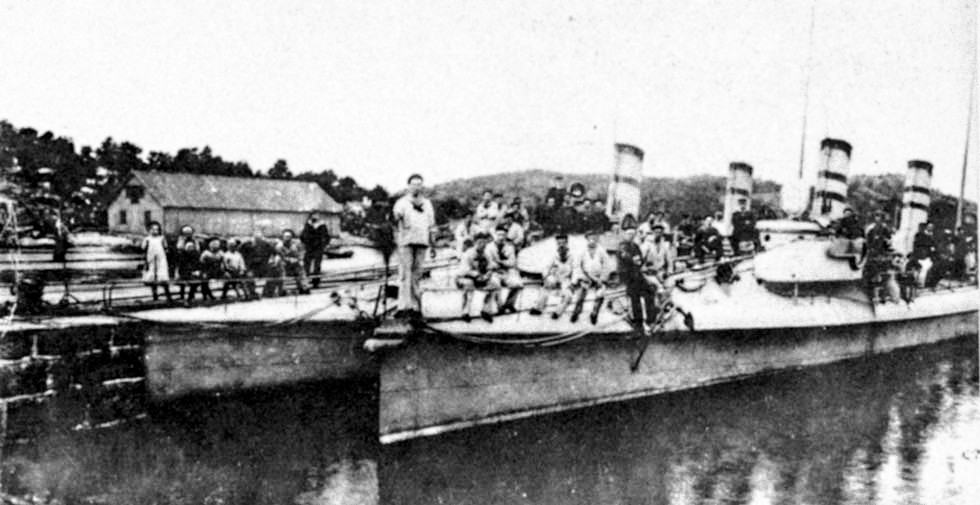
- Storm (right) at Marvika naval base in 1903

History

Norway
- Name: Storm
- Namesake: Storm
- Builder: The Royal Norwegian Navy Shipyard at Karljohansvern in Horten
- Yard number: 79
- Launched: 1 June 1898
- Fate: Sank on 13 April 1940, after striking a skerry on 12 April

General characteristics
- Class & type: 1. class torpedo boat
- Displacement: 107 tons
- Length: 39.9 metres (130.91 ft)
- Beam: 4.9 metres (16.08 ft)
- Draught: 2.7 metres (8 ft 10.30 in)
- Propulsion: 1,100 indicated horsepower triple expansion steam engine
- Speed: 21 knots (38.89 km/h; 24.17 mph)
- Range: 900 nautical miles (1,666.80 km; 1,035.70 mi) at 12 knots (22.22 km/h; 13.81 mph) or; 500 nautical miles (926.00 km; 575.39 mi) at 16 knots (29.63 km/h; 18.41 mph)
- Complement: 19 officers and men
- Armament: 2 × 37 mm QF guns; 2 × 45 cm torpedo tubes

Service record
- Part of: 4th Torpedo Boat Division (2nd Naval District)
- Commanders: Captain Oppegaard (1900); Lieutenant Thorleif Pettersen (1940)
- Operations: Norwegian campaign

HNoMS Storm was a 1.-class torpedo boat constructed in 1898. Storm served the Royal Norwegian Navy for almost 42 years, including neutrality protection duties during the First World War. She was lost in the 1940 Norwegian campaign of the Second World War. During the Norwegian Campaign, she was the only Norwegian warship that launched a torpedo against the invading Germans.

== Design and construction ==
Following the successful introduction of the small coastal 2. class torpedo boats in the 1880s, the Royal Norwegian Navy decided to acquire a new class of larger torpedo boats, to carry out offensive operations at sea. The new warships, designated as 1. class torpedo boats, were introduced in 1896 with the purchase of three boats from the Schichau-Werke in Germany. A further seven boats of the class were built in Norway in 1898–1901, at the Royal Norwegian Navy Shipyard at Karljohansvern in Horten.

The class was considered reasonably seaworthy, although it was also found to be difficult to accurately fire torpedoes from the 1. class vessels in anything but calm seas. The German-built vessels, as well as the first three Norwegian-built ships, were criticized for having insufficient manoeuvrability, a design issue that was addressed in the final four vessels built. The class was also considered to have very poor ventilation, especially in the engine compartment.

The bridge of the 1. class torpedo boats was located in a turret near the bow. Visibility from the turret was poor and the commander would often remain outside, relying on another crew member to stand at the wheel and follow his directions. The class could carry 17 tons of coal for fuel, and had a range of 900 nautical miles (1,666.80 km; 1,035.70 mi) at 12 knots (22.22 km/h; 13.81 mph) or 500 nautical miles (926.00 km; 575.39 mi) at 16 knots (29.63 km/h; 18.41 mph).

Storm was the first of the 1. class torpedo boats to be built in Norway, as the first ship of a series of three constructed in 1898. She had yard number 79 at Karljohansvern, and was launched on 1 June 1898. A 107-ton vessel, she had a length of 39.9 metres (130.91 ft), a beam of 4.9 metres (16.08 ft) and a draught of 2.7 metres (8 ft 10.30 in). Storm was powered by a 1,100 indicated horsepower triple expansion steam engine, which gave her a top speed of 21 knots (38.89 km/h; 24.17 mph).

Storm was armed with two quick-firing 37 mm guns and two 45 cm torpedo tubes, and was manned by a crew of 19 officers and men.

== Early service ==
Storm and the fellow 1. class torpedo boats Brand, Delfin and Trods, took part in the 1900 summer fleet exercises, embarking on a cruise to Kiel in Germany and Marstrand in Sweden along with the coastal defence ships Harald Haarfagre and Tordenskjold, and the gunboat Frithjof. The exercises in 1900 focused on developing the coordination between the coastal defence ships and the torpedo boats, as the two main weapon systems of the Royal Norwegian Navy. During the cruise Storm was under the command of Captain Oppegaard. Around 10 torpedo boats were equipped annually for unit exercises in the years up until the outbreak of the First World War.

== First World War ==
In the lead-up to the First World War, the Royal Norwegian Navy mobilized. The mobilization was initiated on 2 August 1914 and initially completed on 5 August 1914. The Norwegian torpedo boats were scattered along the coast from the Oslofjord to Trøndelag, and took the brunt of the neutrality protection duties. The main task of the Royal Norwegian Navy's ships during the war was to confront foreign warships that approached Norwegian territorial waters, and by their presence to try to discourage neutrality violations.

Storm was based in Naare in Western Norway during the war, and in May 1915 carried out torpedo firing exercises together with other torpedo boats. From 1917 to 1919, Storm was under the command of South Pole explorer First Lieutenant Hjalmar Fredrik Gjertsen.

== Inter-war years ==
The Royal Norwegian Navy's ships suffered much wear and tear during the First World War and many were decommissioned in 1920, including 14 torpedo boats. Most of the remaining vessels were mothballed. With the introduction of the larger and more modern three-ship Trygg class in 1919–1921, most of the old torpedo boats remained inactive, and nine of them were rebuilt as patrol boats. Storm was one of only 14 pre-First World War torpedo boats to remain with the Royal Norwegian Navy until 1939.

== Second World War ==
=== Neutrality protection ===
At the outbreak of the Second World War in September 1939, the Royal Norwegian Navy again mobilized. The torpedo boats were organized into five divisions and again spread along the coastline from the Oslofjord to Trøndelag.

Storm formed part of the 4th Torpedo Boat Division of the 2nd Naval District, along with her fellow 1. class torpedo boats Sæl and Brand. As was the case with the other Norwegian torpedo boat units, the vessels of the 4th Torpedo Boat Division operated individually along the coast, protecting Norwegian shipping and guarding against neutrality violations. During the first months of the war Norwegian neutrality was repeatedly breached by both warring sides, most dramatically by the Royal Navy in the February 1940 Altmark Incident.

On 29 September 1939, the Norwegian merchant navy suffered its first loss to a U-boat, when the England-bound Takstaas was stopped by the German U-boat U-7 and torpedoed and shelled after the crew abandoned ship. The lumber-carrying cargo ship broke in two, the bow section sinking and the stern section remaining afloat to be salvaged later. Following the attack, the crew sailed towards the Norwegian coast in two lifeboats. Shortly after the incident, the lifeboats were spotted by a seaplane of the Royal Norwegian Navy Air Service. Storm was directed to the scene, and took the lifeboats under tow to Sund Municipality near Bergen.

=== German invasion ===
When the Germans invaded Norway on 9 April 1940, Storm was patrolling near Buarøy off Bergen under the command of Lieutenant Thorleif Pettersen. (Note: Thorleif Pettersen served with the Norwegian Armed Forces in exile after the end of the Norwegian Campaign, amongst other ships on the destroyer Arendal, and ended his naval career decades later as a rear admiral.) This made Storm the only Norwegian torpedo boat to be ready for action at the time of the German attack; all the 16 other torpedo boats were either in port, in transit or undergoing repairs.

On 9 April 1940, Storm was guarding the approaches to Bergen, a restricted naval port, and was under orders to fire at any intruder. Reports of foreign warships moving against Norway had motivated the naval commander in Bergen, Rear-Admiral Carsten Tank-Nielsen to put his forces on a war footing. Lieutenant Pettersen had suggested to Admiral Tank-Nielsen placing his vessel at the outer line of the restricted area, with further forces closer to Bergen. Before reaching the area covered by Storm, any intruders would have to pass a line of small patrol boats with the task of identifying incoming ships and reporting back to Tank-Nielsen. By 22:00 on 8 April, Storm was in position to defend the Bergen approaches.

When the German task force detailed to capture Bergen arrived at the Lerøyosen approaches around 02:00, the advancing warships were illuminated by searchlights at the outlying Lerøy Fort. At 02:20 Storm fired her bow torpedo at the last of the intruding ships, most likely the E-boat support ship Carl Peters, at a range of 1,200 metres (3,937.01 ft). The torpedo fired by Storm missed and failed to detonate. Lieutenant Pettersen overestimated the speed of the incoming German ships, and the torpedo passed in front of the target. The torpedo was found by Storm later in the day and destroyed. The German task force pushed on towards Bergen, seizing the city after a battle with the coastal artillery batteries there. Following the attack, the German E-boats S-21 and S-24 attempted to intercept Storm, but the Norwegian torpedo boat managed to evade them. In the opinion of Lieutenant Pettersen, expressed in a post-war report, the torpedo had hit its target, but failed to explode.

The unsuccessful attack on the German task force made Storm the only Norwegian warship to launch a torpedo in anger during the Norwegian Campaign.

Storm next attempted to set up another attack farther north, but the German task force advanced through the area before the torpedo boat could get into position. Following the unsuccessful defence of the Bergen approaches, and a further unsuccessful search for incoming German troop ships, Storm left the area later in the day and steamed south to Bømlo. (Note: Of the two other torpedo boats defending Bergen, Sæl also attempted to intercept the German task force, but failed to get into a favourable attack position, encountering the German ships at too close range for a torpedo attack. The commander of Brand on his part decided not to attack the German task force, as it was daylight by the time he spotted the intruding ships.) She remained hidden at Bømlo for the next three days.

=== Loss ===
Following the German capture of Bergen on 9 April 1940, the Royal Norwegian Navy in Western Norway reorganized to defend the surrounding fjords from further German advances. On 12 April, Storm was ordered to redeploy to Uskedal in the Hardangerfjord, and join other Norwegian warships in the defence of that area. On her way to Uskedal in the evening of 12 April, Storm struck a skerry at Stangholmene at 20:55 and sprang a leak. She turned around, and was beached stern first at Godøy. At 22:30 on 13 April, Storm capsized and sank at great depth.

Before Storm went down, her crew managed to remove much of the arms and ammunition on board. The crew members later joined the forces gathered in Uskedal.
