= Urban Jacob Rasmus Børresen =

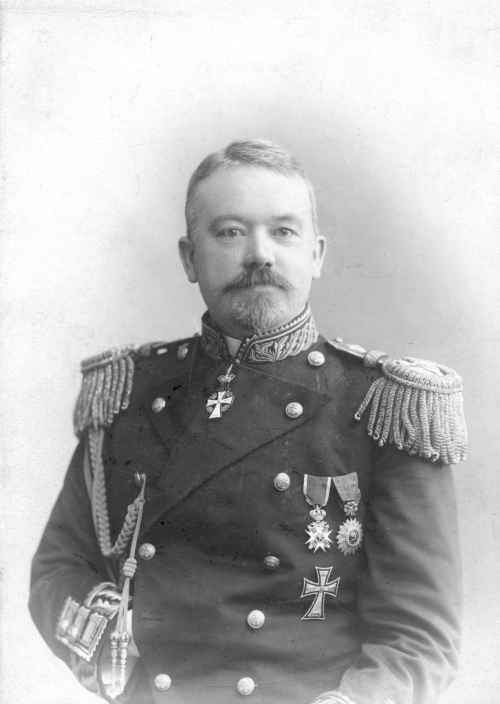
Urban Jacob Rasmus Børresen

Urban Jacob Rasmus Børresen (June 2, 1857 – January 18, 1943) was a Norwegian rear admiral and industry leader.

== Early life and family ==
Børresen was born in Drammen to the shipowner Otto Mejlænder Børresen (1828–1880) and Martha Christine Lyng (1825–1890). He attended the military college from 1882 to 1883 and the Technische Hochschule in Charlottenburg (now Technische Universität Berlin). In 1884 he married Louise Levick (1859–1921) in Philadelphia.

== Naval career ==
Børresen was made commander of the gunboat Vale in 1894. From 1894 to 1896 he was manager of the nautical school in Kristiania, from 1896 to 1898 a duty officer for the naval command general staff, and in 1897 commander of the torpedo boat destroyer Valkyrjen and the torpedo boat division. In 1898 he became commander of the gunboat Sleipner, and from 1898 to 1900 he was a department head with the naval command general staff. He became a rear admiral with the naval general staff in 1899 and in 1905 a member of the admiralty staff, where he served until 1910. He was a temporary commanding admiral in 1900 and 1901, and became commander of the Skagerrak squadron in 1905.

In addition to his naval career, from 1890 to 1895 Børresen edited the Norsk Tidsskrift for Sjøvesenet (Norwegian Journal of Nautical Affairs). His publications included Tordenskjold (1901), Den russisk-japanske krig (The Russo-Japanese War; three vols., 1904–1905), Fra dekksgutt til officer (From Deckhand to Officer; 1929), En verdensdame i orienten (A Woman of the World in the Orient; 1931), and the memoirs I storm og solgangsvær (In Storm and Diurnal Wind; 1936). In addition to these titles, he published a number of other books on various topics.

Børresen became known internationally for a number of inventions, including an orograph (a sighting instrument for coastal artillery), a torpedo virator (a guidance system for torpedoes), and work on a tactical system for armored ships. His tactical system was studied by navies in the United Kingdom, France, and the German Empire, and under Børresen's supervision was tested for use in the Swedish Navy during patrol exercises in the Baltic Sea in 1903. Børresen claimed that Imperial Japanese Navy Admiral Tōgō Heihachirō used his tactical system when he defeated the Imperial Russian Navy in the Battle of Tsushima in the Russo-Japanese War in May 1905.

During the crisis associated with the dissolution of the union between Norway and Sweden in the summer and fall of 1905, Børresen was the chief commander of the armored ships department and, after the navy was mobilized on September 13, he became commander of the navy's main force, the Skagerrak squadron. Disagreement with Commanding Admiral Christian Sparre over how naval vessels should be used in the case of war with Sweden led to the bitter Admiral Conflict (Norwegian: Admiralstriden). The conflict persisted until 1910, when a tribunal was created for the matter in the upper house of the Norwegian parliament. The tribunal ruled that Admiral Sparre had to resign as commanding admiral; at the same time, Børresen was criticized for his actions in 1905 to the point that he was also compelled to resign.

== Industrial career ==
Børresen was also involved in establishing and managing many large industrial enterprises. As a close friend of Sam Eyde, Børresen was already engaged in industry in Norway in 1904. After resigning from his naval career, he pursued a full-time career in industry. Among other projects, he helped found the Norsk Hydro company and was at various times on the management board of the Meraker Smelting Works, the Evje Nickel Works, and the Kristiansand Nickel Refining Works, as well as several other industrial companies. His industrial career ended in ruin in 1920, when Børresen was one of the main figures in the "Nickel scandal" (Norwegian: nikkelaffæren).

Børresen was also a notable fiction author during his lifetime, and he also wrote books on military theory.

== Awards ==
Børresen was honored with a number of Norwegian and other awards for his work. He was named a knight of the Order of St. Olav in 1900. In 1910 he was elevated to a commander with star in the same order for military merit. Børresen was awarded the 1906 Coronation Medal in silver and the King Haakon VII 1905–1930 Jubilee Medal. Other awards include the grand cross of the Royal Order of Cambodia, commander of the Order of the Dannebrog, commander of the British Royal Victorian Order, commander of the French Legion of Honour, the Prussian Order of the Crown, commander of the Swedish Order of the Sword, and the Tunisian Order of Glory (fourth class).

== Legacy ==
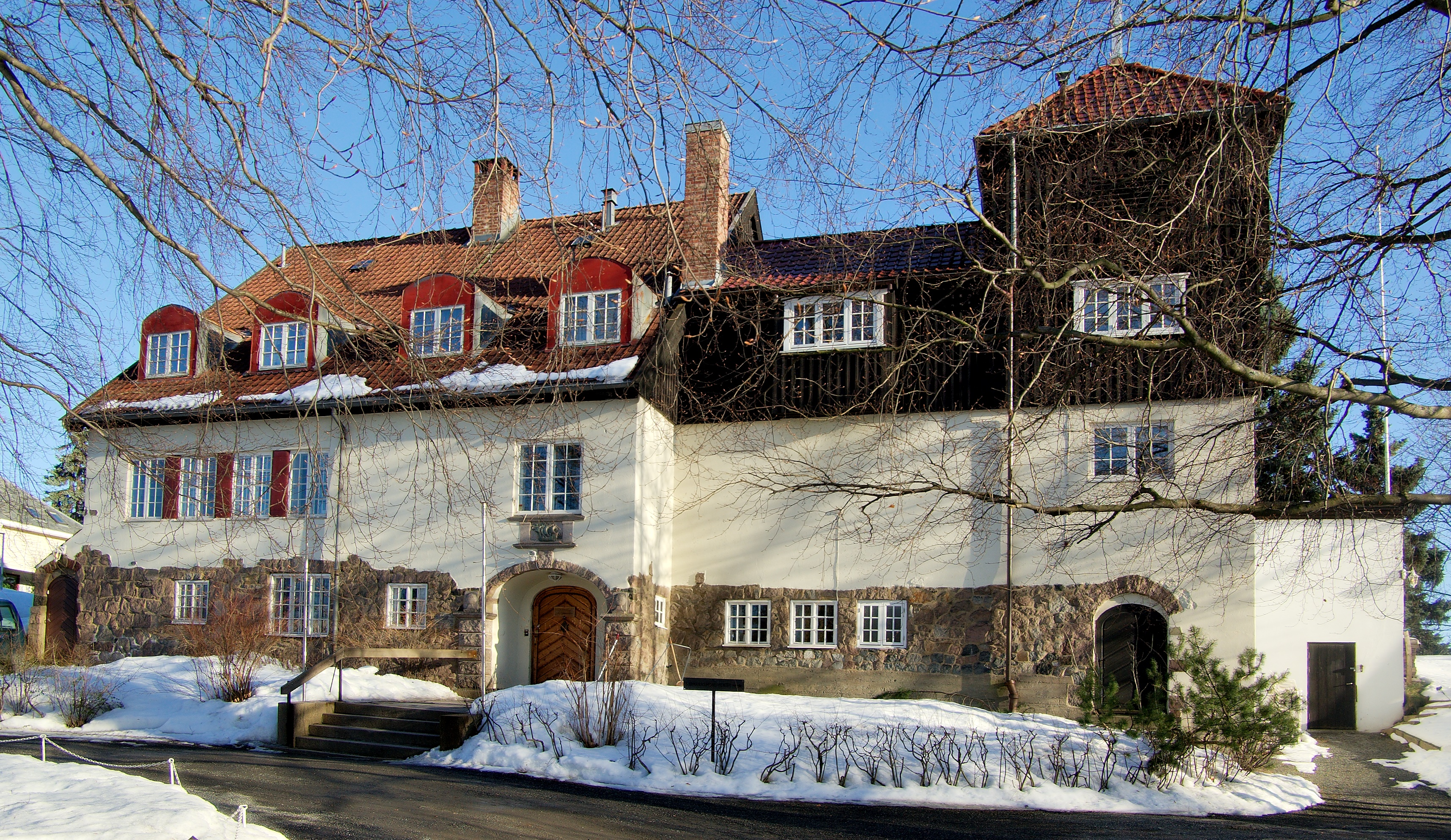
Oslo Seamen's Church

Admiral Børresen Street (Admiral Børresens vei) on the Bygdøy peninsula in Oslo is named after Børresen. Børresen's house on the street now serves as the Oslo Seamen’s Church.

== Bibliography ==
- Tordenskiold. En karakterstudie (Tordenskjold: A Character Study; 1901)
- En brist i karakteren (A Shortcoming in Character; 1902)
- Eventyr (Adventure; 1903)
- Med Kong Oscar II nordenfor polarcirkelen 1903 (With Kong Oscar II North of the Arctic Circle in 1903; 1904)
- Den russisk-japanske krig (The Russo-Japanese War; 1904–05)
- Skygger: Skuespill i tre akter (Shadows: A Play in Three Acts; 1910)
- En kaperkaptein fra Napoleonstiden: Surcoufs liv og eventyr berettet efter franske kilder (A Privateer Captain of the Napoleonic Era: Surcouf's Life and Adventures Narrated Based on French Sources; 1926)
- Den store krise (roman) (The Great Crisis (A Novel); 1927)
- Sjøløitnant Hurrys eventyr i den nordamerikanske frihedskamp (Lieutenant Hurry's Adventure in the North American War of Independence; 1927)
- Fra dekksgutt til officer (From Deckhand to Officer; 1929)
- Sjøløitnant Merry: På den norske kyst i Napoleonskrigen (Lieutenant Merry: On the Norwegian Coast in the Napoleonic Wars; 1930)
- En verdensdame i orienten (A Woman of the World in the Orient; 1931)
- I storm og solgangsvær. Erindringer av Admiral J. Børresen (In Storm and Diurnal Wind: Memoirs of Admiral J. Børresen; 1936)
- Sjømenn som legger opp eller Bryllupet på Husaker: syngespill med musikk av Reidar Thommesen (Sailors that Lay Up or the Wedding at Husak: A Singspiel Featuring Music by Reidar Thommesen; 1937)
- Historien og Forsvaret (History and Defense; 1938)
