= Thore Horve =

Norwegian naval officer and businessperson

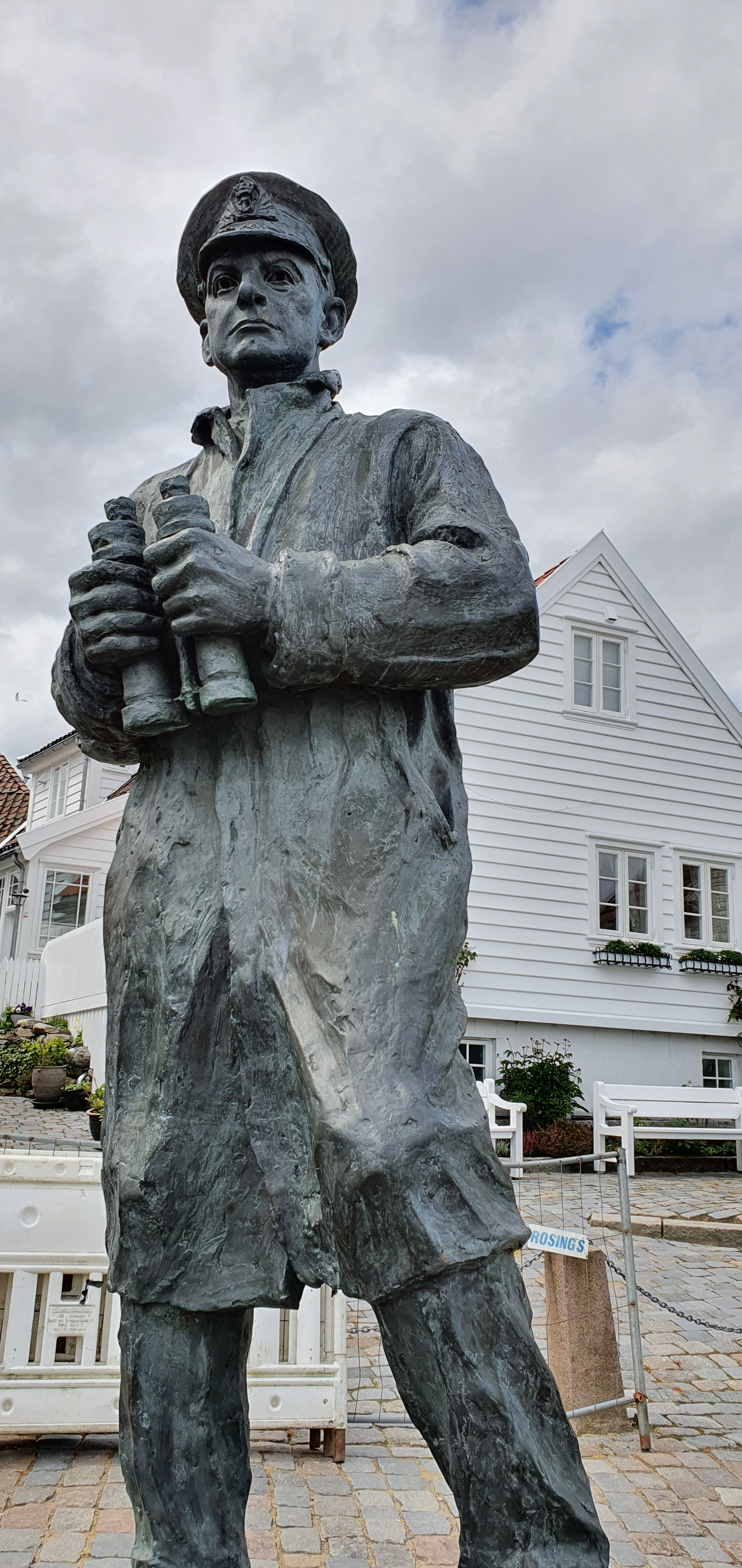
- Born: 6 October 1899; Former Hetland Municipality near Stavanger, Norway.
- Died: 15 August 1990 (aged 90); Oslo, Norway
- Awards: War Cross with Sword

Thore Horve (6 October 1899 – 15 August 1990) was a Norwegian naval officer and businessperson. He is best known for his naval commands and efforts during World War II, for leading the Royal Norwegian Navy from 1946 to 1949 and in 1951, and for his work to compensate war sailors many years later.

== Early life and career ==
He was born in Hetland Municipality. He graduated from the Norwegian Naval Academy in 1920 and served on various ships. In 1927 he married Bergljot Sollie (1903–1994), daughter of politician Harald Bredo Sollie.

== World War II ==
When Nazi Germany attacked Norway in April 1940, setting off war, Lt. Cdr. Horve was the commander of HNoMS Draug. During the night of 9 April, Draug was patrolling and watching shipping in the Karmsundet. At about 0200hrs, Horve was notified that Oslofjord Fortress was engaging an unknown enemy force in the Oslofjord, leading to the crew being ordered to full combat stations. At 0400hrs, an unknown ship, flying no national flag, was observed sailing northwards through the Karmsund. The ship refused to stop after both flares and warning shots had been fired and Draug had to give chase and capture the vessel. After leading the unknown ship into Haugesund, its identity was found to be the 7,624 ton German vessel Main. The two ships left Haugesund at about 0900hrs, but soon came under attack from a Luftwaffe bomber around 40 nautical miles (74 km) off the Norwegian coast. The bombs, aimed at the Main, missed but the German captain immediately scuttled his vessel and ordered his crew to abandon ship.

Horve remained commander of Draug until 3 November 1941. He was also commander of HNoMS Sleipner from 28 June 1940 to December 1941. He subsequently had command of Glaisdale. He worked in the Royal Norwegian Navy High Command in London from 1941 to 1942, headed the Norwegian MTB Flotilla in Shetland from 1943 to 1944, and worked again at the Navy High Command from 1944 to 1945 and the Navy Special Service (Marinens Spesialtjeneste) in 1945.

== Post-war career ==
After the war ended in May 1945, Horve was chief of staff of the Navy Command of Southern Norway briefly, and then head of the planning department of the Navy High Command. He reached the ranks of Counter Admiral in 1946 and Vice Admiral in 1947, and from 1946 to 1949 Horve headed the entire Royal Norwegian Navy. He then headed the Navy Command of Northern Norway from 1949 to 1951, and the Royal Norwegian Navy again in 1951. He resigned in the same year in protest of Defence Minister Jens Christian Hauge's political priorities, which Horve felt had given the Royal Norwegian Navy an inferior role within NATO (of which Norway was a founding member in 1949).

Horve retired, working in the kelp harvesting company Protan from 1951 to 1954. From 1954 he worked served as Commander of the Imperial Ethiopian Coastguard, pending the establishment of the Imperial Ethiopian Navy, a project aided by the Norwegian state, but resigned in 1956. The reason was that the project did not go in the preferred direction. From 1961 to 1964 he was the CEO of Philips Norway. Also, in the 1960s Horve picked up the work to improve the treatment of Norwegian war sailors. The work had been started by sailors such as Leif Vetlesen, but stagnated. Horve's work for the war sailors bore fruits in that the Parliament of Norway granted payments to crew in the merchant fleet Nortraship in 1972. To Horve's dismay naval sailors did not benefit.

Horve died in August 1990 in Oslo, almost 91 years old.

== Orders and decorations ==
He was decorated with the following orders and decorations:

- War Cross with Sword 1942
- Commander with Star of the Order of St. Olav 1947.
- War Medal (Norway)
- Defence Medal 1940–1945 (Deltagermedaljen 9. april 1940 - 8. mai 1945) (Norway)
- Haakon VII 70th Anniversary Medal (Norway)
- Grand Cross of the Order of Dannebrog 6.10.1947 (Denmark)
- Grand Cross of the Order of the Star of Ethiopia (Ethiopia)
- Grand Officer of the Order of the Legion of Honour (France)
- War Cross (Croix de guerre) 1939-1945 (France)
- Commander of the Order of the Sword (Sweden)
- Commander of the Most Excellent of the Order British Empire (CBE) - military (United Kingdom)
- Distinguished Service Cross (DSC) (United Kingdom)
- Mention in Dispatches (MID) (United Kingdom)
- Officer of the Legion of Merit (USA)
