= HNoMS Sæl =

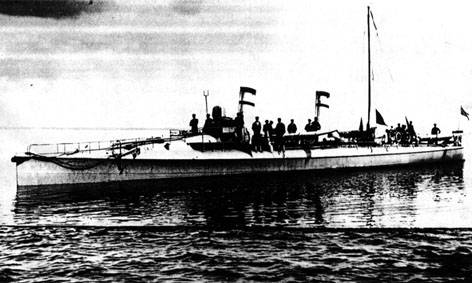
- Sæl showing her two funnels and cigar-shaped hull

History

Norway
- Name: Sæl
- Namesake: Pinniped
- Builder: The Royal Norwegian Navy Shipyard in Horten
- Yard number: 85
- Launched: 25 September 1901
- Commissioned: 1901
- Out of service: 18 April 1940
- Fate: Sunk in action with three German E-boats at Ånuglo in the Hardangerfjord.

Service record
- Part of: 4th Torpedo boat Division in the 2nd Naval District
- Commanders: Ensign L. Gulbrandsen (1940)
- Operations: Norwegian Campaign
- Victories: 1 E-boat damaged

General characteristics
- Class & type: 1. class
- Displacement: 107 tons
- Length: 39.9 m (130.91 ft)
- Beam: 4.9 m (16.08 ft)
- Draft: 2.7 m (8.86 ft)
- Propulsion: 1,100 hp triple expansion steam engine
- Speed: 21 knots (38.89 km/h)
- Range: 900 nautical miles (1,666.80 km); at 12 knots (22.22 km/h) or; 500 nautical miles (926.00 km); at 16 knots (29.63 km/h)
- Complement: 20 men
- Armament: 2 × 37 mm QF guns; 1 × 7.92 mm Colt anti-aircraft machine gun; 2 × 45 cm torpedo launchers
- Notes: All the above listed information, unless otherwise noted, was acquired from

HNoMS Sæl was the penultimate vessel of the ten 1. class torpedo boats of the Royal Norwegian Navy. She was built at the Royal Norwegian Navy Shipyard in Horten in 1901, with yard number 85. She was to see close to 40 years service with the Royal Norwegian Navy, taking part in the preparations for war in connection with the dissolution the union with Sweden in 1905, enforcing Norwegian neutrality during the First World War and opposing the German invasion of Norway in 1940. She was lost in battle with Kriegsmarine vessels at Ånuglo in the Hardangerfjord on 18 April 1940.

== Name ==
Sæl is the pre-1917 Reform Bokmål version of the Norwegian word sel, meaning seal.

== Characteristics ==
Sæl was reasonably seaworthy in calm seas, with little engine noise and no bow water. The intent behind her design was to enable her to attack enemy shipping in both open seas and close to shore with the least possible chance of being spotted before launching torpedoes at her targets. The 37 mm gun armament was placed one on each side of the ship, making it impossible for both her QF guns to fire at one target simultaneously.

== Early career ==
=== Tension with Sweden ===
Having been launched as the penultimate of the ten 1. class torpedo boats built for the Royal Norwegian Navy, HNoMS Sæl was amongst the front-line RNoN units mobilised in connection with the tense political conditions between Norway and Sweden as the Norwegians dissolved the 91-year-old personal union between the two countries.

As the two countries appeared on the brink of war in the autumn of 1905, the Royal Norwegian Navy carried out exercises involving almost its entire force. By the time the Karlstad negotiations met with success and Sweden recognised the independence of Norway on 23 October 1905, Sæl and many of the other Norwegian ships were patrolling the Oslofjord in expectation of a Swedish naval attack against the country's capital Oslo and the central military and industrial area of Eastern Norway.

=== First World War ===
During the First World War, Norway declared herself a neutral country and took no active part in the war. Sæl served throughout the war years escorting merchant ships in Norwegian waters and guarding the coast against neutrality violations. The Norwegian torpedo boats spent the war spread along the coast with orders to confront and board any warship that approached the coast of Norway, even though they might not necessarily enter Norwegian territorial waters. In the run-up to the war Sæl had been part of a large Norwegian naval manoeuvre during the International Yacht Racing Union's fourth annual Europe week sailing regatta, held in Horten 14 to 21 July 1914.

== Inter-war years ==
Among the missions given the Norwegian torpedo boat force after the First World War was apprehending rum runners during Norway's 1919–1926 prohibition. On one occasion in the autumn of 1924 the customs patrol boat Bjørnen discovered the smuggler ship Paul Weber off Halten in Sør-Trøndelag. Paul Weber was operated by a group of smugglers led by the flamboyant Paul Weber. Bjørnen called for assistance from Sæl to capture the smuggler. Sæl caught up with Paul Weber off the island of Frøya and opened fire, using live rounds, and lighted up the smuggler vessel with her searchlights. After a chase among the skerries, and numerous live warning shots, the Paul Weber surrendered to the torpedo boat.

== Second World War ==
At the outbreak of the Second World War, the close to 39-year-old Sæl and 16 other torpedo boats of three classes were taken out of reserve and mobilised in five divisions. Sæl was part of the 4th Torpedo boat Division in the 2nd Naval District together with HNoMS Storm and HNoMS Brand. The divisions were purely administrative units, with each torpedo boat spread singly on the coast from Oslofjord to Trøndelag. For the 4th Torpedo boat Division, deployed to the south western Vestlandet region, the war initially entailed coastal guard duties and hailing Norwegian merchant ships as they left Norwegian waters, handing over the latest news reports and wishing them a safe voyage.

=== Norwegian Campaign ===
==== Attempted defence of Bergen ====
In the morning of 8 April 1940, on the eve of the German invasion of Norway, Sæl was docked at the Marineholmen naval base in Bergen between patrol missions. By 02:30 on 9 April she had finished coaling, having been ordered to make war preparations the previous day, and moved south towards her blocking position in the Lerøy area in the approaches to Bergen. Due to a lack of information as the position of the intruding German forces she sailed on a collision course with the German Kampfgruppe 3. When the German ships were spotted by Sæl they were at such close range that the Norwegians had to make evasive manoeuvres to avoid a collision and were unable to launch a torpedo. As the Kriegsmarine ships passed her at only 10–15 metres distance, Sæl turned around and gave chase in the hope of catching up with the Germans and get within range for a torpedo shot. As dawn was soon approaching Sæl's commander, Fenrik (Ensign) L. Gulbrandsen, decided to disengage and temporarily place his ship in cover behind the Bratholmen islet.

==== Hardangerfjord ====
After Bergen was seized by German forces on 9 April, Sæl relocated to the Hardangerfjord to continue fighting the German invasion. She arrived at Uskedal in Kvinnherad Municipality on 12 April, and on 17 April helped a prize crew led by Fenrik Schau from the Trygg class torpedo boat HNoMS Stegg escort the captured 6,567 ton iron ore laden German cargo ship Afrika into the port of Odda. After being greeted with jubilation and singing by the local population at Odda, Sæl was ordered back to Uskedal that same evening. At Uskedal Sæl formed the Hardangerfjord Naval District (Norwegian: Hardangerfjord Sjøforsvarsavsnitt) together with the minelayer Tyr and five patrol boats.

==== Battle with German E-boats ====
The next day, 18 April, HNoMS Stegg was despatched to the Langenuen strait in Austevoll Municipality to intercept four merchant ships, leaving Sæl alone in the area. Soon afterwards, an alarm went out in Uskedal warning that three German E-boat fast attack craft were entering the Hardangerfjord. In response, district commander Orlogskaptein (Lieutenant Commander) Ulstrup – the former commander of the mine layer Tyr – gave an oral order that Sæl was to avoid contact with the superior enemy force. Ulstrup felt that the poorly armed, slow and not very manoeuvrable Sæl would not stand a chance against the three fast and modern opponents.

The fact that Ulstrup's order was given orally led to a fatal misunderstanding. By the time word reached Fenrik Gulbrandsen, he understood the order to mean that he was to attack and destroy the three E-boats. Believing to be obeying orders, Gulbrandsen sailed Sæl into the fjord to confront the German vessels.

At 16:00 the crew of the Sæl spotted two of the E-boats moving at great speed southwards from the Lukksund Narrows between Tysnesøy Island and the mainland. At a distance of 2,500 metres (8,200 ft) Sæl opened up with her bow gun and for five minutes exchanged fire with the German ships. One of the E-boats was hit by several 37 mm rounds and left dead in the water and listing to the side. Soon after, one of Sæl's guns was knocked out by a German 20 mm shell, and shortly thereafter the firing lanyard on the other gun snapped. With multiple rounds hitting the Norwegian torpedo boat's bow, the E-boats moved into point blank range, riddling Sæl from bow to stern. As the third E-boat arrived on the scene, three torpedoes were fired at Sæl, the two first going under the hull and the third hitting a small rock right in front of her. The explosion caused by the last torpedo further damaged the bow of the Norwegian ship and caused water to start flooding her. With the 7.92 mm Colt machine gun providing cover fire, Fenrik Gulbrandsen beached his vessel at full speed to save the crew. During that last manoeuvre Sæl hit an underwater rock and was left grounded with her stern sticking out of the water. At 16:25 Gulbrandsen ordered the crew to abandon ship. Although one man had suffered a lung shot and six others had minor grazing wounds, all 21 crew members made it ashore.

==== Sinking ====
Later in the evening of 18 April the crew of the Sæl attempted to moor their vessel to prevent it from slipping under. At high tide Sæl disappeared beneath the waves at Ånuglo, still flying the Norwegian war flag.

After the battle, a Norwegian motorboat brought the wounded to the hospital in Rosendal.

== The wreck today ==
The wreck of HNoMS Sæl was relocated in 1968 by the Royal Norwegian Navy's Mine Diver Command who found her at 25 metres (82 ft) depth, intact with ammunition, mines and torpedoes on board. The ammunition was removed, but the mines and torpedoes were blown up on site, resulting in the complete destruction of the torpedo boat's midsection and leaving only the bow and stern still mostly intact, making her a popular dive site.

== Bibliography ==
- Abelsen, Frank (1986). Norwegian naval ships 1939–1945 (in Norwegian and English). Oslo: Sem & Stenersen AS. ISBN 82-7046-050-8.
- Hegland, Jon Rustung; Johan Henrik Lilleheim (1998). Norske torpedobåter gjennom 125 år (in Norwegian). Hundvåg: Sjømilitære Samfund ved Norsk Tidsskrift for Sjøvesen. ISBN 82-994738-1-0.
- Johansen, Per Ole (1994). Markedet som ikke ville dø – forbudstiden og de illegale alkoholmarkedene i Norge og USA (in Norwegian). Rusmiddeldirektoratet. ISBN 82-90594-46-1.
- Sande, Aasmund Taarn (1995). April til mai – kvinnheringar i krig og okkupasjon (in Norwegian). Kvinnherad sogelag/Husnes mållag. ISBN 82-993275-1-2.
- Sivertsen, Svein Carl, ed. (2000). Med Kongen til fornyet kamp – Oppbyggingen av Marinen ute under Den andre verdenskrig (in Norwegian). Hundvåg: Sjømilitære Samfund ved Norsk Tidsskrift for Sjøvesen. ISBN 82-994738-8-8.
- Thomassen, Marius (1995). 90 år under rent norsk orlogsflagg (in Norwegian). Bergen: Eide Forlag. ISBN 82-514-0483-5.
