= Draug-class destroyer =

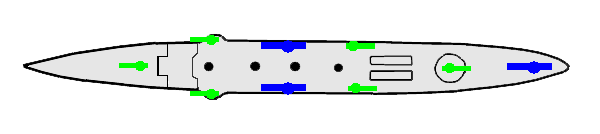
- The lead ship Draug at some point before the Second World War. Note QF guns in blisters along the side to allow forward fire.

Class overview
- Name: Draug class
- Builders: Karljohansvern Orlogsstasjon
- Operators: Royal Norwegian Navy
- Preceded by: HNoMS Valkyrjen
- Succeeded by: Sleipner class
- Planned: 3
- Completed: 3
- Lost: 1
- Scrapped: 2

General characteristics
- Type: Destroyer
- Displacement: 587 t (578 long tons)
- Length: 69.2 m (227.03 ft)
- Beam: 7.3 m (23.95 ft)
- Draught: 2.9 m (9.51 ft)
- Propulsion: 8,000 ihp (6,000 kW) VTR engines
- Speed: 26.5 knots (49.08 km/h)
- Endurance: 107 t (105 long tons) coal
- Complement: 76
- Armament: 6 × 76 mm (3 in) quick-firing guns; 3 × 457 mm (18 in) torpedo tubes

The Draug class was the first multi-vessel class of destroyers built for the Royal Norwegian Navy in the early 20th century and the first destroyers constructed for the Royal Norwegian Navy since Valkyrjen, which was commissioned on 17 May 1896. The class comprised three ships, Draug, Troll and Garm. All three were built at the Karljohansvern Orlogsstasjon. The Draug class were the last Norwegian-constructed destroyers until the Ålesund class was laid down in 1939. The Draug class saw service until the 1940s. In 1940, Garm was sunk while the other two remained in service until sold and broken up for scrap.

== Characteristics ==
The Draug class was patterned on the British River class, only somewhat larger and more heavily armed. The destroyers had a displacement of 587 tonnes (578 long tons) and were 69.2 metres (227 ft 0 in) long with a beam of 7.3 metres (23 ft 11 in) and a draught of 2.9 metres (9 ft 6 in). The destroyers had a complement of 76 officers and ratings.

The ships of the class were coal-powered vessels with a capacity of 107 tonnes (105 long tons). While Draug and Troll had vertical triple expansion steam engines driving two shafts, rated at 7,500 horsepower (5,600 kW), Garm was powered by Germania direct steam turbines, rated at 8,000 indicated horsepower (6,000 kW). Draug had a maximum speed of 26.5 knots (49.1 km/h; 30.5 mph), Troll, 27 knots (50 km/h; 31 mph) and Garm, 27.4 knots (50.7 km/h; 31.5 mph). They carried six 76-millimetre (3 in) quick-firing guns, as well as three trainable 457-millimetre (18 in) torpedo tubes.

== Ships in class ==
Construction data
Ship	Builder	Launched	Fate
Draug	Karljohansvern Orlogsstasjon	18 March 1908	Broken up in 1944
Troll	Karljohansvern Orlogsstasjon	7 July 1910	Sold in 1947 to be broken up
Garm	Karljohansvern Orlogsstasjon	27 May 1913	Sunk at Bjordal on 26 April 1940

== Service history ==
As the single Valkyrjen was not enough to fulfil the need for destroyers, the Draug class was ordered and built in the years 1908–1913. Draug was the lead ship, launched in 1908, followed by Troll| in 1909 and Garm in 1913. The class, and lead ship, was named after the Draugr – a sinister, malevolent being of Nordic origin and often connected with mariners and the sea.

All three ships were kept in commission until the Second World War, although they were mothballed years before 1939. As war became imminent, the three ships were returned to active service, Troll and Garm on 28 August, Draug on 5 September 1939. As all three ships were in poor condition, it took much time and work before they could be declared operational. After mobilisation, the Draug-class vessels were considered fit only for escort and guard service. They served with the 1st Destroyer Division based at Bergen.

On 8 April 1940, as the German invasion of Norway was imminent, the three Draug-class ships were posted to the 2nd Naval District in south- and mid-western Norway. Draug was based at Haugesund, Garm at Bergen and Troll at Måløy. Draug escaped to the United Kingdom on 9 April 1940 after an action against German transports. Garm was sunk by German bombers at the village of Bjordal in the Sognefjord on 26 April 1940. Troll, which had been ordered to Shetland, was abandoned by her crew at Florø was captured at anchor by the advancing German forces on 18 May 1940. Troll was used as a condensor vessel and heating barge in the shipyard at Laksevaag.

Draug served as an escort vessel on the east coast of Britain until she was scrapped in 1944. Troll was returned to Norway by the Germans following the end of the Second World War. The ship was sold in 1947 and broken up for scrap.

== Bibliography ==
- Chesneau, Roger, ed. (1980). Conway's All the World's Fighting Ships 1922–1946. Greenwich, UK: Conway Maritime Press. ISBN 0-85177-146-7.
- Gardiner, Robert & Gray, Randal, eds. (1986). Conway's All the World's Fighting Ships 1906–1921. London: Conway Maritime Press. ISBN 0-85177-245-5.
- Jane's Fighting Ships of World War II. Avenel, New Jersey: Crescent Books. 1995 [1946]. ISBN 0-517-679639.
- Kvam, Kåre Eysteinson (1963). Sjøkrigsmateriellets utvikling etter Krimkrigen (en kortfattet oversikt) (in Norwegian). Oslo: Sjøforsvarets overkommando.
- Whitley, M. J. (2000) [1988]. Destroyers of World War Two: An International Encyclopedia. Annapolis, Maryland: Naval Institute Press. ISBN 0-87021-326-1.
