= MS Seattle =

German cargo ship sunk in 1940

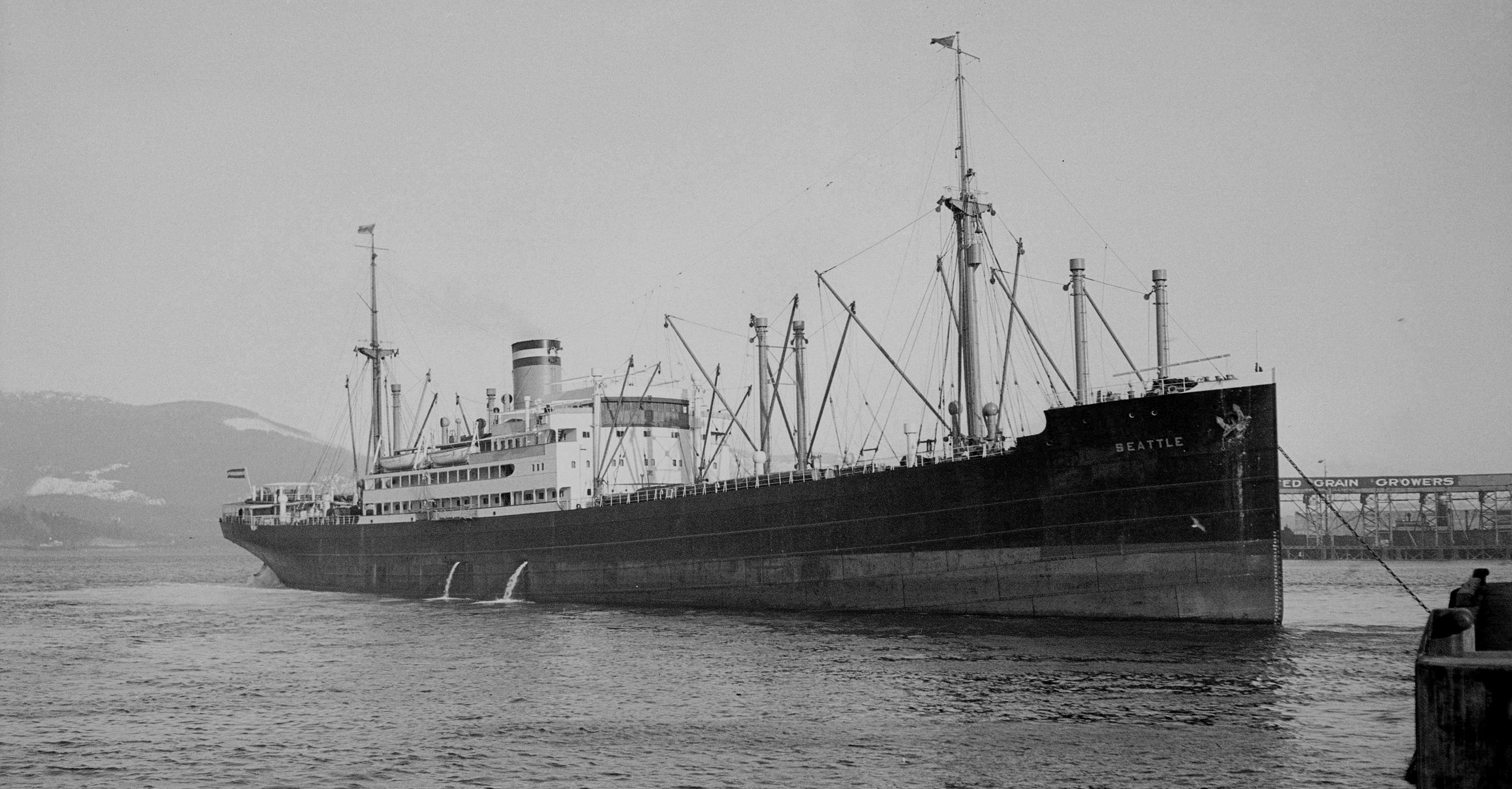
- Seattle at anchor in 1933

History

Germany
- Name: Seattle
- Namesake: Seattle
- Owner: Hamburg America Line
- Port of registry: Hamburg
- Route: Hamburg – Vancouver
- Builder: Deutsche Werft, Hamburg
- Yard number: 104
- Launched: 28 March 1928
- Completed: 7 June 1928
- Identification: 1928: code letters RGTD; 1934: call sign DIFA
- Fate: sunk 1940

General characteristics
- Type: cargo liner
- Tonnage: 7,369 GRT, 4,355 NRT, 9,773 DWT
- Length: 461.6 ft (140.7 m)
- Beam: 61.6 ft (18.8 m)
- Depth: 27.7 ft (8.4 m)
- Decks: 2
- Installed power: 1,845 NHP
- Propulsion: 1 × two-stroke diesel engine; 1 × screw
- Speed: 13 knots (24 km/h)
- Capacity: 88,200 cubic feet (2,498 m^{3}) refrigerated
- Crew: 57
- Sensors & processing systems: submarine signalling; by 1930: wireless direction finding
- Notes: sister ship: Portland

MS Seattle was a Hamburg America Line (HAPAG) cargo liner that was launched in 1928. Her regular route was between Hamburg and Vancouver via the Panama Canal and the West Coast of the United States.

She spent the first six months of the Second World War sheltering in the Netherlands Antilles. She then tried to reach Germany via the Norwegian Sea, but ran into the first day of the German invasion of Norway and was sunk. Her wreck is now a popular but hazardous wreck diving site.

== Building ==
In June 1928 HAPAG took delivery of a pair of new motor ships for its Hamburg – Vancouver route. Deutsche Werft in Hamburg launched Seattle on 28 March 1928 and completed her on 7 June. Bremer Vulkan in Bremen launched her sister ship Portland on 19 April 1928 and completed her on 30 June.

Seattle's registered length was 461.6 ft (140.7 m), her beam was 61.6 ft (18.8 m) and her depth was 27.7 ft (8.4 m). Her tonnages were 7,369 GRT, 4,355 NRT, and 9,773 DWT. 88,200 cubic feet (2,498 m^{3}) of her cargo space was refrigerated.

Seattle had a single screw, driven by an MAN seven-cylinder two-stroke diesel engine. It was rated at 1,845 NHP and gave her a speed of 13 knots (24 km/h).

== Career ==
HAPAG registered Seattle at Hamburg. Her code letters were RGTD. Her navigation equipment included submarine signalling. By 1930 it also included wireless direction finding. By 1934 her wireless telegraph call sign was DIFA, and this had superseded her code letters.

Seattle's regular route was between Hamburg and Vancouver. Regular ports of call on the route were Bremen, Antwerp, Curaçao, Cristóbal, Los Angeles, San Francisco, and Tacoma. HAPAG advertised that a voyage from Vancouver to Hamburg took about 26 days.

== Loss ==
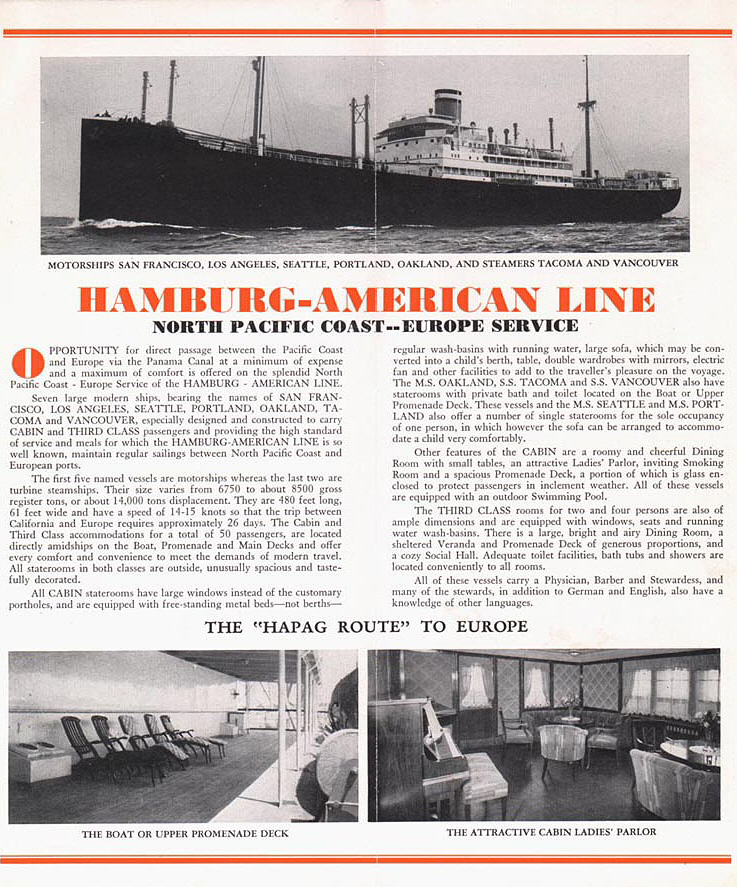
Advertisement for cabin class and third class travel on HAPAG's Vancouver – Hamburg route

In August 1939, shortly before the Invasion of Poland, Germany ordered its merchant ships to either return to a German port or seek refuge in a neutral port as soon as possible. Seattle was returning from Tacoma, San Francisco, and Los Angeles, so on 29 August she put in to Curaçao in the Netherlands Antilles. At first she and a number of other German ships were in port in Willemstad, but then the Dutch authorities made them move 4 nautical miles (8 km) up the coast to St Michael's Bay. Allied warships picketed outside Dutch territorial waters to prevent the German ships' escape.

On 4 March 1940 Seattle and another German motor ship, H. C. Horn's Mimi Horn, left St Michael's Bay undetected. They headed north to try to reach German waters via the Norwegian Sea. On 28 March the armed merchant cruiser HMS Transylvania intercepted Mimi Horn in the Denmark Strait. The German crew scuttled their ship to prevent her being captured as a prize.

Seattle evaded Allied patrols, and on 31 March reached Tromsø in northern Norway. Royal Norwegian Navy destroyers escorted her southward through Norwegian coastal waters. HNoMS Draug took her as far as Stavanger, where HNoMS Gyller took over. On the evening of 8 April Gyller instructed Seattle to anchor off the islet of Oksøy, off Kristiansand in the southernmost part of Norway.

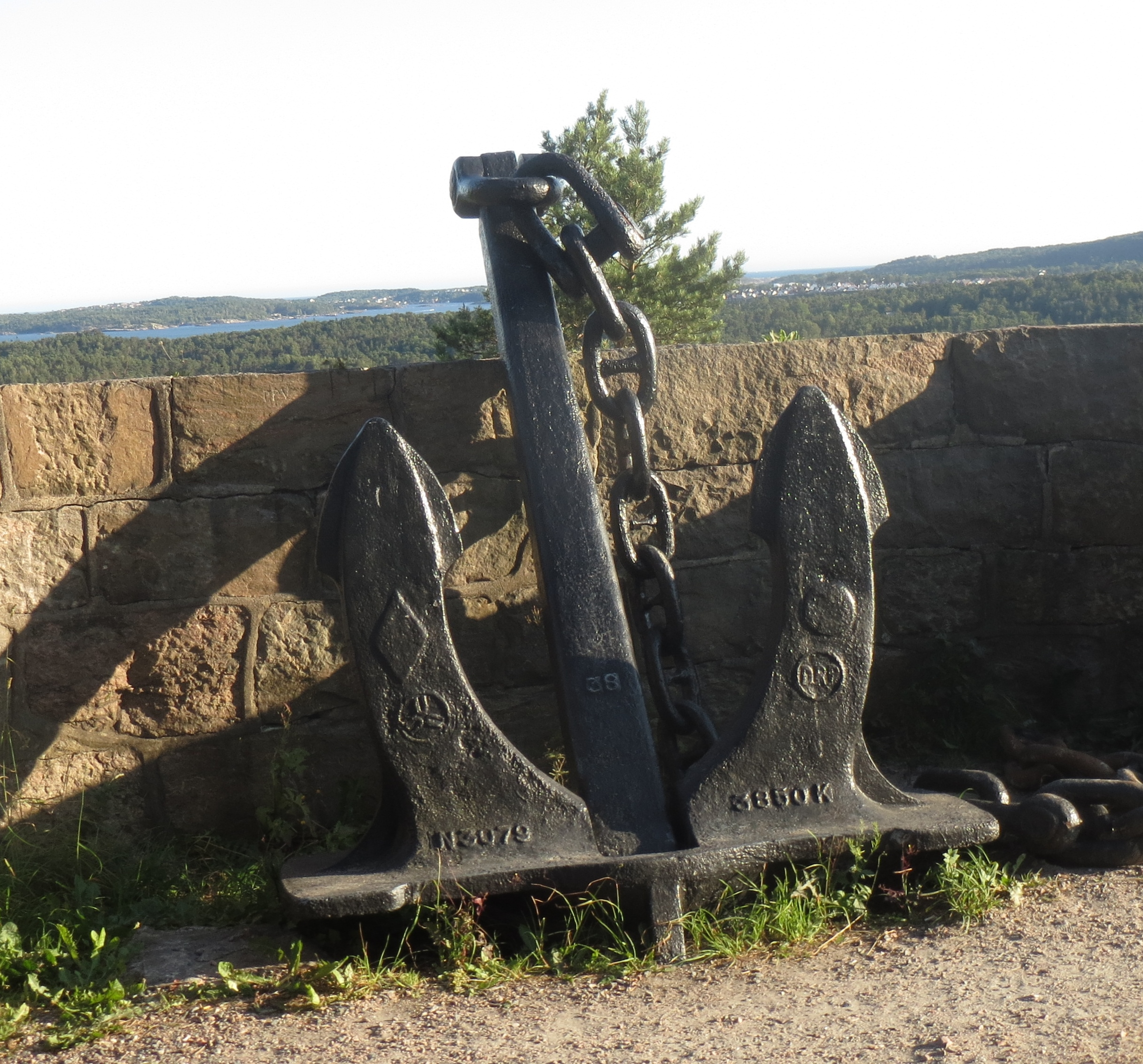
One of Seattle's anchors, preserved on Odderøya

Early the next morning Germany invaded Norway. As Seattle got underway, she sighted warships. Her Master assumed they were Allied, so he turned Seattle back toward Kristiansand. In fact they were Gruppe 4 of the German invasion force, led by the German cruiser Karlsruhe.

The garrison of the Norwegian coastal defence fortress on Odderøya opened fire on Seattle with its 150-millimetre (5.9 in) guns, setting her on fire. Her crew abandoned ship, and the Norwegians took them prisoner. Gruppe 4 captured Kristiansand, and on 10 April freed Seattle's crew. Seattle drifted, still burning, until 13 April, when she sank at position 58°2′19.6″N 8°1′25.4″E .

== The wreck ==
Seattle's wreck lies at a depth of 25 to 72 metres (82 to 236 ft). It was found in 1988, and is listed by the Norwegian Directorate for Cultural Heritage. Large numbers of sea squirts, sponges, and cnidaria such as dead man's fingers have colonised it, along with fish and starfish. It is popular with divers, but it is hazardous, and there have been several fatal accidents. Divers are encouraged to view the wreck from outside, and not to go inside it.

== Bibliography ==
- Haws, Duncan (1980). The Ships of the Hamburg America, Adler and Carr Lines. Merchant Fleets in Profile. Vol. 4. Cambridge: Patrick Stephens Ltd. ISBN 0-85059-397-2.
- Kludas, Arnold (1989). Vernichtung und Wiedergeburt 1914 bis 1930. Die Geschichte der deutschen Passagierschiffahrt (in German). Vol. IV. Hamburg: Ernst Kabel Verlag. ISBN 978-3822500408.
- Lloyd's Register of Shipping. Vol. II.–Steamers and Motorships. London: Lloyd's Register of Shipping. 1928 – via Internet Archive.
- Lloyd's Register of Shipping (PDF). Vol. I.–Steamers and Motorships under 300 tons. Traslwers, tugs, dredgers, &c. Sailing Vessels. Shipowners, &c. London: Lloyd's Register of Shipping. 1930 – via Southampton City Council.
- Lloyd's Register of Shipping (PDF). Vol. II.–Steamers and Motorships of 300 tons gross and over. London: Lloyd's Register of Shipping. 1930 – via Southampton City Council.
- Lloyd's Register of Shipping (PDF). Vol. II.–Steamers and Motorships of 300 tons gross and over. London: Lloyd's Register of Shipping. 1934 – via Southampton City Council.
