= HNoMS Garm (1913) =

Coordinates: 61°04′41″N 5°49′55″E

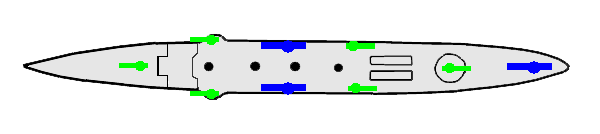
- HNoMS Garm before the war, clearly showing off her four funnels

History

Norway
- Name: Garm
- Namesake: Ragnarök hound Garmr
- Builder: The Royal Norwegian Navy's shipyard at Horten
- Yard number: 107
- Launched: 27 May 1913
- Commissioned: 6 July 1914
- Decommissioned: 26 April 1940
- Fate: Sunk by Luftwaffe bombers 26 April 1940

Service record
- Commanders: Captain Sigurd Skjolden; (? – 26 April 1940)
- Operations: Norwegian Campaign

General characteristics
- Class & type: Draug class
- Displacement: 580 tons standard
- Length: 69.2 m (227.03 ft)
- Beam: 7.3 m (23.95 ft)
- Draft: 2.9 m (9.51 ft)
- Propulsion: Two steam turbines with 8000 hp
- Speed: 27 knots (50.00 km/h)
- Complement: 76 men
- Armament: 6 × 7.6 cm (3-inch) guns; 1 × 12.7 mm Colt anti-aircraft machine gun; 3 × trainable 45 cm torpedo launchers

HNoMS Garm was the third destroyer built for the Royal Norwegian Navy, and was a Draug class destroyer. Garm was constructed several years after her two sister ships, but to the same plans. She was built at the naval shipyard in Horten, with yard number 107.

== Reactivation at the outbreak of the Second World War ==
Garm was mothballed after she became obsolete, but was recommissioned 28 August 1939 and took part in the defence of Norway after the German invasion in 1940. She was deployed to the 2nd Naval District's 1st destroyer division, a district covering an area roughly the same as the Vestlandet and Trøndelag regions.

== Neutrality duties and the Altmark Incident ==
On 15 February 1940 Garm was the third and final Royal Norwegian Navy warship to search the German tanker and POW ship Altmark after she entered Norwegian territorial waters up until the Altmark Incident. Garm transported the commanding admiral of the 2nd Naval District, Admiral Carsten Tank-Nielsen, to the German vessel, then in the Hjeltefjord, so could personally approve the decision to let the ship proceed. After this final cursory inspection Garm let the German ship continue southwards.

== Norwegian Campaign service ==
On 9 April 1940 Garm was stationed at Norway's second largest city, Bergen, and the vessel operated in the Sognefjord after the Germans had occupied Bergen.

=== Defence of Bergen ===
During the German attack on Bergen Garm intercepted the last ship of the enemy flotilla, the cruiser Königsberg, and tried to carry out a torpedo attack. This failed due to the distance between the two ships being to great for a quick surprise attack by the tiny Norwegian destroyer. As Garm's commander, Captain Sigurd Skjolden, attempted to close to torpedo range of the cruiser (the distance between the ships was about 4,000 metres (13,000 ft) and the torpedoes were pre-set for 2,000 metres (6,600 ft) range) Königsberg opened fire and straddled the Norwegian ship with 15 cm shells. After a number of near misses from the German guns Garm broke off her attack and fled to the north, pursued by Luftwaffe bombers.

=== Sinking in the Sognefjord ===
She was sunk by a direct hit from Luftwaffe bombers while anchored near her sister ship Troll at their Sognefjord base of Bjordal on 26 April.

Five German bombers attacked the two destroyers and one of the around thirty bombs dropped hit Garm right behind the front funnel, detonating two of her torpedoes and some other ammunition. The ship was almost broken in half by the explosion and burned for hours before sinking. All members of the crew had abandoned ship when the attack came as she had no effective anti-aircraft weapons to defend herself with, hence no casualties were endured during Garm's sinking.

== Sources ==
- Abelsen, Frank (1986). Norwegian naval ships 1939–1945 (in Norwegian and English). Oslo: Sem & Stenersen AS. ISBN 82-7046-050-8.
