= Carsten Tank Nielsen =

Norwegian civil servant (1818–1892)

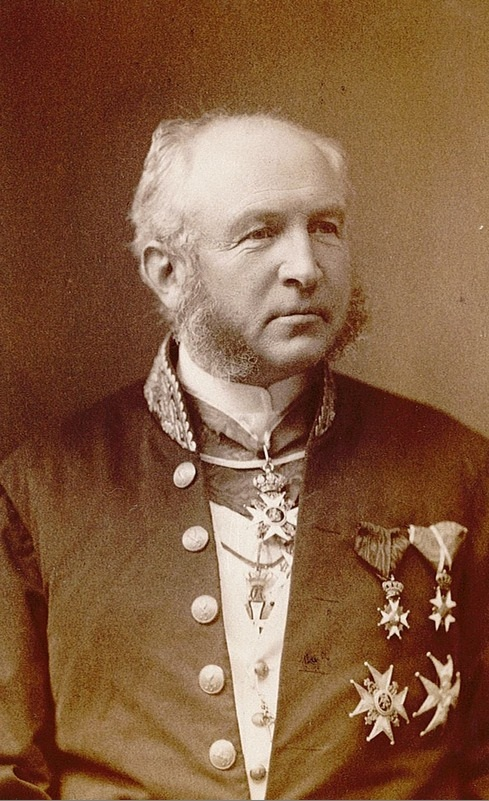
Carsten Tank Nielsen

Carsten Tank Nielsen (18 December 1818 – 1 August 1892) was a Norwegian civil servant and government official. He was the first director of the Norwegian Telegraph (Telegrafverket now Telenor) from 1854 until his death in 1892. He and his wife Alvilde Olsen (1821–1890) were the parents of the historian and politician, Yngvar Nielsen.
