= HNoMS Frithjof =

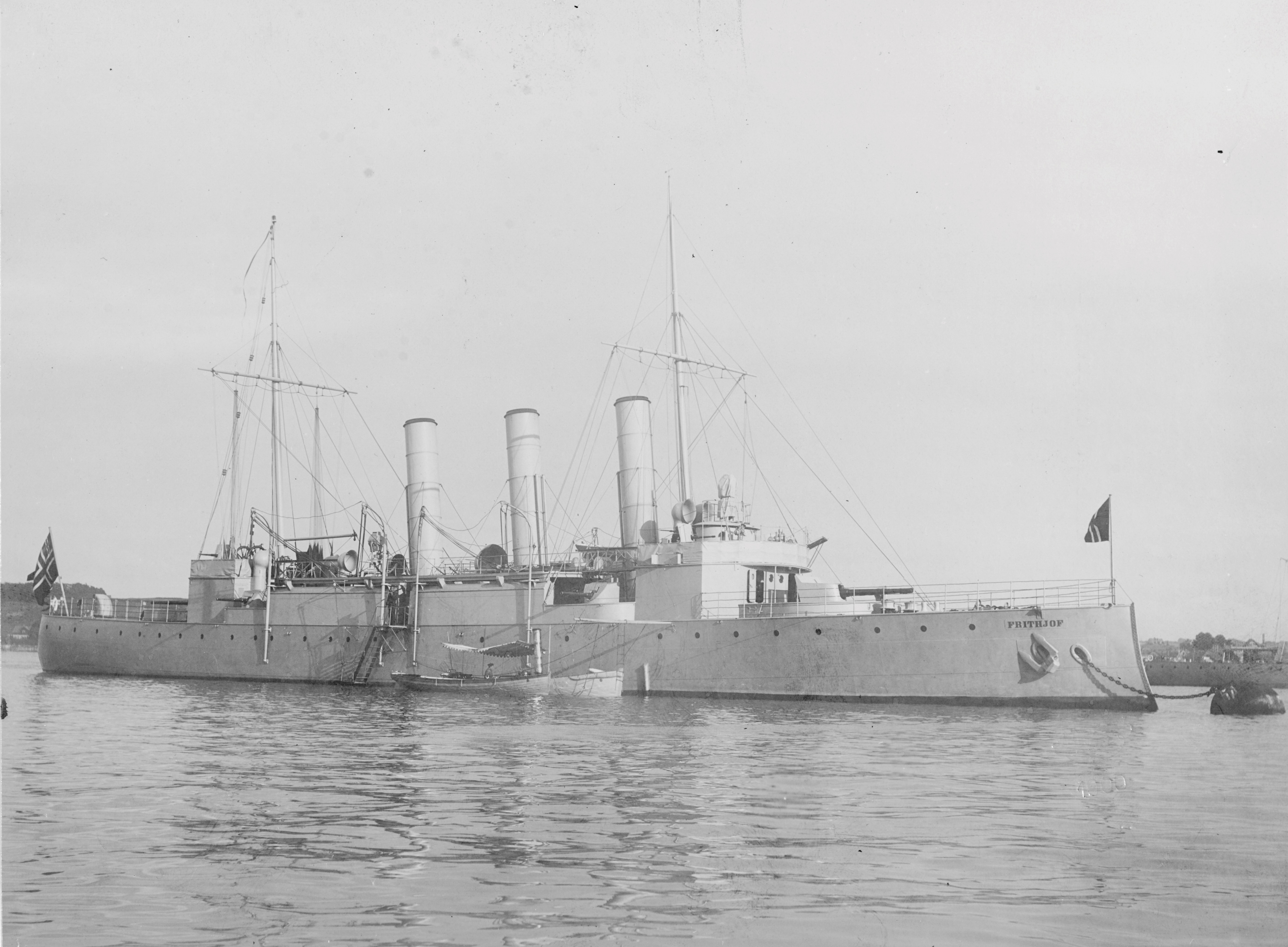
- Frithjof in Kiel, 1900

History

Norway
- Name: Frithjof
- Builder: Navy Yard, Karljohansvern
- Yard number: 76
- Launched: 15 November 1895
- Commissioned: 1895
- Decommissioned: 1928

General characteristics
- Class & type: 1. class gunboat
- Displacement: 1,280 long tons (1,301 t) or 1,360 long tons (1,382 t) (sources disagree)
- Length: 68.17 m (223 ft 8 in)
- Beam: 9.98 m (32 ft 9 in)
- Draught: 4 m (13 ft 1 in)
- Propulsion: Reciprocating steam engine, 2,800 hp (2,088 kW), 2 shafts
- Speed: 15 knots (17 mph; 28 km/h)
- Complement: 154
- Armament: 2 × 12 cm (5 in) guns; 4 × 76 mm (3 in) QF guns; 4 × 1-pounder 37 mm (1 in) automatic gun; 1 × 46 cm (18 in) torpedo tube

HNoMS Frithjof was a 1. class gunboat (built for the Royal Norwegian Navy. Like the other Norwegian gunboats of her era, she carried a heavy armament on a diminutive hull. The vessel was built at the Naval Yard at Horten, and had yard number 76.

Frithjof served with the Norwegian Navy as a gunboat and cadet training ship until stricken in 1928.
