= HNoMS Troll (1910) =

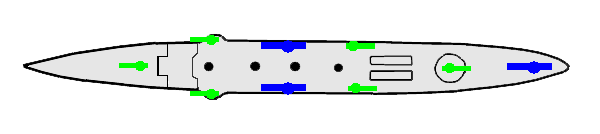
- Troll abandoned at Florø, May 1940

History

Norway
- Name: Troll
- Namesake: The Norse mythological creature Troll
- Builder: The Royal Norwegian Navy's shipyard at Horten
- Yard number: 104
- Launched: 7 July 1910
- Commissioned: 13 March 1912
- Out of service: 4 May 1940
- Captured: by the Germans 18 May 1940

Service record
- Operations: Norwegian Campaign

Nazi Germany
- Name: Troll
- Acquired: 18 May 1940
- Fate: Handed back to Norway after VE Day

Service record
- Operations: Occupation of Norway by Nazi Germany

History

Norway
- Name: Troll
- Acquired: May 1945
- Fate: Scrapped in 1949

General characteristics
- Class & type: Draug-class
- Displacement: 578 tons standard
- Length: 69.2 m (227.03 ft)
- Beam: 7.3 m (23.95 ft)
- Draft: 2.9 m (9.51 ft)
- Propulsion: Triple expansion steam engine with 7500 hp
- Speed: 27 knots (50.00 km/h)
- Complement: 76 men
- Armament: 6 × 7.6 cm (3 inch) guns; 1 × 12.7 mm Colt; anti-aircraft machine gun; 3 × trainable 45 cm torpedo tubes

The destroyer HNoMS Troll, known locally as Torpedojager Troll (litt.: torpedo hunter), was the second destroyer built for the Royal Norwegian Navy, as the second ship of the Draug-class destroyers. She was built at the naval shipyard in Horten, with yard number 104. She was kept in service long after she was obsolete, and took part in the defence of Norway after the German invasion in 1940.

== Norwegian Campaign ==
On 9 April Troll was stationed at Måløy, as part of the 2nd Naval District's 1st destroyer division. Commanded by Captain J. Dahl the vessel operated in the Sognefjord after the German invasion.

As the forces in the Sognefjord naval district started surrendering 1 May Troll was ordered to sail to the UK, but due to a lack of coal the ship was unable to do so. Hence, she struck her flag in Florø on 4 May 1940. Her crew joined the Norwegian land forces. The abandoned ship was found and seized in Florø by the Germans on 18 May.

== German service ==
After capture Troll, retaining its original name, was rebuilt by the Germans as a distillation vessel and steam supply ship, having her whole superstructure removed. She was used as such at the Laksevåg shipyard near Bergen from 1941 until she was returned to the Royal Norwegian Navy in 1945.

== Post-war ==
Although Troll survived the war years and was returned to her proper owners, she was by then too worn down to see further service and was sold for scrapping in 1949.

== Literature ==
- Abelsen, Frank (1986). Norwegian naval ships 1939-1945 (in Norwegian and English). Oslo: Sem & Stenersen AS. ISBN 82-7046-050-8.
