= HNoMS Valkyrjen =

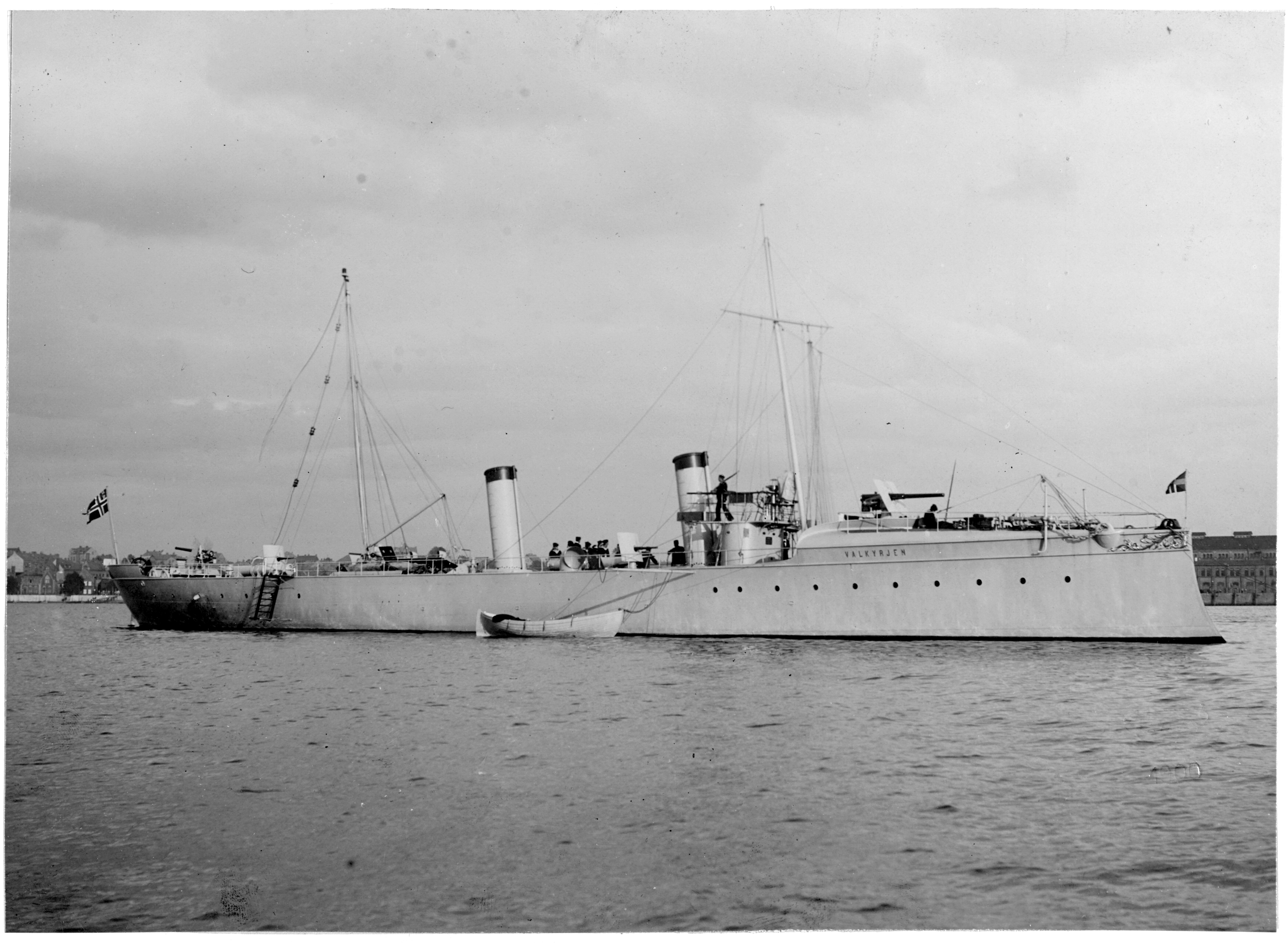
- Valkyrjen in Kiel in 1900

History

Norway
- Name: Valkyrjen
- Builder: F. Schichau, Elbing, Germany
- Launched: 1896
- Commissioned: May 1896
- Decommissioned: September 1920
- Fate: Sold for scrap, 1923

General characteristics
- Displacement: 415 long tons (422 t)
- Length: 59.4 m (194 ft 11 in)
- Beam: 7.4 m (24 ft 3 in)
- Draught: 2.6 m (8 ft 6 in)
- Propulsion: Steam engines, 3,250 ihp (2,424 kW), 2 shafts
- Speed: 23.2 knots (43.0 km/h; 26.7 mph)
- Complement: 59
- Armament: 2 × 76 mm (3.0 in) guns; 4 × 37 mm (1.5 in) guns; 2 × torpedo tubes

HNoMS Valkyrjen was a torpedo boat destroyer of the Royal Norwegian Navy, built at F. Schichau shipyard in Elbing, Germany. The funds for the ship had been raised by the women of Norway and the ship was named Valkyrien in their honour. She was also nicknamed Damernes krigsskib ("The Ladies Warship"). The ship had its first sea trial on 11 May 1896 and was swiftly approved. She was completed in Horten, Norway, and delivered to the minister of defence in Christiania (Oslo), on 17 May 1896. The ship was opened to the public for two days before sailing back to Horten.

Valkyrjen had a displacement of 415 tons. Her dimensions were 59.4 × 7.4 × 2.6 metres and she had a top speed of 23.2 knots (43.0 km/h). She had a crew complement of 59. Her armament included two 76 mm and four 37 mm guns in addition to two torpedo launchers.

In August 1920 the Valkyrien carried out exercises on the west coast with the Tordenskjold and Harald Haarfagre, and after returning to Bergen, she was decommissioned on 27 September 1920. In 1922 Valkyrien was stripped of all reusable materials, and then sold for scrap in 1923.
