= Carsten Tank-Nielsen =

Norwegian naval officer, submarine pioneer and rear admiral

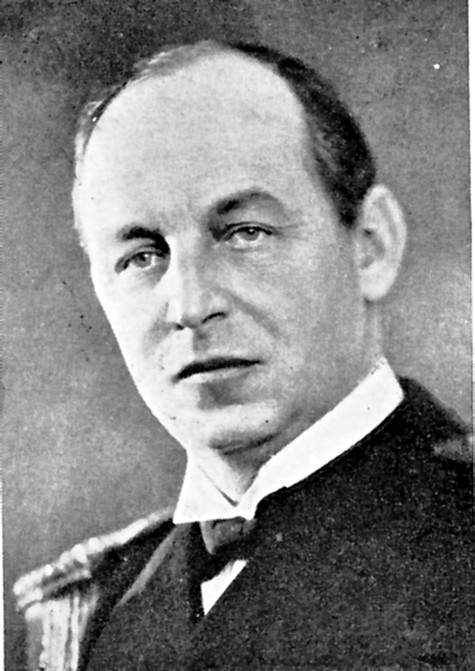
- Carsten Tank-Nielsen (pre-1934)
- Born: 16 September 1877; Horten, Norway
- Died: 2 August 1957 (aged 79)
- Relatives: Carsten Tank Nielsen (grandfather)
- Military career
- Allegiance: Norway
- Service / branch: Navy
- Rank: Commander
- Commands: Kobben
- Battles / wars: Operation Weserübung

Carsten Tank-Nielsen (16 September 1877 – 2 August 1957) was a Norwegian naval officer, submarine pioneer and rear admiral. He was born in Horten, and was the grandson of Carsten Tank Nielsen. He was chief of the Norwegian Navy's first submarine Kobben from 1909 to 1913. He was decorated Knight, First Class of the Order of St. Olav in 1926. He was appointed rear admiral in 1938, and faced the German invasion of Norway as a commander in Bergen.
