= Håkon Nilsen =

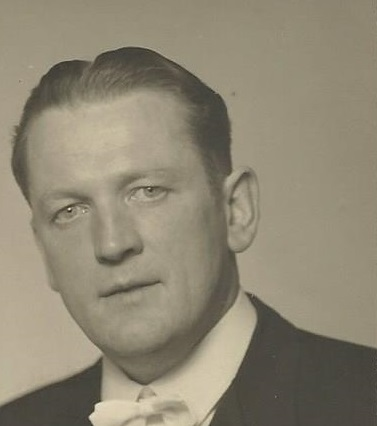
- Born: April 16, 1913
- Died: January 30, 1976 (aged 62)

Håkon Nilsen (16 April 1913 – 30 January 1976), Stavanger, Norway, popularly known as "Torpedo Nilsen", was a Norwegian war veteran and highly decorated allied naval torpedo commander of World War II.

== Draug ==
He dramatically escaped Norway in April 1940 as crew member on the Norwegian destroyer HNoMS Draug. During the night of 9 April, Draug was patrolling and watching shipping in the Karmsund. At about 0200hrs, the ship's captain Thore Horve was notified that Oslofjord Fortress was engaging an unknown enemy force in the Oslofjord, leading to the crew being ordered to full combat stations. At 0400hrs, an unknown ship, flying no national flag, was observed sailing northwards through the Karmsund. The ship refused to stop after both flares and warning shots had been fired and Draug had to give chase and capture the vessel. After leading the unknown ship into Haugesund, its identity was found to be the 7,624 ton German vessel Main, with papers claiming she was carrying a cargo of 7,000 tons of coke to Bergen. When Draug 's second-in-command, Lieutenant Østervold, tried to inspect the cargo, however, he was refused by the German captain, all entrances to the cargo hold also being blocked off to make a proper search impossible. In response, the inspecting officer decided to take the ship under arrest and sealed the radio room. The cargo hidden on board Main later turned out to have consisted of provisions and matériel for the invading German forces at Trondheim, chiefly some 2,000 naval mines.

Lt. Cdr. Thore Horve (later vice admiral) decided to take the enemy ship as a prize and bring it to a British port. Since Draug had almost no anti-aircraft weapons to speak of, and the skies were full of enemy aircraft, the destroyer could do little good by remaining where she was. He ignored an order from Naval Command to go to the Hardangerfjord and block German naval forces from gaining access to that fjord. As Horve knew that the Naval Command headquarters in Bergen had been captured by the German invaders, he assumed that the order was false, although it later turned out it was not. When ordered to steer his ship towards Britain, the captain of Main refused, only yielding after the Norwegian warship fired several warning shots and threatened to torpedo him.

== To the United Kingdom ==
After the two ships had left Haugesund at about 0900hrs on 9 April, they soon came under attack from a Luftwaffe bomber around 40 nautical miles (74 km) off the Norwegian coast. The bombs, aimed at the Main, missed but the German captain immediately scuttled his vessel and ordered his crew to abandon ship. As the order came very suddenly the evacuation was carried out with some panic, the boatswain drowning in the process. After the German sailors had boarded and lowered their life boat Draug fired eight to ten rounds into the waterline of the scuttled merchantman to ensure that she would sink.

Now carrying sixty-seven German sailors along as PoWs in addition to her own crew of seventy-two, Draug sped away towards Sullom Voe in the Shetland Islands. The prisoners were kept on the open deck during the crossing. By the next morning she was met by three of the Royal Navy's Tribal-class destroyers. Two of the British ships, HMS Sikh and HMS Matabele, followed Draug into Sullom Voe, arriving at 1700hrs local time on 10 April, where the German PoWs were handed over to British authorities. Thereafter Draug sailed to Scapa Flow, escorted by the French destroyer Boulonnais, arriving at 1000hrs on 11 April The German prisoners from Main departed Sullom Voe for Kirkwall at 2000hrs on 10 April on the French destroyer Brestois before the French ship proceeded to Scapa Flow.

After arriving in the United Kingdom, many members of Draug 's crew were transferred to Royal Navy ships and would serve aboard them during the remainder of the Norwegian Campaign.

== Battle of the North Cape ==
From 13 March 1942 and until 2 September 1943, Håkon Nilsen served on B-class submarine B-1. From 3 September 1943 he was ordered by Skule Storheill, commanding officer to serve as torpedo commander on HNoMS Stord at the Battle of the North Cape. In the Battle of the North Cape in which the German battleship Scharnhorst was sunk on 26 December 1943. Stord went as close as 400 yards (360 m) of Scharnhorst before firing eight torpedoes.

After the battle, Admiral Fraser sent the following message to the Admiralty: "... Please convey to the C-in-C Norwegian Navy. Stord played a very daring role in the fight and I am very proud of her...".

In an interview in The Evening News on 5 January 1944 the commanding officer of HMS Duke of York said: "... the Norwegian destroyer Stord carried out the most daring attack of the whole action..."

While on Stord, he was present at the Normandy landings in June 1944, and there is a small model of the ship in the D-Day Museum at Arromanches, Normandy, France. He continued to serve on Arctic Escort until 8 December 1945.

After the war Håkon Nilsen became a professional fire-fighter at the Stavanger Fire Brigade, until his retirement in 1974.

On 28 September 2014 he was the first Norwegian war veteran who in recognition of heroic service was posthumously awarded the Arctic Star Medal by the United Kingdom. Winston Churchill, Prime Minister of the United Kingdom reportedly called the route the "worst journey in the world". The Arctic Star was formally approved by Queen Elizabeth II, and was first awarded in early 2013.

== Honours and awards ==
The War Medal with 3 stars is a Norwegian war decoration for service during Second World War, The Defence Medal 1940–1945 is the award rewarded to those military and civilian personnel who participated in the fight against the German invasion and occupation of Norway between 1940 and 1945.

Haakon VII 70th Anniversary Medal.

Awarded by the United Kingdom and the Commonwealth:

1939 – 1945 Star, Atlantic Star with France and Germany Clasp, Defence Medal (United Kingdom), War Medal 1939–1945, Arctic Star

== Bibliography ==
- The Death of The Scharnhorst by John Winton
- Bjørnsson, Nils (1994). Å være eller ikke være – Under orlogsflagget i den annen verdenskrig (in Norwegian). Haakonsvern: Sjømilitære Samfund ved Forlaget Norsk Tidsskrift for Sjøvesen. ISBN 82-990969-3-6.
- Oddvar Schjølberg: Krigsseilernes barn (2015) ISBN 9788283300482
