= Sigurd Valvatne =

Norwegian naval officer (1913–2004)

- Born: 1 May 1913; Kvinnherad Municipality, Norway
- Died: 17 December 2004 (aged 91)
- Occupation: Naval officer
- Awards: War Cross with Sword; St. Olav's Medal with Oak Branch; War Medal; Defence Medal 1940–1945; Haakon VII 70th Anniversary Medal; Distinguished Service Order; Distinguished Service Cross; Atlantic Star; 1939–1945 Star; Order of the Dannebrog

Sigurd Valvatne DSO DSC (1 May 1913 – 17 December 2004) was a Norwegian naval officer.

He was born in Kvinnherad Municipality to Arnfinn Valvatne and Kaia Sundnes. He graduated as naval officer in 1937, and further graduated from submarine training in 1939. During the Second World War he served as submarine commander. His war decorations include the Norwegian War Cross with Sword, the St. Olav's Medal with Oak Branch, the Norwegian War Medal, the Defence Medal 1940–1945, and the Haakon VII 70th Anniversary Medal, the British Distinguished Service Order, the Distinguished Service Cross, the Atlantic Star and the 1939–1945 Star. He continued a military career after the Second World War. From 1963 to 1969 he served as head of the Admiral Staff. He was decorated Knight of the Danish Order of the Dannebrog.

== Selected works ==
In 1954 he wrote the book Med norske ubåter i kamp.
