= Gunnar Halle (officer) =

Norwegian engineer and military officer

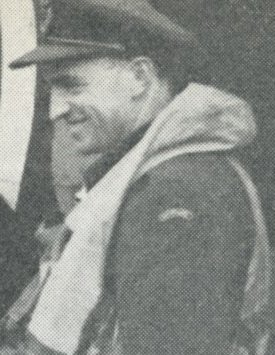
- Born: 19 November 1907; Nesodden, Norway
- Died: 29 October 1986 (aged 78)
- Occupations: engineer and military officer
- Awards: Norwegian: War Cross with Sword; St. Olav's Medal with Oak Branch; War Medal; Defence Medal 1940–1945; Haakon VII 70th Anniversary Medal; British: Distinguished Flying Cross with bar 1939–45 Star; France and Germany Star

Gunnar Halle DFC (19 November 1907 – 29 October 1986) was a Norwegian engineer and military officer.

He was born in Nesodden to lieutenant colonel Einar Halle and Bertha Susanne Koren, and was married to Agnes Reiersen.

During the Second World War he served with the Norwegian Air Forces, in Norway, Canada and England. His war decorations include the War Cross with Sword, the St. Olav's Medal With Oak Branch, War Medal, Defence Medal 1940–1945, Haakon VII 70th Anniversary Medal, the British Distinguished Flying Cross with bar, 1939–45 Star, and France and Germany Star.

He continued his military career after World War II, and held various positions in the aviation industry and with the Royal Norwegian Air Force.

He died in 1986.
