= Dagfinn Kjeholt =

Norwegian naval officer (1912–2005)

Dagfinn Ellif Kjeholt
- Born: 24 February 1912; Horten, Norway
- Occupation: Naval officer
- Awards: St. Olav's Medal with Oak Branch; War Medal; Defence Medal 1940–1945; Haakon VII 70th Anniversary Medal; Legion of Honour; Legion of Merit; Atlantic Star; 1939–1945 Star

Dagfinn Ellif Kjeholt (24 February 1912 – 17 September 2005) was a Norwegian naval officer.

He was born in Horten to Andreas Marentius Kristiansen and Marie Larsen. He graduated as naval officer in 1936. During the Second World War he served as second-in-command on the destroyer HNoMS Sleipner from 1939 to 1942, and was in command of the destroyer Glaisdale from 1943 to 1944. His war decorations include the St. Olav's Medal with two Oak Branches, the Norwegian War Medal, the Defence Medal 1940–1945, and the Haakon VII 70th Anniversary Medal, the British 1939–1945 Star and the Atlantic Star, the French Legion of Honour, and he was Officer of the American Legion of Merit. He continued a military career after the Second World War, and was promoted rear admiral in 1958.
