= Boy Rist =

- Born: 1 January 1912; Gravdal, Norway
- Died: 16 November 1972 (aged 60); Lanzarote, Spain
- Military career
- Allegiance: Norway
- Service years: 1939-1972
- Rank: kommandørkaptein (commander)
- Units: Norwegian resistance movement Norwegian Independent Company 1 SOE
- Conflicts: World War II
- Awards: (Norway) War Cross with sword (Norway) Norwegian War Medal (Norway) in silver (Norway) Defence Medal with Rosette (Norway) Haakon VII 70th Anniversary Medal (United Kingdom) 1939-1945 Star (United Kingdom) Atlantic Star with clasp (United Kingdom) Defence Medal
- Other work: Mayor, General Manager Ship Yard

Boy Roald Rist (1 January 1912 – 16 November 1972) was a member of the Norwegian resistance movement during the German occupation of Norway in World War II. He was a naval officer, and a member Norwegian Independent Company 1 a part of Special Operations Executive (SOE). He was awarded the War Cross with sword, Norway's highest award.

== Background ==
Rist hailed from Gravdal in Hol Municipality (now Vestvågøy Municipality) in the Lofoten Islands. After primary school, he completed (in 1929) the seaman's course on Statsraad Lehmkuhl and started serving on vessels in international trade. In 1935 he took the exams for the coastal skipper certificate, and from 1936 to 1939 he worked as a fishmonger and a farmer.

From October 1939, Rist served on Heimdal, which had been mobilised to safeguard Norwegian neutrality.

== Second World War ==
When the Germans attacked Norway on 9 April 1940, Rist was still in service on Heimdal. He took part in the fighting in northern Norway. Left Tromsø 6 June, escape to England via Shetland - Scotland, Rosyth Naval Station, Edinburgh before he came over to the UK. During World War II served Rist in the Navy, where he sailed in convoy and served on Corvette and Motor Torpedo Boat (MTB). In June 1940, Rist underwent a Gunner course in Helenslee. Then he was a gunner on the merchant ship SS Marita, which went in convoy traffic between Canada and the United Kingdom. 3 trips UK - Canada - UK, convoy escort each end out to 300nmil of the coast, then unprotected except his own gun. The convoys had 50% loss on these trips. In December 1940, Rist went with SS Marita to Freetown in Sierra Leone. Attacked by German raider off the Canary Islands. Mutiny on board, and the steam engine lost power. Got the help of British Merchant raider. "Clear ship" was declared mutiny hit down. Went alone round trip to England. On the return trip to England he became ill with malaria and was hospitalized in London. This was during the time London was very heavily bombed in the battle of Britain. After he recovered, he was ordered to serve on the corvette Eglantine, which was transferred to the Royal Norwegian Navy and was outfitted in Belfast before the ship was put into escort service in the Atlantic convoys.

In 1942, Rist also took courses and received training as a commando. In May 1943, he moved to MTB Flotilla in Shetland. Rist was on four trips to occupied Norway, before he later in 1943 was back again in service on Eglantine. From February 1944, Rist was in preparation for Operation Overlord, and in June 1944 he participated in the Normandy landings.

Under the alias "Otto Borgen" Rist was in December 1944 appointed Secretary at the Norwegian legation in Stockholm. From Sweden Rist participated in the Polar Bear expeditions, a series of operations aimed to secure Norwegian ports during an invasion or German withdrawal. Early in 1945 Rist served as Head of Polar Bear 1, where the goal was to protect the port of Narvik. The Unit operated from a Sepalis base in Sweden.

During a mission across the border to Norway Rist and other participants were discovered by a German patrol on 13 April 1945 and engaged in a fire-fight. The fight went in Norwegians favour and three Germans were killed. After the fire-fight Rist and his companion made their way back across the border to Sweden. On the basis of this effort Rist was on 20 September 1946 awarded the War Cross "for outstanding efforts during the execution of special mission."

== Postwar ==
Rist was working for the establishment of naval force of the Home Guard (Norway). In 1951 Rist led the nation's first Naval Home Guard courses in Reine, Lofoten. He was since then often called the Naval Home Guard father. He was head of the Naval Coast Guard in northern Norway. In March August 1966 he was promoted to Lieutenant Commander for special service in the Navy and in March the following year came the appointment to lieutenant commander. On 19 December 1969 was Rist promoted to Commander.

== Honours and awards ==
In addition to the *War Cross with sword (in Norwegian) – received Rist several other Norwegian and British awards. Rist was awarded the Norwegian War Medal, the Medal for Heroic Deeds in silver, the Defence Medal 1940–1945 with Rosette, and the Haakon VII 70th Anniversary Medal from Norway as well as the 1939-1945 Star, the Atlantic Star with clasp, and the Defence Medal from Britain. He was also "Mentioned in Dispatches for bravery" by Dwight Eisenhower in conjunction with effort on D-Day and the liberation of Europe.
