= Ernst Ullring =

Norwegian naval officer and inventor

- Born: Ernst Gustav Adolf Ullring; 18 June 1894; Horten, Norway
- Died: 10 October 1953 (aged 59)
- Occupation: Naval officer
- Awards: War Cross with Sword; War Medal; Defence Medal 1940–1945; Haakon VII 70th Anniversary Medal; Distinguished Service Order

Ernst Ullring DSO (18 June 1894 – 10 October 1953) was a Norwegian naval officer and inventor who is known for his contributions during the Second World War.

Ullring was born in Horten to Ole Edvard Ullring and Svenda Fogelstrøm, and graduated as naval officer in 1916. He invented a series of naval instruments, including the direction finder called Ullrings peileskive. During the Norwegian Campaign in 1940 he was in command of the destroyer HNoMS Sleipner, and he served as military governor of Svalbard 1942–1943. In 1944 and 1945 he served as commodore at the Royal Naval Reserve, and was involved in the Battle of the Atlantic, including the Arctic convoys. His war decorations include the Norwegian War Cross with Sword, the Defence Medal 1940–1945, the Norwegian War Medal, the Haakon VII 70th Anniversary Medal, and the British Distinguished Service Order.
