= Hakon Lunde =

Norwegian politician

Hakon Lunde (12 October 1918 – 2 October 2005) was a Norwegian politician for the Progress Party.

He was born in Kristiania as a son of wholesaler Ragnvald Bredo Lunde (1889–1964) and housewife Bergljot Iversen (1892–1987). He attended his first years of school in Nordstrand and Oslo Commerce School from 1935 to 1937. During World War II he was a soldier, first in the Norwegian Campaign. After irregular resistance work, he fled to Sweden, where he worked in the Norwegian legation in Stockholm. He then continued to the United Kingdom, where he received further education in the Royal Norwegian Navy-in-exile and the Royal Navy. Among others, he participated in the D-Day invasion, surviving the sinking of his ship, the destroyer HNoMS Svenner. He became heavily decorated with the UK Defence Medal, the Norwegian Defence Medal with Star, the Atlantic Star, the Norwegian War Medal with Star as well as two French and one Soviet medal. He chaired the Marinens Reserveoffiserers Forbund from 1948 to 1957, and received four veterancy awards between 1976 and 1991. From 1994 he chaired the Royal Norwegian Navy veterans' association. He contributed to erecting D-Day monuments at Vippetangen in 1992 and Hermanville-sur-Mer in 2004.

From 1958 to 1998 he was the chairman of the company Hakon Lunde A/S. He was also chairman of Westermoen Båtbyggeri & Mek. Verksted from 1950 to 1958 and Christian Radich from 1978 to 1983 (board member 1964 to 1978). He was a board member of Elkjøp from 1963 to 1983, Norges Handels- og Sjøfartstidende from 1970 to 1978, Det Norske Oljeselskap from 1971 to 1989, a member of the supervisory board of Norges Bank from 1990 to 1993 and of the corporate assembly of Oslo Sporveier from 1996 to 2000. He was a member of the "council" of the Norwegian Maritime Museum from 1953 to 1996, chairing it from 1988 to 1996. He was a deputy member of the board of Oslo Port Authority from 1996 to 2000, and of the corporate assembly of Nationaltheatret from 1998 to 2000.

He served as a deputy representative to the Parliament of Norway from Oslo during the terms 1989–1993 and 1997–2001. In total he met during 108 days of parliamentary session. From 1995 to 1999 he was a deputy member of Oslo city council.
