= Helge Mehre =

Norwegian military officer (1911–1997)

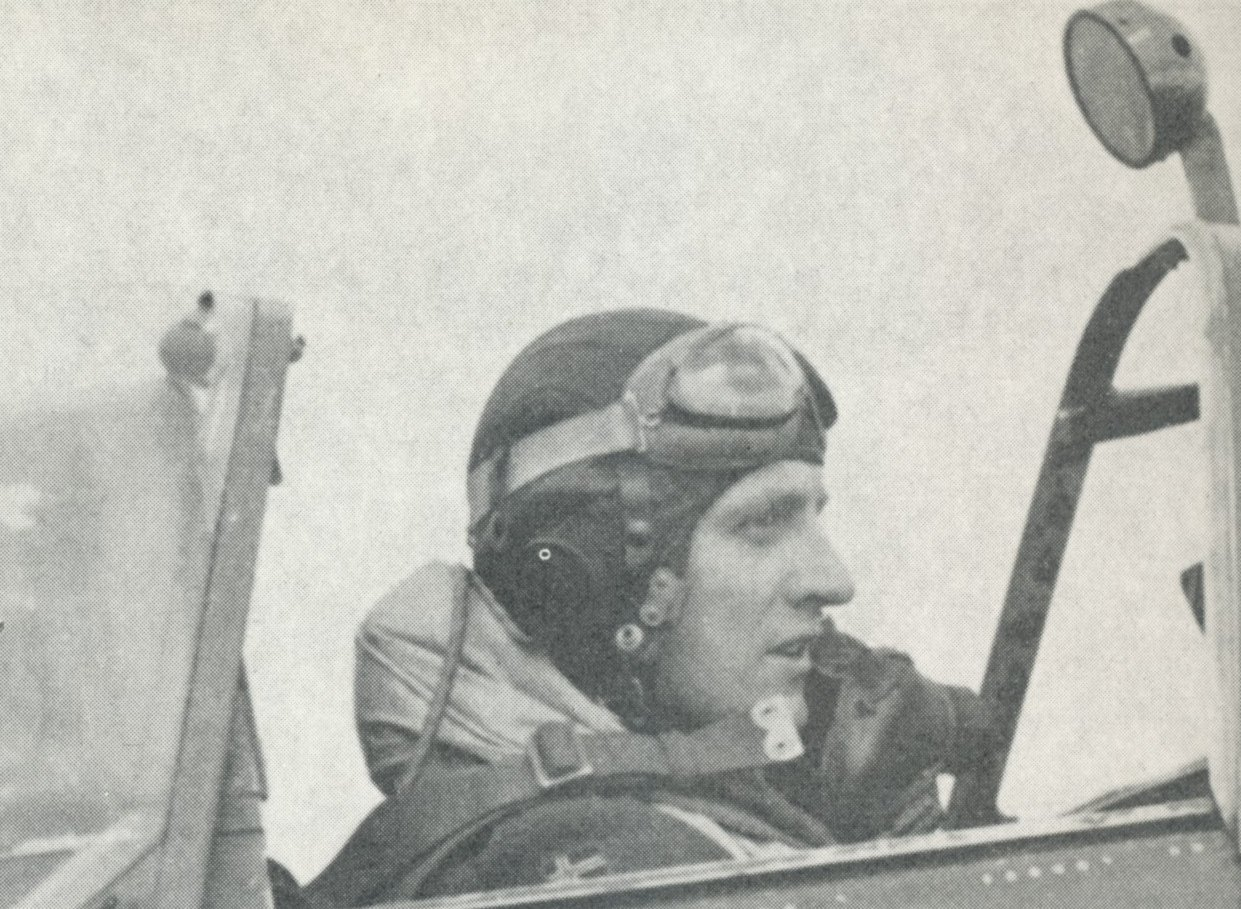
Helge Mehre

Helge Mehre MBE DSO DFC (1 February 1911 – 17 September 1997) was a Norwegian military officer.

== Personal life ==
Mehre was born in Narvik as son of veterinarian Karl Georg Mehre and Helga Olrik. He married Eva Østgaard in 1952. They resided at Strand. He died in September 1997 in Oslo.

== Career ==
During World War II Mehre was in command of the No. 332 Squadron RAF in 1942, and served with the No. 132 Wing RAF from 1943 to 1945. His war decorations included the War Cross with Sword, the Defence Medal 1940–1945, the War Medal, the Haakon VII 70th Anniversary Medal, the British Distinguished Service Order and Distinguished Flying Cross, and the American Distinguished Flying Cross. He was promoted to major general in 1959.

From 1963 he was head of the Air Command Sør-Norge. He was head of the Norwegian Joint Staff College from 1971 to 1972. From 1973 to 1976 he was commander of Akershus Fortress. His memoir book Spitfire. En beretning om den 132. norske jagerwing i den 2. verdenskrig. was published in 1982.

He was also decorated with the Order of the British Empire, as a Commander of the Order of the Sword and the Order of Orange-Nassau.

== Selected works ==
- Spitfire. En beretning om den 132. norske jagerwing i den 2. verdenskrig. 1982.
- Flyvåpnene i den 2. verdenskrig. Jagerflyene. 1985.
