= Nils Uhlin Hansen =

Norwegian long jumper and resistance member

- Born: 6 May 1919; Trondhjem
- Died: 11 January 1945 (aged 25); Forsetvollan, Budal Municipality
- Military career
- Allegiance: Norway
- Branch: Norwegian Army
- Unit: Norwegian Independent Company 1 (Kompani Linge)
- Conflicts: Sabotage missions
- Awards: (Norway) Defence Medal 1940–1945 (Norway) Norwegian War Medal with Star

Nils Uhlin Hansen (6 May 1919 – 11 January 1945) was a Norwegian long jumper and resistance member during World War II. He had a successful athletics career before the war; setting a Nordic long jump record which was not surpassed for 20 years (14 years after his death). He was killed less than four months before the end of the war, as he was surprised by Wehrmacht forces following a sabotage mission.

== Pre-war life ==
He was born in Trondheim, the son of Haakon Hansen and Swedish citizen Agnes Collin. Representing sports club SK Freidig, he had a successful career in the long jump; only nineteen years old he won the Norwegian championships. Jumping 7.39 metres, he was 25 centimetres ahead of runner-up Kaare Strøm. In 1939, Hansen won a silver medal behind Kaare Strøm. On 11 September 1939, Hansen established a new Norwegian record. Jumping 7.54 metres at Bislett stadion, he broke the two-year-old record of Otto Berg with two centimetres. This was also a Nordic record.

His sporting career was cut short by World War II. As Norway was invaded by Germany in 1940, regular sports events and championships were discontinued. The 1940 Summer Olympics in Tokyo, Japan were also cancelled.

== Resistance work ==
Hansen joined the Norwegian resistance movement in 1940. He had to flee the country, arriving in Sweden on 8 November 1941. He then escaped to England in 1942, where he became enrolled in the Norwegian Independent Company 1 (Norwegian: Kompani Linge), a part of the British Special Operations Executive. He conducted several sabotage missions in Norway, including one against the rail road Røros Line in January 1945. Saboteurs were active in Central Norway in late 1944 and early 1945, with sabotages against the Nordland Line, the Dovre Line and the Rauma Line in addition to the Røros Line. This was of high strategic importance, as German forces were retreating from Northern Norway, using the rail roads for troop transport. Although the war was going against Germany at the time, there were rumours that they would not leave Norway without an Allied invasion, thus, pockets of Norwegian resistance forces were prepared for warfare.

On 10 January 1945, German forces reacted, and began searching for militants under the codename Aktion Hengst. They had only vague knowledge on the whereabouts of Norwegian militants, but on 11 January they found a lone skier in Singsås Municipality. They questioned him, and then released him, only to follow his tracks. The tracks led the German task force to a cabin at Forsetvollan in Budal Municipality. Nils Uhlin Hansen was staying in the cabin at the time, and when shooting ensued, Hansen was killed. Two days after his death Norwegian saboteurs carried out Operation Woodlark, killing 70–80 troops by destroying the bridge over the Jørstadelva, west of Jørstad.

== Awards and legacy ==
Uhlin Hansen was awarded the Norwegian War Medal, the Defence Medal 1940–1945 and then the Norwegian War Medal with Star. A road in Trondheim has been named for him.

His national long jump record stood until 1959, when it was broken by Roar Berthelsen with eleven centimetres.
