= Skule Storheill =

Norwegian naval officer

Skule Valentin Storheill
- Born: 17 August 1907; Brønnøysund, Norway
- Died: 25 November 1992 (aged 85); Drøbak, Norway
- Military career
- Allegiance: United Kingdom; Norway
- Branch: Royal Navy; Royal Norwegian Navy
- Service years: 1928–1969
- Rank: Vice Admiral
- Awards: War Cross with Sword; Commander with Star of the Order of St. Olav; St. Olav's Medal With Oak Branch; Distinguished Service Cross and 2 bars (UK); Commander of the Order of the Dannebrog (Denmark); Officer of the Legion of Merit (United States); Commander of the Legion of Honour (France); Croix de guerre 1939–1945 (France); Grand Cross of the Order of the House of Orange (Netherlands)

Skule Valentin Storheill (17 August 1907 – 25 November 1992) was a Norwegian naval officer who reached prominence in World War II while serving aboard Norwegian warships within the Royal Navy, and received Norway's highest military decoration, the War Cross with Sword.

== Early life ==
Storheill was born and grew up in Brønnøysund. He joined the Norwegian Merchant Navy but then joined the Naval Academy in Horten. He became a naval officer in 1928, and was promoted to Lieutenant in 1931 and by 1936 was an Inspection Officer at the Naval Academy.

== Military career ==
=== World War II ===
In June 1940 he was the Norwegian liaison officer on board the heavy cruiser HMS Devonshire, flying the Flag of Vice Admiral John Cunningham, which evacuated Norway's King Haakon VII and Government ministers from Tromsø to Great Britain to continue the struggle against the German occupation of their country.

Then, as a Lieutenant-Commander, Storheill was in command of the Norwegian lend-lease destroyer HNoMS St Albans from July 1941. Along with other British warships, St Albans sank a German U-boat in the Atlantic Ocean on 3 August 1941. For this he received the War Cross.

He became Commander in 1942 and took command of the newly built destroyer HMS Eskdale. He participated in Operation Torch (the Allied landing in North Africa) in the autumn of 1942. Eskdale was sunk in battle with German E-boat in the English Channel in 1943.

Voluntarily reducing his rank again to Lieutenant-Commander, he took command of the destroyer HNoMS Stord from August 1943 until the end of June 1944. In the Home Fleet, Stord escorted convoys to the Soviet Union through the Norwegian Sea and Barents Sea, and took part in the Battle of North Cape in which the German battleship Scharnhorst was sunk on December 26, 1943. He took his ship within 400 yards (360 m) of Scharnhorst before firing torpedoes. In Stord he was also present at the Normandy landings in June 1944, and there is a small model of the ship in the D-Day Museum at Arromanches, Normandy, France.

Towards the end of the war, Storheill escorted Allied convoys in the Atlantic and the Arctic Ocean, and in May 1945 led Norwegian authorities back to Tromsø following the German surrender.

Also as a result of his war service he was created a Commander with Star of the Order of St. Olav followed by awards of the St. Olav's Medal with Oak Branch, the War Medal, the Grand Cross of the Order of Orange-Nassau (Netherlands), and Commander of the Order of the Dannebrog (Denmark). He was honoured by France with the Croix de Guerre and the Legion of Honour. He was awarded the British Distinguished Service Cross on three occasions.

=== Postwar career ===
In 1946, Storheill was Commander and Chief of Naval Staff, 1946 and 1949 he became chief of Coastal Squadron. Storheill was promoted to vice admiral in 1951 and was until 1954 Chief of the Navy.

From 1954 to 1958, Storheill was chief of the Norwegian military mission to the United States. He was also a member of the NATO Military Committee and the liaison officer to NATO's Allied Command Atlantic with its headquarters in Norfolk, Virginia, USA.

In 1958 Storheill became commander of Supreme Northern Norway with headquarters in Harstad. Storheill moved to Bodø in 1963 and there opened a new and bigger war headquarters at Reitan. He oversaw a period when NATO changed its strategy from massive retaliation to so-called flexible response, which resulted in an ever-increasing NATO training operations in Northern Norway from 1964.

Storheill ended his military career as director of the Joint Staff College from 1967 to 1969 and spent his last years in Drøbak.

== Honours and awards ==
- War Cross with Sword
- Commander with Star of the Order of St. Olav
- St. Olav's Medal With Oak Branch
- War Medal
- Defence Medal 1940–1945
- Haakon VII's 70-Medal
- Distinguished Service Cross and 2 bars (United Kingdom)
- Commander of the Order of the Dannebrog (Denmark)
- Officer of the Legion of Merit (United States)
- Commander of the Legion of Honour (France)
- Croix de guerre 1939–1945 (France)
- Grand Cross of the Order of the House of Orange
