= War Medal =

A war medal is a military decoration awarded in time of war, as opposed to a service medal. It may refer to, for example:

- War Medal (Norway)
- Campaign medal
- Global War on Terrorism Service Medal
- British War Medal, British Empire medal for service in World War I
- War Medal 1939–1945, British Commonwealth and Empire medal for service in World War II
- War Medal of 1915, another name for the Ottoman Gallipoli Star
