= Geir Indrefjord =

Norwegian politician

State Secretary at the Norwegian Ministry of Finance
- In office 13 October 2023 – 4 February 2025
- Prime Minister: Jonas Gahr Støre
- Minister: Trygve Slagsvold Vedum

State Secretary at the Norwegian Ministry of Justice and Public Security
- In office 11 November 2022 – 13 October 2023
- Prime Minister: Jonas Gahr Støre
- Minister: Emilie Enger Mehl

State Secretary at the Norwegian Ministry of Finance (acting)
- In office 21 February 2022 – 4 November 2022
- Prime Minister: Jonas Gahr Støre
- Minister: Trygve Slagsvold Vedum

Personal details
- Born: Geir Indrefjord Høllesli; January 29, 1987 (age 39) Stavanger, Norway
- Citizenship: Norway
- Party: Centre
- Education: University of Bergen; Norwegian School of Economics; The Norwegian Defence University College; Norwegian University of Science and Technology; University Centre in Svalbard; London School of Economics; MGIMO; University of Oxford; University of Urbino; Università per Stranieri di Siena
- Occupation: Politician
- Profession: Physician and economist
- Awards: Inge Steensland's grant

Military service
- Branch/service: Norwegian Army
- Years of service: 2007-2010
- Rank: Lieutenant

Geir Indrefjord (born 29 January 1987) is a Norwegian politician for the Centre Party and a former State Secretary at the Norwegian Ministry of Finance and the Norwegian Ministry of Justice and Public Security.

== Background ==
Indrefjord has previously worked as a roughneck and as a military interpreter. He is a graduate of economics and business administration, a trained physician and an associate professor, and holds several academic degrees from the University of Bergen, the Norwegian National Defence University College and others. He has studied in the United Kingdom, Russia, Italy and the Netherlands, among other countries. He is a veteran of the Norwegian Armed Forces and served in the Norwegian PRT in Maimana, Afghanistan from 2008 til 2010.

== Political career ==
From February 2022 to February 2025 Indrefjord served as a State Secretary for Trygve Slagsvold Vedum at the Norwegian Ministry of Finance, except for the period from November 2022-October 2023 when he served as a State Secretary for Emilie Enger Mehl at the Norwegian Ministry for Justice and Public Security. Indrefjord was the leader of the Bergen Centre Youth 2013-2015 and the leader of the Hordaland Centre Youth 2014-2016. Since 2016 he has been fiscal policy advisor to the Center Party parliamentary group in the Norwegian Storting.

== Trivia ==
Indrefjord is a twin. He and his twin brother Mats Indrefjord Høllesli each won a first prize in the Norwegian Young Scientists Competition 2006 and participated at the London International Youth Science Forum

Indrefjord comes from Tasta in Stavanger, and lives in Vinterbro in Ås. He spent most of his young adulthood in Bergen.
