= Margit Johnsen =

Norwegian sailor in the merchant navy (1913–1987)

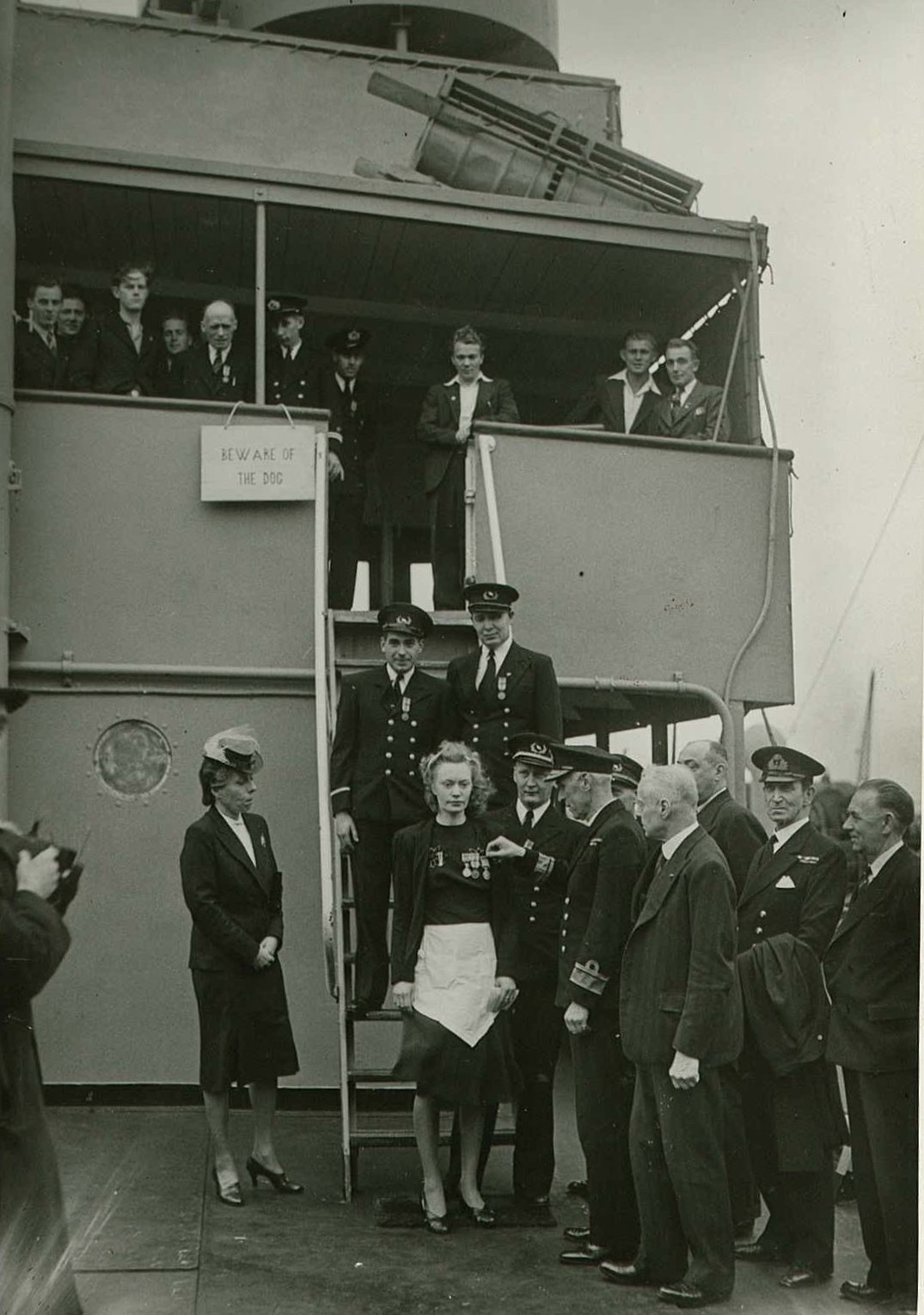
Some of the crew from the Norwegian merchant ship MV Talabot. The messroom girl Margit Johnsen from Ålesund in centre, receiving British Empire Medal from Rear Admiral J.S.M. Ritchie.

Margit Johnsen Godø, BEM, nicknamed Malta-Margit, (31 January 1913 – 20 July 1987) was a Norwegian sailor in the merchant navy. For her service on a merchant vessel in convoy to Malta in 1942 she was awarded the St. Olav's Medal with Oak Branch and several other gallantry decorations. Johnsen continued her work in the Norwegian merchant fleet until 1960. Her story is told in maritime and wartime history as an example of Norwegian women's effort during World War II.

== Torpedoed in June 1940 ==
Johnsen worked for the Norwegian shipping company Wilh. Wilhelmsen as a messroom girl. She worked on board MV Tudor, which was in the Mediterranean Sea when Germany invaded Norway on 9 April 1940. The ship left Gibraltar on 12 June and sailed in convoy for United Kingdom. On 19 June 1940 MV Tudor was torpedoed and sunk northwest of Cape Finisterre by the German submarine U-48. Johnsen and the rest of the crew, except one, survived the sinking.

== Convoy to Malta (1942) ==
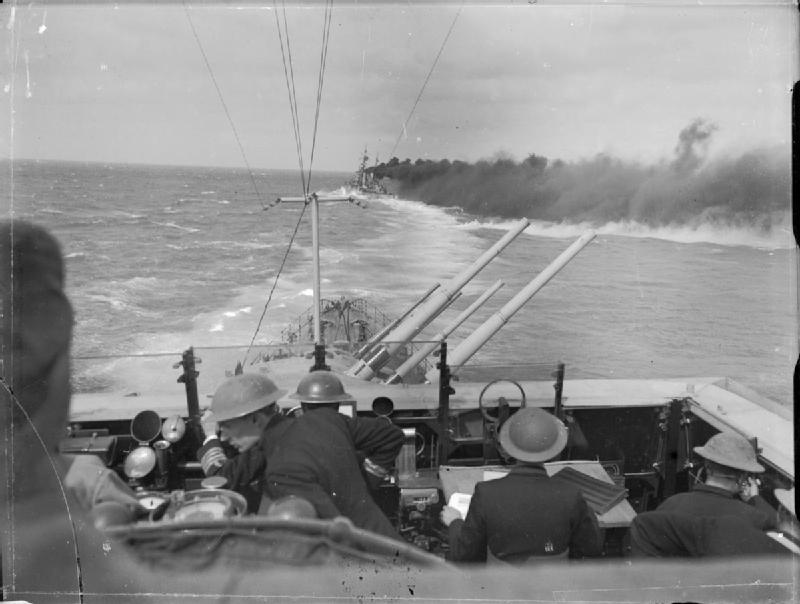
MV Talabot was part of a convoy escorted by a large group of British warships. In this photo, two of the warships, the cruisers HMS Cleopatra and HMS Euryalus have engaged Italian warships on 22 March 1942. Smoke is dispersed between the convoy and the Italian attackers so that the merchant vessels can escape.

As the Axis powers laid siege to the strategically important British colony of Malta in 1942, Johnsen was sailing on MV Talabot, a general cargo vessel trading in the Mediterranean Sea. While in Alexandria in Egypt her vessel was ordered to join a convoy for Malta. Due to great losses the Malta convoys were known as the death convoys. The convoy that Margit Johnsen's vessel was about to join, with the codename MW10, was known as a suicide mission. Albert Toft, the captain on MV Talabot, granted Johnsen permission to leave the vessel in Egypt, but she declined the offer and choose to stay with her shipmates on the dangerous voyage. The four general cargo vessels in the convoy were three British; MV Breconshire, MV Clan Campbell, MV Pampas and the Norwegian MV Talabot. They were loaded with supplies such as ammunition, gasoline, paraffin, coal and grain as well as other goods that the besieged island needed. The importance of the convoy was shown by the fact that the four merchant ships was escorted by 20 British warships (4 cruisers and 16 destroyers) under the command of Rear admiral Philip Vian; an escort of 4 warships for 20 merchant ships was usually viewed as good.

During attacks she went around serving coffee, smiling and seemingly unaffected she showed me a shell fragment she had in her pocket, it had hit the steel helmet that she, like the rest of us, had on our heads. In all she was a marvellous example of courage and composure.

— Albert Toft, captain of the MV Talabot

The convoy departed Alexandria on 20 March 1942 and was attacked two days later by Italian warships and Italian and German aircraft. The engagement is known as the Second Battle of Sirte. MV Breconshire was heavily damaged and MV Clan Campbell was sunk, but MV Pampas and MV Talabot reached Malta.

In the harbour of Valletta MV Talabot met new attacks from German and Italian aircraft while the unloading proceeded. The ship was hit by bombs, caught fire and was scuttled by its crew to avoid explosions of ammunition and fuel. Both during the passage from Alexandria and while in harbour in Valletta, Johnsen stood out for her courage and braveness in her support for the crew. The captain calculated her behaviour to be of great importance for maintaining morale. Together with the captain and the ship's cat, Johnsen was the last from the crew to leave MV Talabot when the ship was evacuated on 27 March 1942.

The story of Margit Johnsen is told in books about the Norwegian merchant navy during World War II as an example of women's contribution to the war effort.

After the sinking Johnsen was sent from Malta to the United Kingdom. She continued to work on Norwegian merchant ships and served on MV Tarifa, MV Tai Yin, MV Toulouse and finally the MT Fagerfjell, which she returned with to Norway in December 1945.

== After the war ==
Johnsen sailed on Norwegian merchant vessels until around 1960. She married and took the surname Godø.

Johnsen received the Ulabrand-statuette.

In 2013 a bust to her memory was erected in Ålesund. The place where the monument was erected were named Margit Johnsens Square.

== Decorations ==
Johnsen received several decorations for her war effort. She is the only female recipient of the Norwegian military award St. Olav's Medal with Oak Branch. For having served more than 18 months on merchant vessels in dangerous areas, Johnsen was awarded the War Medal. Her effort on MV Talabot was honoured by the British with the British Empire Medal "for without fear having served coffee and other refreshments to sailors on the bridge and by the guns during a severe air raid on the ship while it was heading for Malta."

== See also ==
- Nortraship
