= Pacific Star =

United Kingdom military campaign medal for service in the Second World War

The Pacific Star
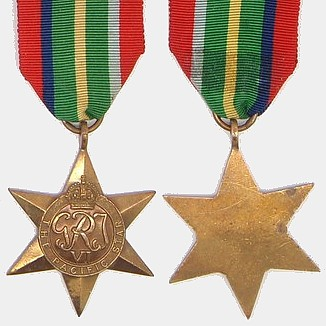
- Type: Military campaign medal
- Awarded for: Service in operational area
- Country: United Kingdom
- Presented by: the Monarch of the United Kingdom and the Dominions of the British Commonwealth, and Emperor of India
- Eligibility: All Ranks
- Campaign: Pacific 1941–1945
- Clasps: BURMA
- Established: May 1945
- Ribbon bar without and with Burma Clasp rosette

Order of wear
- Next (higher): Africa Star
- Next (lower): Burma Star
- Related: Burma Star

The Pacific Star is a military campaign medal instituted by the United Kingdom in May 1945 for award to British and Commonwealth forces who served in the Pacific Campaign from 1941 to 1945, during the Second World War.

One clasp, Burma, was instituted to be worn on the medal ribbon.

== The Second World War Stars ==
On 8 July 1943, the 1939–43 Star (later named the 1939–1945 Star) and the Africa Star became the first two campaign stars instituted by the United Kingdom, and by May 1945 a total of eight stars and nine clasps had been established to reward campaign service during the Second World War. One more campaign star, the Arctic Star, and one more clasp, the Bomber Command Clasp, were belatedly added on 26 February 2013, more than sixty-seven years after the end of the war.

Including the Arctic Star and the Bomber Command clasp, no-one could be awarded more than six campaign stars, with five of the ten clasps denoting service that would have qualified for a second star. Only one clasp could be worn on any one campaign star. The maximum of six possible stars are the following:

- The 1939–1945 Star with, when awarded, either the Battle of Britain or the Bomber Command clasp.
- Only one of the Atlantic Star, Air Crew Europe Star or France and Germany Star. Those earning more than one received the first qualified for, with the second denoted by the appropriate ribbon clasp.
- The Arctic Star.
- The Africa Star with, if awarded, the first earned of clasps for North Africa 1942–43, 8th Army or 1st Army.
- Either the Pacific Star or Burma Star. Those earning both received the first qualified for, with the appropriate clasp to represent the second.
- The Italy Star.

All recipients of campaign stars also received the War Medal.

== Institution ==
At the same time as the Second World War campaigns against Axis Forces in Africa and Europe, Allied forces were also fighting the Japanese in the Pacific. This campaign began on 8 December 1941, the day the Japanese attacked Hong Kong, a British Colony in Far East . It took place in the sea and air of the Pacific Ocean as well as on land, with Japanese forces quickly invading Malaya, Singapore and the Philippines. While the Japanese advance across the Pacific was stemmed by mid–1942 the war continued, both at sea and on numerous Pacific islands, until the final Japanese surrender on 2 September 1945.

The Pacific Star was instituted by the United Kingdom in May 1945 for award to those who had served in operations in the Pacific Campaign from 8 December 1941 to 2 September 1945.

== Award criteria ==
The eligibility criteria for the award of the Pacific Star were different for service at sea, on land and in the air.

=== General ===
No recipient could receive both the Pacific and the Burma Stars. A clasp inscribed 'Burma' was instituted to be worn on the Pacific Star's ribbon by those who earned the Pacific Star and who subsequently qualified for the Burma Star.

The award of a gallantry medal or Mention in Dispatches qualified the recipient for the award of the Pacific Star, regardless of service duration. Those whose qualifying service period was terminated prematurely by their death or disability due to service were also awarded the Star.

=== Service afloat ===
Naval personnel qualified for service at sea within certain specified boundaries.

Between 8 December 1941 and 2 September 1945, once the 1939–1945 Star had already been earned, Naval and Merchant Navy service of one or more days in the Pacific Ocean, including the South China Sea, and in the Indian Ocean east of a line running due south from Singapore round the south-east coast of Sumatra, through Christmas Island, and southwards along the Meridian of 110° East qualified for the award of the Pacific Star.

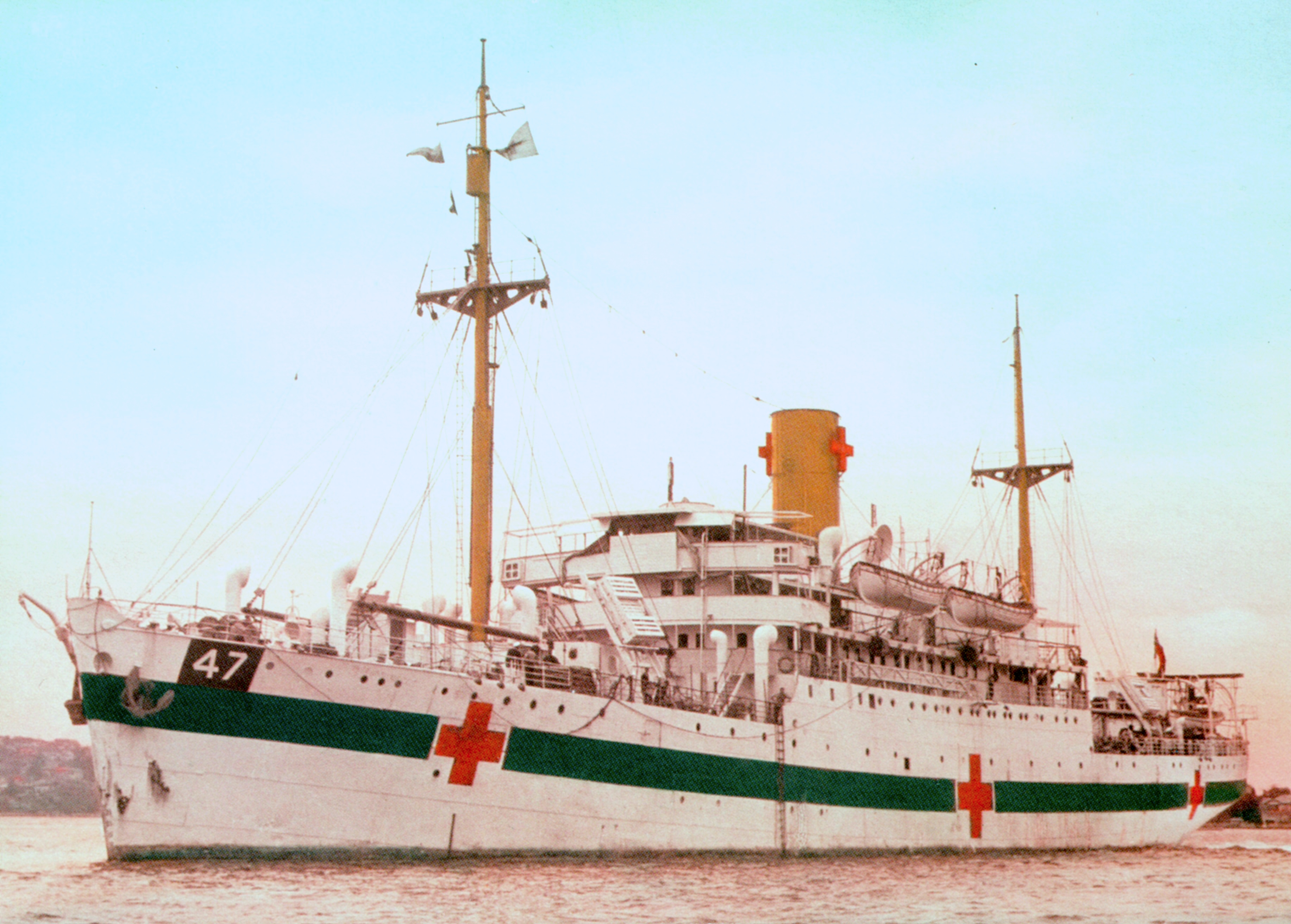
AHS Centaur

In 1994, the Australian government conducted a review of the conditions for award of the Pacific Star, as set out in Command Paper 6833 of June 1946. As a result, the conditions for award were amended to include any member of the Australian military who was on board the Australian Hospital Ship Centaur when it was torpedoed and sunk on 14 May 1943. The Pacific Star can be awarded to these men and women regardless of whether they had been awarded or were eligible for the 1939–1945 Star, the Australia Service Medal 1939–1945 or any other campaign award.

Certain special conditions applied governing the award of the Pacific Star to those Naval personnel who entered operational service less than six months before the end of the war. Those who entered operational service in the qualifying area on or after 7 March 1945 and who did not thereafter serve in the area qualifying for the Burma Star, could qualify for the Pacific Star by entry into operational service. In such cases, however, the 1939–1945 Star could not be awarded for service of less than 180 days.

=== Service ashore ===
Army, Naval and Air Force personnel serving ashore in those territories which had been subjected to enemy or allied invasions had no prior time restriction and qualified upon entry into the prescribed area of land operations.

Qualifying service on land was restricted to operational service in the following territories in which there had been enemy or Allied invasions, service in Burma excluded and all dates inclusive:

- Bismarck Archipelago from 22 January 1942 to 2 September 1945.
- British North Borneo, Brunei, Sarawak and Dutch Borneo from 8 December 1941 to 2 September 1945.
- Caroline Islands from 8 December 1941 to 2 September 1945.
- Celebes from 26 January 1942 to 2 September 1945.
- China from 11 December 1941 to 15 February 1942.
- Gilbert and Ellice Islands from 10 December 1941 to 2 September 1945.
- Guam from 12 December 1941 to 2 September 1945.
- Hong Kong from 8 December 1941 to 25 December 1941.
- Iwo Jima from 8 December 1941 to 25 December 1941.
- Java from 5 March 1942 to 2 September 1945.
- Malaya from 8 December 1941 to 15 February 1942.
- Marianas from 8 December 1941 to 2 September 1945.
- Marshall Islands from 8 December 1941 to 2 September 1945.
- Molucca Islands from 30 January 1942 to 2 September 1945.
- Nauru from 8 December 1941 to 2 September 1945.
- New Guinea from 7 March 1942 to 2 September 1945.
- Ocean Island from 8 December 1941 to 2 September 1945.
- Okinawa from 8 December 1941 to 2 September 1945.
- Philippines Islands from 10 December 1941 to 2 September 1945.
- Solomon Islands (British Solomon Islands Protectorate and Australian Mandated Territory) from 1 February 1942 to 2 September 1945.
- Sumatra from 14 February 1942 to 23 March 1942.
- Timor from 20 February 1942 to 2 September 1945.
- Wake Island from 22 December 1941 to 2 September 1945.

Service in China, Hong Kong, Malaya and Sumatra after the respective end dates listed above was recognised by the award of the Burma Star.

Service in Norfolk Island, New Caledonia, New Hebrides, Fiji Islands, Tonga Islands, Phoenix Islands and Fanning Island did not qualify for the Pacific Star.

=== Airborne Service ===
Air crew engaged in operations against the enemy qualified, provided they had already earned the 1939–1945 Star and had completed at least one operational sortie over the appropriate sea or land area. Air crew on transport or ferrying duties qualified by at least three landings in any of the qualifying land areas.

Troops who took part in airborne operations in a qualifying area for land operations qualified by entry into operational service.

== Description ==
The set of nine campaign stars was designed by the Royal Mint engravers. The stars all have a ring suspender that passes through an eyelet formed above the uppermost point of the star. They are six–pointed stars, struck in yellow copper zinc alloy to fit into a 44 millimetres diameter circle, with a maximum width of 38 millimetres and 50 millimetres high from the bottom point of the star to the top of the eyelet.

Obverse

The obverse has a central design of the Royal Cypher "GRI VI", surmounted by a crown. A circlet, the top of which is covered by the crown, surrounds the cypher and is inscribed "THE PACIFIC STAR".

Reverse

The reverse is plain.

Naming

The British Honours Committee decided that Second World War campaign medals awarded to British forces would be issued unnamed, a policy applied by all but three British Commonwealth countries. The recipient's details were impressed on the reverse of the stars awarded to Indians, South Africans and, after a campaign led by veteran organisations, to Australians. In the case of South Africans and Australians, naming consisted of the recipient's force number, initials and surname in block capitals, with awards to Indians also showing the service arm or corps.

Clasp

The clasp, designed to be sewn onto the medal's ribbon, was struck in yellow copper zinc alloy and has a frame with an inside edge that resembles the perforated edge of a postage stamp. When medals are not worn, a silver rosette is worn on the ribbon bar to denote the award of the clasp.

Ribbon

The ribbon is 32 millimetres wide with a 5½ millimetres wide Army red band, a 3 millimetres wide navy blue band, a 6 millimetres wide dark green band, a 3 millimetres wide yellow band, a 6 millimetres wide dark green band, a 3 millimetres wide Royal Air Force blue band and a 5½ millimetres wide Army red band. The forests and beaches of the Pacific are represented by the dark green and yellow bands respectively, while the Royal Navy and Merchant Navy, the Armies and the Air Forces are represented by the dark blue, red and light blue bands respectively.

The ribbons for this medal and the Defence Medal as well as those of the other Second World War campaign stars, with the exception of the Arctic Star, were devised by King George VI.

== Order of wear ==
The order of wear of the Second World War campaign stars was determined by their respective campaign start dates and by the campaign's duration. This is the order worn, even when a recipient qualified for them in a different order. The Defence Medal and War Medal are worn after the stars. The Canadian Volunteer Service Medal is worn after the Defence Medal and before the War Medal, with other Commonwealth war medals worn after the War Medal.

- The 1939–1945 Star, from 3 September 1939 to 2 September 1945, the full duration of the Second World War.
- The Atlantic Star, from 3 September 1939 to 8 May 1945, the duration of the Battle of the Atlantic and the War in Europe.
- The Arctic Star, from 3 September 1939 to 8 May 1945, the duration of the Arctic Convoys and the War in Europe.
- The Air Crew Europe Star, from 3 September 1939 to 5 June 1944, the period until D-Day minus one.
- The Africa Star, from 10 June 1940 to 12 May 1943, the duration of the North African Campaign.
- The Pacific Star, from 8 December 1941 to 2 September 1945, the duration of the Pacific War.
- The Burma Star, from 11 December 1941 to 2 September 1945, the duration of the Burma Campaign.
- The Italy Star, from 11 June 1943 to 8 May 1945, the duration of the Italian Campaign.
- The France and Germany Star, from 6 June 1944 to 8 May 1945, the duration of the North West Europe Campaign.
- The Defence Medal, from 3 September 1939 to 8 May 1945 (2 September 1945 for those serving in the Far East and the Pacific), the duration of the Second World War.
- The War Medal, from 3 September 1939 to 2 September 1945, the full duration of the Second World War.

The Pacific Star is therefore worn as shown:

- Preceded by the Africa Star.
- Succeeded by the Burma Star, but that ribbon could not be awarded together with the Pacific Star. As such, on any bar the Pacific Star would be followed by the Italy Star or another medal that was lower in the order of precedence.
