= HNoMS Stord (G26) =

Norwegian navy destroyer during WWII

- HNoMS Stord in December 1943

History

United Kingdom
- Name: Success
- Builder: J. Samuel White
- Laid down: 25 February 1942
- Launched: 3 March 1943
- Fate: Transferred to Norway

Norway
- Name: Stord
- Namesake: The island of Stord
- Commissioned: 26 August 1943
- Fate: Sold for scrapping 1959

General characteristics
- Class & type: S-class destroyer
- Displacement: 1,710 long tons (1,740 t) (standard); 2,530 long tons (2,570 t) (deep load)
- Length: 362 ft 9 in (110.6 m) (o/a)
- Beam: 35 ft 9 in (10.9 m)
- Draught: 14 ft 6 in (4.4 m) (deep)
- Installed power: 40,000 shp (30,000 kW); 2 × Admiralty 3-drum boilers
- Propulsion: 2 × shafts; 2 × Parsons geared steam turbines
- Speed: 36 knots (67 km/h; 41 mph)
- Range: 4,675 nmi (8,658 km; 5,380 mi) at 20 knots (37 km/h; 23 mph)
- Complement: 170
- Sensors & processing systems: Radar Type 290 air warning; Radar Type 285 ranging & bearing
- Armament: 4 × single 4.7-inch (120 mm) Mark XII dual-purpose guns; 1 × twin Bofors 40 mm AA guns; 4 × twin QF 20 mm Oerlikon AA guns; 2 × quadruple 21-inch torpedo tubes; 4 × throwers and 2 × racks for 70 depth charges

HNoMS Stord was a Royal Norwegian Navy destroyer during the Second World War. She was built for the Royal Navy as the S-class destroyer HMS Success, but was transferred prior to completion in 1943 to the Norwegian Armed Forces in exile. Stord survived the war and remained in service with the RNN until 1959.

== Description ==
Stord displaced 1,710 long tons (1,740 t) at standard load and 2,530 long tons (2,570 t) at deep load. She had an overall length of 362 feet 9 inches (110.6 m), a beam of 35 feet 8 inches (10.9 m) and a deep draught of 14 feet 6 inches (4.4 m). She was powered by two Parsons geared steam turbines, each driving one propeller shaft, using steam provided by two Admiralty three-drum boilers. The turbines developed a total of 40,000 shaft horsepower (30,000 kW) and gave a maximum speed of 36 knots (67 km/h; 41 mph). Stord carried a maximum of 615 long tons (625 t) of fuel oil that gave her a range of 4,675 nautical miles (8,658 km; 5,380 mi) at 20 knots (37 km/h; 23 mph). Her complement was 170 officers and ratings.

The ship was armed with four 45-calibre 4.7-inch (120 mm) Mark XII guns in dual-purpose mounts. For anti-aircraft (AA) defence, Stord had one twin mount for Bofors 40 mm guns and four twin 20-millimetre (0.8 in) Oerlikon autocannon. She was fitted with two above-water quadruple mounts for 21-inch (533 mm) torpedoes. Two depth charge rails and four throwers were fitted for which 70 depth charges were provided.

== Construction and career ==
She was laid down as HMS Success, but transferred to the Norwegians before completion. She was renamed HNoMS Stord when commissioned on 26 August 1943 under the command of Lt.-Cdr. Skule Storheill. The ship served in the Home Fleet in the 23rd Destroyer Flotilla.

She played an important role in the Battle of the North Cape sinking of the German battleship Scharnhorst. Stord went in as close as 400 yards (360 m) to the Scharnhorst before firing 8 torpedoes, some of which hit their target. After the battle, Admiral Fraser sent the following message to the Admiralty: "... Please convey to the C-in-C Norwegian Navy. Stord played a very daring role in the fight and I am very proud of her...". In an interview in The Evening News on 5 January 1944, the commanding officer of HMS Duke of York said: "... the Norwegian destroyer Stord carried out the most daring attack of the whole action..."

In June 1944 Stord also took part in the Normandy landings.

=== Postwar ===
Stord was officially purchased from the UK government in 1946 and scrapped in Belgium in 1959.

A model of Stord (approximately 300:1) can be seen in the D-Day museum at Arromanches, Normandy.

On 28 September 2014, Håkon Nilsen (1913-1976), the torpedo commander aboard Stord during the Scharnhorst attack, was the first Norwegian war veteran who in recognition of heroic service was posthumously awarded the Arctic Star by the United Kingdom.

In 2015 another Arctic Star was awarded to Chief Petty Officer Arne Olsen (1917-1990) who saw active service for the Norwegian Navy.

== Bibliography ==
- Chesneau, Roger, ed. (1980). Conway's All the World's Fighting Ships 1922–1946. Greenwich, UK: Conway Maritime Press. ISBN 0-85177-146-7.
- Colledge, J. J.; Warlow, Ben (2006) [1969]. Ships of the Royal Navy: The Complete Record of All Fighting Ships of the Royal Navy from the 15th Century to the Present (3rd Rev ed.). London: Chatham Publishing. ISBN 978-1-86176-281-8. OCLC 67375475.
- English, John (2001). Obdurate to Daring: British Fleet Destroyers 1941–45. Windsor, UK: World Ship Society. ISBN 978-0-9560769-0-8.
- Lenton, H. T. (1998). British & Empire Warships of the Second World War. Annapolis, Maryland: Naval Institute Press. ISBN 1-55750-048-7.
- Raven, Alan; Roberts, John (1978). War Built Destroyers O to Z Classes. London: Bivouac Books. ISBN 0-85680-010-4.
- Whitley, M. J. (1988). Destroyers of World War 2. Annapolis, Maryland: Naval Institute Press. ISBN 0-87021-326-1.
