= Africa Star =

United Kingdom military campaign medal for service in the Second World War

The Africa Star
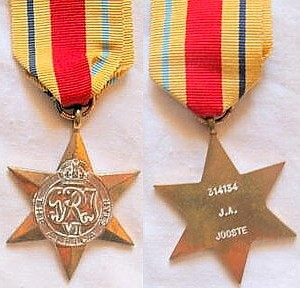
- Awarded to a South African, 314134 J.A. Jooste
- Type: Military campaign medal
- Awarded for: Entry into operational area
- Country: United Kingdom
- Presented by: the Monarch of the United Kingdom and the Dominions of the British Commonwealth, and Emperor of India
- Eligibility: All Ranks
- Campaign: North Africa 1940–1943
- Clasps: NORTH AFRICA 1942–43; 8th ARMY; 1st ARMY
- Established: 8 July 1943
- First award: 1943
- Ribbon bar North Africa 1942–43, 8th Army and 1st Army insignia

Order of wear
- Next (higher): Air Crew Europe Star
- Next (lower): Pacific Star

The Africa Star is a military campaign medal, instituted by the United Kingdom on 8 July 1943 for award to British and Commonwealth forces who served in North Africa between 10 June 1940 and 12 May 1943 during the Second World War.

Three clasps were instituted to be worn on the medal ribbon: North Africa 1942–43, 8th Army and 1st Army.

== The Second World War Stars ==
On 8 July 1943, the 1939–43 Star (later named the 1939–1945 Star) and the Africa Star became the first two campaign stars instituted, and by May 1945 a total of eight stars and nine clasps had been established by the United Kingdom to reward campaign service during the Second World War. One more campaign star, the Arctic Star, and one more clasp, the Bomber Command Clasp, were belatedly added on 26 February 2013, more than sixty-seven years after the end of the war.

Including the Arctic Star and the Bomber Command clasp, no-one could be awarded more than six campaign stars, with five of the ten clasps awarded denoting service that would have qualified for a second star. Only one clasp could be worn on any one campaign star. The maximum of six possible stars are the following:

- The 1939–1945 Star with, when awarded, either the Battle of Britain or the Bomber Command clasp.
- Only one of the Atlantic Star, Air Crew Europe Star or France and Germany Star. Those earning more than one received the first qualified for, with the second denoted by the appropriate ribbon clasp.
- The Arctic Star.
- The Africa Star with, if awarded, the first earned of clasps for North Africa 1942–43, 8th Army or 1st Army.
- Either the Pacific Star or Burma Star. Those earning both received the first qualified for, with the appropriate clasp to represent the second.
- The Italy Star.

All recipients of campaign stars also received the War Medal.

== Institution ==
Between 10 June 1940 and 12 May 1943 British forces fought in North Africa against the Germans and Italians, who had control of large areas of Egypt, Libya and Tunisia and therefore threatened the Suez Canal and the approaching sea lanes. During the desert conflict the balance of power alternated between the two sides, until the remaining German forces surrendered at Tunis on 12 May 1943. Some historians consider the victory over the German forces in North Africa to have been the turning point in the war which led to the eventual defeat of Germany.

The institution of the Africa Star was announced on 8 July 1943 and in August it was announced that the first uniform ribbon bars would be issued to qualifying personnel later in that year. The medals themselves were not intended to be available until after the cessation of hostilities. Some ribbon issues to overseas troops were delayed, but many had been received by the end of 1943. By March 1944 1,500,000 personnel had received Africa Star ribbon bars, with further awards made by the end of the war.

Three clasps were instituted: 'North Africa 1942–43', '8th Army' and '1st Army', of which only the first to be earned may be worn on the ribbon of the Africa Star.

== Award criteria ==
=== Medal ===
The Africa Star was awarded for a minimum of one day's service in an operational area of North Africa between 10 June 1940 and 12 May 1943. The operational area includes the whole of the area between the Suez Canal and the Strait of Gibraltar, together with Malta, Ethiopian Empire, Kenya, the Sudan, both Somalilands and Eritrea. Areas not bordering on the Mediterranean only qualified for the Africa Star between 10 June 1940 and 27 November 1941 inclusive.

- Royal Navy and Merchant Navy personnel qualified for the award of the Africa Star through service in the Mediterranean between these two dates, or for service in the campaigns in Abyssinia, Somaliland and Eritrea between 10 June 1940 and 27 September 1941. Merchant Navy personnel also qualified with service in operations off the Moroccan coast between 8 November 1942 and 12 May 1943. For sea-going service there was no condition that the 1939-45 Star should already have been earned before the Africa Star could be awarded.
- Army personnel had to enter North Africa on the establishment of an operational unit, while service in Abyssinia, Sudan, Somaliland and Eritrea also qualified.
- Air Force personnel had to land in or have flown over any of the operational areas. The Africa Star was also awarded to crews of transport aircraft that flew over certain specified routes.
- Members of the Australian Imperial Force qualified for the award of the Africa Star for service in Syria between 8 June and 11 July 1941.

Service in West Africa did not qualify for the award of the Africa Star.

=== Clasps ===
Regulations issued in 1945 only allow one clasp, the first one qualified for, to be worn with the Africa Star. Despite this, both the 8th Army and 1st Army clasps were awarded to and worn by, inter alia, General Dwight Eisenhower and Field Marshal Harold Alexander.

- The North Africa 1942–43 Clasp was awarded for service with the 18th Army Group Headquarters between 15 February 1942 and 12 February 1943 inclusive, for Navy and Merchant Navy personnel in shore service, or for Air Force service in specified areas from 23 October 1942 to 12 May 1943 inclusive. In undress, a silver rosette worn on the ribbon bar denotes the award of this clasp.
- The 8th Army Clasp was awarded for service with the Eighth Army between 23 October 1942 and 12 May 1943 inclusive. An Arabic numeral "8" is worn on the ribbon bar in undress to denote the award of this clasp.
- The 1st Army Clasp was awarded for service with the First Army between 8 November 1942 and 12 May 1943 inclusive. An Arabic numeral "1" is worn on the ribbon bar in undress to denote the award of this clasp.

== Description ==
The set of nine campaign stars was designed by the Royal Mint engravers. The stars all have a ring suspender that passes through an eyelet formed above the uppermost point of the star. They are six–pointed stars, struck in yellow copper zinc alloy to fit into a 44 millimetres diameter circle, with a maximum width of 38 millimetres and 50 millimetres high from the bottom point of the star to the top of the eyelet.

Obverse

The obverse has a central design of the Royal Cypher "GRI VI", surmounted by a crown. A circlet, the top of which is covered by the crown, surrounds the cypher and is inscribed "THE AFRICA STAR".

Reverse

The reverse is plain.

Naming

The British Honours Committee decided that Second World War campaign medals awarded to British forces would be issued unnamed, a policy applied by all but three British Commonwealth countries. The recipient's name was impressed on the reverse of the stars awarded to Indians, South Africans and, after a campaign led by veteran organisations, to Australians. In the case of Indians, naming consisted of the recipient's force number, rank, initials, surname and service arm or corps, and in the case of South Africans of the force number, initials and surname, in block capitals.

Clasps

All three clasps were struck in yellow copper zinc alloy and have a frame with an inside edge that resembles the perforated edge of a postage stamp. They are inscribed "NORTH AFRICA 1942–43", "8th ARMY" and "1st ARMY" respectively and were designed to be sewn onto the medal's ribbon. Regulations only allow one clasp, the first earned, to be worn with the Star. When the ribbon is worn alone, a silver Arabic numeral "8", numeral "1" or rosette is worn on the ribbon bar to denote the award of the respective clasp.

Ribbon

The ribbon is 32 millimetres wide, with a 5 millimetres wide pale buff band, a 1½ millimetres wide Navy blue band, a 5 millimetres wide pale buff band, a 9 millimetres wide Army red band, a 5 millimetres wide pale buff band, a 1½ millimetres wide Air Force blue band and a 5 millimetres wide pale buff band. The pale buff represents the sand of the Sahara Desert while the Royal Navy and Merchant Navy, the Armies and the Air Forces are represented by the dark blue, red and light blue bands respectively.

The ribbons for this medal and the Defence Medal as well as those of the other Second World War campaign stars, with the exception of the Arctic Star, were devised by King George VI.

== Order of wear ==
The order of wear of the Second World War campaign stars was determined by their respective campaign start dates and by the campaign's duration. This is the order worn, even when a recipient qualified for them in a different order. The Defence Medal and War Medal are worn after the stars. The Canadian Volunteer Service Medal is worn after the Defence Medal and before the War Medal, with other Commonwealth war medals worn after the War Medal.

- The 1939–1945 Star, from 3 September 1939 to 2 September 1945, the full duration of the Second World War.
- The Atlantic Star, from 3 September 1939 to 8 May 1945, the duration of the Battle of the Atlantic and the War in Europe.
- The Arctic Star, from 3 September 1939 to 8 May 1945, the duration of the Arctic Convoys and the War in Europe.
- The Air Crew Europe Star, from 3 September 1939 to 5 June 1944, the period until D-Day minus one.
- The Africa Star, from 10 June 1940 to 12 May 1943, the duration of the North African Campaign.
- The Pacific Star, from 8 December 1941 to 2 September 1945, the duration of the Pacific War.
- The Burma Star, from 11 December 1941 to 2 September 1945, the duration of the Burma Campaign.
- The Italy Star, from 11 June 1943 to 8 May 1945, the duration of the Italian Campaign.
- The France and Germany Star, from 6 June 1944 to 8 May 1945, the duration of the North-West Europe Campaign.
- The Defence Medal, from 3 September 1939 to 8 May 1945 (2 September 1945 for those serving in the Far East and the Pacific), the duration of the Second World War.
- The War Medal, from 3 September 1939 to 2 September 1945, the full duration of the Second World War.

An example order of wear for three awards:

Order of wear by campaign start date
Air Crew Europe Star	Africa Star	Pacific Star
Air Crew Europe Star	Africa Star	Pacific Star
