= Inge Steensland =

Inge Steensland (26 November 1923 – 18 September 2010) was a Norwegian resistance leader and shipping magnate. As a member of Kompani Linge, he participated in several commando raids during the German occupation of Norway, and was also part of the Invasion of Normandy in June 1944. For his efforts during the war, he was awarded the Norwegian War Cross with Sword, the highest ranking Norwegian gallantry decoration. After the war he made a fortune through his share in the shipping company Solvang, as well as real estate investments. In 2004, he received The King's Medal of Merit in silver, for his civilian work after the war. He also received the Norwegian War Medal, Defence Medal 1940–1945 and the British Distinguished Service Cross.
