= Italy Star =

United Kingdom military campaign medal for service in the Second World War

The Italy Star
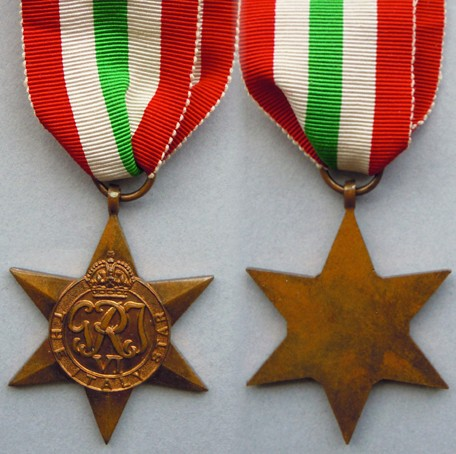
- Type: Military campaign medal
- Awarded for: Entry into operational area
- Country: United Kingdom
- Presented by: the Monarch of the United Kingdom and the Dominions of the British Commonwealth, and Emperor of India
- Eligibility: All Ranks
- Campaign: Italy 1943–1945
- Established: May 1945
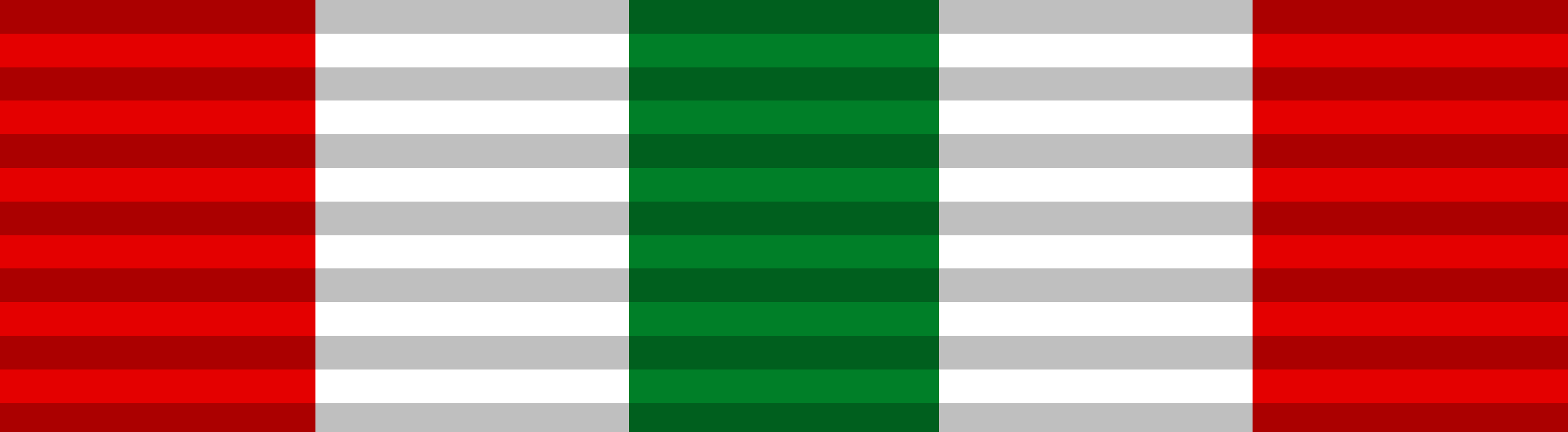
- Ribbon bar

Order of wear
- Next (higher): Burma Star
- Next (lower): France and Germany Star
- Related: France: Italian campaign medal 1943–44

The Italy Star is a military campaign medal, instituted by the United Kingdom in May 1945 for award to British Commonwealth forces who served in the Italian Campaign from 1943 to 1945, during the Second World War.

== The Second World War Stars ==
On 8 July 1943, the 1939–43 Star (later named the 1939–1945 Star) and the Africa Star became the first two campaign stars instituted by the United Kingdom, and by May 1945 a total of eight stars and nine clasps had been established to reward campaign service during the Second World War. One more campaign star, the Arctic Star, and one more clasp, the Bomber Command Clasp, were belatedly added on 26 February 2013, more than sixty-seven years after the end of the war.

Including the Arctic Star and the Bomber Command clasp, no-one could be awarded more than six campaign stars, with five of the ten clasps denoting service that would have qualified for a second star. Only one clasp could be worn on any one campaign star. The maximum of six possible stars are the following:

- The 1939–1945 Star with, when awarded, either the Battle of Britain or the Bomber Command clasp.
- Only one of the Atlantic Star, Air Crew Europe Star or France and Germany Star. Those earning more than one received the first qualified for, with the second denoted by the appropriate ribbon clasp.
- The Arctic Star.
- The Africa Star with, if awarded, the first earned of clasps for North Africa 1942–43, 8th Army or 1st Army.
- Either the Pacific Star or Burma Star. Those earning both received the first qualified for, with the appropriate clasp to represent the second.
- The Italy Star. No clasps were awarded with the Italy Star.

All recipients of campaign stars also received the War Medal.

== Institution ==
After their victory in North Africa, the Allies used their positions in Tunisia and Malta to invade Sicily, a campaign that lasted from 10 July to 17 August 1943. After this swift victory, the Allies pressed on into Italy on 3 September 1943, they also invading Italian-occupied Greece, Yugoslavia, Corsica and Sardinia. The campaign in Italy itself continued until the end of the war in Europe on 8 May 1945.

The Italy Star was instituted by the United Kingdom in May 1945 for award to those who had served in operations during the Italian Campaign, from the capture of Pantelleria on 11 June 1943 to the end of active hostilities in Europe on 8 May 1945.

== Award criteria ==
The eligibility criteria for the award of the Italy Star was different for service at sea, on land and in the air.

=== Service afloat ===
The qualifying sea areas for the award of the Italy Star were the Mediterranean Command, the Aegean, and Albanian and Cretan waters between 11 June 1943 and 8 May 1945 inclusive. Entry into operational service in an operational area in the Mediterranean or in naval operations during the invasion of the South of France counted, on condition that the six months service requirement for the award of the 1939-1945 Star had been completed.

Casual entry into the qualifying sea areas which was not directly connected with actual operations, service in Merchant Navy vessels landing troops or supplies at ports in North Africa, Palestine, Syria and in Cyprus, or service in vessels at ports in Spain, the Balearic Islands and Turkey east of 30° East, were not regarded as qualifying service for the Italy Star.

The award of a gallantry medal or Mention in Dispatches for action while serving in a qualifying area, qualified the recipient for the award of the Italy Star, regardless of service duration. Personnel whose required service period was terminated prematurely by death, disability or wounds due to service were also awarded the Star regardless of service duration.

Certain special conditions applied governing the award to Naval personnel who entered operational service less than six months before the end of the War. Those who entered operational service in the qualifying area on or after 10 November 1944 were awarded the Italy Star but, in such cases, the 1939-1945 Star could not be awarded for service of less than 180 days.

=== Service ashore ===
No prior time qualification was required for service on land, with qualifying service by Army, Naval shore-based and Royal Air Force non-air crew personnel being entry into an operational area as part of the establishment in the following areas, all dates inclusive:

- Aegean from 11 June 1943 to 8 May 1945.
- Corsica from 11 June to 4 October 1943.
- Dodecanese from 11 June 1943 to 8 May 1945.
- Greece from 11 June 1943 to 8 May 1945.
- Italy, including Elba, from 11 June 1943 to 8 May 1945.
- Pantelleria on 11 June 1943.
- Sardinia from 11 June to 19 September 1943.
- Sicily from 11 June to 17 August 1943.
- Yugoslavia from 11 June 1943 to 8 May 1945.

Army personnel who entered Austrian territory during the closing stages of hostilities in Europe were eligible for the Italy Star, and not for the France and Germany Star.

=== Airborne Service ===
Air crew who flew on operations against the enemy in the Mediterranean theatre, or over Europe from bases in the Mediterranean area, required no prior time qualification and qualified by one operational sortie. The Italy Star could not, however, be awarded to air crew based elsewhere than in the Mediterranean area. The qualification for flying personnel posted or employed on air transport or ferrying duties was at least three landings in any of the qualifying areas during the stipulated dates. Army airborne troops who took part in airborne operations in a qualifying army area were also eligible.

Flights to Europe from bases in the Mediterranean area during the period from 11 July 1943 to 8 May 1945 qualified for the Italy Star, not the France and Germany Star.

== Description ==
The set of nine campaign stars was designed by the Royal Mint engravers. The stars all have a ring suspender which passes through an eyelet formed above the uppermost point of the star. They are six–pointed stars, struck in yellow copper zinc alloy to fit into a 44 millimetres diameter circle, with a maximum width of 38 millimetres and 50 millimetres high from the bottom point of the star to the top of the eyelet.

Obverse

The obverse has a central design of the Royal Cypher "GRI VI", surmounted by a crown. A circlet, the top of which is covered by the crown, surrounds the cypher and is inscribed "THE ITALY STAR".

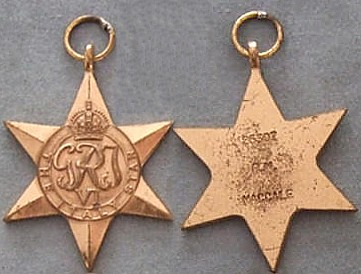
Italy Star awarded to a South African, 25307 R.W. Maccale

Reverse

The reverse is plain.

Naming

The British Honours Committee decided that Second World War campaign medals awarded to British forces would be issued unnamed, a policy applied by all but three British Commonwealth countries. The recipient's details were impressed on the reverse of the stars awarded to Indians, South Africans and, after a campaign led by veteran organisations, to Australians. In the case of Indians, naming consisted of the recipient's force number, rank, initials, surname and service arm or corps, and for South Africans and Australians, of the force number, initials and surname, in block capitals.

Ribbon

The ribbon is 32 millimetres wide, with a 7 millimetres wide red band and a 6 millimetres wide white band, repeated in reverse order and separated by a 6 millimetres wide green band. The colours are those of the Flag of Italy.

The ribbons for this medal and the Defence Medal as well as those of the other Second World War campaign stars, with the exception of the Arctic Star, were devised by King George VI.

== Order of wear ==
The order of wear of the Second World War campaign stars was determined by their respective campaign start dates and by the campaign's duration. This is the order worn, even when a recipient qualified for them in a different order. The Defence Medal and War Medal are worn after the stars. The Canadian Volunteer Service Medal is worn after the Defence Medal and before the War Medal, with other Commonwealth war medals worn after the War Medal.

- The 1939–1945 Star, from 3 September 1939 to 2 September 1945, the full duration of the Second World War.
- The Atlantic Star, from 3 September 1939 to 8 May 1945, the duration of the Battle of the Atlantic and the War in Europe.
- The Arctic Star, from 3 September 1939 to 8 May 1945, the duration of the Arctic Convoys and the War in Europe.
- The Air Crew Europe Star, from 3 September 1939 to 5 June 1944, the period until D-Day minus one.
- The Africa Star, from 10 June 1940 to 12 May 1943, the duration of the North African Campaign.
- The Pacific Star, from 8 December 1941 to 2 September 1945, the duration of the Pacific War.
- The Burma Star, from 11 December 1941 to 2 September 1945, the duration of the Burma Campaign.
- The Italy Star, from 11 June 1943 to 8 May 1945, the duration of the Italian Campaign.
- The France and Germany Star, from 6 June 1944 to 8 May 1945, the duration of the North-West Europe Campaign.
- The Defence Medal, from 3 September 1939 to 8 May 1945 (2 September 1945 for those serving in the Far East and the Pacific), the duration of the Second World War.
- The War Medal, from 3 September 1939 to 2 September 1945, the full duration of the Second World War.

The Italy Star is therefore worn as shown:

Order of Wear
1939–1945 Star	Africa Star	Burma Star	Italy Star	Defence Medal	War Medal

- Preceded by the 1939–1945 Star.
- Preceded by the Africa Star.
- Preceded by the Burma Star.
- Succeeded by the Defence Medal.
- Succeeded by the War Medal.
