= Air Crew Europe Star =

United Kingdom military campaign medal for service in the Second World War

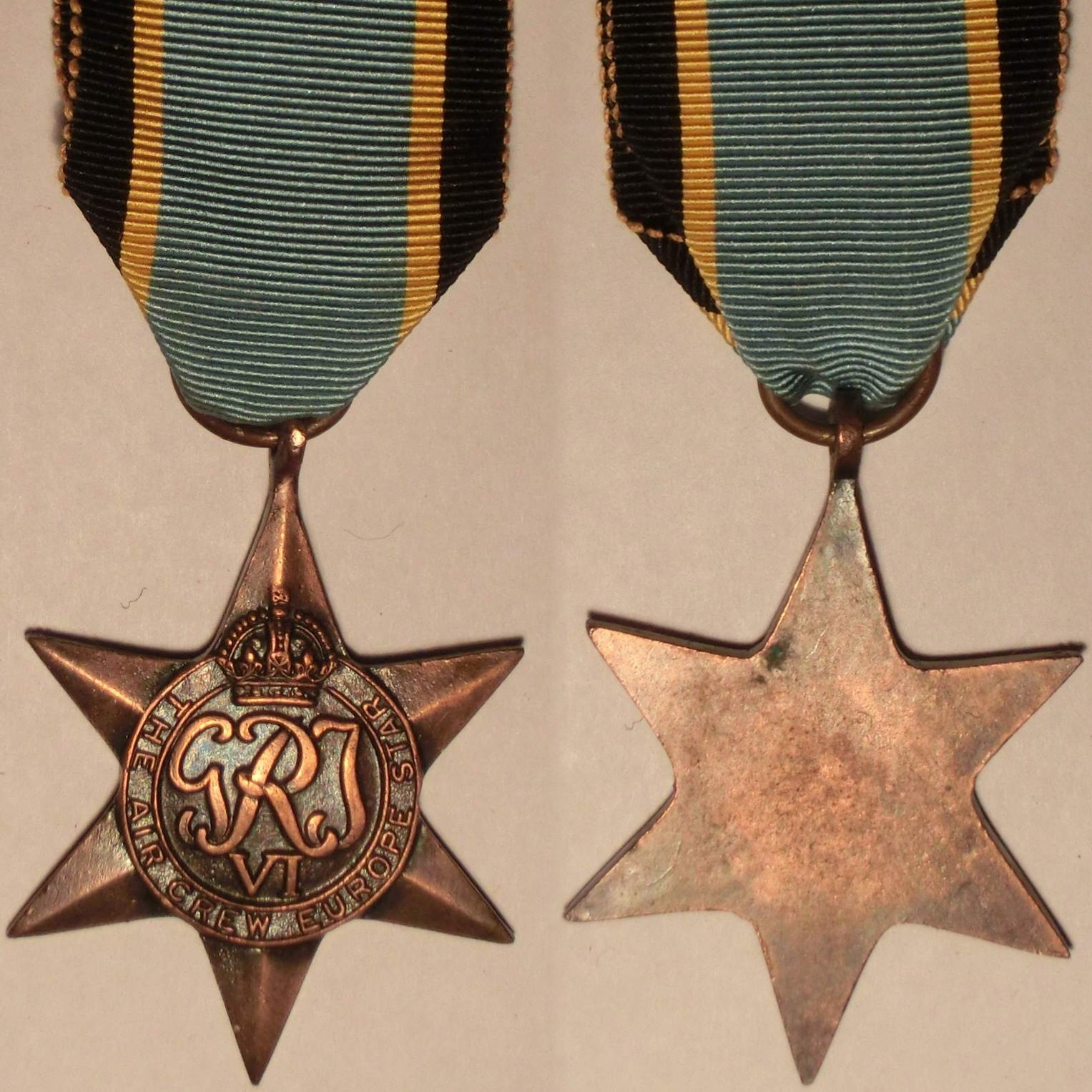
- Obverse and reverse of the medal
- Type: Military campaign medal
- Awarded for: 60 days operational flying
- Country: United Kingdom
- Presented by: the Monarch of the United Kingdom and the Dominions of the British Commonwealth, and Emperor of India
- Eligibility: Pilots and flying crew
- Campaign: European Air Operations 1939–1944
- Clasps: ATLANTIC; FRANCE AND GERMANY
- Established: May 1945
- Ribbon bar without and with rosette

Order of wear
- Next (higher): Arctic Star
- Next (lower): Africa Star
- Related: Atlantic Star; France and Germany Star

The Air Crew Europe Star is a military campaign medal, instituted by the United Kingdom in May 1945 for award to British and Commonwealth air crews who participated in operational flights over Europe from bases in the United Kingdom during the Second World War.

Two clasps were instituted to be worn on the medal ribbon: Atlantic and France and Germany.

== The Second World War Stars ==
On 8 July 1943, the 1939–43 Star (later named the 1939–1945 Star) and the Africa Star became the first two campaign stars instituted, and by May 1945 a total of eight stars and nine clasps had been established to reward campaign service during the Second World War. One more campaign star, the Arctic Star, and one more clasp, the Bomber Command Clasp, were belatedly added on 26 February 2013, more than sixty-seven years after the end of the war.

Including the Arctic Star and the Bomber Command clasp, no-one could be awarded more than six campaign stars, with five of the ten clasps awarded denoting service that would have qualified for a second star. Only one clasp could be worn on any one campaign star. The maximum of six possible stars are the following:

- The 1939–1945 Star with, when awarded, either the Battle of Britain or the Bomber Command clasp.
- Only one of the Atlantic Star, Air Crew Europe Star or France and Germany Star. Those earning more than one received the first qualified for, with the second denoted by the appropriate ribbon clasp.
- The Arctic Star.
- The Africa Star with, if awarded, the first earned of clasps for North Africa 1942–43, 8th Army or 1st Army.
- Either the Pacific Star or Burma Star. Those earning both received the first qualified for, with the appropriate clasp to represent the second.
- The Italy Star.

All recipients of campaign stars also received the War Medal.

Since only the first of the Atlantic Star, Air Crew Europe Star or France and Germany Star to be earned could be awarded to any one individual, the possible Star and Clasp combinations for these three campaign stars are:

- The Atlantic Star with either the Air Crew Europe or France and Germany clasp.
- The Air Crew Europe Star with either the France and Germany or Atlantic clasp.
- The France and Germany Star with the Atlantic clasp.
  As a result of the different date ranges involved, the earlier period Air Crew Europe clasp could not be added to the later period France and Germany Star.

== Institution ==
The strategic bombing campaign against German industrial cities, military installations and a wide variety of other targets continued throughout World War Two and made a decisive contribution to Allied victory. Although the Royal Air Force suffered significant losses of both men and aircraft, the campaign severely curtailed German industrial production.

The Air Crew Europe Star was instituted in May 1945 for award to air crew who flew operations from the United Kingdom over Europe. It was not awarded to supporting ground personnel.

Two clasps were instituted to be worn on the Air Crew Europe Star's ribbon, 'Atlantic' and 'France and Germany'. British uniform regulations stipulated that no one person could be awarded more than one clasp to any one campaign star, and neither the Atlantic Star nor the France and Germany Star could be awarded to a recipient of the Air Crew Europe Star. Subsequent entitlement to either of these stars was denoted by the award of the appropriate clasp to the Air Crew Europe Star, with only the first clasp earned being worn.

== Award criteria ==
=== Broad criteria ===
The Air Crew Europe Star was awarded for operational flying from bases in the United Kingdom over Europe from the outbreak of the Second World War on 3 September 1939 to 5 June 1944, the day before the D-Day Normandy Invasion, both dates inclusive. For air crew of the Royal Air Force, two months of operational flying was required in order to qualify for the award of the Air Crew Europe Star. Army personnel qualified for this star after they had served on air crew duties for four months, provided two months of this minimum four-month period had been operational flying over Europe with at least one operational sortie. The 1939-1945 Star must already have been earned before commencing qualifying service for the Air Crew Europe Star.

From D-Day on 6 June 1944, operational flying over Europe qualified air crew for the award of the France and Germany Star or, for holders of either the Atlantic Star or Air Crew Europe Star, the award of the France and Germany Clasp.

=== Special criteria ===
The award of a gallantry medal or Mention in Dispatches for action during operational flying over Europe, qualified the recipient for the immediate award of the Air Crew Europe Star, regardless of service duration. Personnel whose required qualifying service period was terminated prematurely by their death, disability or wounding due to service, were awarded the Star regardless of service duration.

== Description ==
The set of nine campaign stars was designed by the Royal Mint engravers. The stars all have a ring suspender which passes through an eyelet formed above the uppermost point of the star. They are six–pointed stars, struck in yellow copper zinc alloy to fit into a 44 millimetres diameter circle, with a maximum width of 38 millimetres and 50 millimetres high from the bottom point of the star to the top of the eyelet.

Obverse

The obverse has a central design of the Royal Cypher "GRI VI", surmounted by a crown. A circlet, the top of which is covered by the crown, surrounds the cypher and is inscribed "THE AIR CREW EUROPE STAR".

Reverse

The reverse is plain.

Naming

The British Honours Committee decided that Second World War campaign medals awarded to British forces would be issued unnamed, a policy applied by all but three British Commonwealth countries. The recipient's name was impressed on the reverse of the stars awarded to Indians, South Africans and, after a campaign led by veteran organisations, to Australians. In the case of South Africans, the naming comprised the recipient's force number, initials and surname in block capitals.

Clasps

Both clasps were struck in bronze and have a frame with an inside edge which resembles the perforated edge of a postage stamp. They are inscribed "ATLANTIC" and "FRANCE AND GERMANY" respectively and were designed to be sewn onto the medal's ribbon. Regulations only allow one clasp, the first earned, to be worn with the Star. When the ribbon is worn alone, a silver rosette is worn on the ribbon bar to denote the award of a clasp.

Ribbon

The ribbon is 32 millimetres wide, with a 4 millimetres wide black band and a 3 millimetres wide yellow band, repeated in reverse order and separated by an 18 millimetres wide blue band. The colours and layout symbolise the continuous service of the Royal Air Force by night and day. The sky is represented by the blue centre band and night flying by the black bands on the edges, while the yellow bands represent enemy searchlights.

The ribbons for this medal and the Defence Medal as well as those of the other Second World War campaign stars, with the exception of the Arctic Star, were devised by King George VI.

== Order of wear ==
The order of wear of the Second World War campaign stars was determined by their respective campaign start dates and by the campaign's duration. This is the order worn, even when a recipient qualified for them in a different order. The Defence Medal and War Medal are worn after the stars. The Canadian Volunteer Service Medal is worn after the Defence Medal and before the War Medal, with other Commonwealth war medals worn after the War Medal.

- The 1939–1945 Star, from 3 September 1939 to 2 September 1945, the full duration of the Second World War.
- The Atlantic Star, from 3 September 1939 to 8 May 1945, the duration of the Battle of the Atlantic and the War in Europe.
- The Arctic Star, from 3 September 1939 to 8 May 1945, the duration of the Arctic Convoys and the War in Europe.
- The Air Crew Europe Star, from 3 September 1939 to 5 June 1944, the period until D-Day minus one.
- The Africa Star, from 10 June 1940 to 12 May 1943, the duration of the North African Campaign.
- The Pacific Star, from 8 December 1941 to 2 September 1945, the duration of the Pacific War.
- The Burma Star, from 11 December 1941 to 2 September 1945, the duration of the Burma Campaign.
- The Italy Star, from 11 June 1943 to 8 May 1945, the duration of the Italian Campaign.
- The France and Germany Star, from 6 June 1944 to 8 May 1945, the duration of the North-West Europe Campaign.
- The Defence Medal, from 3 September 1939 to 8 May 1945 (2 September 1945 for those serving in the Far East and the Pacific), the duration of the Second World War.
- The War Medal, from 3 September 1939 to 2 September 1945, the full duration of the Second World War.

The Air Crew Europe Star is therefore worn as shown:

- Preceded by the Arctic Star.
- Succeeded by the Africa Star.
