= Burma Star =

United Kingdom military campaign medal for service in the Second World War

The Burma Star
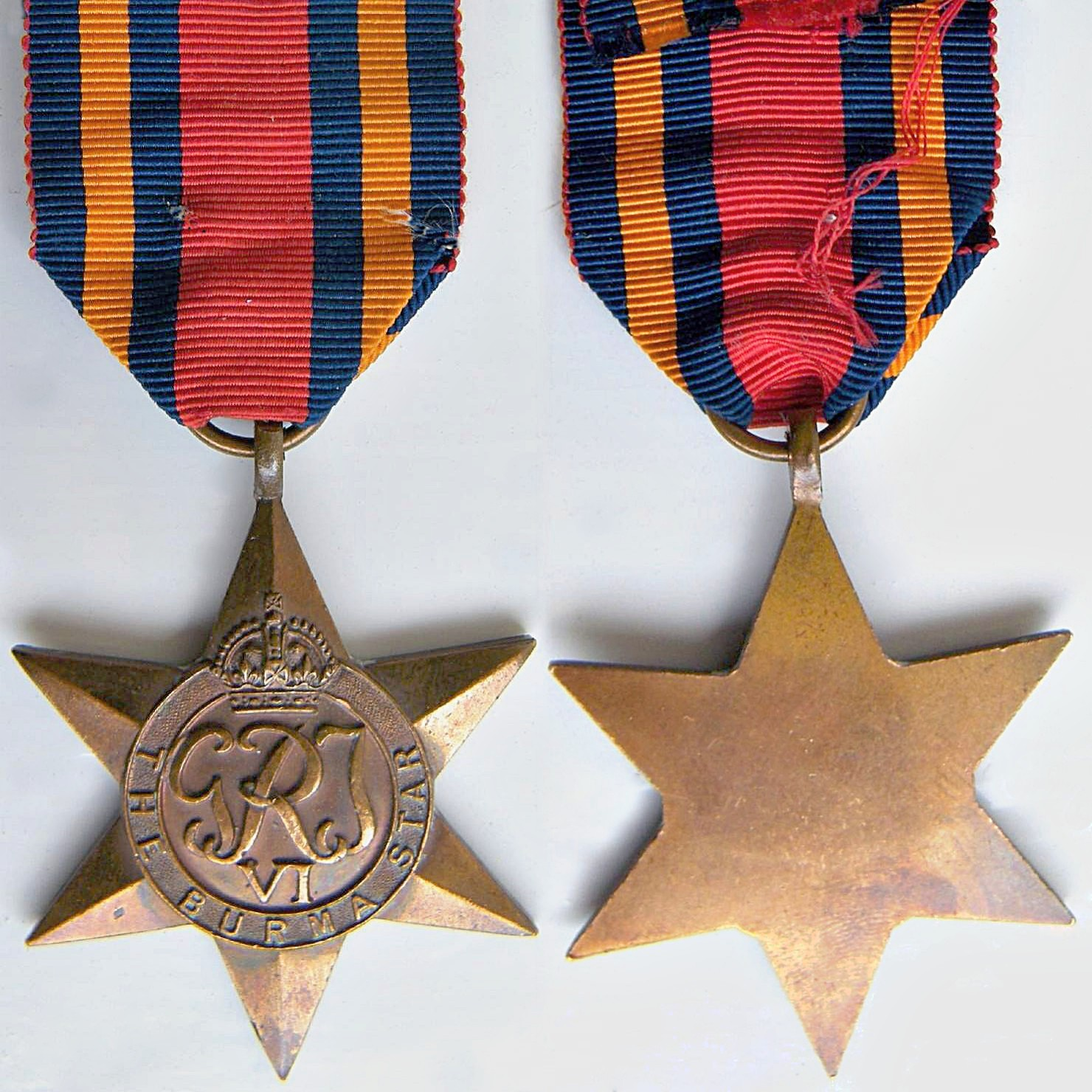
- Type: Military campaign medal
- Awarded for: Service in operational area
- Country: United Kingdom, British India
- Presented by: the Monarch of the United Kingdom and the Dominions of the British Commonwealth, and Emperor of India
- Eligibility: All Ranks
- Campaign: Burma 1941–1945
- Clasps: PACIFIC
- Established: May 1945
- Ribbon bar without and with Pacific Clasp rosette

Order of wear
- Next (higher): Pacific Star
- Next (lower): Italy Star
- Related: Pacific Star

The Burma Star is a military campaign medal, instituted by the United Kingdom in May 1945 for award to British and Commonwealth forces who served in the Burma Campaign from 1941 to 1945, during the Second World War.

One clasp, Pacific, was instituted to be worn on the medal ribbon.

== The Second World War Stars ==
On 8 July 1943, the 1939–43 Star (later named the 1939–1945 Star) and the Africa Star became the first two campaign stars instituted by the United Kingdom, and by May 1945 a total of eight stars and nine clasps had been established to acknowledge campaign service during the Second World War. One more campaign star, the Arctic Star, and one more clasp, the Bomber Command Clasp, were belatedly added on 26 February 2013, more than sixty-seven years after the end of the war.

Including the Arctic Star and the Bomber Command Clasp, no-one could be awarded more than six campaign stars, with five of the ten clasps denoting service that would have qualified for a second star. Only one clasp could be worn on any one campaign star. The maximum of six possible stars is the following:

- The 1939–1945 Star with, when awarded, either the Battle of Britain or the Bomber Command Clasp.
- Only one of the Atlantic Star, Air Crew Europe Star or France and Germany Star. Those earning more than one received the first qualified for, with the second denoted by the appropriate ribbon clasp.
- The Arctic Star.
- The Africa Star with, if awarded, the first earned of clasps for North Africa 1942–43, 8th Army or 1st Army.
- Either the Pacific Star or Burma Star. Those earning both received the first qualified for, with the appropriate clasp to represent the second.
- The Italy Star.

All recipients of campaign stars also received the War Medal.

== Institution ==
The Burma Campaign took place between 11 December 1941 and 2 September 1945, commencing with Japanese forces invading Burma and driving British forces back to the Indian border. Since the Japanese held superiority in the Pacific, the Allies were not in a position to strike back and regain a foothold in Burma until early in 1944. Total surrender of the Japanese came on 2 September 1945.

The Burma Star was instituted by the United Kingdom in May 1945 for award to those who had served in operations in the Burma Campaign from 11 December 1941 to 2 September 1945.

== Award criteria ==
The eligibility criteria for the award of the Burma Star were different for service at sea, on land and in the air.

=== General ===
No recipient could receive both the Burma and the Pacific Stars. A clasp inscribed 'Pacific' was instituted to be worn on the Burma Star's ribbon by those who earned the Burma Star and who subsequently qualified for the Pacific Star.

The award of a gallantry medal or Mention in Dispatches qualified the recipient for the award of the Burma Star, regardless of service duration. Those whose qualifying service period was terminated prematurely by their death or disability due to service were awarded this Star.

The entitlement to wear the Burma Star, or the Burma Clasp on the ribbon of the Pacific Star, enables the recipient to join the Burma Star Association.

=== Service afloat ===
Royal Navy and Merchant Navy personnel qualified through service in an area restricted to the Bay of Bengal and enclosed by a line running from the southernmost point of Ceylon for a distance of 300 miles south, then to a point 300 miles west of the southernmost point of Sumatra and continuing east to the western side of the Sunda Strait, including the Strait of Malacca. The six months service requirement for the award of the 1939-1945 Star had to be completed before service could begin to count towards qualification for the award of the Burma Star.

Certain special conditions applied governing the award of the Burma Star to those Naval personnel who entered operational service less than six months before the end of the War. Those who entered operational service in the qualifying area on or after 7 March 1945 were awarded either the Burma Star or the Pacific Star by entry into operational service, the star awarded being the one appropriate to the last area in which service was rendered. In such cases, however, the 1939-45 Star could not be awarded for service of less than 180 days.

=== Service ashore ===
Army and Navy personnel and Air Force ground crew serving ashore qualified through entry into operational service in Burma between 11 December 1941 and 2 September 1945.

The medal was also awarded for service during certain specified periods in China, Hong Kong, India, Malaya and Sumatra, all dates inclusive:

- Bengal and Assam in India from 1 May 1942 to 31 December 1943.
- Bengal and Assam, east of the Brahmaputra and Dihang Rivers, from 1 January 1941 to 2 September 1945.
- China from 16 February 1942 to 2 September 1945.
- Hong Kong from 26 December 1941 to 2 September 1945.
- Malaya from 16 February 1942 to 2 September 1945.
- Sumatra from 24 March 1942 to 2 September 1945.

Service in China, Hong Kong, Malaya and Sumatra after 8 December 1941, but prior to the start dates listed above, was recognised by the award of the Pacific Star.

=== Airborne service ===
Air crew engaged in operations against the enemy qualified, provided they had already earned the 1939–1945 Star and had completed at least one operational sortie over the appropriate sea or land area. Air crew on transport or ferrying duties qualified by at least three landings in any of the qualifying land areas.

Army troops who took part in airborne operations in a qualifying area for land operations qualified.

== Description ==
The set of nine campaign stars was designed by the Royal Mint engravers. The stars all have a ring suspender which passes through an eyelet formed above the uppermost point of the star. They are six–pointed stars, struck in yellow copper zinc alloy to fit into a 44 millimetres diameter circle, with a maximum width of 38 millimetres and 50 millimetres high from the bottom point of the star to the top of the eyelet.

Obverse

The obverse has a central design of the Royal Cypher "GRI VI", surmounted by a crown. A circlet, the top of which is covered by the crown, surrounds the cypher and is inscribed "THE BURMA STAR".

Reverse

The reverse is plain.

Naming

The British Honours Committee decided that Second World War campaign medals awarded to British forces would be issued unnamed, a policy applied by all but three British Commonwealth countries. The recipient's details were impressed on the reverse of the stars awarded to Indians, South Africans and, after a campaign led by veteran organisations, to Australians. In the case of South Africans and Australians, naming consisted of the recipient's force number, initials and surname in block capitals, with awards to Indians also showing the service arm or corps.

Clasp

The clasp, designed to be sewn onto the medal's ribbon, was struck in yellow copper zinc alloy and has a frame with an inside edge which resembles the perforated edge of a postage stamp. When medals are not worn, a silver rosette is worn on the ribbon bar to denote the award of the clasp.

Ribbon

The ribbon is 32 millimetres wide, with a 3½ millimetre-wide navy blue band, a 4 millimetre-wide dark yellow band and a 3½ millimetre-wide navy blue band, repeated and separated by a 10 millimetre-wide Army red band. The dark blue bands represent British Naval forces, the red band represents the Commonwealth Armies and the dark yellow bands represent the sun.

The ribbons for this medal and the Defence Medal as well as those of the other Second World War campaign stars, with the exception of the Arctic Star, were devised by King George VI.

== Order of wear ==
The order of wear of the Second World War campaign stars was determined by their respective campaign start dates and by the campaign's duration. This is the order worn, even when a recipient qualified for them in a different order. The Defence Medal and War Medal are worn after the stars. The Canadian Volunteer Service Medal is worn after the Defence Medal and before the War Medal, with other Commonwealth war medals worn after the War Medal.

- The 1939–1945 Star, from 3 September 1939 to 2 September 1945, the full duration of the Second World War.
- The Atlantic Star, from 3 September 1939 to 8 May 1945, the duration of the Battle of the Atlantic and the War in Europe.
- The Arctic Star, from 3 September 1939 to 8 May 1945, the duration of the Arctic Convoys and the War in Europe.
- The Air Crew Europe Star, from 3 September 1939 to 5 June 1944, the period until D-Day minus one.
- The Africa Star, from 10 June 1940 to 12 May 1943, the duration of the North African Campaign.
- The Pacific Star, from 8 December 1941 to 2 September 1945, the duration of the Pacific War.
- The Burma Star, from 11 December 1941 to 2 September 1945, the duration of the Burma Campaign.
- The Italy Star, from 11 June 1943 to 8 May 1945, the duration of the Italian Campaign.
- The France and Germany Star, from 6 June 1944 to 8 May 1945, the duration of the North West Europe Campaign.
- The Defence Medal, from 3 September 1939 to 8 May 1945 (2 September 1945 for those serving in the Far East and the Pacific), the duration of the Second World War.
- The War Medal, from 3 September 1939 to 2 September 1945, the full duration of the Second World War.

The Burma Star is therefore worn as shown:

- Preceded by the Pacific Star, but that ribbon could not be awarded together with the Burma Star. As such, on any bar the Burma Star would be preceded by the Africa Star or another medal that was higher in the order of precedence.
- Succeeded by the Italy Star.
