= Arctic Star =

United Kingdom military campaign medal for service in the Second World War

The Arctic Star
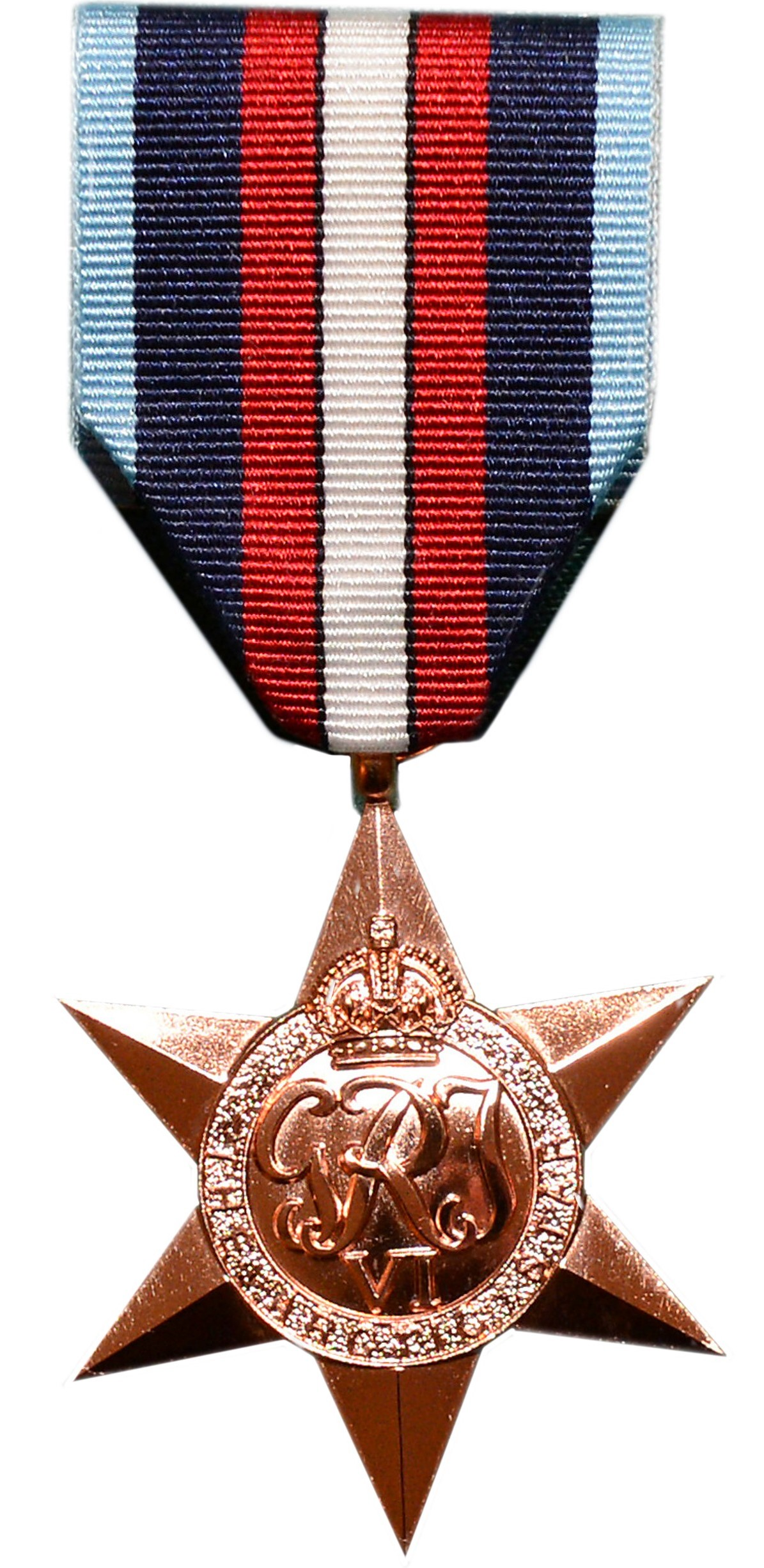
- Arctic Star medal
- Type: Military campaign medal
- Awarded for: Entry into operational area
- Country: United Kingdom
- Presented by: Charles III
- Eligibility: All Ranks
- Campaigns: Battle of the Atlantic, for service north of the Arctic Circle
- Established: 19 December 2012
- First award: 19 March 2013
- Ribbon bar

Order of wear
- Next (higher): Atlantic Star
- Next (lower): Air Crew Europe Star
- Related: Atlantic Star

The Arctic Star is a military campaign medal instituted by the United Kingdom on 19 December 2012 for award to British Commonwealth forces who served on the Arctic Convoys north of the Arctic Circle, during the Second World War.

== The Second World War Stars ==
On 8 July 1943, the 1939–43 Star (later named the 1939–1945 Star) and the Africa Star became the first two campaign stars instituted, and by May 1945 a total of eight stars and nine clasps had been established to reward campaign service during the Second World War. One more campaign star, the Arctic Star, and one more clasp, the Bomber Command Clasp, were belatedly added on 26 February 2013, more than sixty-seven years after the end of the war.

Including the Arctic Star and the Bomber Command clasp, no-one could be awarded more than six campaign stars, with five of the ten clasps denoting service that would have qualified for a second star. Only one clasp could be worn on any one campaign star. The maximum of six possible stars are the following:

- The 1939–1945 Star with, when awarded, either the Battle of Britain or the Bomber Command clasp.
- Only one of the Atlantic Star, Air Crew Europe Star or France and Germany Star. Those earning more than one received the first qualified for, with the second denoted by the appropriate ribbon clasp.
- The Arctic Star.
- The Africa Star with, if awarded, the first earned of clasps for North Africa 1942–43, 8th Army or 1st Army.
- Either the Pacific Star or Burma Star. Those earning both received the first qualified for, with the appropriate clasp to represent the second.
- The Italy Star.

All recipients of campaign stars also received the War Medal.

== Institution ==
The Arctic Star is a retrospective award, announced in late 2012, nearly seven decades after the end of the Second World War. It was formally approved by the Queen for award to those who served on the Arctic Convoys during the Second World War, and production began in early 2013.

The institution of the medal, along with the Bomber Command Clasp, was the result of a 16-year-long campaign by Commander Eddie Grenfell, Lieutenant Commander Dick Dykes and Merchant Navy veteran Jock Dempster, who stressed that service in the arctic convoys north of the Arctic Circle was entirely different from that in the Atlantic, for which the Atlantic Star had been awarded, with different aims and different conditions which had been described by Winston Churchill as "the worst journey in the world".

The Arctic Star has been unusual, since it is the first British medal to be instituted and awarded using a dead monarch's cypher or effigy, and who did not give permission for it to be instituted.

== Award criteria ==
The medal was awarded for any length of operational service north of the Arctic Circle by members of the British Armed Forces and the Merchant Navy. The qualifying area is defined as 66° 32' North Latitude and the qualifying period recognises the particular severity of the conditions experienced by those who served in the Arctic.

The inclusive qualifying period of service is 3 September 1939 to 8 May 1945, the duration of the Second World War in Europe. Though the Arctic Star is intended to recognise the service of personnel in the Arctic convoys of World War II, other members of the military and civilians may also qualify. Eligibility is defined as follows:

- Royal Navy and Merchant Navy personnel must have served anywhere at sea north of the Arctic Circle. This includes, but is not limited exclusively to, those ships which participated in, and in support of convoys to North Russia. Fleet Air Arm personnel who did not qualify by sea service may qualify under the criteria applicable to Royal Air Force personnel.
- Air crew of the Air Forces are eligible if they landed north of the Arctic Circle or served in the air over this area. Non-air crew who performed operational service in the area, for example ground crew or those who sailed with Catapult Aircraft Merchant Ships, are also eligible.
- Army personnel who served on His Majesty's ships or in defensively equipped merchant ships qualify under the rules applying to the Navy or Merchant Navy. Personnel who took part in land operations north of the Arctic Circle are also eligible for award.
- Civilian Members of the few approved categories who qualify for Campaign Stars will be eligible so long as they met any qualifying criteria while they served in support of military operations.
- Foreign nationals who served in British or Dominion Forces, such as the Royal Canadian Navy and Royal Australian Navy, are eligible for the Arctic Star so long as the individuals have not been recognised by a similar award from their own governments.

Eligibility for the Arctic Star does not affect an individual's eligibility for any other previously awarded campaign medals, nor does it automatically entitle individuals to any further awards.

== Description ==
The set of nine campaign stars was designed by the Royal Mint engravers. The stars all have a ring suspender which passes through an eyelet formed above the uppermost point of the star. They are six–pointed stars, struck in yellow copper zinc alloy to fit into a 44 millimetres diameter circle, with a maximum width of 38 millimetres and 50 millimetres high from the bottom point of the star to the top of the eyelet.

Obverse

The obverse has a central design of the George VI Royal Cypher "GRI VI", surmounted by a crown. A circlet, the top of which is covered by the crown, surrounds the cypher and is inscribed "THE ARCTIC STAR".

Reverse

The reverse is plain.

Naming

The medal was awarded unnamed, although some recipients chose to have their medals privately engraved.

Ribbon

The ribbon is 32 millimetres wide, with a 3½ millimetres wide Air Force blue band, a 6 millimetres wide Navy blue band, a 4 millimetres wide red band and a ¼ millimetre wide black pinstripe band, repeated in reverse order and separated by a 4½ millimetres wide white band. The three colours represent the forces which were involved in the campaign, light blue for the Air Forces, dark blue for the Navy and red for the Merchant Navy, while the central white band, edged in black, represents the Arctic.

The design was submitted by the Ministry of Defence to the Royal Mint Advisory Committee. Their recommendation was submitted to the Queen for approval.

== Recipients ==
The first Arctic Stars were presented to forty World War Two veterans on 19 March 2013, in London. As many as 120,000 veterans or their next-of-kin are believed to be eligible for the Arctic Star. As at 19 July 2018, the Ministry of Defence had issued 18,637 Arctic Star medals to eligible veterans on a self-nomination basis.

On 28 September 2014, Håkon Nilsen, who served as torpedo commander on HNoMS Stord and took part in 20 Arctic convoys as well as the Normandy landings, was the first and only Norwegian war veteran to be awarded the Arctic Star posthumously.

== Order of wear ==
The order of wear of the Second World War campaign stars was determined by their respective campaign start dates and by the campaign's duration. This is the order worn, even when a recipient qualified for them in a different order. The Defence Medal and War Medal are worn after the stars. The Canadian Volunteer Service Medal is worn after the Defence Medal and before the War Medal, with other Commonwealth war medals worn after the War Medal.

- The 1939–1945 Star, from 3 September 1939 to 2 September 1945, the full duration of the Second World War.
- The Atlantic Star from 3 September 1939 to 8 May 1945, the duration of the Battle of the Atlantic and the War in Europe.
- The Arctic Star, from 3 September 1939 to 8 May 1945, the duration of the Arctic Convoys and the War in Europe.
- The Air Crew Europe Star, from 3 September 1939 to 5 June 1944, the period until D-Day minus one.
- The Africa Star, from 10 June 1940 to 12 May 1943, the duration of the North African Campaign.
- The Pacific Star, from 8 December 1941 to 2 September 1945, the duration of the Pacific War.
- The Burma Star, from 11 December 1941 to 2 September 1945, the duration of the Burma Campaign.
- The Italy Star, from 11 June 1943 to 8 May 1945, the duration of the Italian Campaign.
- The France and Germany Star, from 6 June 1944 to 8 May 1945, the duration of the North West Europe Campaign.
- The Defence Medal, from 3 September 1939 to 8 May 1945 (2 September 1945 for those serving in the Far East and the Pacific), the duration of the Second World War.
- The War Medal, from 3 September 1939 to 2 September 1945, the full duration of the Second World War.

The Arctic Star is therefore worn as shown:

- Preceded by the Atlantic Star.
- Succeeded by the Air Crew Europe Star.

=== South Africa ===
On 6 April 1952 the Union of South Africa instituted its own range of military decorations and medals. These new awards were worn before all earlier British decorations and medals awarded to South Africans, with the exception of the Victoria Cross, which still took precedence before all other awards. Second World War medals awarded to South Africans continued to be worn in the order shown above, with the Africa Service Medal worn after the War Medal. Although instituted after 1952, the Arctic Star was a retrospective award, therefore its position in the South African order of wear followed the above order.
