= War Medal (Norway) =

Norwegian award

Krigsmedaljen
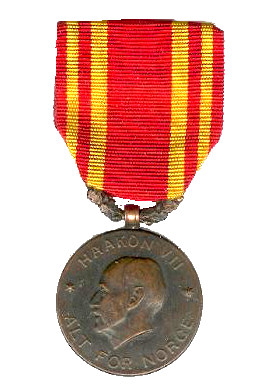
- Awarded for: Participating in a meritorious way in the Second World War, or for meritous service during any war, for Norway
- Presented by: Norway
- Eligibility: Norwegian and foreign members of the military
- Clasps: If the medal is earned more than once up to three stars may be attached to the ribbon.
- Status: Still awarded
- Established: 23 May 1941
- Norwegian War Medal ribbon

Precedence
- Next (higher): St. Olav's Medal with Oak Branch
- Next (lower): Armed Forces Medal for Heroic Deeds

The War Medal (Norwegian: Krigsmedaljen) is a Norwegian war decoration for service during Second World War, and later for meritous service during war.

== Criteria ==
The Norwegian War Medal was instituted by King Haakon VII of Norway by Royal Decree on 23 May 1941 with the addition of the Royal Decree of 13 November 1942. It may be awarded to Norwegian and foreign members of the military who in a meritorious way have participated in the Second World War for Norway. The War Medal may also awarded posthumously to all Norwegians and foreigners who fought in the Norwegian forces and merchant marine and fell for the Norwegian Resistance.

The distribution ceased in 1951, but in 1979 it was determined by Royal decree that this medal was to be awarded Norwegian and foreign seamen who served on Norwegian Shipping and Trade Mission (Nortraship) vessels during World War II for 18 months, or on board Royal Norwegian Navy vessels.

The criteria were again changed in 2012. The medal can be awarded to Norwegians who have served meritously during war, for Norway. It has been awarded for war against ISIL.

== Appearance ==
The obverse side of the medal features the portrait of King Haakon VII of Norway, his name and motto Alt for Norge. The reverse features a wreath, the inscription Krigsmedalje and the king's monogram. The medal is in bronze and the ribbon is in the colours of the Royal Standard: red and yellow. If a recipient earns the medal more than once, up to three stars may be attached to the ribbon. Along with the medal comes with a certificate, signed by the king. The medal was first produced at the firm Spink & Son in London.

== Recipients ==
- Arne Austeen
- Johan Beichmann
- Svein Blindheim
- Johannes Brun (officer)
- Raymond Couraud
- Marius Eriksen Jr.
- Erik Gjems-Onstad
- Sverre Granlund
- Gunnar Halle (officer)
- Nils Uhlin Hansen
- Sverre Haug
- Rolf Hauge (army officer)
- Kasper Idland
- Margit Johnsen
- Dagfinn Kjeholt
- Erik Sture Larre
- Leif Larsen
- Hakon Lunde
- Helge Mehre
- Fredrik Meyer
- Edward Evans, 1st Baron Mountevans
- Hugo Munthe-Kaas
- Håkon Nilsen
- Olav V of Norway
- Oluf Reed-Olsen
- Boy Rist
- Gerard Broadmead Roope
- Annæus Schjødt Jr.
- Inge Steensland
- Skule Storheill
- Anne Margrethe Strømsheim
- Edvard Tallaksen
- Leif Tronstad
- Ernst Ullring
- Leif Utne
- Sigurd Valvatne
- War Medal (Norway)
- Erling Welle-Strand
- Dick Zeiner-Henriksen

== See also ==
- Orders, decorations, and medals of Norway
