= France and Germany Star =

United Kingdom military campaign medal for service in the Second World War

The France and Germany Star
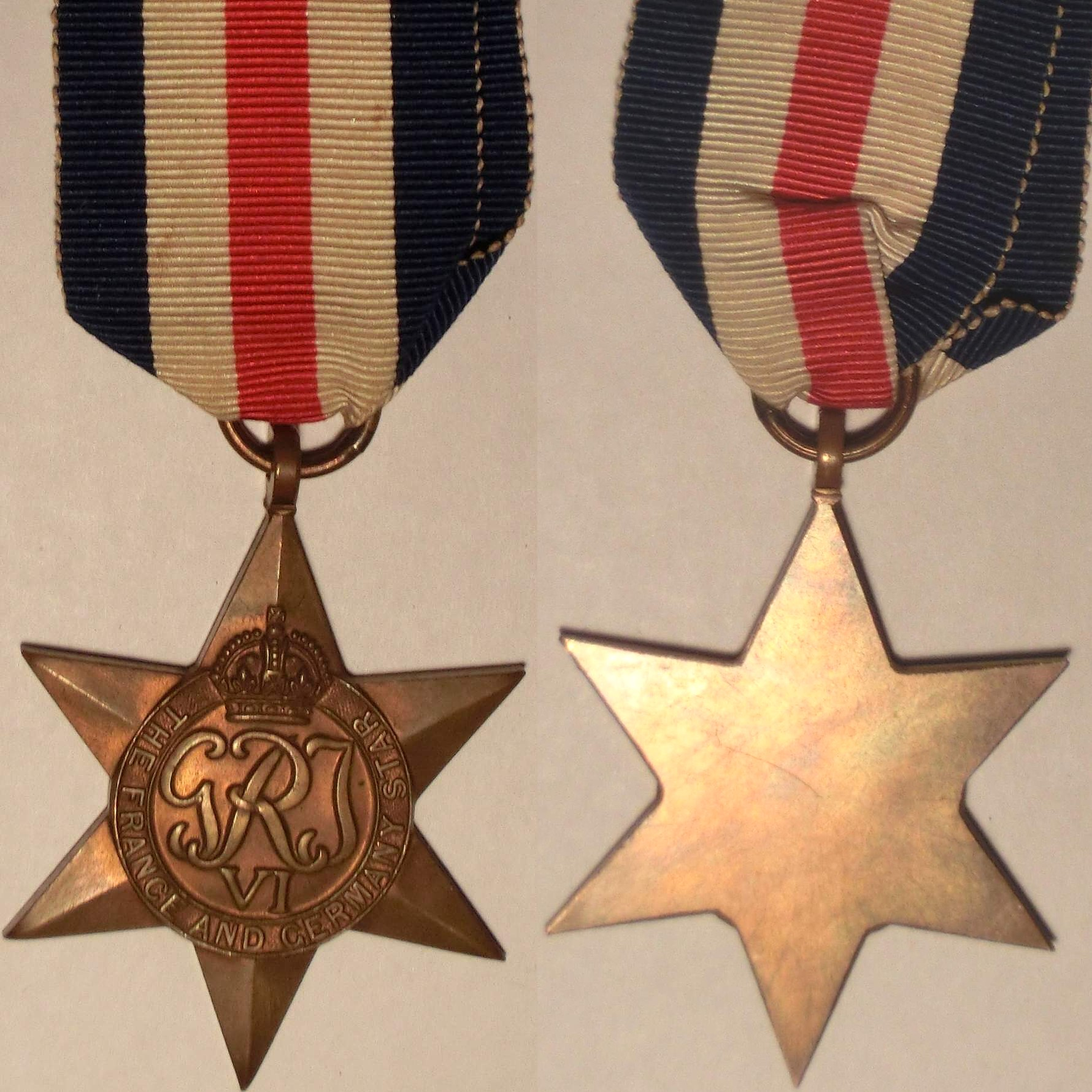
- Type: Military campaign medal
- Awarded for: Entry into operational service
- Country: United Kingdom
- Presented by: the Monarch of the United Kingdom and the Dominions of the British Commonwealth, and Emperor of India
- Eligibility: All Ranks
- Campaign: North West Europe 1944-1945
- Clasps: ATLANTIC
- Established: May 1945
- Ribbon bar without and with rosette

Order of wear
- Next (higher): Italy Star
- Next (lower): Defence Medal
- Related: Atlantic Star

The France and Germany Star is a military campaign medal, instituted by the United Kingdom in May 1945 for award to British Commonwealth forces who served in France, Belgium, Luxembourg, the Netherlands or Germany and adjacent sea areas between 6 June 1944 and 8 May 1945, during the Second World War.

One clasp, 'Atlantic', could be worn on the medal ribbon.

== The Second World War Stars ==
On 8 July 1943, the 1939–43 Star (later named the 1939–1945 Star) and the Africa Star became the first two campaign stars instituted, and by May 1945 a total of eight stars and nine clasps had been established to reward campaign service during the Second World War. One more campaign star, the Arctic Star, and one more clasp, the Bomber Command Clasp, were belatedly added on 26 February 2013, more than sixty-seven years after the end of the war.

Including the Arctic Star and the Bomber Command clasp, no-one could be awarded more than six campaign stars, with five of the ten clasps denoting service that would have qualified for a second star. Only one clasp could be worn on any one campaign star. The maximum of six possible stars are the following:

- The 1939–1945 Star with, when awarded, either the Battle of Britain or the Bomber Command clasp.
- Only one of the Atlantic Star, Air Crew Europe Star or France and Germany Star. Those earning more than one received the first qualified for, with the second denoted by the appropriate ribbon clasp.
- The Arctic Star.
- The Africa Star with, if awarded, the first earned of clasps for North Africa 1942–43, 8th Army or 1st Army.
- Either the Pacific Star or Burma Star. Those earning both received the first qualified for, with the appropriate clasp to represent the second.
- The Italy Star.

All recipients of campaign stars also received the War Medal.

Since only the first of the Atlantic Star, Air Crew Europe Star or France and Germany Star to be earned could be awarded to any one individual, the possible Star and Clasp combinations for these three campaign stars are:

- The Atlantic Star with either the Air Crew Europe or France and Germany clasp.
- The Air Crew Europe Star with either the France and Germany or Atlantic clasp.
- The France and Germany Star with the Atlantic clasp.
  As a result of the different date ranges involved, the earlier period Air Crew Europe clasp could not be added to the later period France and Germany Star.

== Institution ==
The Allies launched their campaign in North West Europe on 'D-Day', 6 June 1944, when British, American and Canadian forces landed on the beaches of Northern France. Over the following eleven months, these forces advanced across Western Europe while the Russians advanced towards Berlin from the East, Germany finally surrendering on 8 May 1945.

The France and Germany Star was instituted by the United Kingdom in May 1945, for award to those who had served in operations on land or in the air in France, Belgium, Luxembourg, Holland or Germany from 6 June 1944 until the end of active hostilities in Europe on 8 May 1945, as well as for Naval and Merchant Navy service directly in support of these land operations.

== Award criteria ==
The France and Germany Star was awarded for entry into operational service in France, Belgium, Luxembourg, Holland and Germany between 6 June 1944 and 8 May 1945, both dates inclusive. The qualifying sea area was south of a line from the Firth of Forth to Kristiansand (South) in the North Sea, east of longitude 6° West in the Bay of Biscay, and in the English Channel, provided such service was directly in support of land operations in France, Belgium, Luxembourg, Holland or Germany.

Air crew who flew on operations against the enemy over Europe on or after 6 June 1944 qualified by one operational sortie. The qualification for flying personnel posted or employed on air transport or ferrying duties from bases in the United Kingdom was at least three landings in Europe.

Sorties flown from the Mediterranean did not qualify for the award of the France and Germany Star. Similarly, Army personnel who entered Austrian territory during the closing stages of hostilities in Europe, and Naval and Merchant Navy service afloat in the Mediterranean in support of operations in the South of France, did not qualify for this award. All these qualified for the award of the Italy Star.

No South African Army or Air Force unit served in North West Europe during the war, with the frigate HMSAS Good Hope the only South African Naval vessel whose crew qualified for the Star. Including those seconded to British units, a total of 657 South African Forces personnel received the France and Germany Star or clasp, excluding South African citizens who enlisted directly into British and other Allied armed services.

The France and Germany Star was not awarded in addition to the Atlantic Star or the Air Crew Europe Star. Personnel who qualified for the award of two or all three of these stars, were awarded only that star for which they first qualified and a clasp in respect of the first earned of the other two stars. Since the Air Crew Europe Star could not be earned for service after 5 June 1944, only the Atlantic clasp could be awarded with the France and Germany Star.

== Description ==
The set of nine campaign stars was designed by the Royal Mint engravers. The stars all have a ring suspender which passes through an eyelet formed above the uppermost point of the star. They are six–pointed stars, struck in yellow copper zinc alloy to fit into a 44 millimetres diameter circle, with a maximum width of 38 millimetres and 50 millimetres high from the bottom point of the star to the top of the eyelet.

Obverse

The obverse has a central design of the Royal Cypher "GRI VI", surmounted by a crown. A circlet, the top of which is covered by the crown, surrounds the cypher and is inscribed "THE FRANCE AND GERMANY STAR".

Reverse

The reverse is plain.

Naming

The British Honours Committee decided that Second World War campaign medals awarded to British forces would be issued unnamed, a policy applied by all but three British Commonwealth countries. The recipient's details were impressed on the reverse of the stars awarded to Indians, South Africans and, after a campaign led by veteran organisations, to Australians. In the case of Indians, naming consisted of the recipient's force number, rank, initials, surname and service arm or corps, and for South Africans and Australians, of the force number, initials and surname, in block capitals.

Clasp

Atlantic Clasp

The clasp was struck in yellow copper zinc alloy and has a frame with an inside edge which resembles the perforated edge of a postage stamp. It is inscribed "ATLANTIC" and was designed to be sewn onto the medal's ribbon. When the ribbon is worn alone, a silver rosette is worn on the ribbon bar to denote the award of the clasp.

Ribbon

The ribbon is 32 millimetres wide, with equal width dark blue, white, red, white and dark blue bands. The colours are those of the Union flag and also the national colours of France and the Netherlands.

The ribbons for this medal and the Defence Medal as well as those of the other Second World War campaign stars, with the exception of the Arctic Star, were devised by King George VI.

== Order of wear ==
The order of wear of the Second World War campaign stars was determined by their respective campaign start dates and by the campaign's duration. This is the order worn, even when a recipient qualified for them in a different order. The Defence Medal and War Medal are worn after the stars. The Canadian Volunteer Service Medal is worn after the Defence Medal and before the War Medal, with other Commonwealth war medals worn after the War Medal.

- The 1939–1945 Star, from 3 September 1939 to 2 September 1945, the full duration of the Second World War.
- The Atlantic Star, from 3 September 1939 to 8 May 1945, the duration of the Battle of the Atlantic and the War in Europe.
- The Arctic Star, from 3 September 1939 to 8 May 1945, the duration of the Arctic Convoys and the War in Europe.
- The Air Crew Europe Star, from 3 September 1939 to 5 June 1944, the period until D-Day minus one.
- The Africa Star, from 10 June 1940 to 12 May 1943, the duration of the North African Campaign.
- The Pacific Star, from 8 December 1941 to 2 September 1945, the duration of the Pacific War.
- The Burma Star, from 11 December 1941 to 2 September 1945, the duration of the Burma Campaign.
- The Italy Star, from 11 June 1943 to 8 May 1945, the duration of the Italian Campaign.
- The France and Germany Star, from 6 June 1944 to 8 May 1945, the duration of the North West Europe Campaign.
- The Defence Medal, from 3 September 1939 to 8 May 1945 (2 September 1945 for those serving in the Far East and the Pacific), the duration of the Second World War.
- The War Medal, from 3 September 1939 to 2 September 1945, the full duration of the Second World War.

The France and Germany Star is therefore worn as shown:

- Preceded by the Italy Star.
- Succeeded by the Defence Medal.
