= Atlantic Star =

United Kingdom military campaign medal for service in the Second World War

The Atlantic Star
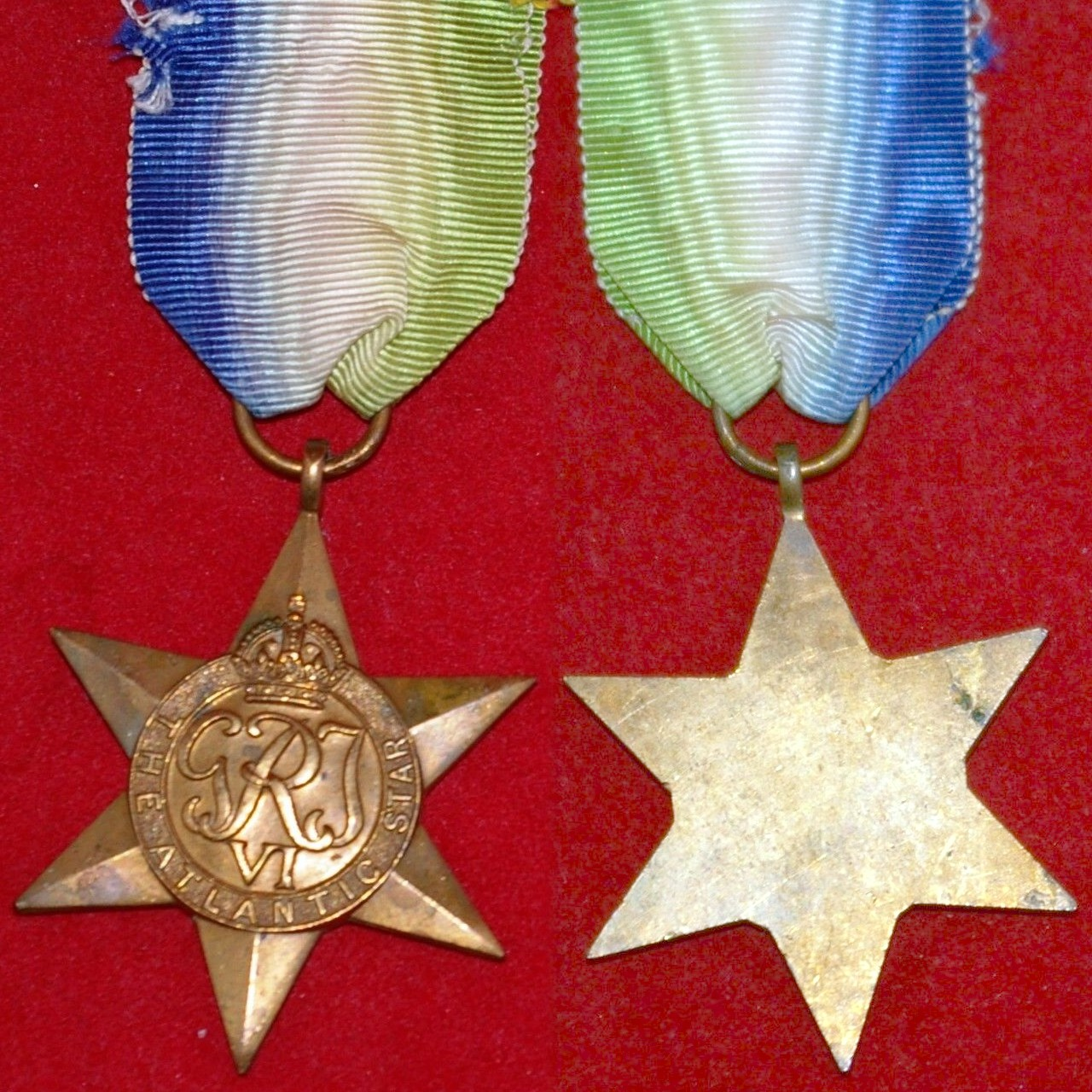
- Type: Military campaign medal
- Awarded for: 180 days operational service afloat or 60 days of operational flying
- Country: United Kingdom
- Presented by: the Monarch of the United Kingdom and the Dominions of the British Commonwealth, and Emperor of India
- Eligibility: All Ranks
- Campaign: Battle of the Atlantic
- Clasps: AIR CREW EUROPE; FRANCE AND GERMANY
- Established: May 1945
- Ribbon bar without and with rosette

Order of wear
- Next (higher): 1939–1945 Star
- Next (lower): Arctic Star
- Related: Arctic Star; Air Crew Europe Star; France and Germany Star

The Atlantic Star is a military campaign medal, instituted by the United Kingdom in May 1945 for award to British Commonwealth forces who took part in the Battle of the Atlantic, the longest continuous campaign of the Second World War.

Two clasps were instituted and could be worn on the medal ribbon, Air Crew Europe and France and Germany.

== The Second World War Stars ==
On 8 July 1943, the 1939–43 Star (later named the 1939–1945 Star) and the Africa Star became the first two campaign stars instituted by the United Kingdom, and by May 1945 a total of eight stars and nine clasps had been established to reward campaign service during the Second World War. One more campaign star, the Arctic Star, and one more clasp, the Bomber Command Clasp, were belatedly added on 26 February 2013, more than sixty-seven years after the end of the war.

Including the Arctic Star and the Bomber Command clasp, no-one could be awarded more than six campaign stars, with five of the ten clasps denoting service that would have qualified for a second star. Only one clasp could be worn on any one campaign star. The maximum of six possible stars are the following:

- The 1939–1945 Star with, when awarded, either the Battle of Britain or the Bomber Command clasp.
- Only one of the Atlantic Star, Air Crew Europe Star or France and Germany Star. Those earning more than one received the first qualified for, with the second denoted by the appropriate ribbon clasp.
- The Arctic Star.
- The Africa Star with, if awarded, the first earned of clasps for North Africa 1942–43, 8th Army or 1st Army.
- Either the Pacific Star or Burma Star. Those earning both received the first qualified for, with the appropriate clasp to represent the second.
- The Italy Star.

All recipients of campaign stars also received the War Medal.

Since only the first of the Atlantic Star, Air Crew Europe Star and France and Germany Star to be earned could be awarded to any one individual, the possible Star and Clasp combinations for these three campaign stars are:

- The Atlantic Star with either the Air Crew Europe Clasp or the France and Germany Clasp.
- The Air Crew Europe Star with either the France and Germany Clasp or the Atlantic Clasp.
- The France and Germany Star with the Atlantic Clasp. As a result of the different date ranges involved, the earlier period Air Crew Europe Clasp could not be added to the later period France and Germany Star.

== Institution ==
The Battle of the Atlantic took place between 3 September 1939 and 8 May 1945, as German U-boats attacked convoys transporting vital supplies from America and the Colonies to Britain. Warships of the Royal Navy and aircraft of the Royal Air Force escorted these convoys, hunted the U-boats and, despite some notable successes by the U-boats, eventually won a comprehensive victory in the Atlantic.

The Atlantic Star was instituted in May 1945 to honour those who took part in the Battle of the Atlantic and was intended primarily for award to those who served in shipping convoys and their escorts and anti-submarine forces, as well as to those who served on fast merchant ships which sailed alone.

Two clasps were instituted to be worn on the Atlantic Star's ribbon, 'Air Crew Europe' and 'France and Germany'. British uniform regulations stipulated that no one person could be awarded more than one clasp to any one campaign star, and as neither the Air Crew Europe Star nor the France and Germany Star could be awarded to a recipient of the Atlantic Star, any subsequent entitlement to either of these two stars was denoted by the appropriate clasp to the Atlantic Star, with only the first clasp earned being worn.

== Award criteria ==
=== Broad criteria ===
The qualifying areas for the award of the Atlantic Star were the Atlantic and Home Waters excluding the Mediterranean, the south Atlantic between the longitude of Cape Horn and longitude 20° East (South Africa), and the convoy routes to ports in North Russia.

The Atlantic Star was awarded for six months service afloat in the Atlantic or in Home Waters within the period from 3 September 1939 to 8 May 1945. It was also awarded to air crew who had taken part in operations against the enemy at sea within the qualifying areas, subject to having served for two months in an operational unit. The 1939–1945 Star must have already been earned by six months service, or two months for air crew, before commencing qualifying service for the Atlantic Star.

Merchant seaman also qualified for the award of the medal, also on condition that the 1939–1945 Star must have already been earned. They were required to have served in the Atlantic, Home Waters, North Russia Convoys or the south Atlantic.

=== Special criteria ===
The award of a gallantry medal or Mention in Dispatches for action while serving in the qualifying areas, qualified the recipient for the award of the Atlantic Star, regardless of service duration. Personnel whose required service period was terminated prematurely by death, disability or wounds due to service were also awarded the Star regardless of service duration.

Certain special conditions applied governing the award to those Naval personnel who entered operational service less than six months before the end of the War, with them receiving for the Atlantic Star provided this was their last operational theatre of the war.

== Description ==
The set of nine campaign stars was designed by the Royal Mint engravers. The stars all have a ring suspender which passes through an eyelet formed above the uppermost point of the star. They are six–pointed stars, struck in yellow copper zinc alloy to fit into a 44 millimetres diameter circle, with a maximum width of 38 millimetres and 50 millimetres high from the bottom point of the star to the top of the eyelet.

Obverse

The obverse has a central design of the Royal Cypher "GRI VI", surmounted by a crown. A circlet, the top of which is covered by the crown, surrounds the cypher and is inscribed "THE ATLANTIC STAR".

Reverse

The reverse is plain.

Naming

The British Honours Committee decided that Second World War campaign medals awarded to British forces would be issued unnamed, a policy applied by all but three British Commonwealth countries. The recipient's details were impressed on the reverse of the stars awarded to Indians, South Africans and, after a campaign led by veteran organisations, to Australians. In the case of South Africans and Australians, the recipient's force number, initials and surname in block capitals.

Clasps

Both clasps were struck in bronze and have a frame with an inside edge which resembles the perforated edge of a postage stamp. They are inscribed "AIR CREW EUROPE" and "FRANCE AND GERMANY" respectively and were designed to be sewn onto the medal's ribbon. Regulations only allow one clasp, the first earned, to be worn with the Star. When the ribbon is worn alone, a silver rosette is worn on the ribbon bar to denote the award of a clasp.

Ribbon

The ribbon is 32 millimetres wide, with shaded and watered bands of blue, white and sea-green, with the colours representing the colours of the Atlantic Ocean. The ribbons for this medal and the Defence Medal as well as those of the other Second World War campaign stars, with the exception of the Arctic Star, were devised by King George VI.

== Order of wear ==
The order of wear of the Second World War campaign stars was determined by their respective campaign start dates and by the campaign's duration. This is the order worn, even when a recipient qualified for them in a different order. The Defence Medal and War Medal are worn after the stars. The Canadian Volunteer Service Medal is worn after the Defence Medal and before the War Medal, with other Commonwealth war medals worn after the War Medal.

- The 1939–1945 Star, from 3 September 1939 to 2 September 1945, the full duration of the Second World War.
- The Atlantic Star from 3 September 1939 to 8 May 1945, the duration of the Battle of the Atlantic and the War in Europe.
- The Arctic Star, from 3 September 1939 to 8 May 1945, the duration of the Arctic Convoys and the War in Europe.
- The Air Crew Europe Star, from 3 September 1939 to 5 June 1944, the period until D-Day minus one.
- The Africa Star, from 10 June 1940 to 12 May 1943, the duration of the North African Campaign.
- The Pacific Star, from 8 December 1941 to 2 September 1945, the duration of the Pacific War.
- The Burma Star, from 11 December 1941 to 2 September 1945, the duration of the Burma Campaign.
- The Italy Star, from 11 June 1943 to 8 May 1945, the duration of the Italian Campaign.
- The France and Germany Star, from 6 June 1944 to 8 May 1945, the duration of the Northwest Europe Campaign.
- The Defence Medal, from 3 September 1939 to 8 May 1945 (2 September 1945 for those serving in the Far East and the Pacific), the duration of the Second World War.
- The War Medal, from 3 September 1939 to 2 September 1945, the full duration of the Second World War.

The Atlantic Star is therefore worn as shown:

- Preceded by the 1939–1945 Star.
- Succeeded by the Arctic Star.
