= Haakon VII 70th Anniversary Medal =

Norwegian military decoration

Haakon VII 70th Anniversary Medal Haakon VIIs 70-årsmedalje
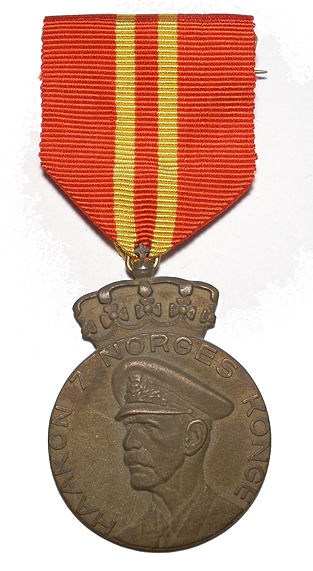
- Type: Commemorative medal
- Awarded for: Military personnel who served in the Norwegian armed forces in Britain on the King's 70th birthday
- Presented by: Norway
- Established: 27 October 1942
- Ribbon bar of the medal

Precedence
- Next (higher): Haakon VII Jubilee Medal 1905–1955
- Next (lower): Haakon VII Centenary Medal

Haakon VII 70th Anniversary Medal is a Norwegian military award, which was instituted by King Haakon VII of Norway on 27 October 1942. It was awarded in recognition of military personnel who served in the Norwegian armed forces in Britain on the 70th birthday of Norwegian King Haakon VII. The medal ranks 33rd in the Norwegian decoration order of precedence.

== Description ==
The medal is circular and 32 millimetres (1.3 in) in diameter. The obverse depicts the effigy of the king in a military uniform, surrounded by the inscription HAAKON 7 NORGES KONGE. The reverse bears the inscription TIL MINNE OM 70-ÅRSDAGEN 3 AUGUST 1942, surrounded by a decorative pattern around the medal's edge. The medal is surmounted by a crown which suspends it from a red ribbon with two central yellow stripes.
