= Defence Medal 1940–1945 =

Norwegian civil and military medal

Defence Medal 1940–1945 Deltagermedaljen
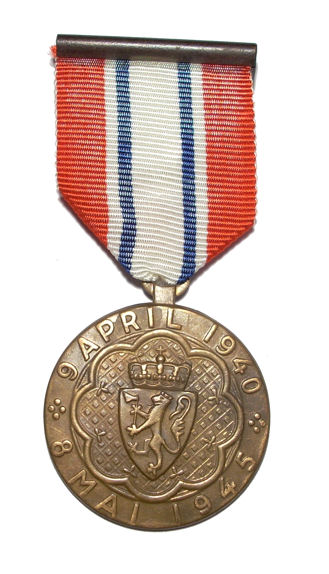
- Type: War medal
- Awarded for: Participation in the defence of Norway 1940-1945
- Presented by: Norway
- Eligibility: Military personnel and merchant sailors
- Status: May still be awarded
- Established: 19 September 1945
- Ribbon bar of the medal

Precedence
- Next (higher): King's Medal of Merit in Silver
- Next (lower): H. M. The Kings Medal of Merit for Service in the Home Guard

The Defence Medal 1940–1945 (Norwegian: Deltagermedaljen 9. april 1940 - 8. mai 1945/Deltakarmedaljen 9. april 1940 - 8. mai 1945) is the award rewarded to those military and civilian personnel who participated in the fight against the German invasion and occupation of Norway between 1940 and 1945.

The Defence Medal 1940–1945 can be awarded both to Norwegian and foreign citizens. The medal may still be awarded due to the large number of participants in the defence of Norway during World War II and the difficulties tracking down all eligible recipients.

The medal is in bronze. On the obverse is the coat of arms with the inscription 9 April 1940 - 8 Mai 1945. On the reverse is the royal flag, the flag and national flag. Above these a narrow circle with the inscription DELTAGER I KAMPEN (Participant in the struggle). The image is surrounded by a chain. The band is in the Norwegian national colors. The band can be fitted with a rosette if the recipient has distinguished himself several times. The medal is made by the goldsmith firm of J. Tostrup in Oslo.

As of 2017, the Defence Medal 1940–1945 ranks as 23rd of the Norwegian decorations.

== Qualification details ==
The medal was awarded to those meeting one of the following criteria:

- Taking part in the campaign in Norway in 1940 for five days or more.
- Service in the Norwegian armed forces and merchant fleet outside of Norway for four months or more (awarded for less than four months service if one served in units that moved to Norway as part of the liberation).
- Taking part in the campaign in Finnmark (winter 1944-45) for one month or more.
- Allied soldiers who took part in the liberation of Norway and served for one month or more.
- Service in the resistance forces for four months or more.
