= Grange =

Grange may refer to:

== Buildings ==
- Grange House, Scotland, built in 1564, and demolished in 1906
- Grange Estate, Pennsylvania, built in 1682
- The Grange (Toronto), Toronto, Ontario, built in 1817
- Monastic grange, a farming estate belonging to a monastery

== Geography ==
=== Australia ===
- Grange, South Australia, a suburb of Adelaide
- Grange, Queensland, a suburb of Brisbane

=== Ireland ===
==== County Westmeath ====
- Grange, Kilbixy, a townland in Kilbixy civil parish, barony of Moygoish
- Grange, Kilcumreragh, a townland in Kilcumreragh civil parish, barony of Moycashel
- Grange, Lackan, a townland in Lackan civil parish, barony of Corkaree

==== Other counties ====
- Grange, either of two townlands in County Laois, in the baronies of Ballyadams and Tinnahinch
- Grange, Cork, a residential neighborhood in Douglas, County Cork, a suburb of the city of Cork
- Grange stone circle in County Limerick near Lough Gur
- Grange, County Sligo
- Grange, County Tipperary
- Grange, County Waterford

=== United Kingdom ===
==== England ====
- Grange, a hamlet in the Medway district of Kent
- Grange, a hamlet near Balderstone
- Grange, Merseyside, a suburb on the Wirral
- Grange, a suburb of Grimsby
- Grange, an electoral ward in Ellesmere Port, Cheshire
- Grange, a suburb of Runcorn, Cheshire
- Grange, a suburb of Warrington, Cheshire
- Grange (Southwark ward), an electoral ward in London
- Grange Chine, Isle of Wight
- Grange in Borrowdale, Cumbria, a village
- Grange-over-Sands, Cumbria, a town
- Grange Villa, County Durham, a village
- Creech Grange, Dorset, a country house
- Thedden Grange, Hampshire, a country house

==== Northern Ireland ====
- Grange, County Armagh, a parish: see Grange St Colmcille's GAC
- Grange, County Down, a townland in County Down
- Grange, County Tyrone, a townland in the parish of Desertcreat

==== Scotland ====
- Grange, East Ayrshire, a UK location
- The Grange, Edinburgh
- Grange, Moray
- Grange, Perth and Kinross, a settlement in Perthshire
- Grange Hill, North Ayrshire

==== Wales ====
- Grangetown, Cardiff, a district and community in the south of Cardiff.

=== United States ===
- Grange, Iowa

== Vehicles ==
- Grange Class (or GWR 6800 Class), a class of steam locomotives built by Great Western Railway in 1936–1939
- HSV Grange, an Australian luxury car made by Holden Special Vehicles

== Other uses ==
- Grange (surname)
- G-Range (or AEDC Range G), a light-gas gun ballistic testing range at Arnold Air Force Base in Tennessee
- Gird's Grange, a fictional building in The Deed of Paksenarrion series of fantasy books
- Grange or The Grange, a chapter of the National Grange of the Order of Patrons of Husbandry in the United States
- Operation Grange, a British police review of the disappearance of Madeleine McCann
- Penfolds Grange, an Australian wine

== See also ==
- The Grange (disambiguation)
- Grange Academy (disambiguation)
- Grange School (disambiguation)
- Lagrange (disambiguation)
- Newgrange (disambiguation)
- Oldgrange (disambiguation)
- Granger (disambiguation)
