= Lagrange (disambiguation) =

Joseph-Louis Lagrange was an Italian mathematician, physicist and astronomer.

Lagrange, LaGrange, or La Grange may also refer to:

- Lagrange (surname), list of people with this name

== Mathematics and physics ==
- Lagrange multiplier, a mathematical technique
- Lagrange's theorem (group theory), or Lagrange's lemma, an important result in Group theory
- Lagrange's theorem (number theory), about prime numbers
- Lagrangian point, in physics and astronomy
- Lagrange polynomial
- Lagrangian mechanics

== Places ==
=== Australia ===
- Lagrange Bay, Western Australia
- La Grange (originally La Grange Mission), a dual name for Bidyadanga Community, Western Australia

=== France ===
- La Grange, Doubs
- Lagrange, Hautes-Pyrénées
- Lagrange, Landes
- Lagrange, Territoire de Belfort

=== United States ===
- LaGrange, Arkansas
- La Grange, California
- La Grange (Glasgow, Delaware)
- LaGrange, Georgia
  - LaGrange Commercial Historic District, in the National Register of Historic Places listings in Troup County, Georgia
- La Grange, Illinois, a village in Cook County
  - LaGrange Road station, a Metra and Amtrak station in La Grange, Illinois
  - Stone Avenue/LaGrange station, a Metra station in La Grange, Illinois
  - La Grange Village Historic District, in the National Register of Historic Places listings in Cook County, Illinois
- LaGrange, Indiana
- LaGrange, Tippecanoe County, Indiana
- La Grange, Kentucky
- LaGrange, Maine
- La Grange (La Plata, Maryland)
- LaGrange (Cambridge, Maryland)
- La Grange, Missouri
- LaGrange, New York
- La Grange, North Carolina
  - La Grange Historic District (North Carolina)
- LaGrange (Harris Crossroads, North Carolina)
- LaGrange, Ohio
- La Grange, Tennessee
- La Grange, Texas, a county seat
- Lagrange, Virginia
- La Grange, Monroe County, Wisconsin, a town
- La Grange, Walworth County, Wisconsin, a town
  - La Grange (community), Wisconsin, an unincorporated community
- La Grange, Wyoming, a town
- LaGrange County, Indiana
- Lagrange Township, Bond County, Illinois
- LaGrange Township, Michigan
- LaGrange Township, Lorain County, Ohio
- La Grange, U.S. Virgin Islands

=== Moon ===
- Lagrange (crater)

== Other uses ==
- Château Lagrange, a wine from Bordeaux, France
- La Grange (art museum), a museum of Aboriginal Australian art in Môtiers, Switzerland
- "La Grange" (song), released on the 1973 ZZ Top album Tres Hombres
- La Grange expedition, an 1865 exploratory expedition in Australia
- Lagrange: The Flower of Rin-ne, a 2011 mecha anime

== See also ==
- Fond La Grange, a village in Haiti
- Château de la Grange-Bléneau, a castle in France
- Lagrangian (disambiguation)
- Grange (disambiguation)
- La Grange Historic District (disambiguation)
- List of things named after Joseph-Louis Lagrange
