= La Grange Historic District =

La Grange Historic District may refer to:

in the United States (by state)

- LaGrange Commercial Historic District, LaGrange, Georgia, listed on the National Register of Historic Places (NRHP)
- La Grange Village Historic District in La Grange, Illinois, listed on the NRHP in Cook County
- LaGrange (Harris Crossroads, North Carolina), a historic district listed on the NRHP
- La Grange Historic District (North Carolina), NRHP-listed
- La Grange Historic District (La Grange, Tennessee), NRHP-listed

== See also ==
- Greenville Street-LaGrange Street Historic District, Newnan, Georgia, listed on the NRHP in Coweta County
- Fayette County Courthouse Square Historic District, La Grange, Texas, listed on the NRHP
- Lagrange (disambiguation)
