= Oldgrange =

Oldgrange or Old Grange or variation, may refer to:

== Places ==
- Oldgrange, a townland in Graiguenamanagh, Gowran, Kilkenny, Ireland; see List of townlands of County Kilkenny
- Oldgrange, a townland in Fontstown, Narragh and Reban East, Kildare, Ireland; see List of townlands of County Kildare
- Oldgrange, a townland in Narraghmore, Narragh and Reban East, Kildare, Ireland; see List of townlands of County Kildare
- Oldgrange, a townland in Monasterevin, Offaly West, Kildare, Ireland; see List of townlands of County Kildare
- Old-Grange, a townland in Easky, Tireragh, Sligo, Ireland
- Oldgrange, a townland in Tullaghmelan, Iffa and Offa West, Tipperary, Ireland; see List of townlands of County Tipperary
- Oldgrange, a townland in Mothel, Upperthird, Waterford, Ireland; see List of townlands of County Waterford

== Other uses ==
- Old Grange railway station, Grange, Adelaide, South Australia, Australia
- Grange House (also called 'Old Grange'), Bo'ness, West Lothian, Falkirk, Scotland, UK; an estate house
- The Old Grange, Burbage, Hinckley and Bosworth, Leicestershire, England, UK; a listed building, see Grade II* listed buildings in Hinckley and Bosworth
- Old Grange Schoolhouse, Bo'ness And Carriden, Falkirk, Scotland, UK; a listed building, see List of listed buildings in Bo'ness And Carriden, Falkirk
- Old Grange Store, Evansville Historic District, Evansville, Rock County, Wisconsin, USA; a NRHP-listed building, see National Register of Historic Places listings in Rock County, Wisconsin
- The Old Grange Winery, a winery in Poland formerly owned by the Krasiński family

== See also ==
- Grange (disambiguation)
- Newgrange (disambiguation)
