= H.P. Laubscher =

Lieutenant General Hendrik P. Laubscher SSA SM
- Born: 20 September 1916; Vredenburg, South Africa
- Died: 22 April 2008 (aged 91)
- Military career
- Allegiance: South Africa
- Branch: South African Army
- Service years: 1936–c. 1974
- Rank: Lieutenant General
- Commands: Chief of Staff Personnel, Chief of Staff Logistics
- Conflicts: World War II
- Awards

Lieutenant General Hendrik Pieter Laubscher SSA SM (20 September 1916 – 22 April 2008) was a South African Army officer, who served as Chief of Staff Logistics from 1975-1978.

== Army career ==
Laubscher joined the Union Defence Force in 1936 and participated in the Second World War. Paymaster and Quartermaster of the Military College after WW2. Director Administration at the Chief of Defence Staff's section. Chief of Defence Force Administration in 1970–1974. Chief of Staff Logistics from 1 Apr–31 Dec 1974.

== Awards and decorations ==
- Star of South Africa (1952) (SSA)
- Southern Cross Medal (1952) (SM)
- Union Medal
- 1939–45 Star
- Africa Star
- War Medal 1939–1945
- Africa Service Medal (WWII)

Military offices
Preceded by Maj Gen G.H.F. Markgraaff	Chief of Defence Force Administration; 1970–1974	Succeeded by Lt Gen Pieter le Grange
Unknown	Chief of Staff Logistics; 1974	Succeeded by Lt Gen Hennie Kotze
