= Le Grange =

le Grange is a South African surname. It was brought to South Africa when Pierre (la) Grange came to the Cape Colony in the 1680s from Cabrières-d'Aigues in Southern France. Pierre settled in Cape Town and bought a piece of land on the corner of Long street and Wale street. He married Margaretha Kool of Rotterdam and the Le Grange family descends from their children. This may refer to:

- Ferdie le Grange (1948–2013), South African plastic surgeon and marathon runner
- Louis le Grange (1928–1991), South African politician
- Pieter le Grange (born 1916), South African Air Force officer
- Sandra le Grange (born 1993), South African badminton player

== See also ==
- Lagrange (surname)
