= List of townlands of County Kildare =

This is a sortable table of the approximately 1,242 townlands in County Kildare, Ireland.

Duplicate names occur where there is more than one townland with the same name in the county. Names marked in bold typeface are towns and villages, and the word Town appears for those entries in the Acres column.

== Townland list ==
Townland	Acres	Barony	Civil parish	Poor law union
Abbeyland	144	Kilkea and Moone	Castledermot	Athy
Abbeyland	68	Clane	Clane	Naas
Aghafullim	142	Ikeathy and Oughterany	Clonshanbo	Celbridge
Aghanure	257	Narragh and Reban West	Kilberry	Athy
Aghards	67	North Salt	Kildrought	Celbridge
Aghpaudeen	7	Clane	Killybegs	Naas
Alasty	398	South Salt	Kill	Naas
Allenswood	75	North Salt	Confey	Celbridge
Allenwood Middle	312	Connell	Kilmeage	Naas
Allenwood North	1,945	Connell	Kilmeage	Naas
Allenwood South	1,243	Connell	Kilmeage	Naas
Alliganstown	493	Naas South	Ballybought	Naas
Annalough	115	Narragh and Reban East	Narraghmore	Athy
Ardclogh	150	South Salt	Lyons	Celbridge
Ardellis Lower	163	Offaly West	Fontstown	Athy
Ardellis Upper	284	Offaly West	Fontstown	Athy
Ardinode	304	Naas South	Ballymore Eustace	Naas
Ardinode	208	Naas South	Jago	Naas
Ardkill	628	Carbury	Ardkill	Edenderry
Ardmore	241	Narragh and Reban West	Kilberry	Athy
Ardnagross	128	Narragh and Reban West	Narraghmore	Athy
Ardrass Loweer	235	North Salt	Killadoon	Celbridge
Ardrass Upper	312	North Salt	Killadoon	Celbridge
Ardree	323	Kilkea and Moone	Ardree	Athy
Ardree	476	Kilkea and Moone	Tankardstown	Athy
Ardrew	81	Narragh and Reban West	St. John's	Athy
Ardscull	1,188	Narragh and Reban East	Moone	Athy
Arthurstown	167	South Salt	Kill	Naas
Ashgrove	75	Offaly West	Ballybrackan	Athy
Athgarrett	742	Naas North	Rathmore	Naas
Athgarvan and Blackrath	617	Connell	Greatconnell	Naas
**Athy**	Town	Narragh and Reban West	Churchtown	Athy
**Athy**	Town	Narragh and Reban West	St. John's	Athy
**Athy**	Town	Narragh and Reban West	St. Michaels	Athy
Athy	52	Narragh and Reban West	St. John's	Athy
Athy	162	Narragh and Reban West	St. Michaels	Athy
Aughrim	756	Offaly West	Lackagh	Athy
Aylemerstown	250	Kilkea and Moone	Killelan	Baltinglass
Backwestonpark	87	South Salt	Donaghcumper	Celbridge
Balkinstown	302	Offaly West	Nurney	Athy
Ballaghmoon	296	Kilkea and Moone	Ballaghmoon	Athy
Ballaghmoon Castle	266	Kilkea and Moone	Ballaghmoon	Athy
Ballina	839	Carbury	Cadamstown	Edenderry
Ballinderry	593	Carbury	Mylerstown	Edenderry
Ballindoolin	856	Carbury	Carrick	Edenderry
Ballindrum	662	Kilkea and Moone	Narraghmore	Athy
Ballinlig	395	Carbury	Kilrainy	Edenderry
Ballintaggart	280	Narragh and Reban East	Davidstown	Athy
Ballintine	309	Connell	Kilmeage	Naas
Ballinure	218	Offaly East	Rathangan	Edenderry
**Ballitore**	Town	Narragh and Reban East	Timolin	Baltinglass
Ballitore	637	Narragh and Reban East	Timolin	Baltinglass
Ballyadams	93	Narragh and Reban East	Narraghmore	Athy
Ballybarney	394	Narragh and Reban East	Davidstown	Athy
Ballybought	48	Narragh and Reban West	St. John's	Athy
Ballybought	517	Naas South	Ballybought	Naas
Ballybrack	292	Ikeathy and Oughterany	Clonshanbo	Celbridge
Ballybrack	308	Carbury	Kilpatrick	Edenderry
Ballyburn Lower	367	Kilkea and Moone	Killelan	Athy
Ballyburn Upper	252	Kilkea and Moone	Killelan	Athy
Ballycaghan	385	Ikeathy and Oughterany	Cloncurry	Celbridge
Ballycanon	589	Ikeathy and Oughterany	Cloncurry	Celbridge
Ballycommon	33	South Salt	Clonaghlis	Celbridge
Ballycowan	173	Carbury	Nurney	Edenderry
Ballycullane	440	Narragh and Reban East	Tankardstown	Athy
Ballycullane Lower	237	Kilkea and Moone	Kineagh	Baltinglass
Ballycullane Upper	290	Kilkea and Moone	Kineagh	Baltinglass
Ballycurraghan	77	North Salt	Laraghbryan	Celbridge
Ballydallagh	41	Naas South	Ballymore Eustace	Naas
Ballyfair	140	Offaly East	Ballysax	Naas
Ballyfarson	177	Offaly West	Monasterevin	Athy
Ballygaddy	116	Offaly East	Rathangan	Edenderry
Ballygibbon East	568	Carbury	Carrick	Edenderry
Ballygibbon West	758	Carbury	Carrick	Edenderry
Ballygoran	353	North Salt	Laraghbryan	Celbridge
Ballygreany	441	Offaly West	Duneany	Athy
Ballyhade	287	Kilkea and Moone	Castledermot	Carlow
Ballyhagan	1,115	Carbury	Carbury	Edenderry
Ballyhays	136	Naas North	Whitechurch	Naas
Ballykeelan	136	Ikeathy and Oughterany	Cloncurry	Celbridge
Ballykelly	391	Offaly West	Lackagh	Athy
Ballyloughan	119	Ikeathy and Oughterany	Clonshanbo	Celbridge
Ballymadeer	147	South Salt	Stacumny	Celbridge
Ballymakealy Lower	113	North Salt	Killadoon	Celbridge
Ballymakealy Upper	149	North Salt	Killadoon	Celbridge
Ballymany	506	Offaly East	Ballymany	Naas
**Ballymore Eustace**	Town	Naas South	Ballymore Eustace	Naas
Ballymore Eustace East	919	Naas South	Ballymore Eustace	Naas
Ballymore Eustace West	381	Naas South	Ballymore Eustace	Naas
Ballymount	315	Narragh and Reban East	Usk	Naas
Ballynabarna	240	Narragh and Reban West	Narraghmore	Athy
Ballynaboley	216	Clane	Clane	Naas
Ballynacarrick Lower	465	Kilkea and Moone	Killelan	Baltinglass
Ballynacarrick Upper	187	Kilkea and Moone	Killelan	Baltinglass
Ballynadrumny	263	Carbury	Ballynadrumny	Edenderry
Ballynafagh	1,154	Clane	Ballynafagh	Naas
Ballynagalliagh (or Mayfield)	303	Offaly West	Duneany	Athy
Ballynagappagh	716	Clane	Clane	Naas
Ballynagussaun	203	Narragh and Reban East	Fontstown	Athy
Ballynakill	590	Ikeathy and Oughterany	Cloncurry	Celbridge
Ballynakill	735	Carbury	Ballynadrumny	Edenderry
Ballynakill Lower	338	Carbury	Kilpatrick	Edenderry
Ballynakill Upper	542	Carbury	Kilpatrick	Edenderry
Ballynamony	141	Kilkea and Moone	Kilkea	Athy
Ballynamullagh	611	Carbury	Mylerstown	Edenderry
Ballynasculloge	80	Narragh and Reban West	Churchtown	Athy
Ballyneage (or Hybla)	641	Offaly West	Duneany	Athy
Ballyonan	603	Carbury	Ballynadrumny	Edenderry
Ballyoulster	73	South Salt	Donaghcumper	Celbridge
Ballyraggan	714	Kilkea and Moone	Graney	Baltinglass
Ballyroe	427	Narragh and Reban West	Churchtown	Athy
Ballyroe	356	Kilkea and Moone	Tankardstown	Athy
Ballysax Great	772	Offaly East	Ballysax	Naas
Ballysax Little	271	Offaly East	Ballysax	Naas
Ballysaxhills	446	Offaly East	Ballysax	Naas
Ballysaxplain	383	Offaly East	Ballysax	Naas
Ballyshannon	227	Offaly West	Ballyshannon	Athy
Ballyshannon	141	Carbury	Ardkill	Edenderry
Ballyshannon Demesne	161	Offaly West	Ballyshannon	Athy
Ballysize	206	Clane	Brideschurch	Naas
Ballysooghan	600	Offaly East	Rathangan	Edenderry
Ballysooghan	177	Offaly East	Rathangan	Edenderry
Ballyteige	162	Ikeathy and Oughterany	Scullogestown	Celbridge
Ballyteige North	876	Connell	Kilmeage	Naas
Ballyteige South	543	Connell	Kilmeage	Naas
Ballyvannan	50	Kilkea and Moone	Castledermot	Athy
Ballyvarney	197	Offaly West	Walterstown	Athy
Ballyvass	765	Kilkea and Moone	Castledermot	Athy
Ballyvoneen	612	Ikeathy and Oughterany	Cloncurry	Celbridge
Balrinnet	402	Carbury	Nurney	Edenderry
Balscott	117	South Salt	Stacumny	Celbridge
Baltracey	707	Ikeathy and Oughterany	Balraheen	Celbridge
Baltracey	175	Naas North	Tipper	Naas
Barberstown	139	North Salt	Straffan	Celbridge
Barberstown Lower	199	North Salt	Straffan	Celbridge
Barberstown Upper	152	North Salt	Straffan	Celbridge
Barkersford	128	Narragh and Reban West	Kilberry	Athy
Barnacrow	342	Connell	Rathernan	Naas
Barnaran	174	Offaly East	Cloncurry	Edenderry
Barnhall	224	North Salt	Leixlip	Celbridge
Barnhill	99	Kilkea and Moone	Graney	Athy
Barnhill East	119	Kilkea and Moone	Castledermot	Athy
Barnhill West	213	Kilkea and Moone	Castledermot	Athy
Baronrath	372	Naas North	Whitechurch	Naas
Baronsland	201	Kilcullen	Kilcullen	Naas
Baronstown East	435	Connell	Rathernan	Naas
Baronstown West	354	Connell	Rathernan	Naas
Barraderra	190	Offaly West	Monasterevin	Athy
Barreen	295	Ikeathy and Oughterany	Balraheen	Celbridge
Barretstown	509	Naas South	Tipperkevin	Naas
Barrettstown	366	Clane	Brideschurch	Naas
Barrettstown	1,145	Connell	Oldconnell	Naas
Barrogstown	155	North Salt	Laraghbryan	Celbridge
Barrogstown East	89	North Salt	Donaghmore	Celbridge
Barrogstown West	119	North Salt	Donaghmore	Celbridge
Barrowford	105	Narragh and Reban West	Kilberry	Athy
Battlemount	781	Narragh and Reban East	Narraghmore	Athy
Bawn	127	Offaly West	Harristown	Athy
Bawnoge	263	Naas South	Tipperkevin	Naas
Bawnoges	230	North Salt	Straffan	Celbridge
Baybush	196	North Salt	Straffan	Celbridge
Baybush	70	North Salt	Taghadoe	Celbridge
Baysland	71	South Salt	Haynestown	Naas
Beaconstown	522	Kilkea and Moone	Kilkea	Athy
Belan	1,197	Kilkea and Moone	Belan	Athy
Belgard	287	Ikeathy and Oughterany	Clonshanbo	Celbridge
Belview	99	Narragh and Reban West	Kilberry	Athy
Bennetsbridge	416	Narragh and Reban West	St. John's	Athy
Bert Demesne	192	Narragh and Reban West	Kilberry	Athy
Betaghstown	621	Clane	Clane	Naas
Bigbog	228	Kilkea and Moone	Castledermot	Athy
Bishopscourt Lower	249	South Salt	Oughterard	Naas
Bishopscourt Upper	409	South Salt	Oughterard	Naas
Bishopshill Commons	58	Naas South	Ballymore Eustace	Naas
Bishopsland	561	Naas South	Ballymore Eustace	Naas
Bishopsland	115	Offaly East	Kildare	Naas
Bishopslane	87	Naas South	Ballymore Eustace	Naas
Blackcastle	173	Kilkea and Moone	Dunmanoge	Athy
Blackchurch	229	South Salt	Kilteel	Naas
Blackditch	344	Offaly West	Nurney	Athy
Blackdown	151	South Salt	Kilteel	Naas
Blackford	197	Narragh and Reban West	Churchtown	Athy
Blackhall	396	Narragh and Reban East	Davidstown	Athy
Blackhall	614	Naas North	Bodenstown	Naas
Blackhall	345	Naas North	Rathmore	Naas
Blackhill	175	South Salt	Oughterard	Naas
Blackmillershill	114	Offaly East	Dunmurry	Naas
Blackparks	51	Narragh and Reban West	St. John's	Athy
Blackrath	1,156	Narragh and Reban East	Narraghmore	Athy
Blackrath and Athgarvan	617	Connell	Greatconnell	Naas
Blacktrench	334	Connell	Oldconnell	Naas
Blackwood	661	Narragh and Reban West	Kilberry	Athy
Blackwood	44	Clane	Downings	Naas
Blackwood	421	Clane	Timahoe	Naas
Blakestown	206	North Salt	Laraghbryan	Celbridge
Blakestown	39	Offaly East	Feighcullen	Edenderry
Blakestown	118	Connell	Feighcullen	Naas
Bleach	90	Narragh and Reban West	St. John's	Athy
Bluebell	135	Naas North	Naas	Naas
Bodenstown	380	Naas North	Bodenstown	Naas
Boghall	344	Offaly West	Harristown	Athy
Boherbaun Lower	462	Offaly West	Harristown	Athy
Boherbaun Upper (or Monapheeby)	374	Offaly West	Harristown	Athy
Bohergoy Lower	361	Offaly East	Ballysax	Naas
Bohergoy Upper	236	Offaly East	Ballysax	Naas
Boherhole	465	Ikeathy and Oughterany	Mainham	Celbridge
Boherkill	431	Offaly East	Rathangan	Naas
Boherphilip	74	South Salt	Kill	Naas
Boley Great	434	Narragh and Reban East	Fontstown	Athy
Boley Little	251	Narragh and Reban East	Fontstown	Athy
Boleybeg	90	Offaly West	Fontstown	Athy
Boleybeg	521	Narragh and Reban East	Narraghmore	Athy
Boleybeg	593	Naas South	Jago	Naas
Bolton	438	Kilkea and Moone	Killelan	Baltinglass
Bonaghmore	149	Offaly East	Rathangan	Edenderry
Borough	172	Offaly West	Kilrush	Athy
Boston	488	South Salt	Oughterard	Naas
Bostoncommon	32	Offaly East	Cloncurry	Edenderry
Bostoncommon	24	Offaly East	Feighcullen	Edenderry
Boycetown	592	Ikeathy and Oughterany	Kilcock	Celbridge
Brackagh	319	Carbury	Carrick	Edenderry
Brackney	308	Narragh and Reban West	Churchtown	Athy
Brallistown	242	Offaly East	Kildare	Naas
Brallistown Commons	5	Offaly East	Kildare	Naas
Brallistown Little	4	Offaly East	Kildare	Naas
Branganstown	281	Ikeathy and Oughterany	Kilcock	Celbridge
Brannockstown	137	Naas South	Brannockstown	Naas
Brannockstown	114	Naas South	Gilltown	Naas
Bray Lower	326	Kilkea and Moone	St. Michaels	Athy
Bray Upper	240	Kilkea and Moone	St. Michaels	Athy
Brewel East (or Merville)	418	Narragh and Reban East	Usk	Naas
Brewel West	301	Narragh and Reban East	Usk	Naas
Briencan	217	Naas South	Ballymore Eustace	Naas
Broadfield	401	Naas North	Naas	Naas
Broadleas Commons	465	Naas South	Ballymore Eustace	Naas
Broadstown	265	Kilkea and Moone	Graney	Baltinglass
Brockagh	514	Clane	Timahoe	Naas
Broguestown	122	South Salt	Kill	Naas
Brownstown	137	Narragh and Reban West	Churchtown	Athy
Brownstown	379	Naas South	Carnalway	Naas
Brownstown Great	376	Offaly East	Ballysax	Naas
Brownstown Little	78	Offaly East	Ballysax	Naas
Brownstown Lower	283	Offaly East	Carn	Naas
Brownstown Upper	238	Offaly East	Carn	Naas
Brumlin	54	Naas South	Ballymore Eustace	Naas
Bryanstown	198	North Salt	Taghadoe	Celbridge
Bullhill	272	Narragh and Reban East	Davidstown	Athy
Bullockpark	40	Naas North	Tipper	Naas
Burntfurze	131	South Salt	Haynestown	Naas
Burtonhall Demesne	318	Kilkea and Moone	Castledermot	Carlow
Burtown Big	783	Kilkea and Moone	Moone	Athy
Burtown Little	438	Kilkea and Moone	Moone	Athy
Bushypark	278	Offaly West	Kilrush	Athy
Butterstream Commons	1	Clane	Clane	Naas
Cadamstown	1,154	Carbury	Cadamstown	Edenderry
Calf Field	102	Carbury	Ballynadrumny	Edenderry
Calfstown	272	Carbury	Mylerstown	Edenderry
Calverstown	786	Narragh and Reban East	Davidstown	Athy
Calverstown Demesne	223	Narragh and Reban East	Davidstown	Athy
Calverstown Little	407	Narragh and Reban East	Davidstown	Athy
Cannonstown	210	Connell	Feighcullen	Naas
Capdoo	122	Clane	Clane	Naas
Capdoo Commons	113	Clane	Clane	Naas
Cappagh	886	Ikeathy and Oughterany	Cloncurry	Celbridge
Cappanargid	1,450	Offaly East	Cloncurry	Edenderry
Carbury	671	Carbury	Carbury	Edenderry
Cardington	85	Narragh and Reban West	Churchtown	Athy
Cardington Demesne	96	Narragh and Reban West	Churchtown	Athy
Carn	276	Offaly East	Carn	Naas
Carnalway	752	Naas South	Carnalway	Naas
Carragh	457	Clane	Carragh	Naas
Carrick	689	Carbury	Carrick	Edenderry
Carrick	359	Connell	Rathernan	Naas
Carrickanearla	1,778	Offaly East	Dunmurry	Naas
Carrigeen	105	Clane	Clane	Naas
Carrigeen North	440	Kilkea and Moone	Kineagh	Baltinglass
Carrigeen South	397	Kilkea and Moone	Kineagh	Baltinglass
Carrigeenhill	211	Kilkea and Moone	Kineagh	Baltinglass
Carrighill Lower	149	Offaly West	Ballyshannon	Athy
Carrighill Upper	161	Offaly West	Ballyshannon	Athy
Cartersbog	13	Kilcullen	Kilcullen	Naas
Carton Demesne	963	North Salt	Laraghbryan	Celbridge
Castlebrown (or Clongowes)	704	Ikeathy and Oughterany	Mainham	Celbridge
Castledeely	637	Clane	Brideschurch	Naas
**Castledermot**	Town	Kilkea and Moone	Castledermot	Athy
Castledermot	120	Kilkea and Moone	Castledermot	Athy
Castledillon Lower	163	South Salt	Castledillon	Celbridge
Castledillon Upper	358	South Salt	Castledillon	Celbridge
Castlefarm	139	Narragh and Reban East	Fontstown	Athy
Castlefarm	166	Offaly West	Kilrush	Athy
Castlefish	210	Kilcullen	Kilcullen	Naas
Castlemartin	442	Kilcullen	Kilcullen	Naas
Castlemitchell North	723	Narragh and Reban West	Churchtown	Athy
Castlemitchell South	327	Narragh and Reban West	Churchtown	Athy
Castlereban North	696	Narragh and Reban West	Churchtown	Athy
Castlereban South	221	Narragh and Reban West	Churchtown	Athy
Castleroe East	295	Kilkea and Moone	Dunmanoge	Athy
Castleroe West	512	Kilkea and Moone	Dunmanoge	Athy
Castlesize	218	Naas North	Bodenstown	Naas
Castletown	647	North Salt	Kildrought	Celbridge
Castlewarden North	467	South Salt	Oughterard	Naas
Castlewarden South	112	South Salt	Oughterard	Naas
Catherinestown	114	North Salt	Laraghbryan	Celbridge
Caureen	110	Naas North	Rathmore	Naas
**Celbridge**	Town	South Salt	Donaghcumper	Celbridge
**Celbridge**	Town	North Salt	Kildrought	Celbridge
Celbridge	2,112	North Salt	Kildrought	Celbridge
Celbridge Abbey	13	South Salt	Donaghcumper	Celbridge
Celbridgeabbey	119	North Salt	Kildrought	Celbridge
Chanterlands	70	Narragh and Reban West	St. Michaels	Athy
Chapelfarm	192	Offaly West	Kilrush	Athy
Cherrymills	158	Offaly West	Harristown	Athy
Cherryville	472	Offaly West	Lackagh	Athy
Christianstown	507	Connell	Feighcullen	Naas
Churchland East	68	Offaly East	Carn	Naas
Churchland South	24	Offaly East	Carn	Naas
Churchland West	9	Offaly East	Carn	Naas
Churchtown North	197	Narragh and Reban West	Churchtown	Athy
Churchtown South	95	Narragh and Reban West	Churchtown	Athy
**Clane**	Town	Clane	Clane	Naas
Clane	736	Clane	Clane	Naas
Clarey	448	Offaly West	Harristown	Athy
Clogheen	386	Offaly West	Lackagh	Athy
Clogheen	525	Offaly West	Monasterevin	Athy
Cloghgarret Glebe	62	Offaly East	Kildare	Naas
Clogorrow	358	Narragh and Reban West	Kilberry	Athy
Clonagh	251	North Salt	Taghadoe	Celbridge
Clonagh	694	Carbury	Cadamstown	Edenderry
Clonagh	461	Carbury	Dunfierth	Edenderry
Clonaghlis	444	South Salt	Clonaghlis	Celbridge
Clonard New	63	Carbury	Kilrainy	Edenderry
Cloncarlin (or Globeisland)	359	Offaly West	Monasterevin	Athy
Cloncumber	466	Connell	Kilmeage	Naas
Cloncurry	183	Ikeathy and Oughterany	Cloncurry	Celbridge
Cloncurry	182	Offaly East	Cloncurry	Edenderry
Clondown	158	Offaly West	Lackagh	Athy
Clonduff	206	Ikeathy and Oughterany	Balraheen	Celbridge
Clonegath	596	Offaly West	Monasterevin	Athy
Cloney	1,518	Narragh and Reban West	Kilberry	Athy
Cloneybeg	527	Offaly West	Harristown	Athy
Clonfert North	212	Ikeathy and Oughterany	Balraheen	Celbridge
Clonfert South	238	Ikeathy and Oughterany	Balraheen	Celbridge
Clongorey	516	Connell	Feighcullen	Naas
Clongowes (or Castlebrown)	704	Ikeathy and Oughterany	Mainham	Celbridge
Clongownagh	158	Connell	Feighcullen	Naas
Clonkeen	1,759	Carbury	Carbury	Edenderry
Clonkeeran	577	Carbury	Mylerstown	Edenderry
Clonmayle	263	Offaly East	Rathangan	Edenderry
Clonmoyle West	572	Offaly East	Rathangan	Edenderry
Clonmullin	11	Narragh and Reban West	St. John's	Athy
Clonmullin	55	Narragh and Reban West	St. Michaels	Athy
Clonsast	265	Ikeathy and Oughterany	Kilcock	Celbridge
Clonshanbo	444	Ikeathy and Oughterany	Clonshanbo	Celbridge
Clonuff	553	Carbury	Mylerstown	Edenderry
Clownings	619	Connell	Greatconnell	Naas
Clownings	409	Naas North	Whitechurch	Naas
Coghlandtown	367	Naas South	Ballymore Eustace	Naas
Coghlanstown	1,137	Naas South	Coghlanstown	Naas
Colbinstown	251	Narragh and Reban East	Davidstown	Athy
Coldwells	299	Naas South	Ballybought	Naas
Collaghknock Glebe	143	Offaly East	Kildare	Naas
Collegeland	136	North Salt	Laraghbryan	Celbridge
Collin	265	Kilkea and Moone	Killelan	Baltinglass
Collinstown	197	North Salt	Leixlip	Celbridge
Collinstown	505	Carbury	Ardkill	Edenderry
Coltstown	98	Kilkea and Moone	Castledermot	Athy
Coltstown	354	Kilkea and Moone	Graney	Baltinglass
Common	4	Ikeathy and Oughterany	Mainham	Celbridge
Common	26	Kilcullen	Kilcullen	Naas
Common	110	Connell	Morristownbiller	Naas
Common (or Kingsbog)	663	Offaly East	Kildare	Naas
Common North	112	Offaly East	Carn	Naas
Commons	93	South Salt	Donaghcumper	Celbridge
Commons	14	Naas South	Tipperkevin	Naas
Commons East	16	Ikeathy and Oughterany	Kilcock	Celbridge
Commons Lower	115	South Salt	Lyons	Celbridge
Commons South	48	Ikeathy and Oughterany	Kilcock	Celbridge
Commons South	4	Offaly East	Carn	Naas
Commons Upper	243	South Salt	Lyons	Celbridge
Commons West	41	Ikeathy and Oughterany	Kilcock	Celbridge
Commonstown	586	Kilkea and Moone	Killelan	Baltinglass
Concealment	350	Offaly West	Lackagh	Athy
Coneyburrow	9	Narragh and Reban West	St. John's	Athy
Coneyburrow	85	Narragh and Reban West	St. Michaels	Athy
Coneyburrow	79	South Salt	Donaghcumper	Celbridge
Confey	947	North Salt	Confey	Celbridge
Conlanstown	262	Offaly East	Cloncurry	Naas
Coolagh	267	Offaly West	Harristown	Athy
Coolaght	584	Connell	Rathernan	Naas
Coolahocka	119	South Salt	Kilteel	Naas
Coolane	240	Kilkea and Moone	Kilkea	Athy
Coolatogher	180	Offaly West	Lackagh	Athy
Coolavacoose	187	Carbury	Kilmore	Edenderry
Coolcarriga	1,737	Clane	Timahoe	Naas
Coolcor	353	Carbury	Carbury	Edenderry
Coolearagh East	300	Clane	Timahoe	Naas
Coolearagh West	608	Clane	Timahoe	Naas
Coolellan	289	Offaly East	Rathangan	Edenderry
Coolfitch	70	South Salt	Donaghcumper	Celbridge
Coolier	24	Offaly West	Lackagh	Athy
Coolnafearagh	629	Offaly West	Monasterevin	Athy
Coologmartin	661	Clane	Timahoe	Naas
Coolrake	299	Kilkea and Moone	Killelan	Baltinglass
Coolreagh	151	Connell	Oldconnell	Naas
Coolree	341	Carbury	Dunfierth	Edenderry
Coolree	387	Clane	Downings	Naas
Coolroe	198	Narragh and Reban West	Churchtown	Athy
Coolsickin (or Quinsborough)	617	Offaly West	Lackagh	Athy
Cooltrim North	157	Ikeathy and Oughterany	Donadea	Celbridge
Cooltrim South	313	Ikeathy and Oughterany	Donadea	Celbridge
Coolyphullagh	328	Offaly West	Kilrush	Athy
Coonagh	397	Carbury	Ardkill	Edenderry
Corballis	373	Kilkea and Moone	Kineagh	Baltinglass
Corbally	176	North Salt	Taghadoe	Celbridge
Corbally	458	Connell	Kildare	Naas
Corcoranstown	441	Ikeathy and Oughterany	Cloncurry	Celbridge
Corduff	920	Clane	Timahoe	Naas
Corkeragh	199	Clane	Ballynafagh	Naas
Cormickstown	254	North Salt	Laraghbryan	Celbridge
Cornamucklagh	435	Carbury	Kilrainy	Edenderry
Cornelscourt	233	Connell	Morristownbiller	Naas
Corwig	210	Carbury	Carrick	Edenderry
Cott	212	Clane	Killybegs	Naas
Courtown Great	233	Ikeathy and Oughterany	Kilcock	Celbridge
Courtown Little	124	Ikeathy and Oughterany	Kilcock	Celbridge
Courttown East	192	Narragh and Reban West	Churchtown	Athy
Courttown West	124	Narragh and Reban West	Churchtown	Athy
Cowanstown	179	North Salt	Taghadoe	Celbridge
Cowpasture	179	Offaly West	Monasterevin	Athy
Cradockstown Demesne	379	Naas North	Tipper	Naas
Cradockstown East	157	Naas North	Tipper	Naas
Cradockstown North	121	Naas North	Tipper	Naas
Cradockstown West	320	Naas North	Tipper	Naas
Cramersvalley	35	Naas South	Brannockstown	Naas
Crawnglass	240	Offaly West	Ballyshannon	Athy
Crewhill	215	North Salt	Laraghbryan	Celbridge
Crinstown	226	North Salt	Laraghbryan	Celbridge
Crippaun	146	North Salt	Killadoon	Celbridge
Crockanure Glebe	59	Offaly East	Kildare	Naas
Crockaun	331	Offaly West	Ballyshannon	Athy
Crockaun Commons	42	Clane	Clane	Naas
Crodaun	78	North Salt	Kildrought	Celbridge
Crohanree	295	Narragh and Reban West	Churchtown	Athy
Cromwellstown	443	South Salt	Kilteel	Naas
Cromwellstownhill	320	South Salt	Kilteel	Naas
Crooket	289	Kilkea and Moone	Killelan	Athy
Crookstown East	40	Narragh and Reban East	Narraghmore	Baltinglass
Crookstown Lower	296	Narragh and Reban East	Narraghmore	Athy
Crookstown Upper	994	Narragh and Reban East	Narraghmore	Baltinglass
Crophill	151	Kilkea and Moone	Castledermot	Athy
Crosscoolharbour	110	Naas North	Rathmore	Naas
Crossmorris	168	Offaly West	Lackagh	Athy
Crotanstown	150	Connell	Morristownbiller	Naas
Cullaghreeva	32	North Salt	Confey	Celbridge
Cupidstown	240	South Salt	Kilteel	Naas
Cupidstownhill	301	South Salt	Kilteel	Naas
Curragh	2,141	Offaly East	Ballysax	Naas
Curragh	2,744	Offaly East	Kildare	Naas
Curraghfarm	206	Offaly East	Kildare	Naas
Curryhills	817	Clane	Killybegs	Naas
Cush	172	Offaly West	Ballybrackan	Athy
Cushaling	843	Offaly East	Rathangan	Edenderry
Daars North	242	Naas North	Bodenstown	Naas
Daars South	426	Naas North	Bodenstown	Naas
Dairyfarm	85	Kilkea and Moone	Castledermot	Athy
Dalkinstown	256	Kilcullen	Kilcullen	Naas
Dangan	171	South Salt	Lyons	Celbridge
Danielstown	136	Ikeathy and Oughterany	Mainham	Celbridge
Davidstown	267	Narragh and Reban East	Davidstown	Athy
Davidstown	223	Kilkea and Moone	Killelan	Baltinglass
Davidstown (or Pilsworth)	367	Kilkea and Moone	Graney	Baltinglass
Davidstown Demesne	279	Kilkea and Moone	Killelan	Baltinglass
Davidstown Lower	271	Kilkea and Moone	Graney	Athy
Davidstown Upper	295	Kilkea and Moone	Graney	Athy
Deerpark	158	Kilkea and Moone	Castledermot	Carlow
Delamain	171	Naas South	Carnalway	Naas
Demesne	79	Carbury	Ardkill	Edenderry
Demesne	360	Carbury	Carbury	Edenderry
Derreens	426	Clane	Carragh	Naas
Derrinstown	133	North Salt	Taghadoe	Celbridge
Derrinturn	340	Carbury	Ardkill	Edenderry
Derryart	43	Carbury	Nurney	Edenderry
Derrybrennan	273	Carbury	Kilpatrick	Edenderry
Derrycrib	624	Clane	Ballynafagh	Naas
Derrylea	1,205	Offaly West	Lackagh	Athy
Derrymullen	533	Connell	Kilmeage	Naas
Derrynine	263	Offaly West	Fontstown	Athy
Derryoughter East	600	Offaly West	Ballybrackan	Athy
Derryoughter West	654	Offaly West	Ballybrackan	Athy
Derryvarroge	1,115	Clane	Timahoe	Naas
Dollardstown	189	Kilkea and Moone	Tankardstown	Athy
Donadea North	450	Ikeathy and Oughterany	Donadea	Celbridge
Donadea South	379	Ikeathy and Oughterany	Donadea	Celbridge
Donaghcumper	337	South Salt	Donaghcumper	Celbridge
Donaghmore	92	North Salt	Donaghmore	Celbridge
Donaghstown	300	North Salt	Laraghbryan	Celbridge
Donode	49	Naas South	Ballymore Eustace	Naas
Donode	378	Naas South	Coghlanstown	Naas
Donore	896	Clane	Carragh	Naas
Dowdenstown Great	334	Naas South	Tipperkevin	Naas
Dowdenstown Little	109	Connell	Ladytown	Naas
Dowdstown	199	North Salt	Laraghbryan	Celbridge
Downings North	878	Clane	Downings	Naas
Downings South	475	Clane	Downings	Naas
Dreenan	371	Carbury	Ardkill	Edenderry
Drehid	2,161	Carbury	Ardkill	Edenderry
Drinnanstown North	404	Offaly East	Cloncurry	Edenderry
Drinnanstown South	404	Offaly East	Cloncurry	Edenderry
Drummond	733	Carbury	Kilpatrick	Edenderry
Drumsru	348	Offaly East	Feighcullen	Edenderry
Drumsru	674	Connell	Kilmeage	Naas
Dunbyrne	490	Connell	Rathernan	Naas
Duncreevan	131	Ikeathy and Oughterany	Kilcock	Celbridge
Duneany	1,092	Offaly West	Duneany	Athy
Dunfierth	651	Carbury	Dunfierth	Edenderry
Dunmanoge	318	Kilkea and Moone	Dunmanoge	Athy
Dunmurraghill	501	Ikeathy and Oughterany	Dunmurraghill	Celbridge
Dunmurry East	301	Offaly East	Dunmurry	Naas
Dunmurry West	495	Offaly East	Dunmurry	Naas
Dunnstown	522	Naas South	Carnalway	Naas
Dysart	632	Carbury	Dunfierth	Edenderry
Eadestown	461	Naas North	Rathmore	Naas
Eaglehill	337	Offaly West	Kilrush	Athy
Easton	134	North Salt	Leixlip	Celbridge
Ellistown	467	Offaly East	Rathangan	Edenderry
Elmhall	124	South Salt	Donaghcumper	Celbridge
Elmhall	12	South Salt	Stacumny	Celbridge
Elone	213	Offaly West	Kilrush	Athy
Elverstown Great	248	Naas South	Tipperkevin	Naas
Elverstown Little	161	Naas South	Tipperkevin	Naas
Emlagher	82	Offaly East	Carn	Naas
Eskerhill	137	Offaly West	Harristown	Athy
Fallarees Commons	7	Naas South	Ballymore Eustace	Naas
Fanaghs	409	Ikeathy and Oughterany	Cloncurry	Celbridge
Farranadum	259	Ikeathy and Oughterany	Clonshanbo	Celbridge
Fasagh	199	Offaly West	Ballybrackan	Athy
Fearaun	207	Offaly West	Kilrush	Athy
Fearavolla	74	Carbury	Nurney	Edenderry
Fearmore	65	Offaly West	Ballybrackan	Athy
Feighcullen	720	Offaly East	Feighcullen	Edenderry
Fennor	308	Offaly West	Duneany	Athy
Firmount Demesne	169	Clane	Clane	Naas
Firmount East	163	Clane	Clane	Naas
Firmount West	163	Clane	Clane	Naas
Flemingtown North	137	Naas South	Killashee	Naas
Flemingtown South (or Tonaphuca)	448	Naas South	Killashee	Naas
Fleshtown	341	Clane	Killybegs	Naas
Fodeens	241	South Salt	Kill	Naas
Fontstown Lower	352	Narragh and Reban East	Fontstown	Athy
Fontstown Upper	326	Narragh and Reban East	Fontstown	Athy
Forenaghts Great	252	South Salt	Forenaghts	Naas
Forenaghts Little	210	South Salt	Forenaghts	Naas
Forest	315	Narragh and Reban West	Kilberry	Athy
Foxhill	578	Narragh and Reban East	Moone	Athy
Foy	19	Offaly East	Rathangan	Edenderry
Freagh	223	Carbury	Kilmore	Edenderry
Friarstown	170	South Salt	Castledillon	Celbridge
Friarstown	478	Offaly East	Tully	Naas
Furryhill	673	Naas North	Rathmore	Naas
Gaganstown	512	Naas South	Jago	Naas
Gallowshill	306	Narragh and Reban West	St. Michaels	Athy
Gallowshill	106	Gowran	Gowran	Kilkenny
Garrisker	855	Carbury	Ballynadrumny	Edenderry
Garterfarm	124	Kilkea and Moone	Castledermot	Athy
Garvoge	618	Clane	Ballynafagh	Naas
Geraldine	356	Narragh and Reban West	Kilberry	Athy
Gilbinstown	374	Kilcullen	Kilcullen	Naas
Gilltown	932	Clane	Ballynafagh	Naas
Gilltown	1,195	Naas South	Gilltown	Naas
Gilltown Common	5	Kilcullen	Kilcullen	Naas
Gingerstown	195	Clane	Carragh	Naas
Glassely	660	Narragh and Reban East	Narraghmore	Athy
Glebe	34	Narragh and Reban East	Timolin	Baltinglass
Glebe	81	North Salt	Straffan	Celbridge
Glebe East	124	Naas South	Tipperkevin	Naas
Glebe North	143	Kilcullen	Kilcullen	Naas
Glebe South	80	Kilcullen	Kilcullen	Naas
Glebe West	127	Naas South	Tipperkevin	Naas
Glenaree	282	Offaly East	Cloncurry	Edenderry
Glenmore	351	Naas South	Tipperkevin	Naas
Globe Island (or Cloncarlin)	359	Offaly West	Monasterevin	Athy
Glowens	273	Kilkea and Moone	Kineagh	Baltinglass
Goatstown	339	Clane	Downings	Naas
Gormanstown	919	Kilcullen	Kilcullen	Naas
Gorteen	87	Offaly West	Ballybrackan	Athy
Gorteen	353	Carbury	Dunfierth	Edenderry
Gorteen Lower	129	Offaly West	Fontstown	Athy
Gorteen Upper	341	Offaly West	Fontstown	Athy
Gorteenoona	69	Offaly West	Monasterevin	Athy
Gorteenvacan	283	Kilkea and Moone	Castledermot	Athy
Gotham	221	Kilkea and Moone	Ballaghmoon	Athy
Goulyduff	375	Narragh and Reban West	Churchtown	Athy
Gragadder	175	Ikeathy and Oughterany	Kilcock	Celbridge
Graigrooth	41	Ikeathy and Oughterany	Cloncurry	Celbridge
Graiguelin	204	North Salt	Taghadoe	Celbridge
Graiguepottle	240	Ikeathy and Oughterany	Balraheen	Celbridge
Graigues	330	Clane	Downings	Naas
Graiguesallagh	393	North Salt	Taghadoe	Celbridge
Graney East	175	Kilkea and Moone	Graney	Baltinglass
Graney West	233	Kilkea and Moone	Graney	Baltinglass
Grange	541	Ikeathy and Oughterany	Cloncurry	Celbridge
Grange Beg	1,832	Naas South	Gilltown	Naas
Grange East	107	Carbury	Carrick	Edenderry
Grange More	645	Naas South	Gilltown	Naas
Grange West	200	Carbury	Carrick	Edenderry
Grangebeg	389	Offaly West	Monasterevin	Athy
Grangeclare	162	Offaly East	Grangeclare	Edenderry
Grangeclare East	308	Connell	Kilmeage	Naas
Grangeclare Little	7	Connell	Kilmeage	Naas
Grangecommon	23	Offaly East	Cloncurry	Naas
Grangecommon	1	Offaly East	Dunmurry	Naas
Grangecommon	24	Connell	Feighcullen	Naas
Grangecoor	243	Offaly West	Monasterevin	Athy
Grangeford	124	Kilkea and Moone	Killelan	Baltinglass
Grangehiggin	888	Connell	Rathernan	Naas
Grangelcalre West	369	Connell	Kilmeage	Naas
Grangemellon	924	Kilkea and Moone	Tankardstown	Athy
Grangemore	148	Naas South	Brannockstown	Naas
Grangerosnolvan	153	Kilkea and Moone	Grangerosnolvan	Athy
Grangerosnolvan Lower	749	Kilkea and Moone	Grangerosnolvan	Athy
Grangerosnolvan Upper	519	Kilkea and Moone	Grangerosnolvan	Athy
Graysland	2	Narragh and Reban West	St. John's	Athy
Graysland	53	Narragh and Reban West	St. Michaels	Athy
Greatconnell	1,312	Connell	Greatconnell	Naas
Greatrath	230	Offaly West	Kilrush	Athy
Greenfield	197	North Salt	Laraghbryan	Celbridge
Greenhall Lower	100	Naas South	Tipperkevin	Naas
Greenhall Upper	77	Naas South	Tipperkevin	Naas
Greenhills	419	Connell	Kildare	Naas
Greenhills	199	South Salt	Kill	Naas
Greenmount	122	Naas North	Rathmore	Naas
Greyabbey	169	Offaly East	Kildare	Naas
Griffinrath	472	North Salt	Laraghbryan	Celbridge
Guidensown North	182	Offaly East	Rathangan	Naas
Guidenstown South	273	Offaly East	Rathangan	Naas
Haggard	536	Carbury	Carbury	Edenderry
Halfmiletown	22	Kilkea and Moone	Castledermot	Athy
Hallahoise	895	Kilkea and Moone	Killelan	Athy
Halverstown	363	Clane	Carragh	Naas
Halverstown	340	Kilcullen	Kilcullen	Naas
Harristown	618	Naas South	Carnalway	Naas
Harristown Common	181	Naas South	Carnalway	Naas
Harristown Lower	258	Offaly West	Harristown	Athy
Harristown Upper	203	Offaly West	Harristown	Athy
Hartwell Lower	261	South Salt	Kill	Naas
Hartwell Upper	230	South Salt	Kill	Naas
Hawkfield	723	Connell	Morristownbiller	Naas
Haynestown	255	South Salt	Haynestown	Naas
Heath	197	Kilkea and Moone	Tankardstown	Athy
Hempstown Commons	238	Naas North	Rathmore	Naas
Herbertstown	493	Connell	Greatconnell	Naas
Hillfarm	238	Offaly West	Kilrush	Athy
Hillsborough	254	Connell	Greatconnell	Naas
Hobartstown East	287	Kilkea and Moone	Castledermot	Athy
Hobartstown West	422	Kilkea and Moone	Castledermot	Athy
Hodgestown	239	Ikeathy and Oughterany	Clonshanbo	Celbridge
Hodgestown	151	Ikeathy and Oughterany	Kilcock	Celbridge
Hodgestown	628	Clane	Timahoe	Naas
Hoganswood	95	Clane	Clane	Naas
Hoganswood East	6	Clane	Clane	Naas
Horsepasstown	77	Naas South	Ballymore Eustace	Naas
Hortland	1,409	Ikeathy and Oughterany	Scullogestown	Celbridge
Hughstown	752	Kilkea and Moone	Killelan	Baltinglass
Huttonread	233	South Salt	Oughterard	Naas
Hybla (or Ballyneage)	641	Offaly West	Duneany	Athy
Inch	598	Narragh and Reban East	Moone	Athy
Inchanearl	67	Offaly East	Rathangan	Edenderry
Inchaquire	686	Narragh and Reban East	Narraghmore	Athy
Irishtown	517	Kilkea and Moone	Moone	Athy
Irishtown Lower	229	North Salt	Straffan	Celbridge
Irishtown Upper	274	North Salt	Straffan	Celbridge
Ironhills	720	Offaly West	Kilrush	Athy
Jarretstown	47	North Salt	Confey	Celbridge
Jerusalem	288	Kilkea and Moone	Painestown	Athy
Jigginstown	1,038	Naas North	Naas	Naas
Johninstown	224	North Salt	Taghadoe	Celbridge
**Johnstown**	Town	Carbury	Cadamstown	Edenderry
Johnstown	409	Carbury	Cadamstown	Edenderry
Johnstown	178	Naas South	Carnalway	Naas
Johnstown	145	Naas North	Johnstown	Naas
Johnstown North	424	Kilkea and Moone	Castledermot	Athy
Johnstown South	319	Kilkea and Moone	Castledermot	Athy
Kealstown	326	North Salt	Taghadoe	Celbridge
Kearneystown Lower	72	South Salt	Lyons	Celbridge
Kearneystown Upper	79	South Salt	Lyons	Celbridge
Keeloge	137	Offaly East	Rathangan	Naas
Keeloges	133	Naas North	Whitechurch	Naas
Kellystown	212	North Salt	Laraghbryan	Celbridge
Kennycourt	733	Naas South	Gilltown	Naas
Kerdiffstown	703	Naas North	Kerdiffstown	Naas
Kilbeg	83	Offaly West	Ballybrackan	Athy
Kilbelin	288	Connell	Greatconnell	Naas
Kilberry	1,497	Narragh and Reban West	Kilberry	Athy
Kilboggan	171	Offaly West	Kilrush	Athy
Kilbride	206	Ikeathy and Oughterany	Cloncurry	Celbridge
Kilbrook	406	Ikeathy and Oughterany	Cloncurry	Celbridge
**Kilcock**	Town	Ikeathy and Oughterany	Kilcock	Celbridge
Kilcock	378	Ikeathy and Oughterany	Kilcock	Celbridge
Kilcoo	287	Narragh and Reban West	Churchtown	Athy
Kilcrow	357	Narragh and Reban West	Churchtown	Athy
**Kilcullen**	Town	Naas South	Carnalway	Naas
**Kilcullen**	Town	Kilcullen	Kilcullen	Naas
Kilcullenbridge	136	Naas South	Carnalway	Naas
Kilcullenbridge	201	Kilcullen	Kilcullen	Naas
Kildangan	988	Offaly West	Kildangan	Athy
**Kildare**	Town	Offaly East	Kildare	Naas
Kildare	761	Offaly East	Kildare	Naas
Kildoon	410	Offaly West	Nurney	Athy
Kilglass	443	Carbury	Kilrainy	Edenderry
Kilgowan	696	Kilcullen	Kilcullen	Naas
Kilkea Lower	438	Kilkea and Moone	Kilkea	Athy
Kilkea Upper	532	Kilkea and Moone	Kilkea	Athy
Kilkeaskin	990	Carbury	Kilpatrick	Edenderry
**Kill**	Town	South Salt	Kill	Naas
Kill	262	Offaly West	Monasterevin	Athy
Kill East	181	South Salt	Kill	Naas
Kill West	378	South Salt	Kill	Naas
Killadoon	449	North Salt	Killadoon	Celbridge
Killashee	400	Naas South	Killashee	Naas
Killashee	14	Naas North	Killashee	Naas
Killeagh	294	Connell	Kilmeage	Naas
Killeagh Common	1	Offaly East	Grangeclare	Naas
Killeagh Common	4	Offaly East	Kildare	Naas
Killeagh Common	3	Offaly East	Rathangan	Naas
Killeen	542	Narragh and Reban East	Narraghmore	Athy
Killeen East	145	Offaly West	Ballybrackan	Athy
Killeen West	205	Offaly West	Ballybrackan	Athy
Killeenbeg	82	South Salt	Kill	Naas
Killeenlea	107	North Salt	Killadoon	Celbridge
Killeenmore	363	Naas North	Whitechurch	Naas
Killeighter	298	Ikeathy and Oughterany	Cloncurry	Celbridge
Killelan	48	Kilkea and Moone	Killelan	Baltinglass
Killhill	223	South Salt	Kill	Naas
Killickaweeny	495	Ikeathy and Oughterany	Cloncurry	Celbridge
Killinagh	494	Carbury	Nurney	Edenderry
Killinagh Lower	651	Carbury	Kilpatrick	Edenderry
Killinagh Upper	507	Carbury	Kilpatrick	Edenderry
Killinane	474	Kilcullen	Kilcullen	Naas
Killinthomas	1,040	Offaly East	Rathangan	Edenderry
Killybegs	219	Clane	Killybegs	Naas
Killybegs Demesne	274	Clane	Killybegs	Naas
Killyguire	624	Offaly East	Rathangan	Edenderry
Killyon	270	Carbury	Dunfierth	Edenderry
Kilmacredock Lower	209	North Salt	Kilmacredock	Celbridge
Kilmacredock Upper	269	North Salt	Kilmacredock	Celbridge
Kilmagorroge	216	Ikeathy and Oughterany	Cloncurry	Celbridge
Kilmalum	458	Naas South	Tipperkevin	Naas
Kilmead	487	Narragh and Reban East	Narraghmore	Athy
**Kilmeage**	Town	Connell	Kilmeage	Naas
Kilmeage	571	Connell	Kilmeage	Naas
Kilmeage Little	6	Connell	Kilmeage	Naas
Kilmoney North	612	Offaly East	Rathangan	Edenderry
Kilmoney South	453	Offaly East	Rathangan	Naas
Kilmore	711	Carbury	Cadamstown	Edenderry
Kilmore	127	Carbury	Kilmore	Edenderry
Kilmorebrannagh	342	Carbury	Cadamstown	Edenderry
Kilmurry	223	Ikeathy and Oughterany	Donadea	Celbridge
Kilmurry	1,010	Carbury	Dunfierth	Edenderry
Kilmurry	426	Clane	Clane	Naas
Kilnabooley	130	Offaly East	Rathangan	Edenderry
Kilnagornan	254	Offaly East	Kildare	Naas
Kilnamoragh South	426	Ikeathy and Oughterany	Donadea	Celbridge
Kilnamorogh North	158	Ikeathy and Oughterany	Donadea	Celbridge
Kilpatrick	130	Offaly West	Ballybrackan	Athy
Kilpatrick	394	Carbury	Kilpatrick	Edenderry
Kilrainy	523	Carbury	Kilrainy	Edenderry
Kilrathmurry	756	Carbury	Kilrainy	Edenderry
Kilrush	212	Offaly West	Kilrush	Athy
Kilshanchoe	252	Carbury	Dunfierth	Edenderry
Kiltaghan North	306	Offaly East	Rathangan	Edenderry
Kiltaghan South	249	Offaly East	Rathangan	Edenderry
**Kilteel**	Town	South Salt	Kilteel	Naas
Kilteel Lower	259	South Salt	Kilteel	Naas
Kilteel Upper	210	South Salt	Kilteel	Naas
Kilwarden	364	South Salt	Kilteel	Naas
Kilwoghan	110	North Salt	Kildrought	Celbridge
Kimmeens	17	Naas South	Ballymore Eustace	Naas
Kineagh	442	Kilcullen	Kilcullen	Naas
Kingsbog (or Common)	663	Offaly East	Kildare	Naas
Kingsland	108	Narragh and Reban East	Usk	Naas
Kinnafad	626	Carbury	Carrick	Edenderry
Kishawanny Lower	263	Carbury	Kilmore	Edenderry
Kishawanny Upper	333	Carbury	Kilmore	Edenderry
Knavinstown	618	Offaly West	Knavinstown	Athy
Knockanally	511	Ikeathy and Oughterany	Scullogestown	Celbridge
Knockaphuca	82	Kilkea and Moone	Castledermot	Athy
Knockatippaun	140	Naas South	Brannockstown	Naas
Knockaulin	300	Kilcullen	Kilcullen	Naas
Knockbane	113	Kilkea and Moone	Castledermot	Carlow
Knockbounce	158	Kilcullen	Kilcullen	Naas
Knockcor	547	Carbury	Mylerstown	Edenderry
Knockfield	404	Kilkea and Moone	Graney	Baltinglass
Knocknacree	47	Kilkea and Moone	Castledermot	Athy
Knocknacree	271	Kilkea and Moone	Graney	Athy
Knocknagalliagh	285	Offaly East	Kildare	Edenderry
Knocknagee	479	Kilkea and Moone	Ballaghmoon	Athy
Knockpatrick	422	Kilkea and Moone	Graney	Baltinglass
Knockroe	299	Kilkea and Moone	Dunmanoge	Athy
Knockroe	325	Kilkea and Moone	Graney	Baltinglass
Knockshanagh	388	Kilkea and Moone	Graney	Baltinglass
Knockshough Glebe	125	Offaly East	Kildare	Naas
Lackagh Beg	503	Offaly West	Lackagh	Athy
Lackagh More	486	Offaly West	Lackagh	Athy
Lackaghbog	21	Offaly West	Lackagh	Athy
Ladycastle Lower	402	Naas North	Whitechurch	Naas
Ladycastle Lower	402	Naas North	Whitechurch	Naas
Ladycastle Upper	315	Naas North	Whitechurch	Naas
Ladycastle Upper	315	Naas North	Whitechurch	Naas
Ladyhill	155	Naas North	Bodenstown	Naas
Ladyhill	155	Naas North	Bodenstown	Naas
Ladytown	1,147	Connell	Ladytown	Naas
Landenstown	568	Clane	Brideschurch	Naas
Laragh	188	Ikeathy and Oughterany	Kilcock	Celbridge
Laragh Demesne	639	Ikeathy and Oughterany	Kilcock	Celbridge
Laraghbryan East	273	North Salt	Laraghbryan	Celbridge
Laraghbryan West	119	North Salt	Laraghbryan	Celbridge
Larch Hill	119	Offaly West	Ballybrackan	Athy
Lattensbog	194	Connell	Oldconnell	Naas
Leinsterlodge	290	Kilkea and Moone	Tankardstown	Athy
**Leixlip**	Town	North Salt	Leixlip	Celbridge
Leixlip	604	North Salt	Leixlip	Celbridge
Leixlip Demsne	286	North Salt	Leixlip	Celbridge
Lenagorra	184	Offaly West	Harristown	Athy
Levitstown	653	Kilkea and Moone	Dunmanoge	Athy
Levitstown	384	Kilkea and Moone	Tankardstown	Athy
Lewistown	523	Connell	Ladytown	Naas
Lipstown	198	Narragh and Reban East	Narraghmore	Athy
Lipstown Lower	409	Narragh and Reban East	Davidstown	Athy
Lipstown Upper	216	Narragh and Reban East	Davidstown	Athy
Lisbush	123	Kilkea and Moone	Ballaghmoon	Athy
Littleconnell	376	Connell	Oldconnell	Naas
Littlerath	170	Naas North	Bodenstown	Naas
Littletown	175	Connell	Kilmeage	Naas
Lodgefarm	720	Kilkea and Moone	Kilkea	Athy
Lodgepark	233	North Salt	Straffan	Celbridge
Logstown	170	Naas South	Carnalway	Naas
Longstone	170	Naas South	Ballymore Eustace	Naas
Longtown	64	North Salt	Straffan	Celbridge
Longtown Demesne	326	Clane	Killybegs	Naas
Longtown North	124	Clane	Killybegs	Naas
Longtown South	305	Clane	Killybegs	Naas
Loughabor	276	Offaly West	Fontstown	Athy
Loughandys	105	Offaly East	Kildare	Naas
Loughanure Commons	108	Clane	Clane	Naas
Loughbollard Commons	32	Clane	Clane	Naas
Loughbrown	186	Offaly East	Pollardstown	Naas
Loughlinstown	248	South Salt	Donaghcumper	Celbridge
Loughlion	78	Offaly East	Kildare	Naas
Loughminane	101	Offaly East	Kildare	Naas
Loughnacush	189	Carbury	Ardkill	Edenderry
Loughtown	235	Ikeathy and Oughterany	Clonshanbo	Celbridge
Lowtown	743	Narragh and Reban West	Kilberry	Athy
Lowtown	504	Connell	Kilmeage	Naas
Lugadoo	91	Ikeathy and Oughterany	Cloncurry	Celbridge
Lugadowden	78	Naas South	Tipperkevin	Naas
Lughil	275	Offaly West	Ballybrackan	Athy
Lullybeg	2,203	Offaly East	Cloncurry	Edenderry
Lullymore East	1,090	Offaly East	Lullymore	Edenderry
Lullymore West	1,566	Offaly East	Lullymore	Edenderry
Lynamsgarden	125	Narragh and Reban East	Narraghmore	Athy
Lyons	540	South Salt	Lyons	Celbridge
Maddenstown Demesne	200	Offaly East	Ballysax	Naas
Maddenstown Middle	392	Offaly East	Ballysax	Naas
Maddenstown North	368	Offaly East	Ballysax	Naas
Maddenstown South	662	Offaly East	Ballysax	Naas
Maganey Lower	246	Kilkea and Moone	Dunmanoge	Athy
Maganey Upper	14	Kilkea and Moone	Dunmanoge	Athy
Mainham	172	Ikeathy and Oughterany	Mainham	Celbridge
Mariavilla	297	North Salt	Laraghbryan	Celbridge
Marshalstown	353	Kilkea and Moone	Killelan	Baltinglass
Martinstown	53	Offaly East	Ballysax	Athy
Martinstown	374	Offaly East	Ballyshannon	Athy
Martinstown	274	Offaly East	Carn	Athy
Martinstown	150	Offaly East	Tully	Athy
Martinstown	315	Carbury	Cadamstown	Edenderry
Maudlings	361	Naas North	Naas	Naas
Maws	527	North Salt	Laraghbryan	Celbridge
Mayfield (or Ballynagalliagh)	303	Offaly West	Duneany	Athy
**Maynooth**	Town	North Salt	Laraghbryan	Celbridge
Maynooth	483	North Salt	Laraghbryan	Celbridge
Maynooth South	36	North Salt	Laraghbryan	Celbridge
Merville (or Brewel East)	418	Narragh and Reban East	Usk	Naas
Milemill	7	Naas South	Gilltown	Naas
Millfarm	193	Offaly West	Kilrush	Athy
Millfarm	23	Offaly West	Lackagh	Athy
Millicent Demesne	247	Clane	Clane	Naas
Millicent North	97	Clane	Clane	Naas
Millicent South	325	Clane	Clane	Naas
Milltown	460	Narragh and Reban West	Churchtown	Athy
Milltown	378	Connell	Feighcullen	Naas
Moat Commons	22	Clane	Clane	Naas
Moatavanny	217	Kilkea and Moone	Castledermot	Baltinglass
Moatstown	113	Narragh and Reban West	Churchtown	Athy
Monaclaudy	187	Kilkea and Moone	Ballaghmoon	Athy
Monapheeby (or Boherbaun Upper)	374	Offaly West	Harristown	Athy
**Monasterevin**	Town	Offaly West	Monasterevin	Athy
Monasterevin	208	Offaly West	Monasterevin	Athy
Monasterevin Bog	153	Offaly West	Monasterevin	Athy
Monatore	88	Narragh and Reban East	Narraghmore	Athy
Moneycooly	408	North Salt	Laraghbryan	Celbridge
Monread North	299	Naas North	Naas	Naas
Monread South	296	Naas North	Naas	Naas
Moods	383	Clane	Downings	Naas
**Moone**	Town	Kilkea and Moone	Moone	Athy
Moone	2,877	Kilkea and Moone	Moone	Athy
Mooreabbey Demesne	1,267	Offaly West	Monasterevin	Athy
Mooretown	524	Offaly East	Kildare	Naas
Moorfield	437	Connell	Morristownbiller	Naas
Moorhill	225	Naas South	Gilltown	Naas
Moorhill	206	Naas South	Jago	Naas
Moortown	206	North Salt	Kildrought	Celbridge
Moortown	382	Ikeathy and Oughterany	Mainham	Celbridge
Moortown	205	Connell	Ladytown	Naas
Moortown	378	Kilcullen	Tully	Naas
Moortowncastle	372	Kilcullen	Tully	Athy
Morganstown	96	Naas South	Kill	Naas
Morristown	101	South Salt	Forenaghts	Naas
Morristown Little	59	Connell	Oldconnell	Naas
Morristown Lower	200	Connell	Oldconnell	Naas
Morristown Upper	332	Connell	Oldconnell	Naas
Morristownbiller	435	Connell	Morristownbiller	Naas
Mounntarmstrong	368	Ikeathy and Oughterany	Mainham	Celbridge
Mountprospect	249	Offaly East	Rathangan	Edenderry
Mountrice	632	Offaly West	Lackagh	Athy
Mountrice Bog	43	Offaly West	Lackagh	Athy
Moyleabbey	197	Narragh and Reban East	Narraghmore	Baltinglass
Moyvally	1,363	Carbury	Ballynadrumny	Edenderry
Mucklon	739	Carbury	Dunfierth	Edenderry
Mulgeeth	835	Carbury	Dunfierth	Edenderry
Mullacash Middle	265	Naas South	Killashee	Naas
Mullacash North	159	Naas South	Killashee	Naas
Mullacash South	276	Naas South	Killashee	Naas
Mullaghboy	147	Naas South	Carnalway	Naas
Mullaghmoyne East	187	Offaly West	Ballyshannon	Athy
Mullaghmoyne West	201	Offaly West	Ballyshannon	Athy
Mullaghreelan	500	Kilkea and Moone	Kilkea	Athy
Mullaghroe Lower	106	Offaly West	Lackagh	Athy
Mullaghroe Upper	105	Offaly West	Lackagh	Athy
Mullamast	1,451	Kilkea and Moone	Narraghmore	Athy
Mullantine	137	Offaly East	Rathangan	Edenderry
Mullarney	99	Kilkea and Moone	Castledermot	Athy
Mylerstown	244	Offaly West	Harristown	Athy
Mylerstown	499	Carbury	Mylerstown	Edenderry
Mylerstown	338	Naas South	Killashee	Naas
Mylerstown	792	Connell	Rathernan	Naas
Mynagh	101	Offaly West	Lackagh	Athy
Mynagh	50	Offaly West	Rathangan	Athy
**Naas**	Town	Naas North	Naas	Naas
Naas East	524	Naas North	Naas	Naas
Naas West	538	Naas North	Naas	Naas
Narrabeg	202	Kilkea and Moone	Killelan	Baltinglass
Narramore	589	Narragh and Reban East	Narraghmore	Athy
Narramore Demesne	307	Narragh and Reban East	Narraghmore	Athy
Newabbey	293	Naas South	Brannockstown	Naas
**Newbridge**	Town	Connell	Greatconnell	Naas
**Newbridge**	Town	Connell	Morristownbiller	Naas
Newhall	570	Connell	Ladytown	Naas
Newhall	7	Connell	Oldconnell	Naas
Newland North	757	Naas South	Killashee	Naas
Newland South	144	Naas South	Killashee	Naas
Newland West	205	Naas South	Killashee	Naas
Newpark	220	Connell	Kilmeage	Naas
Newrow	70	South Salt	Kilteel	Naas
Newtown	373	Offaly West	Ballyshannon	Athy
Newtown	47	Kilkea and Moone	Castledermot	Athy
Newtown	207	Kilkea and Moone	Killelan	Baltinglass
Newtown	452	Kilkea and Moone	Kineagh	Baltinglass
Newtown	427	Ikeathy and Oughterany	Cloncurry	Celbridge
Newtown	289	South Salt	Donaghcumper	Celbridge
Newtown	347	North Salt	Laraghbryan	Celbridge
Newtown	216	North Salt	Leixlip	Celbridge
Newtown	525	Offaly East	Rathangan	Edenderry
Newtown	267	Offaly East	Kildare	Naas
Newtown	95	South Salt	Kill	Naas
Newtown	206	Naas South	Killashee	Naas
Newtown	74	Naas North	Rathmore	Naas
Newtown	534	Naas North	Tipper	Naas
Newtown	380	Offaly East	Tully	Naas
Newtown Baltracey	102	Naas North	Tipper	Naas
Newtown Great	469	Naas North	Rathmore	Naas
Newtown Little	23	Naas North	Rathmore	Naas
Newtownallen	602	Kilkea and Moone	Ballaghmoon	Athy
Newtownbert	813	Narragh and Reban West	Kilberry	Athy
Newtowndonore	873	Clane	Downings	Naas
Newtownhortland	255	Ikeathy and Oughterany	Scullogestown	Celbridge
Newtownlaragh	86	Ikeathy and Oughterany	Kilcock	Celbridge
Newtownmacabe	324	North Salt	Taghadoe	Celbridge
Newtownmoneenluggagh	128	Ikeathy and Oughterany	Scullogestown	Celbridge
Newtownpark	270	Naas North	Rathmore	Naas
Newtownpilsworth	287	Kilkea and Moone	Dunmanoge	Athy
Nicholastown	962	Kilkea and Moone	Tankardstown	Athy
Nicholastown	538	Ikeathy and Oughterany	Cloncurry	Celbridge
Nicholastown	425	Kilcullen	Kilcullen	Naas
Nunsland	87	Naas North	Rathmore	Naas
**Nurney**	Town	Offaly West	Nurney	Athy
Nurney	258	Offaly West	Nurney	Athy
Nurney	364	Carbury	Nurney	Edenderry
Nurney Bog	147	Offaly West	Nurney	Athy
Nurney Demesne	334	Offaly West	Nurney	Athy
Oakleypark	103	North Salt	Kildrought	Celbridge
Oghil	1,186	Offaly West	Monasterevin	Athy
Oldcarton	288	North Salt	Laraghbryan	Celbridge
Oldconnell	677	Connell	Oldconnell	Naas
Oldcourt	646	Narragh and Reban West	Kilberry	Athy
Oldcourt	361	Carbury	Kilmore	Edenderry
Oldgrange	15	Narragh and Reban East	Fontstown	Athy
Oldgrange	402	Offaly West	Monasterevin	Athy
Oldgrange	363	Narragh and Reban East	Narraghmore	Athy
Oldkilcullen	792	Kilcullen	Kilcullen	Naas
Oldmilltown.	165	South Salt	Kilteel	Naas
Oldtown	251	North Salt	Kildrought	Celbridge
Oldtown	179	Connell	Greatconnell	Naas
Oldtown	169	Naas South	Killashee	Naas
Oldtown	21	South Salt	Kilteel	Naas
Oldtown	134	Naas North	Naas	Naas
Oldtown Demesne	161	Naas North	Naas	Naas
Oldtowndonore	1,015	Clane	Downings	Naas
Osberstown	1,316	Naas North	Naas	Naas
Oughterard	388	South Salt	Oughterard	Naas
Ovidstown	334	Ikeathy and Oughterany	Cloncurry	Celbridge
Ovidstown	54	North Salt	Straffan	Celbridge
Ovidstown	211	North Salt	Taghadoe	Celbridge
Painestown	554	Ikeathy and Oughterany	Balraheen	Celbridge
Painestown	423	South Salt	Kill	Naas
Palmerstown	119	Naas North	Johnstown	Naas
Palmerstown Demesne	691	Naas North	Johnstown	Naas
Parsonstown	126	North Salt	Donaghcumper	Celbridge
Parsonstown	510	Carbury	Ardkill	Edenderry
Passlands	104	Offaly West	Monasterevin	Athy
Paudeenourstown	52	Narragh and Reban West	Kilberry	Athy
Philipstown	175	Naas North	Rathmore	Naas
Piercetown	165	Connell	Morristownbiller	Naas
Pipershall	176	Naas North	Rathmore	Naas
Pitchfordstown	408	Ikeathy and Oughterany	Cloncurry	Celbridge
Ploopluck	153	Naas North	Naas	Naas
Pluckerstown	565	Connell	Kilmeage	Naas
Pluckerstown	346	Offaly East	Kilmeage	Naas
Pluckstown	195	South Salt	Lyons	Celbridge
Plunketstown Lower	295	Kilkea and Moone	Graney	Baltinglass
Plunketstown Upper	342	Kilkea and Moone	Graney	Baltinglass
Pollagorteen	276	Offaly West	Lackagh	Athy
Pollardstown	1,063	Offaly East	Pollardstown	Naas
Portersize	514	Narragh and Reban East	Timolin	Baltinglass
Porterstown	98	South Salt	Kilteel	Naas
Portgloriam	479	Ikeathy and Oughterany	Kilcock	Celbridge
Posseckstown	252	North Salt	Killadoon	Celbridge
Prospect	223	Naas North	Sherlockstown	Naas
**Prosperous**	Town	Clane	Killybegs	Naas
Prumpelstown Lower	286	Kilkea and Moone	Castledermot	Athy
Prumpelstown Upper	218	Kilkea and Moone	Castledermot	Athy
Prusselstown	69	Narragh and Reban West	Kilberry	Athy
Prusselstown	173	Narragh and Reban West	St. Michaels	Athy
Pullagh	208	Offaly West	Harristown	Athy
Punchersgrange	710	Connell	Feighcullen	Naas
Punchestown	52	Naas South	Tipperkevin	Naas
Punchestown Great	323	Naas North	Rathmore	Naas
Punchestown Little	121	Naas North	Rathmore	Naas
Punchestown Lower	467	Naas North	Rathmore	Naas
Punchestown Upper	264	Naas North	Rathmore	Naas
Quinsborough	147	South Salt	Oughterard	Naas
Quinsborough (or Coolsicken)	617	Offaly West	Lackagh	Athy
Quqrry	224	Narragh and Reban West	Churchtown	Athy
Racefield	192	Offaly West	Ballyshannon	Athy
Raheen	157	Ikeathy and Oughterany	Balraheen	Celbridge
Raheen Old	67	Ikeathy and Oughterany	Balraheen	Celbridge
Raheenadeeragh	367	Narragh and Reban West	Churchtown	Athy
Raheens	540	Clane	Carragh	Naas
Rahilla Commons	8	Offaly East	Dunmurry	Naas
Rahilla Commons	11	Offaly East	Kildare	Naas
Rahilla Glebe	506	Offaly East	Kildare	Naas
Rahin	656	Carbury	Carrick	Edenderry
Rahoonbeak	325	Narragh and Reban East	Narraghmore	Athy
Railpark	366	North Salt	Laraghbryan	Celbridge
**Rathagan**	Town	Offaly East	Rathangan	Edenderry
Rathangan	1,004	Offaly East	Rathangan	Edenderry
Rathangan Demesne	561	Offaly East	Rathangan	Edenderry
Rathasker	132	Naas North	Killashee	Naas
Rathasker	167	Naas North	Naas	Naas
Rathbane	447	South Salt	Kilteel	Naas
Rathbride	1,052	Offaly East	Tully	Naas
Rathcoffey Demesne	222	Ikeathy and Oughterany	Balraheen	Celbridge
Rathcoffey North	216	Ikeathy and Oughterany	Balraheen	Celbridge
Rathcoffey South	255	Ikeathy and Oughterany	Balraheen	Celbridge
Rathconnell	374	Offaly West	Fontstown	Athy
Rathconnell Wood	517	Offaly West	Fontstown	Athy
Rathernan	511	Connell	Rathernan	Naas
Rathgorragh	159	South Salt	Kill	Naas
Rathgrumly	210	Narragh and Reban West	Narraghmore	Athy
Rathmore	521	Carbury	Ardkill	Edenderry
Rathmore	417	Naas North	Bodenstown	Naas
Rathmore East	377	Naas North	Rathmore	Naas
Rathmore West	927	Naas North	Rathmore	Naas
Rathmuck	297	Offaly West	Duneany	Athy
Rathsillagh Lower	173	Narragh and Reban East	Fontstown	Athy
Rathsillagh Upper	342	Narragh and Reban East	Fontstown	Athy
Rathstewart	52	Narragh and Reban West	St. Michaels	Athy
Rathwalkin	245	Offaly East	Kildare	Edenderry
Ravensdale	186	North Salt	Laraghbryan	Celbridge
Redbog	459	Naas North	Rathmore	Naas
Redhills	332	Offaly East	Kildare	Edenderry
Reeves	221	South Salt	Donaghcumper	Celbridge
Richardstown	587	Ikeathy and Oughterany	Mainham	Celbridge
Rickardstown	145	Connell	Morristownbiller	Naas
Rickardstown Lower	490	Offaly West	Harristown	Athy
Rickardstown Upper	232	Offaly West	Harristown	Athy
Rinaghan	51	Carbury	Carrick	Edenderry
Rinawade Lower	47	North Salt	Donaghcumper	Celbridge
Rinawade Upper	87	North Salt	Donaghcumper	Celbridge
Riverstown	240	Offaly West	Ballybrackan	Athy
**Robertstown**	Town	Connell	Kilmeage	Naas
Robertstown East	336	Connell	Kilmeage	Naas
Robertstown West	269	Connell	Kilmeage	Naas
Rochestown	113	Naas South	Gilltown	Naas
Rock	188	Offaly West	Kilrush	Athy
Roestown	228	Ikeathy and Oughterany	Kilcock	Celbridge
Roosk	177	North Salt	Taghadoe	Celbridge
Rosberry	1,054	Connell	Morristownbiller	Naas
Rosbran	91	Narragh and Reban West	St. John's	Athy
Roscolvin	191	Kilkea and Moone	Castledermot	Baltinglass
Rosetown	429	Kilkea and Moone	Tankardstown	Athy
Rosetown	416	Connell	Greatconnell	Naas
Roundhills	59	Narragh and Reban West	St. John's	Athy
Rowanstown	130	North Salt	Laraghbryan	Celbridge
Royaloak	362	Carbury	Ballynadrumny	Edenderry
Russellstown	196	Narragh and Reban West	Kilberry	Athy
Russellstown	382	Connell	Rathernan	Naas
Russellswood	151	Carbury	Carrick	Edenderry
Saintjohns	458	Kilkea and Moone	Castledermot	Baltinglass
Salisbury	63	Narragh and Reban West	Kilberry	Athy
**Sallins**	Town	Naas North	Bodenstown	Naas
**Sallins**	Town	Naas North	Naas	Naas
Sallins	206	Naas North	Bodenstown	Naas
Sallymount Demesne	223	Naas South	Brannockstown	Naas
Sawyerswood	206	Narragh and Reban West	Kilberry	Athy
Scarletstown	216	Connell	Morristownbiller	Naas
Seasons	114	Naas South	Ballymore Eustace	Naas
Segravescastle	30	Naas North	Rathmore	Naas
Shamrocklodge	25	Narragh and Reban West	St. John's	Athy
Shanacloon	189	Offaly East	Ballyshannon	Naas
Shanraheen	164	Narragh and Reban West	Kilberry	Athy
Shanrath	6	Narragh and Reban West	St. John's	Athy
Shanrath East	123	Narragh and Reban West	St. Michaels	Athy
Shanrath West	111	Narragh and Reban West	St. Michaels	Athy
Sheean	163	Narragh and Reban West	Churchtown	Athy
Sheean	426	Narragh and Reban West	Kilberry	Athy
Sheean	316	Offaly East	Rathangan	Edenderry
Sheriffhill	393	Kilkea and Moone	Killelan	Baltinglass
Sherlockstown	556	Naas North	Sherlockstown	Naas
Sherlockstown Common	138	Naas North	Sherlockstown	Naas
Sheshoon	316	Offaly East	Ballysax	Naas
Shindala	158	Offaly West	Lackagh	Athy
Shortwood	104	Naas North	Whitechurch	Naas
Sillagh	326	Naas South	Kill	Naas
Silliothill	258	Naas South	Carnalway	Naas
Silliothill	166	Offaly East	Moone	Naas
Silverhill Lower	83	Naas South	Ballymore Eustace	Naas
Silverhill Upper	146	Naas South	Ballymore Eustace	Naas
Simmonstown	300	South Salt	Donaghcumper	Celbridge
Simonstown East	62	Kilkea and Moone	Killelan	Baltinglass
Simonstown West	413	Kilkea and Moone	Killelan	Baltinglass
Sion	164	North Salt	Laraghbryan	Celbridge
Skeagh	65	South Salt	Lyons	Celbridge
Skenagun	222	Kilkea and Moone	Castledermot	Baltinglass
Skerries North	506	Narragh and Reban West	Narraghmore	Athy
Skerries South	301	Narragh and Reban West	Narraghmore	Athy
Skirteen	89	Offaly West	Monasterevin	Athy
Slate Quarries	18	Naas South	Tipperkevin	Naas
Slatequarries	143	Naas North	Rathmore	Naas
Slieveroe	282	Naas South	Tipperkevin	Naas
Smallford	351	Narragh and Reban West	Kilberry	Athy
Smithstown	232	North Salt	Taghadoe	Celbridge
Snugburrow	225	Kilkea and Moone	Tankardstown	Athy
Sousheen Common	7	Naas South	Ballymore Eustace	Naas
Southgreen	30	Offaly East	Kildare	Naas
Southgreen	264	Offaly East	Tully	Naas
Spratstown	319	Narragh and Reban East	Narraghmore	Baltinglass
Srowland	121	Narragh and Reban West	Kilberry	Athy
St Catherines	25	North Salt	Confey	Celbridge
St Catherines Park	799	North Salt	Leixlip	Celbridge
St. Wolstans	110	South Salt	Donaghcumper	Celbridge
Stacumny	155	South Salt	Stacumny	Celbridge
Stacumny Cottage	135	South Salt	Stacumny	Celbridge
Staplestown	625	Clane	Ballynafagh	Naas
Stephenstown North	252	Naas South	Killashee	Naas
Stephenstown South	236	Naas South	Killashee	Naas
Stickins	279	Clane	Carragh	Naas
Straffan	215	North Salt	Straffan	Celbridge
Straffan Demesne	214	North Salt	Straffan	Celbridge
Straleek	9	South Salt	Donaghcumper	Celbridge
Stramillian	106	Offaly West	Monasterevin	Athy
Strawhall	40	Offaly East	Kildare	Naas
Suncroft	81	Offaly East	Carn	Naas
Sunnyhill	394	Kilcullen	Kilcullen	Naas
Swordlestown North	549	Naas South	Kill	Naas
Swordlestown South	476	Naas South	Kill	Naas
Taghadoe	506	North Salt	Taghadoe	Celbridge
Tanderagee	190	Carbury	Mylerstown	Edenderry
Tankardsgarden	507	Connell	Oldconnell	Naas
Tankardstwon	331	Kilkea and Moone	Kineagh	Baltinglass
Tawnrush	223	Offaly West	Kilrush	Athy
Teelough	128	Carbury	Kilmore	Edenderry
**Temple Place**	Town	South Salt	Donaghcumper	Celbridge
Thomastown	396	Kilcullen	Tully	Athy
Thomastown	566	Carbury	Cadamstown	Edenderry
Thomastown	148	Clane	Carragh	Naas
Thomastown East	583	Offaly East	Thomastown	Edenderry
Thomastown West	270	Offaly East	Thomastown	Edenderry
Thornberry	159	South Salt	Kill	Naas
Thornhill	45	North Salt	Kildrought	Celbridge
Ticknevin	2,335	Carbury	Kilpatrick	Edenderry
Timahoe East	2,193	Clane	Timahoe	Naas
Timahoe West	795	Clane	Timahoe	Naas
Timard	129	North Salt	Laraghbryan	Celbridge
**Timolin**	Town	Narragh and Reban East	Timolin	Baltinglass
Timolin	1,102	Narragh and Reban East	Timolin	Baltinglass
Tinnakill	229	Narragh and Reban West	Narraghmore	Athy
Tinnycross	67	Naas South	Ballymore Eustace	Naas
Tippeenan Lower	185	Offaly West	Fontstown	Athy
Tippeenan Upper	185	Offaly West	Fontstown	Athy
Tipper East	249	Naas North	Tipper	Naas
Tipper North	176	Naas North	Tipper	Naas
Tipper South	433	Naas North	Tipper	Naas
Tipper West	173	Naas North	Tipper	Naas
Tipperkevin	278	Naas South	Tipperkevin	Naas
Tipperstown	99	South Salt	Castledillon	Celbridge
Tirmoghan Common	46	Ikeathy and Oughterany	Cloncurry	Celbridge
Tobercocka	88	Offaly West	Lackagh	Athy
Toberogan	154	Kilcullen	Kilcullen	Naas
Toberton	131	Naas North	Johnstown	Naas
Toghereen	152	Offaly West	Lackagh	Athy
Togherorymore	143	Offaly West	Lackagh	Athy
Tomard	413	Narragh and Reban West	Kilberry	Athy
Tonaphuca (or Flemingtown South)	448	Naas South	Killashee	Naas
Tonlegee	71	Narragh and Reban West	St. John's	Athy
Toolestown	186	North Salt	Taghadoe	Celbridge
Townparks	95	Kilkea and Moone	Castledermot	Athy
Townparks	128	Narragh and Reban West	Churchtown	Athy
Townparks	118	Narragh and Reban West	St. Michaels	Athy
Treadstown	195	North Salt	Laraghbryan	Celbridge
Tuckmilltown	245	South Salt	Oughterard	Naas
Tully East	1,166	Offaly East	Tully	Naas
Tully West	624	Offaly East	Tully	Naas
Tullygorey	198	Narragh and Reban West	Kilberry	Athy
Tullylost	452	Offaly East	Rathangan	Edenderry
Turnerstown	131	Narragh and Reban East	Moone	Athy
Turnings	52	Naas North	Whitechurch	Naas
Turnings Lower	523	Naas North	Whitechurch	Naas
Turnings Upper	278	Naas North	Whitechurch	Naas
Tyrrellstown	259	Narragh and Reban West	Kilberry	Athy
Ummeras Beg	162	Offaly West	Lackagh	Athy
Ummeras More	595	Offaly West	Lackagh	Athy
Usk	565	Narragh and Reban East	Usk	Naas
Usk Little	53	Narragh and Reban East	Usk	Naas
Walshestown	667	Connell	Greatconnell	Naas
Walshestown	106	Naas North	Rathmore	Naas
Walshestown	160	Naas South	Tipperkevin	Naas
Walterstown	1,039	Offaly West	Walterstown	Athy
Walterstown	324	Naas South	Carnalway	Naas
Walterstown Lower	265	Offaly West	Walterstown	Athy
Watergrange	368	Offaly East	Grangeclare	Edenderry
Waterstown	438	Clane	Brideschurch	Naas
Westown	155	Naas North	Johnstown	Naas
Wevil	23	Offaly West	Ballyshannon	Athy
Wheatfield Lower	204	South Salt	Castledillon	Celbridge
Wheatfield Upper	136	South Salt	Castledillon	Celbridge
Wheelam	417	Connell	Feighcullen	Naas
Whitechurch	72	Naas North	Whitechurch	Naas
Whitehouse	223	Offaly West	Fontstown	Athy
Whiteleas	129	Naas South	Ballybought	Naas
Whitesland East	111	Offaly East	Kildare	Naas
Whitesland West	143	Offaly East	Kildare	Naas
Williamstown	376	Carbury	Nurney	Edenderry
Willsgrove	81	Narragh and Reban West	Kilberry	Athy
Windgates	331	North Salt	Taghadoe	Celbridge
Windmill	282	Carbury	Kilmore	Edenderry
Wolfestown	452	Naas North	Rathmore	Naas
Woodlands East	398	Kilkea and Moone	Castledermot	Athy
Woodlands West	389	Kilkea and Moone	Castledermot	Athy
Woodstock North	231	Narragh and Reban West	Churchtown	Athy
Woodstock North	225	Narragh and Reban West	Churchtown	Athy
Yellowbogcommon	289	Kilcullen	Kilcullen	Naas
Yeomanstown	426	Clane	Carragh	Naas
Youngstown	304	Narragh and Reban West	Narraghmore	Athy
