= Grange (surname) =

Grange or Grangé is a French surname that may refer to the following people:

- Adenike Grange, Nigerian paediatrician
- Claude Grange (1883–1971), French sculptor
- David Grange (disambiguation) – multiple people
- Edward Grange (1892–1988), Canadian aviator
- François-Cyrille Grange (born 1983), French alpine skier
- Garland Grange (1906–1981), American football player
- Gleneve Grange (born 1995), Jamaican athlete
- Henri Grange (born 1934), French Olympic basketball player
- Jacques Grange (born 1944), French interior designer
- Jean-Christophe Grangé (born 1961), French mystery writer, journalist, and screenwriter
- Jean-Baptiste Grange (born 1984), French alpine skier
- Kenneth Grange (1929–2024), British industrial designer
- Leslie Grange (1894–1980), New Zealand geologist, soil scientist and scientific administrator
- Lucie Grange (1839-1908), French medium, newspaper editor
- Philip Grange (born 1956), English composer
- Red Grange (1903–1991), American football player
- Rob Grange (born 1950), American rock bass guitarist
- Romain Grange (born 1988), French football player

== See also ==
- La Grange (disambiguation)
