= General Grange =

General Grange may refer to:

- David E. Grange Jr. (1925–2022), U.S. Army lieutenant general
- David L. Grange (born 1947), U.S. Army major general

== See also ==
- Pieter le Grange (born 1916), South African Air Force lieutenant general
