= Newgrange (disambiguation) =

Newgrange is a Neolithic prehistoric site in County Meath, Ireland.

Newgrange or New Grange or variation, may also refer to:

- "Newgrange" (song), a 1982 song by 'Clannad' off the album Magical Ring
- "Newgrange (Bru Na Boinne)" (song), a song by 'Wolfe Tones'; see 25th Anniversary (Wolfe Tones album)
- Newgrange dog, a prehistoric Neolithic breed of dog known from archaeological evidence
- Newgrange School, Hopewell, New Jersey, USA
- New Grange, a locality in Tobago, Trinidad and Tobago

== See also ==
- "Bethel/New Grange", an electoral district in Tobago
- Grange (disambiguation)
- Oldgrange (disambiguation)
