= The Grange =

The Grange may refer to:

== Places ==
=== Australia ===
- Grange, Queensland, a suburb of Brisbane, Queensland, often referred to as The Grange
- The Grange, home of Charles Sturt in Grange, South Australia
- The Grange, Coburg, a heritage-listed house in Melbourne, Victoria
- The Grange, Windsor, a heritage-listed house in Brisbane, Queensland

=== Canada ===
- The Grange, Edmonton, a neighbourhood in the city of Edmonton, Canada
- The Grange (Toronto), a section of the Art Gallery of Ontario

=== United Kingdom ===
- The Grange, Beeston, a Grade II listed building in Nottinghamshire
- The Grange, Cawood, a Grade II* listed house in North Yorkshire
- The Grange, Chalfont St Peter, a former country house in Buckinghamshire
- The Grange, Edinburgh, a residential suburb of Edinburgh, Scotland
- The Grange (Kensington), a former military installation in Liverpool
- The Grange, Monmouth, three attached Grade II listed buildings in Monmouthshire, Wales
- The Grange, Northington, a 19th-century country house in Hampshire
- The Grange, Ramsgate, a 19th-century house in Kent, designed by architect Augustus Pugin as his home
- The Grange Club, a cricket ground in the Stockbridge district of Edinburgh, Scotland

=== United States ===
- The Grange (Lincoln, Massachusetts), an 18th-century home, also called Codman House
- The Grange (New York City), a national memorial site and former home of Alexander Hamilton
- The Grange (Paris, Kentucky), an 18th-century home built for slave trader Ned Stone
- The Grange Estate, an 18-century house in Havertown, Pennsylvania

== Organizations ==
- National Grange ("The Grange"), an agricultural and social organization in the United States

== See also ==
- Grange (disambiguation)
