= Lagrange (surname) =

Lagrange, la Grange or La Grange (French: topographic name for someone who lived by a granary) is a French surname that may refer to

- La Grange (actor) (1635–1692), French actor
- Étienne de La Grange (died 1388), French politician
- Anne-Marie Lagrange, (1962-) French astronomer
- Georges Lagrange (1928–2004), translator to and writer in Esperanto
- Georges Lagrange (bishop) (1929–2014), French Catholic bishop
- Henri Albert de La Grange d'Arquien (1613–1707), French nobility
- Henri Lagrange - Action Française activist
- Henry-Louis de La Grange (1924–2017), French musicologist
- Joseph Lagrange (soldier) (1763–1836), French infantry general
- Joseph-Louis Lagrange (1736–1813), mathematician and astronomer
- Ken La Grange (1923–2001), South African boxer
- Kyla La Grange (born 1986), English singer and songwriter
- Léo Lagrange (1900–1940), French minister
- Louis André Lagrange (1804–1861), French naval commissioner, twice acting governor of Martinique
- Magdelaine de La Grange (1641–1679), French fortune-teller involved in the Affair of the Poisons
- Marcus la Grange (born 1977), South African sprinter
- Marie-Joseph Lagrange (1855–1938), Catholic priest in the Dominican Order
- Nicolas La Grange (1707–1767), French playwright and translator
- Oscar Hugh La Grange (1837–1915), Union Army colonel in the American Civil War
- Pierre Lagrange (born 1962), Belgian hedge fund manager
- Reginald Garrigou-Lagrange (1877–1964), Dominican Thomist theologian and philosopher
- René de Béthoulat de La Grange-Fromenteau, governor of Saint-Christophe, 1638-39
- Zelda La Grange (born 1970), secretary to the South African President Nelson Mandela

== See also ==
- Le Grange (disambiguation)
- Grange (surname)
