= Pieter le Grange =

Lieutenant General Pieter A. Le Grange SSA SM
- Born: 15 September 1916
- Relatives: Cornelia "Nelie" Bester van Rooy
- Military career
- Allegiance: South Africa
- Branch: South African Air Force
- Rank: Lieutenant General
- Commands: Chief of Staff Personnel
- Wars: World War II; Korean War
- Awards: Star of South Africa SSAG Southern Cross Medal SM Korea Medal (South Africa) Union Medal 1939–45 Star Africa Star War Medal 1939–1945 Africa Service Medal (WWII) Bronze Star Medal United Nations Service Medal Korean War Service Medal Order of Military Merit (무공훈장)

Lieutenant General Pieter Andries Le Grange SSA SM (born 15 September 1916) was a South African Air Force officer, who served as Chief of Staff Personnel from 1974 to 1977.

== Air Force career ==
Le Grange joined the South African Air Defence Force in 1937, after a short stint in the Special Service Battalion, and participated in World War II by serving as Adjutant 2 Squadron in Italy and in Sicily. Adjutant 2 Squadron in the Korean War. In 1974, he acted as Director General Personnel. Chief of Staff Personnel from 1 May 1974–30 Sep 1977 on which date he retired.

== Awards and decorations ==
- Star of South Africa (Gold) (SSAG)
- Southern Cross Medal (1952) (SM)
- Korea Medal (South Africa)
- Union Medal
- 1939–45 Star
- Africa Star
- War Medal 1939–1945
- Africa Service Medal (WWII)
- Bronze Star Medal
- United Nations Service Medal (Korea)
- Korean War Service Medal
- Order of Military Merit (무공훈장) (2nd Class - Eulji Cordon (을지)) (Note: Sometimes spelt Ulchi)

== Notes ==
Military offices
Preceded by Lt Gen Hendrik Laubscher	Chief of Staff Personnel; 1974–1977	Succeeded by V Adm Ronald A. Edwards
