= Lagrangian =

Lagrangian may refer to:

== Mathematics ==
- Lagrangian function, used to solve constrained minimization problems in optimization theory; see Lagrange multiplier
  - Lagrangian relaxation, the method of approximating a difficult constrained problem with an easier problem having an enlarged feasible set
  - Lagrangian dual problem, the problem of maximizing the value of the Lagrangian function, in terms of the Lagrange-multiplier variable; See Dual problem
- Lagrangian, a functional whose extrema are to be determined in the calculus of variations
- Lagrangian submanifold, a class of submanifolds in symplectic geometry
- Lagrangian system, a pair consisting of a smooth fiber bundle and a Lagrangian density

== Physics ==
- Lagrangian mechanics, a formulation of classical mechanics
  - Lagrangian (mechanics), a fundamental function of this formulation
- Lagrangian (field theory), a formalism in classical field theory
- Lagrangian point, a position in an orbital configuration of two large bodies
- Lagrangian coordinates, a way of describing the motions of particles of a solid or fluid in continuum mechanics
- Lagrangian coherent structure, distinguished surfaces of trajectories in a dynamical system

== See also ==
- Joseph-Louis Lagrange (1736–1813), Italian mathematician and astronomer
- Lagrange (disambiguation)
- List of things named after Joseph-Louis Lagrange
