= Grange Academy =

Grange Academy or The Grange Academy may refer to:

- The Grange Academy, Bushey, a secondary school located in Hertfordshire, England
- Grange Academy, Kempston, a special school located in Bedfordshire, England
- Grange Academy, Kilmarnock, a secondary school located in Ayrshire, Scotland
- The Grange Academy, Runcorn, a secondary school located in Cheshire, England

== See also ==
- Grange School (disambiguation)
