= David Grange =

David Grange may refer to:

- David E. Grange Jr. (1925–2022), U.S. Army lieutenant general
- David L. Grange (born 1947), U.S. Army brigadier general, son of David E. Grange, Jr.
