= Naas South =

Barony (administrative area) in County Kildare, Ireland

Naas South An Nás Theas (Irish)
- Barony
- Interactive map of Naas South
- Sovereign state: Ireland
- County: Kildare

Area
  - Total: 111.2 km^{2} (42.9 sq mi)

Naas South (Irish: An Nás Theas) is a barony in County Kildare, Ireland.

== Etymology ==
Naas South derives its name from the town of Naas (Irish Nás na Ríogh, "assembly-place of the kings").

== Location ==
Naas South barony is located in east County Kildare, containing part of the upper Liffey valley and the western foothills of the Wicklow Mountains.

== History ==
These were part of the ancient lands of the Ó Broin (O'Byrnes) before the 13th century, retaken in the 14th. There was originally a single Naas barony, divided into north and south baronies before 1603.

== List of settlements ==
Below is a list of settlements in Naas South:

- Ballymore Eustace
