= Naas North =

Barony (administrative area) in County Kildare, Ireland

Naas North An Nás Thuaidh (Irish)
- Barony
- Interactive map of Naas North
- Sovereign state: Ireland
- County: Kildare

Area
  - Total: 103.52 km^{2} (39.97 sq mi)

Naas North (Irish: An Nás Thuaidh) is a barony in County Kildare, Ireland.

== Etymology ==
Naas North derives its name from the town of Naas (Irish Nás na Ríogh, "assembly-place of the kings").

== Location ==
Naas North barony is located in northeast County Kildare, south and east of the Liffey.

== History ==
These were part of the ancient lands of the Uí Broin (O'Byrnes) before the 13th century, retaken in the 14th. The Uí Ceallaig Cualann (O'Kelly) were also noted early in the eastern section. An Uí Fhionáin (O'Finan) sept is noted in the north part of this barony. There was originally a single Naas barony, divided into north and south baronies before 1603.

== List of settlements ==
Below is a list of settlements in Naas North:

- Eadestown
- Naas
- Rathmore
- Sallins
