= Lucie Grange =

- Born: Lucie Poujoulat; 1839; Saint-Étienne, France
- Died: 31 December 1908 (aged 69); Paris, France
- Occupations: medium; feminist prophet; magazine founder; writer
- Spouse: Adolphe Grange (d. 1886)
- Writing career
- Pen name: Habimélah
- Language: French
- Notable work: La Lumière

Lucie Anne Grange (née Poujoulat; 1839 - 31 December 1908) was a French medium and feminist prophet, her mystic name being Habimélah. She was the founder and editor of a monthly spiritualist journal, La Lumière.

== Biography ==
Lucie Poujoulat was born in 1839, in Saint-Étienne. During the Second French Empire, she was a Republican and her husband, Adolphe Grange, was a freemason. Both joined the spiritist movement in 1876, and in 1882, founded the monthly paper, La Lumière, a type of Republican spiritist publication. Advertised as a journal set on covering spiritualism in all its aspects, it boasted that highly competent writers contributed to its pages. Readers could not become subscribers but could join a "knighthood" offering free subscriptions to the publication for those who were not able to pay. She was part of the governing body of the "Societe de Librairie Spirte". Grange also wrote articles for La Lumière, such as "Dathan de Saint-Cyr, Publiciste, Poète, Explorateur." (February, 1904).

After she was widowed in April 1886, Grange became a medium and created her own movement, a kind of religion for the communion of love based on fluidic energy. She then declared herself a prophet and affirmed that Mary, Moses, and Saint John had called her "Lumière" (Light) and charged her with guiding men using the mystic name, "Habimelah", or shortened to "Hab".

Grange saw the poet Virgil very distinctly, and published this account in the 25 September 1884 issue of her magazine:—"Virgil, crowned with laurels. A strong face, rather long, prominent nose with a lump on one side, dark grey eyes, dark brown hair. He is clothed in a long robe. Virgil has the appearance of a strong healthy man. As he appeared to me he repeated the Latin line: 'Tu Marcellus eris'." She believed in the coming of a "new Eve" responsible for restoring her primitive androgenism to God, and she campaigned for women's rights. She died 31 December 1908, in Paris.
