= Grange School =

Grange School may refer to:

- The Grange School, Aylesbury, Buckinghamshire, England
- The Grange School, Northwich, Cheshire, England
- The Grange School, Santiago, Chile
- The Grange School, Christchurch, Dorset, England
- Grange School, Ikeja, Lagos, Nigeria

== See also ==
- Grange Academy (disambiguation)
