= 1939–1945 Star =

United Kingdom military campaign medal for service in the Second World War

The 1939–1945 Star
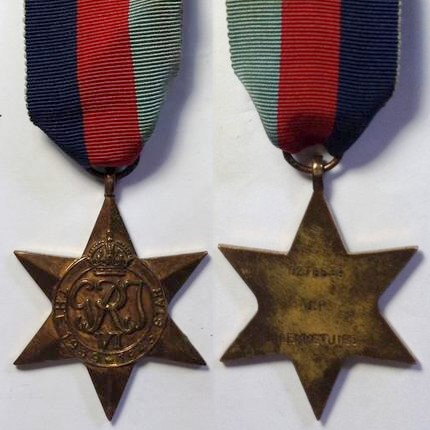
- Awarded to a South African, C276539 J.P. Lemmetjies
- Type: Military campaign medal
- Awarded for: 180 days of operational service or 60 days of operational flying
- Country: United Kingdom
- Presented by: the Monarch of the United Kingdom and the Dominions of the British Commonwealth, and Emperor of India
- Eligibility: All ranks
- Campaign: Second World War
- Clasps: Battle of Britain; Bomber Command
- Established: 8 July 1943
- First award: 1943
- Clasps Ribbon bar Rosettes for the Battle of Britain Bomber Command

Order of wear
- Next (higher): India General Service Medal (1936)
- Next (lower): Atlantic Star

The 1939–1945 Star is a military campaign medal instituted by the United Kingdom on 8 July 1943 for award to British and Commonwealth forces for service in the Second World War. Two clasps were instituted to be worn on the medal ribbon: Battle of Britain and Bomber Command.

== The Second World War Stars ==
On 8 July 1943, the 1939–43 Star (later named the 1939–1945 Star) and the Africa Star became the first two campaign stars instituted, and by May 1945 a total of eight stars and nine clasps had been established by the United Kingdom to reward campaign service during the Second World War. One more campaign star, the Arctic Star, and one more clasp, the Bomber Command Clasp, were belatedly added on 26 February 2013, more than 67 years after the end of the war.

Including the Arctic Star and the Bomber Command clasp, no-one could be awarded more than six campaign stars, with five of the ten clasps awarded denoting service that would have qualified for a second star. Only one clasp could be worn on any one campaign star. The maximum of six possible stars are the following:

- The 1939–1945 Star with, when awarded, either the Battle of Britain or the Bomber Command clasp
- Only one of the Atlantic Star, Air Crew Europe Star or France and Germany Star; those earning more than one received the first qualified for, with the second denoted by the appropriate ribbon clasp
- The Arctic Star
- The Africa Star with, if awarded, the first to be earned of clasps for North Africa 1942–43, 8th Army or 1st Army
- Either the Pacific Star or Burma Star; those earning both received the first qualified for, with the appropriate clasp to represent the second
- The Italy Star

All recipients of campaign stars also received the War Medal.

== Institution ==
The institution of the 1939–43 Star (later named the 1939–1945 Star) was announced on 8 July 1943 and, in August, it was announced that the first uniform ribbon bars would be issued to qualifying personnel later that year. The medals themselves were not intended to be available until after the cessation of hostilities. Some ribbon issues to overseas troops were delayed, but many had been received by the end of 1943 and were worn by recipients throughout the remainder of the war. By March 1944, 1,600,000 personnel had received 1939–1943 Star ribbon bars, with further awards made by the end of the war.

The 1939–1945 Star was awarded for operational service between 3 September 1939 and 2 September 1945, and was the only campaign star that covered the full duration of the Second World War. Two clasps were instituted to be worn on the medal ribbon, along with rosettes to be worn on the ribbon bar of the medal to denote the award of a clasp:

- The Battle of Britain Clasp was instituted in 1945 for award to air crew members on fighter aircraft who took part in the Battle of Britain from 10 July to 31 October 1940. A total of 2,936 airmen qualified for the clasp. A silver-gilt rosette, worn on the ribbon bar, denotes the award of this clasp.
- The Bomber Command Clasp was belatedly instituted on 26 February 2013, for award to air crew members on aircraft who participated in at least one operational sortie in a Royal Air Force Bomber Command operational unit between 3 September 1939 and 8 May 1945 inclusive. A silver rosette worn on the ribbon bar denotes the award of this clasp.

== Award criteria ==
=== Broad criteria ===
The 1939–1945 Star was awarded for specified periods of operational service overseas between 3 September 1939 and either 8 May 1945 in Europe or 2 September 1945 in the Far East theatre. The broad criteria were 180 days of service between these dates, with more specific criteria depending on service arm.

- Naval personnel qualified after 180 days afloat between certain specified dates in areas of operations as laid out in the regulations.
- Army personnel had to complete 180 days of service in an operational command.
- Airborne troops qualified if they had participated in any airborne operations and had completed 60 days of service in a fully operational unit.
- Air Force air crew qualified after 60 days of service in an operational unit, including at least one operational sortie. The 1939–1945 Star was also awarded to crews of transport aircraft who flew over certain specified routes. Air crew of fighter aircraft engaged in the Battle of Britain were also awarded the Battle of Britain Clasp, while air crew of bomber aircraft who participated in at least one operational sortie in a Bomber Command operational unit were awarded the Bomber Command Clasp in 2013.
- Ground crew and other Air force personnel qualified upon completion of 180 days of service in an area of operational army command.
- Merchant Navy personnel qualified upon completion of 180 days of service with at least one voyage made through an operational area.

=== Special criteria ===
The award of a gallantry medal or Mention in Dispatches qualified the recipient for the award of the 1939–1945 Star, regardless of service duration. Personnel whose qualifying service period was terminated prematurely by their death or disability due to service were awarded this Star.

In addition, some special criteria applied when, at certain specified times, just one day's service was required. These latter instances were actions for which a more specific campaign medal was not awarded and the regulations for award made provision for a number of operations in Europe, the Middle East, the Pacific Theatre and India and Burma, in which entry into operational service for one day or part thereof qualified personnel for the award of the 1939–1945 Star. Some notable examples are:

- The Battle of France in France or Belgium from 10 May to 19 June 1940
- The St Nazaire Raid from 22 to 28 March 1942
- The Dieppe Raid on 19 August 1942
- The Anglo-Iraqi War in Iraq from 10 April to 25 May 1941
- The Japanese conquest of Burma from 22 February 1942 to 15 May 1942
- The Battle of Madagascar to capture Vichy French-controlled Madagascar from 5 May 1942 to 5 November 1942

In the case of personnel in operational service at the end of active hostilities in Europe on 8 May 1945, the actual operational service requirement period for the award of the Atlantic Star, Air Crew Europe Star, Italy Star and France and Germany Star was reduced to entry into a theatre of operations and the prior six or two months service requirements did not apply. The 1939–1945 Star, however, was not awarded in any of these cases in which actual operational service amounted to less than six or two months.

== Description ==
The set of nine campaign stars was designed by the Royal Mint engravers. The stars all have a ring suspender which passes through an eyelet formed above the uppermost point of the star. They are six–pointed stars, struck in yellow copper zinc alloy to fit into a 44 millimetres diameter circle, with a maximum width of 38 millimetres and 50 millimetres high from the bottom point of the star to the top of the eyelet.

=== Obverse ===
The obverse has a central design of the Royal Cypher "GRI VI", surmounted by a crown. A circlet, the top of which is covered by the crown, surrounds the cypher and is inscribed "The 1939–1945 Star".

=== Reverse ===
The reverse is plain.

=== Naming ===
The British Honours Committee decided that Second World War campaign medals awarded to British forces would be issued unnamed, a policy applied by all but three British Commonwealth countries. The recipient's name was impressed on the reverse of the stars awarded to Indians, South Africans and, after a campaign led by veteran organisations, to Australians. In the case of South Africans and Australians, this consisted of the recipient's force number, initials and surname in block capitals, with awards to Indians also showing the service arm or corps.

=== Clasps ===
Battle of Britain Clasp

Bomber Command Clasp

Both clasps were struck in bronze and have a frame with an inside edge which resembles the perforated edge of a postage stamp. They are inscribed "Battle of Britain" and "Bomber Command" respectively and were designed to be sewn onto the medal's ribbon. The rosettes, to be worn on the ribbon bar when medals are not worn, are silver-gilt for the Battle of Britain Clasp and silver for the Bomber Command Clasp.

=== Ribbon ===
The ribbon is 32 millimetres wide, with equal width bands of Navy blue, Army red and Air Force blue, with the dark blue band representing the Naval Forces and the Merchant Navy, the red band the Armies and the light blue band the Air Forces. The equal width bands represent the equal contributions of the three service arms towards victory.

The ribbons for this medal and the Defence Medal as well as those of the other Second World War campaign stars, with the exception of the Arctic Star, were devised by King George VI.

== Order of wear ==
The order of wear of the Second World War campaign stars was determined by their respective campaign start dates and by the campaign's duration. This is the order worn, even when a recipient qualified for them in a different order. The Defence Medal and War Medal are worn after the stars. The Canadian Volunteer Service Medal is worn after the Defence Medal and before the War Medal, with other Commonwealth war medals worn after the War Medal.

- The 1939–1945 Star, from 3 September 1939 to 2 September 1945, the full duration of the Second World War
- The Atlantic Star from 3 September 1939 to 8 May 1945, the duration of the Battle of the Atlantic and the War in Europe
- The Arctic Star, from 3 September 1939 to 8 May 1945, the duration of the Arctic Convoys and the War in Europe
- The Air Crew Europe Star, from 3 September 1939 to 5 June 1944, the period until D-Day minus one
- The Africa Star, from 10 June 1940 to 12 May 1943, the duration of the North African Campaign
- The Pacific Star, from 8 December 1941 to 2 September 1945, the duration of the Pacific War
- The Burma Star, from 11 December 1941 to 2 September 1945, the duration of the Burma Campaign
- The Italy Star, from 11 June 1943 to 8 May 1945, the duration of the Italian Campaign
- The France and Germany Star, from 6 June 1944 to 8 May 1945, the duration of the North-West Europe Campaign
- The Defence Medal, from 3 September 1939 to 8 May 1945 (2 September 1945 for those serving in the Far East and the Pacific), the duration of the Second World War
- The War Medal, from 3 September 1939 to 2 September 1945, the full duration of the Second World War

The 1939–1945 Star is therefore worn as shown:

Order of wear
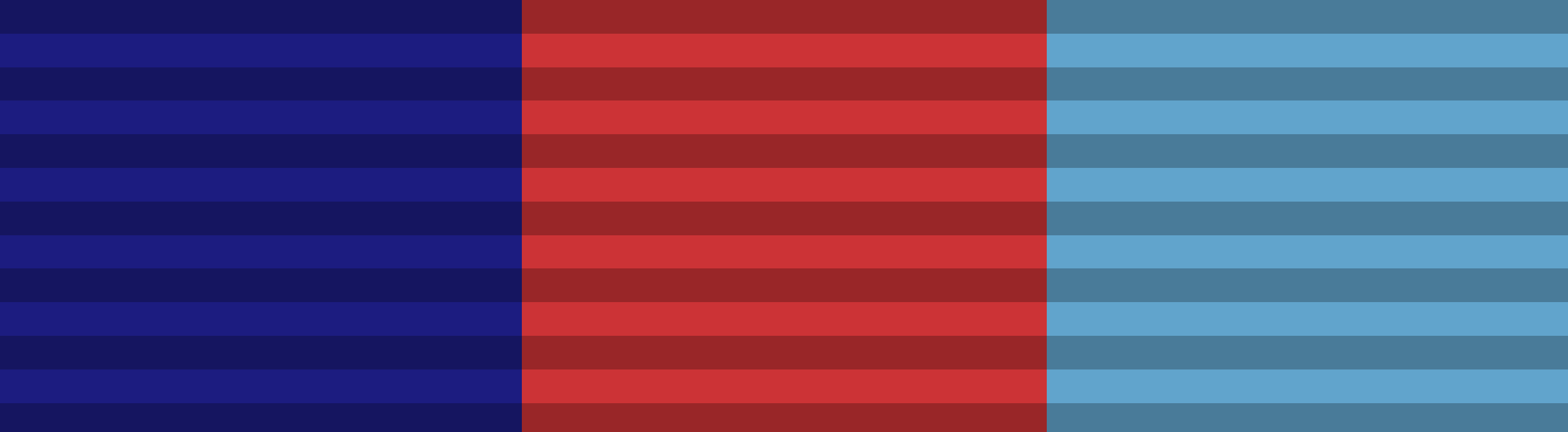
1939–1945 Star

Atlantic Star

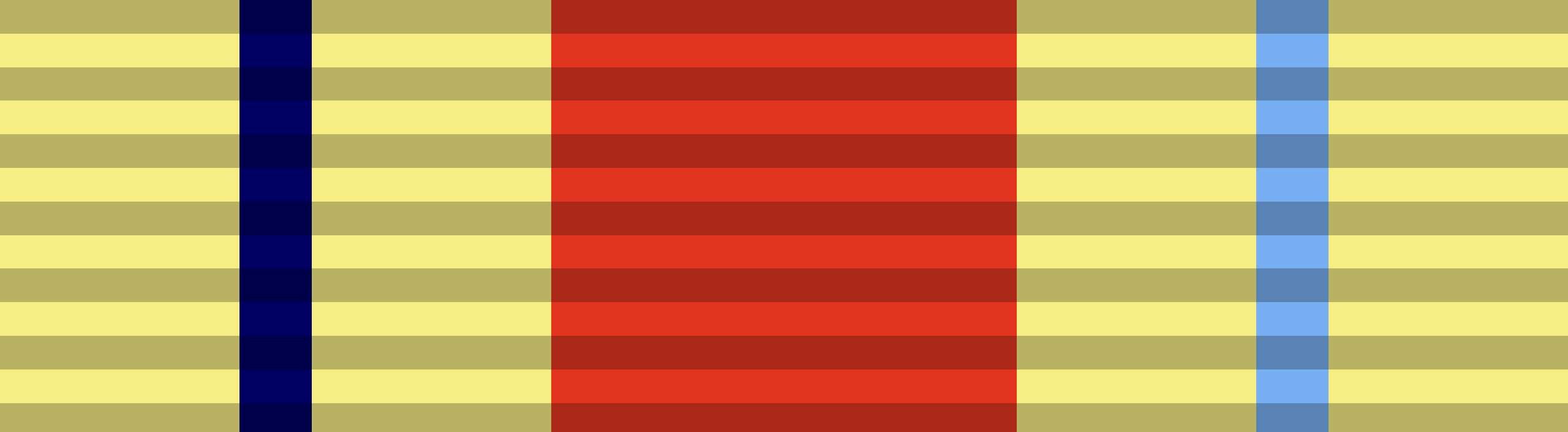
Africa Star

Burma Star

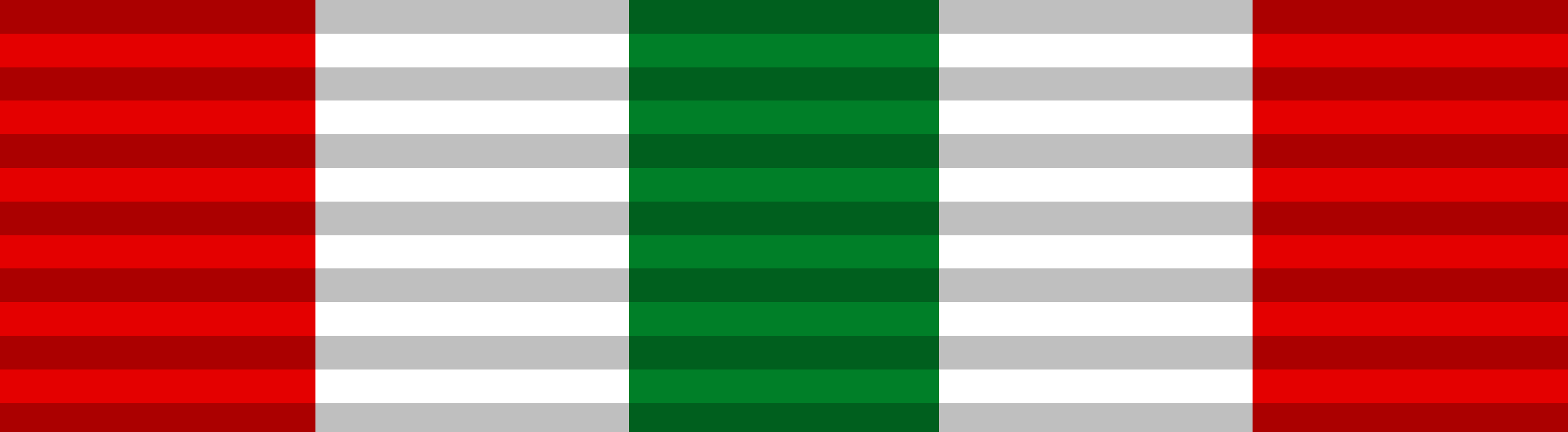
Italy Star

Defence Medal

War Medal

=== South Africa ===
On 6 April 1952 the Union of South Africa instituted its own range of military decorations and medals. These new awards were worn before all earlier British decorations and medals awarded to South Africans, with the exception of the Victoria Cross, which still took precedence before all other awards. Second World War medals awarded to South Africans continued to be worn in the order shown above, with the Africa Service Medal worn after the War Medal.
