= La Grange Village Historic District =

Historic district in Illinois, United States

- U.S. National Register of Historic Places
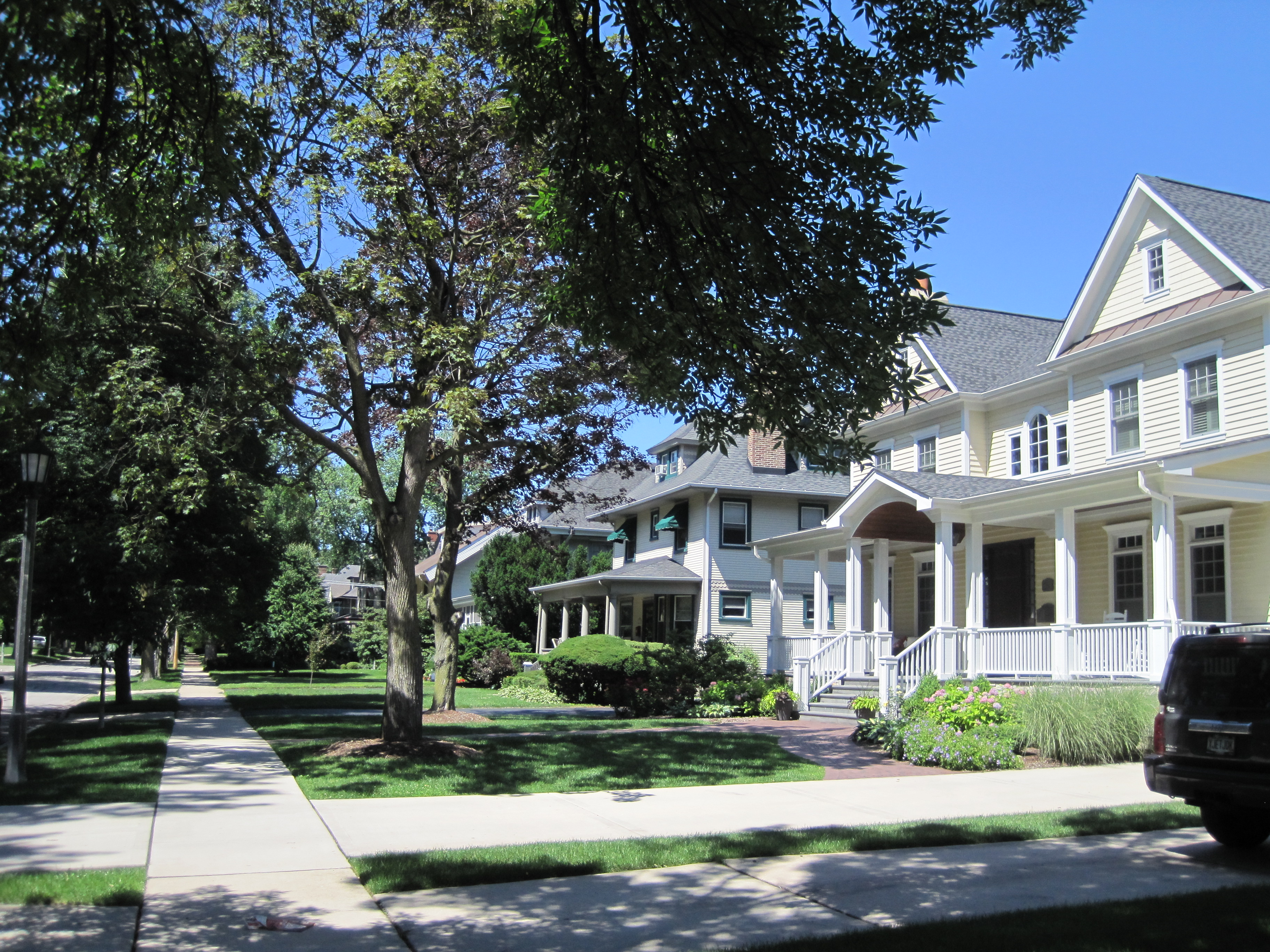

- Location within Chicago metropolitan area Location within Illinois Location within the United States
- Location: La Grange, Illinois
- Coordinates: 41°48′37″N 87°52′22″W
- Area: 215.1 acres (87.0 ha)
- Architectural style: Prairie School, Victorian, Queen Anne
- NRHP reference No.: 79000834
- Added to NRHP: August 8, 1979

The La Grange Village Historic District is a national historic district encompassing a large section of the village of La Grange, Illinois. The district includes over 1000 buildings, most of which are residences. Development in the district began in the 1870s after the Chicago, Burlington and Quincy Railroad began serving two stations in La Grange; nearly all of the buildings within the present-day district were built between then and 1930. Several popular architectural styles of the period are represented in the district, including large collections of Prairie School, Queen Anne, and Victorian houses. The district includes three designs by Frank Lloyd Wright as well as works by John S. Van Bergen, Enock Hill Turnock, and J. C. Llewelyn.

The district was added to the National Register of Historic Places on August 8, 1979.
