= LaGrange Commercial Historic District =

Historic district in Georgia, United States

- Lagrange Commercial Historic District
- U.S. National Register of Historic Places
- U.S. Historic district
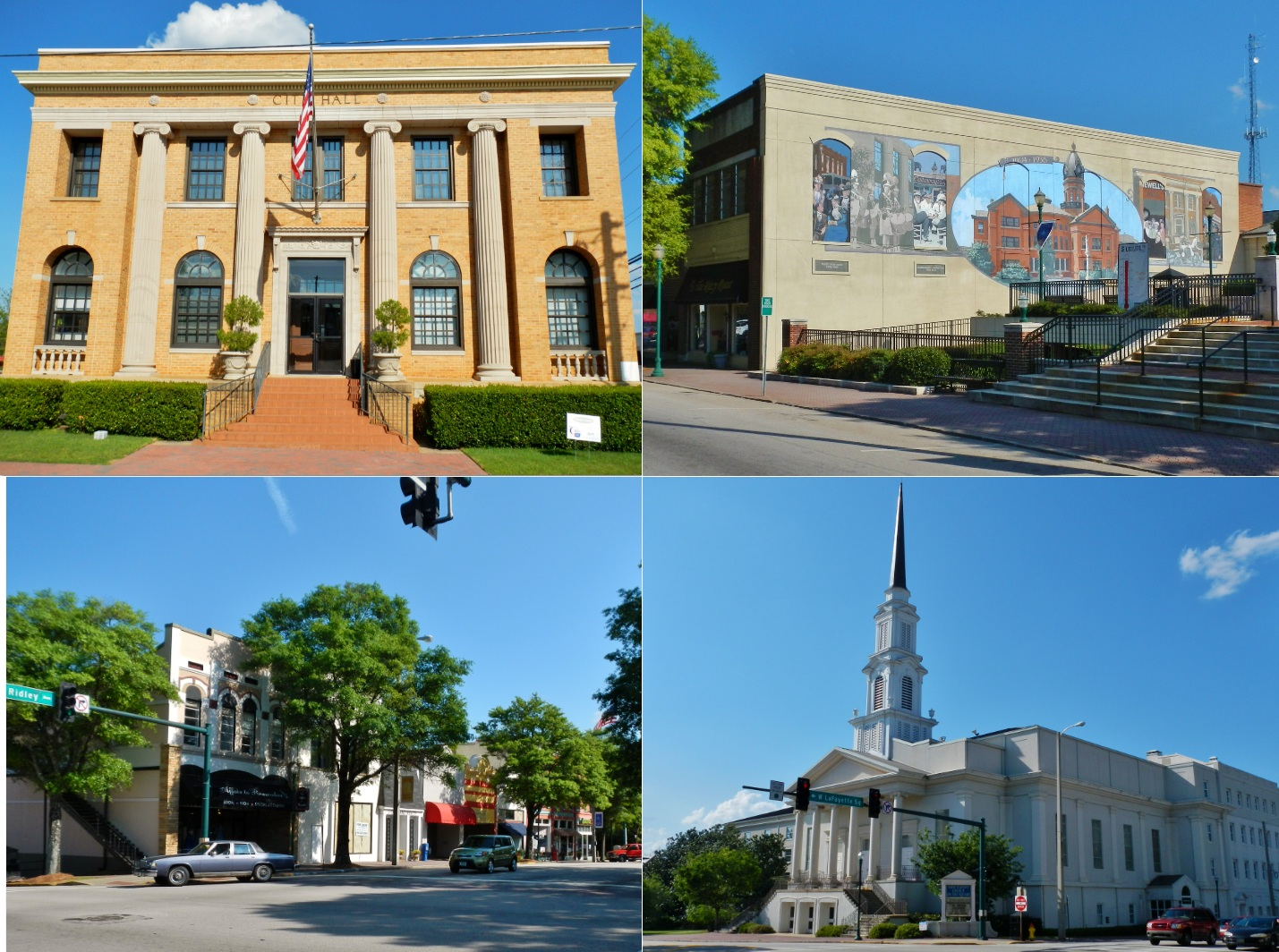

- Location within Georgia Location within the United States
- Location: Main St.--Ridley Ave., Bull St.--Church St., Broad and Greenville Sts., Vernon Rd.--LaFayette Pkwy, Haralson St., LaGrange, Georgia
- Area: 32 acres (13 ha)
- Built: 1828
- Architect: multiple
- Architectural style: Colonial Revival, Classical Revival, et al.
- MPS: Georgia County Courthouses TR
- NRHP reference No.: 01000971
- Added to NRHP: September 13, 2001

The Lagrange Commercial Historic District in LaGrange, Georgia is a 32-acre (13 ha) historic district listed on the National Register of Historic Places. It includes 72 contributing buildings, two contributing sites, and 30 non-contributing buildings.

It includes:

- Courthouse Square (1828)
- Troup County Courthouse, Annex, and Jail (1939), already separately listed on the National Register.
  - Troup County Courthouse, 118 Ridley St.
  - Troup County Jail (1892), 112 Mines St., a two-story brick building with Romanesque influence built as a private residence. It was later used as the county jail until 1939, when it was succeeded by the new facility above. The 1892 building was eventually renovated and since 2001 it has been used as the Chattahoochee Valley Art Museum. (see photos 8, 9, 26 accompanying NRHP nomination document)
- LaGrange City Hall (1926), 200 block of Ridley Avenue, a two-story brick and stone Neoclassical building (see photo 3)
- LaGrange Theater (1929), 200 block Main St., a two-story brick Italian Renaissance Revival movie theater (see photo 21)
- Hotel Colonial (1922), 119 Ridley Ave., a two-story brick Georgian Revival hotel (see photo 11)
