= LaGrange (Harris Crossroads, North Carolina) =

Historic house in North Carolina, United States

- U.S. National Register of Historic Places
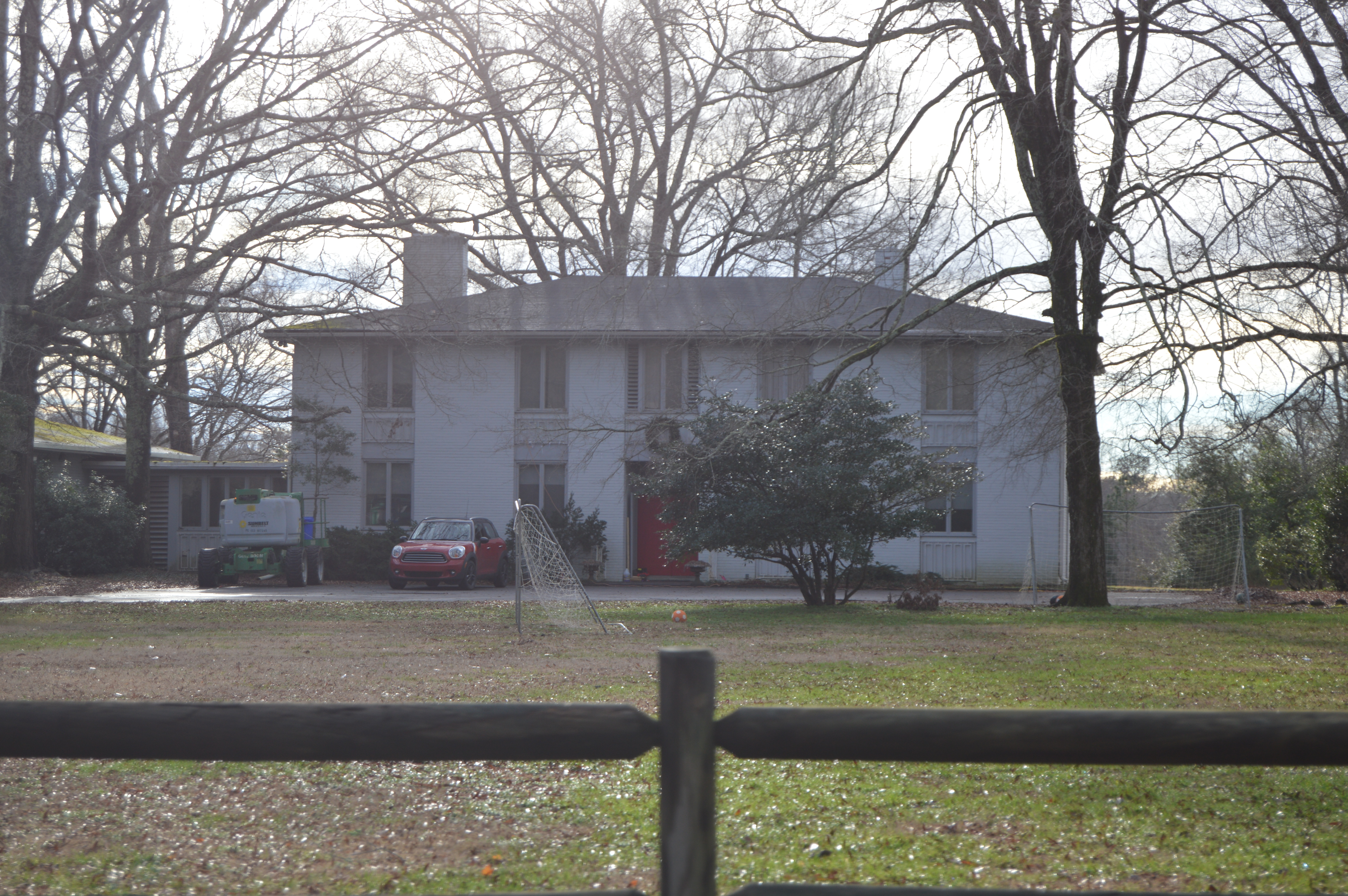

- Location within North Carolina Location within the United States
- Location: S of Townsville off SR 1308, Harris Crossroads, North Carolina, Vance County, North Carolina
- Coordinates: 36°24′17″N 78°24′42″W
- Area: 131.7 acres (53.3 ha)
- Built: c.1830
- Architectural style: Greek Revival, Italianate
- NRHP reference No.: 82003519
- Added to NRHP: April 27, 1982

LaGrange is a historic plantation house located near Harris Crossroads, Vance County, North Carolina. It was built about 1830, and is a two-story, Greek Revival style frame dwelling with Italianate style decorative elements. It has a later one-story rear ell. It features a one-story full-width front porch with a bracketed cornice and square fluted columns. Also on the property are three contributing outbuildings and a family cemetery.

It was added to the National Register of Historic Places in 1982.
