= Africa Service Medal =

South African military campaign medal for service in the Second World War

- Type: Military Campaign medal
- Awarded for: Campaign service
- Country: Union of South Africa
- Presented by: the Monarch of the United Kingdom and the Dominions of the British Commonwealth, and Emperor of India
- Eligibility: South African forces
- Campaigns: Second World War, 1939–1945
- Established: 1943

Highlights
- Total: 192,000
- Ribbon bars without and with the King's Commendation

Order of wear
- Next (higher): War Medal 1939–1945
- Next (lower): King George V Coronation Medal

The Africa Service Medal is a South African campaign medal for service during the Second World War, awarded to members of the Union Defence Forces, the South African Police and the South African Railways Police. The medal was originally intended for service in Africa, but it was later extended to cover service anywhere in the world.

== Institution ==
In addition to the British Second World War campaign medals awarded to combatants from all members of the British Commonwealth, several Commonwealth nations established their own service medals, all distinctive in design, purpose and criteria.

For South Africa, the Africa Service Medal was instituted on 23 December 1943 by King George VI in his capacity as South African head of state, and was awarded in addition to the British campaign stars and medals awarded for the war.

== Award criteria ==
The Africa Service Medal was awarded to members of the Union Defence Forces, the South African Police and the South African Railways Police.

To qualify for the medal, a member of those services must have volunteered for war service outside South Africa and must have served, either at home or abroad, between South Africa's declaration of war on 6 September 1939 and 2 September 1945 inclusive, continuously for thirty days or part-time for at least eighteen hours in non continuous training. As the name indicates, the medal was originally intended for service in Africa, up to the defeat of the Axis forces in North Africa in 1943, but it was later extended to cover service anywhere in the world, up to the end of the war in the Pacific on 2 September 1945.

Union Defence Force land forces served in East Africa in 1940 and 1941, North Africa from 1941 to 1943, Madagascar in 1942, and Italy in 1944 and 1945. The South African Air Force served in all these campaigns, as well as in West Africa from 1943 to 1945, Sicily in 1943 and South-East Europe from 1943 to 1945, and provided air support to the Warsaw uprising in 1944. Naval forces and seconded personnel served in the Mediterranean from 1941 to 1945, Greece in 1941, the Arctic convoys from 1941 to 1945, the Java Sea in 1942, Sicily in 1943, the Indian Ocean from 1943 to 1945, the D-Day invasion in 1944, and the Pacific in 1945.

In addition to the Africa Service Medal, the South African Medal for War Services was instituted in 1946 to reward voluntary unpaid service in support of the South African war during the Second World War.

== Description ==
The medal was struck in silver to a design suggested by Field Marshal Jan Smuts. It is 36 millimetres in diameter and 3 millimetres thick at the raised rim, and is affixed to the suspender by means of claws and a pin through the upper edge of the medal. The recipient's name, rank, unit and number were impressed on the edge.

Obverse

The obverse depicts a map of Africa, surrounded by the name of the medal in English and Afrikaans, "AFRICA SERVICE MEDAL" at left and "AFRIKADIENS-MEDALJE" at right.

Reverse

The reverse depicts a prancing springbok against a landscape background. There is no inscription.

Ribbon

The ribbon is 32 millimetres wide and orange-red, the colour of the shoulder flash worn by South African volunteers, edged in 3½ mm wide green and yellow bands. The green and gold are the Springbok Rugby sporting colours, which were adopted as the defence force colours.

South African Second World War ex-servicemen referred to the ribbon of this medal as Ouma's Garter. Ouma Smuts (Granny Smuts) was the nickname of the wife of the South African Second World War era prime minister, Field Marshal Jan Smuts. The nickname was a tribute to her unstinting efforts to supply the South African troops with home comforts.

== King's Commendation (1939–45) ==
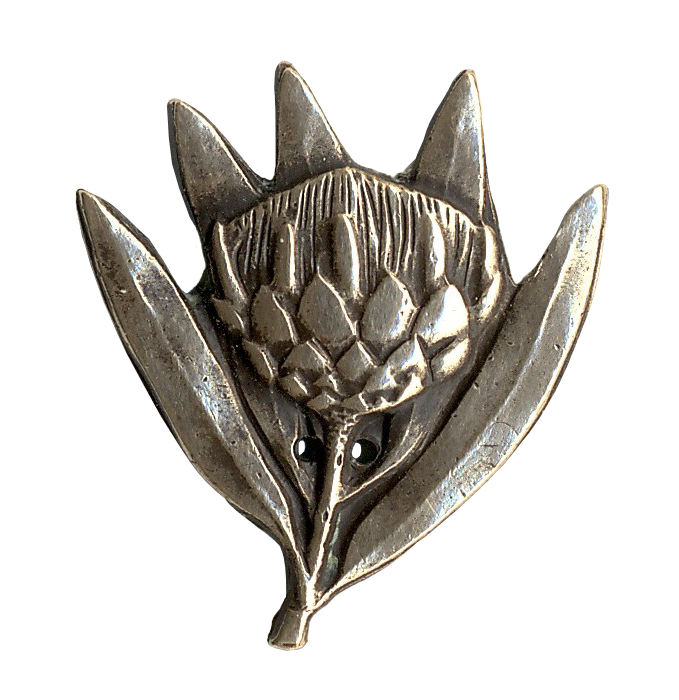

The King's Commendation (South Africa) (1939–45), denoted by a bronze King Protea flower emblem, was authorised to be worn on the ribbon of the Africa Service Medal and could be awarded for valuable services in connection with the Second World War. The Commendation could be awarded posthumously and was the equivalent of a Mention in Despatches, but for services rendered away from the battlefield. The full-size emblem, worn on the ribbon with the medal, is 19 millimetres high, and the miniature to be worn on the ribbon bar is 9 millimetres high.

== Order of wear ==
Campaign medals and stars are not listed by name in the order of wear prescribed by the British Central Chancery of the Orders of Knighthood, but are grouped together as taking precedence after the Queen's Medal for Chiefs and before the Polar Medals, in order of the date of the campaign awarded.

In the order of wear of the Second World War campaign medals, the two British campaign medals and the Africa Service Medal take precedence after the nine campaign stars, of which the order of wear was determined firstly by their respective campaign start dates, secondly by the campaign's duration and thirdly by their dates of institution.

- The 1939–1945 Star, from 3 September 1939 to 2 September 1945, the full duration of the Second World War.
- The Atlantic Star, from 3 September 1939 to 8 May 1945, the duration of the Battle of the Atlantic and the War in Europe.
- The Arctic Star, from 3 September 1939 to 8 May 1945, the duration of the Battle of the Atlantic and the War in Europe.
- The Air Crew Europe Star, from 3 September 1939 to 5 June 1944, the period until D-Day minus one.
- The Africa Star, from 10 June 1940 to 12 May 1943, the duration of the North African Campaign.
- The Pacific Star, from 8 December 1941 to 2 September 1945, the duration of the Pacific War.
- The Burma Star, from 11 December 1941 to 2 September 1945, the duration of the Burma Campaign.
- The Italy Star, from 11 June 1943 to 8 May 1945, the duration of the Italian Campaign.
- The France and Germany Star, from 6 June 1944 to 8 May 1945, the duration of the Northwest Europe Campaign.
- The Defence Medal, from 3 September 1939 to 2 September 1945, the full duration of the Second World War.
- The War Medal 1939–1945, from 3 September 1939 to 2 September 1945, the full duration of the Second World War.

The war service medals established by individual Commonwealth nations to augment the British Second World War campaign medals, all take precedence after the War Medal 1939–1945 in the respective orders of wear of those countries. These medals are, in order of date of institution:

- The Canadian Volunteer Service Medal, instituted on 22 October 1943.
- The Africa Service Medal, instituted on 23 December 1943.
- The India Service Medal, instituted on 6 June 1946.
- The New Zealand War Service Medal, instituted on 6 June 1946.
- The Australia Service Medal 1939–1945, instituted in November 1949.
- The Newfoundland Volunteer War Service Medal, instituted on 6 November 6, 1981.

=== South Africa ===
On 6 April 1952 a new set of South African decorations and medals was instituted to replace the British awards used previously. The older British decorations and medals continued to be worn in the same order but, with the exception of the Victoria Cross, took precedence after all South African orders, decorations and medals. Of the British medals applicable to South Africans, the Africa Service Medal takes precedence as shown below.

- Preceded by the War Medal 1939–1945.
- Succeeded by the King George V Coronation Medal.
