= Grange House =

Coordinates: 56.0145°N 3.5922°W

Grange House (also known as Grangepans, Grange, Old Grange, and Grange Hamilton) was an estate house near Bo'ness, West Lothian (now Falkirk council area), in Scotland. The original house was built in 1564 for Sir John Hamilton. It was demolished in 1906.

Hippolyte Blanc submitted designs to the Cadell family for additions to the house. Photographic copies of these designs survive, and are held by the National Monuments Record of Scotland.
