= Polish Army in France =

The term Polish Army in France might refer to the following units of the Polish Army:

- Polish Legions in Italy of late 18th century/early 19th century fighting for Napoleon I
- Polish Army formed in France under the command of General Józef Haller de Hallenburg during the final stages of World War I, known as the Blue Army or Haller's Army
- Polish Army in France (1939–40) formed in France under the command of General Władysław Sikorski in late 1939, after the fall of Poland in the effect of the Polish Defensive War

For more information on other Polish armies fighting alongside the French see the articles on Duchy of Warsaw and Paris Commune.
