= Polish 2nd Infantry Division =

Polish 2nd Infantry Division may refer to:

- Polish 2nd Rifle Division (1917) (Dywizja Strzelców Polskich, 1917)
- Polish 2nd Legions Infantry Division (2 Dywizja Piechoty Legionów, 1919 - 1939)
- Second Infantry Fusiliers Division (2 Dywizja Strzelców Pieszych, France, 1939-1940)
- Polish 2nd Infantry Division (East) of the Polish First Army (2 Warszawska Dywizja Piechoty im. Henryka Dąbrowskiego, Ludowe Wojsko Polskie, 1943-1956)
