= Poles in Norway =

Total population
- 108,255 (2019 Official Norway estimate) 2.10% of the Norwegian population

Regions with significant populations
- Oslo, Bergen, Stavanger, Bærum, Sandnes, Trondheim, Drammen, Asker, Sarpsborg.

Languages
- Norwegian, Polish

Religion
- Catholic (mostly)

Related ethnic groups
- Poles, Polish diaspora

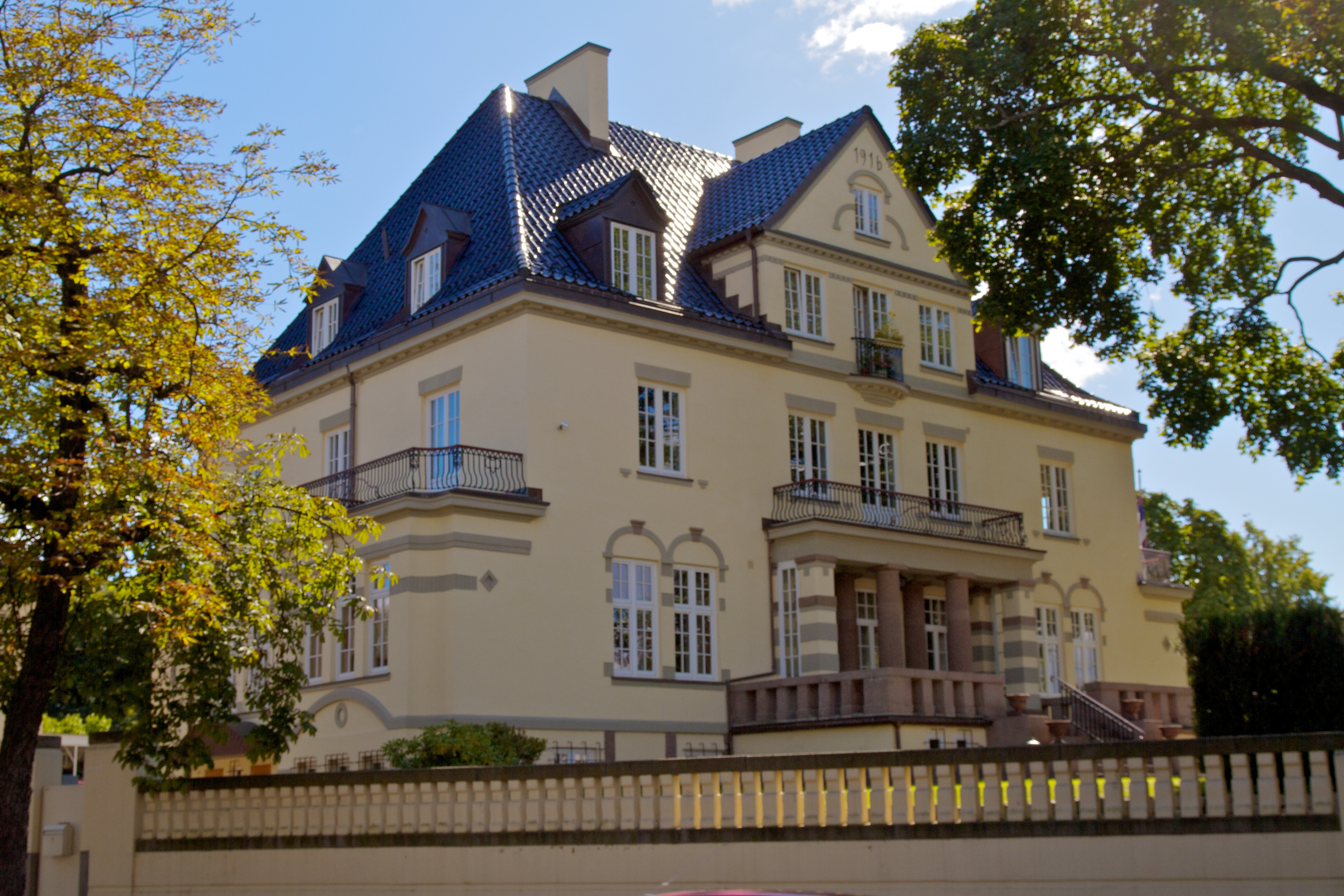
Embassy of Poland in Oslo

Poles in Norway are citizens and residents of Norway who are of Polish descent. They are the biggest immigrant group in Norway.

== Demographics ==
Norway has recently experienced an influx of Polish migrant workers. This is because Norway is a member of the European Economic Area, providing the same free movement of labour as between members of the European Union. According to Statistics Norway, there are 108,255 Poles in Norway, and make up 2.10% of the Norwegian population. It has in a short time become the largest ethnic minority in the country, and 11.86% of all foreign residents in Norway are Poles.

Places with significant populations are Oslo, Bergen, Stavanger, Bærum, Sandnes, Trondheim, Drammen, Asker, Sarpsborg.

The first Poles came to Norway in 1830-1831 after the fall of the November Uprising. Polish engineer and insurgent Aleksander Waligórski, who fled partitioned Poland after the uprising, co-developed Norway's first railroad and co-authored its first modern road map of Norway.

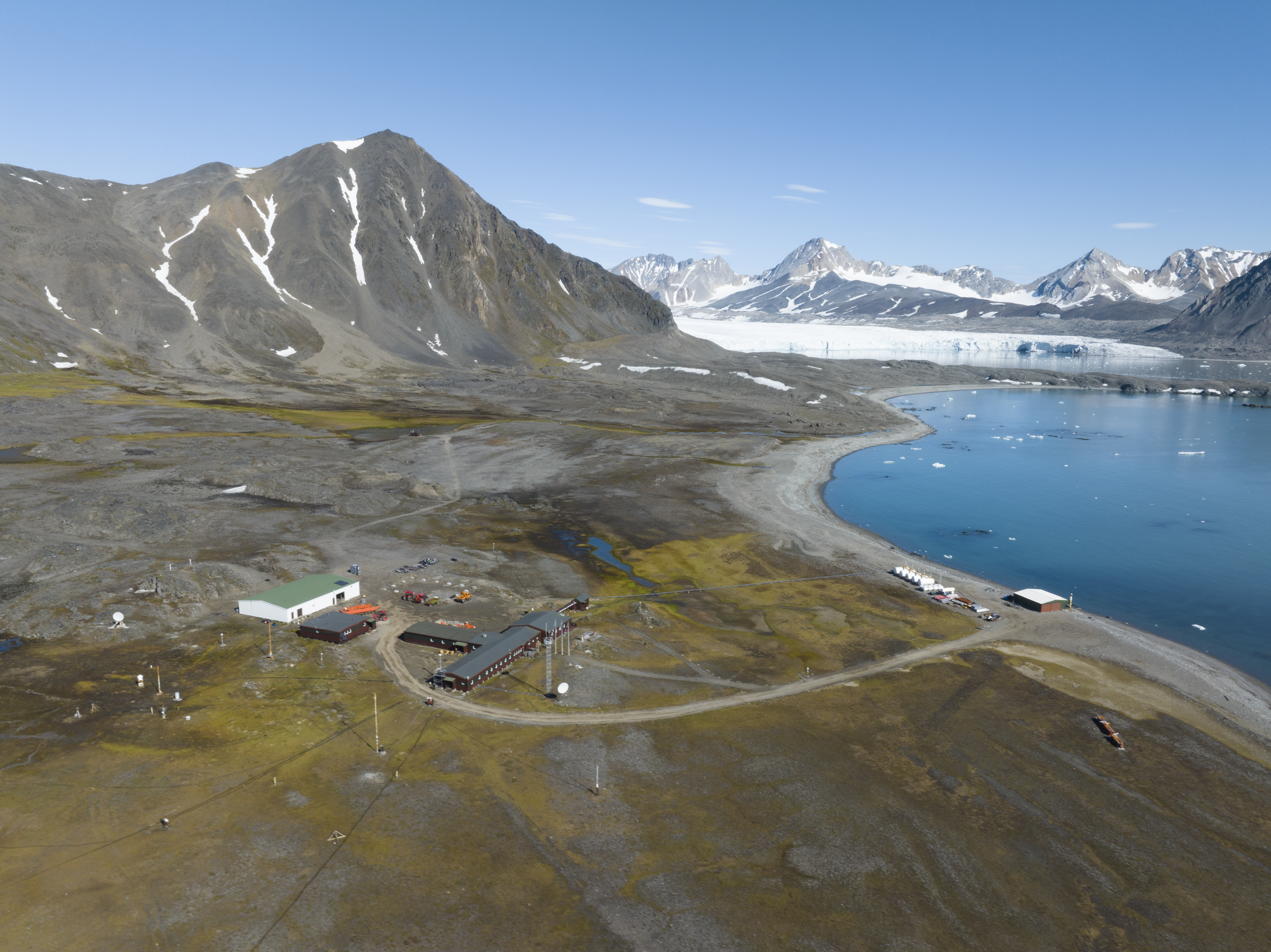
Polish Polar Station, Hornsund, Norway

In 1931 Poland signed the Svalbard Treaty, which recognizes the sovereignty of Norway over the archipelago of Svalbard in the Arctic Ocean, and grants signatories equal rights to engage in commercial activities and scientific research on the archipelago. Several Polish polar stations were established in Svalbard since.

== Crime ==
According to Statistics Norway, in the 2010-2013 period, the proportion of Poland-born perpetrators of criminal offences aged 15 and older in Norway was 66.2 per 1000 residents. This was compared to averages of 44.9 among native Norwegians and 112.9 among Norway-born residents with parents of foreign origin. When corrected for variables such as age and sex ratio (M2), residence (M3), and employment (M4), the unadjusted Polish average (M1) for 2010-2013 decreased to 46.18 after age and gender adjustment, 47.07 after residence adjustment, and 41.55 after employment adjustment. Immigrants from Poland were the only over-represented population for which all three adjustable variables, including residence, could explain their over-representation. According to Statistics Norway, as of 2015, a total of 7,952 Poland citizens residing in Norway incurred sanctions. The principal breaches were traffic offences (4,508 individuals), followed by other offences for profit (1,921 individuals), drug and alcohol offences (623 individuals), public order and integrity violations (379 individuals), property theft (368 individuals), violence and maltreatment (97 individuals), other offences (36 individuals), criminal damage (11 individuals), and sexual offences (9 individuals).

== See also ==
- Norway–Poland relations
- Polish diaspora
- Immigration to Norway
- Poles in Denmark
- Poles in Finland
- Poles in Sweden
