= Bronisław Prugar-Ketling =

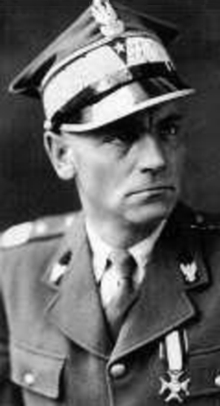

Bronisław Prugar-Ketling (2 July 1891, Trześniów, Subcarpathian Voivodeship – 18 February 1948, Warsaw) was a Polish general.

He was a member of Polish Military Organisation in World War I, later served in the Blue Army. He fought in the Polish-Soviet War.

During German invasion of Poland he commanded the Polish 11th Infantry Division in Karpaty Army. Under his command the 11th I.D. defeated the mechanized groups of the SS "Germania" Regiment in the Battle of Jaworów.

In Sikorski's Army (Polish Army in France), commanded the Second Infantry Fusiliers Division. After the fall of France, he was interned in Switzerland. Returned to Poland and reenlisted in the People's Army of Poland.

== Honours and awards ==
- Gold Cross of the Virtuti Militari, previously awarded the Silver Cross (1921)
- Commander's Cross of the Order of Polonia Restituta, previously awarded the Officer's Cross
- Order of the Cross of Grunwald, Third Class
- Cross of Independence
- Cross of Valour - twice
- Gold Cross of Merit
