= 38th Infantry Division (Poland) =

1939 Polish Army formation

- 38 Dywizja Piechoty
- Active: 1939
- Country: Poland
- Branch: Army
- Type: Infantry
- Part of: Tarnów Operational Group
- Nickname: "Felicja"
- Engagements: September Campaign; Battle of Jaworów

Commanders
- Commander: Col. Alojzy Wir-Konas

The 38th Infantry Division (Reserve) was a unit of the Polish Army in the interbellum period (see: Second Polish Republic). It was created by merging several units of the Border Defence Corps, and its purpose was to support activities of Army Kraków and Army Karpaty, which guarded southern border of Poland. Its commandant was Colonel Alojzy Wir-Konas.

The Division was formed on September 9, 1939 (see: Polish September Campaign). After concentration, which took place in the area of Nizankowice, it was transferred to the Army Karpaty and on September 11, it began withdrawal towards the Romanian Bridgehead. On the road, it recaptured the town of Sadowa Wisznia, which had been occupied by German 1st Mountain Division. The division was assigned two out of three from the 1. Heaviest Artillery Regiment.

Cut off behind the German advance, the division took part in the Battle of Jaworów, an attempt to break through to Lwów, from September 15.

On September 17 the Division found itself in the area of Janów Lubelski, where it was surrounded by the Germans. A battle ensued, in the evening the Division reached Brzuchowice in the suburbs of Lwów. Two days later the survivors managed to enter Lwów.

== See also ==
- Polish army order of battle in 1939
- Polish contribution to World War II
- List of Polish divisions in World War II
