= War Cross (Norway) =

Highest-ranking Norwegian gallantry award

War Cross with sword
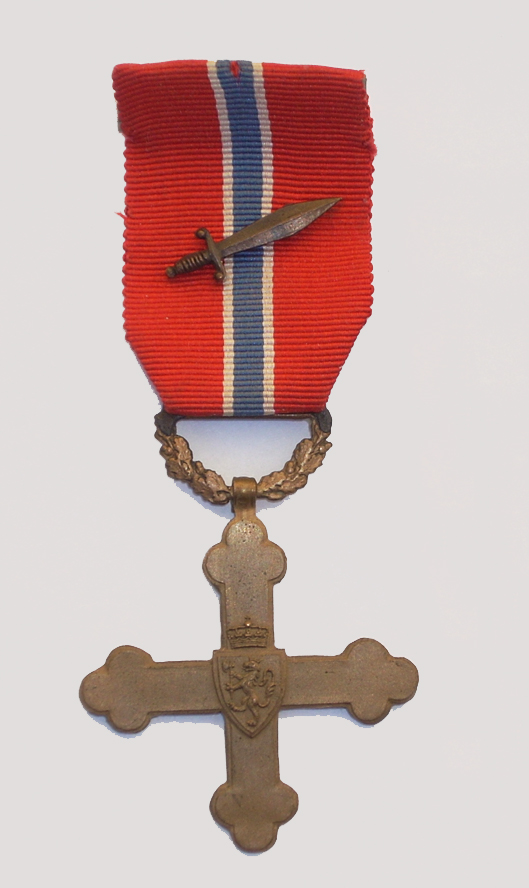
- Type: Military cross
- Awarded for: Extraordinary brave actions or extraordinary leadership during combat
- Presented by: Norway
- Status: Currently awarded
- Established: 23 May 1941
- First award: 28 November 1941
- Final award: 3 March 2017

Highlights
- Total: 290
- Total awarded posthumously: 26

Precedence
- Next (higher): none
- Next (lower): Medal for Outstanding Civic Service

The War Cross with Sword (Krigskorset med sverd; Krigskrossen med sverd) is the highest ranking Norwegian gallantry decoration. It is awarded for extraordinary brave actions or extraordinary leadership during combat. A recipient deemed worthy of additional citations will receive up to an additional two swords on the medal ribbon in addition to the "standard" single sword. Additional citations are rare: Gunnar Sønsteby is the only person to have received the War Cross with three swords (more appropriately known as "War Cross with sword and two swords").

== History ==
The medal was established on 23 May 1941 by royal resolution of King Haakon VII, who was in London with the government in exile due to the German occupation of Norway. At that time, "royal" awards were made (to members of the British Royal family for example) and awards could be made for meritorious activities not associated with combat (extraordinary achievements or contributions for Norway's cause and war effort): these were made without the sword. The statutes were amended on 18 May 1945, restricting awards to the actions of military personnel in combat situations, thus all subsequent decorations would to be "with sword". At the same time, Haakon VII's Freedom Cross was established to replace the War Cross for civilian achievements.

Awards of the War Cross ceased in 1949, but on 26 June 2009 the statutes were again revised to permit awards for actions after 1945.

In 2022, the Norwegian Armed Forces commissioned Marcus Paus to write a major work to tell the stories of the War Cross recipients. The Armed Forces said the idea is that the work will be a major "identity-building and unifying" work for the armed forces.

== Recipients ==
Since its inception, the War Cross has been awarded to 126 non-Norwegians. These awards were mostly for actions during the Norwegian Campaign of 1940.

The number of recipients from various nations:

- 66 France (mostly French Foreign Legion and Chasseurs Alpins).
- 42 UK (including a gracious award to their Majesties, King George VI and Queen Elizabeth, King Haakon's host and hostess "for the duration").
- 13 Poland (the Polish Independent Highland Brigade).
- 2 US.
- 1 Denmark (but serving with the Royal Norwegian Air Force).
- 1 Greece (a "courtesy award" to his kinsman George II, King of the Hellenes).
- 1 Canada (serving with the Royal Engineers).

=== Canadian recipient ===
Gazetted 11 August 1942 while serving with the British Army:

- Lt (temp Capt) Harry FitzGibbon Boswell, Royal Engineers (RE) (later Col & OBE)

=== Norwegian recipients ===
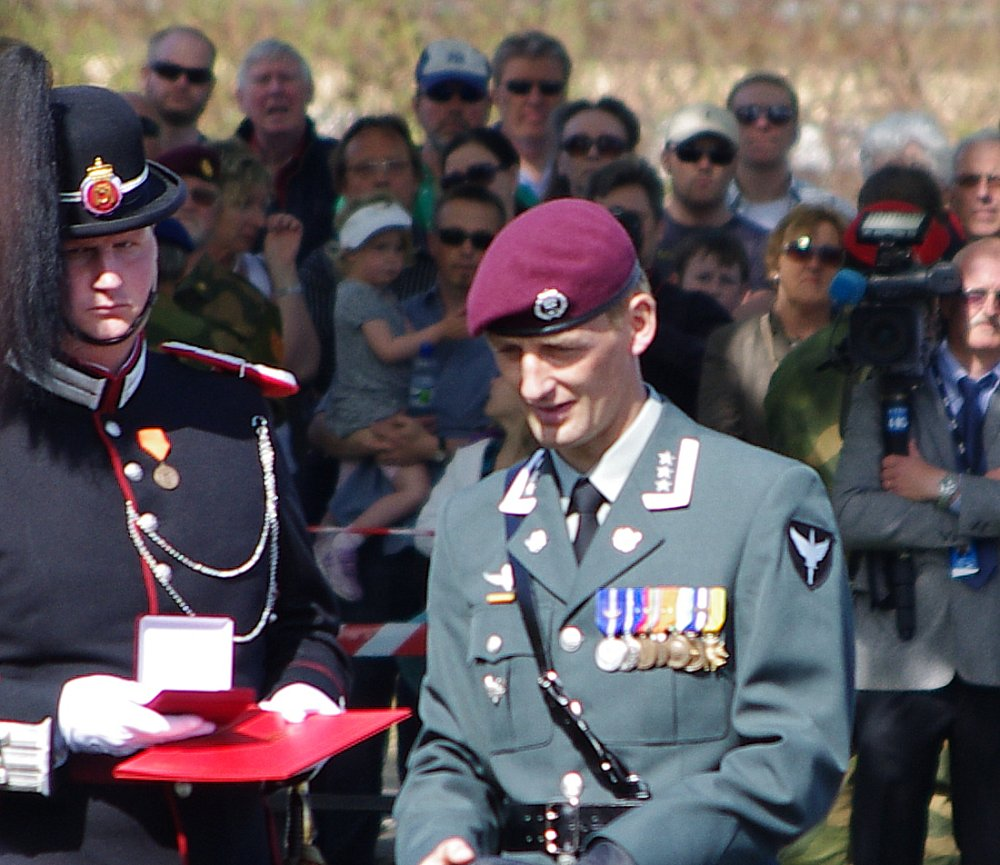
Colonel Kristoffersen at the award ceremony 8 May 2011

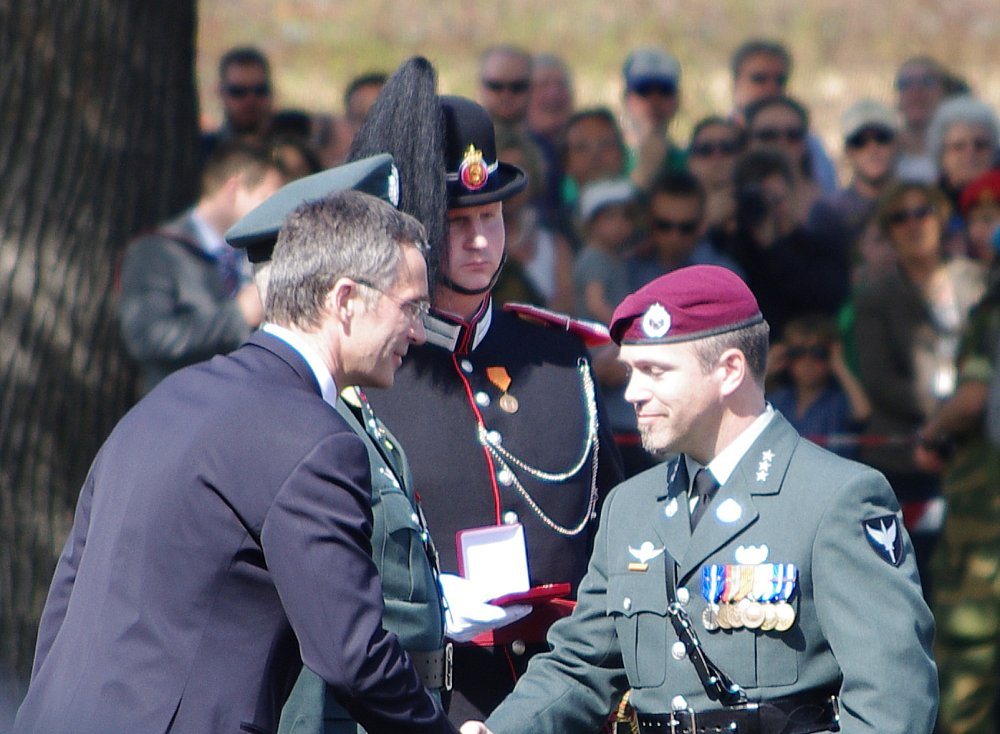
Captain Lian 8 May 2011

- Joakim Rønneberg (with one sword) for his work as a Norwegian resistance fighter during World War II.
- Gunnar Sønsteby (with three swords) for his work as a Norwegian resistance fighter during World War II.
- Lieutenant Max Manus (with two swords) for his work as a Norwegian resistance fighter during World War II.
- Leif Larsen (with two swords).
- Oluf Reed-Olsen for his work as a Norwegian resistance fighter during World War II.
- Erik Gjems-Onstad for his work as a Norwegian resistance fighter during World War II.
- Hugo Munthe-Kaas for his efforts in Operation Upsilon III during World War II.
- Colonel Birger Eriksen for his command of the Oscarsborg Fortress in the Battle of Drøbak Sound.
- Captain Martin Linge (with one sword) for his command of the Norwegian Independent Company 1
- Boy Rist for outstanding efforts during the execution of special missions, as Leader for Polar Bear 1, Narvik.
- Eiliv Austlid was awarded the citation on 2 October 2009, for actions in April 1940, settling a case that had been discussed in the press for some time. The new award raised the total number of persons awarded The War Cross to 275 and the total number of awards, which includes seven French military colours, to 282. It has been revealed that at least one soldier is being considered for the award after action with the International Security Assistance Force in the Afghanistan war.
- Lieutenant Commander Trond André Bolle was awarded the War Cross with Sword (posthumously) on 21 January 2011. The decision was announced by the Minister of Defence, Grete Faremo, shortly after the cabinet session the same day. Lt. Cmdr. Bolle receives the award for his actions and behaviour during his command of the Norwegian Special Operations Force Task Group II in support of Operation Enduring Freedom in Afghanistan's Helmand province from October 2005 to February 2006. According to the Minister of Defence, Lt. Cmdr Bolle performed "above and beyond the call of duty" on numerous occasions during this period, his leadership was described as "exemplary". Lieutenant Commander Trond André Bolle was killed in action on 27 June 2010, in an IED incident in Afghanistan's Faryab province. Three other soldiers, Christian Lian, Simen Tokle and Andreas Eldjarn were also killed in the incident, which happened on the road between Khwaja Gawhar (35.92n, 64.2875E) and Almar Bazar (35.846N, 64.53e). The vehicle was the fourth vehicle in a row of four vehicles. This award marks the first award of the War Cross with Sword for actions performed after the end of World War II. The award was presented on Veterans day (also Victory in Europe Day), 8 May 2011.
- Colonel Eirik Johan Kristoffersen was awarded the citation on 8 April 2011, for outstanding leadership and bravery during operations in Afghanistan. The award was presented on Veterans day (also Victory in Europe Day), 8 May 2011.
- Captain Jørg Lian of Special Forces FSK was awarded the citation on 8 April 2011, for outstanding leadership and bravery during operations in Afghanistan. The award was presented on Veterans day (also Victory in Europe Day), 8 May 2011.
- Lieutenant Lars Kristian Lauritzen for bravery and courage in combat during international operations in Afghanistan (ISAF) in 2007.
- Major Kristian Bergh Stang for particularly excellent courage and leadership in combat during international operations in Afghanistan (ISAF) in 2008.
- Marinejegerkommandoen operator Ken Andersen for "extraordinary courage" in two separate counter-terror operations in Kabul, Afghanistan, the first responding to the 2015 Park Palace guesthouse attack on 13 May 2015, the second in response to an attack on the Russian embassy on 6 October 2015.

Recipients of the War Cross are ranked 33 in the national Norwegian order of precedence, after bearers of Royal Norwegian Order of St. Olav with collar and before recipients of the Medal for Outstanding Civic Achievement.

=== Polish recipients ===
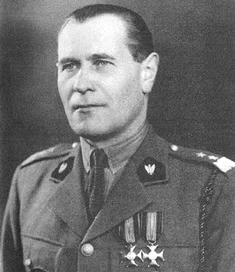
Gen. Zygmunt Bohusz-Szyszko

If not stated otherwise, all recipients were soldiers of the Polish Independent Highland Brigade (Samodzielna Brygada Strzelcow Podhalanskich), awarded 1942.

- Gen Władysław Sikorski - Prime Minister and C-in-C of the Polish Armed Forces (1943-posthumously)
- Maj-Gen Zygmunt Bohusz-Szyszko - Commander of the Polish Independent Highland Brigade
- Lt-Col Janusz Iliński
- Lt-Col Wacław Kobyliński
- Maj Andrzej Stańczyk
- Capt Rudolf Marian Neuman
- Capt Józef Roman Utnicki
- Lt Kazimierz Kędzierski
- Lt Brunon Utnicki
- 2nd Lt Piotr Szewczyk
- Cadet Leon Słupieński
- Cpl Kazimierz Dziedzioch
- Pte Wasyl Cykwas
- Pte Jan Lasowski

=== UK recipients ===
All the awards were made in 1942, unless stated:

Royal Family:

- King George VI
- Queen Elizabeth

Royal Navy: Gazetted 13 October 1942

- Capt Bernard Armitage Warburton Warburton-Lee VC, (2nd Destroyer Flotilla).
- Capt Louis Henry Keppel Hamilton. HMS Aurora. (later Admiral & KCB)
- Capt John Graham Hewitt DSO
- Cdr Richard Been Stannard VC (HMT Arab)
- Acting Skpr David George Spindler CGM
- PO George Campbell Skene CGM

Gazetted 23 March 1943:

- Lt-Cdr Sir Alexander "Sandy" Glen, DSC*, CBE (1964), KBE (1967), Czechoslovak War Cross, Patron's medal of the Royal Geographical Society (1940), the silver Polar medal (1942), and the Bruce medal of the Royal Society of Edinburgh—whilst attached to the SOE

Other

- Lt-Cdr John W. Waterhouse

Royal Marines: Gazetted 13 October 1942

- Cpl Roy David Page DSM

Army: Gazetted 11 August 1942

- Lt-Col (acting Col) Arthur Joseph Beveridge OBE MC, Royal Army Medical Corps (RAMC)
- Maj (temp Lt-Col, actg Brig) Millis Rowland Jefferis MC, Royal Engineers (RE)
- Maj (temp Lt-Col) Andrew Daniel Clinch, King's Own Yorkshire Light Infantry (KOYLI)
- Maj Patrick George John Mary Davies Bulfin, Green Howards
- Capt (temp Maj actg Lt-Col) Arthur Stuart Talbot Godfrey, RE
- Capt (temp Maj) Charles Julian Deedes, KOYLI
- Capt (acting Maj) Richard Oswald Spotswood Dimmock, York and Lancaster Regiment
- Capt William Millar Burgess, RAMC
- Lt (acting Capt) Reginald George Coleman, Leicestershire Regiment
- Lt Charles Joseph Rowlinson, Leicestershire Regiment
- Sgt Clarence Peacock MM, Green Howards
- Sgt William Alexander Liddell Wilkinson, Sherwood Foresters
- Cpl Albert Neal, Leicestershire Regiment
- Pte Ernest Monkman, KOYLI
- Pte James Mountford, KOYLI
- Roy Hughes Irish Guards

Royal Air Force: Gazetted 6 October 1942

- Acting Grp Cpt Kenneth Brian Boyd Cross DSO DFC 46 Squadron (later Air Chief Marshal & KCB, CBE).
- Acting Wg Cdr John Collins Mayhew
- Acting Wg Cdr Francis Davies Stephen Scott-Malden (later Air Vice-Marshal & DSO DFC*, Order of Orange-Nassau)
- Acting Sqn Ldr William James Pond MM
- Acting Flt Lt Herbert Horatio Kitchener DFM 263 Squadron (later W/C)
- W/O George Wyndham Parker MM
- W/O Anthony Paul Reen DFM
- Flt Sgt Neville Willson Kemp
- Sgt Thomas Laidlaw Humble
- Cpl Reginald Bernard Coomber.

Gazetted 18 December 1942:

- Grp Cpt.Richard Atcherley, OBE, AFC (later Air Marshal & KBE, CB, AFC*).
- Acting Air Commodore Whitney Straight DFC, MC (later Air Commodore & CBE, Legion of Merit).
- Acting Wg Cdr Edward James Fawdry
- Flt Lt Dennis Edward Healy DSO

1943 Additions:

- 1943: Lt-Col. Amherst Barrow Whatman MBE
- 1943: Wg Cdr. Patrick G. Jameson 46 Squadron

=== US recipients ===
- CAPT Alfred Carini. died 1945. Master of SS Henry Bacon.
- LTC Keith N. Allen. died 1944. Pilot of a US Army Air Force plane dropping supplies to the Norwegian underground

== See also ==
- Orders, decorations, and medals of Norway
