= Polish Independent Highland Brigade =

Official name for the Polish military unit created in France in 1939

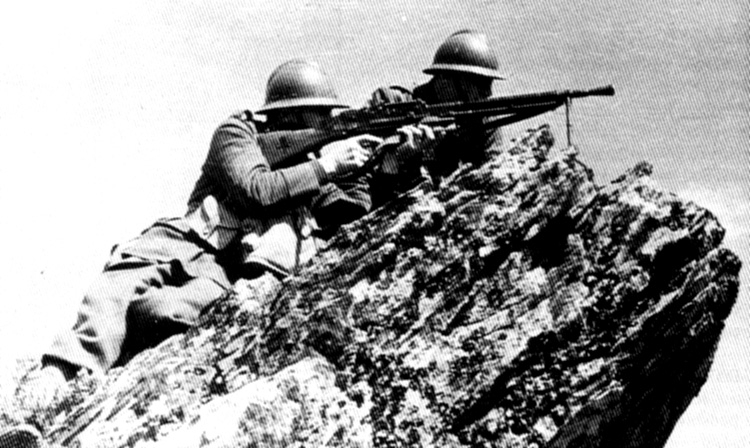
Members of the Polish Independent Highland Brigade in the Battles of Narvik.

The Polish Independent Highland Brigade (Polish: Samodzielna Brygada Strzelców Podhalańskich) was a Polish military unit created in France in 1939, after the fall of Poland, as part of the Polish Army in France. It had approximately 5,000 soldiers trained in mountain warfare and was commanded by General Zygmunt Szyszko-Bohusz. It was named after the region of Podhale in southern Poland.

In February it was assigned to the Anglo-French expeditionary corps prepared to be sent to Finland. Eventually in May and June 1940 it took part in the Allied campaign in Norway and fought with distinction in the Battles of Narvik. After the beginning of hostilities on the Western Front, the brigade was withdrawn to France, where it fought in the defence of Brittany. Disbanded, some of its soldiers were evacuated to Britain and Egypt, while others joined the French resistance.

Thirteen members were awarded the Norwegian War Cross with Sword Award by King Haakon VII in 1942 for their actions in World War II.

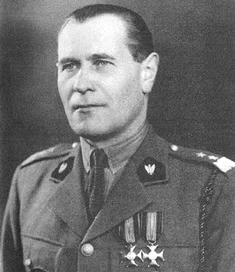
Gen. Zygmunt Bohusz-Szyszko, 1944

== Notable members ==
The following thirteen members were recipients of the War Cross Award:

- Maj-Gen Zygmunt Bohusz-Szyszko - Commander of the Polish Independent Highland Brigade
- Lt-Col Janusz Iliński
- Lt-Col Wacław Kobyliński
- Maj Andrzej Stańczyk
- Capt Rudolf Marian Neuman
- Capt Józef Roman Utnicki
- Lt Kazimierz Kędzierski
- Lt Brunon Utnicki
- 2nd Lt Piotr Szewczyk
- Cadet Leon Słupieński
- Cpl Kazimierz Dziedzioch
- Pte Wasyl Cykwas
- Pte Jan Lasowski

== See also ==
- Norway–Poland relations
- Podhale Rifles
