= Clarence Peacock =

British soldier who served in Norway during World War II

DCM, MM Clarence Peacock
- Born: 18 November 1910
- Died: 8 April 1958 (aged 47)
- Military career
- Allegiance: United Kingdom
- Branch: British Army
- Rank: Regimental Sergeant Major
- Unit: Coldstream Guards
- Conflicts: Second World War

Regimental Sergeant Major Clarence "Lofty" Peacock, DCM, MM (18 November 1910 – 8 April 1958) was a British soldier who served in Norway during World War II, for which he was awarded Norway's highest gallantry decoration the Norwegian War Cross with Sword.

== Military service ==
=== Early service ===
Peacock served first in the Coldstream Guards, leaving the Army after six years' service. After a few years, he rejoined the Army in 1936, this time in the Green Howards (1st Battalion at Portland). He was stationed in Palestine, where he distinguished himself as a lance-corporal in December 1938 when his unit was attacked on the road between Nablus and Tulkarm. His section was ambushed at close range with rifle fire, but Peacock largely suppressed the attack with well-placed fire from his Bren gun, despite a wound to his head. For his coolness and bravery in action, he was awarded the Military Medal, which was presented by the Princess Royal during a parade at Catterick to mark the Green Howards' 250th anniversary.

=== World War II ===
After the German attack on Norway in April 1940, Peacock, now a sergeant, was sent to Norway with his unit. He distinguished himself in a fighting retreat against the invading forces at Otta in Gudbrandsdalen on 28 April 1940, in circumstances which emphasised his courage, bravery and service readiness. For this action, Peacock was awarded the War Cross with Sword by the Norwegian Minister in London on 20 March 1942.

After Norway, Peacock's war service took place around the world. In the war's last days Peacock again distinguished himself again in battle at Büchen in Schleswig-Holstein on 1 May 1945, about 45 km east of Hamburg. During this action against effective German resistance, Company Sergeant Major Peacock's company took heavy casualties, including all the officers except an inexperienced 2nd lieutenant and Peacock was left in effective charge. He personally led the attack on Büchen, including an attack on an enemy machine-gun post, and arranged the evacuation of casualties despite heavy and accurate enemy fire. Peacock's assessment and leadership helped to ensure the attack's success and he was rewarded for his part with the Distinguished Conduct Medal.

=== After World War II ===
After the war he served in Malaya, Cyprus and Hong Kong.

On his return from Malaya, he became Regimental Sergeant Major (RSM) of the Depot at Richmond and during the following three years in this post, he gained a position of great respect. In 1954, he requested a posting as RSM of the 2nd Battalion in Cyprus. The two battalions were subsequently merged and Peacock became 1st Battalion's RSM and went with them to Hong Kong.

Illness necessitated Peacock's return to England in December 1956, and after a lengthy treatment he became RSM of HQ Northern Command at York on the Long Service List. Peacock's last duty with his Regiment was to take part with the representative party at the funeral of the Norwegian King Haakon in October 1957.

== Retirement and death ==
Clarence Peacock died in Queen Alexandra's Military Hospital Millbank on Tuesday 8 April 1958. His coffin was carried by eight Warrant Officers of the Green Howards and he was buried in Richmond with full military honours. The esteem in which he was widely held is indicated by the large number of military and civilian attendees at his funeral and the display of his medals at the Regimental Museum in Richmond.

Peacock was father to four sons, two of whom, Joe and Walter, also joined the Green Howards.

== Honours and awards ==
Peacock's service exploits are part of the exhibition in the Green Howards' Regimental Museum in Richmond, North Yorkshire; all other individuals thus displayed were recipients of the Victoria Cross.

- Norwegian War Cross with Sword (1942)
- Distinguished Conduct Medal (1945, Germany)
- Military Medal (1938, Palestine)
- General Service Medal with service clasps for Palestine, Malaya and Cyprus
- 1939-1945 Star
- Africa Star
- Italy Star
- France and Germany Star
- Defence Medal
- War Medal 1939–1945
- Queen Elizabeth II Coronation Medal
- Long Service and Good Conduct Medal
- Mentioned in Despatches three times (including one in Cyprus)
