= Józef Roman Utnicki =

Polish Army officer (1912–1991)

Captain Józef Roman Utnicki

Personal details
- Born: 1912; Jedlnia, Poland
- Died: 1991 (aged 78–79); Great Britain
- Awards: Virtuti Militari

Military service
- Allegiance: Poland
- Branch/service: Polish Army
- Rank: Captain
- Battles/wars: Battle of Narvik

Józef Roman Utnicki (1912–1991) was a Polish teacher and military officer. He served in the Polish Army throughout World War II. As a first lieutenant with the Polish Independent Highland Brigade, for his service during the Norwegian Campaign of 1940 he was awarded the Virtuti Militari, he was also among the thirteen Poles awarded the Norwegian War Cross with Sword by king Haakon VII of Norway. After the war he remained in Great Britain.

== Career ==
Utnicki was born 19 March 1912 in the town of Jedlnia near Radom, then in Russian-held part of Poland. Utnicki received military training in mid-1930s and was promoted to the rank of Podporucznik (Second Lieutenant) at the end of 1935. During the Invasion of Poland, he served as commanding officer of the 9th Infantry Company of the 72nd Infantry Regiment (28th Infantry Division). After the Polish defeat he managed to evade capture by the invading Germans and Soviets and reached France, where he joined the Polish Armed Forces in the West. He was soon promoted to the rank of Porucznik (First Lieutenant) and joined the Polish Independent Highland Brigade as the commanding officer of 1st Rifle Company, 1st Battalion. Together with his unit, Utnicki took part in the lengthy Battle of Narvik of 1940, capturing the Ankenesstrand peninsula.

After the battle, Utnicki was relocated with his unit to France, where he took part in the defence of Brittany during the Battle of France. After the French surrender, he managed to evade captivity once again and reached Great Britain. Promoted to the rank of captain, he joined the Polish intelligence services and spent the remainder of the war in Scotland as a member of the Information and Intelligence Division of the Staff of the Commander in Chief.

After the war he remained in the United Kingdom, where he died in 1991. His body was brought back to Poland.

== Awards and decorations ==
- Silver Cross of Virtuti Militari (V class)
- Norwegian War Cross with Sword
