= 1st Heavy Artillery Regiment (Poland) =

Interwar Polish Army unit

The Polish 1st Heavy Artillery Regiment (1 Pułk Artylerii Najcięższej) was formed in mid-1920 and saw limited combat at the end of the Polish-Soviet War in 1920. At the time, the unit was equipped with 210 millimetres (21 cm) mortars and 149.1 millimetres (14.91 cm) cannons. By 1921 the regiment was motorized and 155 millimetres (15.5 cm) howitzers were added. In 1934, the unit was moved to Gora Kalwaria.

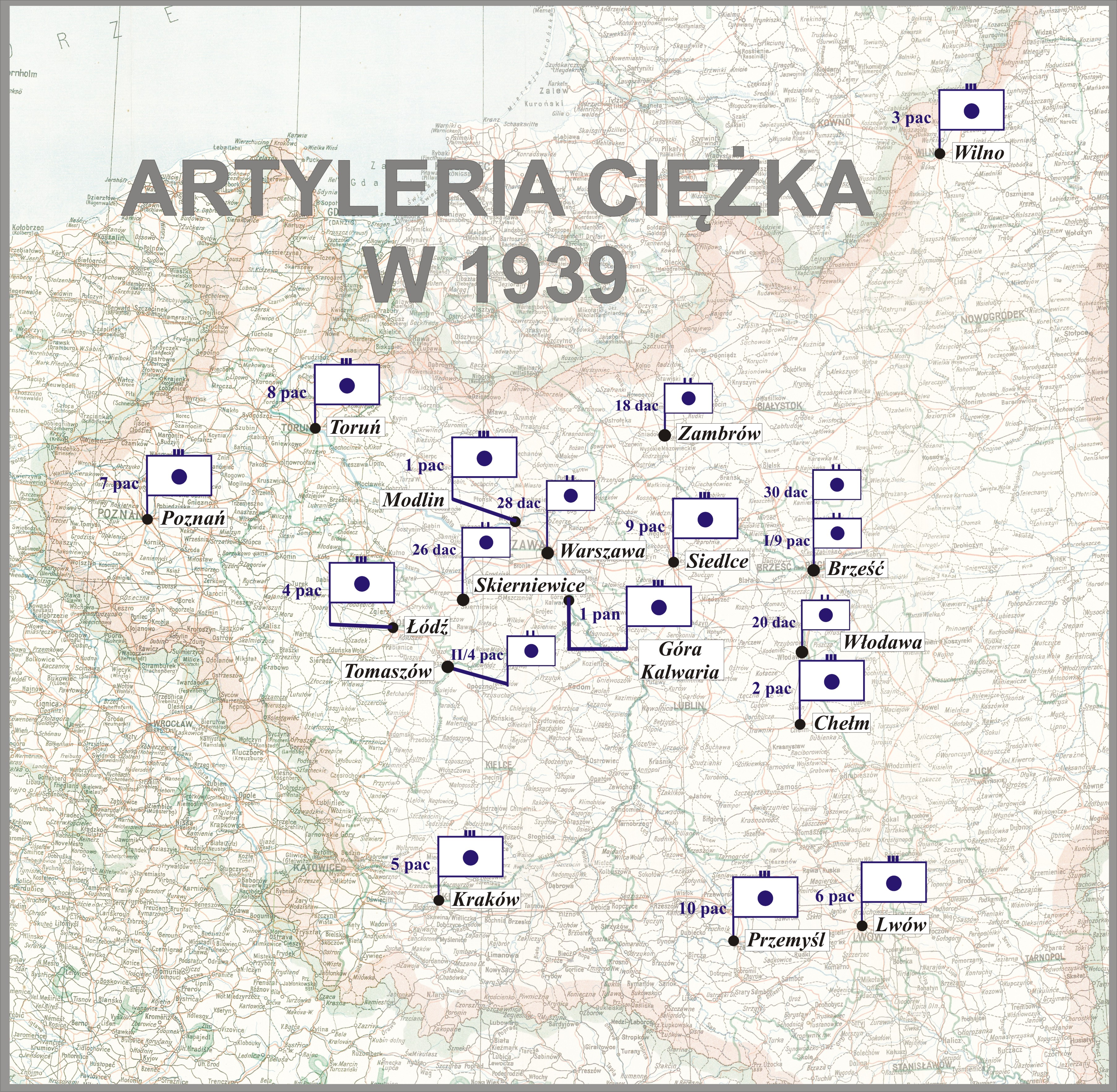
Artyleria ciężka w 1939 przed wybuchem II wojny światowej

== World War II ==
In 1938, the 155 millimetres (15.5 cm) howitzers were handed down to the heavy artillery regiments. During the Invasion of Poland in 1939, one out of three battalions was assigned to Armia Modlin, and two battalions to the 38th Infantry Division (Poland).
