= Norway–Poland relations =

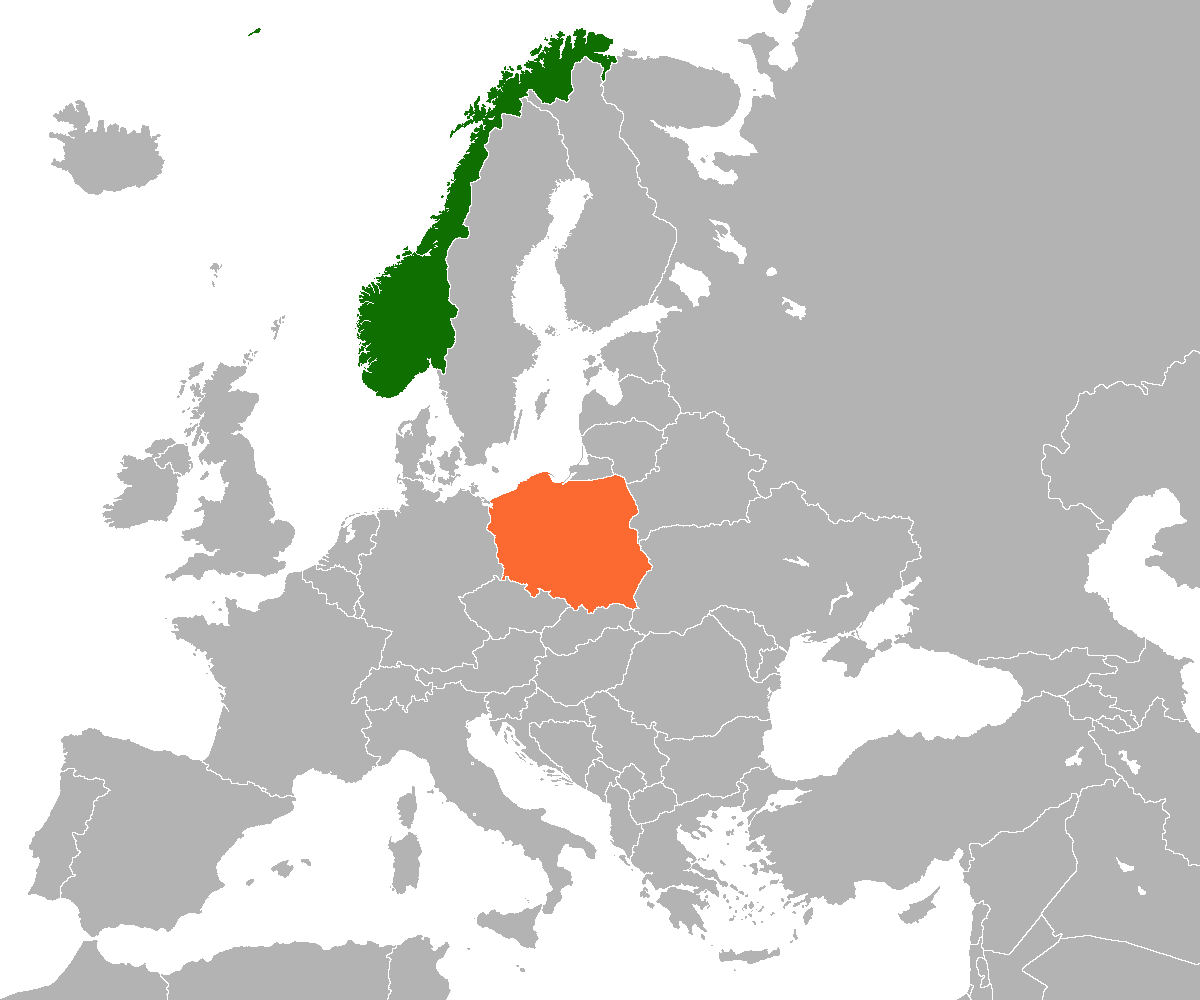
- Norway: Poland

Norway–Poland relations are the diplomatic relations between the Kingdom of Norway and the Republic of Poland. Both nations enjoy friendly relations, the importance of which centers on mutual historical relations and the fact that more than 100,000 Polish citizens live in Norway on a permanent basis, Poles make up 2.10% of the Norwegian population. Both nations are members of the Council of Europe, Council of the Baltic Sea States, NATO, OECD, OSCE, United Nations and the World Trade Organization. Poland is a full member of the European Union, while Norway is not.

== History ==
=== Early history ===
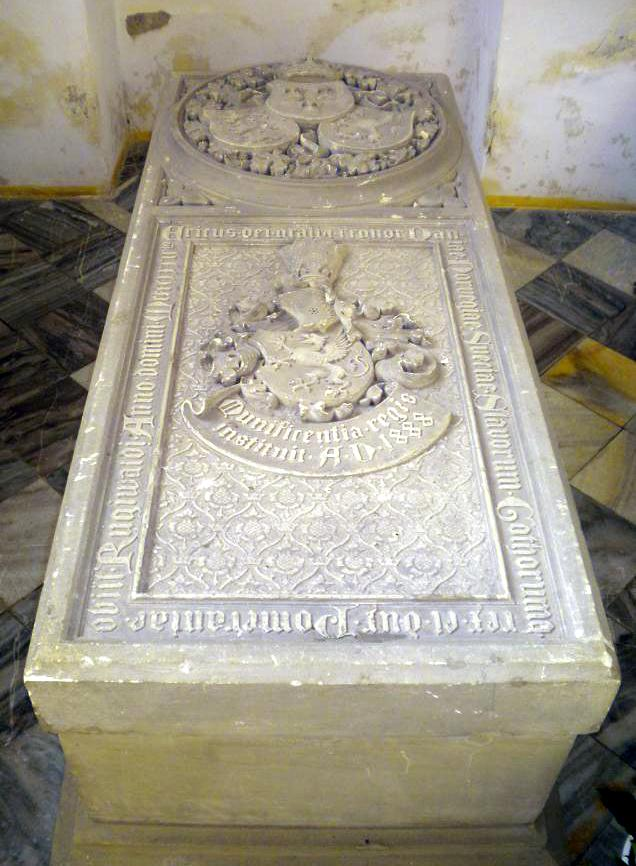
Tomb of King Eric III of Norway in Darłowo, Poland

The first contact between Norway and Poland took place in the Middle Ages with Vikings (Norsemen) from Scandinavia sailing up the Vistula river in Poland. The Vikings also founded and settled in Jomsborg in Pomerania and became known as Jomsvikings. Archaeological findings confirm the presence of people from Norway in the port city of Wolin in Poland in the second half of the 10th century, whereas slightly later traces of Slavic settlement extend to northern Norway.

Official contact between both nations began in the 10th century when Polish Princess Świętosława (daughter of Mieszko I of Poland) married King Sweyn Forkbeard of Denmark and Norway. From their union, their son Cnut the Great would continue to rule Norway and the North Sea Empire. According to some sagas, Bolesław I the Brave of Poland supported Olaf Tryggvason of Norway against Denmark in the 990s.

In the medieval period, Poland and Norway entered into alliances several times, incl. in 1315 and 1419. From 1389 to 1442, Eric of Pomerania of the House of Griffin was King of Norway as Eric III, and his tomb is located in his birth town of Darłowo in Poland. During the Hanseatic League, trade and cultural contacts developed between Polish cities on the Baltic Sea, mainly Gdańsk; and Bergen in Norway, where Polish ships reached with grain.

In the 17th century, during the Swedish Deluge, Polish troops led by Stefan Czarniecki fought together with soldiers from Denmark–Norway against the Swedish invasion in Poland and during the Dano-Swedish War. By the late 18th century, the third and final partition of Poland had occurred and Poland lost its independence for the next 123 years. Polish engineer and insurgent Aleksander Waligórski, who fled partitioned Poland after the unsuccessful November Uprising, co-developed Norway's first railroad and co-authored the first modern road map of Norway.

=== 20th century ===
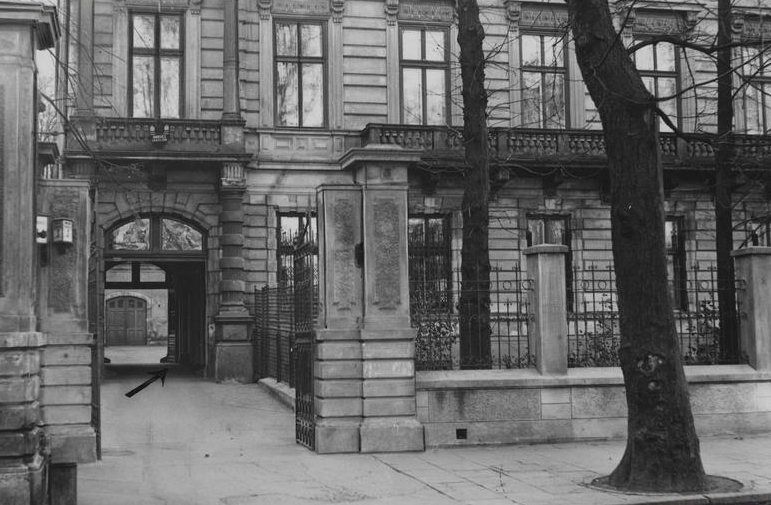
Embassy of Norway in Warsaw in 1934

In 1918, after World War I, Poland regained its independence, and both nations established diplomatic relations in 1919. However, political and governmental contacts were few in the interwar period, and economic cooperation and trade remained low. Honorary consulates of Poland were founded in Kristiania in 1922 (apart from the Embassy), in Tønsberg in 1925, and in Bergen and Stavanger in 1929, with all operating until the German occupation of Norway in 1940. In 1931 Poland signed the Svalbard Treaty, which recognizes the sovereignty of Norway over the archipelago of Svalbard in the Arctic Ocean, and grants signatories equal rights to engage in commercial activities and scientific research on the archipelago.

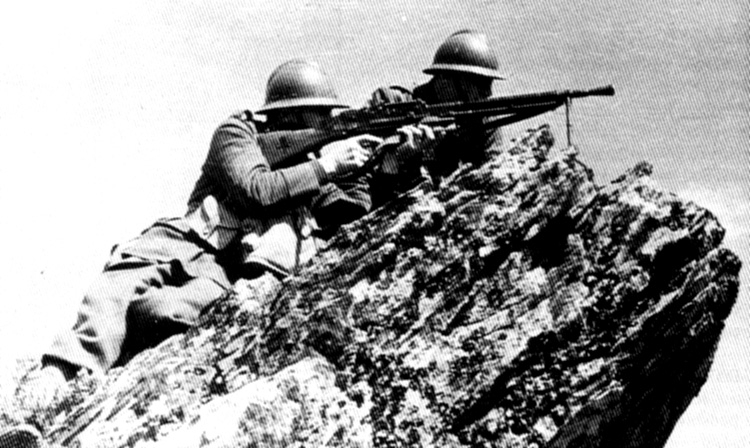
Soldiers from the Polish Independent Highland Brigade fighting during the Battles of Narvik, Norway; 1940.

During World War II, both countries were invaded by Germany. The Polish Independent Highland Brigade fought for Norway in the Battles of Narvik against German soldiers. During the war, both countries maintained close contacts as both had governments-in-exile based in London. Approximately 20,000 Poles were taken by the Germans from occupied Poland for forced labor in Norway, while some Norwegian prisoners of war were sent to German POW camps operated in occupied Poland, including Stalag XXI-C in Wolsztyn, Stalag 357 in Toruń, and most notably Oflag XXI-C in Ostrzeszów. Several Poles and Norwegians were among the victims of the Stalag Luft III murders, perpetrated by Germany in 1944. After liberation, Norway became a second home for some of the former Polish forced laborers.

Shortly after the end of World War II, Poland and Norway resumed diplomatic relations in 1945. In 1974, Norway's Prime Minister Trygve Bratteli paid an official visit to Poland.

During the Polish Solidarity movement; the Polish Trade Unions received support from Poles living in Norway, political emigrants, Norwegian politicians and trade unionists. The official visits of King Harald V of Norway to Poland in 1993 and the President of Poland, Lech Wałęsa, to Norway in March 1995; were an expression of the will of both countries to give their mutual relations the highest rank.

== Modern relations ==
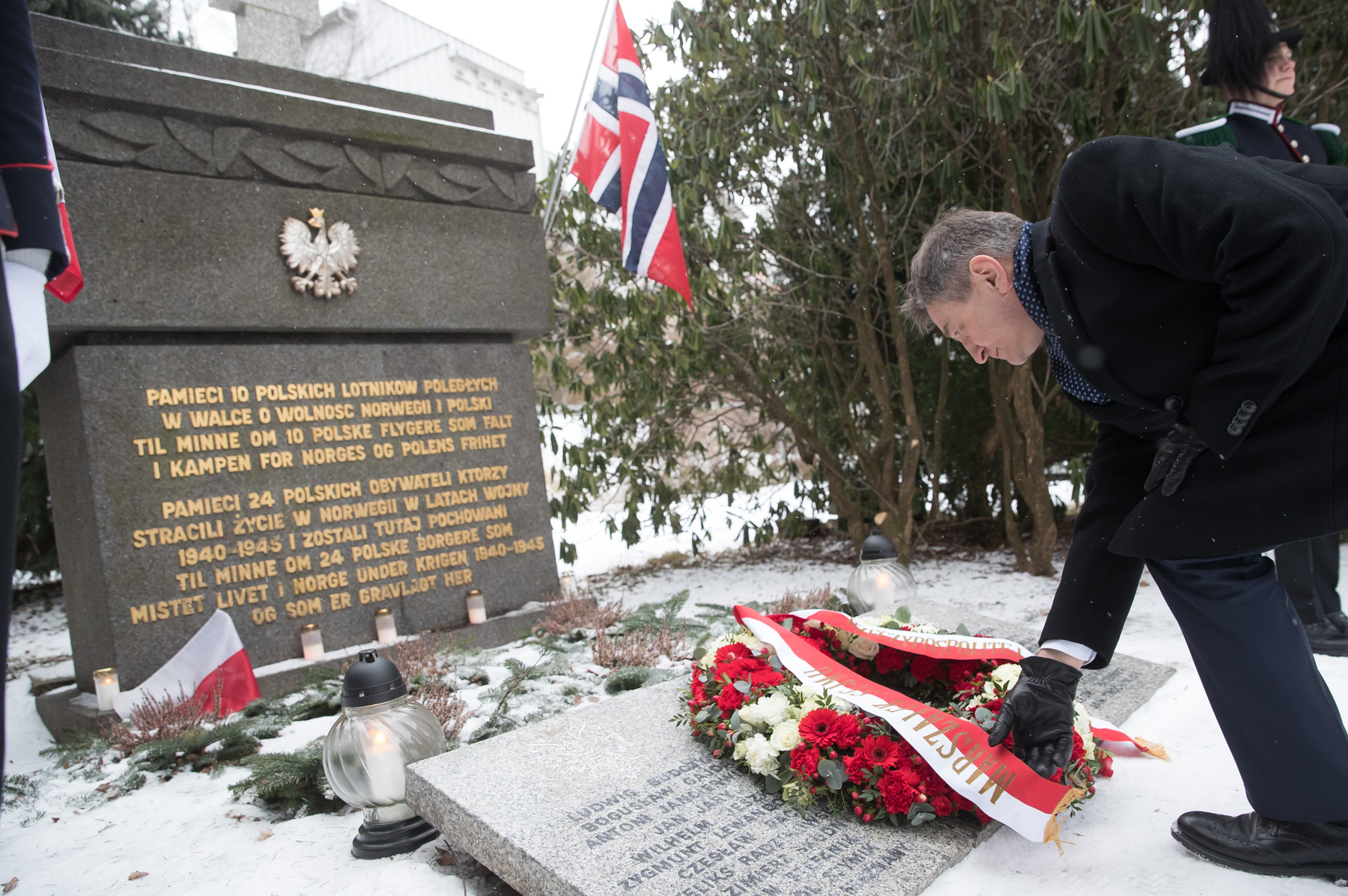
Marshal of the Sejm Marek Kuchciński lays a wreath at a grave of Poles killed by the Germans in Norway during World War II (2017)

Since Poland's accession to NATO in March 1999, Polish-Norwegian relations have become allied and bilateral political and military cooperation have strengthened between both nations. In 2012, King Harald V of Norway paid a second visit to Poland and in 2016, Polish President Andrzej Duda paid a state visit to Norway. Norway and Poland are close NATO allies, and their militaries cooperate as part of the Multinational Corps Northeast, headquartered in Szczecin, Poland.

Poland is one of Norway's ten main trading partners. In 2019, Poland was the seventh largest source of imports and the tenth largest export destination for Norway.

The Baltic Pipe, connecting Norway via Denmark to Poland, was commissioned in September 2022. Its purpose is to ensure natural gas supplies from Norway to Poland.

Several Polish polar stations are located in the Norwegian archipelago of Svalbard.

Norwegian students were the 13th largest group of foreign students in Poland in 2021, and the 11th largest in 2022, 2023 and 2024, at the same time being one of the largest groups from Europe. In the 2020–2021 academic year, the largest number of Norwegian students attended the Jagiellonian University in Kraków, and the medical universities of Gdańsk, Szczecin, Poznań, Białystok, Warsaw and Lublin.

On September 2020, Ine Marie Eriksen Søreide, the Norwegian Minister of Foreign Affairs, announced that the Polish municipalities which introduced the LGBT-free zones would be denied the EEA and Norway Grants whose aim is the reduction of social and economic disparities in the European Economic Area (EEA). Poland is the biggest beneficiary of these funds and could potentially lose millions of euros of financial aid. The suspension of funds only applies to the government bodies that have themselves adopted resolutions and does not apply to non-governmental organizations that operate in the LGBT-free zones.

== Culture ==
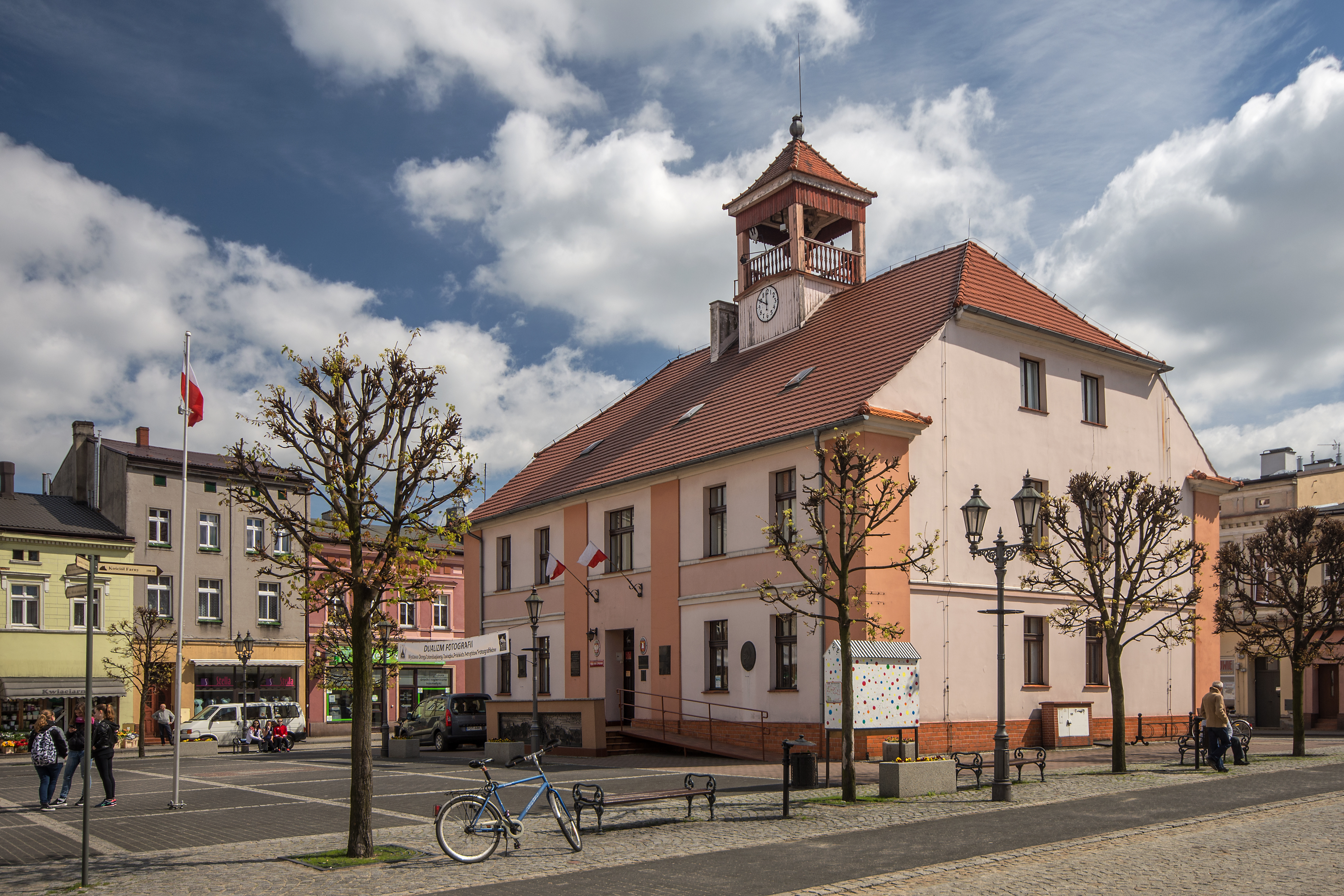
Ostrzeszów Town Hall, which houses the Regional Museum with an exhibition dedicated to Norwegian prisoners of war from World War II

There are Polish World War II memorials in Narvik and at Vestre gravlund in Oslo in Norway. The Władysław Golus Regional Museum in Ostrzeszów, Poland has an exhibition dedicated to the Norwegian prisoners of war held in the Oflag XXI-C camp by the German occupiers. In Żagań there is a memorial to the victims of the German-perpetrated Stalag Luft III murders, including Poles and Norwegians.

The medieval Our Lady of Częstochowa church in Darłowo, Poland contains the tomb of King Eric III of Norway. A unique cultural heritage monument of Norwegian origin in Poland is the Vang Stave Church in Karpacz, moved to its current location from Vang Municipality in Christians amt (county), Norway in 1842.

== Bilateral agreements ==
Both nations have signed a few agreements such a trade and shipping agreement (1926); conciliation and arbitration treaty (1929); tariff arrangement (1935); customs agreement (1937); trade and payment agreement (1946) and a trade agreement (1964). With Norway being a member of the European Free Trade Association and Poland being a member of the European Union, most bilateral relations between both nations are conducted through those two organizations.

== Resident diplomatic missions ==
- Norway has an embassy in Warsaw
- Poland has an embassy in Oslo.
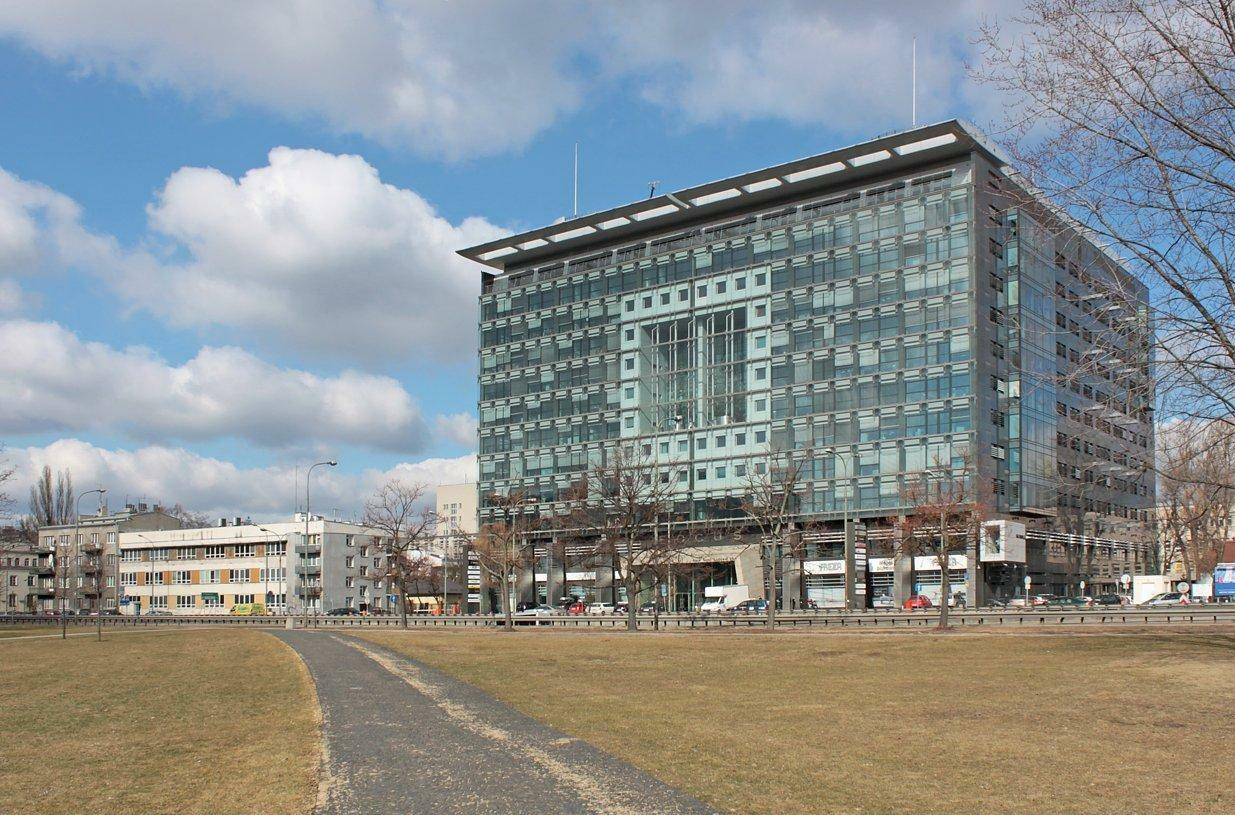
Building hosting the Embassy of Norway in Warsaw

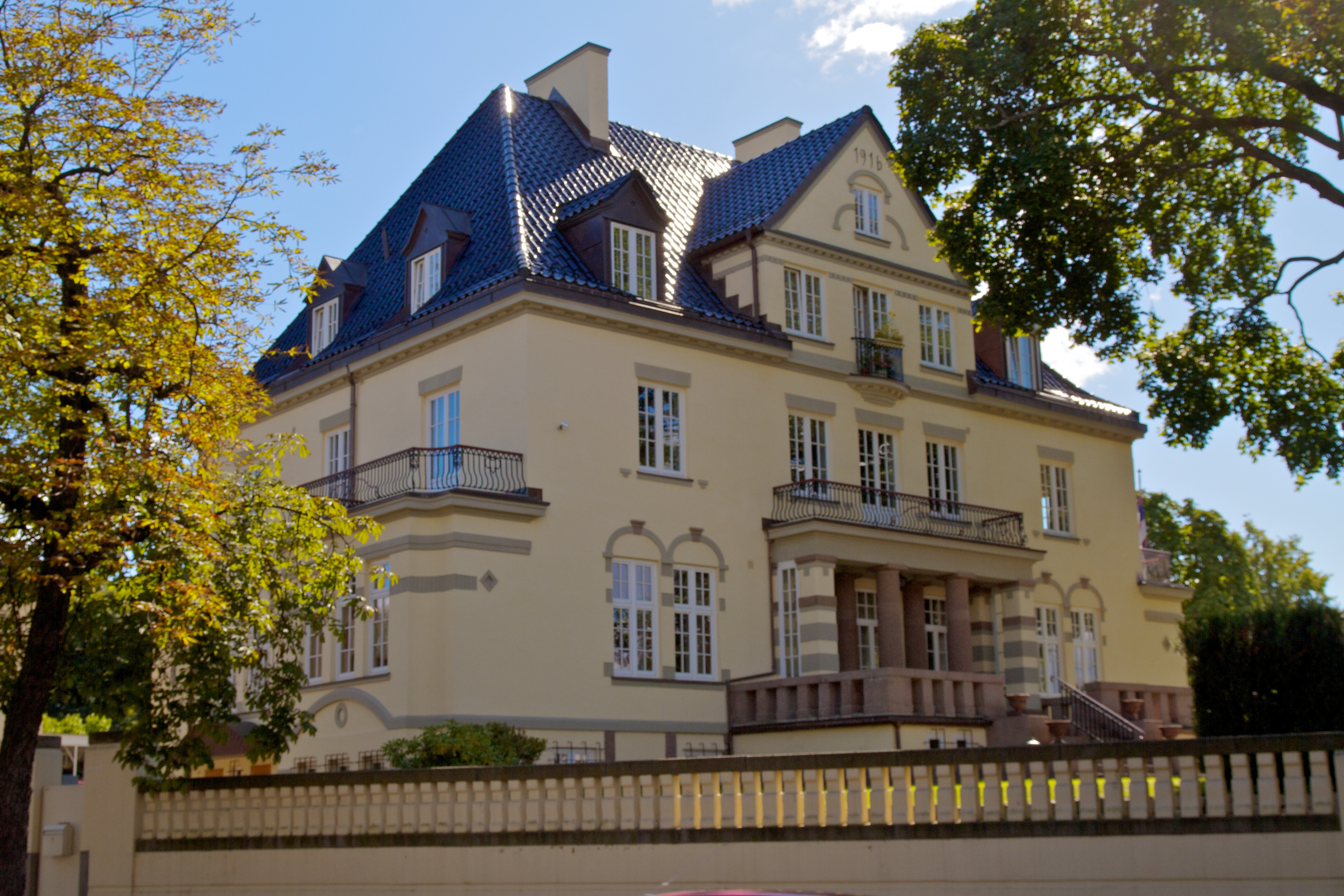
Embassy of Poland in Oslo

== See also ==
- Foreign relations of Norway
- Foreign relations of Poland
- Embassy of Poland in Oslo
- Baltic Pipe
- Poles in Norway
- Polish Independent Highland Brigade
