= Polish Army in France (1939–1940) =

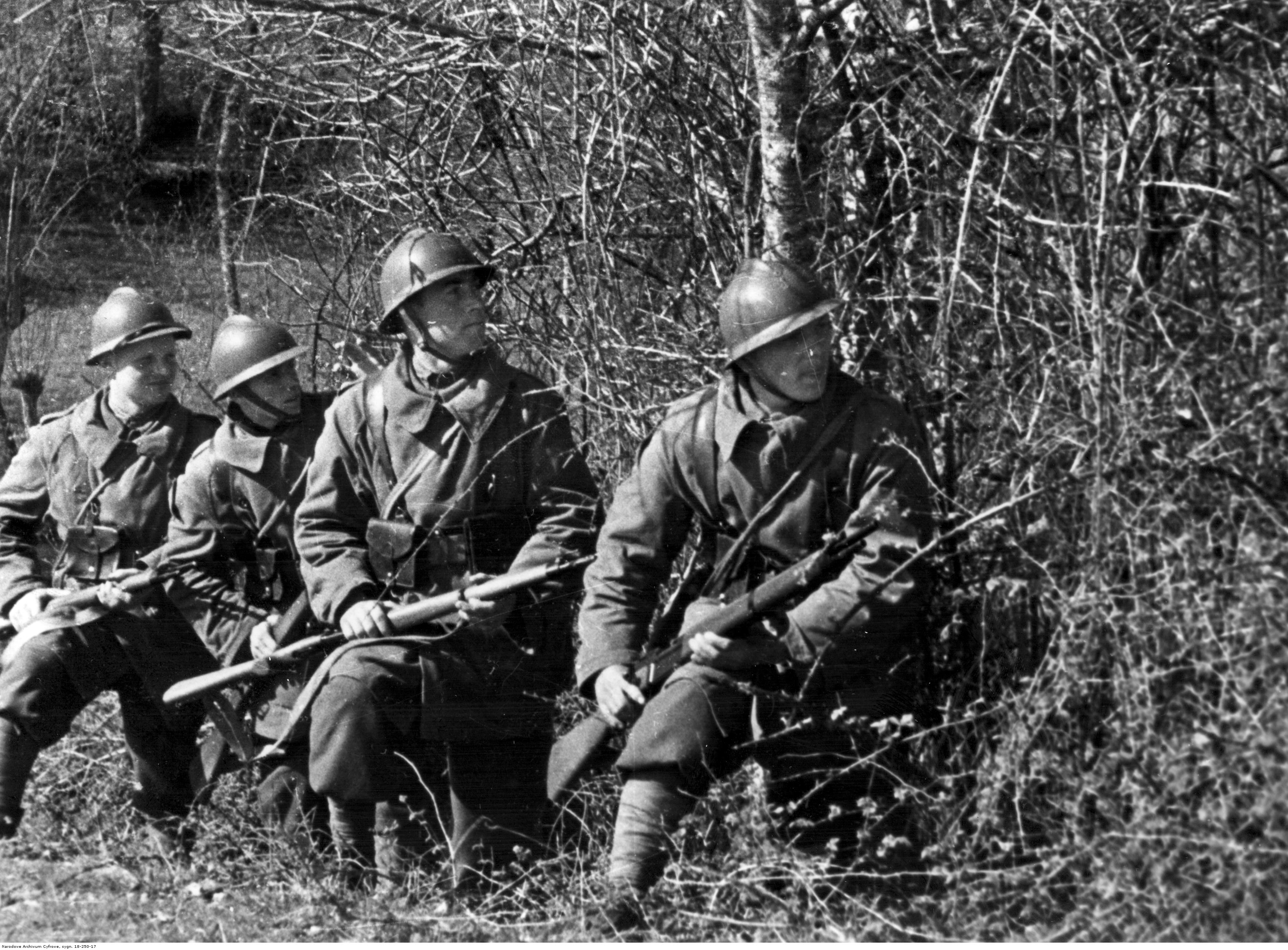
- Polish soldiers in training with MAS-36 rifles, France, 1940.
- Active: 1939–1940
- Country: Poland
- Allegiance: Poland; France
- Branch: Army
- Size: 84,461 (highest)
- Nickname: Sikorski's Army
- Engagements: Battle of France; Battles of Narvik

The Polish Army in France formed in France under the command of General Władysław Sikorski (and hence sometimes known as Sikorski's Army) in late 1939, after the fall of Poland resulting from the Polish Defensive War. About 85,000 troops were in the process of being organized into fighting formations (four infantry divisions, two independent brigades and air support) when the Battle of France started. The army was partially destroyed in the hostilities, but over 20,000 soldiers were evacuated and formed a new Polish army in the United Kingdom.

The creation of Polish formations in France marked the beginnings of the Polish Armed Forces in the West.

== Creation ==
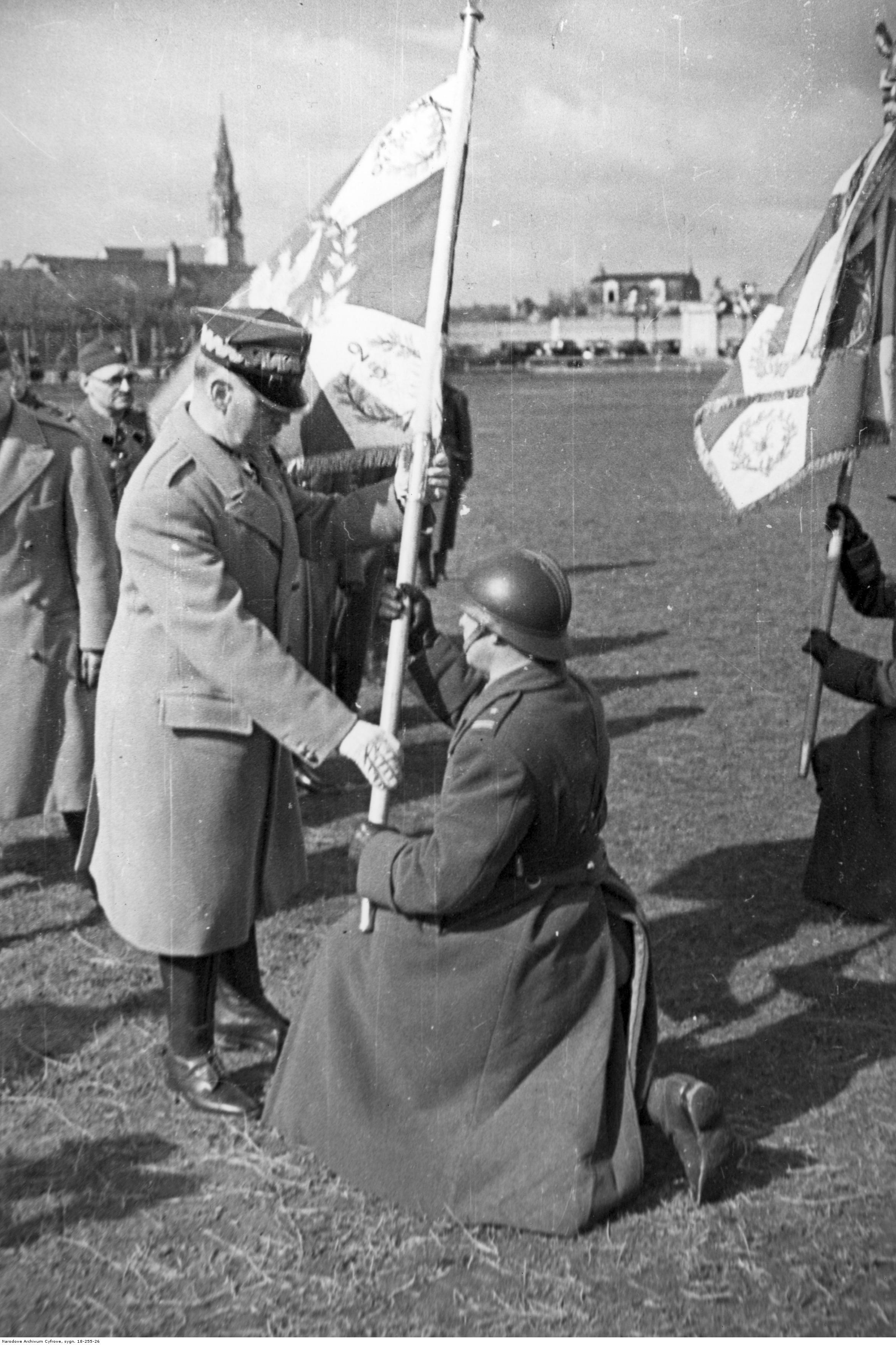
Wladyslaw Sikorski presents the banner for the Polish sapper unit in France.

The army began to be organized soon after the fall of Poland on October 6, 1939. France, a Polish ally, had formally declared war on Germany on September 3 in response to the invasion, but it had not yet undertaken any major operations against the Germans (see Phoney War) before the creation began. France welcomed the Polish refugees (as well as the Polish government in exile) and started organizing them into several military formations.

The main military camps for Polish formations were in Coëtquidan and Parthenay. The new army was partially recruited from Polish army personnel who escaped from occupied Poland and émigré volunteers. By May 1940, the army numbered about 80,000 personnel; about 45,000 of them were army escapees or former refugees, and the rest came from the Polish minority in France.

Inefficient French logistics and policies delayed the formation of Polish units by missing equipment and supplies. Consequently, by May 1940, only two infantry divisions, two independent brigades and one air squadron were able to become fully equipped and operational, with another two infantry divisions in the process of being completely formed. The Polish high command had planned for two full corps, an armoured division, and over fifteen air squadrons. Also, rear units were being formed, a Polish military academy and a cartographic institute. The Polish command also issued a document "Most Important Conclusions and Experiences from The September Campaign" ("Najważniejsze wnioski i doświadczenia z kampanii wrześniowej"), in which it analysed German blitzkrieg strategy and proposed some countermeasures, but it was ignored by the French High Command.

Polish Armed Forces in France
Growth of the personnel.

20 October 1939	1,900
10 January 1940	31,409
27 April 1940	68,423
15 June 1940	84,461

== Organization ==
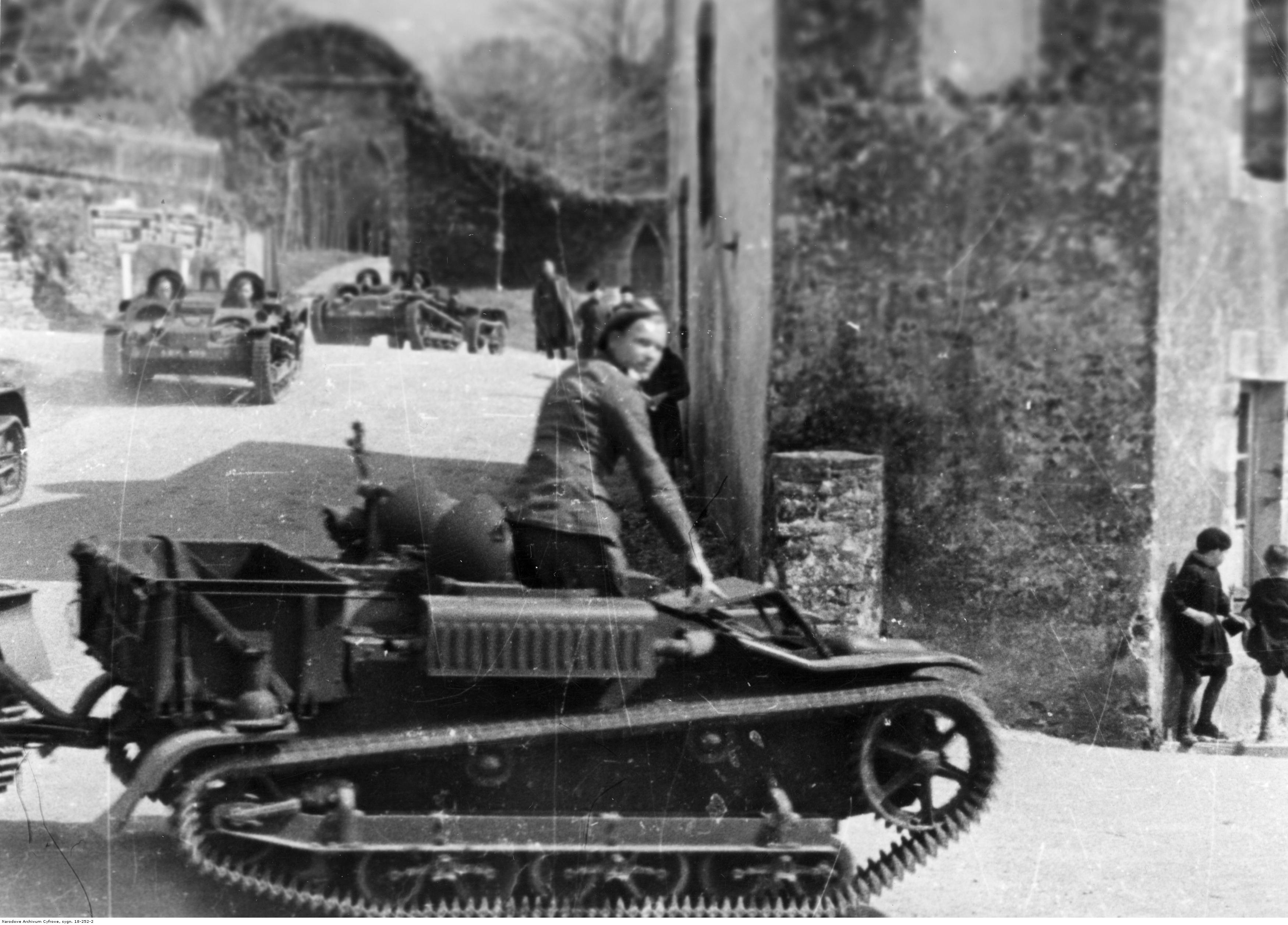
Polish Renault UE column in France, 1940.

=== Army ===
The following units were organised in mainland France

Four Polish divisions:

- 1st Grenadier Division
- 2nd Infantry Fusiliers Division
- 3rd Infantry Division
- 4th Infantry Division

a Polish motorized brigade:

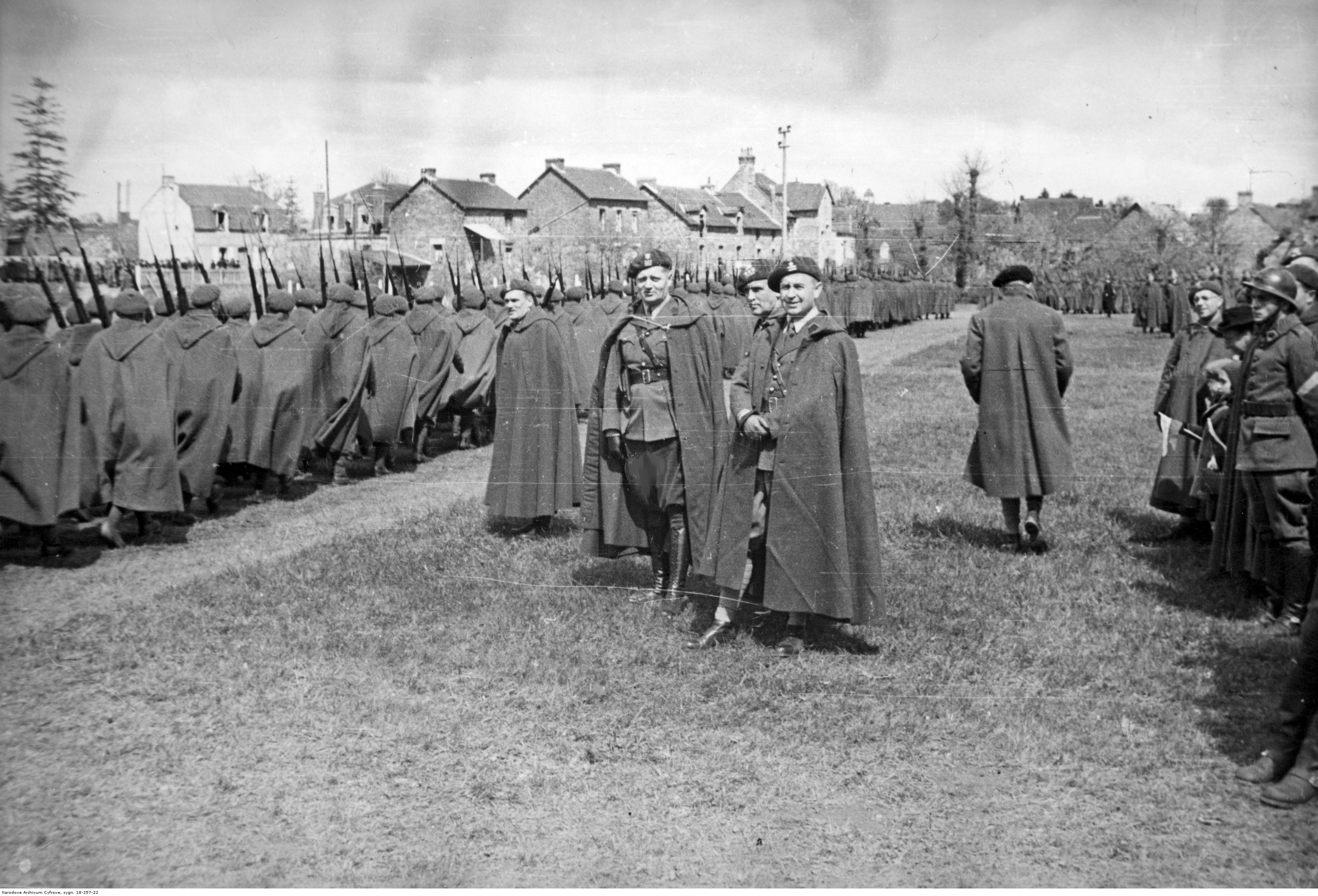
- The ceremony parade presenting the banner of the Independent Podhale Rifle Brigade, 1940.
  10th Armoured Cavalry Brigade (Poland) (10^{e} Brigade de cavalerie blindée)

and a Polish infantry brigade:

- Polish Independent Highland Brigade (Samodzielna Brygada Strzelców Podhalańskich)

In French-mandated Syria, a Polish Independent Carpathian Brigade was formed to which about 4,000 Polish troops had escaped, mostly through Romania and would later fight in the North African Campaign.

=== Navy ===
Polish Navy ships which left the Baltic during Operation Peking were attached to the Royal Navy of United Kingdom, not the French command, and as such are not considered as the part of the Polish armed forces in France.

=== Air force ===
The Polish Air Force in France comprised only one fighter squadron GC 1/145 "Warsaw". Other units were to be formed, but their pilots got assigned to French squadrons or territorial defence instead.

== Operations ==
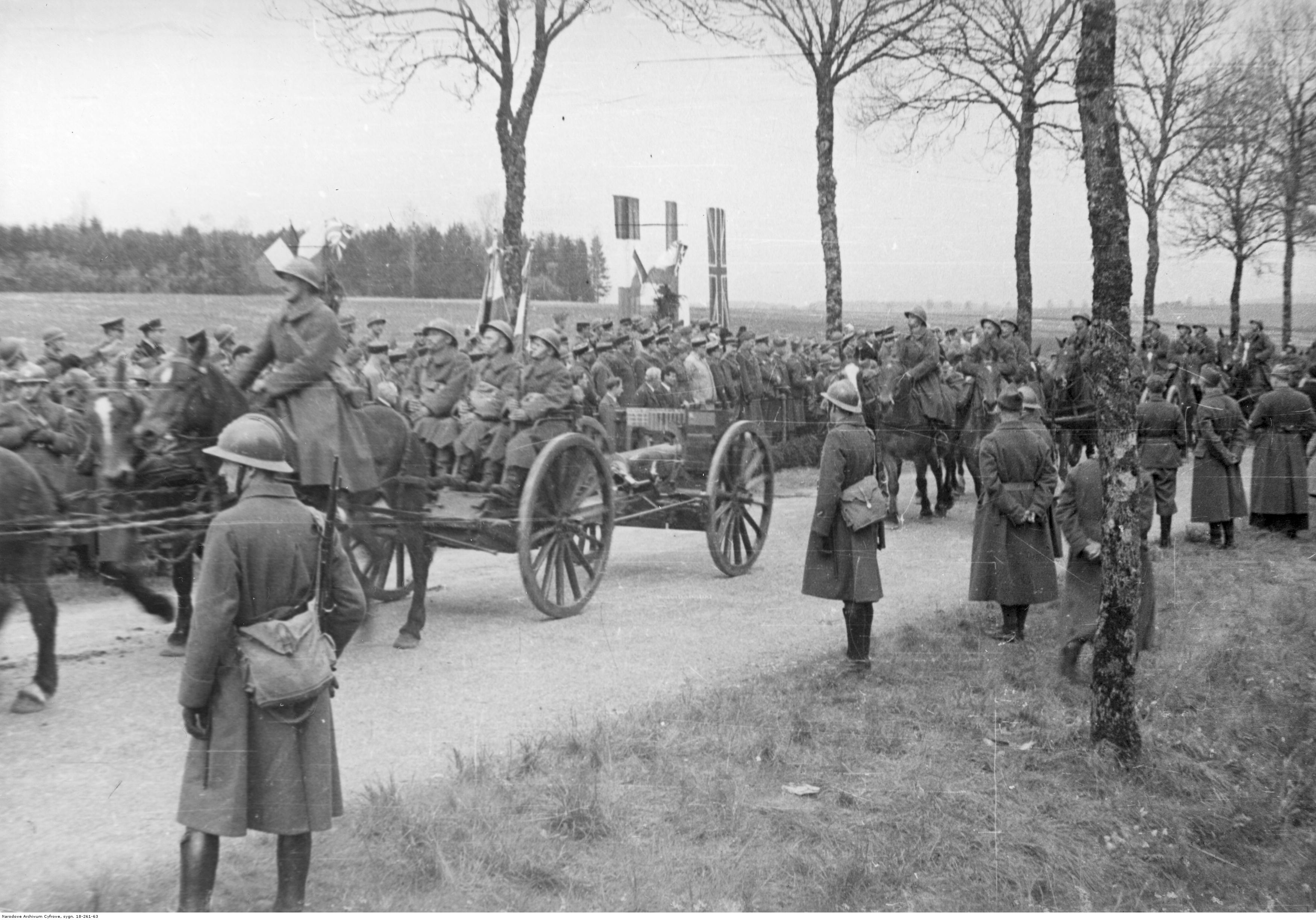
Parade of the light artillery of the 1st Grenadier Division of the Polish Army in France, May 3, 1940.

With the German invasion of France, at first only Polish armoured units were pressed in formation, but after the Germans broke through the French front, all Polish formations were moved to the front-line, although the units still had not received all of their equipment and supplies from the French logistics services. None of the units were completely equipped by the time they entered combat and particularly the 3rd and 4th divisions were still in the middle of organization. Polish units fought in the southern section of the front and all continued to fight despite Philippe Pétain’s call for an armistice and demobilization on 16 June. The Polish commander-in-chief, General Władysław Sikorski, on June 19, announced in a radio bulletin that Poland would continue to fight as an ally of the United Kingdom. Polish units were ordered to reach the French ports in the north, west and south in preparation for naval evacuation to Great Britain, or if that would prove impossible, to cross the Swiss frontier.

The First Grenadier Division (16,165 soldiers) under Bolesław Bronisław Duch was based in Lorraine, manning part of the Maginot Line from June 9 as part of the French 4th Army. It fought from 14 June. After two days, having withstood German assaults on its positions near Lagarde, it was forced to fall back, covering the retreat of the disintegrating French 52nd Division. On 21 June, with the collapse of the nearby French defences, General Duch ordered the unit to disband; many of the soldiers, including the general, were able to evacuate to United Kingdom.

The Second Infantry Fusiliers Division (15,830 soldiers) under Bronisław Prugar-Ketling was based between late December 1939 and May 1940 at Parthenay in Western France. Commanded by Brigadier-General Prugar-Kietling the division was charged with the defences around Belfort. Engaged in heavy fighting from June 17 to 19 near Doubs and Saône rivers, it stopped the German attack on the Clos-du-Doubs hills, but due to the retreat of the nearby French forces it was surrounded by the Germans; nonetheless, it managed to break through to Switzerland on 20–21 June 1940, where its soldiers (including General Prugar-Ketling) were interned.

The 3rd and 4th Infantry Divisions were still being formed when France capitulated and took relatively little part in the hostilities.

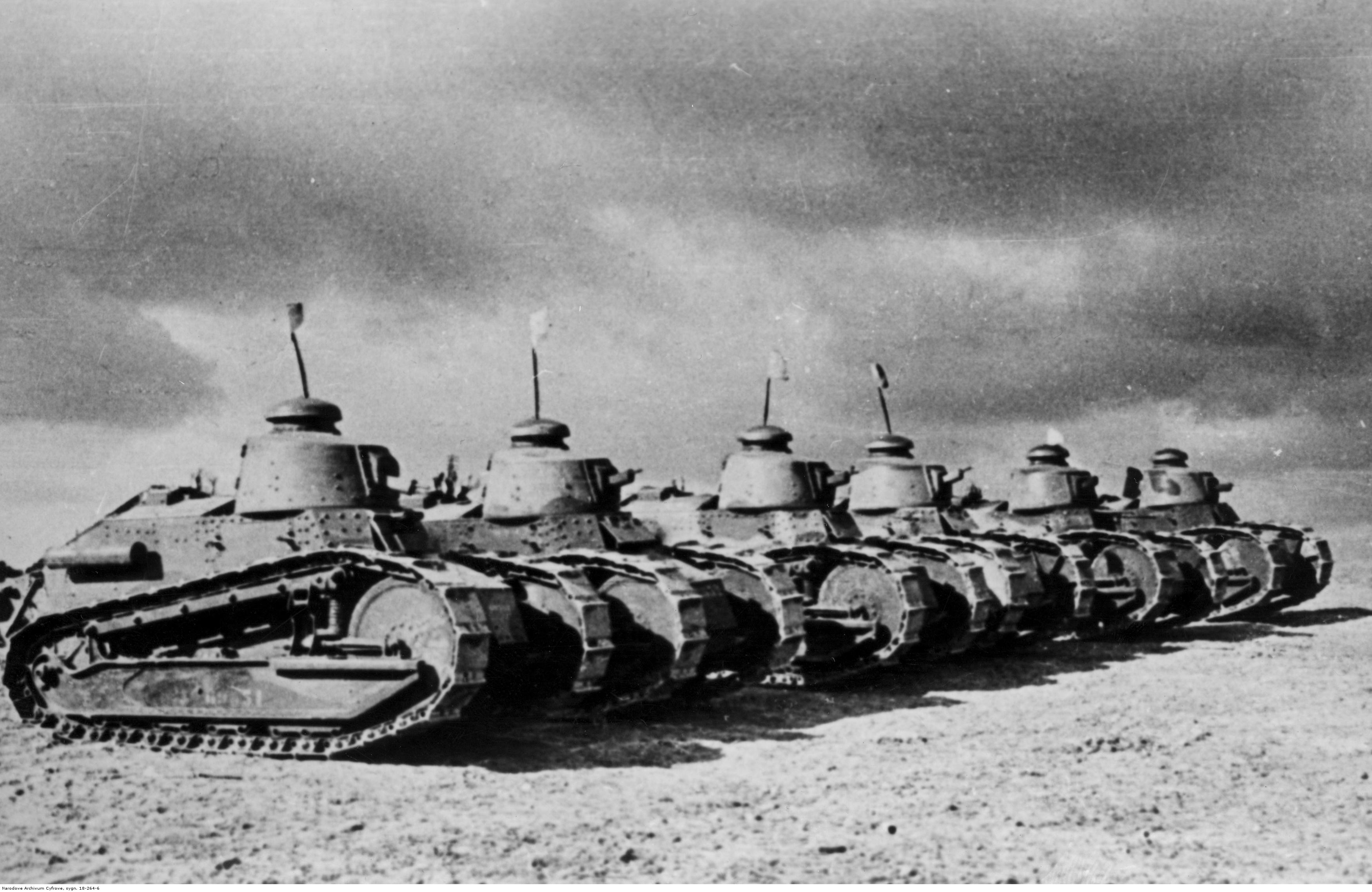
Renault FT tanks of the Polish Army in France, 1940.

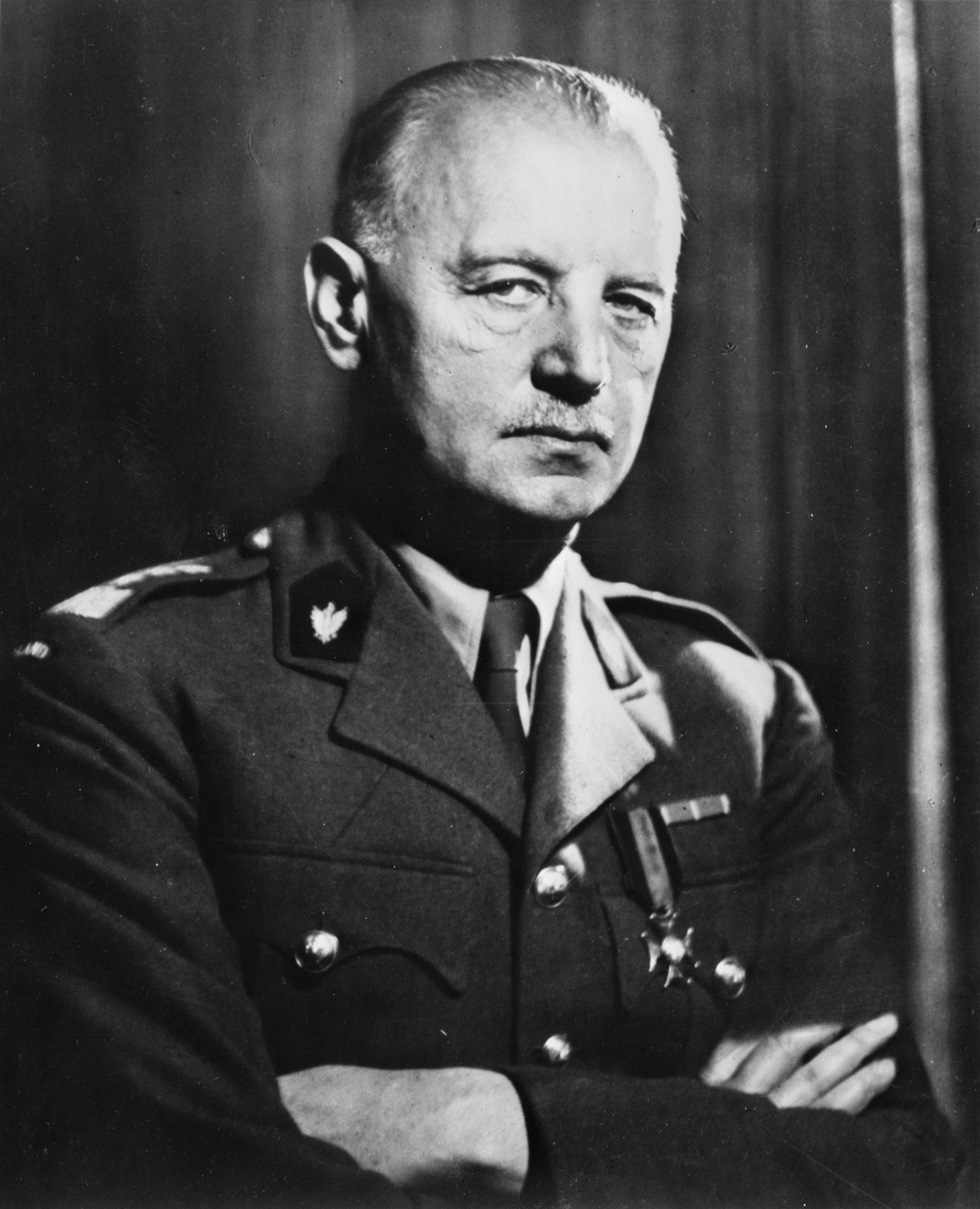
General Wladyslaw Sikorski, commander of the Polish Army in France.

The 10th Brigade of Armored Cavalry (1,079 soldiers) under General Stanisław Maczek fought in the Champagne and Bourgogne regions. It protected the flank of the 4th and 6th French Armies near Champaubert, northwest of Dijon, and on June 16 routed Germans near Montbard, but by then the brigade was fighting alone, with the French units on both flanks either routed or in retreat. By 18 June the unit was mostly surrounded and without fuel and ammunition. General Maczek ordered the destruction of the unit equipment and withdrawal; the unit would be later recreated under his command in United Kingdom as the Polish elite 1st Armoured Division; Gen. Maczek would be considered one of the best Polish – and armoured – commanders of the war.

The Polish Independent Highland Brigade (5,000 soldiers) under General Zygmunt Bohusz-Szyszko took part in the Battles of Narvik, Norway, in 1940 (28 May – 4 June). Returning to France, together with some formations quickly formed from the Polish recruits in the nearby training camps, it took part in the defence of Brittany. Disbanded, some of its soldiers (including General Bohusz-Szyszko) were evacuated to Britain and Egypt, while others joined the French resistance.

Polish Independent Carpathian Brigade (4,000 soldiers) under General Stanisław Kopański in Syria refused to follow the Vichy government and joined British troops in nearby Palestine.

== Polish Air Force in France ==
The Polish Air Force fought in the Battle of France as one fighter squadron GC 1/145 "Warsaw". A creation of other units was not completed, but sixteen flights of Polish pilots and ground crew were detached to French fighter squadrons, and took part in combat. Further ten flights and two bigger escadrilles were assigned for territorial defence. There were plans to organize a bomber squadron and reconnaissance squadron, but it was too late to accomplish. At the same time, further Polish Air Force squadrons were created in Great Britain. From 6,932 Polish Air Force members in France, approximately 230 pilots and twice as much ground crew participated in fighting.

Polish pilots in France participated in shooting down some 50-55 aircraft – according to Polish official wartime statistics (Bajan's list), it was 50.9 victories (46 by the Polish and 10 shared with the French). According to new research by B. Belcarz, there were 34 aircraft shot down by the Polish only, and 19 shared with the French – 53 in total, what constitutes 7.93% of total French victories. Only 9 pilots were killed in action (more pilots and crew died in different accidents, bombing etc.). After the fall of France, most crew evacuated to Great Britain, where they joined the Polish Air Force there. Apart from typical French fighter aircraft, like Morane-Saulnier MS.406, Dewoitine D.520, Bloch MB.152, Curtiss H.75, Polish pilots flew Caudron C.714 and Koolhoven F.K.58.

== Aftermath ==
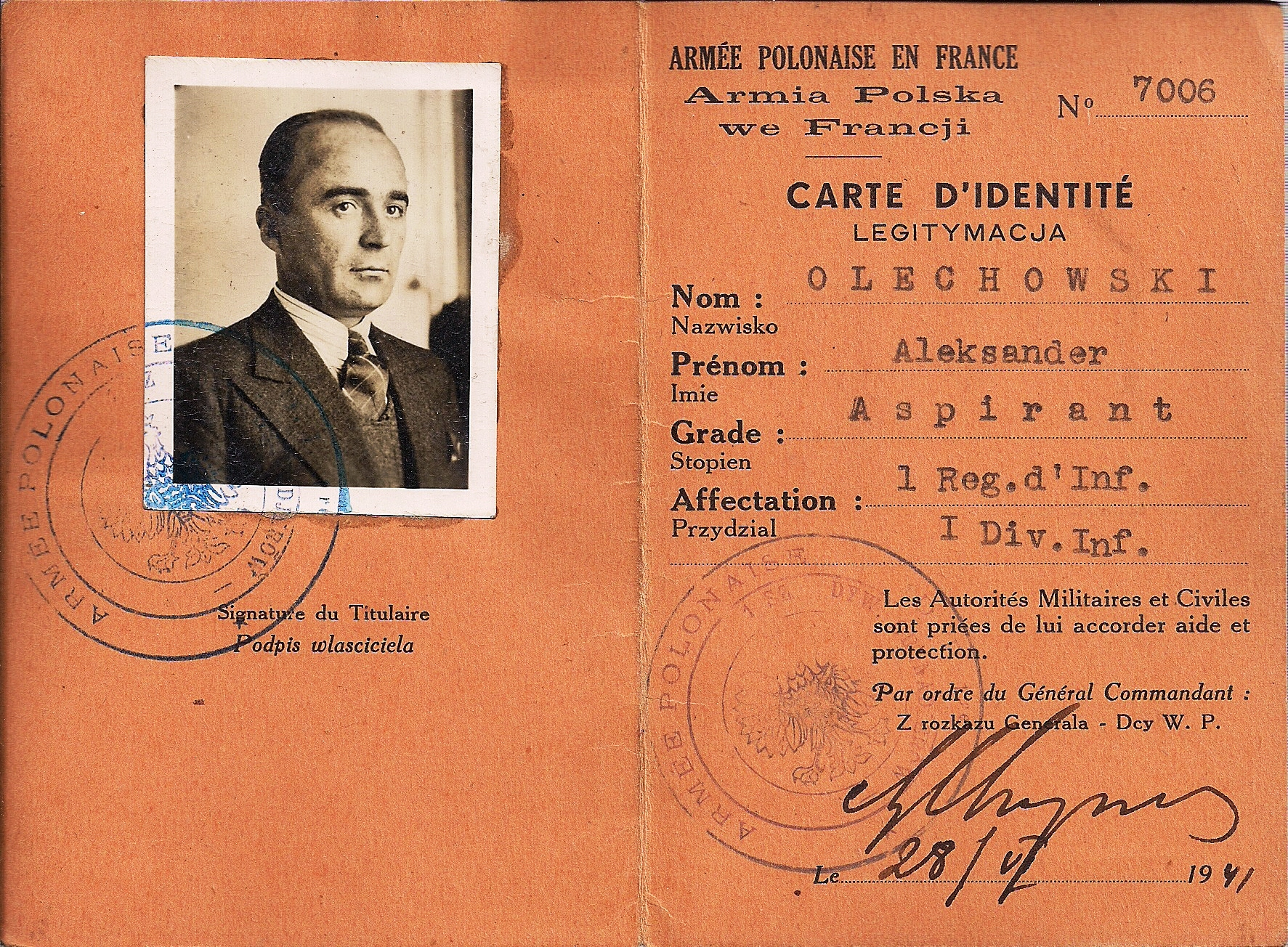
Polish Armed Forces ID, Vichy France 1941.

About 55,000 of the 85,000 Polish soldiers in France were in formations organized enough to fight the Germans. 1,400 Polish soldiers died fighting in the defence of France, 4,000 were wounded, 16,000 were taken prisoner, and about 13,000 Polish personnel were interned in Switzerland. General Władysław Sikorski, Polish commander-in-chief and prime minister, was able to evacuate many Polish troops to the United Kingdom (estimates range from about 20,000 to 35,000), where a new Polish army was formed. Many soldiers with ties to France opted to remain in occupied France and join the French resistance (see Polish resistance in France during World War II).

== See also ==
- Polish Legions (Napoleonic period)
- Blue Army (Polish Army in France in World War I)
