= Battle of Jaworów =

1939 battle of the German Invasion of Poland in World War II

Coordinates: 49°50′N 23°33′E

- Part of Invasion of Poland, World War II
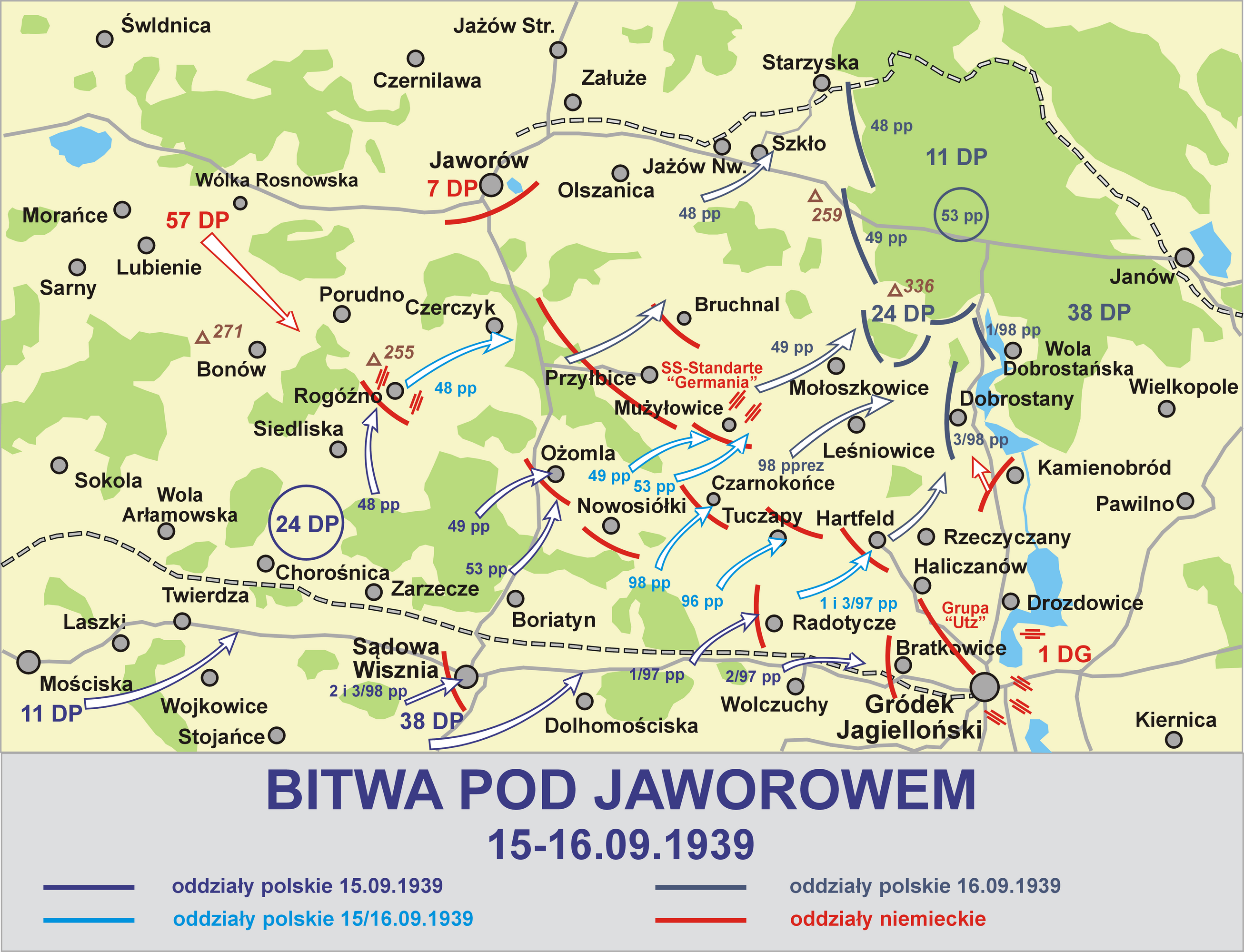
- Map showing Polish attacks during the battle
Date	14–16 September 1939
Location	Jaworów, Lwów Voivodeship, Poland (present-day Yavoriv, Ukraine)
Result	Polish victory

Belligerents
Germany	Poland

Commanders and leaders
(Nazi Germany) Willibald Utz (Nazi Germany) Karl Demelhuber	(Second Polish Republic) Kazimierz Sosnkowski

Units involved
(Nazi Germany) XVII Army Corps: SS-Standarte Germania regiment; 7th Infantry Division; (Nazi Germany) XVIII Army Corps: 2nd Mountain Division; 1st Mountain Division; 57th Infantry Division	(Second Polish Republic) Polish "Southern Front": 11th Infantry Division; 24th Infantry Division; 38th Infantry Division

The Battle of Jaworów (Polish: bitwa pod Jaworowem) was fought between the German forces and elements of the Polish Małopolska Army during the German Invasion of Poland. It took place from 14 to 16 September 1939 in the vicinity of the town of Jaworów. In the effect of a two-day assault, the Polish forces broke through the German line of defence on their way towards the city of Lwów (modern Lviv). The engagement is best known for the destruction of one battalion of three battalions of SS-Germania regiment together with the capture of the heavy equipment of the entire regiment.

The battle resulted from a chaotic situation in the rear of Małopolska Army. Although the army, since 13 September commanded by General Kazimierz Sosnkowski, maintained a high morale and remained in relatively good fighting condition during the first two weeks of the war, a string of retreats seriously depleted its forces.

Sosnkowski's aim was to break through towards the city of Lwów. To make the matter worse for the Poles, a large detachment of German motorised and mountain infantry units, composed of the 7th Infantry Division, elements of 1st Mountain Division and the SS-Standarte Germania regiment, outflanked the Polish forces and organised a defence line between the towns of Jaworów and Gródek Jagielloński, directly between the Małopolska Army and Lwów, with German 2nd Mountain Division closing in from behind and the 57th Infantry Division approaching from the north.

On 15 September, the Polish force, formed by 11th, 24th and 38th Infantry Divisions, reached the area between Mościska and Sądowa Wisznia. From there the Poles attacked the forward positions of the German units. In a lengthy night assault of the German main position the Polish forces broke through to a large forest complex extending to the north and west of the town of Janów and dominating the road between Przemyśl and Lwów.

Although losses were high on the Polish side, they were much higher for the Germans. The SS-Germania regiment lost most of its artillery, vehicles and practically ceased to exist. Its remnants were withdrawn from the front and then disbanded. Meanwhile, the Polish force organised the defence of the forest complex and fought the Battle of Janow Forests.

== Prelude ==
Under orders from General Kazimierz Sosnkowski, the 11th ("Carpathian"), 24th and 38th Infantry Divisions were advancing toward the forests near Janów (present day Ivano-Frankov) to enter Lwów.

Under the command of Colonel Bronisław Prugar-Ketling, the Carpathian Infantry Division was advancing on the left flank, formed into two columns. The first column consisted of the 49th Hutsul Rifle Regiment and Riflemen of the 53rd Kresy Regiment who were marching in the front. The other column, approaching from a different direction, was made up of the 48th Kresy Regiment. A night attack was planned for the division to take over the western edge of the forest. Meanwhile, the 38th ID was attacking on the right flank from two different directions in the north. The regiment of SS-Standarte Germania, (predecessor of SS Viking), a mechanized unit, and the 1st Mountain Division were defending against the attack.

== The battle ==
The battle started with an engagement initiated by the 49th battalion. Polish infantry took a part of the forest and the villages of Szumlaki and Ozmola. At 2100, Muzylowice was captured. The Germans lost a significant number of men, artillery, tractors and cars. However, because the infantry units did not have any extra crews trained to man the captured equipment, the booty was destroyed. The German losses were so significant that one of three battalions making up the SS-Standarte Germania was wiped out, most of their heavy equipment was destroyed. The Polish generals were surprised at how much equipment was destroyed and how much was captured still in operational condition.

In the meantime, the 48th Infantry Regiment attacked and took Rozgozno; several POWs were taken, as were six anti-tank guns, a battery of light artillery, and an unknown number of trucks. The same regiment took over Czerczyk and the hunting lodge where the road from Jaworów forks to Sądowa Wisznia and Przyłbice.

The 38th Regiment entered the combat with a delay because of the heavy bombardment and bad coordination of the rear elements of the 24th Regiment. The Tabor (a type of mobile fortification), of the 24th was inadvertandly left in the way of the advancing 38th Regiment. Only by 2100 were Czarnokonce and Rodatycze taken. The Germans put up tough resistance only in the village of Hartfeld; however, two Polish battalions succeeded in taking it. Some POWs were taken; trucks, fuel tankers and other captured equipment was destroyed. The 98th Regiment continued to attack and reached Dobrostany.

In the north, the Poles achieved a decisive victory. The German commander of the 14th Army pulled the SS Germania from the battle because it suffered heavy losses and lost the majority of its vehicles and heavy equipment. In the south, however, the German Group "Utz" from the 1. Mountain Division held their positions.

In the secondary offensive, the 24th Infantry Division, after an all-night march, reached the forest north of Moloszkowicze.

On 16 September, the Germans created a rear reinforcement formation. The commander of the 1st Mountain Division formed the "Pemsel" combat group. "Pemsel" was to cut off the route to Lwów by attacking in the direction of Dobrostany and Jaryn. A Polish infantry battalion did repel the German counter-attack at Dobrostany, destroying several heavy guns and armored cars. However, the 38 ID were spread too thinly during the initial attack and many of its component parts lost contact. The commander made incorrect decisions based on a false picture of the battlefield. Nevertheless, six battalions got through to Janów.

General Kazimierz Sosnkowski set up his HQ in the forests near Berdyczow and told his forces to focus their defensive efforts on the western flank. With the benefit of hindsight, General Sosnkowski wrote that the success of the Polish infantry in the battle was due to the foot soldiers being the best organized, commanded and trained within the entire Southern Front.

== Aftermath ==
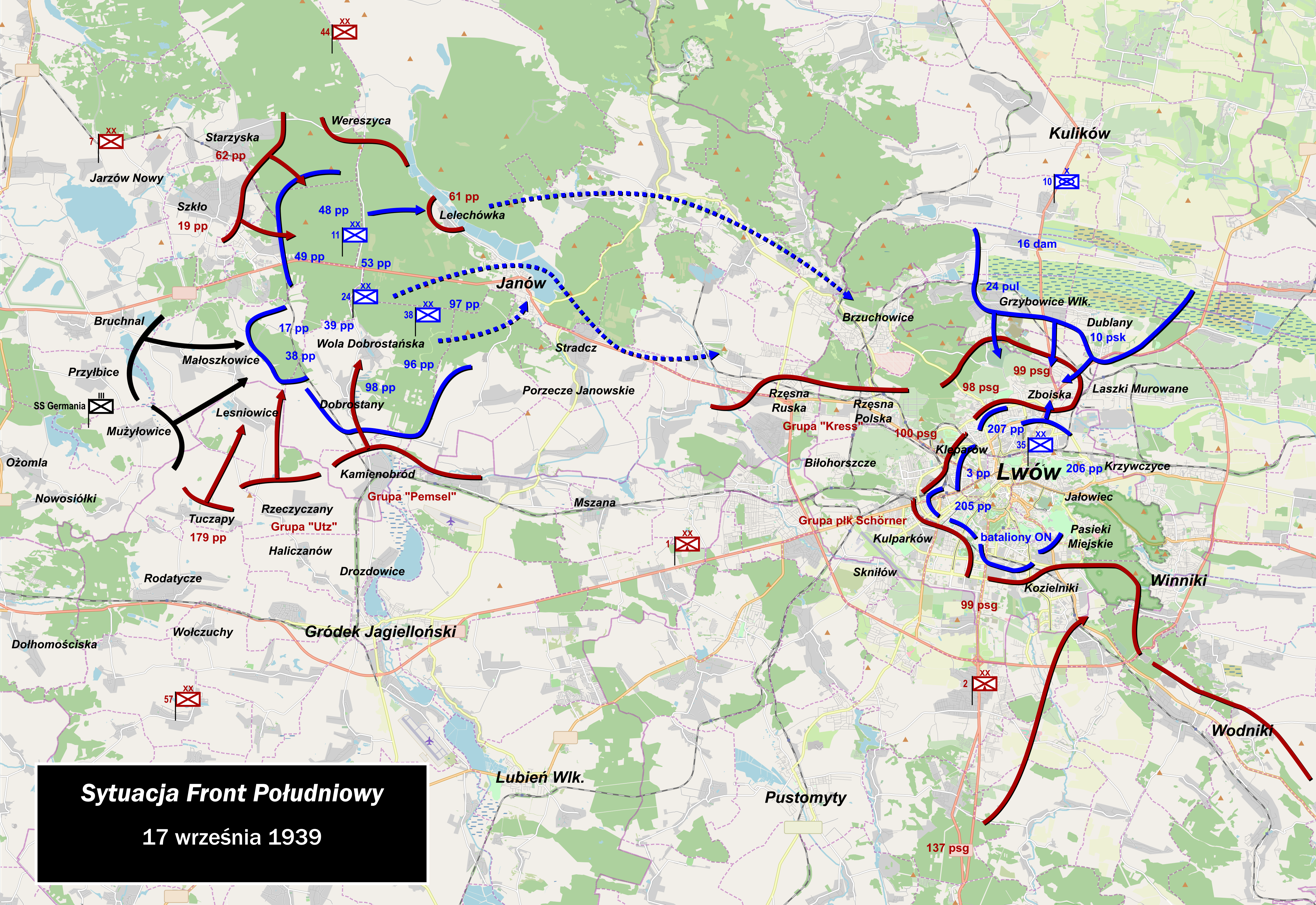
Situation of the Polish Southern Front near the Lwow region, 17 September 1939

=== Poles ===
The day after the battle, the Soviets invaded Poland from the east. Breaking through to Lviv became unrealistic, since the town was encircled by the united forces of Nazi Germany and the Soviet Union. Some soldiers were taken prisoner and sent to German and Soviet POW camps. Others were executed by the Soviets, while some participated in the battles around Lublin, a few crossed the so-called Hungarian Bridgehead (named after the Romanian Bridgehead was cut off by the Soviets) and reached either France, where they continued to fight in 1940, or the UK, and fought alongside British Commonwealth forces.

=== Germans ===
German officers and NCOs of the SS Germania were not permitted to lead German troops into battle again (except for a few when the Soviets gained the upper hand). Instead, they were assigned to lead a foreign volunteer division known as SS Viking.

== See also ==
- 49th Hutsul Rifle Regiment
- List of World War II military equipment of Poland
- List of German military equipment of World War II

== See also ==
- Battle of Lwów (1939)
