= Embassy of Poland, Oslo =

Diplomatic institution in Norway

Ambasada Rzeczypospolitej Polskiej w Oslo Embassy of the Republic of Poland in Oslo
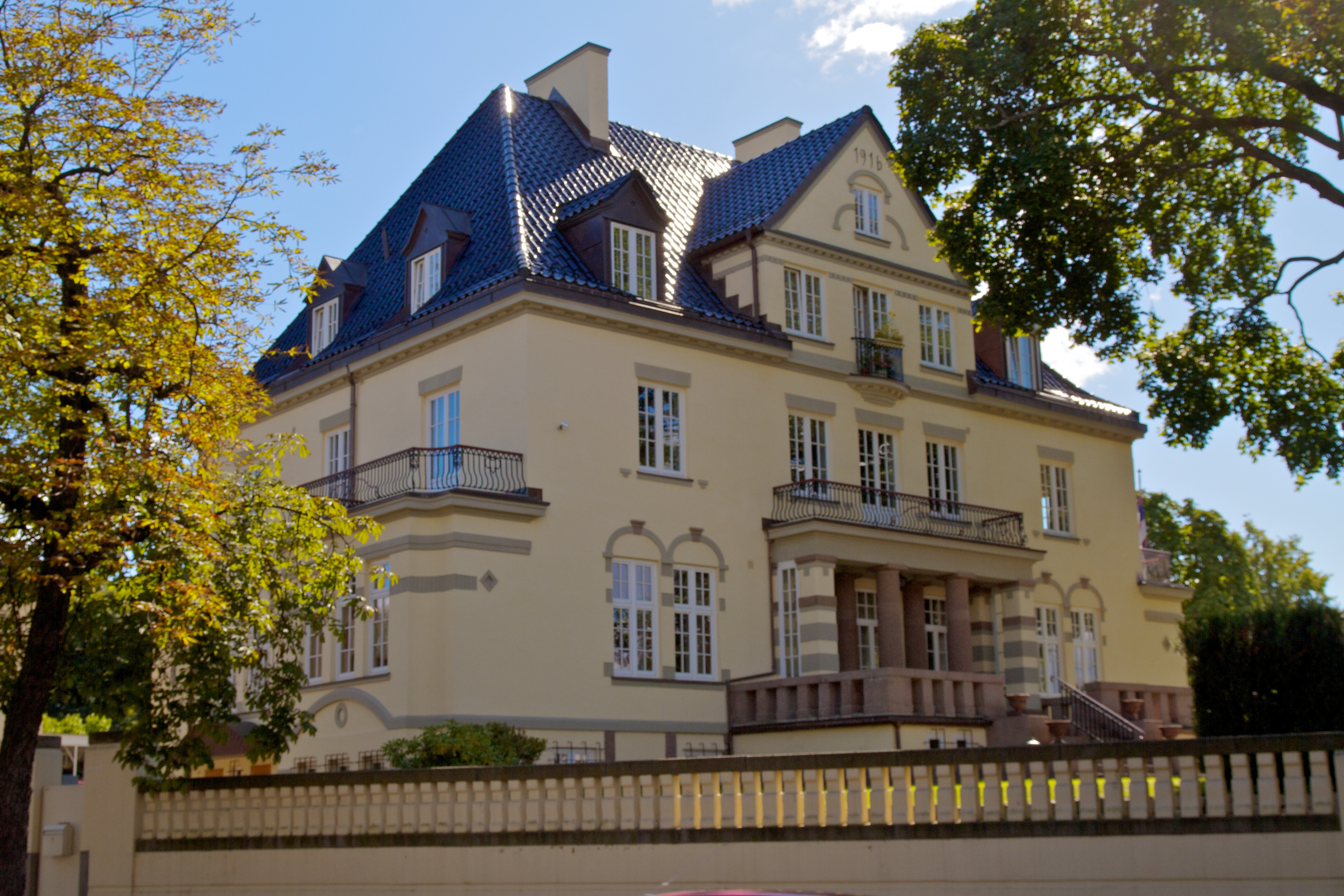
- Location: Olav Kyrres Plass, Oslo, Norway
- Address: Olav Kyrres Plass 1, 0244 Oslo
- Coordinates: 59°55′08″N 10°41′46″E
- Ambassador: Małgorzata Kosiura-Kaźmierska

The Embassy of Poland in Oslo is the diplomatic mission of the Republic of Poland to the Kingdom of Norway. The chancery is located at Olav Kyrres Plass 1, Oslo.

The main chancery of the Polish embassy in Oslo is located on the Olav Kyrres Plass in the Frogner district of Oslo. The building is a traditional grand Norwegian style residence with a tent roof and a large sculpted portico. The portico itself is supported by a pair of large red marble columns. The Polish embassy's political section is based in this building, however the consular section is located on Drammenveien 171, 0277 Oslo.

== See also ==
- Norway–Poland relations
