= Zygmunt Bohusz-Szyszko =

Polish general (1893–1982)

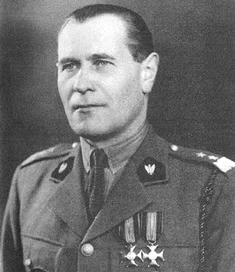
- Born: 19 January 1893; Chełm, Lublin Governorate, Vistula Land, Russian Empire
- Died: 20 June 1982 (aged 89); London, United Kingdom
- Military career
- Allegiance: Russian Empire; Poland; Polish government-in-exile
- Rank: Divisional general

Zygmunt Piotr Bohusz-Szyszko (1893 in Chełm – 1982 in London) was a Polish general. During World War I he served in the Imperial Russian army.

In 1940, he was Commanding Officer Polish Independent Highland Brigade (Samodzielna Brygada Strzelcow Podhalanskich) during the Battle of Narvik in the Norwegian campaign. The forces under his command succeeded in capturing the Ankenes peninsula during May 1940.

== Biography ==
Bohusz-Szyszko was born on 19 January 1893 in Chełm. His father Jakub was an officer in the Imperial Russian Army, and served in the Polish–Soviet War. His family moved to Russia after his father was transferred to the Irkutsk garrison.

== Career ==
During his career, he held the following offices:

- -1931 Commanding Officer 58th Regiment
- 1931–1934 Commanding Border Defence Regiment Głębokie
- 1934–1938 Deputy General Officer Commanding Border Defence Corps
- 1938–1939 Commanding Officer Infantry 1st Division
- 1939 Commanding Officer Infantry 16th Division
- 1939–1940 Commanding Officer 1st Mountain Brigade, Norway
- 1941–1942 Head Polish Military Mission Moscow
- 1941–1943 Chief of Staff Polish Forces in Soviet Union
- 1942 General Officer Commanding 5th Division, Soviet Union
- 1943–1945 Deputy General Officer Commanding II Polish Corps, Italy
- 1945–1946 General Officer Commanding Army of the East
- 1945–1946 General Officer Commanding II Polish Corps, Italy
- 1976–1980 General Inspector of the Armed Forces

== Promotions ==
- Podporucznik (Second lieutenant) - 1914
- Porucznik (First lieutenant) - 1916
- Major (Major) - 3 May 1922
- Podpułkownik (Lieutenant colonel) - 23 January 1928
- Pułkownik (Colonel) - 1 January 1934
- Generał brygady (Brigadier general) - 19 April 1940
- Generał dywizji (Major general) - 1 June 1945

== Awards and decorations ==
- Golden Cross of Order of Virtuti Militari
- Silver Cross of Order of Virtuti Militari (1922)
- Grand Cordon of Order of Polonia Restituta (30 March 1979)
- Officer's Cross of Order of Polonia Restituta (11 November 1936)
- Cross of Valour (four times)
- Golden Cross of Merit with Swords (two times)
- Golden Cross of Merit (7 August 1938 and 11 November 1938)
- Bronze Medal for Long Service
- Wound Decoration (six times)
- War Cross (Norway)
- War Cross of Military Valor (Italy)

== In culture ==
Bohusz-Szyszko was portrayed by Zbigniew Stryj in Red Poppies, a war film following the Battle of Monte Cassino.
