= 2nd Rifle Division (Poland) =

- 2 Dywizja Strzelców Pieszych
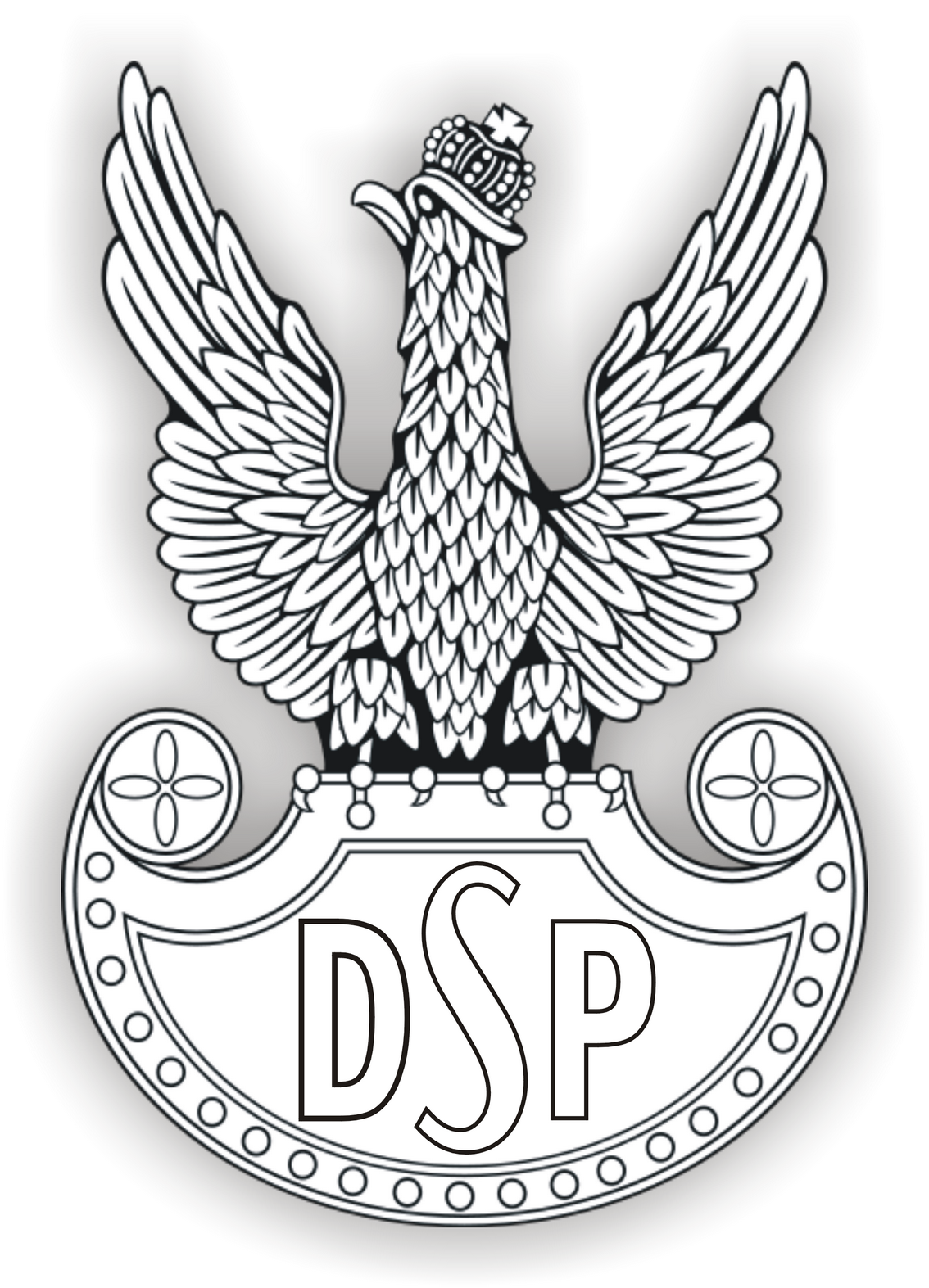
- Insignia
- Active: 1939–1940 (1944)
- Country: Poland
- Branch: Polish Army
- Part of: XXXXV Corps
- Engagements: World War II: Battle of France

Commanders
- Notable commanders: Bronisław Prugar-Ketling

The 2nd Rifle Division (Polish: 2 Dywizja Strzelców Pieszych, French: 2e Division des Chasseurs or 2e Division d'Infanterie Polonaise) was a Polish Army unit, part of the recreated Polish Army in France in 1940.

The division (numbering 15,830 soldiers) was commanded by Brigadier-General Bronisław Prugar-Ketling, and was based from late December 1939 to May 1940 at Parthenay in Eastern France. Under Prugar-Ketling the division was charged with holding the defences around Belfort, Alsace. Assigned to part of the French reserves, 45th Corps. Engaged in heavy fighting from June 17 to 19 near the Doubs and Saône rivers, it stopped a German attack on the Clos-du-Doubs hills. but due to the (unknown to the Poles) rapid retreat of the nearby French forces it was surrounded by the Germans; nonetheless it managed to break through to Switzerland over 20–21 June 1940, where its soldiers were interned for the rest of the war, although many "escaped" back into France and eventually made their way to England to rejoin the Polish forces there. In Henri Guisan's defense plan for a German invasion of Switzerland, the 2nd Rifle Division would be rearmed and fight alongside the Swiss forces.

On 8 May 1945, the war in Europe came to an end. The 2nd Infantry Rifle Division was disbanded. Nearly half of the internees returned with their commander Gen. Prugar-Ketling to their homeland. The rest feared a return to Poland ruled by the communists. Many of the soldiers, having left Switzerland, ended up in France, Britain, Australia or the United States. About one thousand of them remained in Switzerland.

== Organization ==
Structure of the division:

- Chief of Staff, 2nd Polish Infantry Division
  - 4th Polish Infantry Regiment
  - 5th Polish Infantry Regiment
  - 6th Polish Infantry Regiment
  - 2nd Polish Artillery Regiment
  - 202nd Polish Heavy Artillery Regiment
