= List of ship decommissionings in 1959 =

The list of ship decommissionings in 1959 includes a chronological list of all ships decommissioned in 1959. In cases where no official decommissioning ceremony was held, the date of withdrawal from service may be used instead. For ships lost at sea, see list of shipwrecks in 1959 instead.

	Operator	Ship	Class and type	Fate	Other notes
15 January	United States Navy	Cape Esperance	Casablanca-class escort carrier	Sold to be scrapped	
January	(United States) Military Sea Transportation Service	Windham Bay	Casablanca-class aircraft transport	Scrapped	
February	Royal Navy	Warrior	Colossus-class aircraft carrier	Sold to Argentina	Renamed ARA Independenia
15 May	United States Navy	Leyte	Essex-class aircraft carrier	Placed in reserve; scrapped in 1970	
21 August	Royal Norwegian Navy	Otra	Minesweeper	Scrapped	Laid up until stricken in April 1963
21 August	Royal Norwegian Navy	Rauma	Minesweeper	Scrapped	Laid up until stricken in April 1963
Date uncertain	Royal Norwegian Navy	Tor	Sleipner-class destroyer	Scrapped	Rebuilt as frigate in 1948
Date uncertain	Royal Norwegian Navy	Odin	Sleipner-class destroyer	Scrapped	Rebuilt as frigate in 1948
Date uncertain	Royal Norwegian Navy	Gyller	Sleipner-class destroyer	Scrapped	Rebuilt as frigate in 1948
Date uncertain	Royal Norwegian Navy	Sleipner	Sleipner-class destroyer	Scrapped	Rebuilt as frigate in 1948
