= HNoMS B-5 =

Norwegian B-class submarine

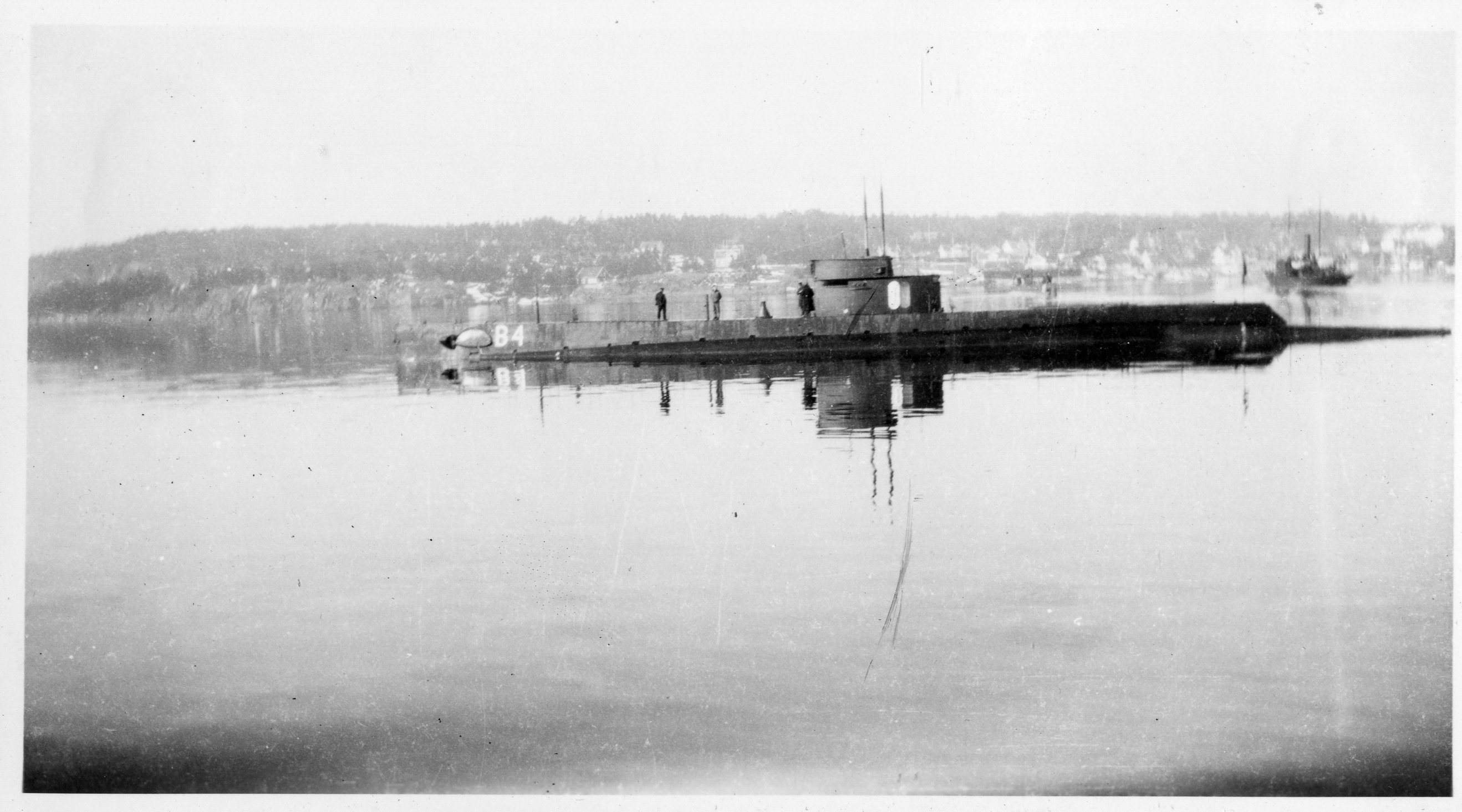
- Norwegian submarine B-4 which looked identical to her sister ship B-5

History

Norway
- Name: HNoMS B-5
- Builder: Horten Navy Yard, Oslo
- Yard number: 116
- Laid down: December 1925
- Launched: 17 June 1929
- Commissioned: 1 October 1929
- Fate: Captured at Kristiansand on 9 April 1940 and enlisted in the Kriegsmarine

Service record as HNoMS B-5
- Part of: First Naval Defense District, Second Submarine Division; 1 October 1929 – 9 April 1940
- Commanders: Kommandør Y. Brekke; 1 October 1929 – 9 April 1940
- Operations: None
- Victories: None

Nazi Germany
- Name: UC-1
- Acquired: 9 April 1940
- Commissioned: 20 November 1940
- Decommissioned: 28 March 1942
- Fate: Broken up in 1942

Service record as UC-1
- Part of: U-boat Defense School; June 1941 – March 1942
- Identification codes: M 10 850
- Commanders: Kptlt. / K.Kapt. Wilhelm Kiesewetter; 20 November 1940 – May 1941; Kptlt. Georg Lange; May – 14 October 1941; Oblt.z.S. Otto Wollschläger; 15 October – 16 November 1941; Kptlt. Georg Lange; 17 November 1941 – 28 March 1942; Lt.z.S. Karl Brockmann (acting); December 1941 – 28 March 1942
- Operations: None
- Victories: None

General characteristics
- Type: Norwegian B-class submarine Submarine
- Displacement: 365 t (359 long tons) surfaced; 545 t (536 long tons) submerged
- Length: 51 m (167 ft)
- Beam: 5.3 m (17 ft)
- Draught: 3.5 m (11 ft)
- Propulsion: 2 × Sulzer 900 shp (670 kW) diesel engines; 2 × 700 shp (520 kW) electric engines
- Speed: 15 knots (28 km/h) surfaced; 8.9 knots (16.5 km/h) submerged
- Range: 2,900 nmi (5,400 km) at 9 kn (17 km/h) surfaced; 150 nmi (280 km) at 3 kn (5.6 km/h) submerged
- Test depth: 50 m (160 ft)
- Complement: 23
- Armament: 2 × 45.6 cm (18.0 in) torpedo tubes (bow); 2 × 45.6 cm (18.0 in) torpedo tubes (stern); 1 × 76 mm (3.0 in) L.28 Bofors gun; 2 x Reserve torpedoes (4 in total)
- Notes: Carried 21 tons of diesel fuel

HNoMS B-5 was a Norwegian B-class submarine which was captured by an E-boat of the Nazi Germany's Kriegsmarine during Operation Weserübung on 9 April 1940 at Kristiansand, Norway. After which she was renamed UC-1 and used as a school boat for the Kriegsmarine before she was deemed unsuited for reserve training and was broken up in 1942.

== Construction ==
HNoMS B-5 was laid down in December 1925 at the Horten Navy Yard in Oslo, Norway. She was launched on 17 June 1929 and commissioned on 1 October 1929 under the command of Kommandør Y. Brekke.

When she was completed, the submarine was 51 metres (167 ft 4 in) long overall, with a beam of 5.3 metres (17 ft 5 in) and a draught of 3.5 metres (11 ft 6 in). She was assessed at 545 t (536 long tons) submerged. The submarine was powered by two Sulzer diesel engines producing a total of 900 metric horsepower (660 kW; 890 shp) for use while surfaced and two electric engines producing a total of 700 metric horsepower (510 kW; 690 shp) for use while submerged. The submarine had a maximum surface speed of 15 knots (28 km/h; 17 mph) and a maximum submerged speed of 8.9 knots (16.5 km/h; 10.2 mph) when submerged, the Submarine could operate for 150 nautical miles (280 km; 170 mi) at 3 knots (5.6 km/h; 3.5 mph) and when surfaced, she could travel 2.900 nautical miles (5.371 km; 3.337 mi) at 9 knots (17 km/h; 10 mph).

The submarine was fitted with two 45.6 cm (18 in) torpedo tubes at the bow and two at the stern holding four torpedoes with two as reserve. The boat had a complement of 23 men.

== Operation Weserübung and Capture ==
HNoMS B-5 was part of the Norwegian naval forces at Kristiansand which consisted of her along with her sister ships in the 2nd Submarine Division HNoMS B-2 and HNoMS B-4. The 3rd Torpedo boat Division consisting of the old torpedo boats HNoMS Jo, HNoMS Grib, HNoMS Lom, HNoMS Ravn and HNoMS Ørn, along with the 2nd Torpedo boat Division consisting of the old torpedo boats HNoMS Skarv, HNoMS Teist and the modern torpedo boat HNoMS Kjell. The 10th Auxiliary Division consisting of the auxiliary patrol vessels HNoMS Kvik, HNoMS Blink and HNoMS Lyn as well as the 11th Auxiliary Division made up of the auxiliary patrol vessels HNoMS William Barents, HNoMS Firern, HNoMS Lyngdal, HNoMS Hval IV, HNoMS Hval VI and HNoMS Hval VII. The Sleipner-class destroyers HNoMS Odin and HNoMS Gyller were also present in the harbor at the time. The commanding officer at Kristiansand was Kommandør Severin Edward Wigers.

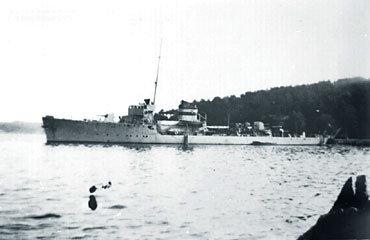
HNoMS Odin in 1939

On the morning of 9 April 1940, German troops invaded Denmark and Norway under the code name Operation Weserübung. A German invasion force named landing force number four consisting of the German light cruiser Karlsruhe (which served as a troop transport for 1,000 soldiers), an E-boat tender along with six other E-boats and four large torpedo boats including Luchs, Greif and Seeadler, which had left Bremerhaven, Germany on April 8, were tasked to capture Kristiansand. The invasion force could only attempt to enter the harbor in the morning of April 9 because there had been a heavy fog obscuring the city the previous day which would have made the passage into the fjord and therefore the harbor too dangerous.

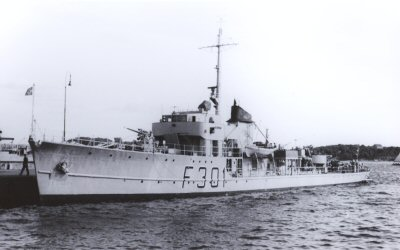
HNoMS Gyller in May 1953

When the invasion force led by the German light cruiser Karlsruhe finally entered the fjord at 5 am, they immediately came under heavy fire from the Norwegian coastal guns stationed at Odderøya Fortress. The sound of the first attack alarmed the Sleipner-class destroyers HNoMS Odin and HNoMS Gyller both of which sprang into action with HNoMS Odin steaming out into the Toppdalsfjord to open up fire against the newly attacking Luftwaffe bombers (which were targeting the fortress and the civilian neighborhoods of the city) with her Oerlikon 20 mm cannon and two 12.7 mm anti-aircraft machine guns while HNoMS Gyller joined in on the defense against the Luftwaffe attack with her single Bofors 40 mm gun and two Colt 12.7 mm anti-aircraft machine guns. Both ships managed to evade the bombs dropped from the German aircraft but weren't able to shoot down any planes, only damaging a couple.

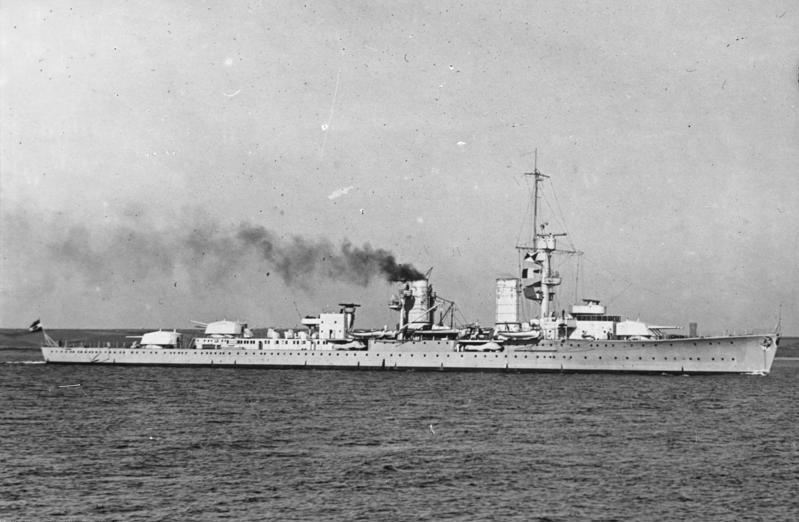
Karlsruhe in 1931

Karlsruhe however hadn't just sat idly by either as when the barrage against her was launched from the Odderøya Fortress, she turned in the fjord in order to bring her full broadside into the action. At about 07.30 am a twin-engined aircraft attacked the interned German submarine U-21 which was docked in Kristiansand harbor after having been seized by Norwegian warships for neutrality violations on 27 March 1940 after it had run aground on the Oddene shallows near Mandal. HNoMS Odin opened fire at the aircraft which was suspected to be part of the previous Luftwaffe attack. However it was quickly discovered that the aircraft was instead a RAF Lockheed Hudson reconnaissance aircraft, HNoMS Odin immediately ceased fire after it had luckily yet succeeded in hitting the aircraft.

Meanwhile, the German invasion force had been in an artillery duel with the Odderøya Fortress for nearly two hours with the Norwegians being able to repel two of their breakthroughs attempts until a heavy fog covered the harbor just like the day before, forcing both sides to cease fire. During the ceasefire, the Norwegian commander received message in Norwegian code ordering him not to fire at any British or French forces in response to the previous incident with HNoMS Odin. It also stated that French destroyers were coming to the aid of the stricken Norwegian force at Kristiansand.

These orders were relayed to the Norwegian forces at 10 am while HNoMS Gyller, after having received an orientation on the situation from the commander of the Odderøya Fortress, steamed out to the harbor entrance and swung out her torpedo tubes in order to greet any incoming intruders with a single ticket to the bottom of the fjord. However, when the order of the Norwegian commander was received, confusion spread through the ranks of the defenders as when the fog cleared, there was uncertainty over which flags were flown by the intruding warships. The defenders at the Odderøya Fortress even confused one of the signal flags for the French flag which meant that the guns from the fortress went silent, not risking firing at their allies again. The Norwegian defenders ended up letting the German force enter the harbor unopposed on their third attempt and land their troops in Kristiansand at 10.30 am.

A naval signal flag which could have been mistaken as the French flag

HNoMS Gyller had in the meantime returned to the harbor and was docked at Tollbodbrygga wharf in order to refill her water tanks for an upcoming battle, instead she was captured there by German forces without a fight. Kristiansand surrendered at 5 pm that same day along with all defending Norwegian forces. All vessels of the Norwegian naval force stationed in Kristiansand surrendered on 11 April 1940 at Marvika naval station including HNoMS Odin and HNoMS B-5 which had been captured by a German E-boat two days earlier without seeing action at the defense of Kristiansand.

== Kriegsmarine Career and End ==
After her capture, HNoMS B-5 was brought to Fiskå and renamed UC-1 on 20 November 1940. After her renaming, HNoMS B-5 was modified to be used as a school boat (U-Abwehrschule) for the German Kriegsmarine in Gotenhafen. Her modification was completed in June 1940 and remained in service until 28 March 1942 when she was ultimately deemed unsuited for reserve training and was broken up later that same year.

== Bibliography ==
- Abelsen, Frank (1986). Norwegian naval ships 1939–1945 (in Norwegian and English). Oslo: Sem & Stenersen AS. ISBN 82-7046-050-8.
