= HNoMS Tor (1939) =

History

Norway
- Name: Tor
- Namesake: Thor – god of thunder in Norse mythology
- Builder: Fredrikstad Mekaniske Verksted in Fredrikstad (hull); Karljohansvern naval yard in Horten (completion)
- Yard number: 128
- Laid down: November 1938
- Launched: 7 September 1939
- Fate: Scuttled by own crew to prevent capture by the Germans

Nazi Germany
- Name: Tiger
- Namesake: Panthera tigris
- Acquired: 16 April 1940
- Commissioned: 13 June 1940
- Fate: Handed back to Norway after VE Day

Service record
- Part of: 7th Torpedo Boat Flotilla; (June 1940–December 1940); 27th U-boat Flotilla; (December 1940–end of the war)
- Commanders: Kapitänleutnant Herbert Juttner; (June 1940–June 1941); Oberleutnant zur See Friedrich Nose (June 1941–?)
- Operations: Occupation of Norway by Nazi Germany (1940)

Norway
- Name: Tor
- Acquired: May 1945
- Decommissioned: 1959
- Fate: Sold for scrap

General characteristics as built
- Class & type: Sleipner-class destroyer
- Displacement: 735 tons
- Length: 74.30 m (243.77 ft)
- Beam: 7.75 m (25.43 ft)
- Draught: 4.15 m (13.62 ft)
- Propulsion: Two De Laval geared turbines with two shafts and 12,500 hp
- Speed: 32 knots (59.26 km/h)
- Range: 3,500 nautical miles (6,482.00 km) at 15 knots (27.78 km/h)
- Armament: Not yet fitted when scuttled
- Notes: Norwegian data retrieved from

General characteristics in German service
- Class & type: none
- Displacement: 708 tons
- Length: 74.10 m (243.11 ft)
- Beam: 7.75 m (25.43 ft)
- Draught: 2.82 m (9.25 ft)
- Propulsion: Two De Laval geared turbines with two shafts and 12,500 hp
- Speed: 30 knots (55.56 km/h)
- Armament: 1 × 10.5 cm main gun (since 1941); 1 × Bofors 40 mm L/60 gun; 2 × 2 cm AA guns (four since 1941); 2 × double 53.3 cm torpedo tubes; 24 mines
- Notes: German service characteristics data retrieved from

HNoMS Tor was a Sleipner-class destroyer of the Royal Norwegian Navy that was launched in September 1939. She was under outfitting and testing when Nazi Germany invaded Norway on 9 April 1940. Although scuttled by Norwegian naval personnel to prevent her from being captured by the invading forces, she was soon salvaged by the Germans and put into service with the Kriegsmarine. Under the name Tiger she served out the war as an escort and training vessel, being recovered by the Norwegians in Denmark after the German capitulation in 1945. After the war she was converted to a frigate and served until 1959.

== Construction ==
As part of the Norwegian rearmament scheme in the last years leading up to the Second World War, the Royal Norwegian Navy began building a series of new destroyers. The six ships of the Sleipner class were larger than the preceding First World War vintage Draug-class vessels. At some 735 tons the Sleipner-class ships were still much smaller than the destroyers of the major navies of the time. The Royal Norwegian Navy had requested 1,000 ton destroyers, but financial constraints led to the 735-ton Sleipner class being constructed as a compromise. The Sleipner-class design focused on anti-surface and anti-aircraft artillery, and modern anti-submarine equipment. The ships did however suffer from insufficient range and seaworthiness.

The construction of Tor was financed through the extraordinary appropriations to the Norwegian Armed Forces following the outbreak of the Second World War. The funds were intended to improve the armed forces' ability to protect Norwegian neutrality against violations by the warring parties. While all five of her sister ships were constructed at the Royal Norwegian Navy's main naval yard at Karljohansvern in Horten, Tor was built at Fredrikstad Mekaniske Verksted in Fredrikstad. Her keel was laid in November 1938. The penultimate ship of the Sleipner class, she was launched on 7 September 1939.

The successful launch of Tor at Fredrikstad Mekaniske Verksted led member of parliament from the Conservative Party, naval captain Trygve Sverdrup, in a closed meeting of the Parliament of Norway on 11 March 1940, to argue for further Sleipner-class ships to be rapidly constructed at the shipyard in order to improve the numbers of the Royal Norwegian Navy.

== Second World War ==
=== German invasion and scuttling ===
By the time of the 9 April 1940 German invasion of Norway, Tor had received her crew and begun her trials and shakedown cruises. She had however not yet had any of her armament installed, and was still in the process of fitting out. When it was reported on 9 April that German forces were approaching Fredrikstad, the commander, Captain Ewald Røren, ordered that she was to be scuttled at the shipyard, rather than to be abandoned intact to the advancing Germans. (Note: Despite the reports, Fredrikstad was not seized by the Germans for several days following 9 April invasion. The town and surrounding areas were bombed by 15 Heinkel He 111 bombers on 11 April.) (Note: Ewald Røren had previously commanded the earlier Sleipner-class destroyer Sleipner. Captain Røren was deported to Germany as a prisoner of war in 1942. Inspired by the Oxford Movement, he acted as a lay preacher for the Norwegian prisoners of war while imprisoned.) The crew of Tor made their way inland, joining the Norwegian 1st Division in Østfold and eventually following it into internment in neutral Sweden. The 1st Division's retreat across the border occurred on 14 April 1940, after confused fighting beginning on 12 April.

=== German service ===
==== Salvage ====
After their capture of Fredrikstad, the Germans immediately began work on salvaging the scuttled Norwegian warship. On 16 April, a week after her scuttling, Tor was raised from the harbour. Six days later, on 22 April, the Germans moved her to Drammen for repairs and fitting out. The work on Tor, and her sister ship Balder, was completed during the summer of 1940 at Karljohansvern naval yard in Horten. The completion of the two destroyers was the first work carried out by the state-owned Norwegian naval yard for the German occupants during the Second World War. Tor had yard number 128 at Karljohansvern.

==== As Tiger ====
On 13 June 1940 the Germans commissioned Tor into the Kriegsmarine, renaming her Tiger, and re-designating her as a torpedo boat. (Note: The Kriegsmarine had previously operated a Raubtier-class torpedo boat named Tiger, but this vessel had been lost in a collision with the destroyer Max Schultz on 25 August 1939, shortly before the outbreak of the Second World War.)

In German service Tiger was made part of the 7th Torpedo Boat Flotilla; initially carrying out escort duties in the Skagerrak and Kattegat. The fellow captured Norwegian Sleipner-class destroyers Gyller (Löwe), Odin (Panther) and Balder (Leopard) also formed part of the same flotilla. The first German commander of Tor was Kapitänleutnant Herbert Juttner, who commanded her until relieved in June 1941 by Oberleutnant zur See Friedrich Nose.

From July to December 1940 Tiger functioned as a training ship with the 7th Torpedo Boat Flotilla. When that unit was disbanded she was transferred to the 27th U-boat Flotilla in Gotenhafen as a torpedo recovery vessel. Tiger spent the rest of the war with the 27th U-boat Flotilla, being recovered in Korsør, Denmark in May 1945 and returned to the Royal Norwegian Navy.

== Post-war service ==
After she rejoined the Royal Norwegian Navy Tor was given her old name back, and on 19 September 1946 was allocated the pennant number L.04. In the force lists provided to the Norwegian Parliament in 1946, Tor, her three sister ships, two Hunt-class ships and a vessel still under construction at Karljohansvern were listed as escort destroyers. In 1948 Tor and the four other Sleipner-class vessels that had survived the war, were rebuilt as frigates. During the 1950s Tor was issued with the NATO pennant number F.303. In 1959 Tor and her surviving sister ships were all written off and sold for scrapping.

== Bibliography ==
- Abelsen, Frank (1986). Norwegian Naval Ships 1939–1945 (in Norwegian and English). Oslo: Sem & Stenersen AS. ISBN 82-7046-050-8.
- Birkeli, Fridtjov (1978). Mellom himmel og jord (in Norwegian). Oslo: Luther. ISBN 8253172222.
- Caspersen, Alf Johs. (1995). Milorg Horten 1940–1945: bilder fra Borre og Nykirke (in Norwegian). Horten: A.J. Caspersen.
- Hafsten, Bjørn; Ulf Larsstuvold; Bjørn Olsen; Sten Stenersen (2005). Flyalarm – luftkrigen over Norge 1939–1945 (in Norwegian) (2nd, revised ed.). Oslo: Sem og Stenersen AS. ISBN 82-7046-074-5.
- Hauge, Andreas (1995). Kampene i Norge 1940 (in Norwegian). Vol. 1. Sandefjord: Krigshistorisk Forlag. ISBN 82-993369-0-2.
- Johannesen, Folke Hauger (1988). Gå på eller gå under (in Norwegian). Oslo: Faktum Forlag AS. ISBN 82-540-0113-8.
- Langemyr, Leif-Tore; Frank Abelsen; Dagfinn E. Kjeholt; Anders Petterøe (1992). Jageren H.Nor.M.S. "Glaisdale" og dens besetning (in Norwegian). Kolbjørnsvik: Leif-Tore Langemyr forl. ISBN 82-991313-3-2.
- Løvlie, Arne (2004). Norske våpen i tyske hender – De militære bedrifter under okkupasjonen 1940–1945 (in Norwegian). Oslo: Norwegian Armed Forces Museum. ISBN 82-91218-41-2.
- Mo, Sverre (2008). Norske marinefartøy – Samtlige norske marinefartøy 1814–2008 og Marinens Flygevåpen 1912–1944 (in Norwegian). Bergen: Bodoni Forlag. ISBN 978-82-7128-497-8.
- Norway, Parliament of (1995). Møter for lukkede dører, Stortinget 1939–1945 : dokumenter og referater, 9. overordentlige storting 1939-40, 89. ordentlige storting 1940, fortsatte 89. ordentlige storting 1945 (in Norwegian). Oslo: Parliament of Norway. ISBN 82-91283-09-5.
- Showell, Jak Mallmann (1999). The German Navy Handbook 1939–1945. Sutton Publishing. ISBN 978-0-7509-1556-4.
- Sivertsen, Svein Carl, ed. (2001). Sjøforsvaret dag for dag 1814–2000 (in Norwegian). Hundvåg: Sjømilitære Samfund ved Norsk Tidsskrift for Sjøvesen. ISBN 82-92217-03-7.
- Tjøstheim, Inge (1993). Sjøforsvarets hovedoppgaver: Illusjon eller virkelighet? (in Norwegian). Oslo: Norwegian Institute for Defence Studies.
- Vagnsnes, Ella Marie Brekke (1995). Verda inn over dørstokken : krigsminne frå Fusa (in Norwegian). Eikelandsosen: Fusa Municipality. ISBN 8291386102.
