= HNoMS Tjeld =

Two ships of the Royal Norwegian Navy have borne the name HNoMS Tjeld or Kjell (archaic spelling), after the Eurasian oystercatcher:

- HNoMS Kjell was a 2.-class torpedo boat launched in 1912, captured by the Germans in 1940 and sunk by British aircraft in 1944.
- HNoMS Tjeld (1978) was a Tjeld-class patrol boat launched in 1978 and sold for scrapping in 1992.
