= HNoMS Gyller =

Two ships of the Royal Norwegian Navy have borne the name HNoMS Gyller, after Gyller – one of the twelve horses of the Æsir:

- HNoMS Gyller (1847) was a steam-powered schooner launched in 1847.
- HNoMS Gyller (1938) a Sleipner-class destroyer launched in 1938 and captured by the Germans in 1940. Returned to Norway in 1945 and rebuilt as frigate in 1948.
