= German submarine UC-1 =

Two submarines of Germany have borne the name UC-1:

- SM UC-1, a Type UC I submarine launched in 1915 and lost in 1917
- UC-1, formerly the B-class submarine HNoMS B-5 captured from Norway in 1940

== See also ==
- German Type UC I submarine
