= UC1 =

UC1 may refer to:

- German submarine UC-1
  - SM UC-1, a German World War I submarine
- German Type UC I submarine of World War II
- UC1 Freya, a Danish private electric sub

== See also ==
- UC (disambiguation)
