= Nordvik =

Nordvik may refer to:

== People ==
- Andreas Nordvik (born 1987), a Norwegian footballer
- Hans Nordvik (1880–1960), a Norwegian sport rifle shooter
- Jørgen Nordvik (1895–1977), a Norwegian jurist

== Places ==
=== Norway ===
- Nordvik Municipality, a former municipality in Nordland county
- Nordvik, Vestland, a village in Bergen Municipality and Bjørnafjorden Municipality in Vestland county

=== Russia ===
- Nordvik, Russia, a former town in Krasnoyarsk Krai (abandoned in 1956)
- Nordvik Bay, a gulf in the Laptev Sea

== See also ==
- Norvik
