= HNoMS Kjell =

Norwegian navy torpedo boat

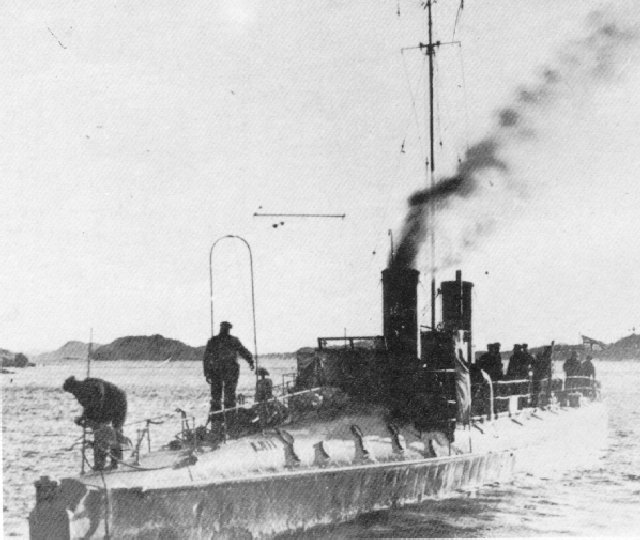
- Kjell off the coast of Norway.

History

Norway
- Name: Kjell
- Builder: The Royal Norwegian Navy Shipyard in Horten
- Yard number: 106
- Launched: 12 March 1912
- Commissioned: 1912
- Captured: by the Germans on 11 April 1940

Germany
- Name: KT1
- Namesake: Dragoon
- Acquired: 11 April 1940
- Renamed: NK.02 Dragoner after rebuild to minesweeper
- Fate: Sunk by RAF de Havilland Mosquitos near off Ryvingen near Mandal, Norway 28 September 1944

General characteristics as built
- Class & type: 2.-class torpedo boat
- Displacement: 84 tons
- Length: 41.1 m (134 ft 10 in)
- Beam: 4.7 m (15 ft 5 in)
- Draft: 2.4 m (7 ft 10 in)
- Propulsion: 1,800 hp (1,300 kW) triple expansion steam engine
- Speed: 25 knots (46 km/h; 29 mph)
- Complement: 21
- Armament: 1 × 76 mm (3 in) gun; 1 × machine gun; 1 × fixed torpedo tube in the bow; 2 × trainable torpedo launchers
- Notes: All the above listed information, unless otherwise noted, was acquired from

General characteristics in German service
- Class & type: 2.-class torpedo boat
- Displacement: 84 tons
- Length: 41.1 m (134 ft 10 in)
- Beam: 4.7 m (15 ft 5 in)
- Draft: 2.4 m (7 ft 10 in)
- Propulsion: 1,800 hp (1,300 kW) triple expansion steam engine
- Speed: 25 knots (46 km/h; 29 mph)
- Complement: 21
- Armament: 1 × 76 mm (3 in) gun; 1 × 37 mm (1.5 in) gun; 1 × machine gun; 2 × torpedo tubes
- Notes: All the above listed information, unless otherwise noted, was acquired from

HNoMS Kjell was the final ship of twenty-seven 2nd class torpedo boats built for the Royal Norwegian Navy, launched at the Royal Norwegian Navy's shipyard in Horten on 12 March 1912 with build number 106. Kjell saw more than 32 years of service, the first 28 years in the Royal Norwegian Navy during the First World War and in the interwar period, the last four in the Kriegsmarine, having been captured in the first days of the 1940 Norwegian campaign. After being rebuilt as a minesweeper by the Germans, she was sunk by Royal Air Force de Havilland Mosquito fighter bombers on 28 September 1944. Divers rediscovered the shipwreck in 2006.

== Characteristics ==
Kjell was the last of 27 small, cigar-shaped, pre-First World War torpedo boats built for the Royal Norwegian Navy. The other ships in her post-1905 series were the 1906 Teist (black guillemot) and the 1907 Skarv (cormorant). The series' main armament consisted of two deck-mounted torpedo launchers and one fixed torpedo tube in the bow. While Teist and Skarv were both armed with two 47 mm (1.9 in) guns, Kjell was equipped with a single 76 mm (3 in) main gun. Unlike all the preceding Norwegian torpedo boats the Officers' Mess on board Kjell was located in the bow section, with easy access to the command position in the tower.

== First World War ==
The Royal Norwegian Navy mobilized on 2 August 1914, shortly after the outbreak of the First World War. With Norway having declared herself a neutral country the torpedo boats were ordered to carry the lion's share of the neutrality protection patrols. This was despite their less than satisfactory seaworthiness in open seas, having been designed for service close to shore and in the many Norwegian fjords. The background for the decision to deploy the torpedo boats as the main Norwegian patrol force was based on the small ships being more economic to operate than the navy's larger vessels in a time of uncertain coal and oil supplies. In one episode during her First World War service Kjell intercepted the British submarine E30 on 2 July 1916. The submarine had hailed and fired two shots at the 578-ton Norwegian steamer SS Prunelle of Bergen, off Lindesnes in southern Norway. The British submarine managed to dive and make good its escape, but although E30's crew claimed that Prunelle was 5.6 kilometres (3.5 mi) from shore and hence outside Norwegian territorial waters, the Norwegians claimed that the steamer was only 2.4 kilometres (1.5 mi) from shore and therefore inside Norwegian waters. The Norwegians therefore protested that the attack had violated Norwegian territorial waters and that E30 had dived away and not remained on the surface. The neutrality violation had been so well documented that the UK government later issued an apology to its Norwegian counterpart, and revised its instruction to submarines operating close to neutral coastlines.

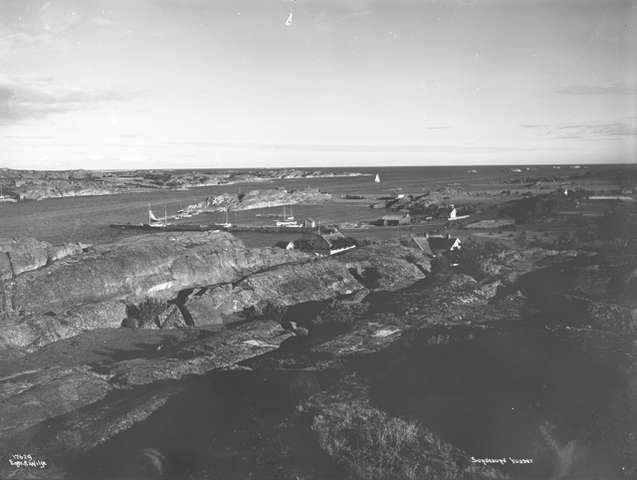
The islet-rich Færder area in 1915

== Inter-war period ==
By the end of the First World War the Norwegian torpedo boat fleet had been worn down by constant service and 14 of the vessels were decommissioned and disposed of in 1920. Twenty-three torpedo boats, including Kjell, were obliged to continue in service due to budgetary restrictions despite being long outdated and ready for replacement. Although officially still in service the torpedo boats spent most of the inter-war period in port, only being equipped for exercises some two to three months every year.

=== Intercepting smugglers ===
For Kjell the 1922 exercise season turned out somewhat unusual as she was deployed against alcohol smugglers on the coast as part of the enforcement of the 1916–1927 Norwegian prohibition. During 20 days in September 1922 Kjell operated off Færder Lighthouse in Tjøme Municipality, soon earning the nickname Terror of the smugglers (Norw. Smugglernes skrekk) by confiscating on average 1,500 litres (329.95 imp gal) of spirits a day. At the conclusion of the 20-day anti-smuggling cruise each member of the torpedo boat's crew received the then-substantial amount of 382 Norwegian kroner in prize money.

== Second World War ==
=== Norwegian service ===
==== Neutrality protection ====
At the outbreak of the Second World War the Norwegian torpedo boat force was again deployed guarding the coastline against neutrality violations. Kjell was at that time part of the 2. Torpedo boat Division in the Kristiansand section of the 1st Naval District, covering the southernmost part of the Norwegian coastline. As had been the case during the First World War the torpedo boats were once more spread singly along the coastline.

===== Rescuing a Norwegian aircrew =====
One incident in which Kjell was involved was when she on 14 October 1939 rescued from the skerry Østre Flandern near Flekkerøy the three-man crew of Marinens Flyvebaatfabrikk M.F.11 F.320, which had made an emergency landing after suffering engine failure. Kjell recovered the Royal Norwegian Navy Air Service crew in the early afternoon of 14 October, while the wreck of F.320 was retrieved by the patrol boat Lyngdal the next day.

===== Altmark Incident =====
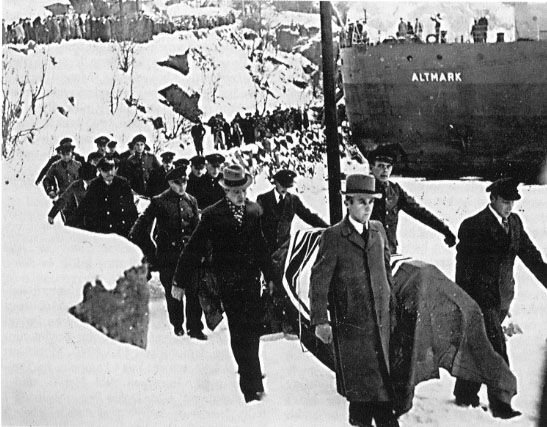
German dead being brought ashore for burial after the Altmark Incident

One of the tasks given to the Norwegian torpedo boat force as part of their renewed neutrality protection duties was the escort and inspection of vessels belonging to the warring parties. One of these missions included the control and escort of the German auxiliary tanker Altmark in February 1940. Altmark was returning to Germany after having supported the German pocket battleship Admiral Graf Spee in the South Atlantic. On her return voyage to Germany she was carrying 299 British merchant sailors as prisoners of war (POWs), and entered Norwegian waters north of Trondheimsfjord on 14 February 1940. The transport of POWs through neutral territorial waters was not in violation of public international law, and as Norwegian authorities feared an incident between the German ship and the Royal Navy the ship was allowed passage through the restricted areas at Bergen. The passage at Bergen was in violation of official Norwegian neutrality regulations as the tanker was a state-operated vessel of a warring party. As Altmark proceeded southwards to Germany she was escorted along the way by various Norwegian warships. On the day after she entered Norwegian waters, 15 February, the Altmark was spotted by British reconnaissance aircraft and soon after confronted by a force of six Royal Navy destroyers. In an effort to avoid capture Altmark sought shelter in the Jøssingfjorden, in the area between Egersund and Flekkefjord, now under the escort of Kjell and fellow torpedo boat Skarv. Ignoring protests from the Norwegian naval vessels, which commanders were under direct orders not to fire at the British, the destroyer HMS Cossack entered Jøssingfjord at 2220hrs on 16 February and boarded the German ship, killing six, mortally wounding one of the German crew and freeing the British prisoners. The failure of Kjell and the other Norwegian warships to intervene in the blatant neutrality violation led Hitler to speed up plans for a German invasion of Norway, six days after the incident appointing General Nikolaus von Falkenhorst as commander of the operation. One of the immediate German reactions to the incident was a demand that the commanders of Kjell and Skarv be dismissed, although this was quickly dropped following the recommendation of the German legation in Oslo. The Norwegian government on its part issued strong protests to the UK government, President of the Norwegian Parliament C. J. Hambro stating that the united Norwegian parliament and people protested the British intrusion at Jøssingfjord.

===== U-21 =====
Another incident occurred the following month when, on 27 March 1940, the German submarine U-21 accidentally ran aground at Oddene near Ryvingen south-east of Mandal. Marinens Flyvebaatfabrikk M.F.11 F.328 landed near the U-boat and guarded it until Norwegian naval vessels reached the scene and interned the crew. U-21 was towed to Kristiansand the next day under escort of Kjell, Teist, the destroyer Odin and the B-class submarine B-2.

==== German invasion ====
On 8 April 1940, the day before the German invasion, Kjell was in Kristiansand carrying out repairs which were finished by afternoon. The next morning she was ordered to nearby Marvika naval base to take on board torpedoes. However, before the vessel could be made war ready orders came through from the commander of the local naval section that resistance to the German invasion in the Kristiansand area was to cease. As the Germans occupied Marvika Kjell was allowed to move to nearby Vigebukta bay in the Topdalsfjord. On 11 April the torpedo boat was seized by German infantry and at 1830hrs the German war flag was raised, signalling the ship's transfer to Kriegsmarine service.

=== German service ===
Initially renamed KT1 and used as a Vorpostenboot (outpost boat), she was then rebuilt as a minesweeper under the name NK.02 Dragoner. Serving as a patrol boat and escort vessel on the coast of occupied Norway, Dragoner was sailing alone off Ryvingen near Mandal when she was discovered and attacked by six No. 248 Squadron RAF de Havilland Mosquito fighter bombers on 28 September 1944. After a brief and futile fight she was sunk by a combination of autocannon fire and a depth charge exploding underneath her midship section. Of the 25 Germans on board at the time of the sinking 18 survived, seven of whom were wounded. The attacking RAF aircraft suffered no damage from the German return-fire and all returned to base.

== Discovery of the wreck ==
The wreck of Dragoner was discovered partly intact at some 40 metres (130 ft) depth several kilometres from land by a team of three Norwegian divers in February 2006. The wreck has since been declared a war grave.

== Literature ==
- Abelsen, Frank (1986). Norwegian naval ships 1939–1945 (in Norwegian and English). Oslo: Sem & Stenersen AS. ISBN 82-7046-050-8.
- Hafsten, Bjørn; Ulf Larsstuvold; Bjørn Olsen; Sten Stenersen (1991). Flyalarm – luftkrigen over Norge 1939–1945 (in Norwegian) (1st ed.). Oslo: Sem og Stenersen AS. ISBN 82-7046-058-3.
- Hafsten, Bjørn; Tom Arheim (2003). Marinens Flygevåpen 1912–1944 (in Norwegian). Oslo: TankeStreken AS. ISBN 82-993535-1-3.
- Monograph No. 33: Home Waters – Part VII: From June 1916 to November 1916 (PDF). Naval Staff Monographs (Historical). Vol. XVII. The Naval Staff, Training and Staff Duties Division. 1927.
- Hegland, Jon Rustung; Johan Henrik Lilleheim (1998). Norske torpedobåter gjennom 125 år (in Norwegian). Hundvåg: Sjømilitære Samfund ved Norsk Tidsskrift for Sjøvesen. ISBN 82-994738-1-0.
- Thomassen, Marius (1995). 90 år under rent norsk orlogsflagg (in Norwegian). Bergen: Eide Forlag. ISBN 82-514-0483-5.
