= HNoMS Lyn (1882) =

Norwegian ship

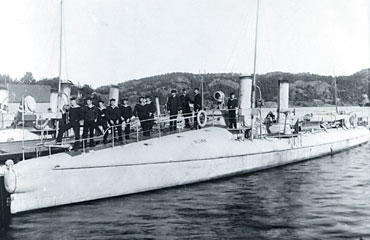
- Lyn class torpedo boat Blink

History

Norway
- Name: Lyn
- Ordered: 1882
- Launched: 1882
- Commissioned: 1882
- Fate: Scrapped, 1920

General characteristics
- Class & type: 2.-class torpedo boat
- Displacement: 42 long tons (43 t)
- Complement: 11
- Armament: 1 × 37 mm (1.5 in) gun; 1 × fixed torpedo tube

HNoMS Lyn - or just Lyn in Norwegian - was the lead ship of a class of 27 torpedo boats built between 1892 and 1912. The name means Lightning. By modern standards, she was extremely lightly armed with just one 'quick fire' 37 mm cannon and a single, fixed torpedo tube, but in her time she did pack a punch. Later boats of her class carried heavier armament. Lyn was later renamed Od, before she and most of her class were scrapped in 1920, long after they were obsolete.

Small, nimble and fast craft for their time, the class provided much of the backbone for the Royal Norwegian Navy in the time leading up to Norwegian independence in 1905, and also during World War I. The class was often referred to as cigars due to their shape as seen on the photos. These qualities made them excellent torpedo boats - small size and low freeboard - but also made them very uncomfortable boats to crew, with cramped quarters and not very seaworthy.

Over the 30 years the class was built, the size increased steadily, as well as the armament. The last boats in the class had a displacement almost twice that of Lyn, and two fixed torpedo tubes instead of just one. The class was in the later years of their service referred to as "2nd class" torpedo boats, to differentiate them from the larger "1st class" torpedo boats, which had one or two moveable torpedo launchers on deck.

== Gallery ==
Six of the Lyn class torpedo boats in attack formation during World War I.

Models of late production Lyn class torpedoboats, seen from starboard.

Models of late production Lyn class torpedoboats, seen from the stern.

== Citations ==
=== Bibliography ===
- Campbell, N. J. M. (1979). "Norway". In Gardiner, Robert (ed.). Conway's All the World's Fighting Ships 1860–1905. London: Conway Maritime Press. pp. 369–371. ISBN 978-0-85177-133-5.
- Westerlund, Karl-Erik (1985). "Norway". In Gardiner, Robert; Gray, Randal (eds.). Conway's All the World's Fighting Ships 1906–1921. London: Conway Maritime Press. pp. 348–350. ISBN 978-0-85177-245-5.
