= Norvik =

Norvik is a surname. Notable people with this surname include:

- Erling Johannes Norvik (1899-1964), Norwegian politician
- Erling Norvik (1928-1998), Norwegian politician
- Harald Norvik (born 1946), Norwegian businessman

== See also ==
- Norvik Banka, previous name of PNB Banka, Latvian bank
- Norvik press, founded by James McFarlane
- Nordvik (disambiguation)
