= 2.-class torpedo boat =

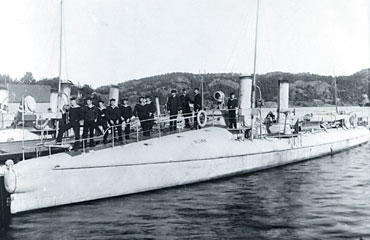
- Norweign torpedo boat Lyn, a 2.-class torpedo boat

Class overview
- Operators: Royal Danish Navy; Swedish Navy; Royal Norwegian Navy
- Built: 1892–1894
- In commission: 1880s–1940s
- Planned: 41
- Completed: 41
- Scrapped: 41

General characteristics
- Type: Torpedo boat
- Displacement: 42 long tons (43 t)
- Complement: 11
- Armament: 1 × 37 mm (1.5 in) gun 1 × fixed torpedo tube

The 2.-class torpedo boat was a designation in the Scandinavian countries for a type of fast steam torpedo boats between 40 tons and 80 tons, in service from the 1880s to after World War I.

== Ships in class ==
=== Royal Danish Navy ===
- 1882 Torpedobaad Nr. 2
- 1882 Torpedobaad Nr. 3
- 1882 Torpedobaad Nr. 4
- 1882 Torpedobaad Nr. 5
- 1884 Torpedobaad Nr. 6
- 1884 Torpedobaad Nr. 7
- 1886 Torpedobaad Nr. 8
- 1886 Torpedobaad Nr. 9
- 1888 Torpedobaad Nr. 10
- 1888 Torpedobaad Nr. 11
- 1889 Torpedobaad Nr. 12
- 1894 Torpedobaad Hajen
- 1894 Torpedobaad Søulven

=== Royal Norwegian Navy ===
- HNoMS Lyn (1882)
- HNoMS Glimt
- HNoMS Blink
- HNoMS Pil
- HNoMS Snar
- HNoMS Orm
- HNoMS Oter
- HNoMS Varg
- HNoMS Raket
- HNoMS Djerv
- HNoMS Kvik
- HNoMS Hvas
- HNoMS Kjaek
- HNoMS Hauk
- HNoMS Falk
- HNoMS Orn
- HNoMS Ravn
- HNoMS Grib
- HNoMS Jo
- HNoMS Skarv
- HNoMS Teist
- HNoMS Kjell (1912)

=== Royal Swedish Navy ===
- HSwMS Hugin (1884)
