= Norwegian B-class submarine =

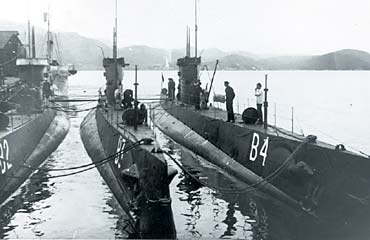
- The B-class submarines B-2, B-3 and B-4 at quay in Norway

Class overview
- Builders: Karljohansvern Naval shipyard
- Operators: Royal Norwegian Navy
- Preceded by: A class
- Succeeded by: U class
- In service: 1923 – 1946
- In commission: 1 February 1923
- Completed: 6
- Lost: 1
- Retired: 5

General characteristics
- Type: Submarine
- Displacement: 365 tons surfaced; 545 tons submerged
- Length: 51 m (167 ft)
- Beam: 5.3 m (17 ft)
- Draught: 3.5 m (11 ft)
- Propulsion: 2 × Sulzer 900 shp (670 kW) diesel engines; 2 × 700 shp (520 kW) electric engines
- Speed: 15 knots (28 km/h) surfaced; 8.9 knots (16.5 km/h) dived
- Range: 2,900 nmi (5,400 km) at 9 kn (17 km/h) surfaced; 150 nmi (280 km) at 3 kn (5.6 km/h) submerged
- Complement: 23
- Armament: 4 × 45 cm (18 in) torpedo tubes; 1 × 76 mm (3.0 in) gun

The B-class submarines were a class of six vessels of the US L class built on licence at Karljohansvern naval shipyard in Horten, Norway from 1922 to 1929 and deployed by the Royal Norwegian Navy.

== Boats ==
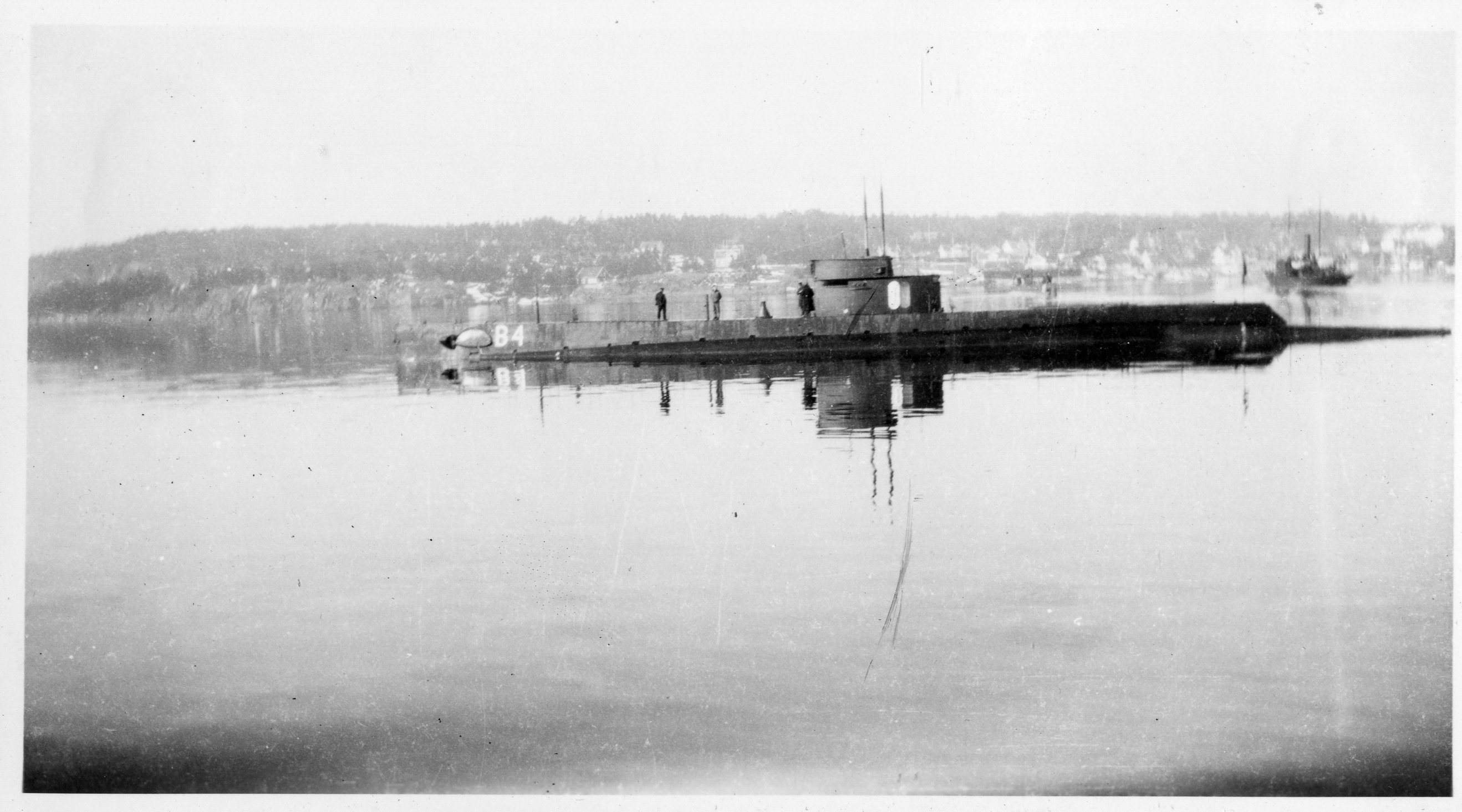
B-4 near Tønsberg

- B-1 (1922–1946) Escaped to the United Kingdom 8 June 1940.
- B-2 (1923–1940) Captured by the Germans at Fiskå on 11 April.
- B-3 (1923–1940) Scuttled in Alsvåg, Vesterålen 10 June 1940 by its own crew to prevent capture by the Germans. Ordered to escape to the UK, but prevented by battery explosion.
- B-4 (1923–1940) Captured by the Germans at Filtvet on 10 April.
- B-5 (1929–1940) Captured by the Germans at Fiskå on 11 April.
- B-6 (1929–1940) Surrendered to German troops on 18 May under threat of bombing of the port of Florø.

== See also ==
- List of ship classes of the Second World War

== Bibliography ==
- Abelsen, Frank (1986). Norwegian naval ships 1939–1945 (in Norwegian and English). Oslo: Sem & Stenersen AS. ISBN 82-7046-050-8.
