= HNoMS Sleipner (1936) =

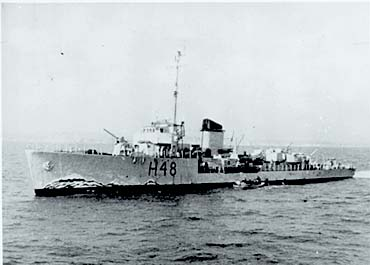
- Sleipner at sea sometime after the Second World War. Note the painted on false bow wave.

History

Norway
- Name: Sleipner
- Namesake: Sleipnir – the eight-legged steed of Odin
- Builder: The Royal Norwegian Navy's shipyard at Horten
- Yard number: 120
- Laid down: 3 October 1934
- Launched: 7 May 1936
- Commissioned: 1936
- Decommissioned: 1956
- Fate: Sold for scrapping in 1956

General characteristics
- Class & type: Sleipner-class destroyer
- Displacement: 735 tons
- Length: 74.30 m (243.77 ft)
- Beam: 7.75 m (25.43 ft)
- Draft: 4.15 m (13.62 ft)
- Propulsion: Two De Laval geared turbines with two shafts and 12,500 hp
- Speed: 32 knots (59.26 km/h)
- Range: 3,500 nautical miles (6,482.00 km) at 15 knots (27.78 km/h)
- Complement: Peacetime: 72 men; War crew: 83 men
- Armament: As built: 3 × 10 cm guns; 1 × 40 mm Bofors L/60; anti-aircraft gun; 2 × 12.7 mm Colt; anti-aircraft machine guns; 2 × 53.3 cm trainable torpedo tubes; 4 × depth charge throwers; After 1942 rebuild: 2 × 4 in. guns; 1 × 40 mm Bofors L/60; anti-aircraft gun; 2 × 20 mm Oerlikon; anti-aircraft gun; 1 × 12.7 mm Colt; anti-aircraft machine guns; 2 × 53.3 cm trainable torpedo tubes; 4 × depth charge throwers

Service record
- Commanders: Captain E. Ullring (8 April 1940 – 28 June 1940); Captain T. Horve (28 June 1940 – December 1941); Captain Rolf Hag (December 1941 – 22 July 1942); Lieutenant Kleppe (22 July 1942 – 10 March 1944)
- Operations: Norwegian campaign; Battle of Britain
- Victories: 2 ships (1,500 tons) captured; 2 bombers downed

HNoMS Sleipner was a destroyer commissioned into the Royal Norwegian Navy in 1936. The lead ship of the Sleipner class, she gained near-legendary status in Norway by enduring over two weeks of intense air attack by Luftwaffe bombers following the 9 April 1940 invasion of Norway. After the resistance in South Norway started unravelling she made her way over the North Sea to continue the fight against the Germans from exile. After serving as a convoy escort along the coast of the United Kingdom, she was decommissioned in 1944. She was recommissioned in 1948 after being converted to a frigate. Along with her surviving sister ships she was sold for scrapping in 1959.

== Construction ==
Sleipner was built at Karljohansvern naval shipyard in Horten and had yard number 120. Sleipner had three 10 cm guns although she was unable to elevate her main guns high enough to fire at aircraft. Her armament also included two 53.3 cm trainable torpedo tubes, two Colt anti-aircraft machine guns. Finishing her anti-aircraft armament was a 40 mm Bofors L/60.

== Second World War ==
=== City of Flint incident ===
Sleipner became involved in the events surrounding the steamer City of Flint when the captured American ship's German prize crew brought her to the North Norwegian port city of Tromsø on 30 October 1939, seeking shelter from British naval forces. The Norwegian destroyer escorted the ship away from the port after its German prize crew were refused entry into the port. After City of Flint entered the port of Haugesund further south on 3 November the ship was seized by the Norwegian minelayer Olav Tryggvason, the German prize crew interned and the American crew freed.

=== British mining and German invasion ===
When Sleipner's commander got a word of the German attack on Norway, the destroyer was part of the 2nd Naval District's 2nd destroyer division, covering an area roughly the same as the Vestlandet and Trøndelag regions. On 8 April 1940 she patrolled Hustadvika Bay together with the patrol boat Syrian, watching over a fictitious minefield laid there by the British destroyers Hero and Hyperion (Operation Wilfred). She was immediately ordered to join the torpedo boats Trygg and Sild in order to defend the mouth of the Romsdalsfjord against any German attempt at intrusion.

=== Establishment of Romsdalsfjord Naval District ===
On 11 April Captain Ernst Ullring of Sleipner was ordered by the commander of the 2nd Naval District, Rear Admiral Carsten Tank-Nielsen, to take command of the improvised Romsdalsfjord Naval District. The district had been established the day before by Lieutenant Münster of Trygg. Captain Ullring had at his disposal to defend the Romsdalsfjord his own ship Sleipner and the torpedo boats Trygg, Sild and Skrei. In addition to the warships he also had at his disposal the unorthodox Romsdalsfjord Air Group consisting of one Norwegian Marinens Flyvebaatfabrikk M.F.11, one captured German Arado Ar 196 and (from 12 and 13 April respectively) two Fleet Air Arm Supermarine Walrus. The aircraft would be used mostly for reconnaissance before being evacuated to the United Kingdom on 18 April due to lack of fuel and ammunition. The hope was that the air crews would be able to return in a short time with better aircraft. Due to the evacuation of the Allied forces in the southern parts of Norway only sixteen days later, on 4 May, this objective did not come to fruition.

== Sleipner in action against the invasion forces ==
=== German ships move down the coast ===
Sleipner's first hostile encounter with the German foe occurred on 12 April. At this date Captain Ullring decided to act on information received on 10 April that two German vessels were making their way down the coast towards the south. The ships were the 1,080-ton merchant Ruhrort of Duisburg and the 420-ton trawler Thüringen. When the war broke out on 9 April the two ships had been at Ålesund, but they had sailed off immediately after news of the German attack spread. As the two ships moved south the local people along their route became anxious that there might be German landing troops hidden on board the vessels and Capt. Ullring felt the need to decisively put an end to the situation. As the German ships had anchored up in the bay Stettevika near Skodje the local municipal police officer, Henrik Daae Quale, was contacted to coordinate his actions with those of the Romsdalsfjord Naval District. Quale had in the days since the invasion organised a militia force of around 100 civilian volunteers armed mostly with Krag–Jørgensen rifles and shotguns, though with a sprinkling of more improvised arms such as clubs, pitchforks and knives. Although to a large degree without military training Quale's men were motivated to do their bit in the defence of their local area.

=== The action at Stettevika ===
==== Capturing the ships ====
The Norwegian plan of action against two German ships was to seize the vessels for use by the Royal Norwegian Navy as guard ships and intern the crews. Sleipner, Trygg and the 179-ton guard boat Commonwealth were to form the naval part of the operation. Before the arrival of the RNoN warships officer Quale was to negotiate with the Germans to attempt to persuade them to surrender peacefully and bring the German officers to a conference with the Norwegian commanders. These negotiations however failed and as the three Norwegian vessels entered the bay the Skodje militia had surrounded the area to prevent any escape over land. As the ships made their appearance, led by Commonwealth, the German crews abandoned their ships and went into the lifeboats. Marines from Sleipner, led by the ship's second in command, Lieutenant Dagfin E. Kjeholt, boarded Ruhrort and searched the ship. The search and later inspections revealed that Ruhrort had had vital parts of her machinery removed and was thus useless for the RNoN without major work being carried out. As there was no time for such measures she was abandoned at Stetteviken, soon becoming the target of Luftwaffe bombers and finally sunk after a number of attacks. Thüringen, on the other hand, had not been sabotaged in such a way, but two armed bombs were discovered on board, one each in the engine and boiler rooms. After the explosive charges had been safely disarmed the trawler was armed with a 12.7 mm anti-aircraft machine gun and put into service as a guard vessel off Molde. However, the ship was not in good technical condition and spent most of her time at quay at Ålesund. When the RNoN high command left southern Norway in early May Thüringen was scuttled.

==== The fate of the German crews ====
The two German crews, totalling 34 officers and men, came ashore in three lifeboats and were met by Quale, one officer and two armed militiamen. The rest of the Skodje militia had taken up positions in the area around the bay and had been given orders to shoot if anyone tried to resist or escape, but the Germans surrendered without putting up a fight. After their capture all 34 Germans were searched and put on a requisitioned bus which drove them to the community hall in Skodje where they were to be kept under guard by the militia for the next eighteen days. The Germans' imprisonment in Norway lasted until 1 May when, on the eve of the Norwegian capitulation in southern Norway, they were transported to Emblemsvågen from where the steam merchant Borgund sailed off with them towards the United Kingdom. Two days later, on 3 May, Borgund arrived in Shetland and handed the German sailors over to the authorities there as PoWs.

=== Sleipner against the Luftwaffe ===
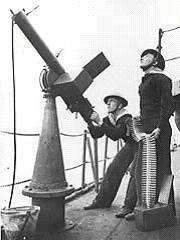
12.7 mm MG52 Colt anti-aircraft machine gun on board Sleipner.

The small Norwegian destroyer cooperated with the torpedo boat HNoMS Trygg in supporting Norwegian and allied forces in the Molde – Åndalsnes area. The ship's first contact with the Allies was when she took on board the British General Bernard Paget from the cruiser Manchester and brought him ashore at Åndalsnes on 24 April.

As her job included defending the Allied landings in southern Norway and the city of Molde Sleipner was a prime target for the Luftwaffe's bombers.

Attacked by bombers in Romsdalsfjord on 20 April, Sleipner shot one German bomber down, which crashed into the sea near the island Sekken, and damaged several others with her Bofors 40 mm anti-aircraft gun. Two days later she shot down another bomber, this one crashing at Norvik. The same day she successfully defended a shipload of requisitioned horses from air attacks. In all 48 bombs were dropped on Sleipner that day, the closest landing 20 metres (66 ft) from the ship.

Between battles Sleipner was anchored up in the Sognefjord and camouflaged with tree branches to avoid detection by the ever-present Luftwaffe.

On 25 April Sleipner was continuously attacked by 12 strafing German bombers and hit numerous times, but without injury to the crew.

By then, however, she had run out of ammunition and had damages that needed repair. At 2325hrs on 25 April she sailed west from the port of Åndalsnes and arrived at Lerwick in Shetland at 1900hrs on 26 April. Her approach had initially led to some alarm amongst the British forces in the area until her identity was discovered. Sleipner departed Lerwick at 0900hrs on 27 April and arrived at Scapa Flow at 1700hrs the same day. The Norwegian destroyer left Scapa Flow for the Tyne at 1330hrs on 30 April. She was going there for a refit, but initially had to be redirected to Rosyth due to German mining operations. Sleipner completed her repairs at the Tyne on 17 June.

=== Propaganda effect – "the unsinkable ship" ===
While Sleipner was fighting in the Romsdalsfjord reports of her exploits, many exaggerated, were transmitted to the Norwegian people from radio stations in areas still under Norwegian government control. These reports were important for the morale of the Norwegian people as one of the few beacons of light amongst the many disasters of that spring (see also: Battle of Vinjesvingen and Battle of Hegra Fortress). Although she probably only shot down two German bombers during her service in the Norwegian campaign contemporary news reports spoke of over a dozen enemy planes brought down by the guns of the small warship.

During her service in Romsdalsfjord Sleipner was claimed by the Germans to have been sunk twice. The Luftwaffe would make one more such claim during her service in exile in the United Kingdom.

In recognition of her war service the Norwegian government-in-exile in London used her likeness when designing the 5 øre issue of the war stamps printed in the United Kingdom.

== Service in the United Kingdom ==
For the rest of her war service Sleipner would escort coastal convoys off the east coast of the United Kingdom, escorting 156 convoys before being decommissioned 10 March 1944 and mothballed for the remainder of the war.

The first escort mission carried out by Sleipner occurred when she departed the Tyne and joined Convoy FN.206. The convoy had sailed from Southend on 27 June, and arrived at its Rosyth destination on 29 June.

On 8 September 1940 German bombers attacked shipping at Methil Roads. Sleipner was present and towed the Dutch merchant ship Stad Vlaardingen after the latter was damaged.

As of 1 July 1941 Sleipner was part of Rosyth Command's escort force, together with British and Dutch warships. By 3 January 1942, when she redeployed to Sheerness for repairs, she was the only non-British warship still serving with the unit.

When she had her main guns exchanged for two new dual-purpose 4 in. pieces in 1942, the old armament of three 10 cm guns were sent to the Norwegian garrison in Svalbard for use as coastal artillery, arriving there 16 October 1942. One of the three guns were installed at Hotellneset near Longyearbyen, one at Kapp Heer near Barentsburg and one in Barentsburg proper. The 10 cm guns were destroyed by German landing troops when they were caught by surprise during the German attack on Svalbard on 8 September 1943.

== Wartime C.O.s ==
- Kommandørkaptein Ernst Ullring: prior to 8 April 1940 – 28 June 1940
- Kommandørkaptein Thore Horve: 28 June 1940 – December 1941
- Kaptein Rolf Hag: December 1941 – 22 July 1942
- Løytnant Kleppe: 22 July 1942 – 10 March 1944

== Post-war ==
In May 1945 Sleipner sailed back to Norway where she continued to be mothballed until her conversion to frigate in 1948.

Sleipner was scrapped in 1956.

== Bibliography ==
- Abelsen, Frank (1986). Norwegian naval ships 1939–1945 (in Norwegian and English). Oslo: Sem & Stenersen AS. ISBN 82-7046-050-8.
- Berg, Ole F. (1997). I skjærgården og på havet – Marinens krig 8. april 1940 – 8. mai 1945 (in Norwegian). Oslo: Marinens krigsveteranforening. ISBN 82-993545-2-8.
- Johannesen, Folke Hauger (1988). Gå på eller gå under (in Norwegian). Oslo: Faktum Forlag AS. ISBN 82-540-0113-8.
- Langemyr, Leif-Tore; Frank Abelsen; Dagfinn E. Kjeholt; Anders Petterøe (1992). Jageren H.Nor.M.S. "Glaisdale" og dens besetning (in Norwegian). Kolbjørnsvik: Leif-Tore Langemyr forl. ISBN 82-991313-3-2.
- Sivertsen, Svein Carl, ed. (1999). Jageren Sleipner i Romsdalsfjord sjøforsvarsdistrikt april 1940 (in Norwegian). Hundvåg: Sjømilitære Samfund ved Norsk Tidsskrift for Sjøvesen.
- Ulvensøen, Jon (1991). Brennpunkt Nord – Værtjenestekrigen 1940–45 (in Norwegian). Oslo: Norwegian Armed Forces Museum. ISBN 82-991167-5-9.
