= Sleipner-class destroyer =

Ship class

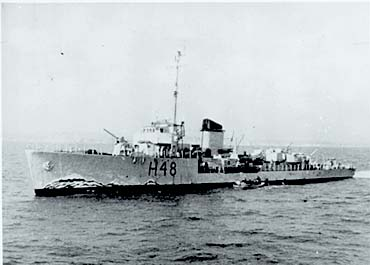
- The lead Sleipner-class destroyer HNoMS Sleipner at sea in 1937

Class overview
- Name: Sleipner class
- Builders: The Royal Norwegian Navy's shipyard at Karljohansvern, Horten; Fredrikstad Mekaniske Verksted (Tor)
- Operators: Royal Norwegian Navy Kriegsmarine
- Preceded by: Draug class
- Succeeded by: Ålesund class (planned); Town class (actual)
- In service: 1936–1959
- Completed: 6
- Lost: 1
- Scrapped: 5

General characteristics
- Type: Destroyer
- Displacement: 735 tons
- Length: 74.30 m (243.77 ft)
- Beam: 7.80 m (25.59 ft)
- Draught: 4.15 m (13.62 ft)
- Propulsion: 12,500 shp (9,300 kW) De Laval oil fuelled steam turbines
- Speed: 32 knots (59.26 km/h)
- Complement: 75
- Armament: 3 × 10 cm guns; 1 × 40 mm Bofors anti-aircraft gun; 2 × 12.7 mm Colt anti-aircraft machine guns; 2 × 53.3 cm torpedo tubes; 4 × depth charge throwers

The Sleipner class was a class of six destroyers (Note: Another source regards these ships as two classes of three; Sleipner, Æger and Gyller (the Sleipner class) and Odin, Balder and Tor (the Odin class).) built for the Royal Norwegian Navy from 1936 until the German invasion in 1940. The design was considered advanced for its time, and it was the first class of vessels for the Norwegian Navy that used aluminium in the construction of the bridge, the mast and the outer funnel. Extra strength special steel was used in the construction of the hull. Unlike the earlier Draug class the Sleipner class had comparatively good capabilities in both main guns, anti-aircraft artillery and anti-submarine weapons. The class was named after Sleipnir, the eight-legged horse of Odin.

== Armament ==
The armament within the class varied slightly. Æger had the armament listed in the article info-box. Sleipner, the lead ship of the class, carried just two 10 cm guns and could not elevate them for use as anti-aircraft weapons. Gyller had two extra torpedo tubes, for a total of four. Odin had a 20 mm anti aircraft gun instead of a 40 mm. Balder and Tor had not been finished when the Germans attacked, and it is not known if any changes in armament were planned.

Although classified by the Norwegians as destroyers they have been widely regarded as torpedo boats because of their displacement and armament.

== Fates ==
The vessels had quite different fates. Æger was bombed by German planes on 9 April 1940, and wrecked with loss of life. Sleipner was in Norwegian service throughout World War II, and was kept in service until 1959. Gyller and Odin were captured by the Germans in 1940 at Kristiansand. Balder and Tor were captured unfinished at the shipyard and put into German service after completion.

Gyller and Odin were returned to the Royal Norwegian Navy after the war and kept in service until 1959. Finished by the Germans, Balder and Tor were used by them until the end of the war in 1945. Balder was scrapped in 1952, Tor in 1959.

The Germans re-classed the ships as Torpedoboot Ausland and renamed them: Gyller to Löwe, Odin to Panther, Balder to Leopard, and Tor to Tiger.

In 1945 Löwe was one of the escorts to the Wilhelm Gustloff on her last voyage. The Wilhelm Gustloff was torpedoed and sank with a great loss of life. During the sinking, Löwe came alongside and rescued 472 of her passengers and crew.

== Ship list ==
Construction data
Name	#	Laid down	Launched	Commissioned	Decommissioned	Notes
Sleipner	120	3 Oct 1934	7 May 1936	1936	1959	
Æger	122		25 Aug 1936	1936	1940	
Gyller	125		7 Jul 1938	1938	1959	renamed Löwe in German service
Odin	126		24 Jan 1939	1939	1959	renamed Panther in German service
Tor			7 Sep 1939	1940	1959	renamed Tiger in German service
Balder			11 Oct 1939	1940	1952	renamed Leopard in German service

== Literature ==
- Abelsen, Frank (1986). Norwegian naval ships 1939-1945 (in Norwegian and English). Oslo: Sem & Stenersen AS. ISBN 82-7046-050-8.
- Sivertsen, Svein Carl, ed. (1999). Jageren Sleipner i Romsdalsfjord sjøforsvarsdistrikt april 1940 (in Norwegian). Hundvåg: Sjømilitære Samfund ved Norsk Tidsskrift for Sjøvesen.
