= HNoMS Gyller (1938) =

Sleipner-class destroyer commissioned in 1938

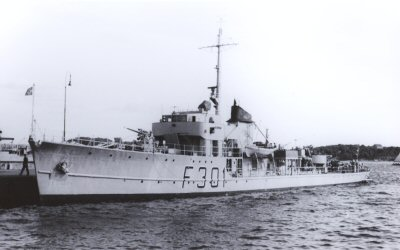
- Gyller as a frigate in 1953.

History

Norway
- Name: Gyller
- Namesake: Gyller – one of the twelve horses of the Æsir
- Builder: The Royal Norwegian Navy's Karljohansvern shipyard at Horten
- Yard number: 125
- Launched: 7 July 1938
- Commissioned: 1938
- Fate: Seized by Germany on 9 April 1940

Service record
- Operations: Opposing the German invasion of Norway

Nazi Germany
- Name: Löwe
- Acquired: 11 April 1940
- Fate: Handed back to Norway after VE Day

Service record
- Operations: Occupation of Norway by Nazi Germany Operation Hannibal

Norway
- Name: Gyller
- Commissioned: May 1945
- Decommissioned: 1959
- Fate: Sold for scrapping 1959

General characteristics as built
- Class & type: Sleipner-class destroyer
- Displacement: 735 tons
- Length: 74.30 m (243.77 ft)
- Beam: 7.75 m (25.43 ft)
- Draft: 4.15 m (13.62 ft)
- Propulsion: Two De Laval geared turbines with two shafts and 12,500 hp (9,300 kW)
- Speed: 32 knots (59.26 km/h)
- Range: 3,500 nautical miles (6,482.00 km) at 15 knots (27.78 km/h)
- Complement: 75 (10 officers and 65 sailors)
- Armament: 3 × 10 cm main guns; 1 × 40 mm Bofors L/60; anti-aircraft gun; 2 × 12.7 mm Colt; anti-aircraft machine guns; 2 × 53.3 cm double barrelled trainable torpedo tubes; 4 × depth charge throwers

General characteristics in German service
- Class & type: Sleipner class
- Displacement: 735 tons
- Length: 74.30 m (243.77 ft)
- Beam: 7.75 m (25.43 ft)
- Draft: 4.15 m (13.62 ft)
- Propulsion: Two De Laval geared turbines with two shafts and 12,500 hp
- Speed: 32 knots (59.26 km/h)
- Range: 3,500 nautical miles (6,482.00 km) at 15 knots (27.78 km/h)
- Complement: 75 (10 officers and 65 sailors)
- Armament: 1 × 10.5 cm main gun (since 1941); 1 × 40 mm Bofors L/60; 2 × 2 cm AA guns (four since 1941); 2 × double 53.3 cm torpedo tubes; 24 mines

HNoMS Gyller was a Sleipner-class destroyer commissioned into the Royal Norwegian Navy in 1938. Along with the other Sleipner-class vessels in commission at that time, she took part in protecting Norwegian neutrality during the Second World War. After initially serving in the far north during the Finno-Soviet Winter War, she was redeployed to Southern Norway, escorting ships through Norwegian territorial waters. When the Germans invaded Norway on 9 April 1940, she was docked at Kristiansand. After taking part in the defence of the port city, she was captured intact by the invading Germans. Renamed Löwe, she sailed with Nazi Germany's Kriegsmarine for the duration of the war.

During her time in German service, she escorted the evacuation ship Wilhelm Gustloff when the latter was torpedoed and sunk by a Soviet submarine with heavy loss of life. Returned to Norway in 1945, she was converted to a frigate in 1948 and sold for scrap in 1959.

== Construction ==
Gyller was built at Karljohansvern naval shipyard and had yard number 125. She was launched on 7 July 1938 Gyller had four torpedo tubes, instead of the two which were standard in the rest of her class.

== Early Norwegian service ==
=== Neutrality protection ===
Gyller spent the early part of the Second World War in the far north of Norway, protecting Norway's neutrality during the Winter War between Finland and the Soviet Union. During her deployment in North Norway she patrolled Norwegian territorial waters and repeatedly had to sink Soviet naval mines that had broken their moorings and drifted into Norwegian waters. During the Winter War all three of the Sleipner-class destroyers commissioned at the time (Æger, Gyller and Sleipner) were deployed to different ports in Finnmark, with Gyller based in Kirkenes.

One occasion when Gyller had to dispose of a mine was on 22 March 1940 when a Royal Norwegian Navy Air Service M.F.11 seaplane operating from an improvised base at Vadsø spotted a mine drifting in the Varangerfjord and directed the destroyer to the scene.

When the Germans invaded Norway she formed part of the 3rd destroyer section in the Kristiansand Defence Sector of the 1st Naval District.

=== Defending Kristiansand ===
When the invasion came Gyller was docked at Kristiansand and got her first warning of the war in the form of gunfire from Odderøya Fort against the attacking German landing force number four. Gyller immediately fired at attacking Luftwaffe bombers with her single Bofors 40 mm gun and two Colt 12.7 mm anti-aircraft machine guns and avoided several bombs dropped against her. After receiving an orientation on the situation from the fort commander Gyller steamed out to the harbour entrance and swung out her torpedo tubes to confront any intruder. However, at 10:00 an order not to fire at British and French forces came to the commander of Kristiansand. This order, combined with confusion of which flags were flown by the intruding warships, led to the German force being able to enter the harbour unopposed on their third attempt at 10:30. At this time Gyller was docked at Tollbodbrygga wharf in Flekkefjord to refill her water tanks for the oncoming battle and was seized without a fight. Gyller was captured together with numerous other naval vessels in the Kristiansand area, including her sister ship Odin. Before entering the Kriegsmarine she was partially rebuilt and rearmed.

== German service as Löwe ==
In Kriegsmarine service she was renamed Löwe (English: Lion), and together with Odin first served as a convoy escort and training ship with the 7. Torpedobootsflottille in Skagerrak and Kattegat in 1940. She then served as a torpedo recovery vessel in Gotenhafen for the rest of the war.

=== Escort for Wilhelm Gustloff ===
Löwe was the single warship accompanying the evacuation ship Wilhelm Gustloff at the time the vessel was torpedoed and sunk by the Soviet submarine S-13 on 30 January 1945. Löwe managed to rescue 472 of the military and civilian passengers, with other German vessels rescuing another c. 758. Over 9,000 people lost their lives in the sinking.

== Post-war Norwegian service ==
After the end of the Second World War Löwe/Gyller was found in Flensburg in Schleswig-Holstein in May 1945 and returned the Royal Norwegian Navy. After three more years in Norway as a destroyer Gyller was converted to a frigate in 1948. Gyller was phased out and sold for scrapping in 1959

== Bibliography ==
- Abelsen, Frank (1986). Norwegian naval ships 1939-1945 (in Norwegian and English). Oslo: Sem & Stenersen AS. ISBN 82-7046-050-8.
- Berg, Ole F. (1997). I skjærgården og på havet - Marinens krig 8. april 1940 - 8. mai 1945 (in Norwegian). Oslo: Marinens krigsveteranforening. ISBN 82-993545-2-8.
- Hafsten, Bjørn; Tom Arheim (2003). Marinens Flygevåpen 1912–1944 (in Norwegian). Oslo: TankeStreken AS. ISBN 82-993535-1-3.
- Johannesen, Folke Hauger (1988). Gå på eller gå under (in Norwegian). Oslo: Faktum Forlag AS. ISBN 82-540-0113-8.
