= HNoMS Odin (1939) =

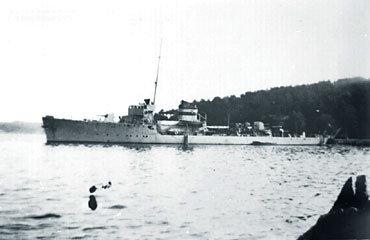
- Odin in 1939.

History

Norway
- Name: Odin
- Namesake: Norse chief god Odin
- Builder: The Royal Norwegian Navy's shipyard at Karljohansvern, Horten Municipality
- Yard number: 126
- Launched: 24 January 1939
- Commissioned: 1939
- Fate: Seized by Germany on 9 April 1940

Service record
- Operations: Opposing the German invasion of Norway

Nazi Germany
- Name: Panther
- Acquired: 11 April 1940
- Fate: Handed back to Norway after VE Day

Service record
- Operations: Occupation of Norway by Nazi Germany

Norway
- Name: Odin
- Commissioned: 1945
- Decommissioned: 1959
- Fate: Sold for scrapping in 1959

General characteristics as built
- Class & type: Sleipner-class destroyer
- Displacement: 735 tons
- Length: 74.30 m (243.77 ft)
- Beam: 7.75 m (25.43 ft)
- Draft: 4.15 m (13.62 ft)
- Propulsion: Two De Laval geared turbines with two shafts and 12,500 hp
- Speed: 32 knots (59.26 km/h)
- Range: 3,500 nautical miles (6,482.00 km) at 15 knots (27.78 km/h)
- Complement: 75 (10 officers and 65 sailors)
- Armament: 3 × 10 cm guns; 1 × 20 mm anti-aircraft gun; 2 × 12.7 mm Colt; anti-aircraft machine gun; 2 × 53.3 cm trainable torpedo tubes; 4 × depth charge throwers

General characteristics after German rebuild
- Class & type: Sleipner class
- Displacement: 735 tons
- Length: 74.30 m (243.77 ft)
- Beam: 7.75 m (25.43 ft)
- Draft: 4.15 m (13.62 ft)
- Propulsion: Two De Laval geared turbines with two shafts and 12,500 hp
- Speed: 32 knots (59.26 km/h)
- Range: 3,500 nautical miles (6,482.00 km) at 15 knots (27.78 km/h)
- Complement: 75 (10 officers and 65 sailors)
- Armament: 1 × 10.5 cm gun; 1 × 3.7 cm anti-aircraft gun; 4 × 2 cm anti aircraft guns, 24 mines

HNoMS Odin was a Sleipner-class destroyer that entered service with the Royal Norwegian Navy in 1939. She and the other Sleipner-class vessels were built as part of a Norwegian rearmament scheme in the last years leading up to the Second World War. In 1940, she had taken part in protecting Norwegian neutrality, before being caught in the German invasion of Norway on 9 April 1940. After fighting the invasion forces at Kristiansand, she was captured and pressed into Kriegsmarine service for the duration of the war. After the end of the war, she was returned to Norway. In 1948, she and her surviving sister ships were converted to frigates and remained in service until sold for scrapping in 1959.

== Construction ==
Odin was built at Karljohansvern naval shipyard in Horten with yard number 126, and was launched on 24 January 1939.

== Second World War ==
After the outbreak of the Second World War, Odin formed part of the 3rd destroyer section in the Kristiansand Defence Sector of the 1st Naval District.

=== Opposing the German invasion of Norway ===
==== Rio de Janeiro ====
On 8 April 1940, she had taken part together with the guard ship Lyngdal in the rescue of the surviving sailors and soldiers from the 5,199 ton clandestine German troop transport Rio de Janeiro sunk by the Polish submarine ORP Orzeł near the small port of Lillesand.

==== Defending Kristiansand ====
The next morning, 9 April 1940, Odin took part in the defence of Kristiansand, against landing group four of the German invasion of Norway. When the battle at Kristiansand between the Kriegsmarine flotilla and Odderøya Fort began Odin steamed out into the Toppdalsfjord and opened up on attacking Luftwaffe bombers with her Oerlikon 20 mm cannon and two 12.7 mm anti-aircraft machine guns. Continuous evasive manoeuvring saved the destroyer from being hit by the many bombs dropped at her and several hits were recorded on the attacking aircraft. One of Heinkel He 111s fell to the sea while returning home with engine malfunction, probably due to the Odin's fire. At about 07:30 a twin-engined aircraft attacked the interned German submarine U-21 that was docked in Kristiansand harbour, having been seized by Norwegian warships for neutrality violations after running aground on the Oddene shallows near Mandal 27 March that year. U-21 had been docked in Kristiansand since 28 March. Odin fired at the aircraft, only to discover it was a RAF Lockheed Hudson reconnaissance aircraft. Neither this time did the Odin's fire bring her target down. At 10:00 an order not to fire at British and French forces came to the commander of Kristiansand. This order, combined with confusion of which flags were flown by the intruding warships, led to the German force being able to enter the harbour unopposed on their third attempt at 10:30. Odin was captured at Marvika naval station together with numerous other naval vessels in the Kristiansand area, including her sister ship Gyller.

=== German service as Panther ===
After the German capture of Kristiansand Odin was handed over to the Kriegsmarine on 11 April and officially entered service as Panther on 20 April. However, before entering the Kriegsmarine she was partially rebuilt and rearmed. During the remainder of the war she operated in Skagerrak and Kattegat as an escort and training ship, in 1940 forming the 7. Torpedobootsflottille together with Gyller, and from January 1942 as a torpedo recovery vessel in Gotenhafen.

In German service she was fitted to carry 24 mines. Since 1941, her armament was changed to one 10.5 cm gun at the stern, one 3.7 cm anti-aircraft gun and four 2 cm anti aircraft guns, without torpedo tubes.

== Post-war RNoN service ==
After the end of the Second World War Panther/Odin was recovered in Holmestrand, Norway, May 1945 and returned to the Royal Norwegian Navy. After three more years in Norway as a destroyer Odin was converted to a frigate in 1948. Odin and her sister ships was phased out and sold for scrapping in 1959

== Bibliography ==
- Abelsen, Frank (1986). Norwegian naval ships 1939–1945 (in Norwegian and English). Oslo: Sem & Stenersen AS. ISBN 82-7046-050-8.
- Berg, Ole F. (1997). I skjærgården og på havet – Marinens krig 8. april 1940 – 8. mai 1945 (in Norwegian). Oslo: Marinens krigsveteranforening. ISBN 82-993545-2-8.
- Johannesen, Folke Hauger (1988). Gå på eller gå under (in Norwegian). Oslo: Faktum Forlag AS. ISBN 82-540-0113-8.
- Sivertsen, Svein Carl, ed. (2001). Sjøforsvaret dag for dag 1814–2000 (in Norwegian). Hundvåg: Sjømilitære Samfund ved Norsk Tidsskrift for Sjøvesen. ISBN 82-92217-03-7.
- Steen, E. A. (1954). Norges Sjøkrig 1940-1945 – Bind I: Sjøforsvarets nøytralitetsvern 1939-1940 : Tysklands og Vestmaktenes planer og forberedelser for en Norgesaksjon (in Norwegian). Oslo: Gyldendal Norsk Forlag.
