= Hans Nobel =

Danish landowner and civil servant

Hans Nobel (1657 – 26 August 1732) was a Danish landowner and civil servant.

== Biography ==
Nobel was born in the village of Kristianopel at Karlskrona in Blekinge where his father was a merchant. He was the son of Hans Mortensen Nobel (dead 1698) and Sophie Casparsdatter Eggers (dead 1693). He was an uncle of jurist and military officer Peter Schnitler (1690–1751). The year after he was born, southern Sweden including Blekinge became Swedish territory under the terms of the Treaty of Roskilde (1658).

Nobel attended school in Kristianstad and was enrolled at the University of Copenhagen in 1677. For a period he was a customs contractor of North Jutland. Nobel served as mining counselor at Nordafjelsk bergamt in Northern Norway from 1702. From 1704 to 1719 he served as Governor of Romsdals Amt (now Møre og Romsdal county). He lived in Molde and was the owner of the Moldegård manor.

From 1713 to 1716, he was a member of the Palace Act Commission (Slottsloven) at Akershus. Between 1717 and 1719, he lived in Brevik. In 1719, Nobel moved to Denmark where he settled as a landowner at Sandholt and Sollerup on Funen. During the 1720s, he oversaw the Norwegian church sale. He lived there until his death in 1732.

His son, Hans Hanssen Nobel (1684–1752), was the Governor of Stavanger Amt. Hans Hansen Nobel was the owner of the property Gammel Strand 36 in Copenhagen. He acquired the property through his marriage to the widow of Icelandic merchant Jørgen Jørgensen Klog.

Government offices
Preceded by Hans Lilienskiold	County Governor of Romsdalens Amt; 1704–1719	Succeeded by Erik Must
