= Flatdal Church =

Church in Telemark, Norway

- Flatdal kyrkje
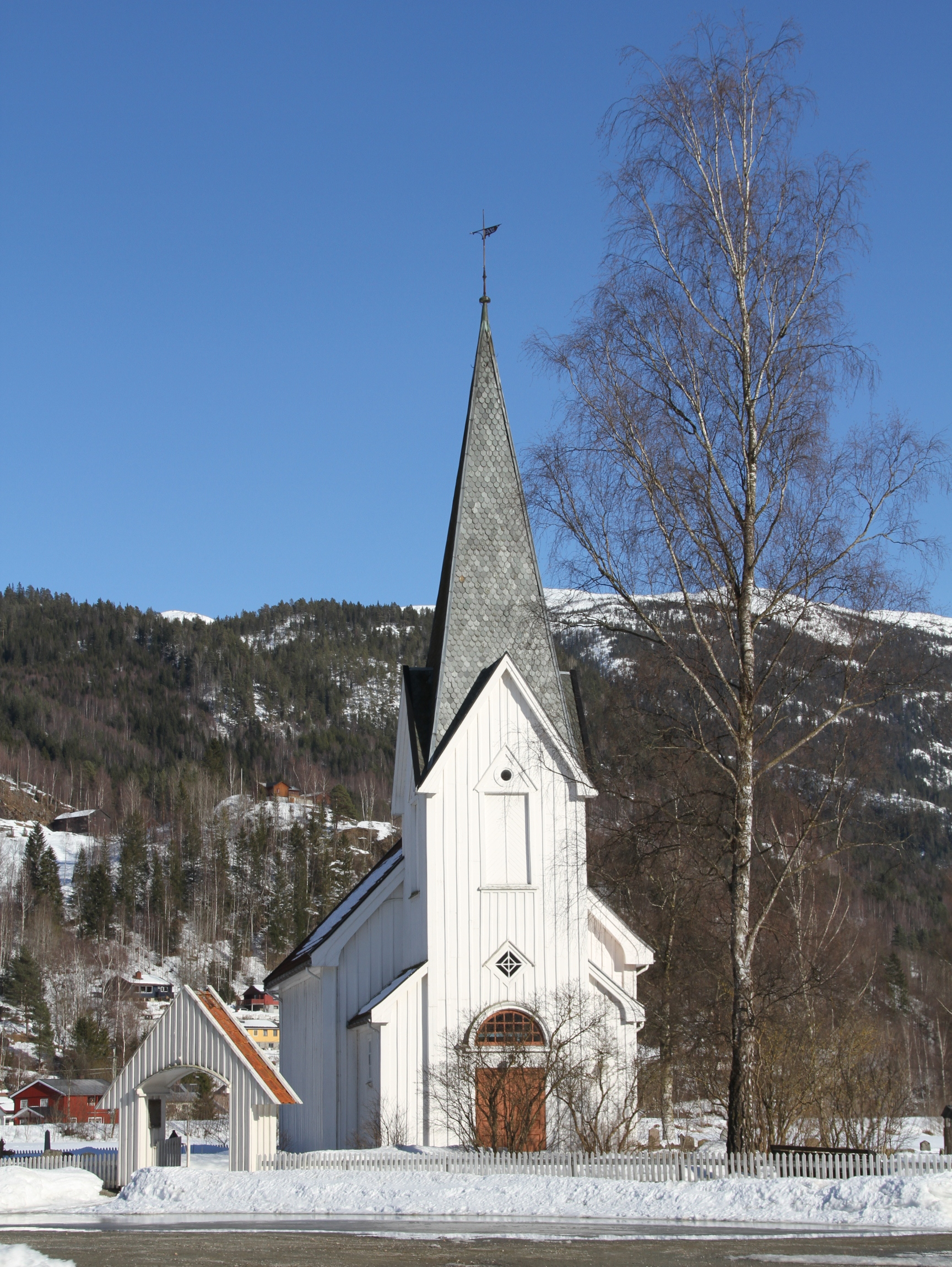
- View of the church
- Flatdal Church
- 59°33′39″N 8°34′20″E
- Location: Seljord Municipality, Telemark
- Country: Norway
- Denomination: Church of Norway
- Previous denomination: Catholic Church
- Churchmanship: Evangelical Lutheran

History
- Status: Parish church
- Founded: 13th century
- Consecrated: 29 October 1654

Architecture
- Functional status: Active
- Architectural type: Long church
- Completed: 1654 (372 years ago)

Specifications
- Capacity: 160
- Materials: Wood

Administration
- Diocese: Agder og Telemark
- Deanery: Øvre Telemark prosti
- Parish: Seljord
- Norwegian Cultural Heritage Site
- Type: Church
- Status: Automatically protected
- ID: 84158

Flatdal Church (Norwegian: Flatdal kyrkje) is a parish church of the Church of Norway in Seljord Municipality in Telemark county, Norway. It is located in the village of Flatdal. It is one of the churches for the Seljord parish which is part of the Øvre Telemark prosti (deanery) in the Diocese of Agder og Telemark. The white, wooden church was built in a long church design in 1654 using plans drawn up by an unknown architect. The church seats about 160 people.

== History ==
The earliest existing historical records of the church date back to the year 1529, but the church was not built that year. The first church in Flatdal was a wooden stave church. Not much is known about the old church, but there is a crucifix in the present church that is dated to the 13th century, and it is believed that this crucifix was from the old stave church, so it's likely that the old church was built during the 13th century. By the mid-1600s, the old church was in poor condition, so it was torn down in 1653. A new long church was built on the same site in 1653–1654. Some of the good timber from the old church was reused in the construction of the new church. The new church was consecrated on 29 October 1654. In 1723, the church was sold into private ownership during the Norwegian church sale which the King used to pay off debts incurred during the Great Northern War. In 1873, the parish purchased the church building from its private owner. After this, the church underwent a renovation. In 1908, the present bell tower and church porch were constructed on the west end of the building and a sacristy on the east end of the chancel. In 1952, the church interior was redecorated, reinstalling some of the old fixtures and items that were found in the attic.

== Media gallery ==
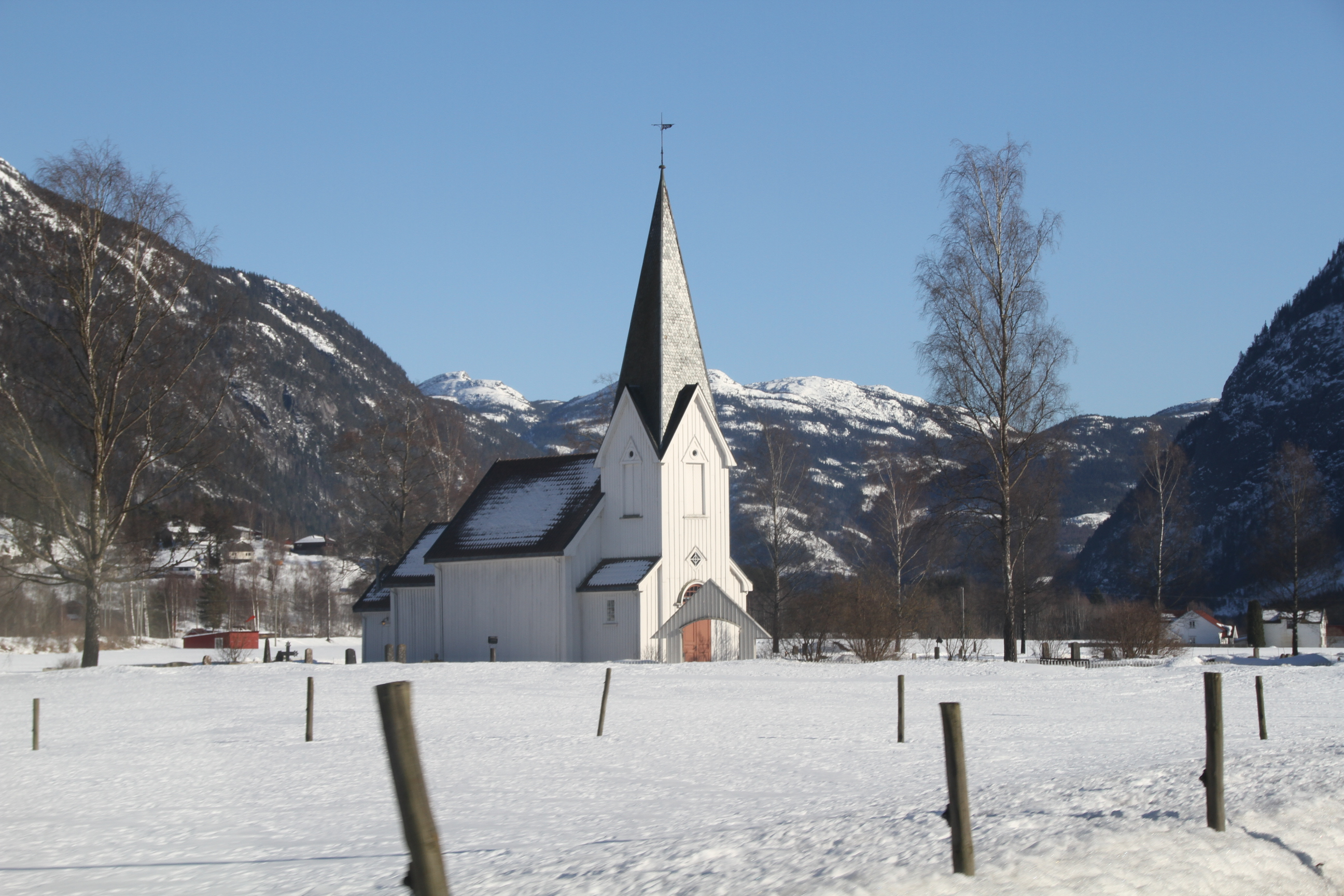

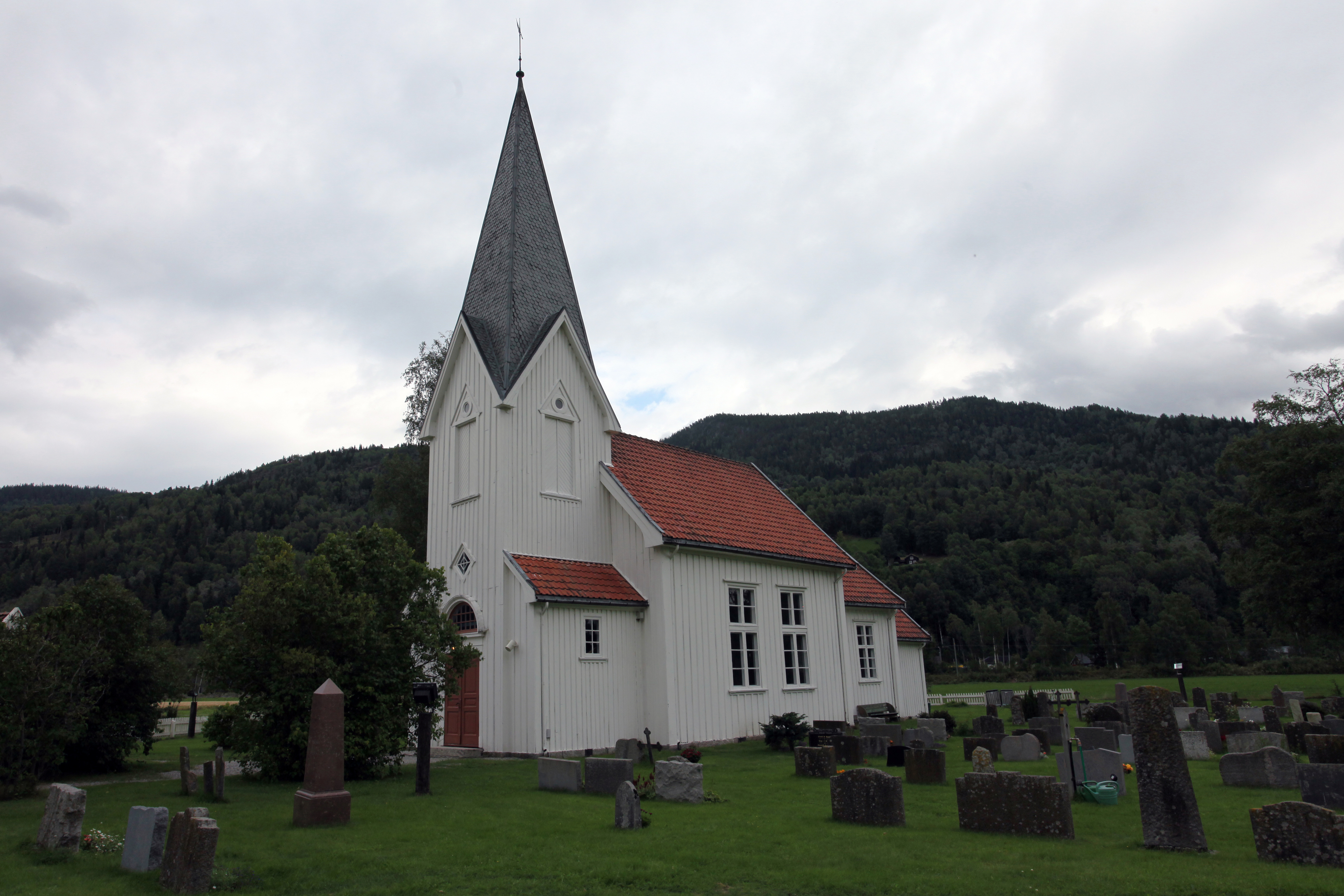

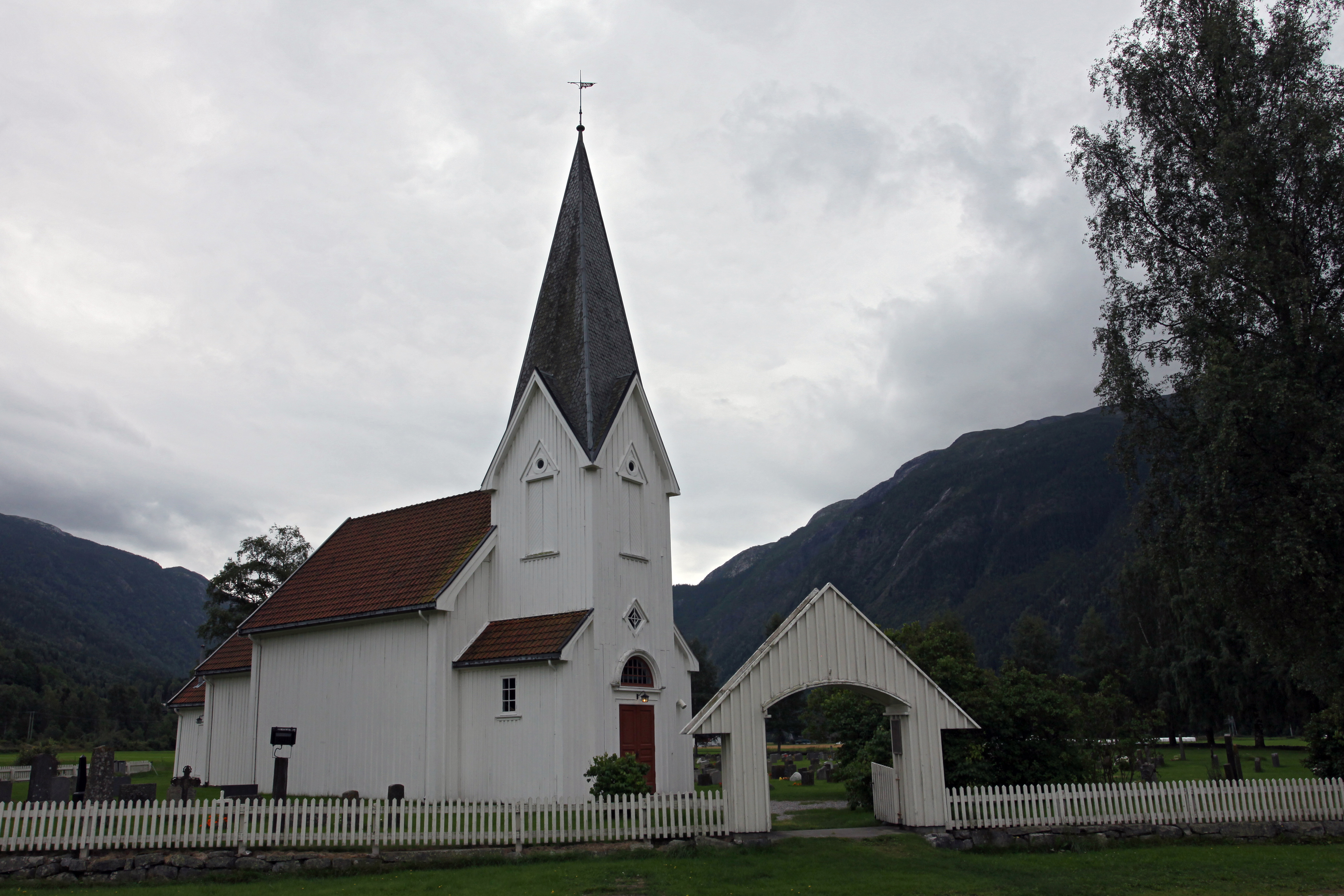

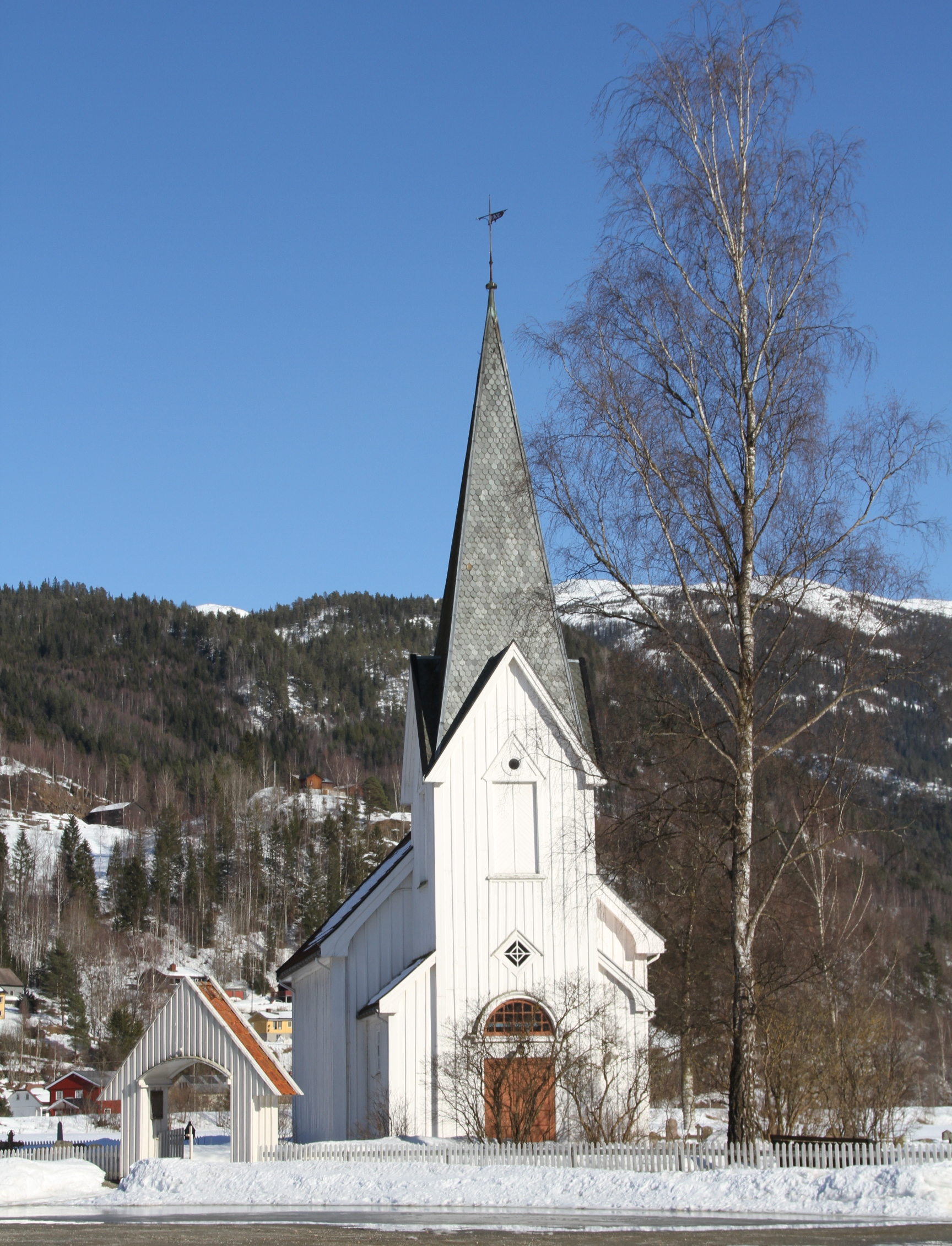

== See also ==
- List of churches in Agder og Telemark
