= Solholm =

Solholm is a given name and surname. Notable people with the name include:

- Lodve Solholm, Norwegian politician
- Sondre Solholm Johansen (born 1995), Norwegian footballer
