= Romnes Church =

Church in Telemark, Norway

- Romnes kyrkje
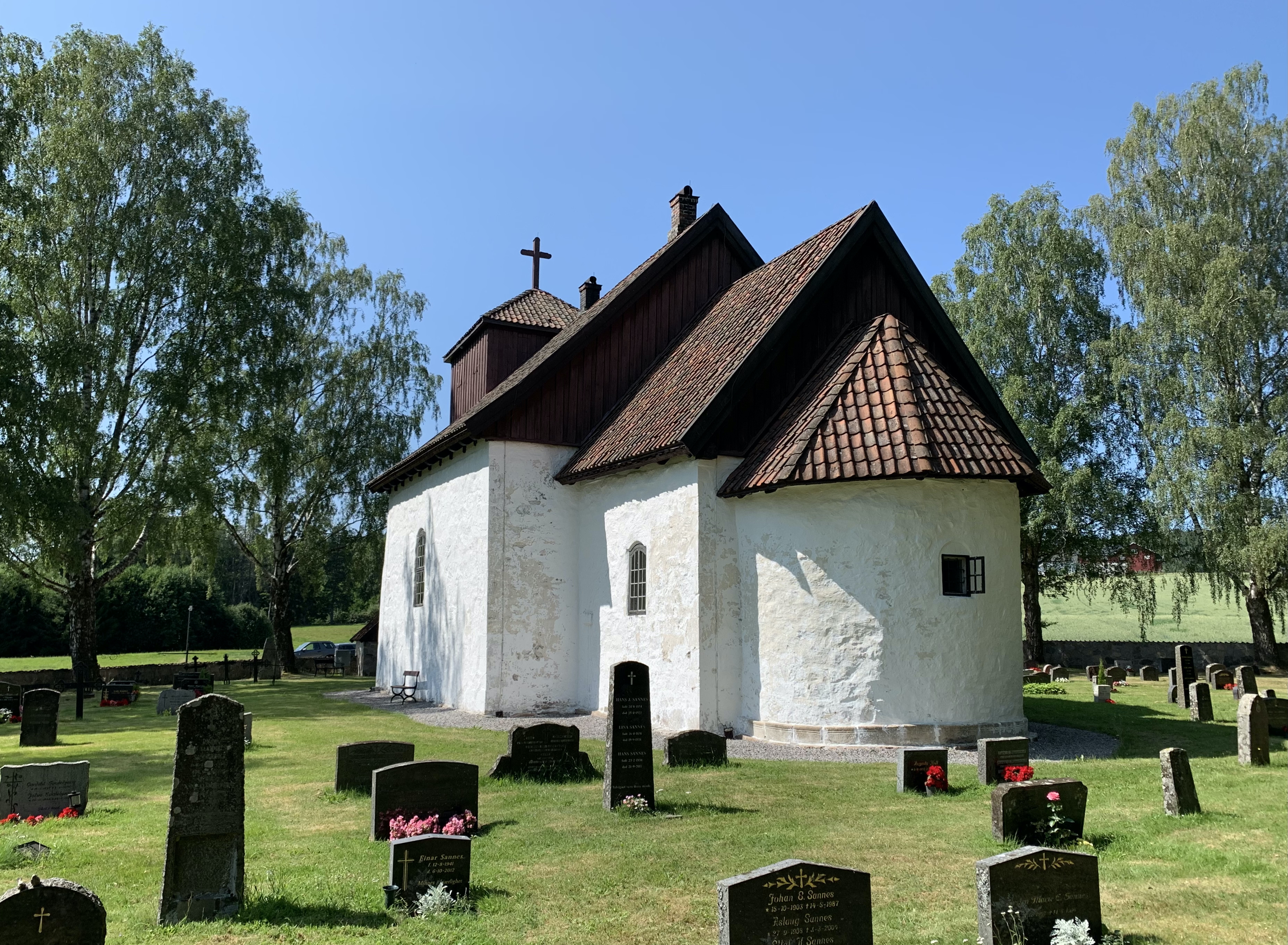
- View of the church
- Romnes Church
- 59°17′51″N 9°16′31″E
- Location: Nome Municipality, Telemark
- Country: Norway
- Denomination: Church of Norway
- Previous denomination: Catholic Church
- Churchmanship: Evangelical Lutheran

History
- Status: Parish church
- Founded: 12th century
- Consecrated: 26 September (year unknown)
- Events: 1867: taken out of regular use

Architecture
- Functional status: Inactive
- Architectural type: Long church
- Style: Romanesque
- Completed: c. 1150 (876 years ago)

Specifications
- Capacity: 100
- Materials: Stone

Administration
- Diocese: Agder og Telemark
- Deanery: Øvre Telemark prosti
- Parish: Holla og Helgen
- Norwegian Cultural Heritage Site
- Type: Church
- Status: Automatically protected
- ID: 85315

Romnes Church (Norwegian: Romnes kyrkje) is a parish church of the Church of Norway in Nome Municipality in Telemark county, Norway. It is located in the village of Romnes. It is one of the churches for the Holla og Helgen parish which is part of the Øvre Telemark prosti (deanery) in the Diocese of Agder og Telemark. The white, stone church was built in a long church design around the year 1100 using plans drawn up by an unknown architect. The church seats about 100 people. The church was taken out of regular use in 1867 and since then, it has been used for special occasions and a few summer worship services each year.

== History ==
The earliest existing historical records of the church date back to the year 1338, but that is not the year the church was built. The Romanesque stone long church was built in the late 1100s, sometime after the year 1150. It was originally dedicated to St. Lavrans. The church was consecrated on 26 September, but the year is unknown. As with most medieval churches in Norway, the nave and choir are in clearly separated rooms with a relatively narrow opening between them. Like many medieval churches in Eastern Norway, Romnes does not have any windows in the north wall. The chancel originally had a south portal, but was closed and walled up at some point. Some time during the 19th century, a church porch and bell tower were built at the west portal. Prior to this time, there had been a small tower on the roof of the nave which was removed when the new tower was completed. The choir has a semi-circular apse on the east end. The internal measurements of the nave are 11 by 10 metres (36 ft × 33 ft) with 1.45-metre (4 ft 9 in) thick walls. The choir is 5.7 by 6.7 metres (19 ft × 22 ft) wide. The wall thickness in the choir is 1.25 metres (4 ft 1 in). The diameter of the apse is 6.15 metres (20.2 ft).

After the Black Death in Norway, the church fell into severe disrepair. There is some evidence that implies that parts of the church walls may have collapsed during this time. After the Reformation, the church was changed in several ways. The windows were probably enlarged, and pews and a second floor galleries were added. The Great Northern War emptied the royal treasury, and then in 1723, King Frederick IV, held the Norwegian church sale and many churches to raise money to pay off his debts. Romnes Church was purchased by the provost Peder Alstrup from Bamble. Alstrup sold the church on 30 December 1734 to the local ironworks factory owner Herman Leopoldus of the Løvenskiold family.

In 1833, the current factory owner, Eggert Løvenskiold, sold the church to the State, which in turn let it pass into private hands to factory owner Diderik von Cappelen. By the mid-1800s, the local population had grown, and the three local churches (Holla Church, Helgen Church, and Romnes Church) were all quite small and in fairly poor condition. The local factory owner owned all three churches and he offered to give them to the municipality for free around 1850 in return for the municipality also taking over responsibility for all the maintenance of the old buildings. The municipality refused the offer. In 1860, there was a large flood and the local population helped to save the factory from flood damage. After this, the factory owner Cappelen agreed to finance the construction of the new Holla Church. When this new, larger, modern church was completed in 1867, the old Romnes Church was closed. The church was then handed over to the local landowner Niels Aall who undertook to maintain the building. The building was initially left untouched, but in 1921, the church was restored. Domenico Erdmann removed some of the modern paint on the walls and uncovered old drapery paintings on the walls of the choir from the 1450s. In 1932, Finn Krafft decorated the ceiling and walls of the main entrance and repeated motifs from these drapery paintings. The church was restored again in the 1970s after extensive damage from Old house borer beetles. The municipality took over ownership of the church from the Aall family in 1986 (this family had owned the church building for many, many years). Currently, the church remains a part of the parish, but it is no longer in regular use. The church is used for several special services during the summer each year in addition to special occasions such as weddings or special events.

== Media gallery ==
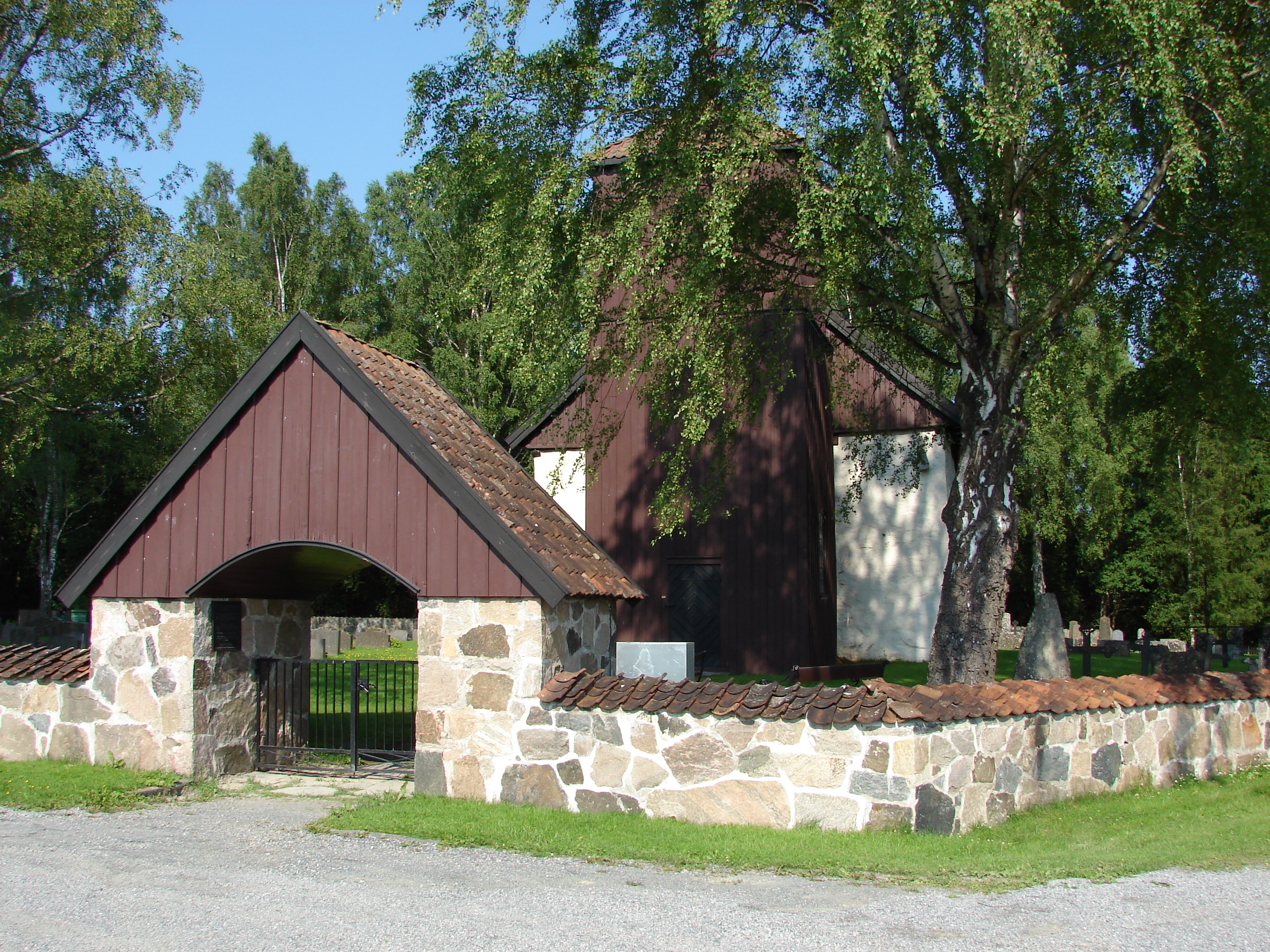

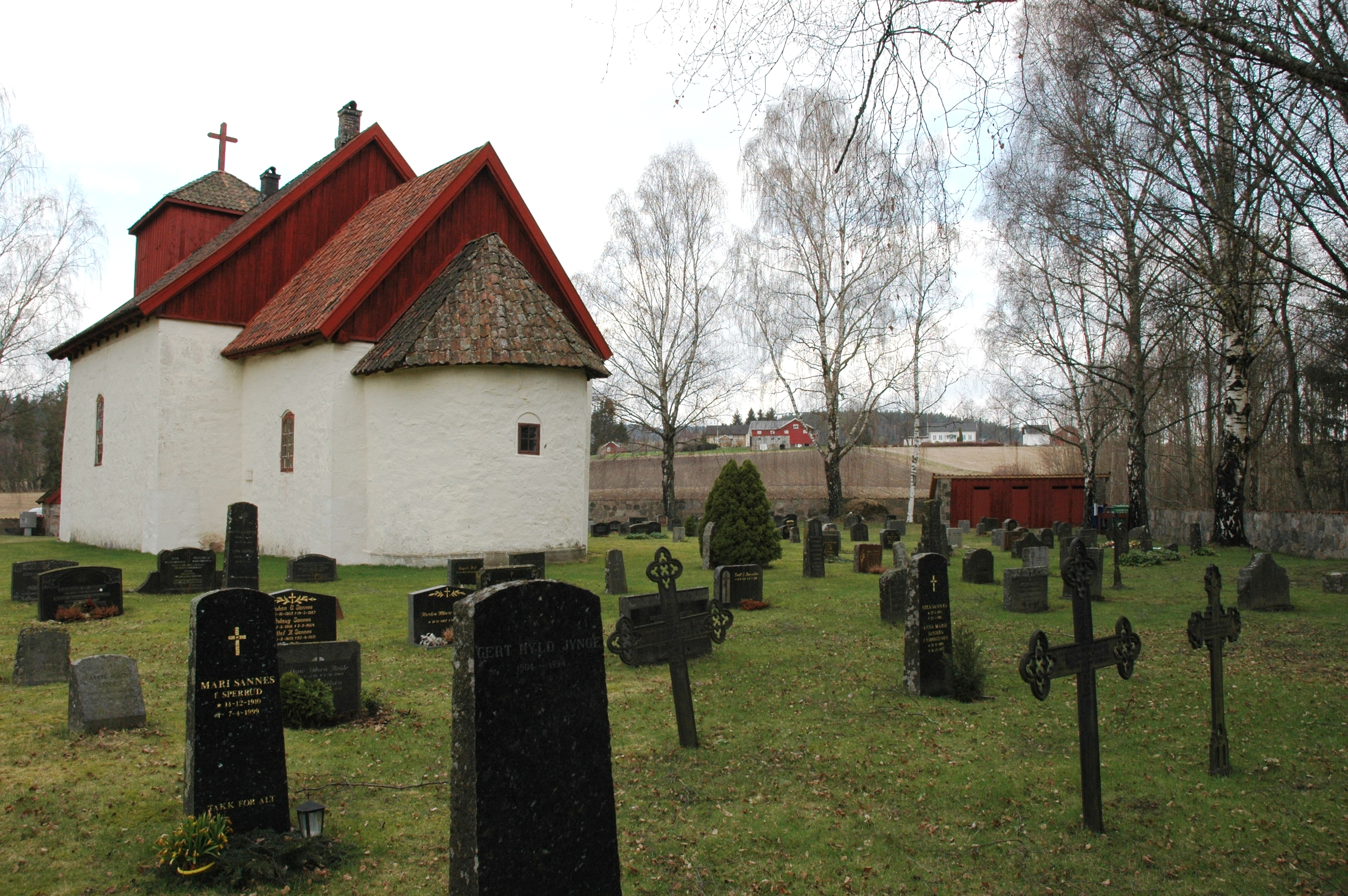

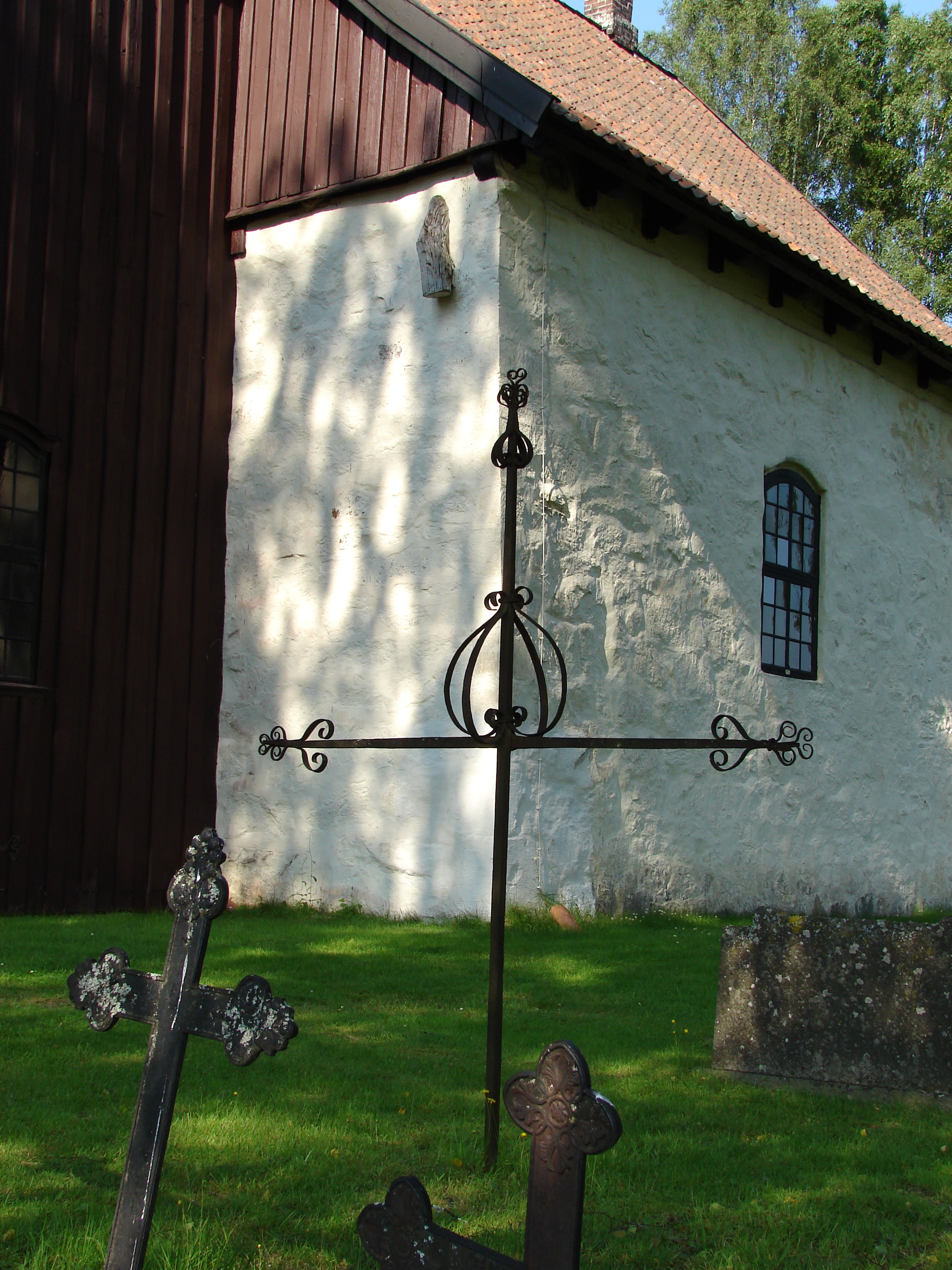

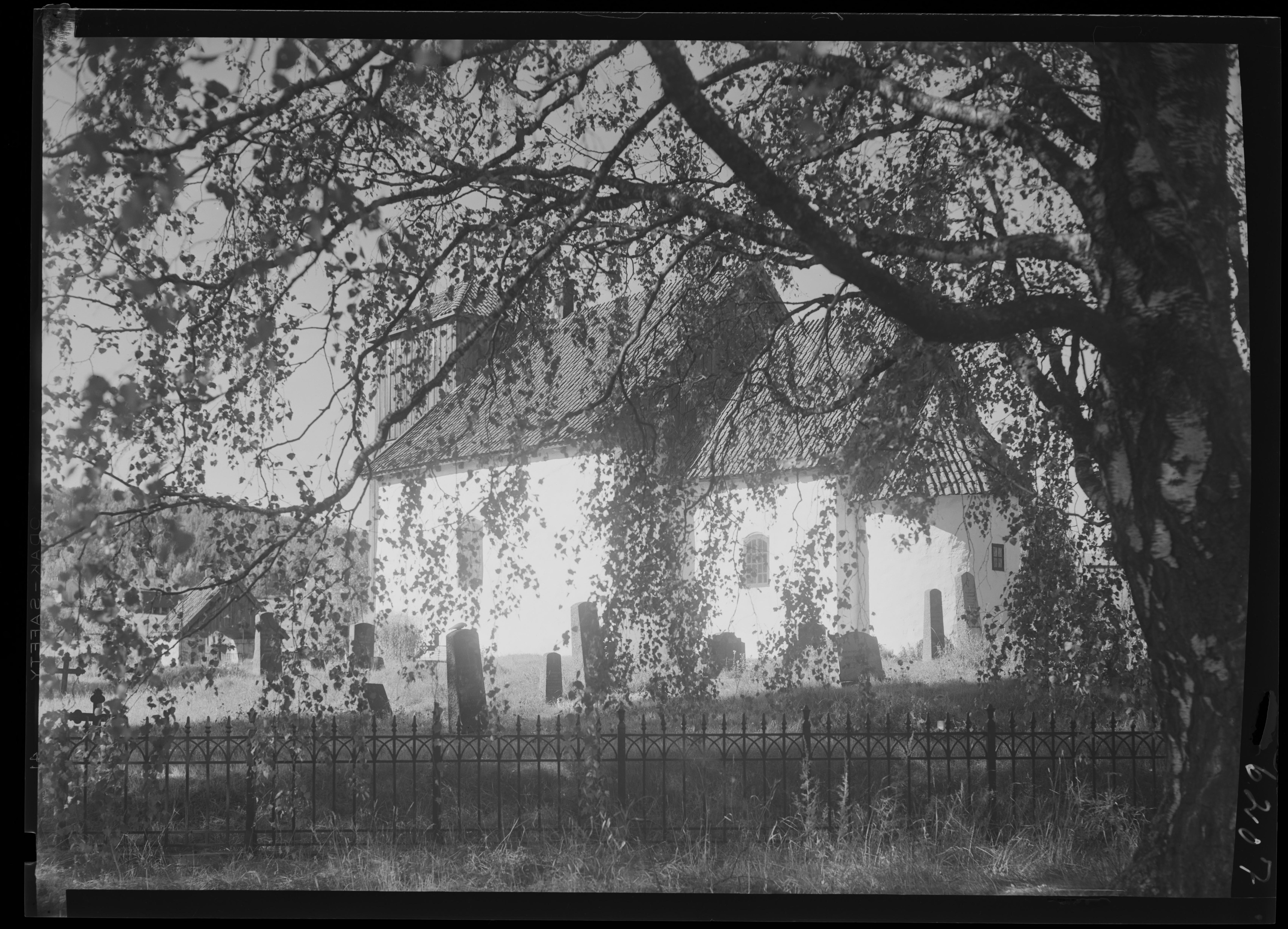

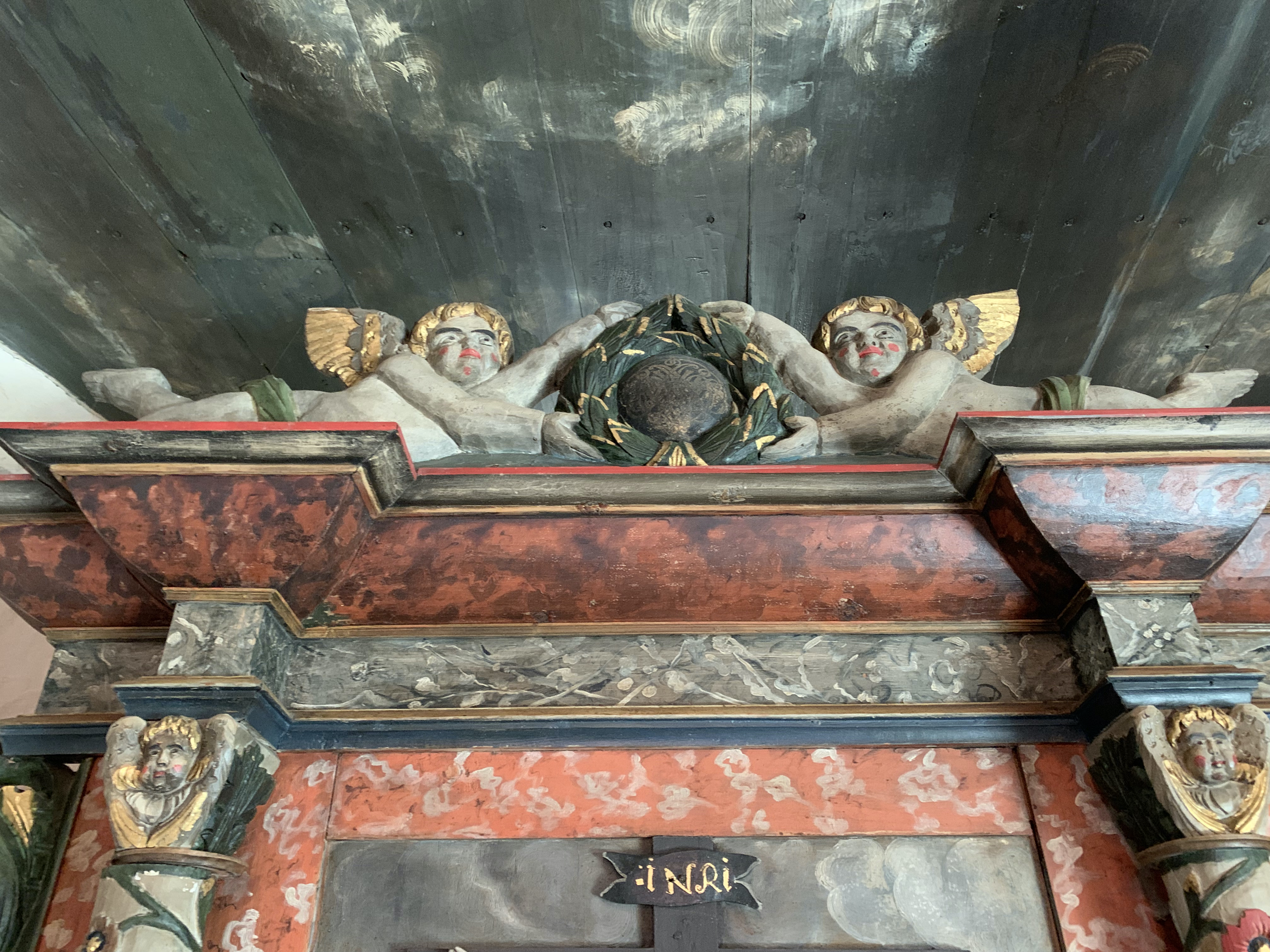

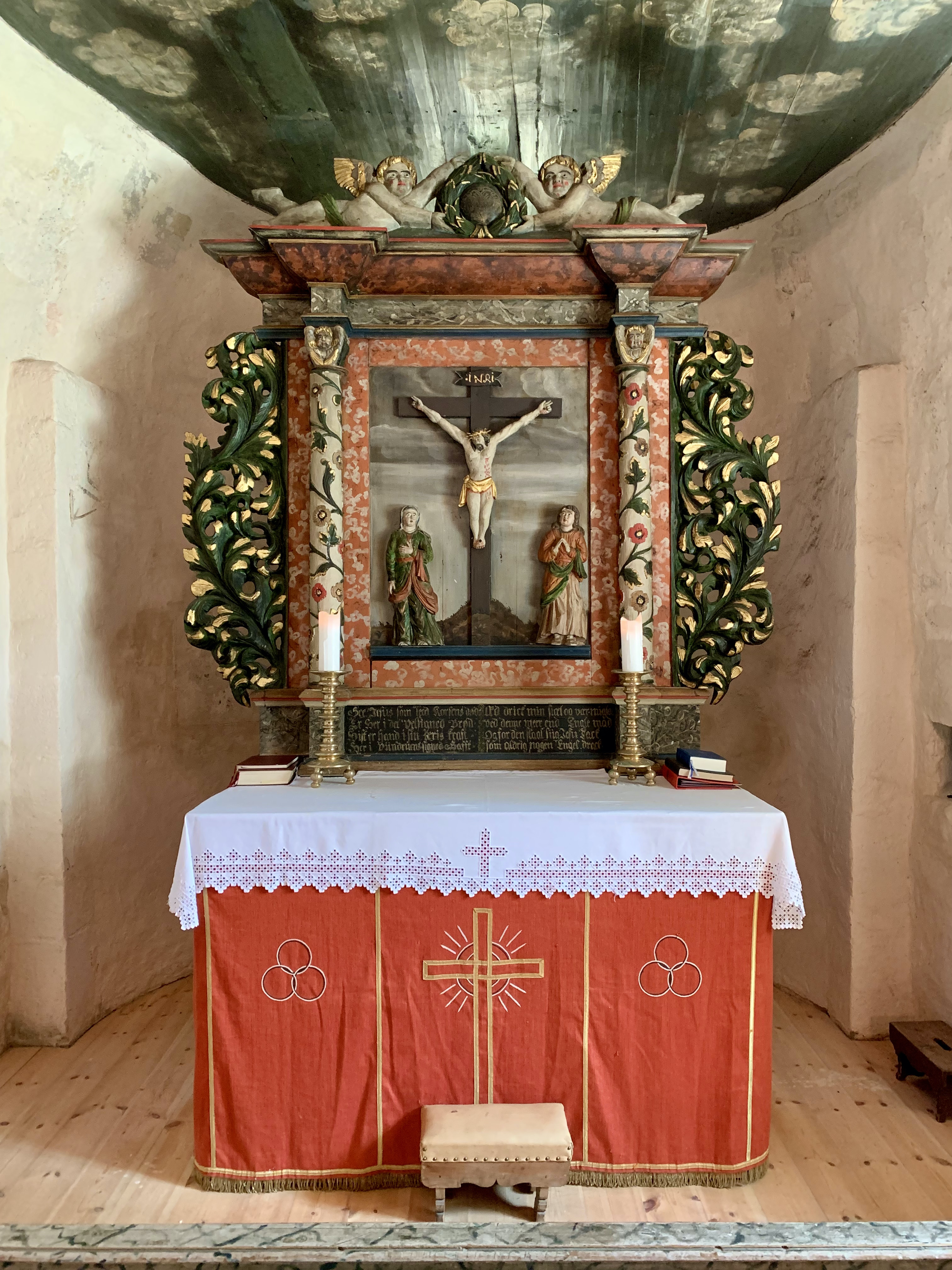

== See also ==
- List of churches in Agder og Telemark
