= Holla Church =

Church in Telemark, Norway

- Holla kirke
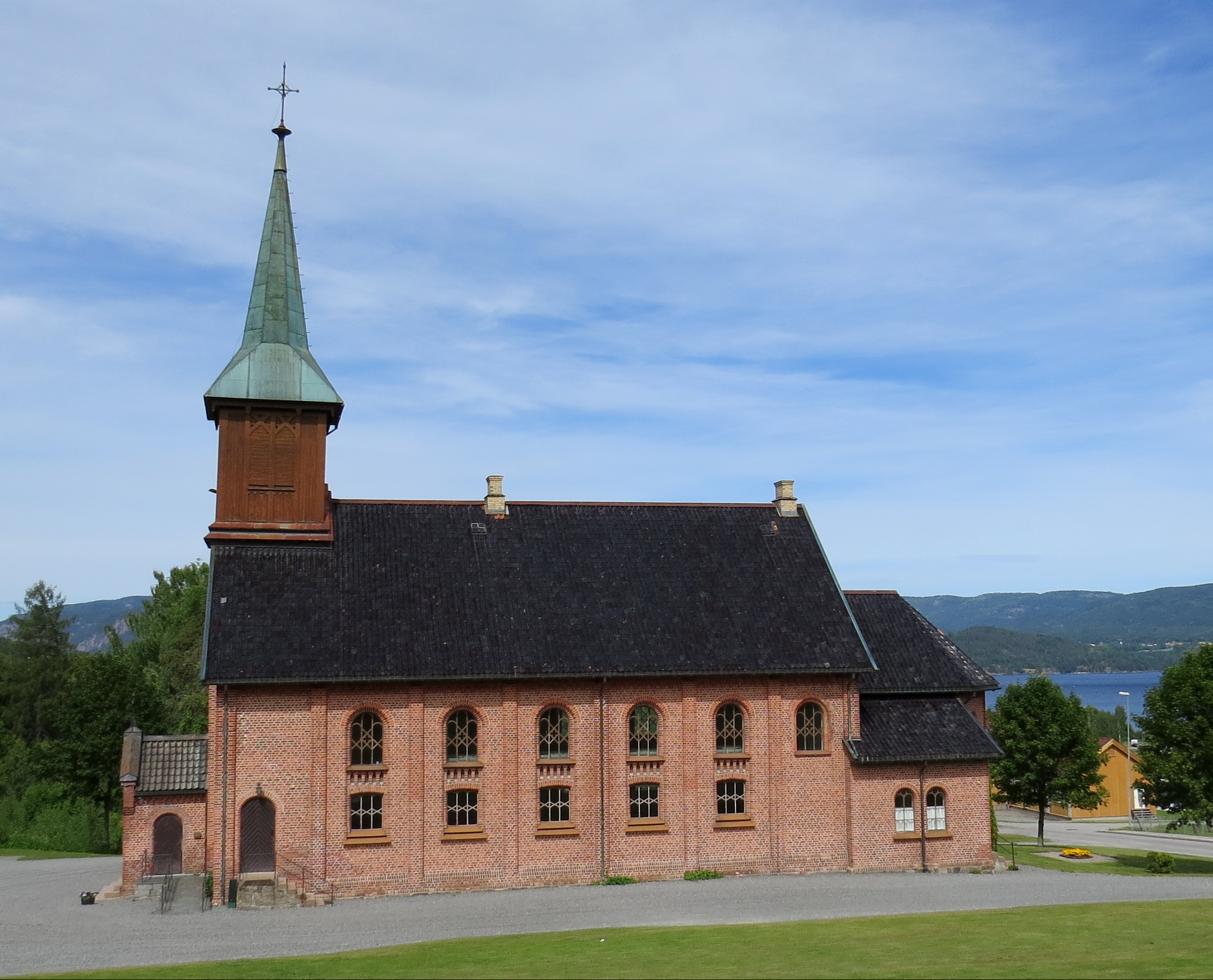
- View of the church
- Holla Church
- 59°16′50″N 9°15′47″E
- Location: Nome Municipality, Telemark
- Country: Norway
- Denomination: Church of Norway
- Previous denomination: Catholic Church
- Churchmanship: Evangelical Lutheran

History
- Status: Parish church
- Founded: c. 1100
- Consecrated: 25 September 1867

Architecture
- Functional status: Active
- Architect: Peter Høier Holtermann
- Architectural type: Long church
- Completed: 1867 (159 years ago)

Specifications
- Capacity: 360
- Materials: Brick

Administration
- Diocese: Agder og Telemark
- Deanery: Øvre Telemark prosti
- Parish: Holla og Helgen
- Norwegian Cultural Heritage Site
- Type: Church
- Status: Listed
- ID: 84598

Holla Church (Norwegian: Holla kirke) is a parish church of the Church of Norway in Nome Municipality in Telemark county, Norway. It is located in the village of Ulefoss. It is one of the churches for the Holla og Helgen parish which is part of the Øvre Telemark prosti (deanery) in the Diocese of Agder og Telemark. The red, brick church was built in a long church design in 1867 using plans drawn up by the architect Peter Høier Holtermann. The church seats about 360 people.

== History ==
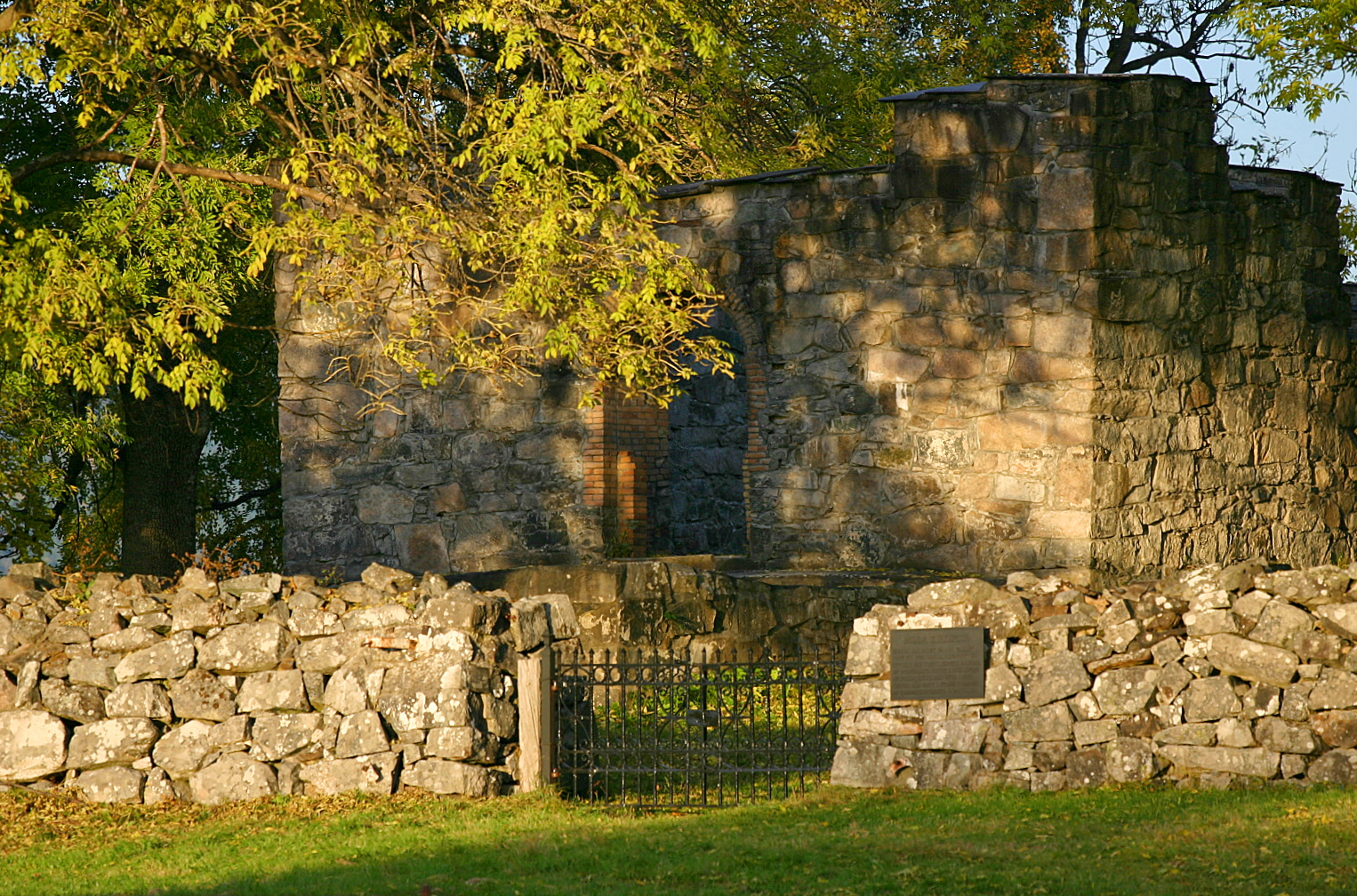
View of the ruins of the old church

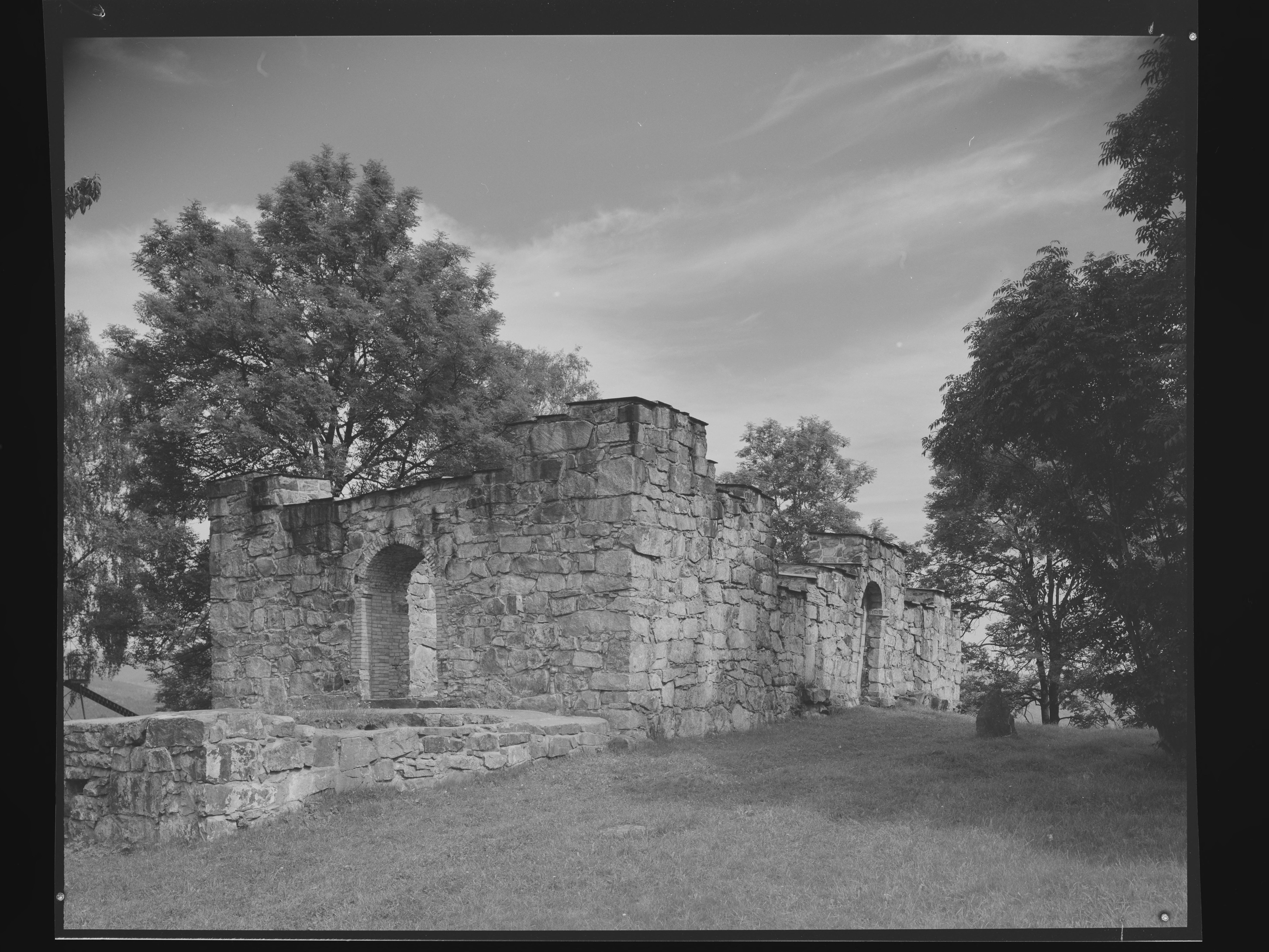
View of the ruins of the old church

The earliest existing historical records of the church date back to the end of the 14th century, but this is not when the church was built. The first church in Holla was a small stone church located on a site about 1.2 kilometres (0.75 mi) to the southeast of the present church site. It is assumed on the basis of the style of the building that it was built around the year 1100, although the exact year is not known. The church was consecrated on 28 October (year unknown) and the church was dedicated to the Virgin Mary. The nave of the church was 8.1 by 6.3 metres (27 ft × 21 ft) (originally only half that length) with walls that were about 1 metre (3 ft 3 in) thick. The choir measured about 4.5 by 5.5 metres (15 ft × 18 ft). It is said that the foundation of the church was poor, and around the year 1700, the oldest part of the church was said to be quite dilapidated. In 1718, the choir portion of the building collapsed. The Great Northern War emptied the royal treasury, and then in 1723, King Frederick IV, held the Norwegian church sale and many churches to raise money to pay off his debts. The church was purchased by the Borse and Løvenskiold families, who also owned the local ironworks factory. In 1735, the new owners repaired and expanded the building. The church was given a larger nave and a new wooden choir, sacristy, and church porch were added. The entire church was redecorated and furnished with new furniture. Among these was a new altarpiece (which can now be found at the Norwegian Folk Museum. There was also a burial chamber under the church.

In 1814, this church served as an election church (Norwegian: valgkirke). Together with more than 300 other parish churches across Norway, it was a polling station for elections to the 1814 Norwegian Constituent Assembly which wrote the Constitution of Norway. This was Norway's first national elections. Each church parish was a constituency that elected people called "electors" who later met together in each county to elect the representatives for the assembly that was to meet at Eidsvoll Manor later that year.

In 1833, the current church owner, Eggert Løvenskiold, sold the church to the State, which in turn let it pass into private hands to factory owner Diderik von Cappelen. By the mid-1800s, the local population had grown, and the three local churches (Holla Church, Helgen Church, and Romnes Church) were all quite small and in fairly poor condition. The local factory owner owned all three churches and he offered to give them to the municipality for free around 1850 in return for the municipality also taking over responsibility for all the maintenance of the old buildings. The municipality refused the offer which led to a dispute between the local government and the church owner. In 1860, there was a large flood and the local population helped to save the factory from flood damage. After this, the factory owner Cappelen agreed to finance the construction of a new Holla Church building.

Peter Høier Holtermann was hired to design the new church, and the parish decided to build the new church about 1.2 kilometres (0.75 mi) to the northwest, in a location in the centre of the village of Ulefoss which would be more accessible to the growing village. The new brick church was consecrated on 25 September 1867. After the new church was put into use, the old Holla Church and the old Romnes Church were both closed. The furniture and inventory from the old Holla Church was moved to the new church or into museums. The old building was partially torn down in 1878 and afterwards, the rest fell into disrepair and is now a ruin.

The new Holla Church is a brick long church. The church has a tower at the entrance in the west and the choir has a half-octagon-shaped apse on the east end surrounded by vestries. In 1916, a baptismal sacristy was built. The church was completely renovated in 1930. Also for the centennial anniversary in 1967, there was another round of renovations. The church was refurbished again in the early 1990s. While working on this project, it was discovered that the floor had been compromised by rot and the whole floor needed to be replaced.

== See also ==
- List of churches in Agder og Telemark
