= Matsdal =

Matsdal Gajhrege
- Village
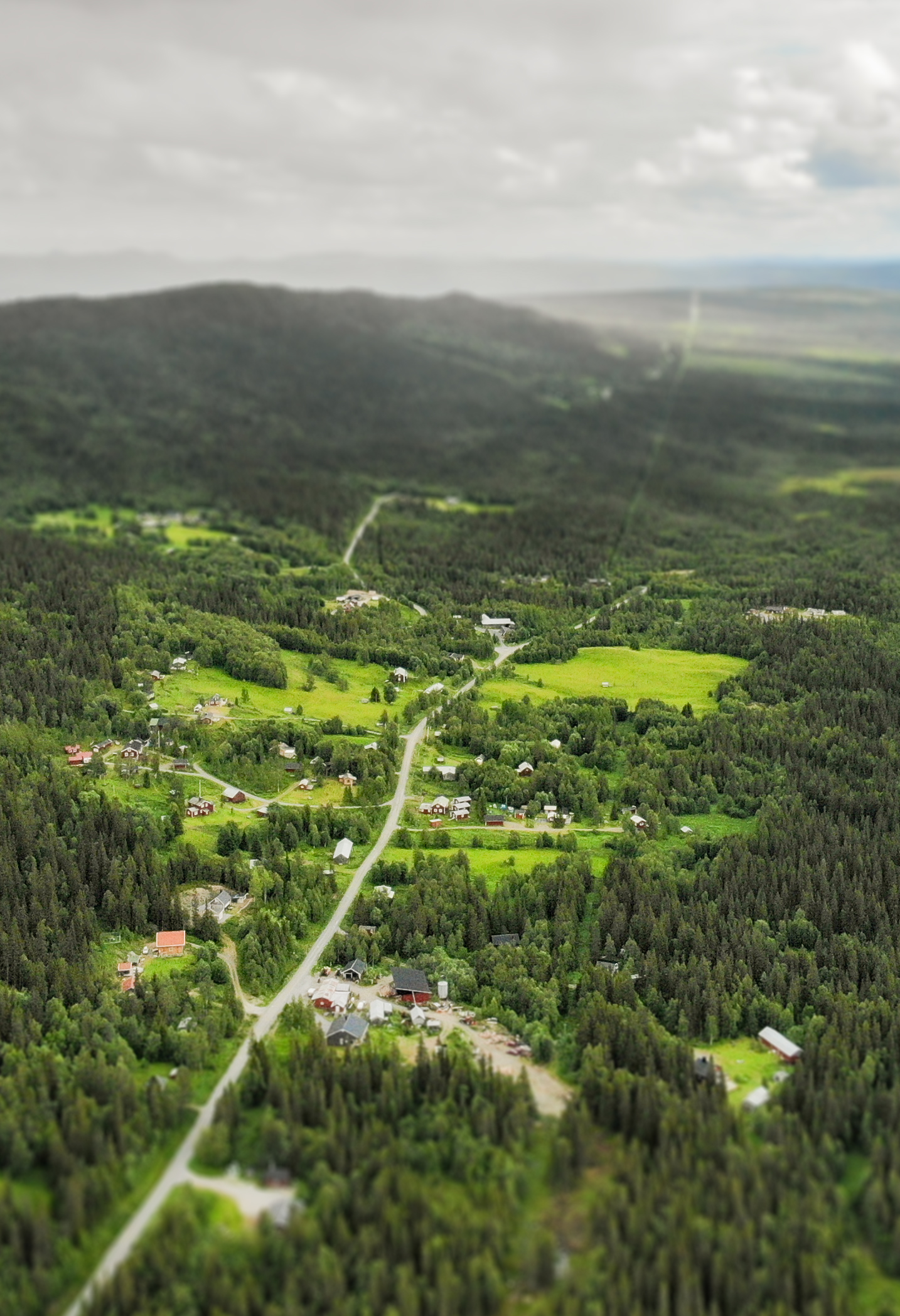
- Eastern Matsdal

- Location within Västerbotten
- Coordinates: 65°20′43″N 15°51′56″E
- Country: Sweden
- Province: Lapland
- County: Västerbotten County
- Municipality: Vilhelmina Municipality
- First settled: 1817
- Founder: Mattias Hansson Bjur
- Time zone: UTC+1 (CET)
  - Summer (DST): UTC+2 (CEST)
- Postal code: 92394
- Website: visitvilhelmina.com/resmal/dikanas/

Matsdal (Swedish pronunciation: [matsdɑːl]; Southern Sámi: Gajhrege or Gajhtohke). is a village in northwestern Sweden, located 90 kilometers northwest of Vilhelmina in Västerbotten County within the province of Lapland. The majority of the village, with exception for Southern Matsdal, is situated along a valley between southern and northern Gardfjäll fell.

Although the village has maintained a small permanent population, the area has become increasingly popular for recreational purposes, particularly among outdoor enthusiasts for its numerous fishing waters, snowmobile trails, and hiking paths. This shift in usage has led to a significant portion of the housing in the area being used as seasonal or vacation residences.

The village was established in 1817 by the settler Mattias Hansson Bjur and his wife Elisabet Andersdotter. They had traveled for an extended period from Dalarna County before finally settling and breaking new ground in this remote mountain valley. The surrounding areas have a long history of indigenous Sámi reindeer herding, with the earliest known records dating back to 1739.

== History ==
=== Early history ===
There are no known sources that suggests that the area where the village was later founded had been inhabited or had undergone any previous settlement attempts. At the time of the settlement's establishment, the location was known by the Southern Sámi name Gaitokdal, a designation whose spelling varied considerably among different early sources.

According to a decree issued September 1, 1817, by the Royal County Administrator (Kunglig Majestäts befallningshavande) in Västerbotten, the area was part of the Sámi Sjul Andersson's taxed land (lappskatteland). On June 18 of the same year the crown district police chief, Nils Petter Degerman, accompanied by two jurymen, conducted an inspection of the site. During this inspection, the residence, arable land, and forest were meticulously measured and recorded. Sjul Andersson, the previous landowner, could not be located at the time of the inspection. However, Degerman noted that Andersson likely had no objections to the settlement, as there was no nearby access to fishing waters, and no such claims had been made.

=== The first settlers ===
==== Early life and military service ====
Mattias Hansson Bjur, also known as Mats Bjur or Mattes Bjur, was born on December 26, 1768, in the village of Sörskog, Bjursås parish, Kopparberg County, Sweden. He was recruited into the Ovansjö Company as a soldier on September 15, 1790, and served in the Hälsinge Regiment for over 11 years before requesting discharge on September 10, 1801, due to a knee injury and subsequent illness.

==== Migration to Västerbotten and later life ====
After his discharge, Mattias began a gradual northward journey with his wife, Elisabet Andersdotter, and their two sons, Hans and Anders. Around 1806, he worked briefly at Håknäs sawmill in Ångermanland. By this time, the family had expanded with the birth of a daughter. They continued their journey and eventually settled in Resele parish around 1809, where they remained until 1816. In 1817, the family arrived in Vilhelmina parish and settled in a location initially called Lillkittelfjäll, now known as Henriksfjäll. The parish records indicate that their arrival was not officially sanctioned by the local community, likely due to their limited resources.

Mattias's time as a settler was ultimately cut short when he froze to death on November 30, 1825, at the northern end of Lake Volgsjön, at a location later named Bjurviken. By then, the settlement "Mattiasdal" had already been divided among his children, with his son Hans Mattsson and daughter Elisabet Mattsdotter taking over.

=== Development of the village ===
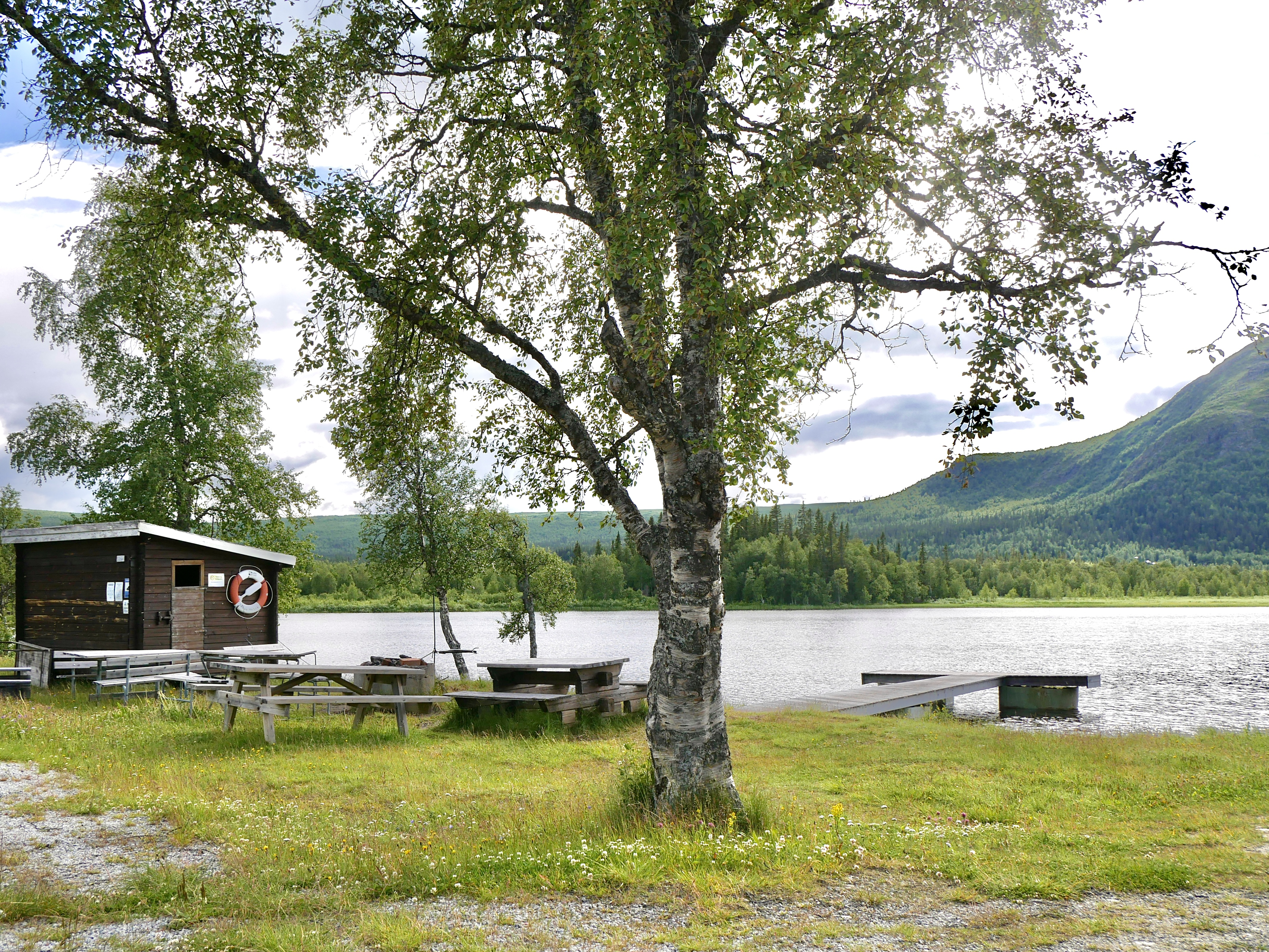
Rest area by Lilljsön with a swimming and fishing pier, as well as a fire pit and changing booth.

==== Infrastructure and agricultural improvements ====
Agriculture was the primary livelihood in the village, supplemented by hunting and fishing. Early farming tools were rudimentary, but by the early 20th century, more advanced equipment like iron plows and threshing machines were introduced. The village also had several water-powered mills for grinding grain. Postal and telephone services also developed over time. Regular postal service began in 1910, and the first fixed telephone line was installed in 1918. By 1933, a road connecting Matsdal to nearby village Dikanäs was completed, facilitating easier transport and communication with the rest of the country.

==== Technological advancements ====
During the 19th and early 20th centuries, technological advancements gradually reached the village. By the 1860s, kerosene lamps began to replace open fires and tallow candles. Roofs transitioned from birch bark and wooden shingles to more durable materials. The introduction of milk separators, rakes, and iron stoves in the 1890s significantly improved daily life and agricultural productivity. A water pipeline was installed in 1932, followed by the introduction of electricity on November 15, 1946.

== Geography ==
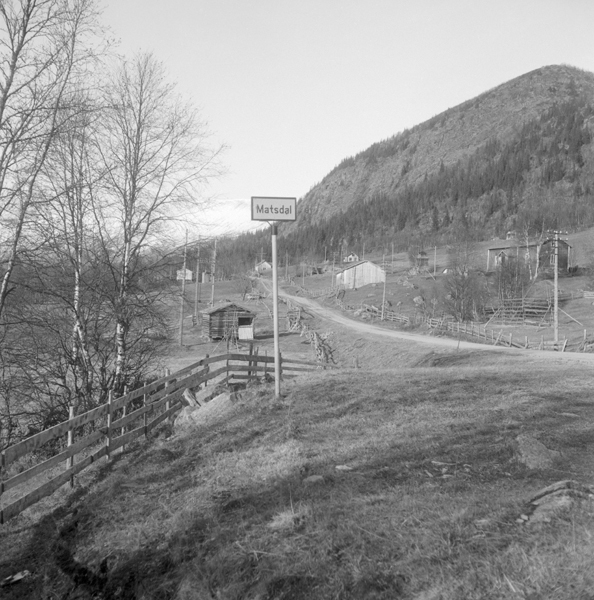
View towards Storknoppen mountain (Fell), as seen from the intersection towards Skansnäs.

Matsdal is situated in a valley located in Västerbotten County, Sweden. It extends for approximately 11 kilometers (6.8 miles) from the points of Kanan to Södra Matsdal, situated between the Southern and Northern Gardfjäll mountains (fell). The highest peak of Northern Gardfjäll, known as Gälta, reaches an elevation of 1,308 meters (4,291 feet) above sea level.

Southern Gardfjäll is part of a nature reserve covering an area of 38,886 hectares. The region is characterized by mountain valleys surrounded by steep mountains, ravines, and scree slopes. The mountain tops are often bare with exposed bedrock, referred to by the Sámi people as "klip," which is the origin of the area's Sámi name, Klipfjäll (Klipentjahke). The landscape of Södra Gardfjäll is diverse, featuring extensive mountain birch forests, winding waterways, clear lakes, small mires, and dense willow thickets. The mountain peaks in the area are steep and difficult to access.

Bullerbäcken is a stream located south of Kanan, flowing through a deep ravine and continuing through a narrow canyon lined with steep cliffs. This canyon is home to the Bullerfallen (Buller Falls), which cascade into a polished round basin. Downstream from the Buller Falls canyon, there is an area with numerous stone fields, smoothed and rounded by glacial meltwater. Further downstream, where the Matsdal-river expands into a valley, a delta has formed, consisting of a network of small streams.

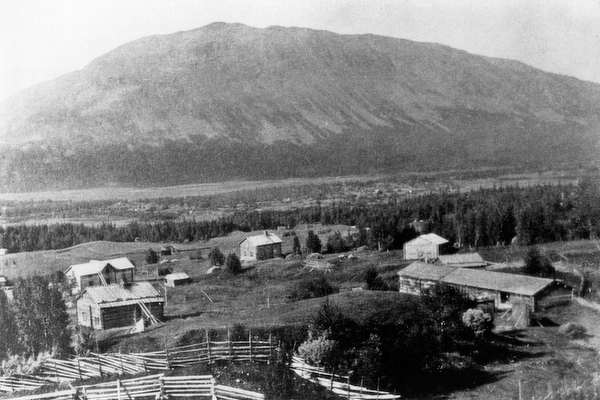
View towards Grapsan mountain (Fell).

The landscape is rich in traces and remnants of human activity over millennia. The reserve constitutes a Sámi cultural landscape shaped by reindeer herding and contains a high concentration of archaeological sites from various periods. Within the reserve, there are many now-abandoned settlements and reindeer enclosures. Additionally, the area includes several locations where farms and cottages were established and later abandoned during the 20th century.

=== Geographical history ===
The earliest known documents mentioning Gardfjäll are found in a series of protocol notes from an examination conducted in 1741. This examination, led by Peter Schnitler, involved questioning farmers and Sámi people from Helgeland, Norway, about border conditions and living circumstances. During this examination, Ioen Andersen, an elder from Susendal, testified about several Sámi individuals who paid poll tax in both Norway and Sweden. Among those mentioned was a man named Ole Siursen, associated with Arefjäll and Gardfjäll, is listed in a 1739 registry of tax-paying Sámi's.
