= Alv Jakob Fostervoll =

Norwegian politician

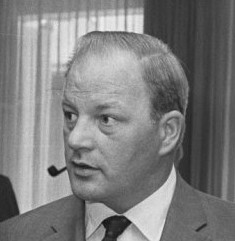
- Fostervoll in 1974

County Governor of Møre og Romsdal
- In office 1977–2001
- Preceded by: Kåre Ellingsgård
- Succeeded by: Ottar Befring

Minister of Defence
- In office 16 October 1973 – 15 January 1976
- Prime Minister: Trygve Bratteli
- Preceded by: Johan Kleppe
- Succeeded by: Rolf Hansen
- In office 17 March 1971 – 18 October 1972
- Prime Minister: Trygve Bratteli
- Preceded by: Gunnar Hellesen
- Succeeded by: Johan Kleppe

Member of the Norwegian Parliament for Møre og Romsdal
- In office 1 October 1969 – 30 September 1977
- Preceded by: Anders Sæterøy
- Succeeded by: Asbjørn Reidar Jordahl

Personal details
- Born: 20 January 1932 Kristiansund, Norway
- Died: 15 June 2015 (aged 83)
- Party: Labour

Alv Jakob Fostervoll (20 January 1932 – 15 June 2015) was a Norwegian politician for the Labour Party. He served as Norwegian Minister of Defence and Governor of Møre og Romsdal.

== Biography ==
Fostervoll was born at Kristiansund in Møre og Romsdal, Norway. He attended the teachers college in Volda and worked as a school teacher prior to entering politics. He held various political position in the municipal council for Kristiansund Municipality from 1959 to 1969, serving as deputy mayor in the period 1967–1969. From 1967 to 1969 he was also a member of Møre og Romsdal county council.

He was elected to the Parliament of Norway from Møre og Romsdal in 1969, and was re-elected on one occasion. He was appointed Minister of Defence in 1971–1972 during the first cabinet and in 1973–1976 during the second cabinet of Prime Minister, Trygve Bratteli. While he was appointed to the cabinet, his place in the Norwegian Parliament was taken by Oskar Edøy.

He was the president of the Norwegian Defense Association (Norges Forsvarsforening) from 1981 to 1989 and of the Norwegian Atlantic Committee from 1995 to 2007. His career in politics ended with the post of County Governor of Møre og Romsdal, which he held from 1977 to 2002.

== Honors ==
- Commander of the Order of St. Olav, 1995
- Commander of the 1st degree Order of the Dannebrog, 1993
- Commander of the Order of the Crown (Belgium), 1998
- King Olav Vs Jubilee Medal, 1957–1982, 1982

Government offices
| Preceded by Gunnar Hellesen | Norwegian Minister of Defence; 1971–1972 | Succeeded by Johan Kleppe |
| Preceded by Johan Kleppe | Norwegian Minister of Defence; 1973–1976 | Succeeded by Rolf Arthur Hansen |
| Preceded by Kåre Ellingsgård | County Governor of Møre og Romsdal; 1977–2002 | Succeeded by Ottar Befring |
