= Kristian Halse =

Norwegian politician

Kristian Halse (14 December 1926 in Stangvik Municipality – 6 November 2018) was a Norwegian politician for the Liberal Party.

He served as a deputy representative to the Norwegian Parliament from Nordland during the term 1969–1973. From 1972 to 1973 he sat as a regular representative, replacing Johan Kleppe who was appointed to the cabinet Korvald.

Halse was involved in local politics in Vefsn Municipality from 1962 to 1971.
