= Ottar Befring =

Norwegian politician (1939–2023)

Governor of Møre og Romsdal
- In office 2002–2009
- Preceded by: Alv Jakob Fostervoll
- Succeeded by: Lodve Solholm

Personal details
- Born: 19 November 1939 Jølster, Norway
- Died: 9 October 2023 (aged 83)
- Citizenship: Norway
- Party: Labour Party
- Profession: Politician

Ottar Befring (19 November 1939 – 9 October 2023) was a Norwegian lawyer and politician. He served as the County Governor of Møre og Romsdal county from 2002 until 2009.

Befring began his career in the armed forces of Norway in 1958. In 1966, he graduated from the Norwegian Military Academy and became an officer and served until 1978. After his retirement from the military, he moved back to the family farm in Stardalen in Jølster Municipality. As a farmer, he became involved in the local politics, eventually winning a seat on the local municipal council and the Sogn og Fjordane county council as well.

From 1992 to 1997, he worked at the Norwegian Ministry of Agriculture. In 1998, he became the agriculture director for Møre og Romsdal county. In 2002, he was appointed to be the County Governor of Møre og Romsdal county. He served as governor until his retirement in 2009.

Ottar Befring died on 9 October 2023, at the age of 83.

Government offices
Preceded by Alv Jakob Fostervoll	County Governor of Møre og Romsdal; 2002–2009	Succeeded by Lodve Solholm
