= Johan Kleppe =

Norwegian politician (1928–2022)

Minister of Defence
- In office 18 October 1972 – 16 October 1973
- Prime Minister: Lars Korvald
- Preceded by: Alv Fostervoll
- Succeeded by: Alv Fostervoll

State Secretary for the Ministry of Agriculture
- In office 1 January 1968 – 31 July 1969
- Prime Minister: Per Borten
- Minister: Bjarne Lyngstad

Member of the Norwegian Parliament
- In office 1 October 1969 – 30 September 1973
- Constituency: Nordland

Personal details
- Born: 29 September 1928 Bjørnskinn, Nordland, Norway
- Died: 17 May 2022 (aged 93)
- Party: Liberal

Johan Kleppe (29 September 1928 – 17 May 2022) was a Norwegian veterinarian and politician for the Liberal Party.

He was elected to the Norwegian Parliament from Nordland in 1969, but was not re-elected in 1973. He had previously served in the position of deputy representative during the term 1965–1969.

He was the Minister of Defence in 1972–1973 during the cabinet Korvald, having formerly been State Secretary to the Minister of Agriculture from 1968 to 1969 during the cabinet Borten. During his time in cabinet he was replaced in the Norwegian Parliament by Kristian Halse. Kleppe authored one book on defence policy, published in 1973.

On the local level he was member of the municipal council of Bjørnskinn Municipality from 1955 to 1963, and then its successor Andøy Municipality from 1963 to 1978, serving as deputy mayor from 1963 to 1966 and mayor from 1966 to 1969 and 1975 to 1978.

Kleppe died on 17 May 2022, at the age of 93.

Political offices
Preceded by Alv Fostervoll	Minister of Defence (Norway); 1972–1973	Succeeded by Alv Fostervoll
