= Gammel Strand 36 =

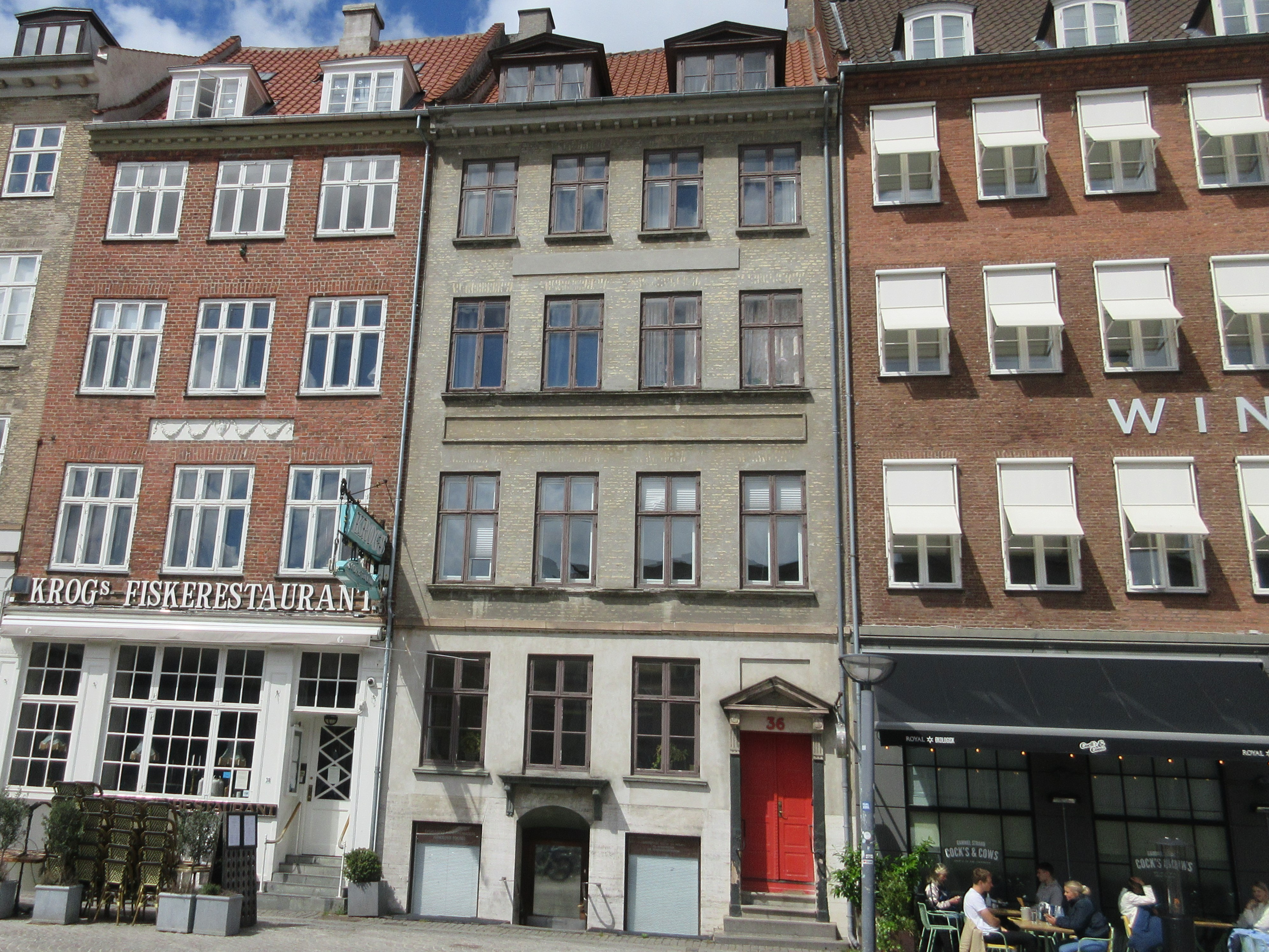
- Interactive map of Gammel Strand 36

General information
- Location: Copenhagen, Denmark
- Coordinates: 55°40′40.04″N 12°34′43.14″E
- Renovated: 1801

Gammel Strand 36 is a Neoclassical property overlooking Slotsholmen Canal in the Olt Town of Copenhagen, Denmark. The building was listed in the Danish registry of protected buildings and places in 1945. Notable former residents include the composer Franz Joseph Glæser.

== History ==
=== 17 and 18th century ===
The property belonged to Henrich Fuiren the Younger from at least the 1610s, He was buried on 16 October 1631. His widow Kirsten Pedersdatter ceded the property to her stepson Willum Fuiren. He kept the property until his death in 1664. The next owner was Marcus Silcke Krydenerer. On 16 December 1667, he mortgaged the property. On 18 May 1668, he also mortgaged some of the furnishings. On 9 August 1673, he ceded the property to goldsmith Jacob Kitzerou. The property was after his death owned by his widow Anne. Her property was listed in Copenhagen's first cadastre of 1689 as No. 9 in Strand Quarter. On 22 August 1701, she sold the property to Icelandic merchant Jørgen Jensen Klog. His widow was later married to Hans Hansen Nobel, prefect (amtmand) of Stavanger Amt. On 21 March 1715, he ceded the property to lawyer Kield Krag. After his death, on 27 February 1721, it was sold at auction to the estate of deceased Hans Willumsen. Ge had served as kandfoged on the Faroe Islands. On 27 March 1727, it was sold to mønsterskriver Jens Rasmussen.

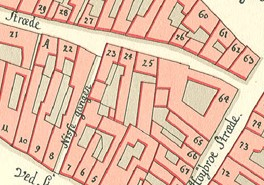
No. 9 seen on a detail from Christian Gedde's map of Strand Quarter, 1756.

The property continued all the way to Læderstræde on the other side of the block. After the Copenhagen Fire of 1728, it was divided into two properties. The property that faced the canal (now Gammel Strand 36) was again listed as No. 9 in the new cadastre of 1756 and was at that time owned by Johan Gotfreid Wagner. The property that faced Læderstræde was listed as No. 23 and belonged to harnessmaker Johan Jørgen Lytkeman.

At the time of the 1787 census, No. 9 was home to two households. Christian Wilhelm Mengs (1734-1799), administrator of the Royal Danish Cotton Manufactory (Kongl.Danske Bomulds Manufactur), resided in the building with his wife Anne Mengs, their two daughters (aged 14 and 21), two office clerks, a floor clerk and a maid. Maria Cathrina Klauman, a 36-year-old widow, resided in the building with a husjomfru and a maid.

The building was destroyed in the Copenhagen Fire of 1795, together with most of the other properties in the area.

=== 19th century ===
The present building on the site was constructed in 1800–01 by master builder and architect Johan Christopher Suhr (1736–1801). No residents were recorded at the time of the 1801 census, indicating that it had not yet been completed by the time that the census took place.

The property was listed as No. 8 in the new cadastre of 1806. It was at that time owned by Otto Diderich Lütken Agerbech (1747–1806). He was alderman of the Pilots' Guild in Copenhagen. Prior to that he had served as captain in the service of the Danish Asiatic Company.On 30 September 1798, he had married Johanne Brache Schumacher. In 1801–03, he had captained Kongens ad Danmark on an expedition to Canton.

=== Seith family ===
At the time of the 1840 census, No. 8 was home to 28 residents in five households. Knud Nielsen Seith, a wholesale merchant (høker en gros), resided on the ground floor and in the basement with his wife Johanne Marie Seith (née Olsen), their 19-year-old son Niels Knudsen Seith, the daughter's one-year-old son Carl Knud Lund, a maid and a wet nurse. Elise Dorthea Olsen (née Balle, 1775–1853), widow of former theatre director Gottsche Hans Olsen (1760-1829), resided on the first floor with her 29-year-old daughter Vilhelmine Charlotte Elin Olsen, the 10-year-old girl Anne Margrethe Naja Hansen, one maid and three lodgers. Louise Auguste Charlotte Benzen, widow of a kanvelliråd, resided on the second floor with a maid and two lodgers. Hans Jacob Søbøtker, a retired naval officer with rank of captain lieutenant, resided on the third floor with two maids. Jens Larsen, a beer seller, resided in the basement with his wife Ellen Chatrine Kiøbenhavn, their two children (aged 13 and 15) and one maid.

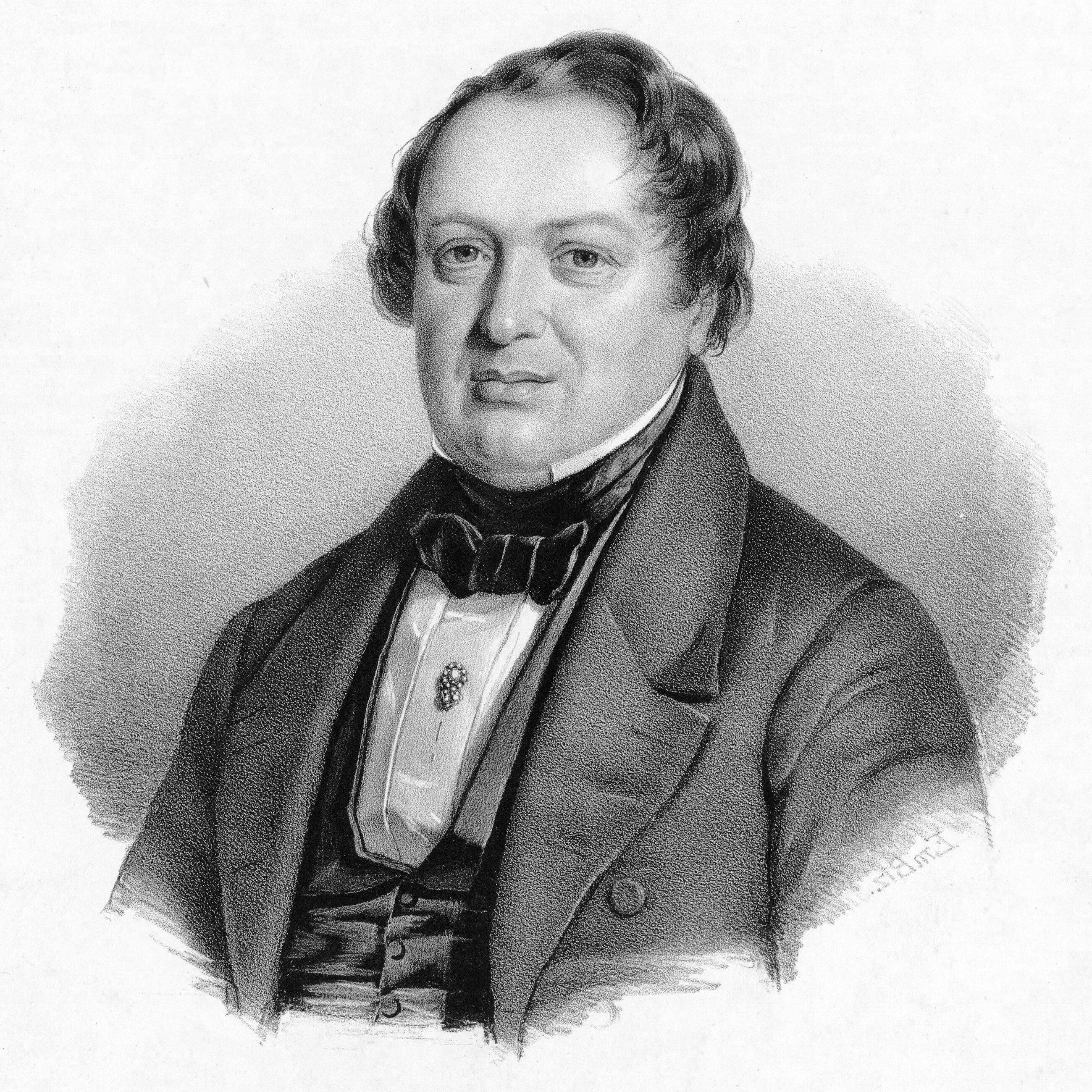
Franz Glaeser by Emil Bærentzen

At the time of the 1845 census, No. 8 was home to 24 residents. Johanne Maria Seith (nnée Olsen), now 60 years old and a widow, resided on the ground floor with the son Niels Leith, her six-year-old grandson Carl Knud Lund and one maid. Anders Hansen Seith, another son and the operator of a grocery shop (høker) in the basement, resided in the associated dwelling with his wife Karen Seith, their one-year-old daughter and one maid. Franz Glaeser (1798–1861), leader of the Royal Danish Orchestra, resided on the first floor with his three children (aged nine to 14), a housekeeper (husjomfru) and a maid. Franz Christian Hagler, a captain in the Royal Danish Artillery Brigade, resided on the second floor with his wife Ernestine Fredderikke (née Ma??) and one maid. Julie Wilhelmine Thielsen, a widow, resided on the third floor with two of her children (aged 23 and 31), three lodgers and one maid.

Johanne Marie Seith was five years later still residing on the ground flor of the building with her son and grandson. Anders and Karen Seith, now with three children (aged one to five), was also still residing in the basement. Glæser was still residing on the first floor. Christian Ditlev Michaelsen (1784-1863), a retired general war commissioner, resided in one of the apartments with his wife Anne Fredericke (née Fanøe) and one maid. Frederik Christian Feveile (1812-1888), a military chief physician, resided on the second floor with his wife Louise Elisabeth Augusta Feveile, their two daughters (aged one and three) and two maids.

Glæser moved to an apartment on Hauser Plads in 1852. J. Gram (1816–1871), professor of law at the University of Copenhagen, was a resident in the building in 1853–54.

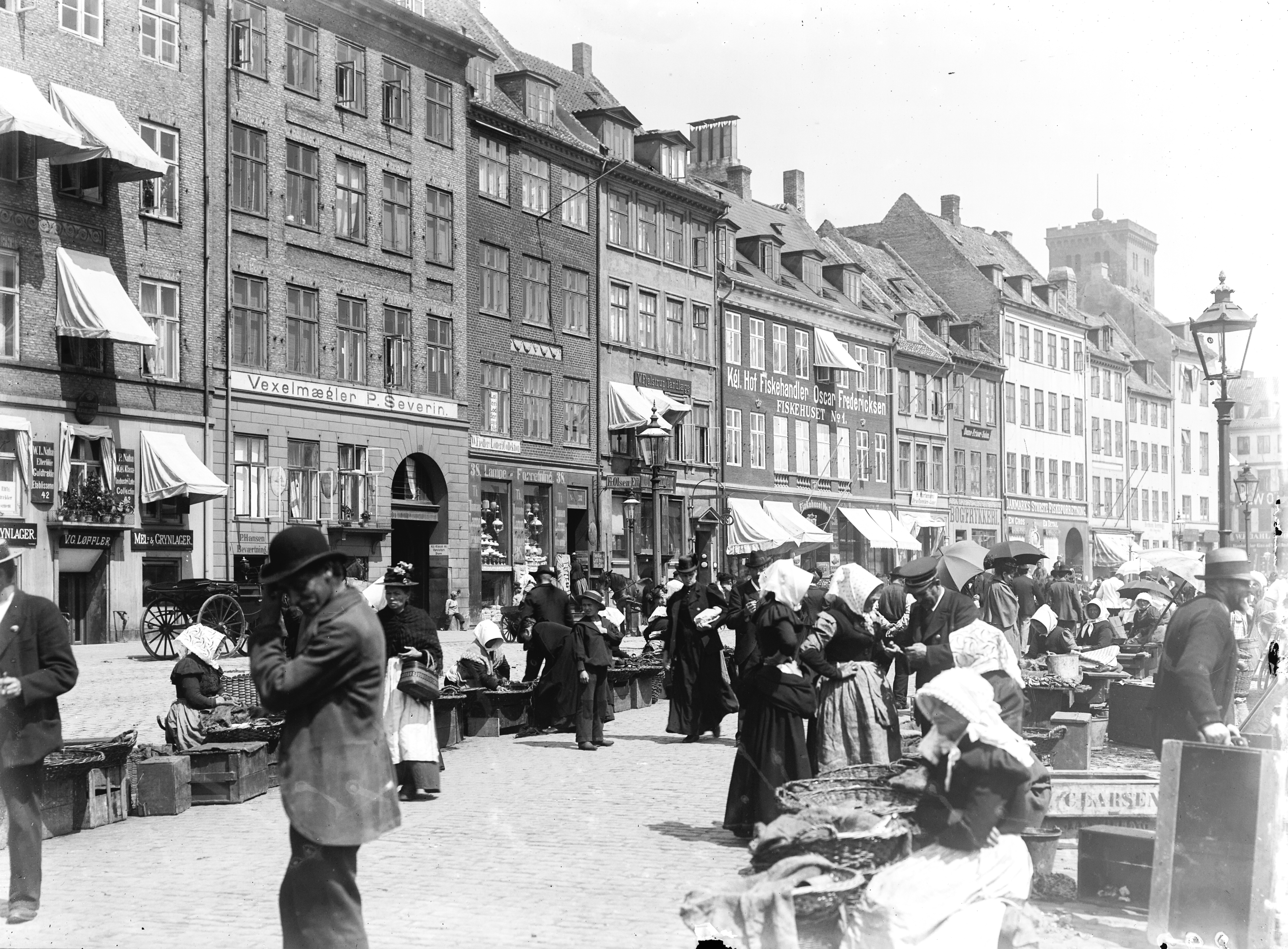
The property seen ob photograph by Frederik Riise from c. 1900.

At the time of the 1860 census, No. 8 was home to 24 residents. Niels Licth and Lodovicka Juliette Christiane (née Holst) resided with their two children (aged two and three) and two maids on the ground floor. Karen Seith, who had now become a widow, resided in the basement with her five children (aged six to 15), a housekeeper (husjomfru) and one maid. Carl Ferdinand Krog (1776-1860). a military officer with rank of mahjor general, resided on the first floor with his wife Catrine Sophia (née Schiøth), two of their daughters (aged 34 and 51) and one maid. Magdalene Cathrine Engelbrecht, a 70-year-old widow, resided on the second floor with one maid. Christian Detlev Michaelsen was still residing on the third floor with his wife and one maid.

== Architecture ==
Gammel Strand 36 is constructed with four storeys over a walk-out basement and is four bays wide. The door in the bay furthest to the right is topped by a triangular pediment. A basement entrance is located in the second bay from the left. The facade is finished by a dentilated cornice. A plaster frieze between the windows on the first and second floor and a band of masonry band between the second and third floors were removed when the facade was first oil painted in 1849.

A three-bay side wing projects from the rear side the building and connects to a one-bay rear wing. The building was listed in the Danish registry of protected buildings and places in 1945.
