= List of county governors of Møre og Romsdal =

The county governor of Møre og Romsdal county in Norway represents the central government administration in the county. The office of county governor is a government agency of the Kingdom of Norway; the title was Amtmann (before 1919), then Fylkesmann (from 1919 to 2020), and then Statsforvaltaren (since 2021).

Romsdalens amt (with its current borders) was established in 1671, but after just four years (in 1675) it was divided into two amts (counties): Romsdal (which included Nordmøre) and Sunnmøre (which included Nordfjord). In 1680 (only 5 years later), Sunnmøre (including Nordfjord) was merged into Bergenhus amt. Then in 1689 (another 9 years later), the three regions of Romsdal, Sunnmøre and Nordmøre were again merged into one amt/county: Romsdalen. Then in 1701 (another 11 years later) Romsdalen amt was split and divided between Trondhjems amt (which got Romsdal and Nordmøre) and Bergenhus amt (which got Sunnmøre). In 1704 (a mere 4 years later), the three regions of Romsdal, Sunnmøre and Nordmøre were again merged into one county. The borders of the county have not been changed much since 1704. The annex parish of Vinje within the larger Hemne parish was transferred from Romsdalens amt to Søndre Trondhjems amt in 1838 (according to the 1838 Formannskapsdistrikt law, a parish could no longer be divided between two counties, so Vinje had to be in the same county as the rest of the parish). In 1919, the name of the county was changed to Møre fylke. In 1936, the name was again changed to Møre og Romsdal fylke.

The county governor is the government's representative in the county. The governor carries out the resolutions and guidelines of the Storting and Government. This is done first by the county governor performing administrative tasks on behalf of the ministries. Secondly, the county governor also monitors the activities of the municipalities and is the appeal body for many types of municipal decisions.

== Name ==
The word for county (amt or fylke) has changed over time. From 1671 until 1918 the title was Amtmann i Romsdalens amt. From 1 January 1919 until 1 January 1936, the title was Fylkesmann i Møre. On 1 January 1936, the title was changed to Fylkesmann i Møre og Romsdal. On 1 January 2021, the title was again changed to the gender-neutral Statsforvaltaren i Møre og Romsdal.

== List of county governors ==
Møre og Romsdal county has had the following governors:

County governors of Møre og Romsdal
Start	End	Name
1671	1675	Christian Lindenow (1632–1675)
1675	1677	Fredrik von Offenberg (1610–1677)
1680	1681	Daniel Knoff (1614–1687)
1681	1691	Jonas Lilienskiold (1651–1691)
1691	1700	Iver von Ahnen (1657–1722)
1702	1703	Hans Lilienskiold (1650–1703)
1704	1719	Hans Hanssen Nobel (1657–1732)
1719	1729	Erik Must (1683–1729)
1729	1730	Michael Worm (1707–17??)
1730	1742	Christian Sørensen Solgaard (1687–1742)
1742	1751	Christian Ulrik Tønder (1699–1751)
1751	1760	Andreas Fieldsted (1717–1788)
1760	1773	Niels Krog Collin (1718–1782)
1773	1800	Even Hammer (1732–1800)
1800	1811	Ole Hannibal Sommerfeldt (1753–1821)
1811	1840	Hilmar Meincke Krohg (1776–1851)
1840	1853	Gudbrand Thesen (1792–1866)
1853	1893	Nils Weyer Arveschoug (1807–1894)
1893	1902	Ludvig Arnoldus Leth (1836–1902)
1902	1906	Alexander Lange Kielland (1849–1906)
1906	1913	Birger Kildal (1849–1913)
1914	1928	Oddmund Vik (1858–1930)
1928	1952	Trygve Utheim (1884–1952)
1941	1945	Erling Kvadsheim (1885–1958) (WWII Occupied government)
1952	1958	Olav Berntsen Oksvik (1887–1958)
1958	1966	Erling Anger (1909–1999)
1966	1972	Erling Sandene (1921–2015)
1972	1977	Kåre Ellingsgård (1926–2017)
1977	1 Jan 2002	Alv Jakob Fostervoll (1932–2015)
1 Jan 2002	1 Oct 2009	Ottar Befring (1939–2023)
1 Oct 2009	31 Dec 2018	Lodve Solholm (born 1949)
1 Jan 2019	30 Sept 2021	Rigmor Brøste (born 1965); Acting governor for Botten.
1 Jan 2019	present	Else-May Norderhus (born 1973); Did not take office until 2021 after finishing her Parliamentary term.
