= Lodve Solholm =

Norwegian politician

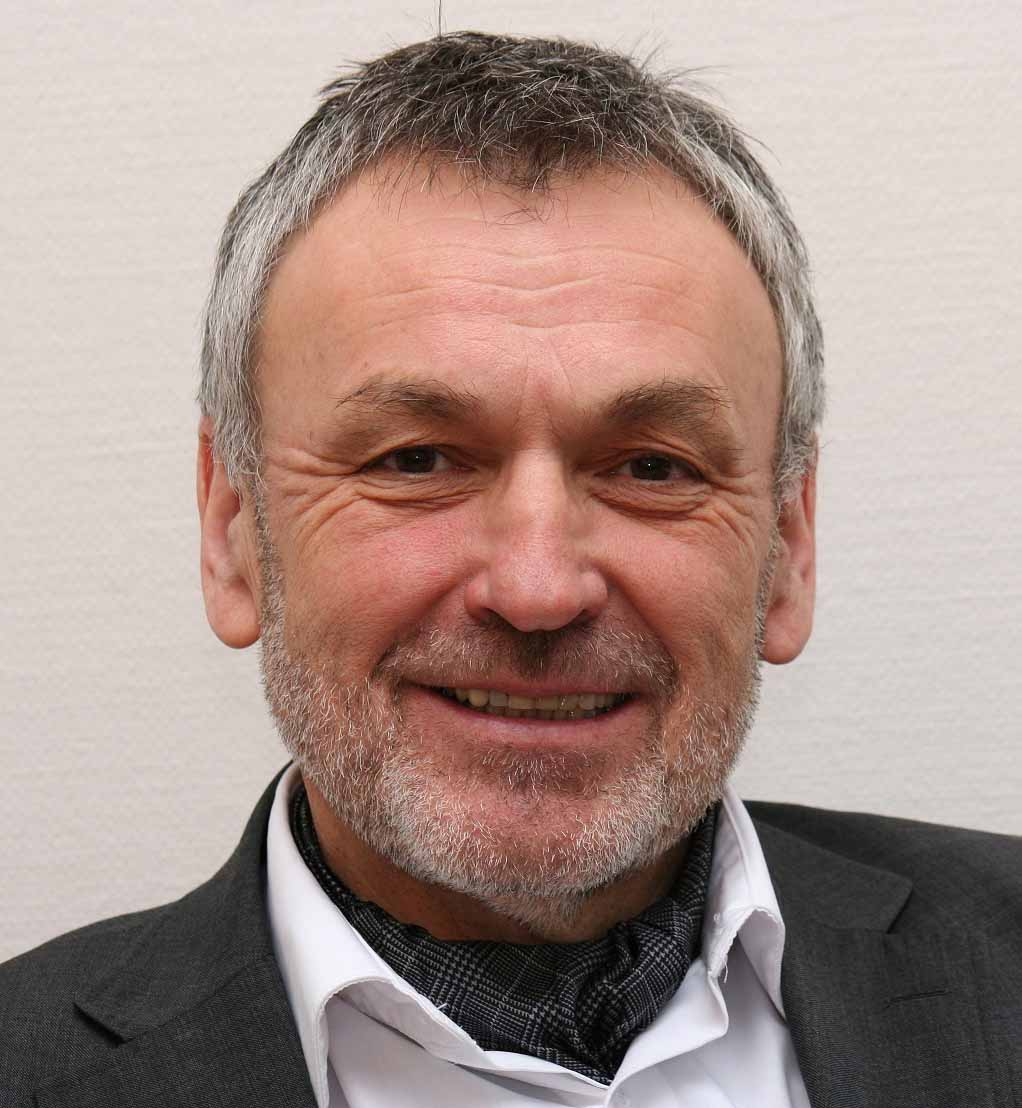
- Solholm’s Governor portrait

Governor of Møre og Romsdal
- In office 1 October 2009 – 31 December 2018
- Prime Minister: Jens Stoltenberg; Erna Solberg
- Preceded by: Ottar Befring
- Succeeded by: Else-May Botten

Member of the Norwegian Parliament
- In office 1 October 1997 – 30 September 2009
- Constituency: Møre og Romsdal
- In office 1 October 1989 – 30 September 1993
- Constituency: Møre og Romsdal

President of the Lagting
- In office 9 October 2001 – 30 September 2005
- Vice President: Odd Holten
- Preceded by: Odd Holten
- Succeeded by: Inge Lønning

Deputy Mayor of Ålesund Municipality
- In office 1 January 2007 – 30 September 2009
- Preceded by: Knut Fylling
- Succeeded by: Geir Stenseth

First Deputy Leader of the Progress Party
- In office 16 April 1994 – 2 May 1999
- Leader: Carl I. Hagen
- Preceded by: Ellen Wibe
- Succeeded by: Siv Jensen

Personal details
- Born: 14 March 1949 (age 77) Vestnes Municipality, Norway
- Party: Progress Party

Lodve Solholm (born 14 March 1949 in Vestnes) was the county governor of Møre og Romsdal (from 2009 until retirement in 2018). He used to be a politician representing the Progress Party.

He was elected to the Norwegian Parliament from Møre og Romsdal in 1989, serving until 1993; he was out of parliament from 1993 to 1997, but was re-elected in 1997, 2001, and 2005. He was President of the Lagting, 2001–2005.

He held various positions in the municipal council of Ørskog Municipality from 1977 to 1989, and was also a member of municipal council of Ålesund Municipality from 1999 to 2007. From 1979 to 1990 he was also a member of Møre og Romsdal county council.

Government offices
Preceded by Ottar Befring	County Governor of Møre og Romsdal; 2009–2018	Succeeded by Rigmor Brøste (acting for Else-May Botten)
