= Rigmor Brøste =

Norwegian politician

Rigmor Brøste (born 1965) is a Norwegian politician and civil servant. She is the acting County Governor of Møre og Romsdal.

Brøste received her cand.mag. degree from the University of Oslo. She worked in municipal government from 1999 to 2006 for Molde Municipality and from 2006 to 2012 for Nesset Municipality. Since 2012, she has worked as an assistant county governor for Møre og Romsdal county. In 2018, the Governor Lodve Solholm retired and the government of Norway appointed Else-May Botten as the new governor, but since she is currently serving in the Parliament of Norway, she cannot take office as the next governor until 2021 when she leaves the Parliament. The government then appointed Brøste as the acting governor to act until Botten can take office.

Government offices
| Preceded by Lodve Solholm | Acting County Governor of Møre og Romsdal; 2019–present | Succeeded by Else-May Botten |
