= Kåre Ellingsgård =

Norwegian civil servant and politician

Kåre Ellingsgård (1 December 1926 – 26 June 2017) was a Norwegian civil servant and politician for the Labour Party.

He was born in Måsøy Municipality in Finnmark, Norway. He took his cand.oecon. degree in 1950, and started a career in the Møre og Romsdal County Municipality roads administration. From 1966 he was the chief financial officer of Møre og Romsdal Fylkesbåtar, and he was then chief executive officer from 1968 to 1973.

Ellingsgård served as a member of the city council for Molde Municipality from 1950 and onwards. In 1971 he took a short leave to serve as State Secretary in the Ministry of Transport. In 1973 he left elected politics to serve as County Governor of Møre og Romsdal. He continued on to the position as chief administrative officer of Møre og Romsdal County Municipality from 1976 to 1988.

Government offices
Preceded by Erling Sandene	County Governor of Møre og Romsdal; 1972–1977	Succeeded by Alv Jakob Fostervoll
