= Else-May Botten =

Norwegian politician

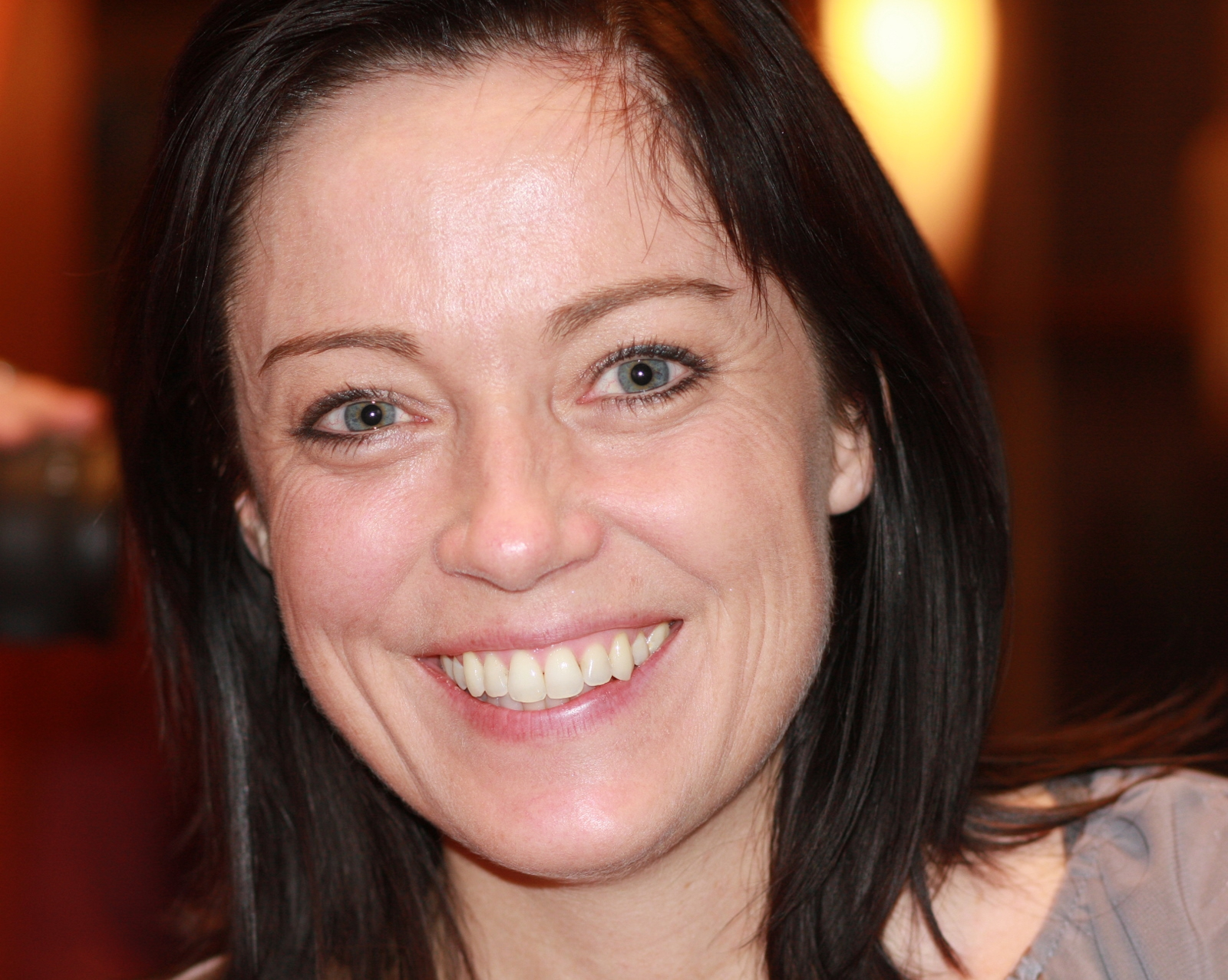
- Botten in 2010

County Governor of Møre og Romsdal
- Incumbent
- Assumed office 1 October 2021
- Monarchs: Harald V Haakon VIII
- Prime Minister: Erna Solberg; Jonas Gahr Støre
- Preceded by: Rigmor Brøste

Member of the Norwegian Parliament for Møre og Romsdal
- In office 2009–2021

Personal details
- Born: 16 August 1973 (age 53) Halsa Municipality, Norway
- Citizenship: Norway
- Party: Labour Party
- Parents: Kolbjørn Botten (father); Norveig Botten (mother)
- Profession: Politician

Else-May Botten (born 16 August 1973, in Halsa Municipality) is a Norwegian politician for the Norwegian Labour Party. She was elected to the Storting from Møre og Romsdal county in 2009. She was deputy representative 2005–2009. In 2009, she was Møre og Romsdal Labour Party's 1st candidate to the Storting, and was elected as a representative. She was re-elected in 2013 and 2017.

Botten has a background as secretary of the Norwegian Confederation of Trade Unions in the county since 1995. She was a member of the county council in Møre og Romsdal from 2003 to 2007. Botten grew up in Halsa Municipality in Nordmøre, and now lives in Molde Municipality in Romsdal.

On 26 October 2018, Botten was appointed by the Storting to be the new County Governor (fylkesmann) of Møre og Romsdal county. Since she is currently a member of the Storting until 2021, she will not take office until her Parliamentary term is up in October 2021. From 2019 until 2021, Rigmor Brøste was appointed as the temporary acting governor.

Government offices
Preceded by Rigmor Brøste (acting)	County Governor of Møre og Romsdal starting in 2021	Incumbent
