= Peter Schnitler =

Danish/Norwegian jurist and military officer

Peter Schnitler (17 January 1690 – 23 January 1751) was a Danish/Norwegian jurist and military officer. He was born in Copenhagen, and was a nephew of landowner and civil servant Hans Nobel. He is particularly remembered for his work with the Norwegian/Swedish Border Commission in the 1740s. He died in Trondheim in 1751.

His protocols were published in three volumes, in 1929, 1962 and 1985, as Major Peter Schnitlers grenseeksaminasjonsprotokoller 1742–1745.
