= Franz Joseph Glæser =

Austrian-Danish composer (1798–1861)

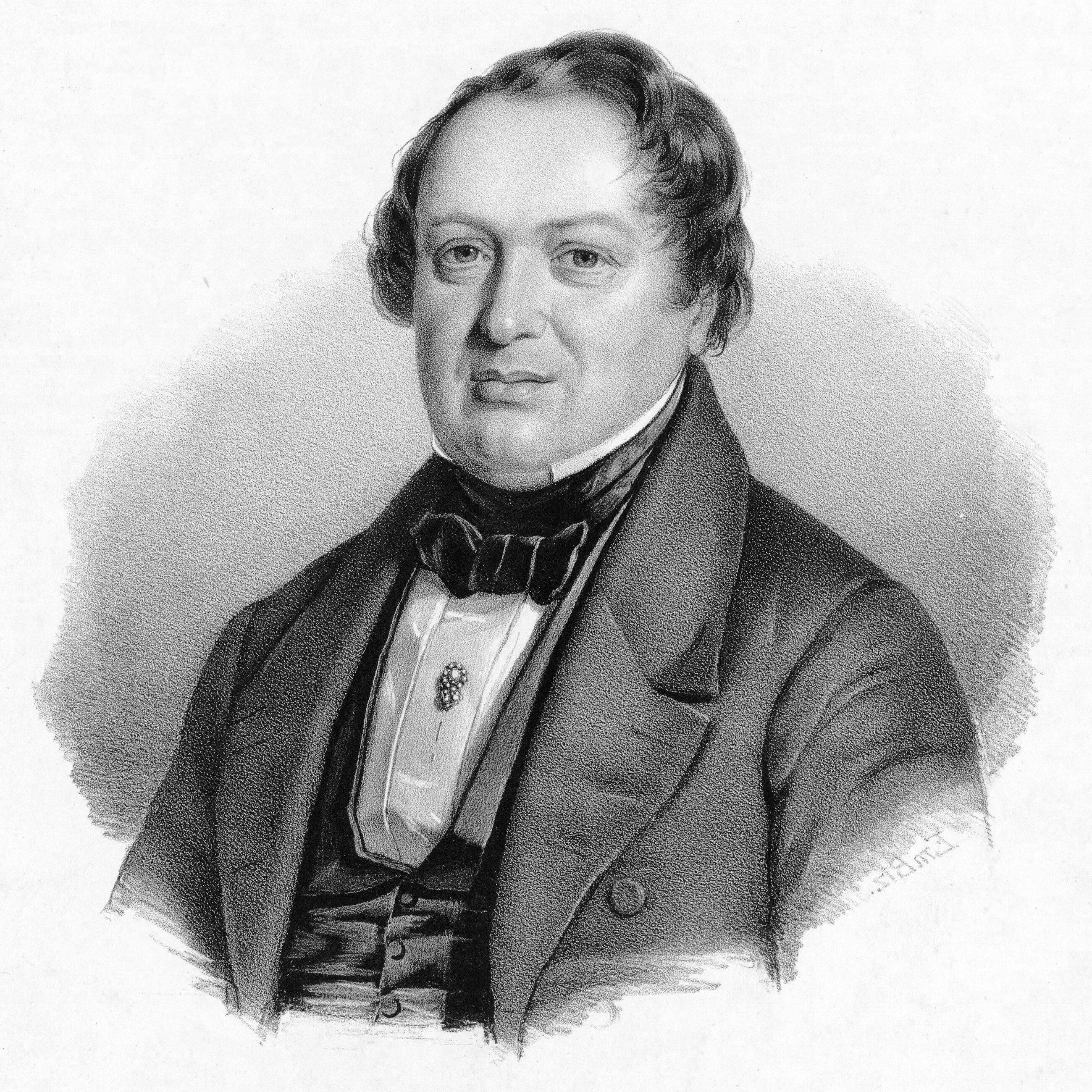
Franz Glaeser by Emil Bærentzen

Franz Joseph Glæser (19 April 1798 - 29 August 1861), also spelt as Glaeser and Gläser, was an Austrian-Danish composer.

Born in Obergeorgenthal, Bohemia, then part of the Austrian Empire, Glaeser’s work as a composer was mostly done before he migrated to Denmark, to spend much of his later life in Copenhagen. He gained his first position as a Kapellmeister at the Leopoldstadt Theater in 1817 and his last at Copenhagen in 1842, retaining the position until his death in 1861.

== Work ==
- Die vier Haimonskinder (1809)
- Bärnburgs Sturz (1817)
- Das Mädchen ohne Zunge (1819)
- Das Felsenmädchen (1820)
- Der geraubte Schleier (1820)
- Der Tambour (1820)
- Sküs, Mond und Pagat (1820)
- Wenn's was ist, so ist's nichts und ist's nichts, so sind's 36 Kreuzer (1820)
- Arsenius der Weiberfeind (1823)
- Dank und Undank (1823)
- Der rasende Roland (1823)
- Stumme Liebe (1823)
- Der Brief an sich selbst (1824)
- Der Erlenkönig (1824)
- Die kurzen Mäntel (1824)
- Die Rettung durch die Sparkassa (1824)
- Liebe und Haß (1824)
- Sauertöpfchen (1824)
- Sieben Mädchen in Uniform (1825)
- Der Bär und das Kind (1825)
- Die sonderbare Laune (1825)
- Die Weiber in Uniform (1825)
- Die Zauberin Armida (1825)
- Heliodor, Beherrscher der Elemente (1825)
- Menagerie und optische Zimmerreise in Krähwinkel (1825)
- Die steinerne Jungfrau (1826)
- Oberon, König der Elfen (1827)
- Peterl und Paulerl (1827)
- Abu, der schwarze Wundermann (1828)
- Armida, die Zauberin im Orient (1825)
- Elsbeth (1828)
- Meister Pilgram, Erbauer des Stephansturmes in Wien (1828)
- Peter Stiglitz
- Staberl
- Die steinerne Jungfrau
- Der Rattenfänger von Hameln
- Aurora (c.1830 Berlin)
- Die Brautschau auf Kronstein (1830, Berlín)
- Andrea (1830 Berlín)
- Des Adlers Horst (29.12.1832, Berlín)
- Die Augen des Teufels
- Bryllupet vet Como-søen (29.1.1849, Kodaň)
- Nøkken (12.2.1853, Kodaň)
- Den forgyldte svane (17.3.1854, Kodaň)

== See also ==
- List of Danish composers
