= Norwegian church sale =

1720s sale of most churches in Norway

The Norwegian church sale (Norwegian: kirkesalget) was a comprehensive, systematic sale of most of the church properties in Norway during the 1720s with the intention of improving the poor state of the Kingdom of Denmark-Norway's finances after the Great Northern War. In 1721, the government to sell the churches in Norway and the property they owned, with some exceptions. This event is often referred to as "the great church sale" (Norwegian: det store kirkesalget). It was mainly carried out in the years 1723 to 1730. A total of 632 churches and annex chapels, with all their associated church estates, were sold. About a hundred were sold to the congregations and the rest individuals, often clergymen such as bishops and priests. Later, most churches were bought back by the congregation, often with help from the municipality. In retrospect, the King's ownership and right to sell these properties has been questioned. On the other hand, it can be considered a taxation of the rich in society - as it was they who often bought these properties in auctions.

== History ==
The sale was announced by posters hung on churches on 1 August 1721. As early as 1710, King Frederick IV had decided to sell the Norwegian churches, but this was not done at that time. When the sale was decided in 1721, the city churches, the churches in northern Norway, and the churches that were lent to the counties of Jarlsberg and Larvik, as well as the Barony Rosendal were excluded. Also, there was no sale of churches and properties in Northern Østerdal.

The Bishop of Christiania Bartholomæus Deichman was initially given the main responsibility for the sale. In 1722, he was replaced by the official Hans Nobel. In the first round, the bids were so low that they were not accepted. Nobel eventually managed to sell about half of the churches, mostly those that had profitable land attached to them. Interest in the sale increased when the government clarified that the new church owners could collect the tithe from the congregation directly. The first sale was completed on 3 May 1723. The bulk of the sale was completed by 1726, and the last set of churches were sold by 1730.

About two-thirds of those who bought the churches were government officials and of these, bishops and priests bought most churches. About a quarter of the churches were sold to farmers, either alone or several farmers together. About a tenth of the churches were sold to city dwellers. If the buyer had money owed to them by the Treasury, this was deducted from the purchase price. Since the Kingdom was not great at paying its debts during this period, it was often desirable for those people to buy churches as a way of ensuring that they could claim the money owed to them by the government.

The buyers took over all the wealth and debt of each church. The estates that came with the churches were largely left to their tenant farmers, who had to pay land debts to the church. The estate could not be sold and separated from the church. The church owner was thus entitled to taxes from those who used the church land. This could be very lucrative, but at the same time the church owner was also responsible for ensuring that the church was properly maintained, and they also had to supply the church with bread and wine for communion and other necessities. Much of this was financed through tithes and fees that the church owner could collect from the homeowners within the parish. The state retained the right to call priests for each parish, so the new church owners could not hire priests themselves.

In total, the government took in around 210,000 rigsdaler from the sale, which equates to approximately 1.5 billion kr in today's money value.
