= Holtermann =

Holtermann is a surname. Notable people with the surname include:

- Bernhardt Holtermann (1838–1885), German gold miner in Australia
- Hans Reidar Holtermann (1895–1966), Norwegian army officer
- Henrik Holtermann (born 1997), Danish curler
- Karl Höltermann (1894–1955), German politician
- Ove Bjelke Holtermann (1852–1936), Norwegian architect, uncle of Hans Reidar
- Peter Høier Holtermann (1820–1865), Norwegian architect, uncle of Ove Bjelke and granduncle of Hans Reidar
