= Anne Margrethe Strømsheim =

Member of the Norwegian resistance

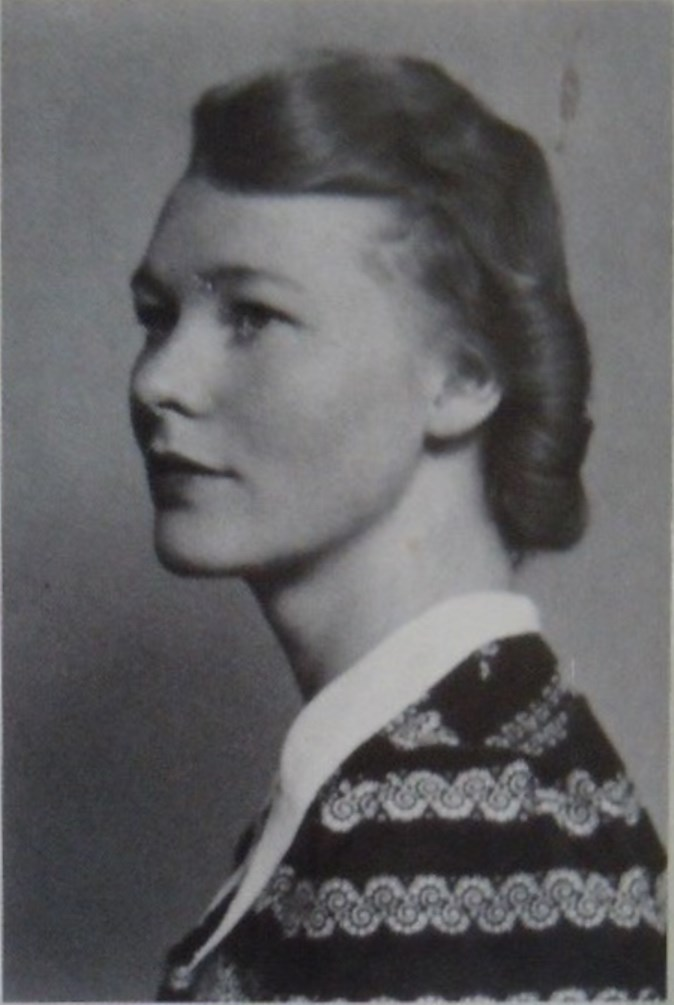
- Born: Anne Margrethe Bang; 1914; Trondheim, Norway
- Died: 6 October 2008 (aged 93–94); Bærum, Norway
- Relatives: Joakim Sveder Bang (father)
- Military career
- Allegiance: Norway
- Branch: Norwegian Army
- Service years: 1940–1945
- Nickname: Lotten fra Hegra (English: The women's defence league volunteer from Hegra)
- Units: • Hegra Fortress • Norwegian resistance movement
- Conflicts: World War II: Battle of Hegra Fortress; Resistance to the occupation of Norway
- Awards: (Norway) Norwegian War Medal (Norway) Defence Medal 1940–1945 (Norway) HM The King's Medal of Merit
- Other work: Social worker

Anne Margrethe Strømsheim (née Bang; 1914 – 6 October 2008) was a Norwegian resistance member during the German occupation of Norway during World War II. She is best known for her participation in the defence of Hegra Fortress in 1940 and her post-World War II war information work.

== Early life ==
Anne Margrethe Bang was born in Trondheim in 1914, the daughter of a medical doctor. Her father Joakim Sveder Bang, a surgeon, served as an inspiration for her. He had taken part in World War I and the Balkan Wars as a medical volunteer and was convinced that sooner or later the Germans or Russians would attack Norway. From the age of 11 Anne Margrethe was taught by her father how to disinfect medical equipment and perform first aid. Although she wanted to become a professional nurse when World War II was over, she lacked money to fund any education.

== World War II ==
During the Norwegian Campaign she took part in the Battle of Hegra Fortress as a nurse. The battle saw a small force of Norwegian volunteers holding back German forces for 25 days, with Hegra Fortress eventually capitulating on 5 May — after all other Norwegian forces in southern Norway had laid down their arms. The only woman at Hegra, Bang became known nationally as a resistance heroine and was given the nickname Lotten fra Hegra.

=== Outbreak of war ===
At the outbreak of the German invasion on 9 April 1940 she was at Kongsvoll mountain station recovering from bronchitis. As the news reached her she put on her skis and started off for Trondheim, catching a lift with a freight train to Oppdal Municipality. From Oppdal she took a taxicab to Trondheim, arriving late in the evening of 9 April. After evacuating her mother from Trondheim she returned to the city before moving on Lake Selbusjø where she encountered Norwegian Army Air Service pilots who had evacuated from Værnes. The pilots told her that fighting was expected in the area around Hegra and that the Norwegian forces there were lacking medical supplies. In response to these reports she gathered together medical supplies and went to Hegra. At Hegra, she met two childhood friends who had volunteered to fight the German invasion, both of whom were to die during the upcoming battle. Even before the fighting began she had to use her first aid skills when a civilian train was accidentally fired upon by the Norwegian soldiers blocking the Meråker Line rail line. After the incident, she tended a severely wounded Finnish woman until the woman could be operated on at a hospital in Selbu Municipality, singing a Finnish song to calm her down. On her way back to the fortress Bang had to pass through German road blocks and for the last bit wade through deep snow.

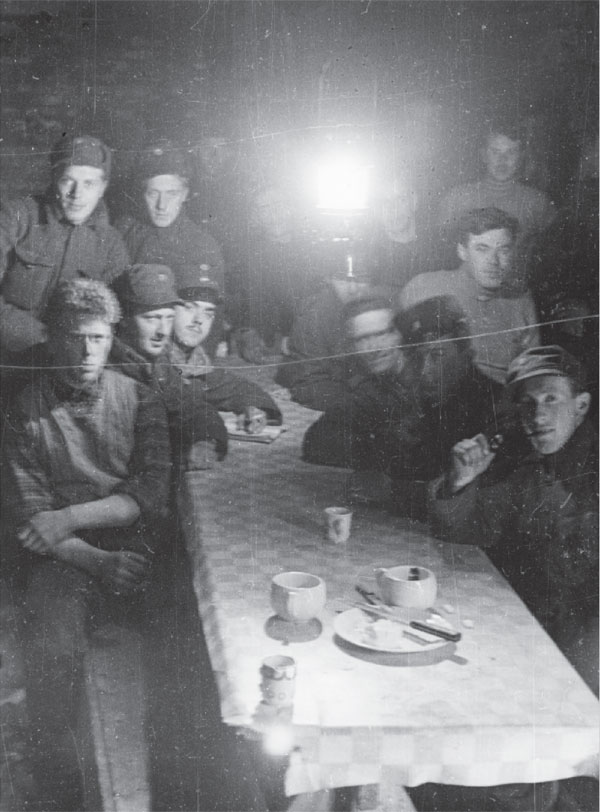
Some of the Norwegian defenders at Hegra gathered in one of the fortress' subterranean halls during the siege.

=== Under siege at Hegra ===
During the 25-day Battle of Hegra Fortress Anne Margrethe Bang tended the sick and wounded for 20 hours a day if there were no German attacks going on; during attacks she would work non-stop. The German besiegers soon noticed her as their observers spotted a person in military uniform but without a cap and with long, blonde hair at the fortress. The Germans took to calling her Jeanne d'Arc. The cold and wet conditions within the fortress led to sickness amongst most of the Norwegian soldiers and Bang herself had to have several toes amputated after the battle.

=== Prisoner of war ===
After Hegra Fortress surrendered on 5 May 1940 Bang was held as a prisoner of war by the Germans, although she was treated much better than her fellow male soldiers who were set to do forced labour. The PoWs from Hegra worked with lumber intended to be used for repairing bridges destroyed by Norwegian forces during the fighting. Only after she managed to contact the Norwegian Red Cross did the PoWs receive medical treatment, with more than 40 men being hospitalised and several dying of tuberculosis.

=== During the German occupation ===
After the end of the 1940 Campaign she continued her fight against the occupiers through participation in the Norwegian resistance movement In the autumn of 1940 Bang was brought in for interrogation by the Gestapo. When she was confronted with her resistance efforts at Hegra she quoted a section of Mein Kampf that states that any country and people that does not intend to defend itself is not worthy of existence and should be exterminated. Continuing her activities in the Norwegian resistance Bang eventually had to flee Trøndelag to avoid arrest, being warned in advance by a local Nazi.

== Honours ==
For her wartime efforts she was decorated with the Norwegian War Medal, the Defence Medal 1940–1945 and the HM The King's Medal of Merit in gold, as well as four others including one American. Initially the Norwegian authorities were hesitant to give her the War Medal due to her gender, but she eventually received it.

On International Women's Day (8 March) 2005 a street in Stjørdal was named Anne Margrethe Bangs gate in honour of the sole female defender of Hegra Fortress. As she was told of the decision to name the street after her she stated that she was glad of the honour, having been fond of the area since an early age.

In 2006 Strømsheim donated her medals to the museum at Hegra Fortress.

== Post-war life ==
After World War II Strømsheim worked for the benefit of blind children, war invalids and divers injured during oil exploration in the North Sea. Strømsheim expressed concern over the young Norwegian people being sent to conflict zones in the 21st century, stating that her own mother had not recognised her after the war. She also expressed grave concerns as to the condition of the Norwegian Defence Force and its ability to defend Norway's oil and energy resources. In addition, she stated that modern Norwegian youths were not given enough information on the realities of war by the government.

In her later years she lived in Bærum Municipality, and died there on 6 October 2008.
