= Treungen Church =

Church in Telemark, Norway

- Treungen kyrkje
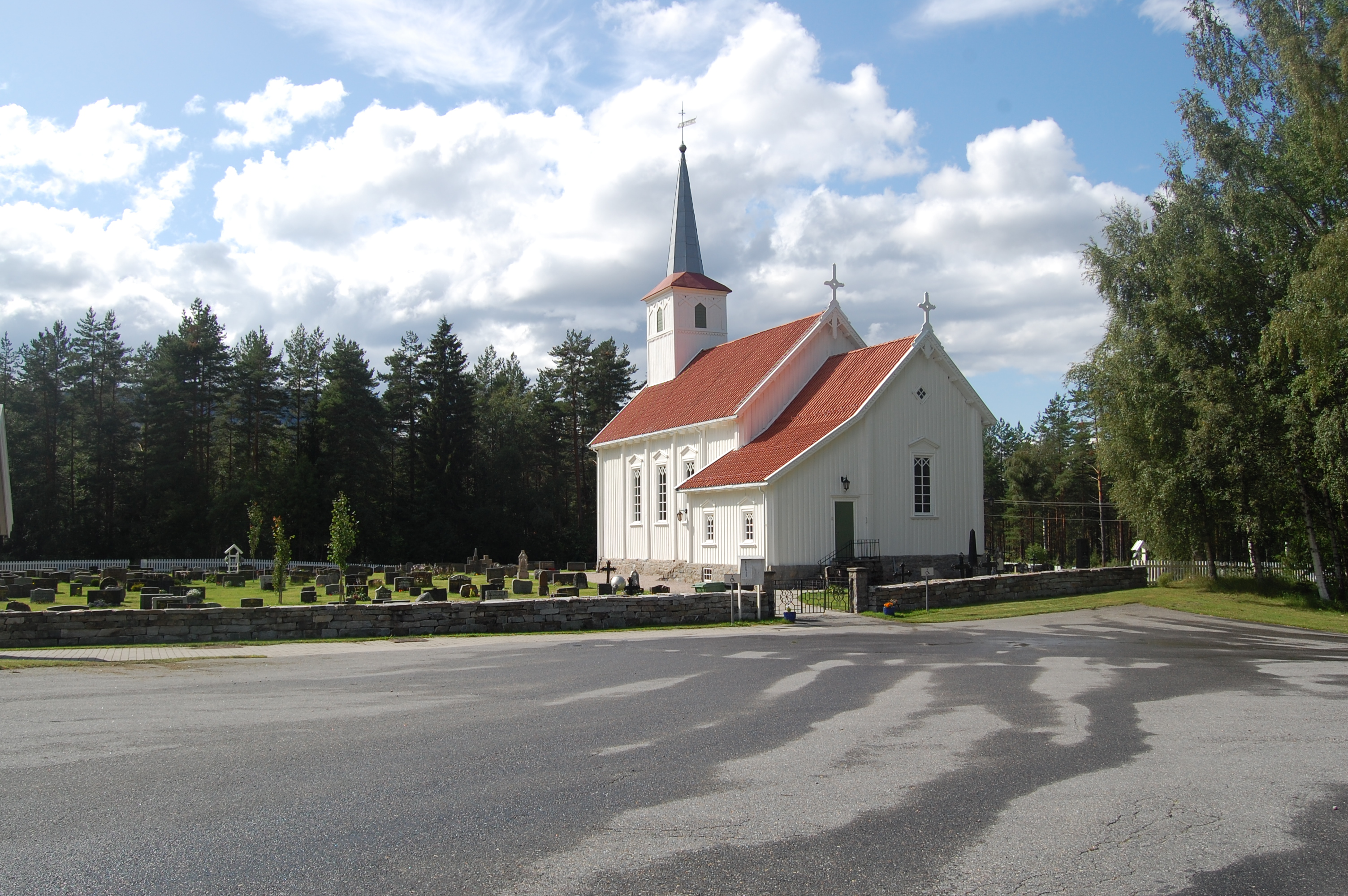
- View of the church
- Treungen Church
- 59°00′28″N 8°33′33″E
- Location: Nissedal Municipality, Telemark
- Country: Norway
- Denomination: Church of Norway
- Previous denomination: Catholic Church
- Churchmanship: Evangelical Lutheran

History
- Status: Parish church
- Founded: 13th century
- Consecrated: 25 March 1863

Architecture
- Functional status: Active
- Architect: Peter Høier Holtermann
- Architectural type: Long church
- Completed: 1863 (163 years ago)

Specifications
- Capacity: 250
- Materials: Wood

Administration
- Diocese: Agder og Telemark
- Deanery: Øvre Telemark prosti
- Parish: Nissedal
- Norwegian Cultural Heritage Site
- Type: Church
- Status: Listed
- ID: 85667

Treungen Church (Norwegian: Treungen kyrkje) is a parish church of the Church of Norway in Nissedal Municipality in Telemark county, Norway. It is located in the village of Treungen. It is one of the churches for the Nissedal parish which is part of the Øvre Telemark prosti (deanery) in the Diocese of Agder og Telemark. The white, wooden church was built in a long church design in 1863 using plans drawn up by the architect Peter Høier Holtermann. The church seats about 250 people.

== History ==
The earliest existing historical records of the church date back to the year 1395, but the church was not built that year. The first church in Treungen was a wooden stave church that was located on the Tveit farm, about 3 kilometres (1.9 mi) to the northwest of the present church site. The church may have been built during the 13th century. The church was in poor condition by the 1700s, and in 1750, the old church was torn down and replaced with a new church on the same site. The new church was consecrated on 24 November 1750.

By 1860, the church had fallen into such disrepair that it was not considered worth the trouble to repair it. Permission was granted to demolish the church and build a new church at Homme, about 3 kilometres (1.9 mi) to the southeast of the old church site as the crow flies. The church was designed by Peter Høier Holtermann and built by builder F. Scheuffert from Tvedestrand. The new church was consecrated on 25 March 1863. After the new church was in use, the old church was demolished. The old cemetery that surrounded the old church is still located on the hillside where the old church used to be. In the 1960s, the church was extensively restored and at the same time, a sacristy was built on the south side of the choir. Also the altar was changed; the church was painted; and the church got new pews, new windows, and a new roof. A storage room for the cemetery was also built in the basement of the church.

== Media gallery ==
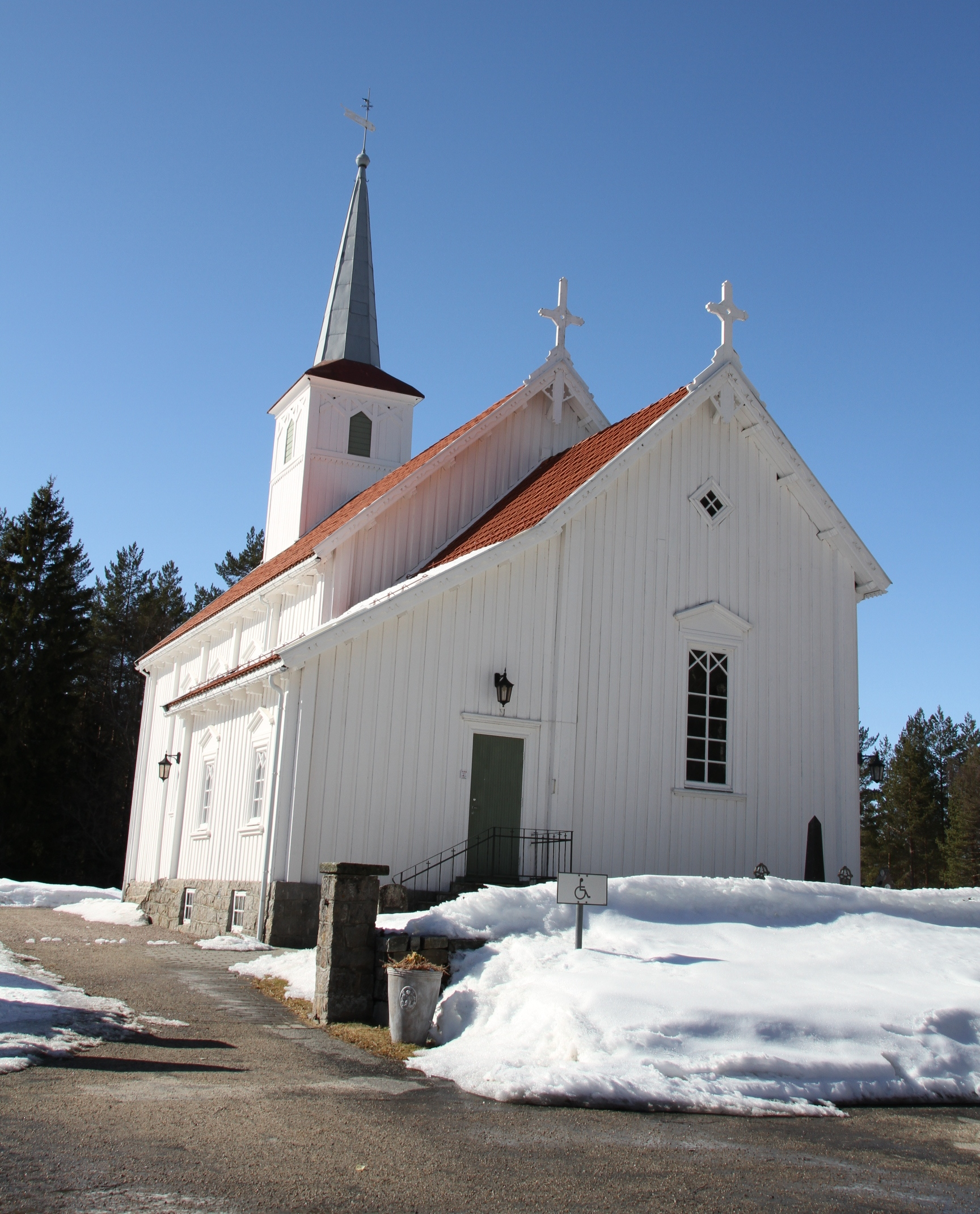

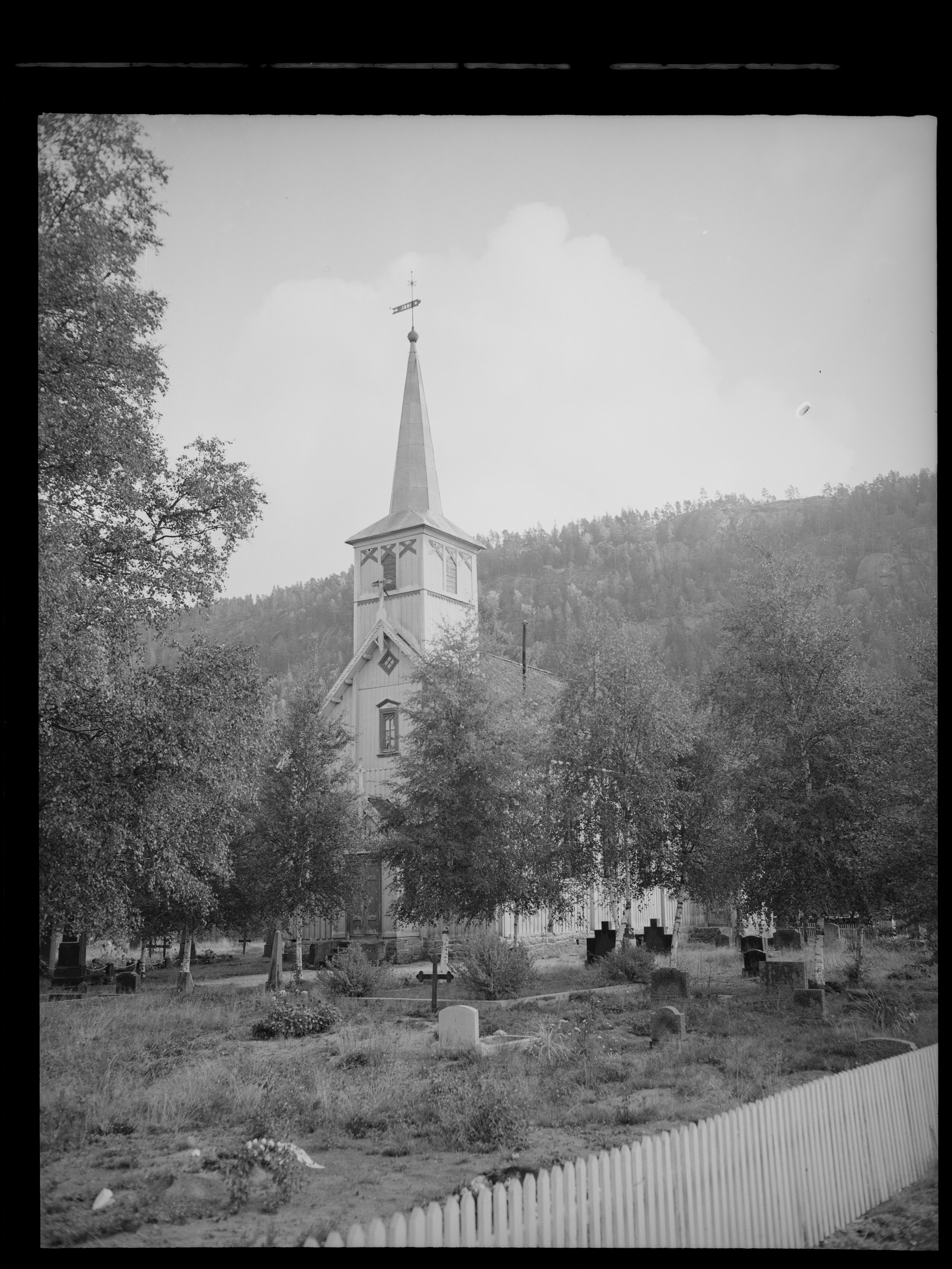

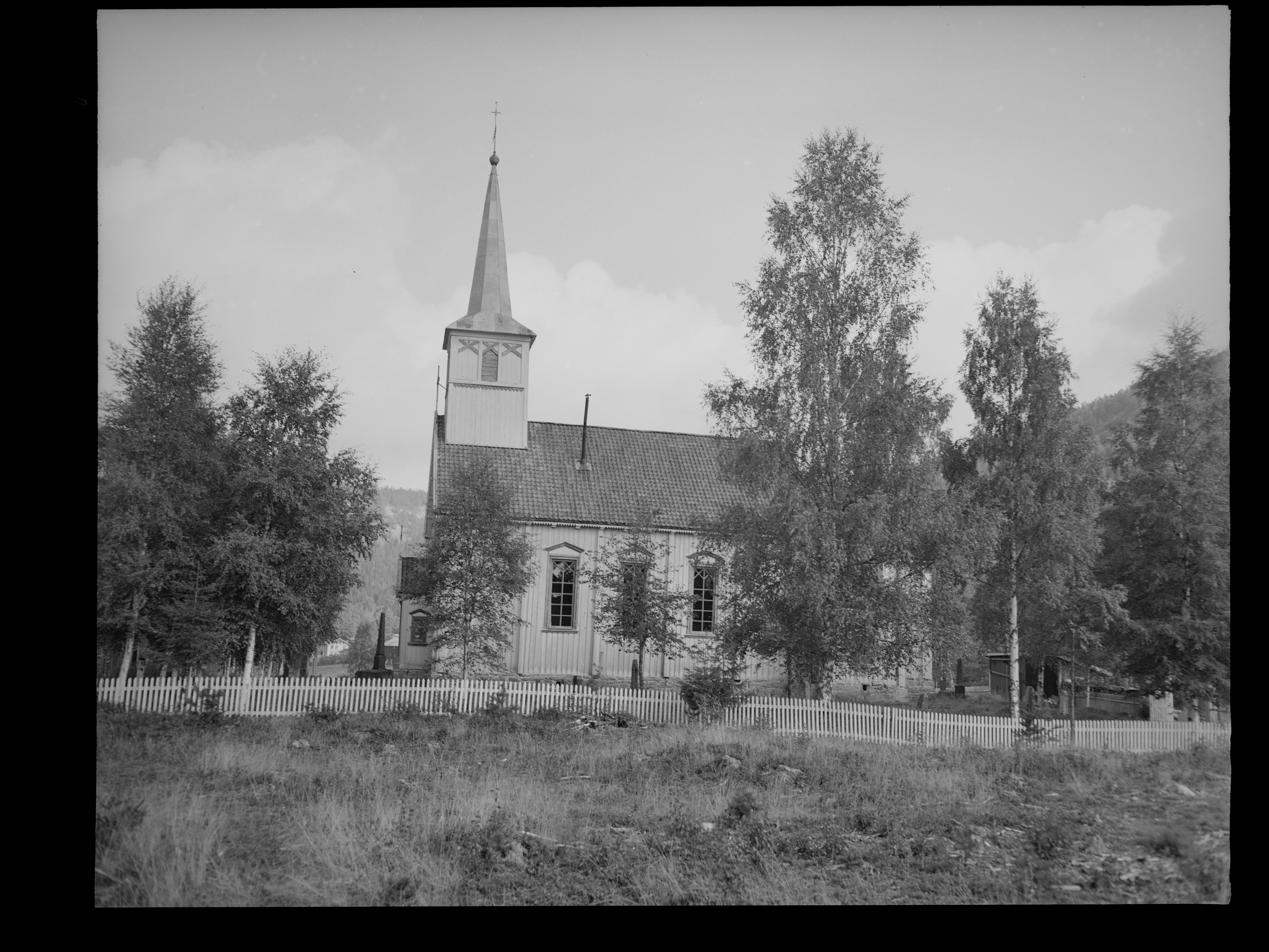

== See also ==
- List of churches in Agder og Telemark
