= Joakim Sveder Bang =

Norwegian physician and politician

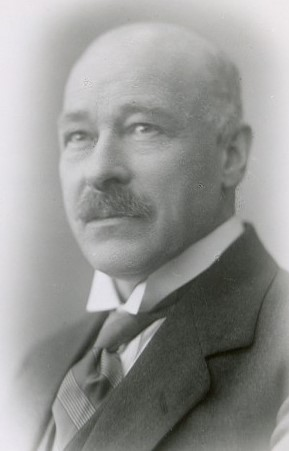
- Born: 15 December 1868; Aarstad Municipality, Norway
- Died: 2 February 1931 (aged 62)
- Occupations: Physician; Politician
- Children: Anne Margrethe Strømsheim

Joakim Sveder Bang (15 December 1868 – 2 February 1931) was a Norwegian physician and politician.

He was born in Aarstad Municipality to engineer Joackim Waldemar Bang and Hanna Hermansen. He graduated as cand.med. in 1894, and further specilazed in surgery. He was also a military officer. He participated with the Red Cross during the Balkan Wars (1912–1913), and in British hospitals during the First World War. He was elected representative to the Storting for the periods 1922–1924 and 1925–1927, for the Free-minded Liberal Party.
