= Battle of Hegra Fortress =

Part of the Norwegian campaign of World War II (April–May 1940)

Coordinates: 63°27′03″N 11°09′47″E

- Part of the Norwegian campaign
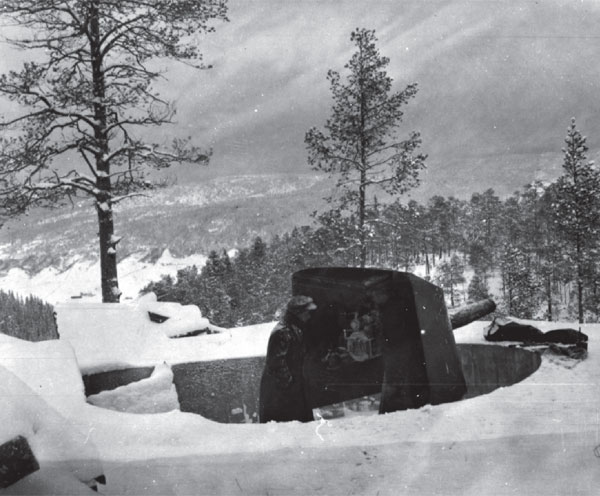
- Norwegian 7.5 cm gun position
Date	15 April – 5 May 1940
Location	Hegra, Norway
Result	German victory Hegra Fortress capitulated 5 May after all other Norwegian forces in southern Norway had laid down their arms.

Belligerents
Norway	Germany

Commanders and leaders
(Norway) Hans Reidar Holtermann (surrendered)	15–20 April: (Nazi Germany) Weiss; 20 April – 5 May: (Nazi Germany) Kurt Woytasch

Units involved
(Norway) A volunteer company of soldiers having served in Artillery Regiment no. 3	(Nazi Germany) 138. Gebirgsjägerregiment (15–27 April) (Nazi Germany) 181. Infantry Division (27 April–5 May)

Strength
Positional artillery: 4×10.5 cm guns 2×7.5 cm guns (under Captain Evjen, with 25 men); Field artillery: 4×8.4 cm guns (under 2nd Lieutenant Reitan, with 10 men); Total force: 250 volunteer soldiers (most of whom had had a short national service with Artillery Regiment no. 3 (AR 3) before the war); 1 female volunteer nurse	1 battalion 1 reinforced infantry company 1 artillery unit (with numerous mortars, cannons and howitzers)

Casualties and losses
6 killed 14 wounded 200+ captured	150–200 killed or wounded 1 captured 1 aircraft destroyed 1 aircraft damaged
- Civilian casualties: One Norwegian civilian killed 2 Finnish civilian refugees wounded

The Battle of Hegra Fortress was a 25-day engagement in the 1940 Norwegian campaign which saw a small force of Norwegian volunteers fighting numerically superior German forces from a fortified position. After initial fighting around the Meråker Line railway line, the Norwegians pulled back into Hegra Fortress and held off further German attacks before surrendering on 5 May as one of the last Norwegian units active in southern Norway.

== Opposing forces ==
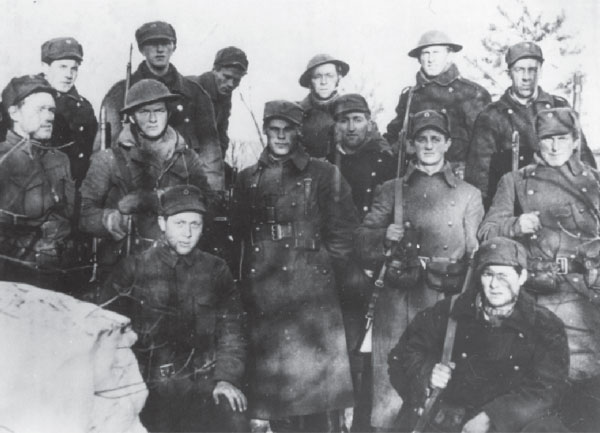
A group of Norwegian soldiers early on during the battle

=== Norwegian force ===
The Norwegian defenders were 250 volunteer soldiers and the volunteer nurse Anne Margrethe Bang. Most of the volunteers that served at Hegra were from the area Hegra/Stjørdal/Trondheim, but they also included three Swedes.

The garrison at Hegra was equipped with small arms (Krag–Jørgensen rifles and carbines), as well as Madsen and Colt M/29 machine guns.

The fortress also had artillery, four 10.5 cm (4.13 in) and two 7.5 cm (2.95 in) positional pieces of reasonably modern make with gun shields; as well as four Krupp m/1887 8.4 cm (3.31 in) field guns. The artillery had a maximum range of between six and nine kilometres.

Many of these men had been mobilized to Artillery Regiment no. 3 at Øyanmoen army camp at Værnes Air Station and were brought to Hegra to continue the mobilization after the Germans had reached their camp. The fortress at Hegra was originally only intended as a temporary refuge for the artillery regiment, but ended up as the centre of the volunteers' war in 1940.

=== German force ===
The attacking force initially consisted of Gebirgsjäger of the German 138. Gebirgsjägerregiment (part of the 3. Gebirgsdivision), which landed in Trondheim on 9 April. Later, from 20 April to 27 April, the Germans substituted the 138. Gebirgsjägerregiment with units from the 181. Infantry Division and the 138. Gebirgsjäger were sent north to try to relieve their comrades at the Narvik Front.

By the end of the battle the German forces employed against Hegra Fortress consisted chiefly of one infantry battalion at Hegra and one company of Gebirgsjäger in the nearby village of Sona. In addition further units were deployed to the village of Elvran and to Selbu Municipality.

== Background ==
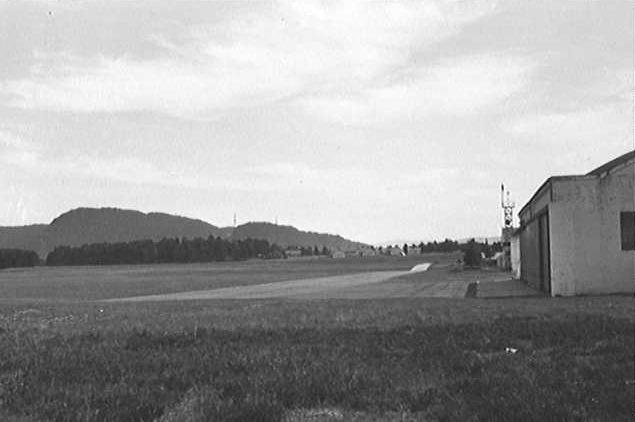
Værnes in 1936

The old mothballed fort at Ingstadkleiva that was to become known as Hegra Fortress was not intended by any of the parties as a battlefield. It only became of importance when the Norwegian artillery major Hans Reidar Holtermann started organising troops to resist the German invasion forces which had been landed at Trondheim. Holtermann first travelled to the army camp at Værnes to mobilize his Artillery Regiment no. 3. This mobilization began at 14:00 on 9 April 1940, but the Germans landed at Stjørdal Station the very next day, and by 10:30 approached the camp. As his forces were not combat ready, Holtermann had to evacuate and move to what was at that point known as Ingstadkleiva Fort to complete his mobilization. Thus, at 15:00 on 10 April 1940, most of the personnel and equipment under Holtermann's command arrived at the small mountain fortification of Ingstadkleiva Fort. At this point, Holtermann was given orders to proceed with the mobilization and otherwise do what he himself thought best. Holtermann thus began to gather and equip a fighting force of local volunteers. After arriving at the fort Holtermann first took residence in the buildings outside the mountain fortifications, not intending to defend the facility, only use it as a temporary base.

=== Mobilization ===
By 10 April, Holtermann already had fifty volunteers under his command and a steady stream of mostly local men kept being drawn to the fort. On 11 April, men of Holtermann's unit returned to Værnes to remove more of the materiel and provisions stored there. Due to poor security amongst the German forces stationed at the camp, the Norwegians were able to carry out their mission undetected. The reclaimed supplies were taken partly to the fortress and partly to a number of nearby farms. When a force of 250 soldiers had been assembled, Holtermann had to turn away further volunteers due to the fact he could not arm or equip any more soldiers than those he already had under his command at that point. From 12 April work was carried out to reactivate the fortress's artillery, which was found to have plentiful ammunition, but no direction systems or charts for indirect fire. Only a few 1:100,000-scale maps were available at the fortress. The actual artillery charts for the fortress were stored in Trondheim and fell into the hands of the Germans on 9 April and were used by the Wehrmacht during the siege to deploy artillery in places that the fortress could not hit. The same day troops of Holtermann's unit were positioned around Hegra railway station and Mælen bridge, and the first German attempt at making the fortress surrender was carried out. A German Major approached the fortress together with two Norwegian officers who had given up the same day. Despite the best efforts by both the German officer and the two surrendered Norwegians, Holtermann refused to capitulate. The next day, 13 April, Major Holtermann achieved contact with his superiors at the 5th Division for the last time during the Norwegian Campaign. Through a telephone conversation, the commander of the force at Hegra was told to act as he saw best and, if possible, to hinder the Germans in gaining control of the Meråkerbanen railway line to Sweden. In response to these orders, 20 soldiers were sent to the village of Flornes to set up field fortifications and block the road and railway to Meråker Municipality.

=== Friendly fire incident ===
On 14 April, reports came in to the troops stationed at Hegra village stating that a train loaded with German soldiers had left Hell railway station and was on its way to Hegra. Not long after a train approached Hegra Station and ignored signals to stop. In response to what was interpreted as a German troop train trying to force its way through, the soldiers guarding the station opened fire on the approaching train. However, the train was in fact carrying Finnish refugees home after the Winter War. The fire killed one Norwegian man and wounded two Finnish women. Later that afternoon, the garrison's sole female member joined when nurse Anne Margrethe Bang from Trondheim arrived at the fortress bearing a load of medical supplies. The daughter of a doctor and trained in first aid, Bang stayed in the fortress for the duration of the siege, helping two military doctors care for the sick and wounded.

=== German aircraft driven off by ground fire ===
The first shots fired by the fortress's defenders occurred on 14 April, the same day as the friendly-fire train incident, when a Norwegian heavy machine gun fired at and damaged a German aircraft, driving it away. More equipment and ammunition from Værnes arrived at the fortress the same day.

== Battle ==
=== German capture of the surrounding area ===
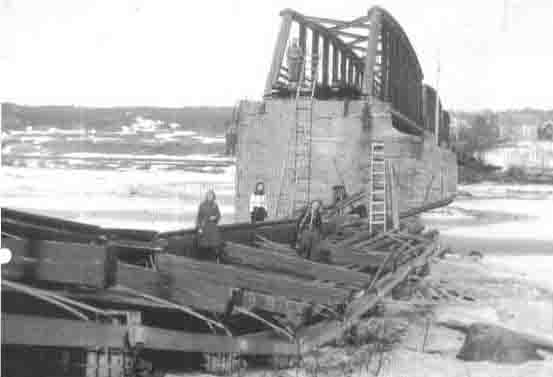
Hegra Bridge after the initial fighting

==== Attack on Hegra village ====
At 05:30 on 15 April, the Germans attacked the Norwegian positions defending the Hegra railway station, Hegra road bridge and Mælen bridge, supported by artillery fire. Having been partly caught by surprise, the Norwegian forces at the Hegra road bridge and the railway station made a fighting retreat to the fortress over a two- to three-hour period. Early on in the fighting, the Norwegians demolished the Hegra road bridge, forcing the German infantry to cross the precarious ice of the frozen Stjørdal River under fire. At Mælen bridge, the guards withdrew to the south. Four Norwegian soldiers fell in and around Hegra, while one was killed at Mælen bridge. In addition to those killed, eight Norwegian soldiers were taken prisoner during the initial German attack.

==== Fortress artillery intervenes ====
As the German attack developed, the artillery pieces at Hegra Fortress opened up to support the Norwegian troops under attack in the valley below, and later covered their retreat. The Norwegian artillery fire was directed at German artillery positions, machine gun nests and convoys of trucks pushing east towards the Swedish border. The telephone operator at Hegra telegraph station acted as an observer for the artillery at the fortress. Artillery fire from the fortress knocked out three German artillery pieces and inflicted casualties on the attacking force.

==== Skirmish on the fortress road ====
As the Norwegian infantry force pulled out of Hegra and up the road towards the fortress, the Germans pursued them until they reached a number of field fortifications blocking the road. At this position, the Norwegians held their ground and inflicted fatalities on the attacking force. Amongst the German fatalities was the attacking platoon's leader, Oberleutnant Hans-Joachim Herrmann. After the fighting, as the Norwegians were going through the area to seize German arms and equipment, they found the German Gefreiter Hugo Bayerle. Bayerle had been hit in both thighs, sustaining a broken femur, and was bleeding profusely. The Norwegian troops brought him on a ski sled to the fortress for medical care.

==== End of the first day of the battle ====
At the end of the first day of serious fighting, the Germans pushed on along the Meråkerbanen railway line and broke through the blocking position at Flornes. The troops holding Flornes withdrew first to Meråker, then further north to join other Norwegian forces. As night fell, German troops had occupied the areas around the villages of Hegra, Avelsgaard, Flornes, Ingstad and Sona. During the day, Luftwaffe aircraft had repeatedly overflown Hegra Fortress. The Norwegian troops had fired on the aircraft with both rifles and machine guns, damaging one aircraft, which crashed while attempting an emergency landing at Værnes.

=== Attempts to storm the fortress ===
The day after the German capture of the area surrounding the fortress, Luftwaffe aircraft repeatedly attacked with bombs and machine gun fire. German infantry probed the approaches to the fortifications but were driven off by artillery and heavy machine gun fire. A German mountain howitzer brought up to Avelsgaard bombarded the fortress, destroying most of the houses outside the walls. One Norwegian soldier was killed by a shell hitting the fortress parapet. He was the last Norwegian fatality of the battle.

==== First German charge ====
17 April began with a bombardment at 07:00 from the air and by the howitzer position at Avelsgaard. At 09:00, a large force of German infantry attacked from the north-east, supported by machine gun positions situated a mere 150 m (160 yd) north of the fortress. The progress of the attack was only halted when it reached the barbed-wire entanglements directly in front of the Norwegian trenches. At this point, the attacking force was subjected to heavy fire at close range from artillery, machine guns and riflemen, and thrown back. German bombers kept on hitting the fortress throughout the day, knocking out both the telephone line and the electricity supply. Neither came back into operation during the siege. From then until the end of the battle, all light inside the Norwegian tunnels and halls was provided by candles and nine kerosene lamps.

==== Second attack is aborted ====
The day after their first unsuccessful attack, the German forces made another attempt at storming the mountain fortress. In preparation, the fortifications were subjected to heavy machine gun and mortar fire during the early daylight hours. A battalion of infantry was brought forward towards the fortress, but was hit by a blizzard while marching through no man's land. As the attacking units lost their bearing in the storm, fire fights erupted between groups of Germans mistaking each other for Norwegian patrols and the whole enterprise collapsed before reaching the Norwegian positions. Bombers and heavy calibre artillery pieces kept up steady fire against the fortress throughout the day.

=== Siege ===
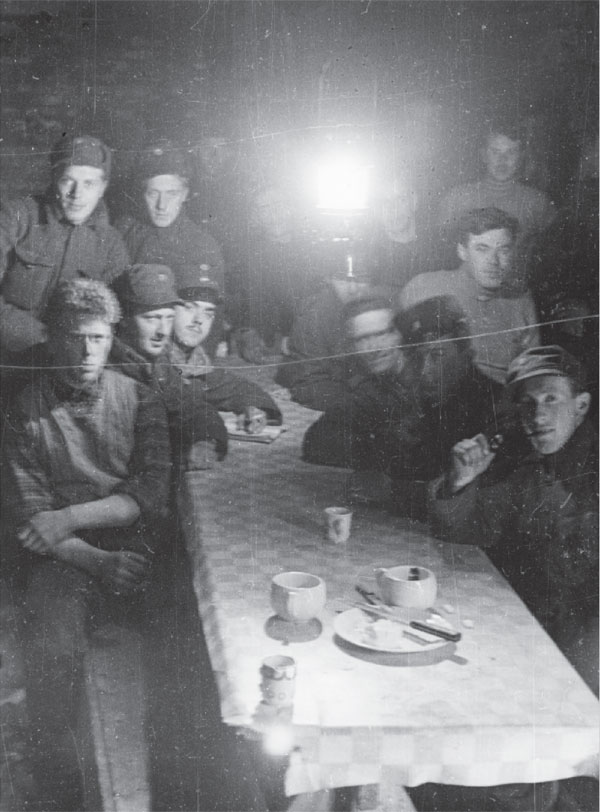
Some of the Norwegian defenders gathered in one of the fortress's subterranean halls during the siege

==== Evacuation of wounded ====
In the evening of 18 April, two Norwegian doctors—Sigurd Aarrestad and Peter Berdal—approached the German commander of the Hegra-Son area and requested permission to pass through the German lines to evacuate wounded soldiers from the fortress. During the previous days' fighting many German wounded had been brought to Hegra village and the doctors feared that there had been numerous casualties on the Norwegian side as well. Permission for the mission was granted, and the shelling of Hegra Fortress was temporarily suspended while local volunteers made their way up to the fortress, pulling ski sleds for the wounded. While Aarrestad led the expedition, Berdal was held hostage by the Germans to ensure that the Norwegians returned from the fortress after finishing their mission. When Aarrestad returned from Hegra Fortress a few hours later, he brought along nine wounded Norwegian soldiers and Gefreiter Bayerle, who had been released by his captors and sent along with the wounded Norwegians. As part of the agreement, the Norwegian wounded did not become prisoners of war.

==== Attempts to storm the fortress are abandoned ====
From around 25 April, the Germans gave up on storming Hegra Fortress. The pressing need to remove the Norwegian force ended in large part when the important town of Steinkjer fell to the Germans on 21 April and the Allied advance from the north was checked. The southern arm of the Allied counter-attack had never swung north from Åndalsnes and had instead been directed to the Gudbrandsdal in order to support the Norwegian forces fighting there. As the immediate crisis had passed for the German force in Trondheim, they preferred to push south to link up with forces coming up from Oslo. The focus of the Wehrmacht became to bombard Hegra Fortress with artillery and air power to try to pummel it into submission.

==== Artillery duels, aerial bombing and patrol engagements ====
For the remainder of the battle, the Germans did not try to storm the fortress again. Fighting consisted of aerial bombing of the fortress, duels between the fortress's guns and German field artillery and skirmishes between German and Norwegian ski units doing reconnaissance and bringing in supplies of food, ammunition and fuel. Several Norwegian soldiers were captured as a result of the patrol actions. To counter German guns placed in the positional guns' blind zones, the Norwegian artillerymen positioned their two 8.4 cm field guns to cover areas the fixed guns could not reach. During the siege, the Norwegian guns targeted machine gun nests, gun positions, command posts and ammunition depots in the surrounding area. On 23 April, one of the 7.5 cm positional guns was knocked out, one of the fortress's command towers was destroyed and the water line was broken. The second 7.5 cm gun was destroyed on 24 April. The fortress was under constant artillery fire and held out chiefly in order to be in a position to support the Allied offensive expected from the north.

On 25 April, the Germans employed a new weapon against the fortress when a seaplane dropped a 1,800 kg (4,000 lb) bomb, destroying the houses outside the walls, with shrapnel ending up in Hegra village several kilometres away. From 29 April, the artillery bombardment steadily increased in strength, with German guns reinforced by captured Norwegian 12 cm (4.7 in) howitzers from the armoury in Trondheim, and the next day one of the three 10.5 cm guns at the fortress was knocked out. During the siege, a total of over 2,300 shells struck Hegra Fortress.

==== Værnes Air Station ====
One way that Holtermann wanted to directly support the main war effort in Norway was to bombard Værnes Air Base, the northernmost airfield in German hands and vital for the support of German forces north of Trondheim. This was particularly so for the Narvik front, which could not be reached by aircraft flying from further south than Værnes. Recognising this, the Germans had hired some 2,000 Norwegian collaborationist labourers to work full-time at expanding and improving the air strip. Bombarding Værnes would both have disrupted this work and impaired the bombing raids being flown against Norwegian forces fighting further to the north. However, since Værnes is 11.5 km (7.1 mi) from Hegra, and the fortress's guns only had a maximum range of some 9 km (5.6 mi), this was impossible. For accurate firing, the effective range was a mere 6.9 km (4.3 mi), as that was the range of the artillery's height angle meter. Efforts were made at the fortress to increase the elevation of the guns from 19° to 26° by removing part of the gun shields, and part of the gun mounting, but these failed as no welding equipment could be acquired to carry out the modifications. Even though no modifications could be carried out, one of the 10.5 cm guns at Hegra opened fire in the direction of Værnes on 22 April. With the gun firing at maximum elevation, the rounds still fell hundreds of metres short of their intended target.

The earliest attempt by the Hegra garrison to attack the airfield at Værnes had occurred on 14 April, when a Norwegian dog sled patrol spotted massive German air activity at the air base. Plans were made to manhandle one of the fortress's 8.4 cm field guns to a nearby hill called Blankhammeren, and from there bombard German targets out of range from the fortress itself, including the strategically important airfield. The plan, however, could not be carried out before the German attack of 15 April brought large German infantry forces into the area and rendered the plans infeasible.

==== International media attention ====
During the siege, the struggle of Hegra Fortress captured the attention of the international media, with articles such as those in The Daily Telegraph on 22 April and 2 May, and that in The Manchester Guardian on 16 April. The fortress was also mentioned in articles in Time magazine on 6 May and 13 May.

== Surrender ==
=== Preparations and influencing factors ===
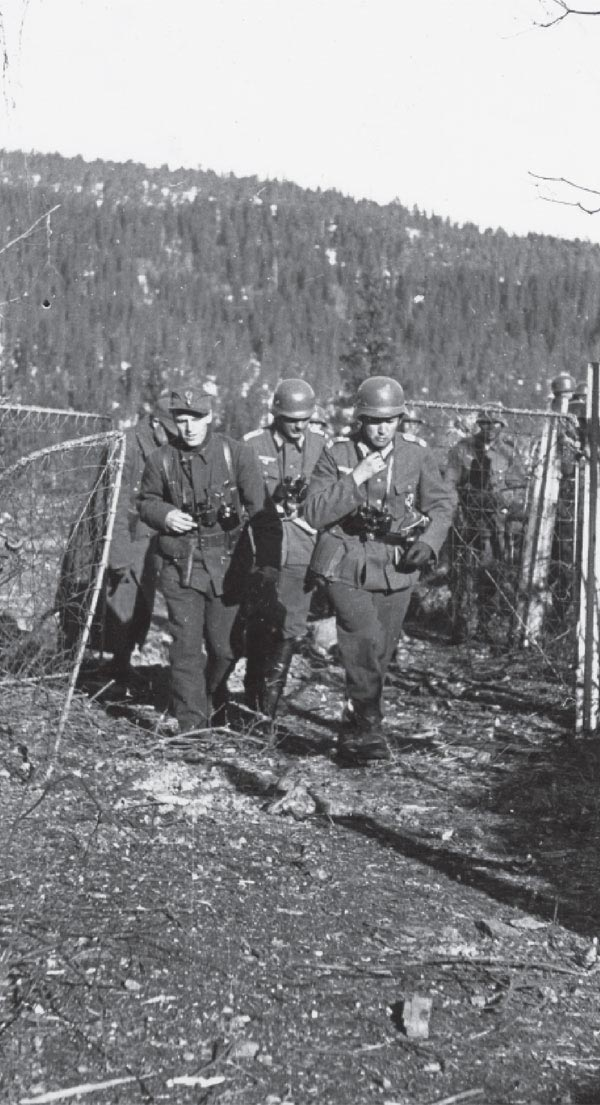
Hauptmann Giebel entering the fortress gates to accept the Norwegian surrender

News came in over the radio on 2 May of the Allied retreat from the Åndalsnes area, that the Germans had seized control of the Dovre Line from Dombås to Støren, and of the surrender of the Norwegian 4th Brigade in Western Norway. This came on top of increasing supply problems, with the bread supply already having run out on 30 April. The next day, 3 May, the garrison started destroying its artillery ammunition in preparation for surrender. The three Swedish volunteers that had endured the siege with the Norwegians were released from their duties and guided across the mountains to the Swedish border by a ski patrol. During the day, a radio message from Colonel Ole Berg Getz—the Norwegian commander in the Trøndelag area—was broadcast. Getz had surrendered his forces in Nord-Trøndelag and advised all Norwegian forces in Trøndelag to lay down their arms as the situation had become hopeless after the British retreat from the southern parts of Norway. The decision to surrender Trøndelag had been influenced by Neville Chamberlain's radio message that day announcing the end of the Allied campaign in Southern Norway. On 4 May, destruction of radios, machine guns, carbines and other small arms was initiated and ski patrols were sent out carrying loads of important documents. By 13:50 that day confirmation of Colonel Getz's capitulation was received and the destruction of the fortress's artillery began.

=== Capitulation ===
In the early hours of 5 May, the situation was such that there was very little food left and water for only a few days, all other Norwegian and Allied forces in all of southern Norway had been withdrawn or had surrendered and Hegra Fortress was the last remaining pocket of resistance south of Nordland. At 05:00, Major Holtermann had his men assemble in the tunnels and relayed to them his decision to surrender the fortress. In a short speech, he thanked them for their efforts and then led them in singing the Norwegian National Anthem. By 05:25, a white flag was raised over the fortress, and at 06:30 a force of 60 German soldiers and three officers—led by one Hauptmann Giebel—arrived to accept the surrender of the garrison. Later that day, 190 men and one woman marched out of the fortress and into captivity. At the surrender, the garrison at Hegra Fortress consisted of 14 officers, one technical officer, seven sergeants, one officer cadet, six corporals, 161 privates and nurse Anne Margrethe Bang.

=== Garrison as prisoners of war ===
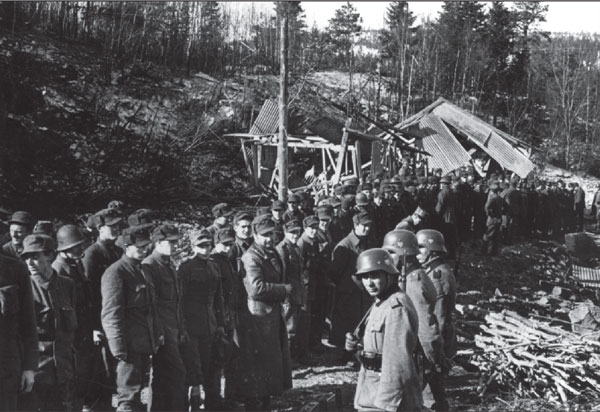
The surrendered garrison assembled in the ruined fortress camp.

After the surrender, the Norwegians were marched down to Hegra railway station from where they were transported by train. In Trondheim, the officers and Anne Margrethe Bang were taken off the train and interned at Trondheim katedralskole secondary school while the NCOs and soldiers continued their journey to Lundamo in Gauldalen valley. At Lundamo, the prisoners were interned in a barn for the night. The next day, 6 May, the prisoners from Hegra were force-marched for 50 km (31 mi) to Berkåk where a prisoner-of-war camp was established. At Berkåk, the prisoners were set at work at building an improvised road from the river Orkla near Berkåk across the woods to Brattset. The road was intended to help the German logistic system that had been severely hampered by the numerous bridges that had been blown by the Norwegian Army during the preceding month. Due in part to the poor physical condition of the prisoners after the harsh siege they had just experienced, the road was never completed despite threats of punishment made by the German camp commander. At the end of May the German High Command in Berlin announced that Adolf Hitler had personally ordered the release of Norwegian prisoners of war as an act of recognition of the defence they had put up under difficult conditions. The release of the prisoners from Hegra happened in groups and by mid-June the last PoWs had been let go.

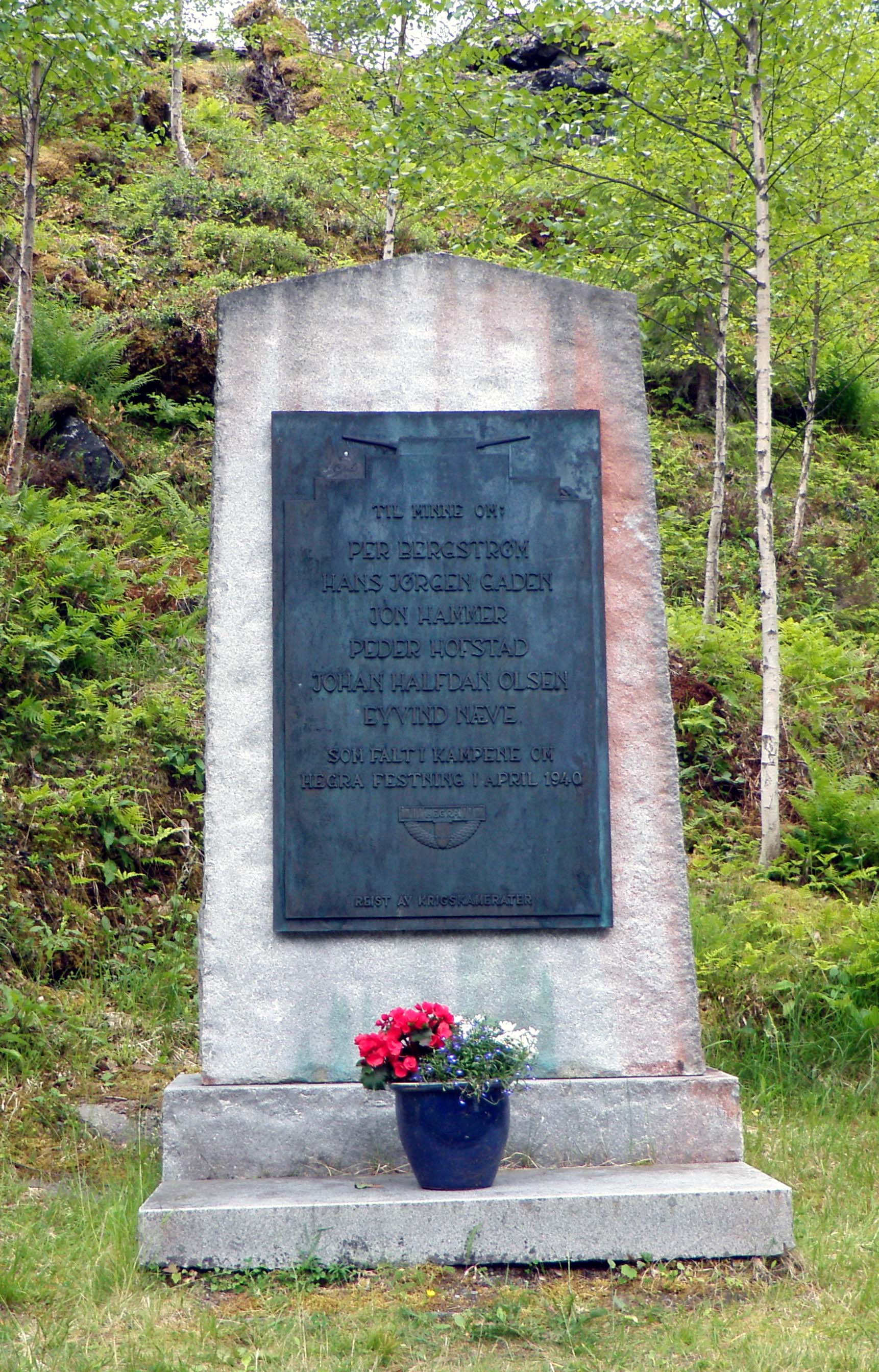
Memorial at Hegra Fortress, commemorating the six Norwegian soldiers killed in the battle

== Casualties ==
Six Norwegian soldiers were killed in action during the battle, with 14 wounded. All the Norwegian fatalities occurred during the first two days of the fighting. In the first years after World War II, Norwegian estimates of the number of German casualties were exaggerated, some spoke of up to 1,100 dead or wounded. Later research has, however, led to a substantially lower number, at about 150 to 200 Wehrmacht soldiers killed or wounded at Hegra.

== See also ==
- List of Norwegian military equipment of World War II
- List of German military equipment of World War II

== Bibliography ==
- Arnstad, Johan (1965). Beleiringen av Hegra Festning 10. april – 5. mai 1940 (in Norwegian). Trondheim: F. Bruns bokforhandels forlag.
- Brox, Karl H. (2005). Hegra festning 1905–2005 (in Norwegian). Oslo: Foreningen Hegra Festnings Venner. ISBN 82-303-0476-9.
- Brox, Karl H. (1988). Kampen om Hegra – festningen tyskerne ikke greide å ta (in Norwegian). Oslo: Gyldendal Norsk Forlag. ISBN 82-05-17716-3.
- Grimnes, Ole Kristian (1994). Kampen om Hegra 1940 (in Norwegian). Oslo: Forsvarets Pressetjeneste.
- Østbye, Gudbrand (1963). Krigen i Norge 1940. Operasjonene i Nord-Trøndelag (in Norwegian). Oslo: Forsvarets Krigshistoriske Avdeling / Gyldendal.
- Soldat 31358-38 (1985). Rapport fra Hegra Fort (in Norwegian). Trondheim: Foreningen Hegra 1940.
