= Bryn Church =

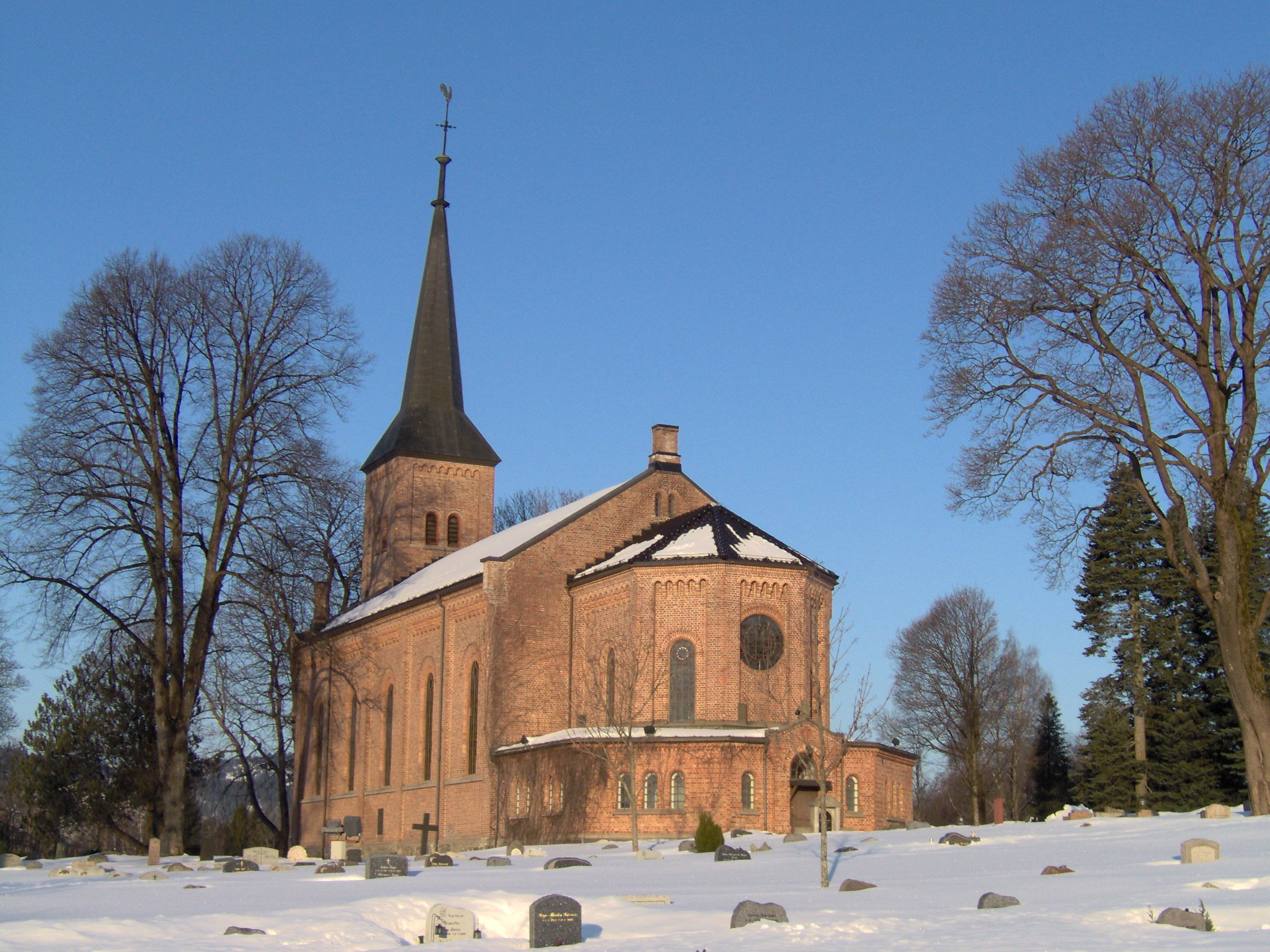

- Location in Akershus
- 59°55′15.632″N 10°29′17.981″E
- Location: Rykkinn, Akershus
- Country: Norway
- Denomination: Church of Norway
- Churchmanship: Evangelical Lutheran

History
- Status: Parish church

Architecture
- Functional status: Active
- Architect: Peter Høier Holtermann
- Completed: June 28, 1861

Specifications
- Capacity: 400
- Materials: Brick

Administration
- Diocese: Diocese of Oslo
- Deanery: Bærum
- Parish: Bryn

Bryn Church (Norwegian: Bryn kirke) is a long church (Norwegian: langkirke) located in Rykkinn in the municipality of Bærum in Akershus county, Norway. The church functions both as a road church and is the parish church for Bryn.

== History ==
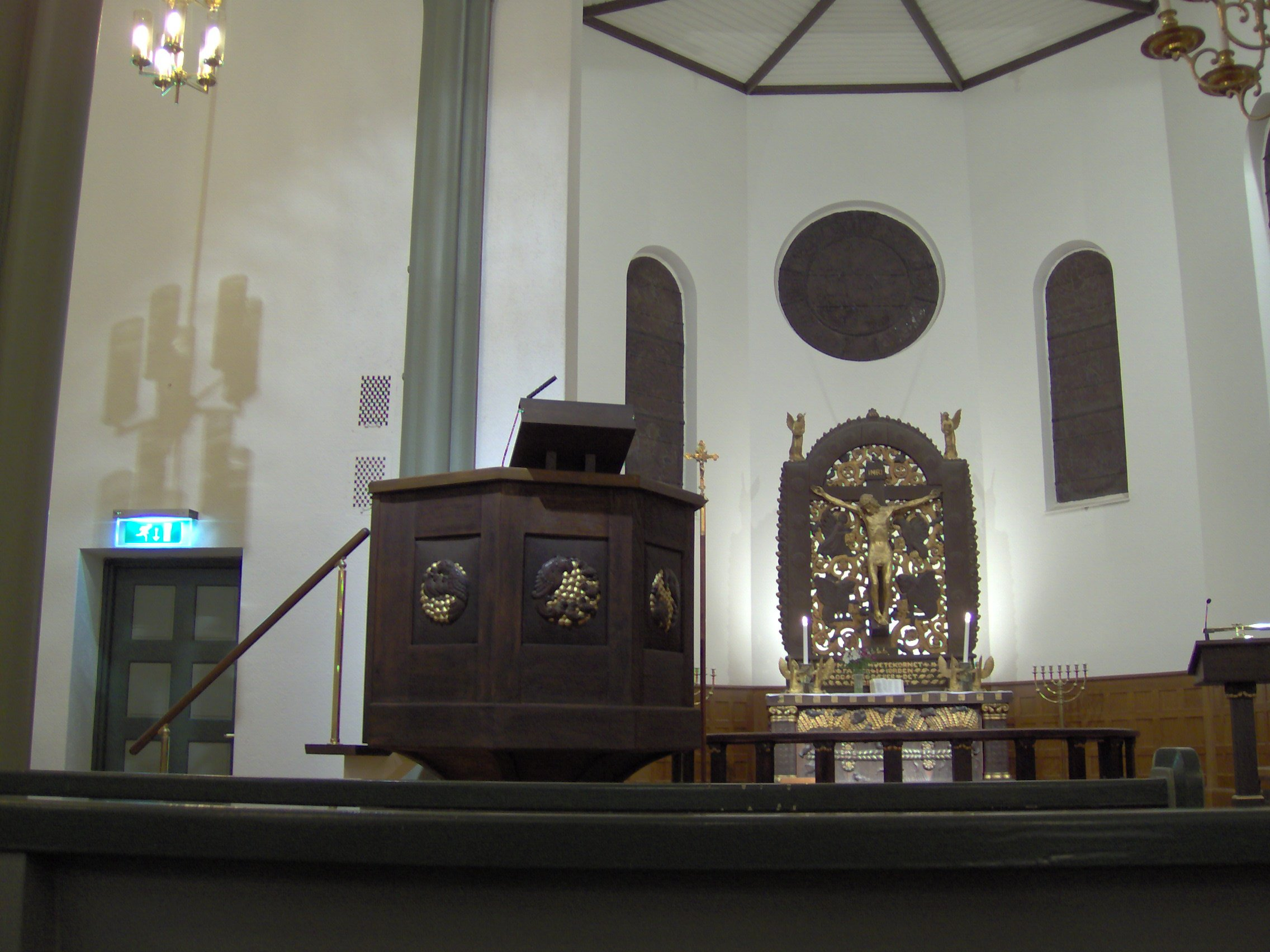
Chancel in Bryn Church

The church was built in 1861 based on plans by the architect Peter Høier Holtermann.The church was consecrated during a major ceremony on June 28, 1861. Gunder Kristensen Krydsby from Lommedalen transported the two church bells from Oslo by horse and wagon.

The newspaper Ringeriges Ugeblad (now Ringerikes Blad) wrote that: "Already early in the morning, crowds were seen along all the roads heading to the church. About 800 admission tickets were given out. The church opened at 9:30, and those that had tickets were able to enter and take their place. At 10:00 the procession set out from the Bryn farm. It consisted of ten priests from the deanery. The town's new and very attractive church was consecrated."

The church is made of brick and can accommodate 400 people. There is a cemetery next to the church. An urn with the remains of the film director Rasmus Breistein is kept at the church.

Some of the church's furnishings were newly purchased, some were received as gifts, and some were transferred from the medieval Tanum Church. The chancel decoration was created by Emanuel Vigeland, the brother of Gustav Vigeland.

The church was restored in 1959–60 by the architect Finn Bryn (1890-1975). In 2007–2008 the church spire was repaired, and an old scroll was found in the soffit relating how the church's foundation stone was laid, who had participated in the construction of the church, and who had paid for the work.

The cemetery, measuring 70 mål (7 hectares or 17 acres), is planned to be expanded by 60 mål (6 hectares or 15 acres) and excavation work has started. The digging has revealed a number of archaeological finds from the early Iron Age from c. 500 BC and from the Middle Ages, including graves and traces of settlement from the Iron Age.

== Sesquicentennial ==
The celebration of the church's sesquicentennial in 2011 involved concerts, exhibits, and a special anniversary religious service in the church. A volume commemorating the anniversary was edited by Bjørn Sandvik.
