= Ove Bjelke Holtermann =

Norwegian architect (1852–1936)

Ove Bjelke Holtermann (29 December 1852 – 5 February 1936) was a Norwegian architect.

He was a son of vicar Eiler Hagerup Holtermann (1811–1872), and a nephew of architect Peter Høier Holtermann and an uncle of major general Hans Reidar Holtermann.

He studied in Trondhjem from 1871 to 1874 and at the Polytechnical School of Hannover from 1880 to 1881 under Conrad Wilhelm Hase. In between he worked in Christiania. From 1881 he worked in Kragerø, where he mainly designed villas, and in 1890 he became an assistant of Georg Andreas Bull in Christiania. From 1900 to 1920 he was a building inspector in the Norwegian capital.

== See also ==
- Architecture
- Construction
