= Peter Høier Holtermann =

Norwegian architect (1820–1865)

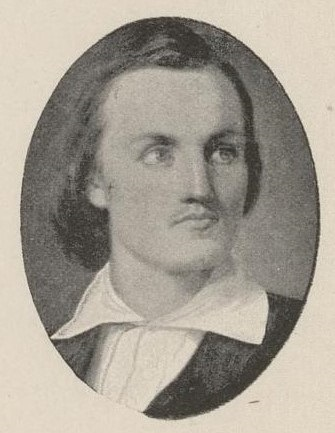
P.H. Holtermann, unknown date.

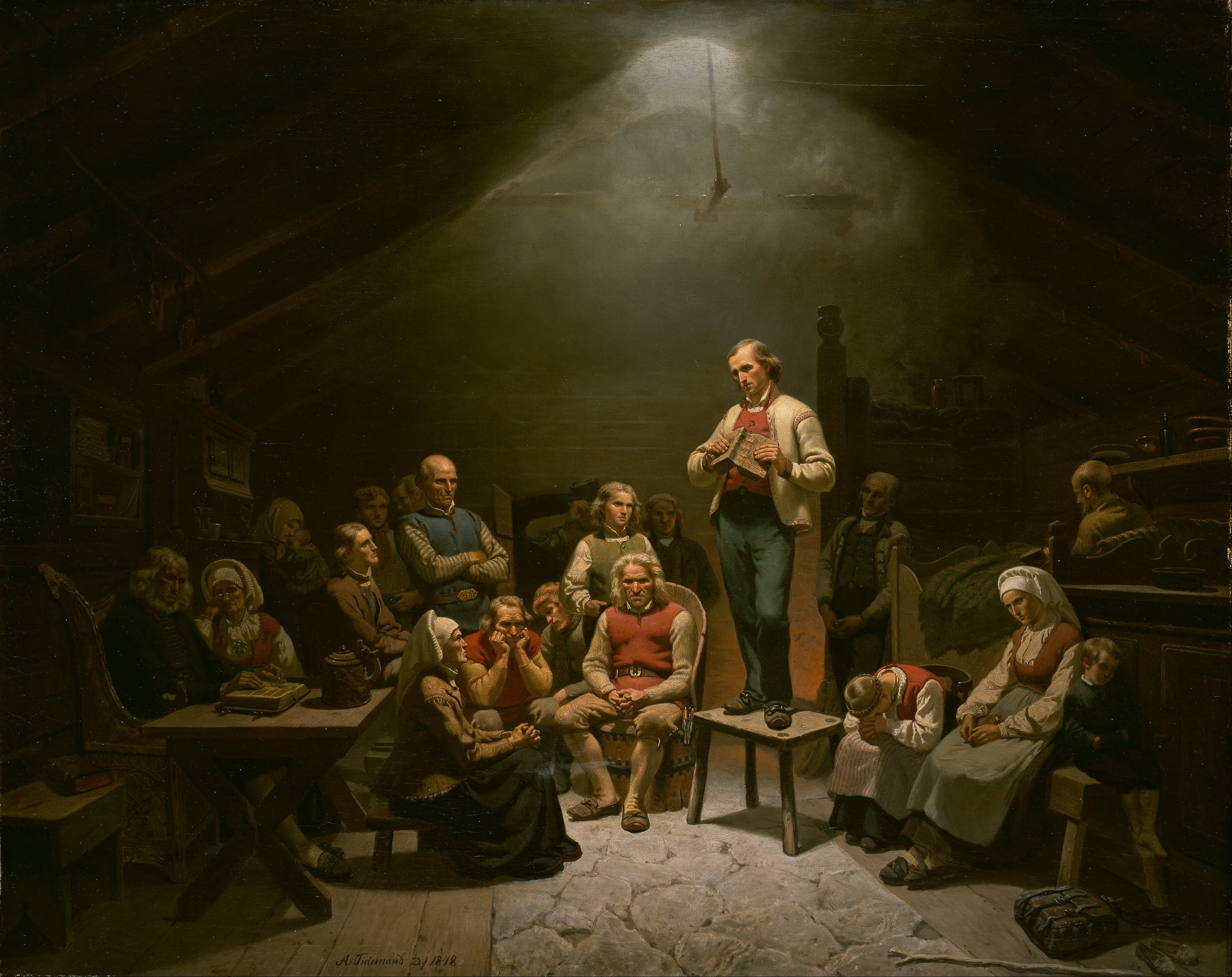
Holtermann served as model for the preacher, the central figure, in the 1848 painting Haugianerne ("Low Church Devotion") by Adolph Tidemand. This is Tidemand’s main work.

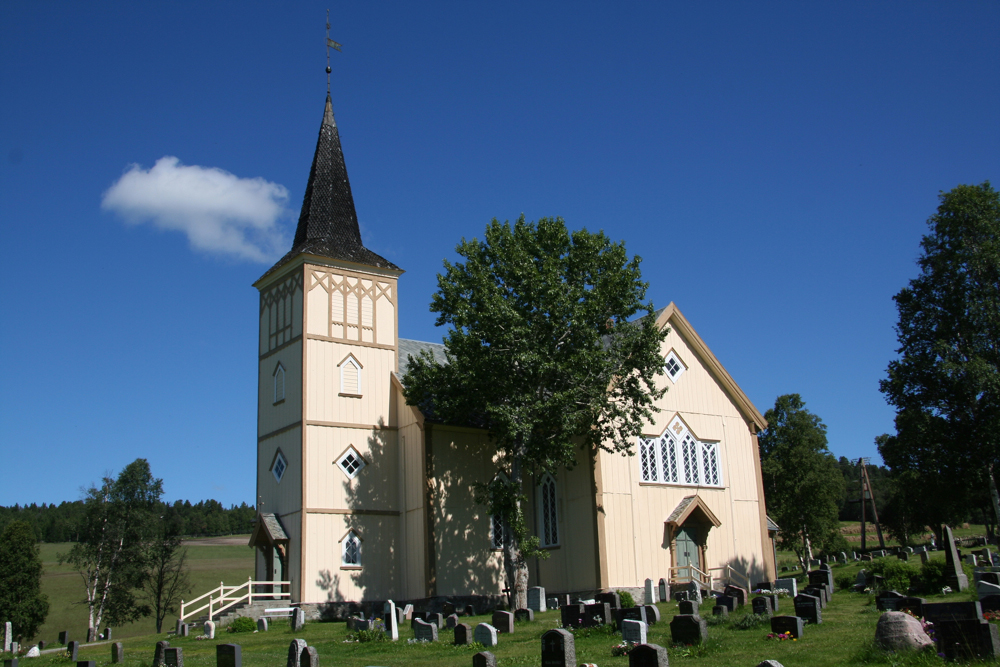
Os Church (1862)

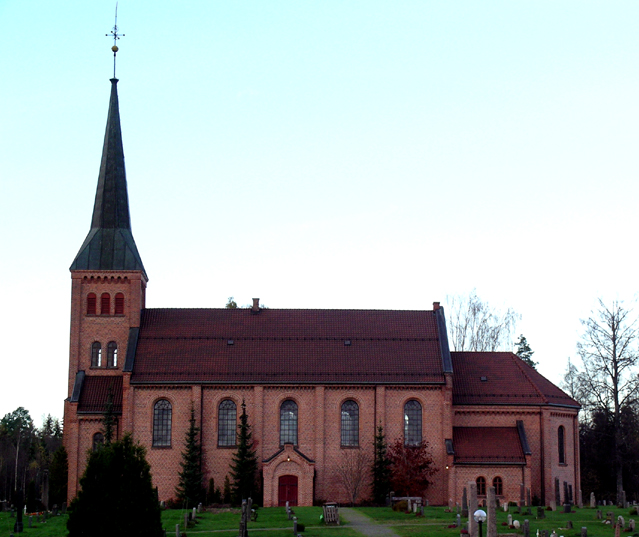
Nes Church in Akershus (1860)

Peter Høier Holtermann (16 November 1820 – 24 August 1865) was a Norwegian architect.

== Biography ==
He was born in Austrått, in what is now Ørland Municipality in Trøndelag County, Norway. He was a son of assessor Ove Bjelke Holtermann (1782–1857), and a second cousin of major general Eiler Christian Holtermann, uncle of architect Ove Bjelke Holtermann and a granduncle of major general Hans Reidar Holtermann.

He attended the Norwegian National Academy of Craft and Art Industry before studying in Berlin from 1842 to 1846. In 1846 he returned to Norway and established an architect's office in Christiania. His designs include the Norwegian College of Agriculture, Christiania Seildugsfabrik, Tromsø city hall and Christiania Sparebank, all erected during the 1850s and 1860s. His church designs include those in Nes Church, Aremark Church, Treungen Church and Holla Church. Many of his works have been torn down or destroyed.

From 1862 to his death he was the chairman of the Norwegian Polytechnic Society. He died in 1865 in a working accident.

== Selected works ==
=== Churches ===
- Haslum Church, Bærum Municipality, Akershus (rebuilt 1853)
- Nes Church, Nes Municipality Akershus (1860)
- Aremark Church, Aremark Municipality, Østfold (1861)
- Bryn Church, Bærum Municipality, Akershus (1861)
- Treungen Church in Nissedal Municipality, Telemark (1863)
- Holla Church in Nome Municipality, Telemark (1865–67)

=== Other ===
- Agricultural University in Ås Municipality (1854–1959)
- Christiania Seildugsfabrik in Oslo (1856)
- Akerselvens Klædefabrik (1865)
- City Hall and the Latin School in Tromsø (1862–1965)

Preceded by Kristian Kornelius Hagemann Brandt	Chairman of the Norwegian Polytechnic Society; 1862–1865	Succeeded by H. Koch
