= Hegra Fortress =

Fort in Trøndelag, Norway

Coordinates: 63°27′03″N 11°09′45″E

- Hegra festning
- Hegra, Norway
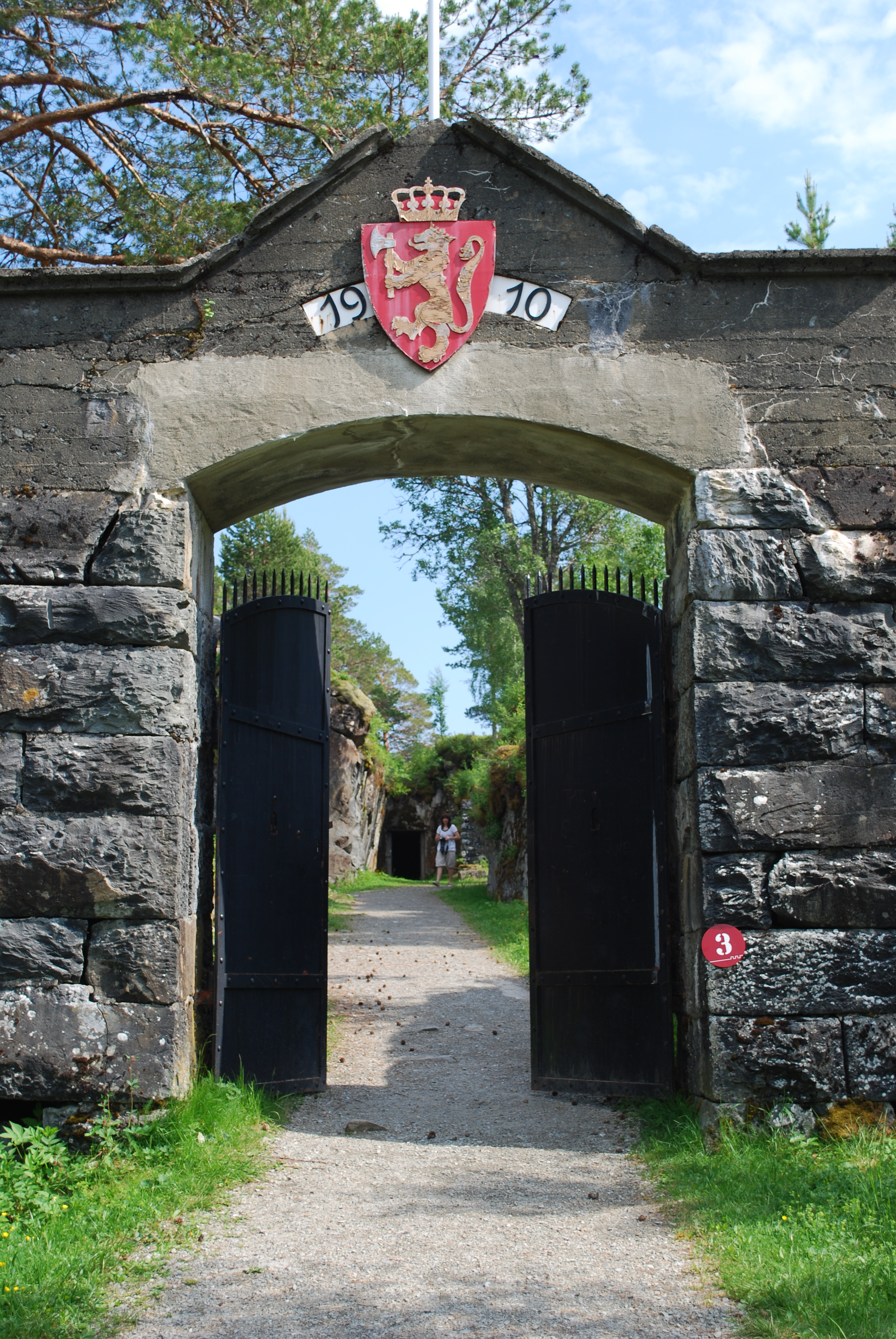
- Gate to the fortress, with tunnel entrance in the background

Site information
- Type: Mountain fortress
- Controlled by: Norway; Nazi Germany (1940–1945)

Site history
- Built: 1908–1910, Limited improvements 1916–1918
- In use: 1907–1926 and 1940
- Materials: Rock, reinforced concrete and brick (brick was only used for secondary areas out of the line of fire)
- Battles/wars: Second World War: Norwegian Campaign; Battle of Hegra Fortress

Garrison information
- Past commanders: Hans Reidar Holtermann (1940)

Hegra Fortress (Norwegian: Hegra festning) is a small mountain fortress in the village of Hegra in Stjørdal Municipality in Trøndelag county, Norway. Originally known as Ingstadkleiven Fort (also Ingstadkleiva Fort), it was built between 1908–1910 as a border fort as a defence against the perceived threat of a Swedish invasion.

== Background ==
The intent behind Ingstadkleiva Fort was to block Swedish advances into Central Norway, as had happened repeatedly during the Swedish-Norwegian conflicts in the preceding centuries, for example the Hannibal War, Northern Wars, and Great Northern War. After the 1905 dissolution of the union between Norway and Sweden, the Norwegian military harboured continued fears of a Swedish invasion to retake Norway.

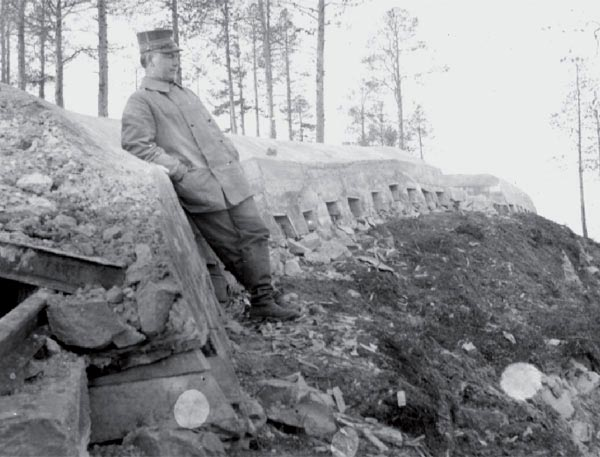
The fortress' trench line during construction

As a successful attack into the centre of the country could split it in half, the Norwegian general staff in February 1906 suggested the construction of a blocking fort in the Stjørdalen valley. Ingstadkleiva was early on pointed out as a good location to block an advance from the east. Already in March that year the Minister of Defence, commanding general, and chief of the Fortress Artillery surveyed the site and agreed to the plan. In a closed meeting on 26 April 1906, the Norwegian Parliament authorized the construction of Ingstadkleiva Fort, but no funds were allocated until 12 July 1907. In May 1908, the work began on the road up to the construction site and by January 1910 the fort was ready for use.

== Geography ==
The fort was built on, and named after, Ingstadkleiva — a 215-metre (705 ft) high forested hill south of the Stjørdalselva river, about 3 kilometres (1.9 mi) from the village of Hegra. To the east, north, and north-west the terrain slopes down towards the Stjørdalen valley and is dominated by the fort, while the south front is hilly and at a higher altitude than the Ingstadskleiva. Ingstadkleiva Fort has an excellent command of the Stjørdalen valley to the north and east, but to the west the view is blocked by the Grøthammeren and Hammeren hills, both about 300-metre (980 ft) high.

== Ingstadkleiva Fort ==
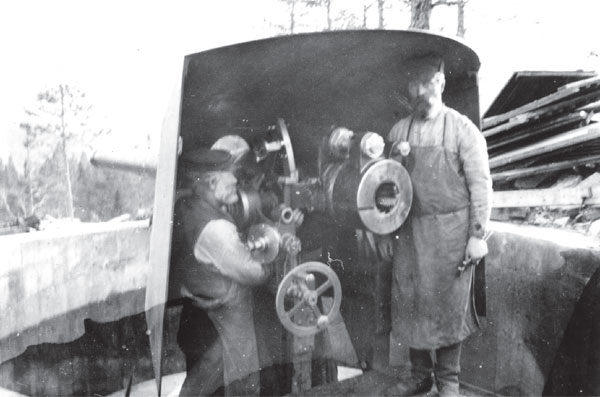
One of the fortress' 10.5 cm guns soon after installation

The fort's guns came from the dismantled Ørje Fortress in Marker Municipality. The artillery was made up of flat angle guns with a range of 6 to 9 kilometres (3.7 to 5.6 mi). The fortifications themselves consisted of 300 metres (980 ft) of halls and tunnels dynamited into the mountain at Ingstadkleiva, as well as trench systems and gun positions excavated from the rock with explosives. There are two main underground parallel tunnels of around 80 metres (260 ft) length, with a 35-metre (115 ft) tunnel connecting them at a straight angle. One of the main tunnels served as crew quarters while the other was in direct connection with the above ground artillery pits.

The fortress' artillery consisted of two 7.5-centimetre (3.0 in) and four 10.5-centimetre (4.1 in) positional artillery pieces in half-turrets placed in pits dynamited from the rock and lined with concrete, as well as four Krupp M/1887 field guns. The 8.4-centimetre (3.3 in) pieces, designed before the advent of recoil systems, were described by the Germans after the 1940 surrender as Napoleonic.

The positional artillery is placed in an almost straight line facing east, with a 20-metre (66 ft) distance between each 10.5-centimetre (4.1 in) gun and 16 metres (52 ft) between each 7.5-centimetre (3.0 in) piece.

To enable the fortress to withstand attack without support from outside a 5-to-8-metre (16 to 26 ft) wide barbed wire obstacle was constructed encircling the entire fortress.

=== Early period ===
During the period 1910 to 1926 the fort was used as a major military base for the Trøndelag border areas with Sweden. In 1926, Ingstadkleiva Fort was put in reserve as part of the post-World War I defence budget cuts.

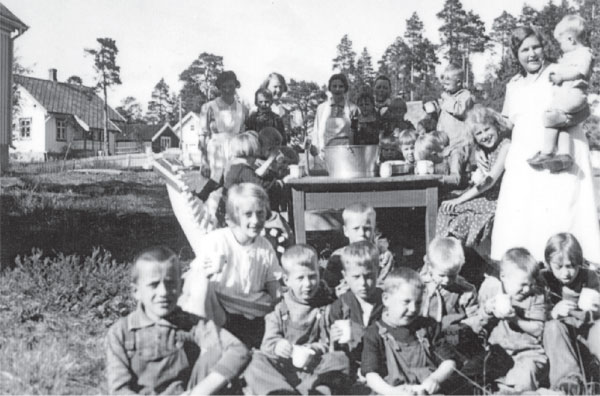
A Red Cross holiday camp held at the deactivated fortress in 1939

=== Deactivated period ===
From 1934–1939, the deactivated fort was used by the Norwegian Red Cross's youth branch as a summer holiday camp for children. In late 1939, Finnish soldiers of the independent Lapland Group who had crossed the Norwegian border into Finnmark escaping the fighting in the Petsamo district in northern Finland were interned at Ingstadkleiva Fort. All the Finns were repatriated during the early days of 1940. During the Finnish internees' stay a sauna was constructed at the fort's camp.

=== Norwegian Campaign ===
In 1940, from 15 April to 5 May, Hegra was attacked by the German invaders. During the first week the attacks consisted of two infantry assaults; however in the last two weeks attacks mostly featured heavy artillery fire and Luftwaffe bombing, as well as aggressive patrolling.

During the siege large portions of the fort were covered in snow, and as all plans of the fort were stored in German-occupied Trondheim several sections of the fortifications were not discovered by the defenders before the 5 May surrender.

== Present-day fortress ==
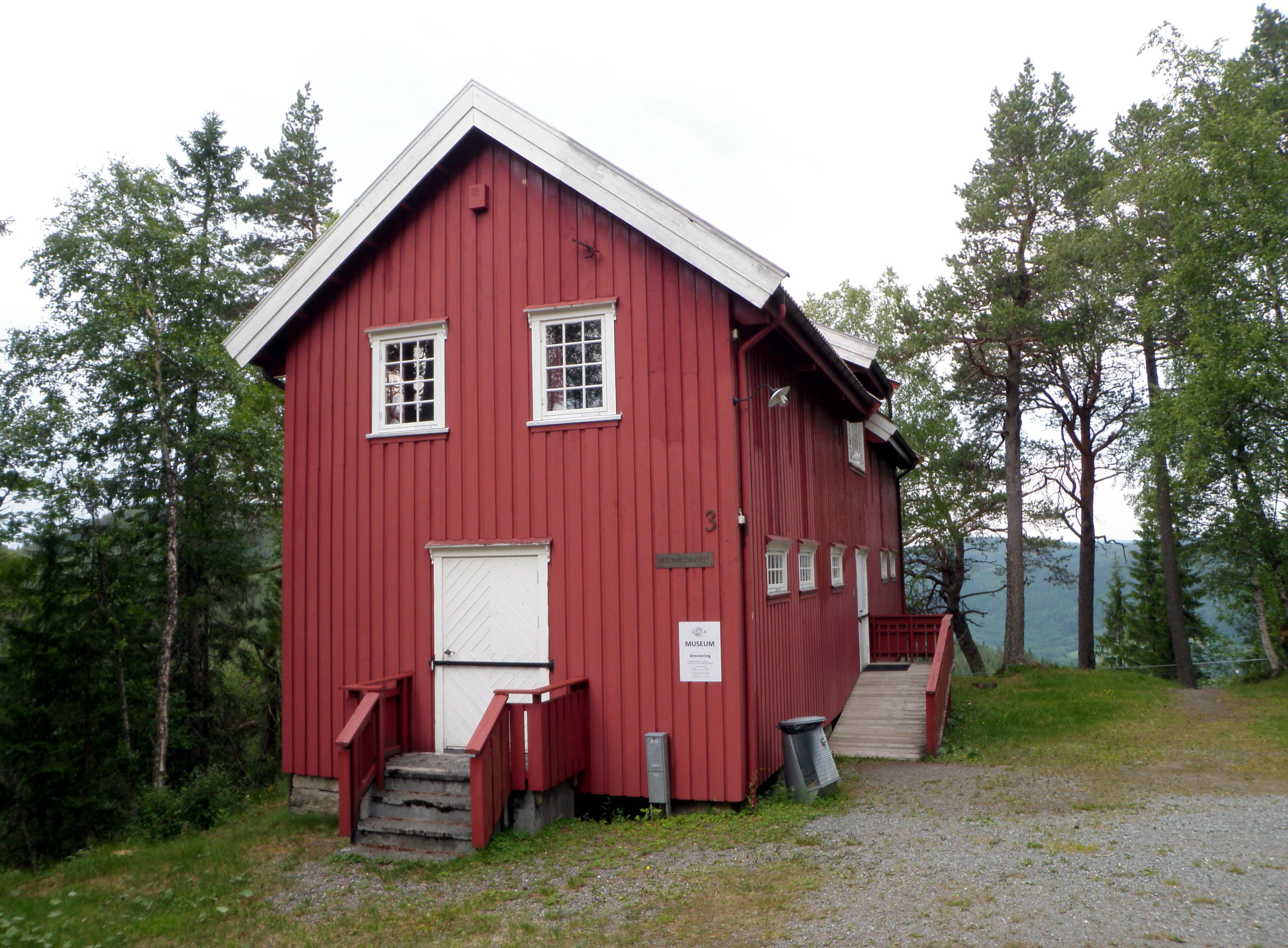
The fortress museum building (2014)

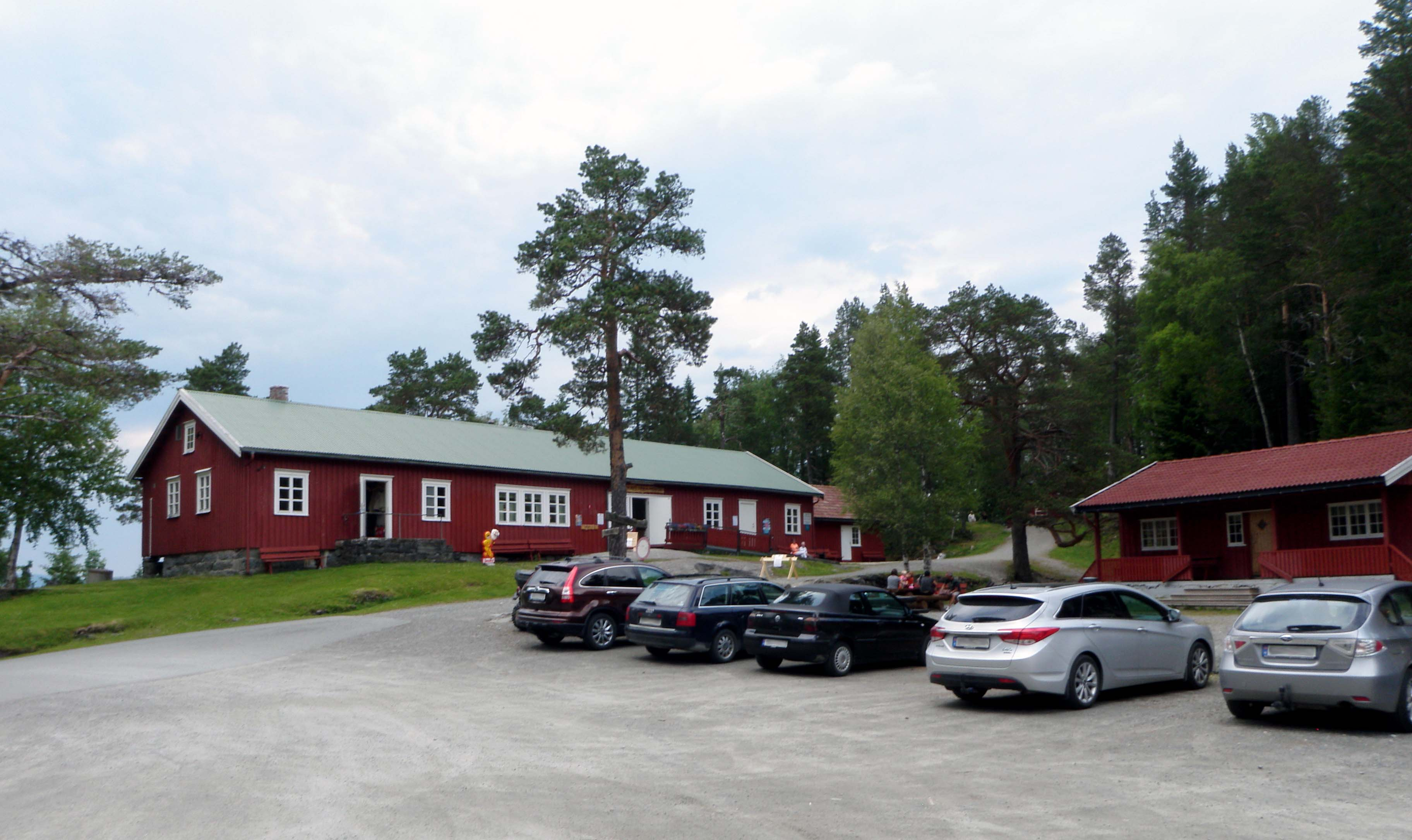
Present-day (2014) buildings at the fortress camp, restaurant building to the left, guide building to the right

After the end of the Second World War, Hegra Fortress was returned to Norwegian control and is today used as a museum with exhibitions detailing the fort's history with an emphasis on the 1940 siege. There is also a café and a souvenir shop. The museum is often used for conferences and for seminars on issues of war and peace. Hegra Fortress is still owned by the Norwegian Defence Force and financed through the Norwegian Ministry of Defence.

Hegra Rifle Club has since 13 May 1962 held an annual shooting competition at the fortress. Organized in commemoration of the 1940 battle and of the Second World War in general, the competition is held on the Sunday closest to 8 May (VE Day). The casing of a shell fired at the fortress in 1940 is awarded to the competition winner each year as a travelling trophy.

== Bibliography ==
- Arnstad, Johan (1965). Beleiringen av Hegra Festning 10. april – 5. mai 1940 (in Norwegian). Trondheim: F. Bruns bokforhandels forlag.
- Brox, Karl H. (1988). Kampen om Hegra – festningen tyskerne ikke greide å ta (in Norwegian). Oslo: Gyldendal Norsk Forlag. ISBN 82-05-17716-3.
