= Hans Reidar Holtermann =

Norwegian major general (1895–1966)

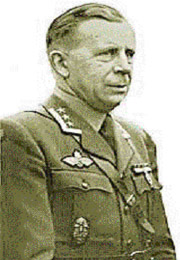
- Holtermann as an oberst in 1945
- Born: 20 October 1895; Sokndal Municipality, Rogaland
- Died: 25 October 1966 (aged 71); Bærum Municipality, Akershus
- Spouses: Elisabeth Jønsson (m. 1926) Maren Louise Hertzberg (m. 1947–1966)
- Relatives: Ove Bjelke Holtermann (uncle); Peter Høier Holtermann (great-uncle)
- Military career
- Allegiance: Norway
- Branch: Norwegian Army
- Service years: 1917–1962
- Rank: Generalmajor (Major General) of the Norwegian Army
- Nickname: "Majoren" (English: the Major)
- Commands: Commander of: Hegra Fortress; Norwegian Brigade in Scotland; District Command Trøndelag; Inspector General of the Army Artillery; Commander in Chief North Norway; Norwegian Army Command Germany; Army Staff Commander; Allied Land Forces Southern Norway; Norwegian Civil Defence forces
- Conflicts: World War II: Battle of Hegra Fortress (POW)
- Awards: (Norway) War Cross with sword (Norway) Knight, First Class of the Royal Norwegian Order of St Olav (Norway) Norwegian Military Journal's Silver Medal (Norway) Norwegian Athletic Society Medal in Gold (France) Légion d'honneur (Sweden) Knight 1st Class - Order of the Sword
- Other work: Economist; Office manager (1940–1942)

Hans Reidar Holtermann (born 20 October 1895 in Sokndal Municipality, died 25 November 1966 in Bærum Municipality) was a Norwegian military officer. Holtermann is best known as the commander of Hegra Fortress during the Battle of Hegra Fortress in the Norwegian Campaign of 1940.

During the inter-war years Holtermann attended military college in both Norway and France.

After the war he continued his military service, among other missions commanding the Independent Norwegian Brigade Group in Germany in 1949–1950.

== Early and personal life ==
Holtermann was the son of the district physician Sven Ruud Holtermann (1854–1916) and his wife, née Lehmann. Dr. Holtermann served in Sokndal, and Hans Reidar Holtermann grew up there. He was a nephew of architect Ove Bjelke Holtermann and a grandnephew of architect Peter Høier Holtermann.

On 29 November 1926, Holtermann married Helsingborg-born Elisabeth Jønsson (b. 25 January 1899) in Stockholm, Sweden. He remarried on 3 October 1947, when he married Maren Louise ("Vivi") Hertzberg.

== Studies ==
Having achieved the examen artium in 1914, Holtermann started his military career at Officer's School, and graduated in 1917 from the Norwegian Military Academy with the rank of premierløytnant (First Lieutenant) and from Military College in 1919. In the years 1919-1923 he served as an aspirant at the Norwegian General Staff.

He graduated from the Royal Frederick University in 1923 with a degree in economics.

After leaving university, Holtermann went to France. There he attended the École spéciale militaire de Saint-Cyr in France for three years from 1924 to 1926, gaining the French certificate of Brevet d'état-major. He also saw service with French military units. From 1926, he served as a junior officer at the General Staff.

== Military career ==
After completing his general staff training Holtermann served as Chief of staff for the Inspector General of the Norwegian Army's Field artillery, achieving the rank of kaptein in 1930. He also saw service as a scout in the Norwegian Army Air Service. In 1937 he became a major and second in command of Artillery Regiment no. 3 in Trondheim. He held this position until the German invasion of Norway on 9 April 1940.

Holtermann wrote several books on military topics, with Momenter for utarbeidelse av artilleriets ildplaner in 1930; Kamp om vasdrag in 1936; Lærebok i Norges krigshistorie in 1938, and finally the Civil Defence-related Enkelte synspunkter vedrørende nyordning av vårt sivilforsvar in 1958.

== Norwegian Campaign ==
=== Mobilising A.R.3 ===
As the German Gruppe 2 broke through the Norwegian coastal forts defending Trondheim major Holtermann was ordered to take part in the mobilisation of Artillery Regiment no. 3 at Værnes. As the Germans advanced on this important army camp it became impossible to complete the mobilisation there and Holtermann sought out a new and more secure location to organize the troops. The choice fell on Ingstadkleiva Fort near the village of Hegra in the Stjørdalen valley – a fort placed in reserve in 1926, but still largely intact and defensible. The mountain border fort was soon to become internationally known as Hegra Fortress.

=== Hegra Fortress ===
At Hegra Holtermann organised an improvised force of 250 soldiers and one female volunteer auxiliary with the intention to resist the invaders until effective support could arrive from elsewhere. As the tide of war developed unfavorably for the Norwegian forces in the south of Norway major Holtermann made it his main mission to hold the fort until the expected allied thrust from the north reached his area of operation. From its strategic location Hegra Fortress could have played an important role as a junction for the allied offensive. Holtermann also proposed plans to attempt to bombard the German airfields near Trondheim. However, since the artillery pieces at the fortress were intended to fire eastwards towards Sweden, not westwards towards Trondheim, the guns at Holtermann's disposal could not reach the German held air strips. Attempts were made by the besieged garrison to acquire the tools needed to reconfigure the fixed artillery pieces, but without success. For twenty-five days Holtermann and his small force held out under continuous artillery and Luftwaffe bombardment in what became known as the Battle of Hegra Fortress. In the end the fortress' significance consisted mostly of serving as a morale booster for the Norwegian population in a time of mostly bad news. At 05:15 on 5 May 1940, after resisting a steadily tightening siege for nearly a month, Holtermann met the commander of the local German forces and surrendered his troops as the last commander in the south of Norway.

=== PoW ===
After the surrender at Hegra Holtermann and his soldiers marched into captivity at Berkåk. At Berkåk the Norwegians were set at work to repair road damage caused during fighting several weeks earlier. The time the defenders of Hegra spent as POWs varied somewhat, with the first being released as soon as 17 May 1940. Another group was let go on 22 May and the final few, including Holtermann, set free on 2 June.

== Office manager and resistance fighter ==
Following his release in June 1940 Holtermann did not resign and accept the German occupation of his homeland but quickly became active in the fledgling Norwegian resistance movement. While officially spending the years 1940–1942 working as an office manager for Orkla Metall at Orkanger Holtermann continued resisting the Germans by being secretly active in the resistance movement. In 1942 his illegal activities were finally uncovered by the Germans and he was forced to escape across the border into neutral Sweden.

== Continued service abroad ==
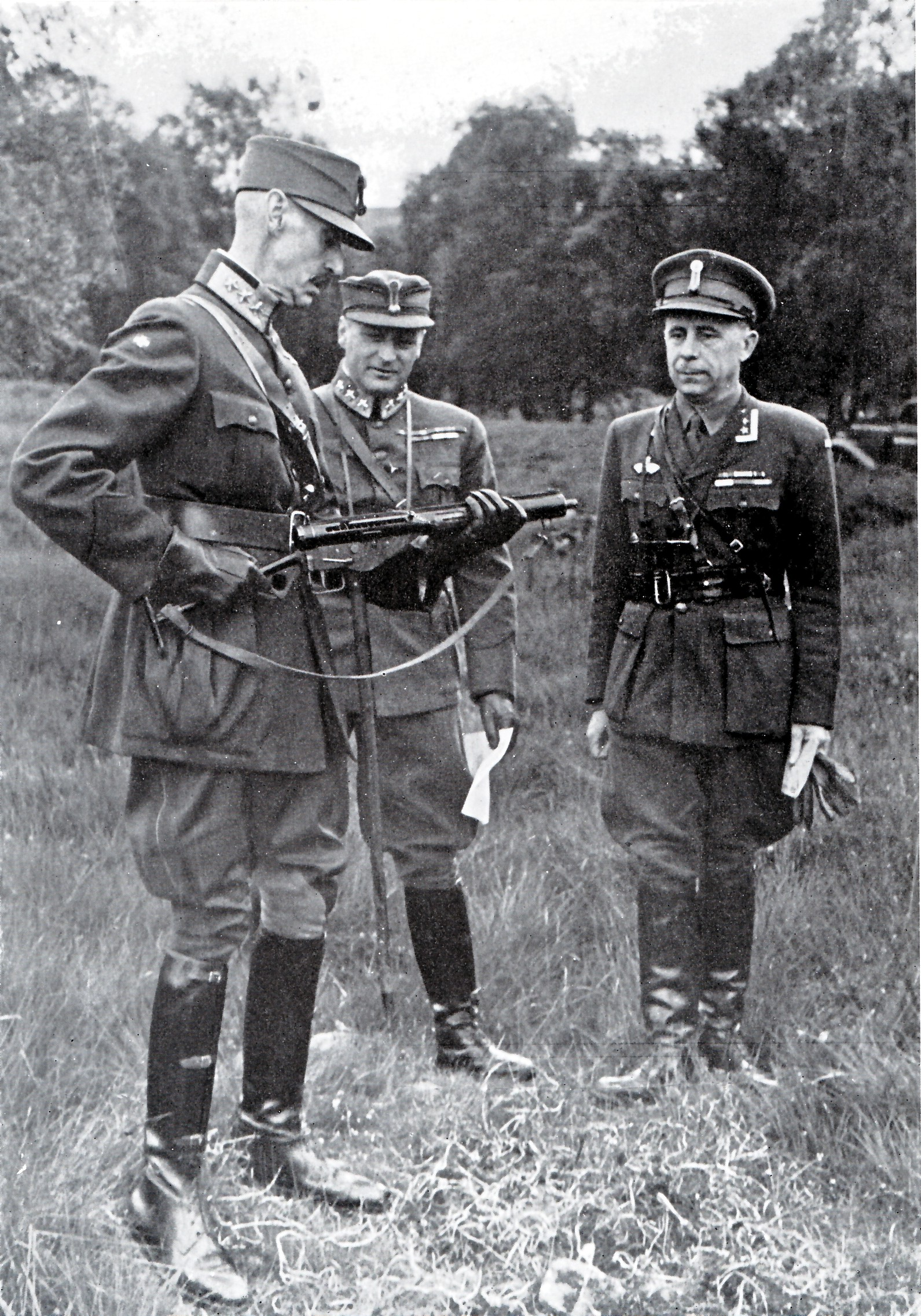
Holtermann (right) with King Haakon VII and Crown Prince Olav in Scotland. Haakon VII is inspecting a Sten gun.

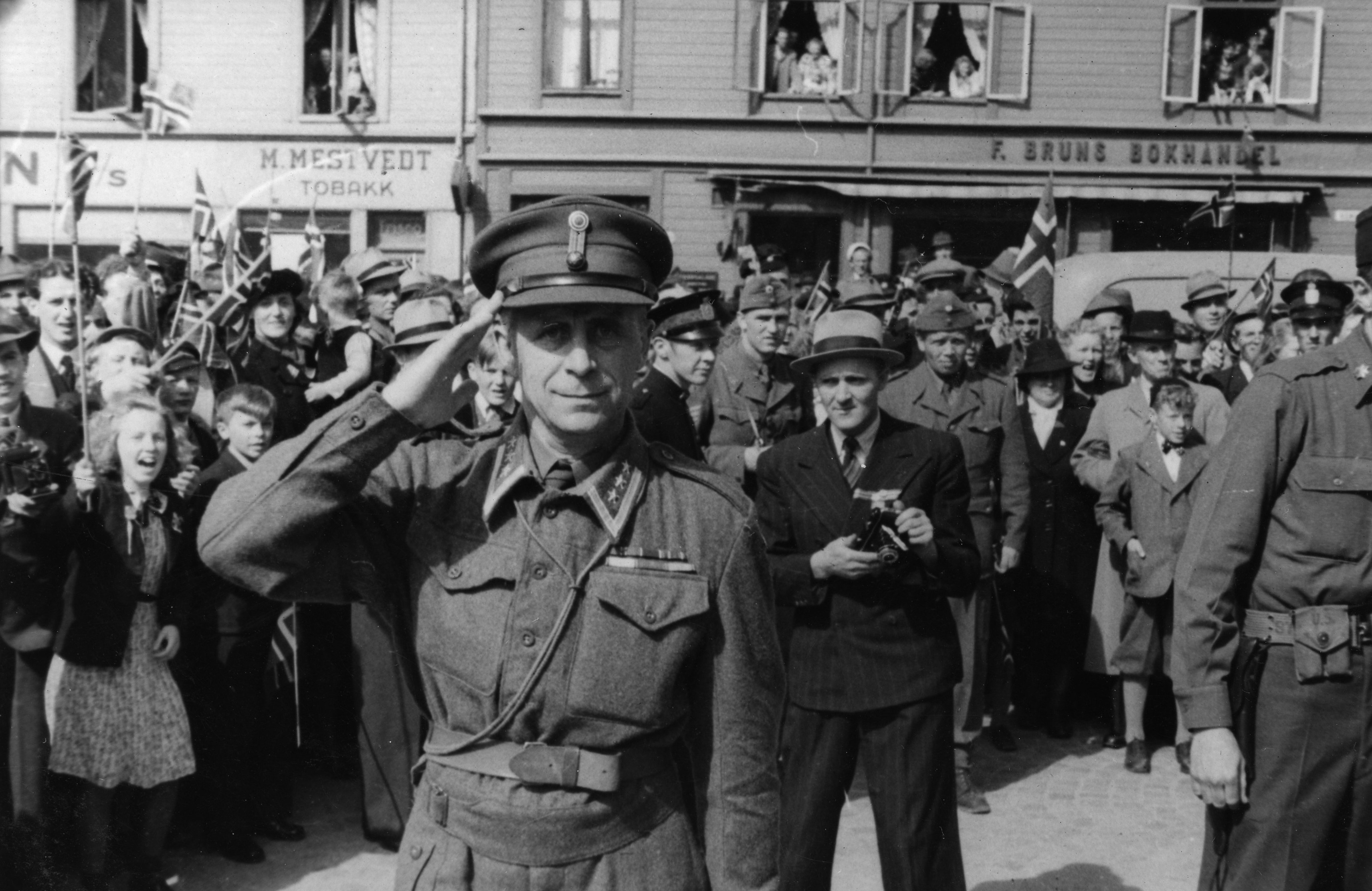
Holtermann in Trondheim during the 1945 Constitution Day celebrations

From Sweden Holtermann made his way to the United Kingdom where, in 1943, he assumed the rank of Oberst (Colonel) and took command of the Norwegian Army in exile's main unit – the Norwegian Brigade in Scotland. In 1944 Holtermann was transferred to lead District Command Trøndelag and returned to Sweden where he took part in Norwegian preparations for the coming liberation of Norway. After the German surrender in Norway on 8 May 1945 Oberst Holtermann led District Command Trøndelag over the border from Sweden on 10 May, together with two reinforced battalions of 2,570 Norwegian police troops, and took part in the disarmament and internment of the German occupation forces.

== Post-war ==
After the war Holtermann spent the first five years in Norway. He first commanded the army artillery in 1946–1948, leading the rebuilding of that Combat Arm in terms of training, methods and materiel. Holtermann then moved on to command the army in North Norway (1949–1950). From 1 November 1950 to 30 April 1952 Holtermann, now with the rank of generalmajor (Major General), took part in the occupation of Germany as the penultimate commander of the Independent Norwegian Brigade Group in Germany. After returning home once more Holtermann spent his last years in the active army as Army Staff Commander and Commander of Allied Land Forces in Southern Norway before leaving the army in 1956. After ending his military service, Holtermann worked on as the leader of the Norwegian Civil Defence forces between 1956 and 1962.

== Honours ==
By 1930, Holtermann had been made a Chevalier of the French Legion of Honour. In the post-war years Holtermann received numerous medals and orders from both Norway and abroad, the most prestigious being the War Cross with sword (awarded in 1942) and the title of first Knight, First Class of the Royal Norwegian Order of St Olav (awarded in 1956). When Generalmajor Holtermann died in 1966 after just four years of retirement he was given a state funeral on 1 December 1966. In 1991 a statue of Holtermann was unveiled at Hegra Fortress by King Harald V of Norway.

=== War Cross citation ===
In the citation to the award of the War Cross with sword to Hans Reidar Holtermann the Norwegian Army High Command wrote:

The defence of Hegra Fort in Stjørdalen by the Lieutenant Colonel is one of the actions from the Campaign of 1940 that has become best known and attracted the greatest amount of interest. I have myself had the opportunity in Norway to read the Lieutenant Colonel's concise, level headed and objective report, and through it gained a strong impression of that his efforts must be seen as a military accomplishment of the greatest order. His gathering of forces at Værnes in the confused conditions of the first day of war and his reactivation of the snow-covered Hegra Fort – which had been placed in reserve – testifies strongly of his clarity of mind and forceful energy. And the continued defence – which was only given up when the other forces in Southern Norway had been forced to cease fighting and after the fort had run completely out of food – shows the Lieutenant Colonel as a strong and forceful leader with the distinctive command abilities that are always such a deciding factor with regard to the defence of surrounded fortresses.

== Bibliography ==
- Arnstad, Johan (1965). Beleiringen av Hegra Festning 10. april – 5. mai 1940 (in Norwegian). Trondheim: F. Bruns bokforhandels forlag.
- Brox, Karl H. (1988). Kampen om Hegra – festningen tyskerne ikke greide å ta (in Norwegian). Oslo: Gyldendal Norsk Forlag. ISBN 82-05-17716-3.
- Soldat 31358-38 (1985). Rapport fra Hegra Fort (in Norwegian). Trondheim: Foreningen Hegra 1940.
- Zeiner-Gundersen, Herman Fredrik (1986). Norsk artilleri gjennom 300 år (in Norwegian). Arendal: Agdin Forlag. ISBN 82-7360-003-3.
