= Allied Forces North Norway =

NATO command defending Norway

- Active: 1952 - 1994
- Part of: Allied Forces Northern Europe, Kolsås, Norway
- Location: Bodø, Norway

Allied Forces North Norway (NON) was a NATO command tasked with the defense of Northern Norway. NON's area of responsibility covered the three northernmost counties of Norway: Nordland, Troms and Finnmark, as well as the adjacent sea territory. It formed part of Allied Forces Northern Europe.

== History ==
Allied Forces North Norway (NON) was activated in 1962 along with Allied Forces South Norway (SONOR) and Allied Forces Baltic Approaches. Unlike most other NATO commands NON was a staffed entirely by members of the Norwegian Armed Forces. Its operational headquarters was located in a bunker at Reitan, which today is used as the Norwegian Joint Headquarters. The commander of NON had three deputies: Commander Land Forces North Norway, Commander Air Forces North Norway, and Commander Naval Forces North Norway. Each of the three deputies commanded the Norwegian units of his service branch based in District Command North Norway. Incoming allied units would have come under the command of these three deputy commanders.

== Structure in 1989 ==
NON had the following units at its disposal to fight an attack by the Soviet Union's 6th Army:

- Allied Forces North Norway (NON), commanded by a Norwegian lieutenant general:

=== Commander Naval Forces North Norway ===
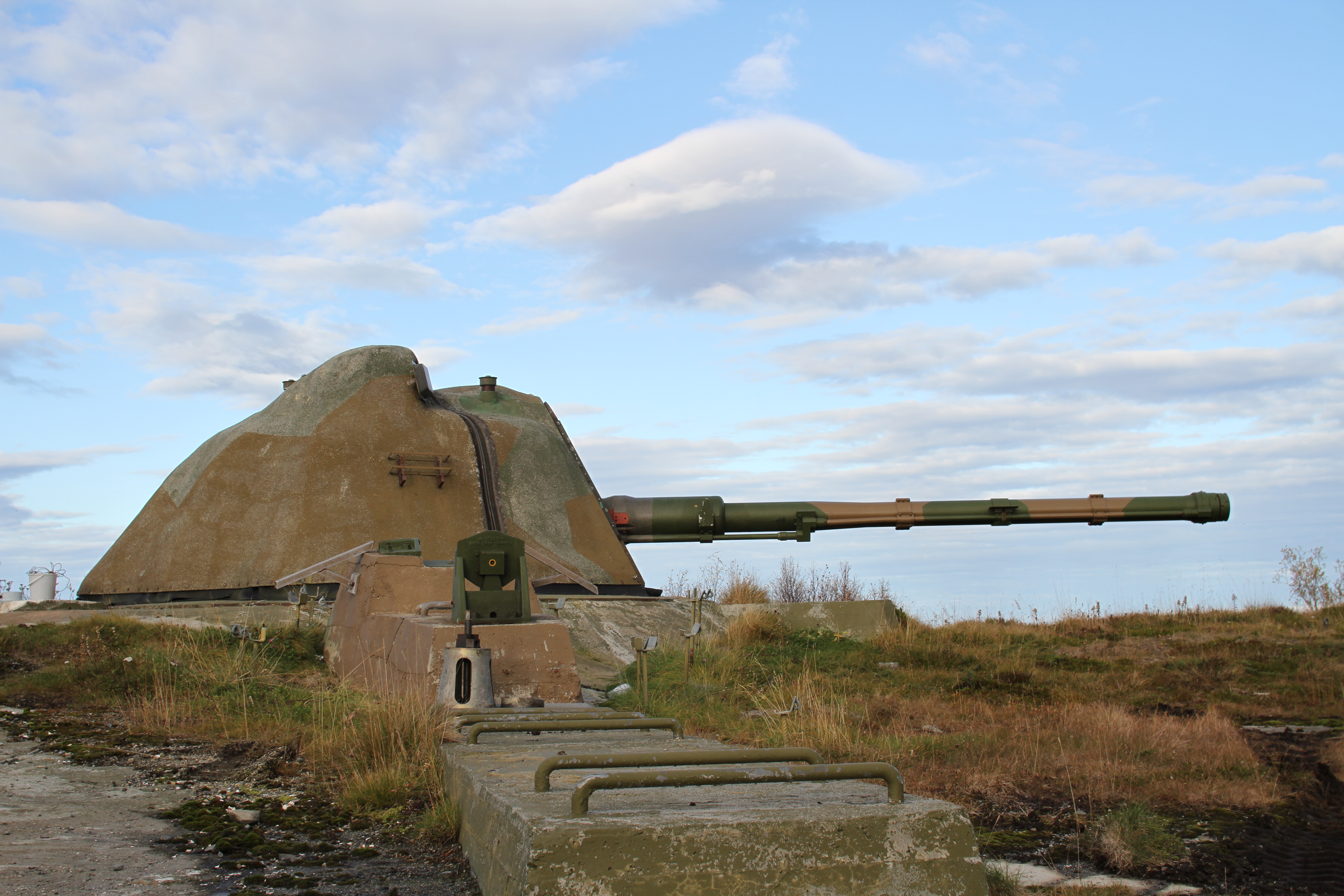
Meløyvær Fortress 120mm Tornautomatpjäs m/70 automatic gun

Naval Forces North Norway (NAVNON) was tasked with the defence of Northern Norway's coastal waters against Soviet naval incursions and amphibious landings. Operations in the ocean beyond Norway's coastal waters were under the command of NATO Supreme Allied Commander Atlantic's (SACLANT) Northern Sub-Area Command (NORLANT). Therefore NAVNON consisted of coastal artillery units and one fast attack craft squadron. The boats for the fast attack craft squadron were dispatched from units in Southern Norway on a rotational basis.

- Commander Naval Forces North Norway (NAVNON), commanded by a Norwegian rear admiral:
  - Olavsvern Naval Base near Tromsø
    - 22nd Fast Attack Craft Squadron
  - Ramsund Naval Base near Narvik
  - Sortland Naval Base in Sortland
  - Coastal Artillery
    - Nordland county:
      - Bremnes Fortress in Bodø
      - Ofotfjord defenses to protect Narvik
        - Korshamn Torpedo Battery in Ballangen
        - Porsøy Torpedo Battery in Ballangen
        - Nes Fort in Lødingen with 2x 120mm Tornautomatpjäs m/70 automatic guns
        - Tjeldøy Fort in Tjeldsund
    - Troms county:
      - Andfjorden defenses to protect Harstad
        - Sandsøy Fort on Sandsøya
        - Meløyvær Fortress on Krøttøya with 3x 120mm Tornautomatpjäs m/70 automatic guns
        - Skrolsvik Fort in Skrollsvika
        - Trondenes Fort in Harstad
        - Grøtavær Fort on Grytøya
        - Stangnes Fort in Harstad
      - Malangen Fjord and Gisundet defenses, covering the Northern entry of the Andfjorden
        - Malangen Torpedo Battery in Tennskjær
        - Rødbergodden Fort in Aglapsvik
        - Gibostad Fort in Gibostad
        - Skorliodden Fort in Vangshamn
      - Tromsø defenses
        - Grøtsund Fort covering the Northern side of Tromsø
        - Breiviknes Fort in Ramfjordbotn with 3x 75mm Tornpjäs m/57 automatic guns covering the Northern entry of the Grøtsundet and the Ullsfjorden
        - Årøybukt Fort in Lyngseidet with 3x 75mm Tornpjäs m/57 automatic guns to defend the Lyngenfjord

=== Commander Air Forces North Norway ===
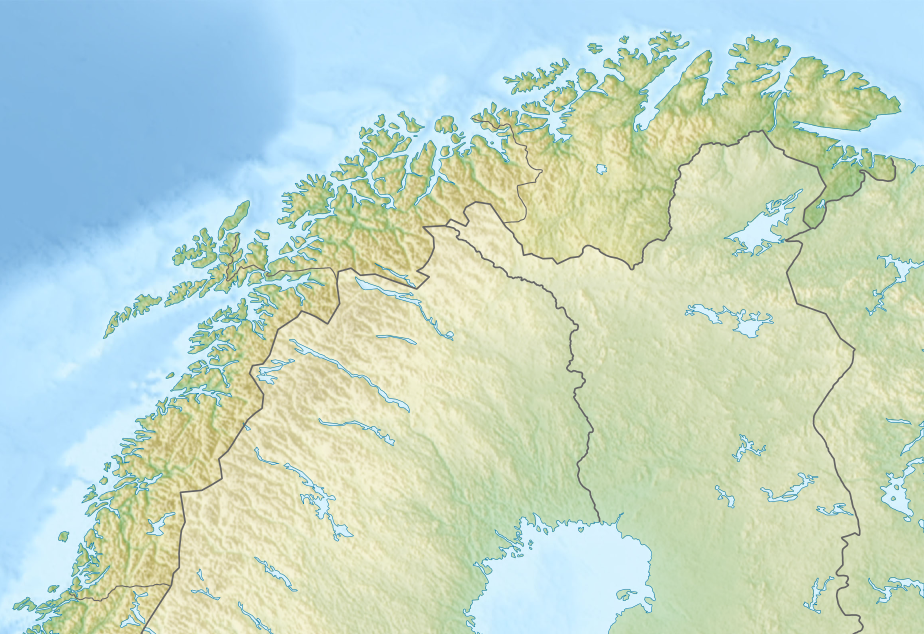
Norwegian Air Force bases in Northern Norway

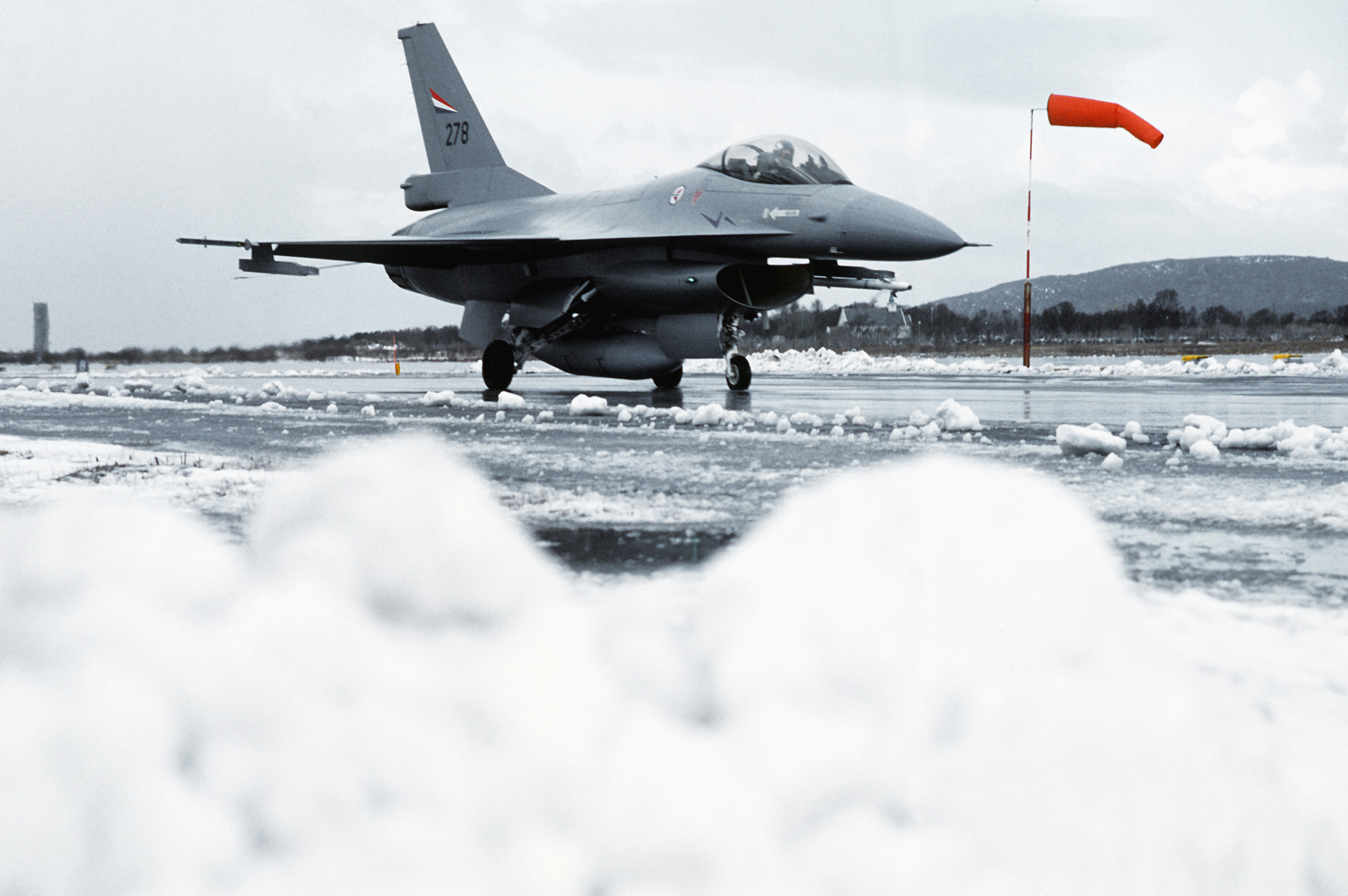
A F-16A Fighting Falcon prepares to take off at Bodø Air Station during the exercise Alloy Express in 1982.

- Commander Air Forces North Norway (AIRNON), commanded by a Norwegian major general:
  - Control and Reporting Centre Sørreisa managed by the 131st Air Wing
  - Bodø Air Station
    - 132nd Air Wing
      - 331st Fighter/Bomber Squadron with 18x F-16A
      - 334th Fighter/Bomber Squadron with 18x F-16A
      - 719th Transport Squadron with 3x DHC-6 Twin Otter and 6x UH-1B
      - Norwegian Adapted Hawk air-defense battery with 3x Hawk launchers and 3x 40 mm L/70 radar-guided anti-aircraft guns
      - Search and Rescue Detachment from the 330th Helicopter Squadron with 2x Sea King Mk43
  - Bardufoss Air Station
    - 139th Air Wing
      - 337th Helicopter Squadron with 6x Lynx Mk.86
      - 339th Helicopter Squadron with 12x Bell 412
      - Norwegian Adapted Hawk air-defense battery with 3x Hawk launchers and 3x 40mm L/70 radar-guided anti-aircraft guns
  - Andøya Air Station
    - 133rd Air Wing
      - 333rd Squadron with 6x P-3C Orion
      - Norwegian Adapted Hawk air-defense battery with 3x Hawk launchers and 3x 40mm L/70 radar-guided anti-aircraft guns
  - Banak Air Station
    - Search and Rescue Detachment from the 330th Helicopter Squadron with 2x Sea King Mk43
  - Norwegian Adapted Hawk air-defense battery with 3x Hawk launchers and 3x 40mm L/70 radar-guided anti-aircraft guns at Evenes Air Station to defend the vital airport and harbor at Narvik

=== Commander Land Forces North Norway ===
Norwegian military garrisons in Troms county
Norwegian military garrisons in Finnmark county

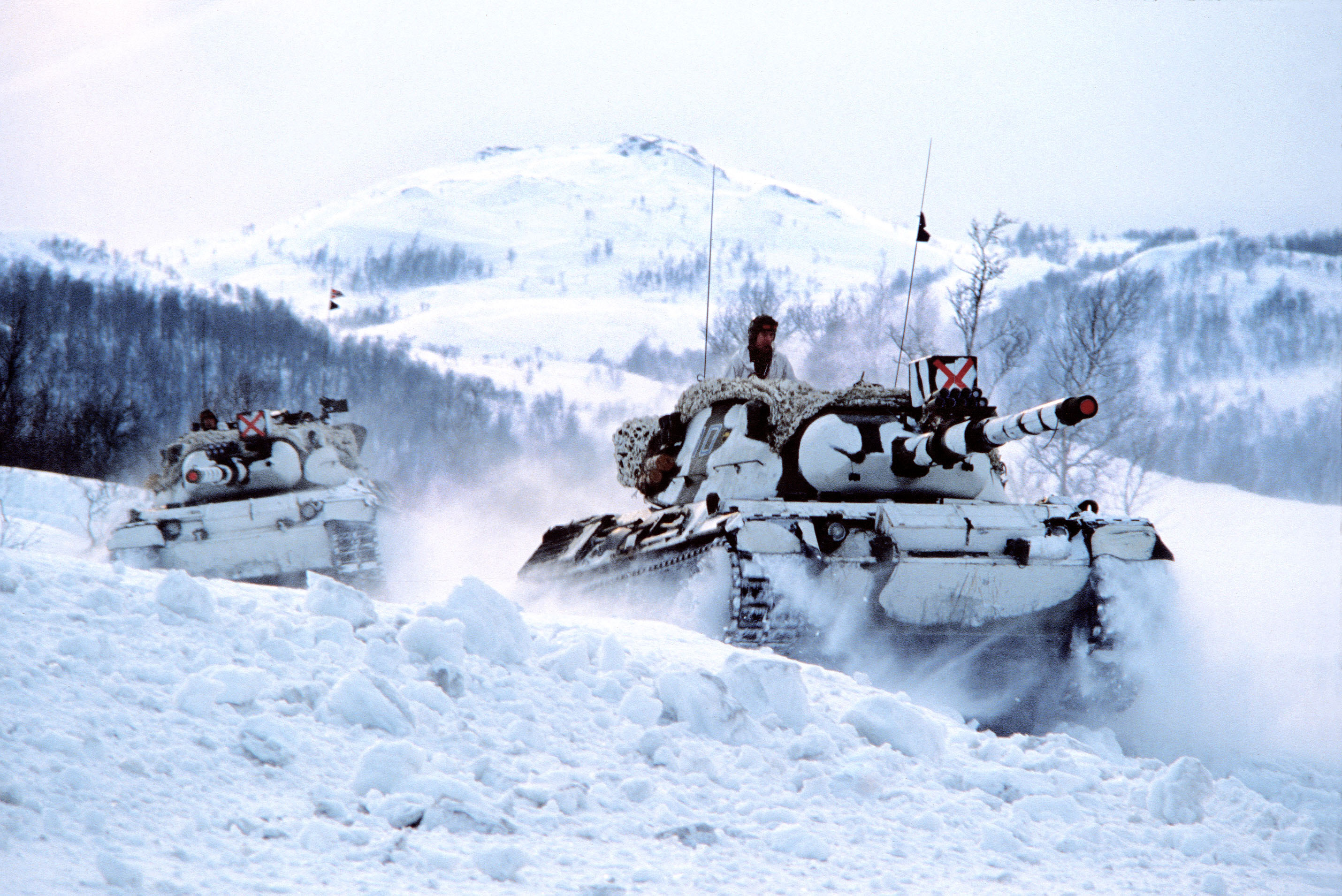
Norwegian Leopard 1 tanks in Northern Norway in 1982

- Commander Land Forces North Norway (LANDNON), commanded by a Norwegian major general:
  - 6th Division in Harstad
    - Brigade North Norway in Bardufoss (Active unit)
      - Brigade Staff Company in Heggelia
      - 1st Armored Infantry Battalion in Setermoen with 26 Leopard 1 tanks, 29x NM135 infantry fighting vehicles
      - 2nd Infantry Battalion in Øverbygd with Bandvagn 206, 4x NM142 ATGM carriers and 4x M106 mortar carriers
      - 3rd Infantry Battalion in Harstad with Bandvagn 206, 4x NM142 ATGM carriers and 4x M106 mortar carriers
      - Field Artillery Battalion in Setermoen with 18x M109G 155 mm self-propelled howitzers
      - Reconnaissance Squadron in Øverbygd with 3x NM135 infantry fighting vehicles
      - Anti-tank Missile Company in Setermoen with 4x NM142 ATGM carriers and 4x NM116 light tanks
      - Anti-Aircraft Battery in Heggelia with 6x NM195 anti-air missile vehicles and 6x 40 mm L/60 anti-aircraft guns
      - Engineer Company in Øverbygd
      - Mounted Squadron in Øverbygd with pack horses
      - Signal Company in Heggelia
      - Supply Company in Heggelia
      - Transport Company in Heggelia
      - Maintenance Company in Heggelia
      - Medical Company in Setermoen
      - Artillery Observation Platoon in Setermoen with 2x Cessna O-1A planes
      - Military Police Platoon in Heggelia
    - Brigade 14 (Norwegian Home Guard District 14 mobilization unit) in Mosjøen
      - 1st Infantry Battalion with Bandvagn 206, 4x TOW ATGM missile launchers and 4x M30 107 mm mortars
      - 2nd Infantry Battalion with Bandvagn 206, 4x TOW ATGM missile launchers and 4x M30 107mm mortars
      - 3rd Infantry Battalion with Bandvagn 206, 4x TOW ATGM missile launchers and 4x M30 107mm mortars
      - Field Artillery Battalion with 24x M109G 155mm self-propelled howitzers
      - Reconnaissance Squadron with 3x NM135 infantry fighting vehicles
      - Anti-tank Missile Company with 4x NM142 ATGM carriers and 4x NM116 light tanks
      - Anti-Aircraft Battery with 6x RBS 70 man-portable air-defense systems and 6x 40 mm L/60 anti-aircraft guns
      - Engineer Company
    - Brigade 15 (Norwegian Home Guard District 15 and Norwegian Home Guard District 16 mobilization unit) in Bardu
      - 1st Infantry Battalion with Bandvagn 206, 4x TOW ATGM missile launchers and 4x M30 107mm mortars
      - 2nd Infantry Battalion with Bandvagn 206, 4x TOW ATGM missile launchers and 4x M30 107mm mortars
      - 3rd Infantry Battalion with Bandvagn 206, 4x TOW ATGM missile launchers and 4x M30 107mm mortars
      - Field Artillery Battalion with 18x M109G 155mm self-propelled howitzers
      - Reconnaissance Squadron with 3x NM135 infantry fighting vehicles
      - Anti-tank Missile Company with 4x NM142 ATGM carriers and 4x NM116 light tanks
      - Anti-Aircraft Battery with 6x RBS 70 man-portable air-defense systems and 6x 40 mm L/60 anti-aircraft guns
      - Engineer Company
  - Garnisonen i Sør-Varanger (Active unit based at the Soviet-Norwegian border) in Høybuktmoen
    - Varanger Infantry Battalion with Bandvagn 206, 4x TOW ATGM missile launchers and 4x M30 107mm mortars
    - Artillery Battery with 6x M109G 155mm self-propelled howitzers
  - Garnisonen i Porsanger (Active unit) in Porsangmoen
    - Porsanger Infantry Battalion with Bandvagn 206, 4x TOW ATGM missile launchers and 4x M30 107mm mortars
    - Tank Company with 13x Leopard 1 tanks
    - Artillery Battery with 6x M109G 155mm self-propelled howitzers
  - Hålogaland Engineer Battalion
  - Hålogaland Signal Battalion
  - Hålogaland Medical Battalion
  - Bjerkvik Maintenance Workshop
  - Norwegian Home Guard District 14 Sør-Hålogaland – Mosjøen and Vefsn (Home Guard in Southern Nordland)
  - Norwegian Home Guard District 15 Nord-Hålogaland in Elvegårdsmoen and Bjerkvik (Home Guard in Northern Nordland)
  - Norwegian Home Guard District 16 Troms in Bardu (Home Guard in Troms)
  - Norwegian Home Guard District 17 Vest-Finnmark in Alta (Home Guard in Western Finnmark county)
    - Alta Infantry Battalion with Bandvagn 206, 4x TOW ATGM missile launchers and 4x M30 107 mm mortars
    - Artillery Battery with 6x M109G 155mm self-propelled howitzers
  - Norwegian Home Guard District 18 Øst-Finnmark in Høybuktmoen (Home Guard in Eastern Finnmark)
    - Infantry Battalion with Bandvagn 206, 4x TOW ATGM missile launchers and 4x M30 107mm mortars

=== Reinforcements ===
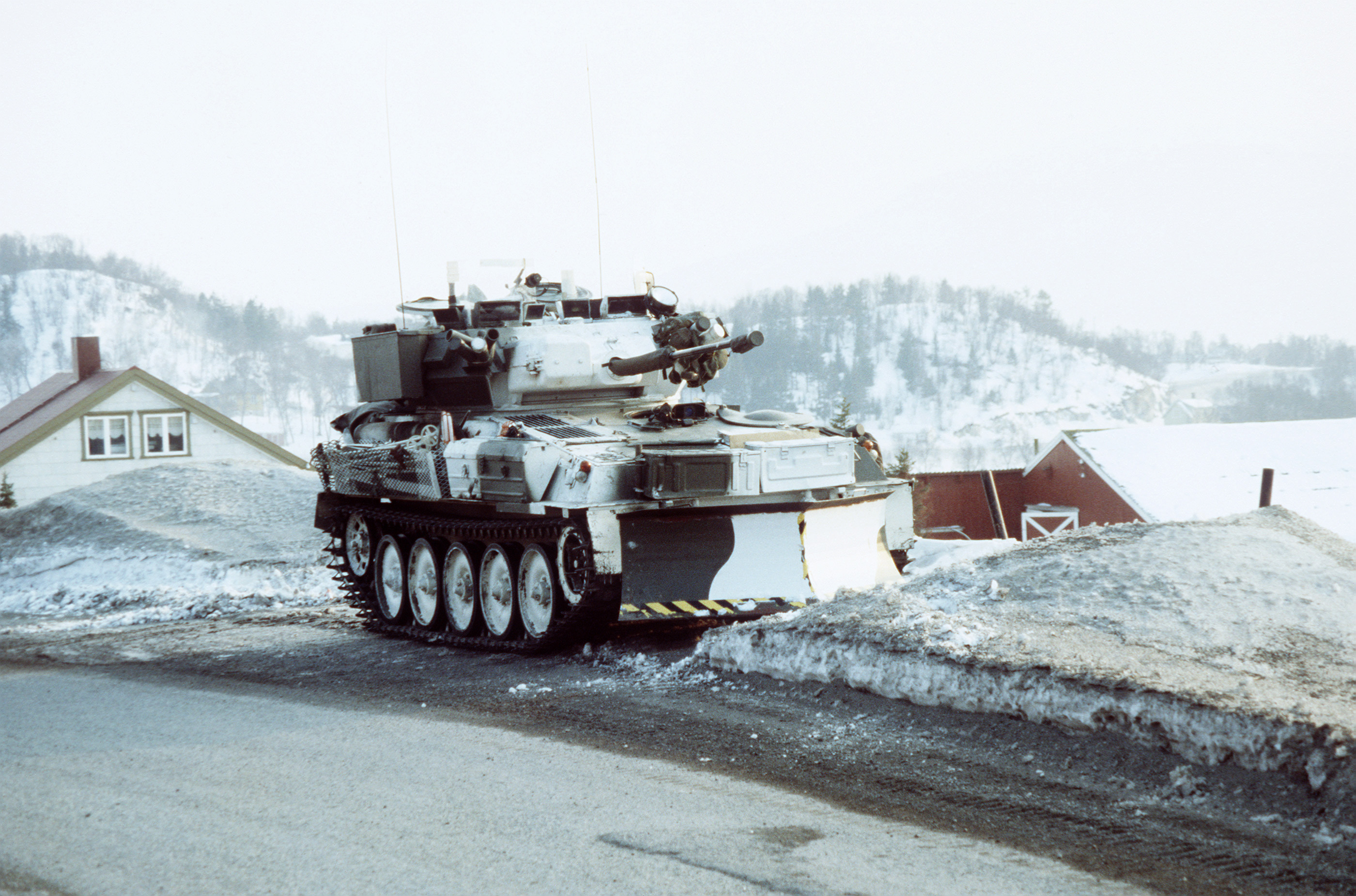
A British Army Scimitar reconnaissance vehicle during exercise COLD WINTER '87 in Norway

NON would have been reinforced by the following Norwegian units from Allied Forces South Norway:

- Brigade 5 (Norwegian Home Guard District 5 mobilization unit) in Terningmoen in Eastern Norway, equipment pre-positioned in Northern Norway
  - 1st Infantry Battalion
  - 2nd Infantry Battalion
  - 3rd Infantry Battalion
  - Field Artillery Battalion with M109G 155mm self-propelled howitzers
  - Reconnaissance Squadron
  - Anti-tank Missile Company
  - Anti-Aircraft Battery
  - Engineer Company
  - Artillery Observation Platoon with 2x Cessna O-1A planes
- Brigade 6 (Norwegian Home Guard District 6 mobilization unit) in Hønefoss in Eastern Norway, equipment pre-positioned in Northern Norway
  - 1st Infantry Battalion
  - 2nd Infantry Battalion
  - 3rd Infantry Battalion
  - Field Artillery Battalion with M114 155 mm towed howitzers
  - Reconnaissance Squadron

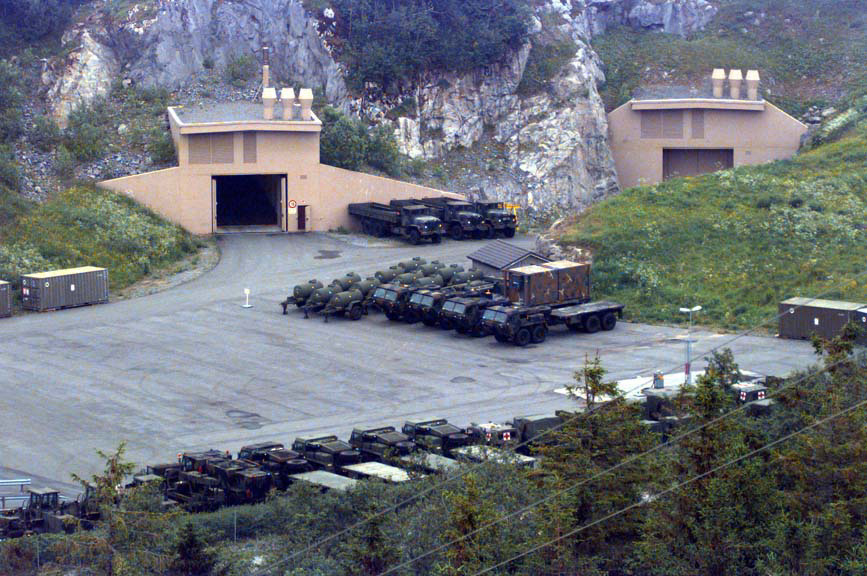
US Marine Corps Norway Air-Landed Marine Expeditionary Brigade (NALMEB) Prepositioning Program material at the Bjugn Cave Facility

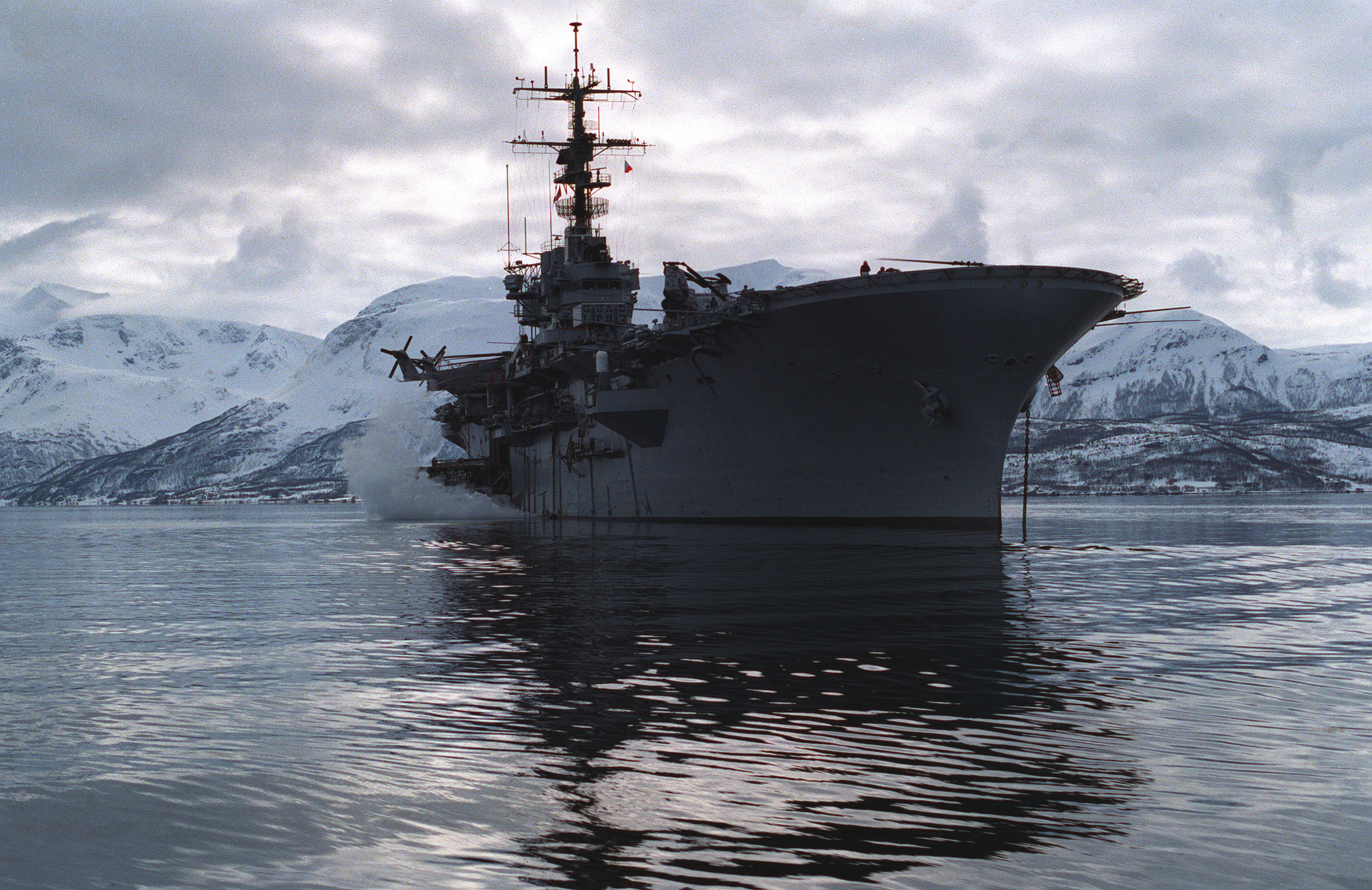
USS Guadalcanal during Exercise Teamwork '92.

NATO would have planned to reinforce Allied Forces North Norway with 2–7 days with the following allied formations:

- Allied Land Forces:
  - Royal Navy: 3 Commando Brigade including 1 Amphibious Combat Group and Whiskey Company of the Netherlands Marine Corps. The brigade trained annually in Northern Norway and had large stores of vehicles and supplies pre-positioned there.
  - U.S. Marine Corps: the 4th Marine Amphibious Brigade of the II Marine Amphibious Force (also known as Norway Air-Landed Marine Expeditionary Brigade (NALMEB)) had its equipment pre-positioned in eight purpose-built caves near the Værnes Air Station in Trondheim in central Norway. The eight caves contained material for 15,000 troops and war stocks for 30 days. Three of the caves held ground equipment, three munitions and two held aviation support equipment for two air defense and two ground attack squadrons, as well as for 75 heavy transport and light support helicopters. Exercise Teamwork, held every two years during the 1980s, practiced reinforcement of Norway. After that point Exercise Battle Griffin was held in 1993 and 1996.
- Allied Air Forces:
  - United States Air Force: eight squadrons
  - Royal Air Force: one squadron

=== U.S. Forces in Northern Norway ===
The US military maintained three small units in Northern Norway.

- United States European Command
  - United States Navy
    - Fleet Hospital Support Facility 8, in Bogen to maintain the stored Fleet Hospital Eight
  - US Coast Guard
    - LORAN-C Transmitting Station Bø, in Bø
    - LORAN-C Transmitting Station Jan Mayen, on Jan Mayen
