= Meløyvær Fortress =

Norwegian Cold-War era coastal fortress

Meløyvær fort
- Krøttøya, Norway
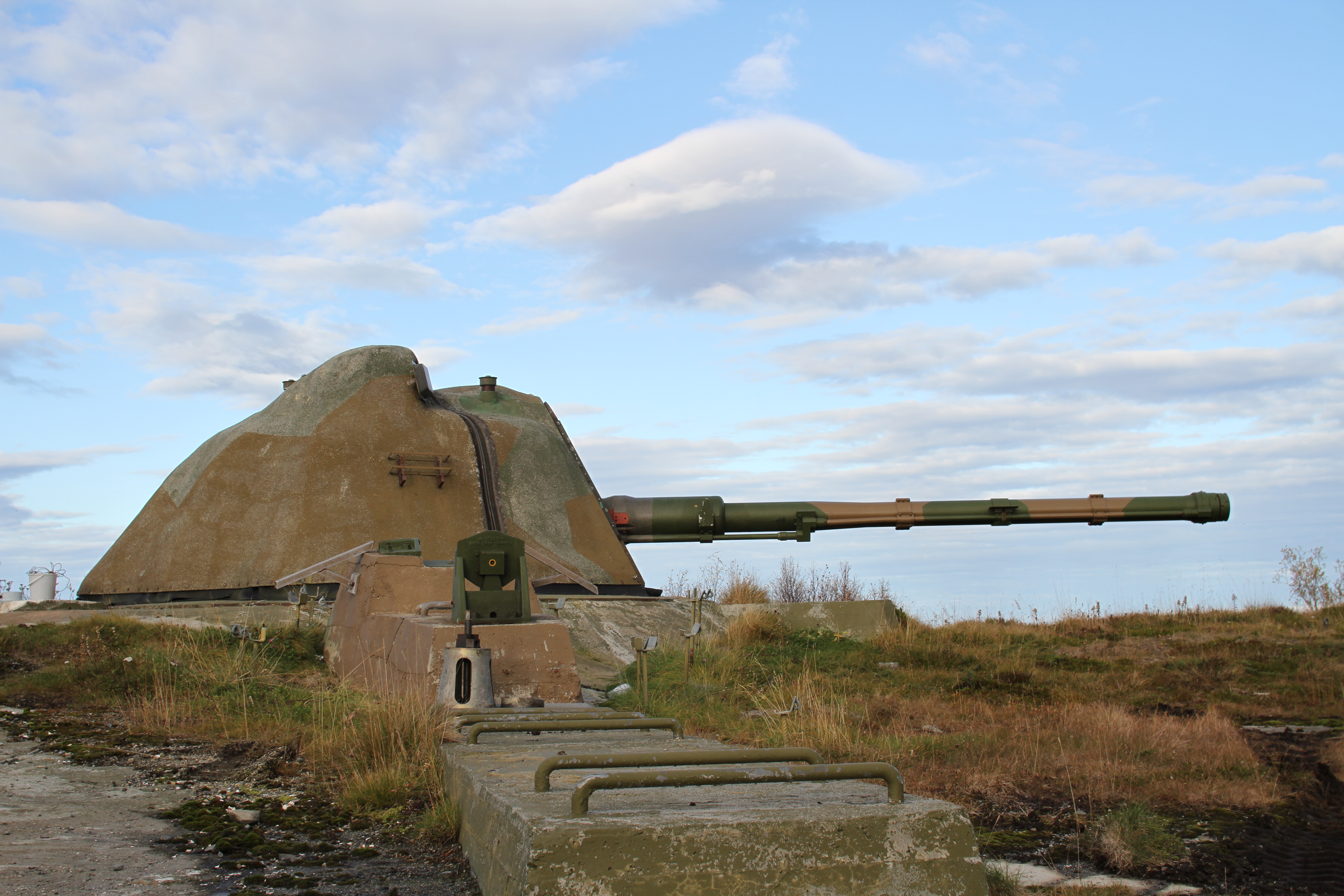
- Meløyvær Fortress Canon B - Russøya (Meløyvær)

Site information
- Type: Military base
- Owner: Norwegian Armed Forces
- Controlled by: Sør-Troms Museum
- Open to the public: Yes
- Condition: Well preserved, Monitored

Location
- Coordinates: 69.0583°N 16.5391°E

Site history
- Built: 1983
- Built by: Norwegian Armed Forces

Meløyvær fortress is a coastal fortress in Norway on Krøttøya in Troms. The construction was of strategic importance to NATO and northern Norway's role during the Cold War. Meløyvær fortress was the last of the fortresses with the 120 mm Bofors guns to be built in Norway. It is a complete construction, authentic and in good condition.

== History ==
Meløyvær fortress was constructed at the end of the 1980s. It was to replace three other coastal fortresses between the islands of Andøya and Senja. Its main purpose was to halt any attacker at the entrance of the Andfjorden. Corresponding coastal artillery was also placed at Nes fortress in Lødingen Municipality and at Kråkvåg in the Trondheimsfjord. Meløyvær fortress was closed down in 2002. The guns were built in a 20 m deep construction which would be self-contained with water and electricity in the event of war. As the construction is so new, all equipment, offices, bedrooms, control room and kitchen etc., is still ready to use. The temperature and climate is monitored to avoid damage to the equipment.

== Guns ==
Meløyvær fortress is the first Norwegian fortresses from the Cold War to be protected in Norway. Originally there were three 120mm Bofors guns, gun A, B and C. Gun A is on Krøttøya and is completely intact. In addition to the gun, control centre D is also fully preserved. Each gun could fire 25 shots per minute to a distance of 27 kilometres (17 mi). Both the gun and the control room has been preserved. There are cups in the kitchen and bedlinen on the bunks. Guns B and C have only the external parts of the gun preserved in position.

The fortress became a protected monument in 2014 and guided tours are offered by Sør-Troms Museum.

== Gallery ==
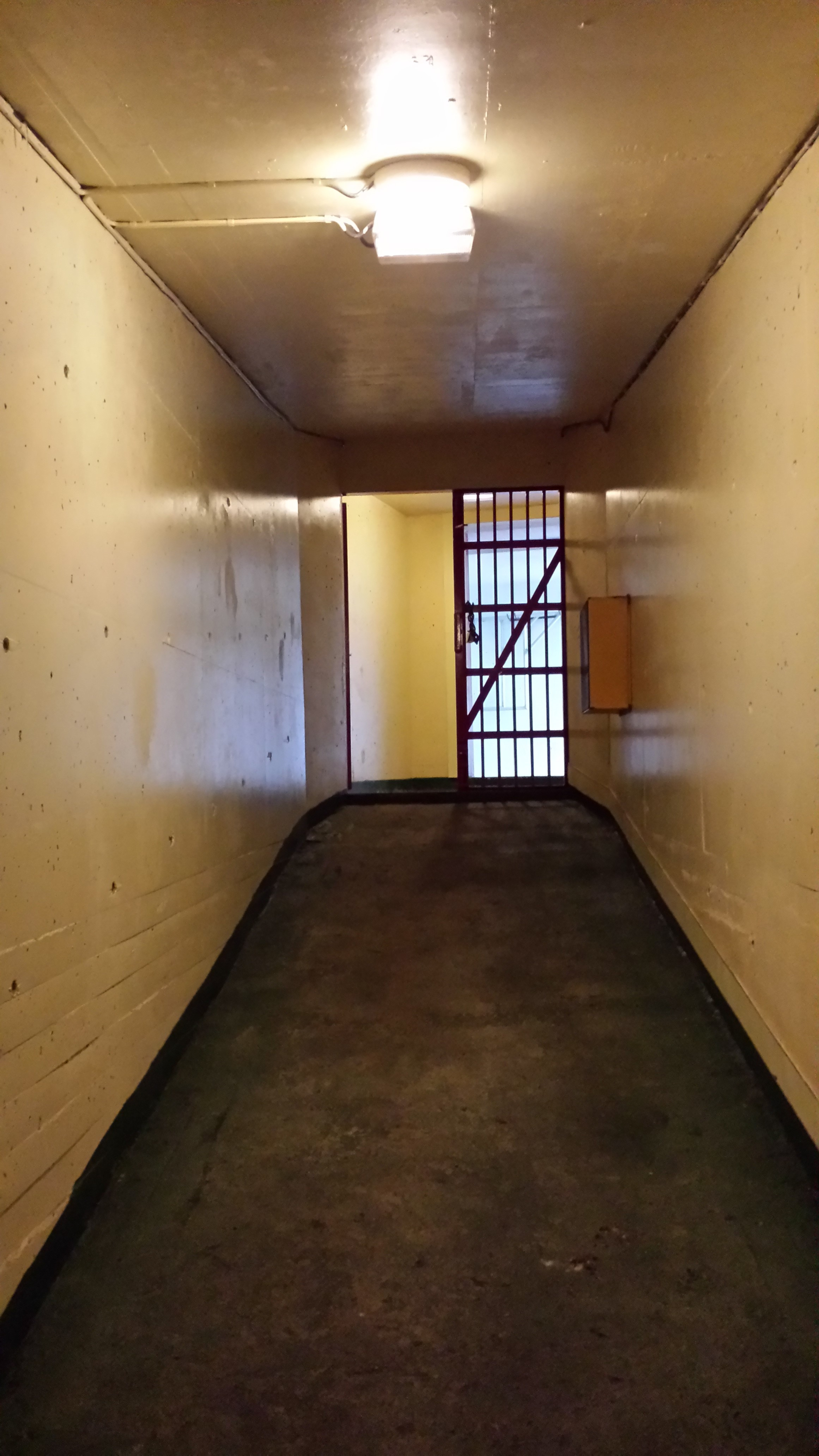
Entrance Corridor - Command Center

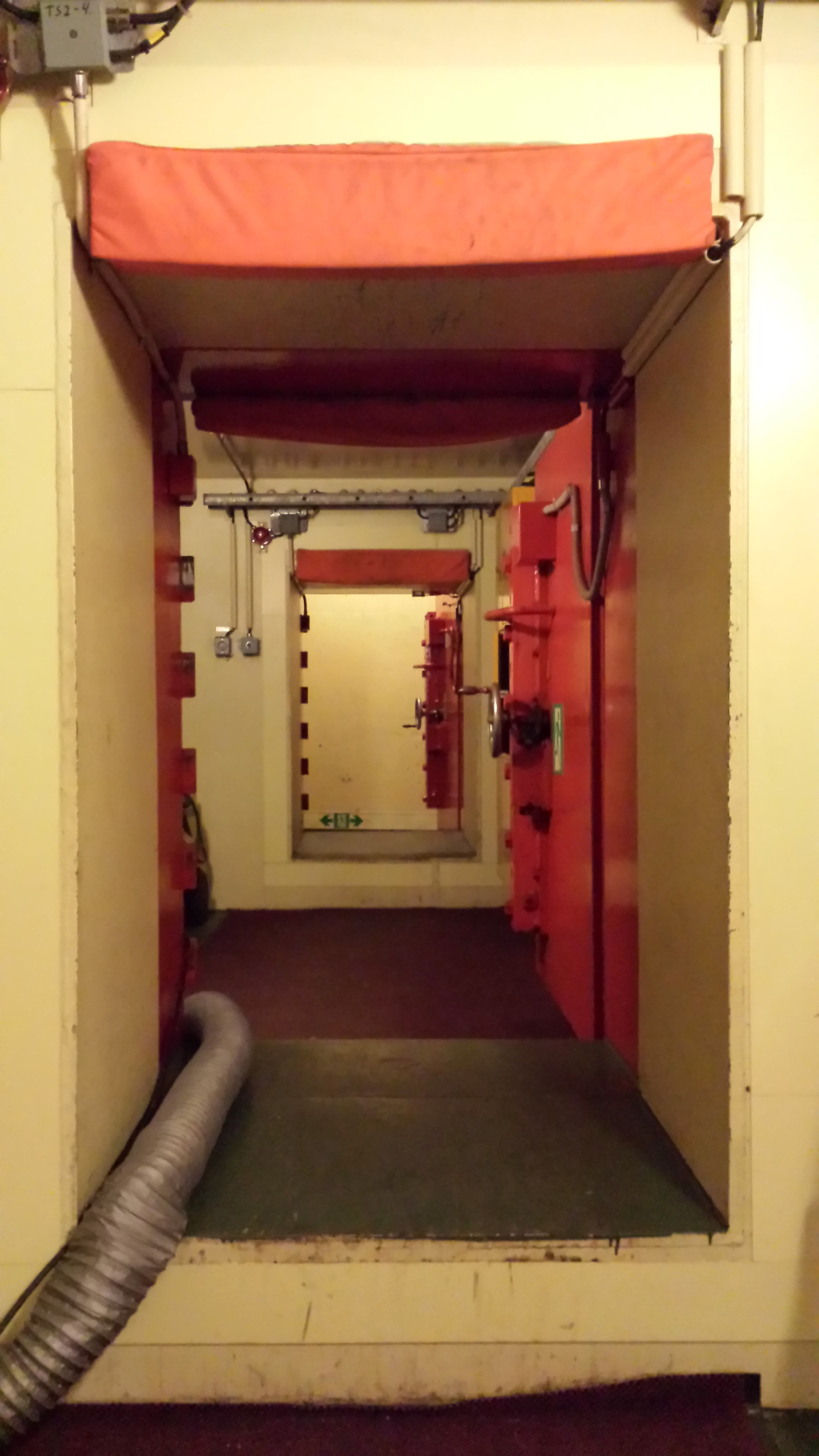
Entrance - Command Center

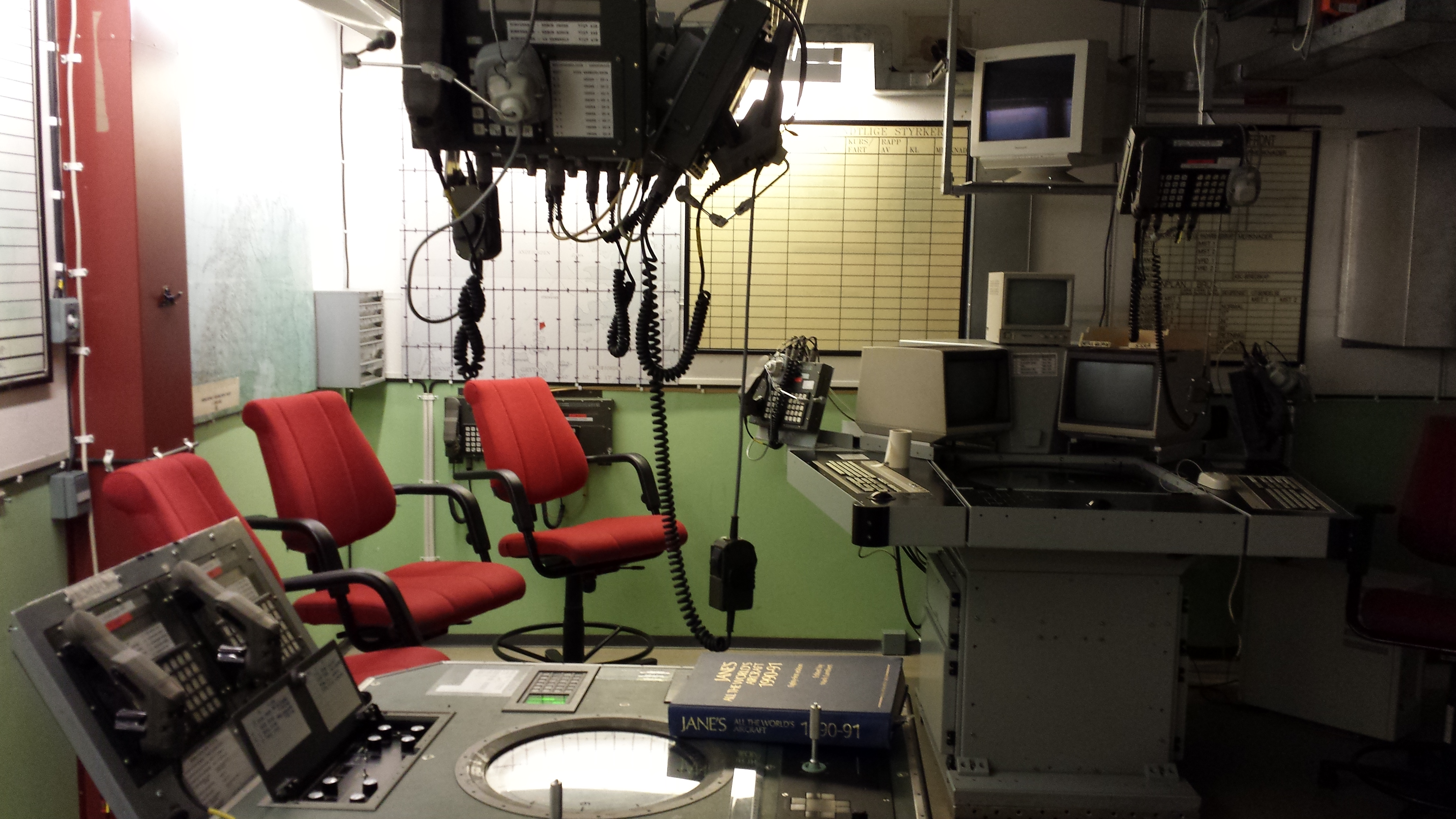
Main Operations Room - Command Center

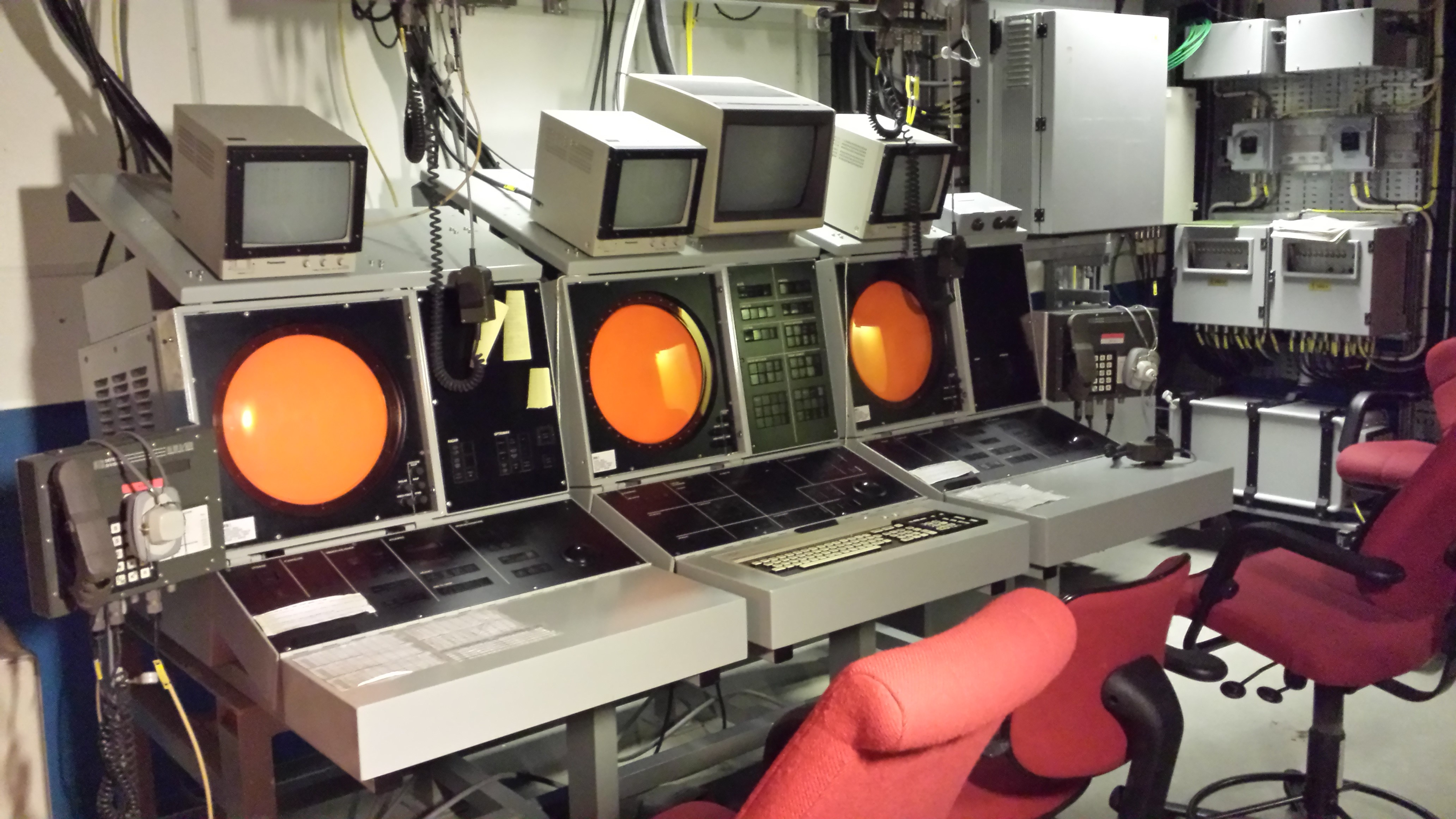
Operations Room for Guns A, B and C - Command Center

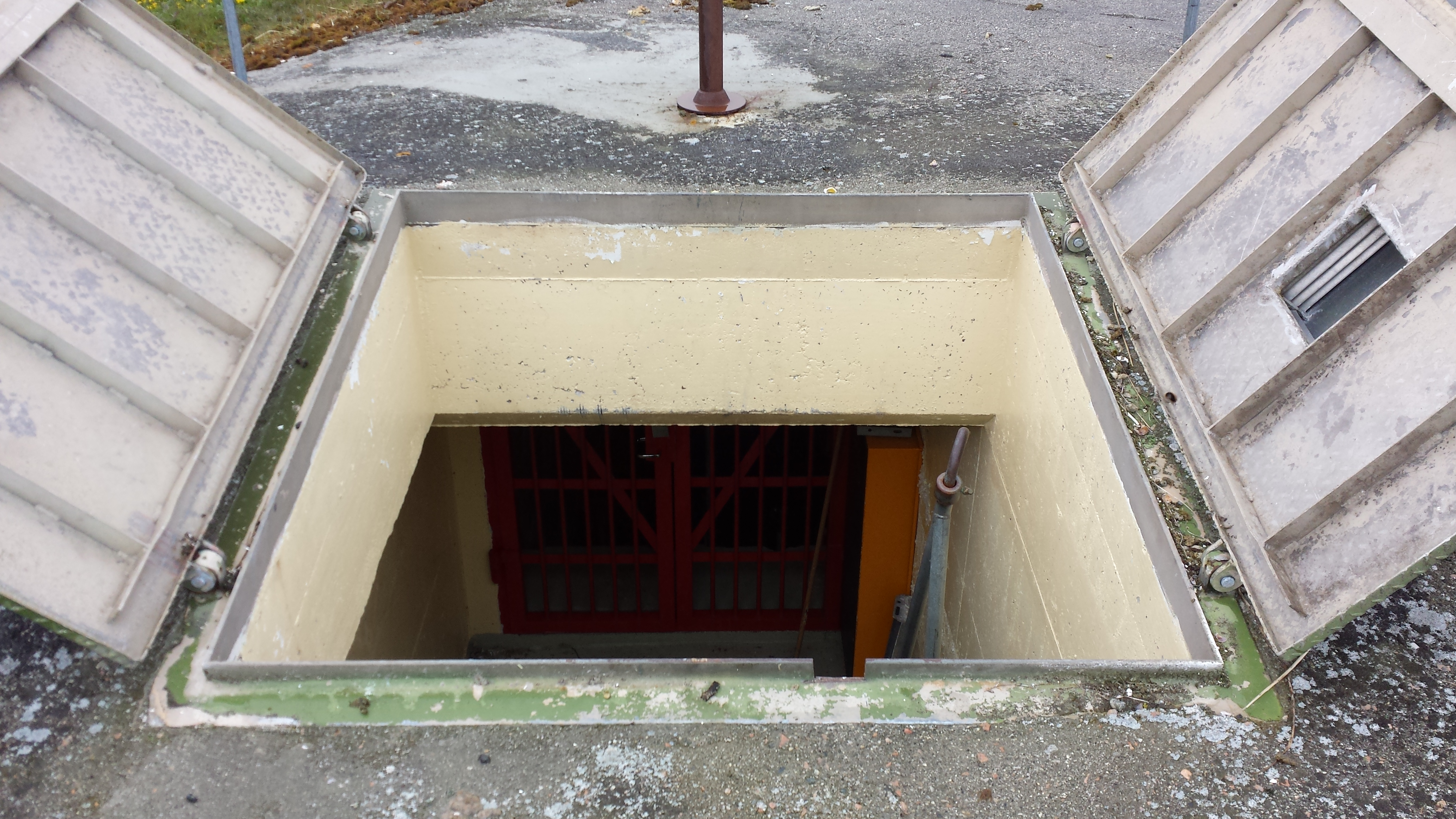
Entrance Corridor - Gun A

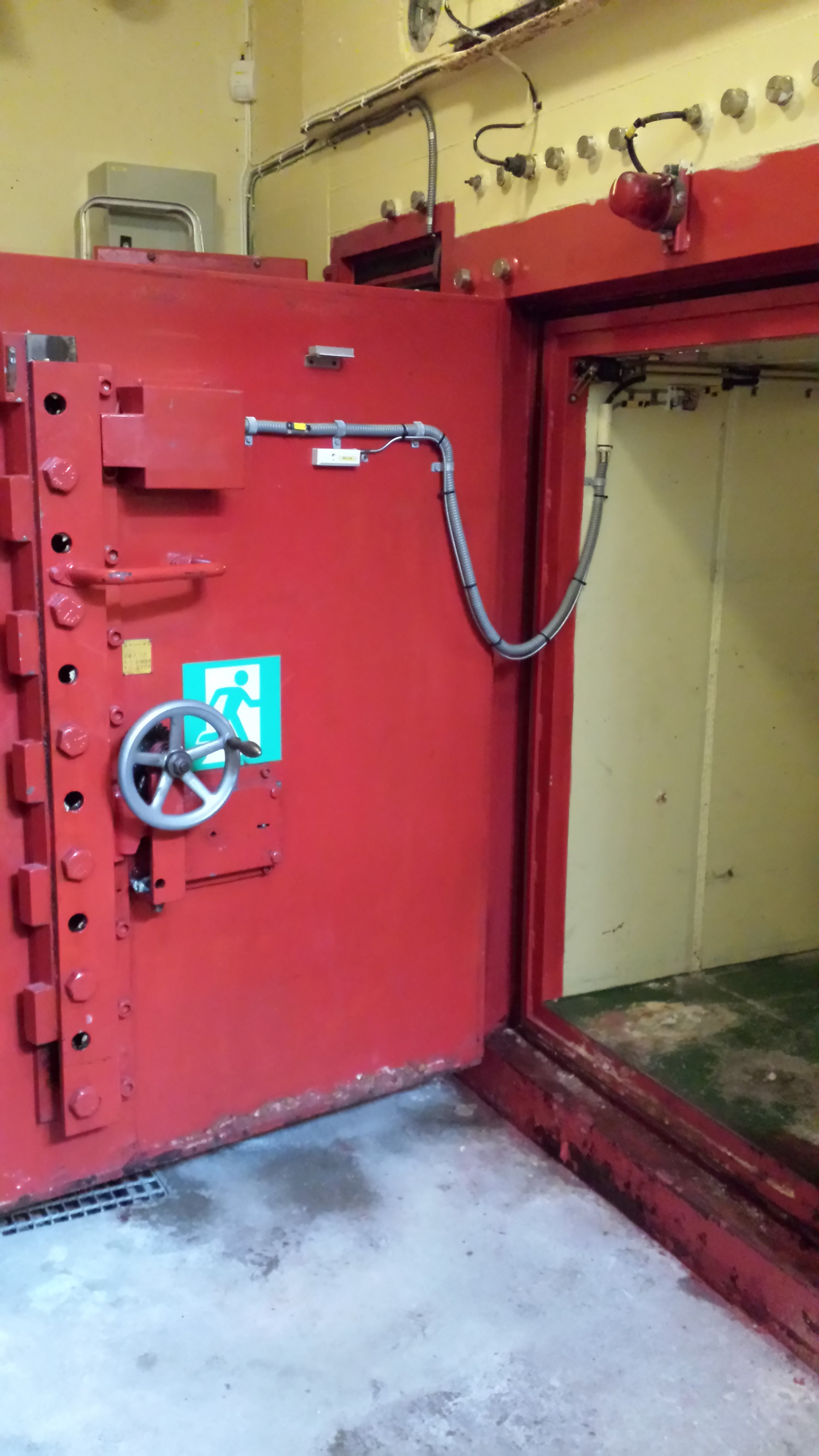
Entrance - Gun A

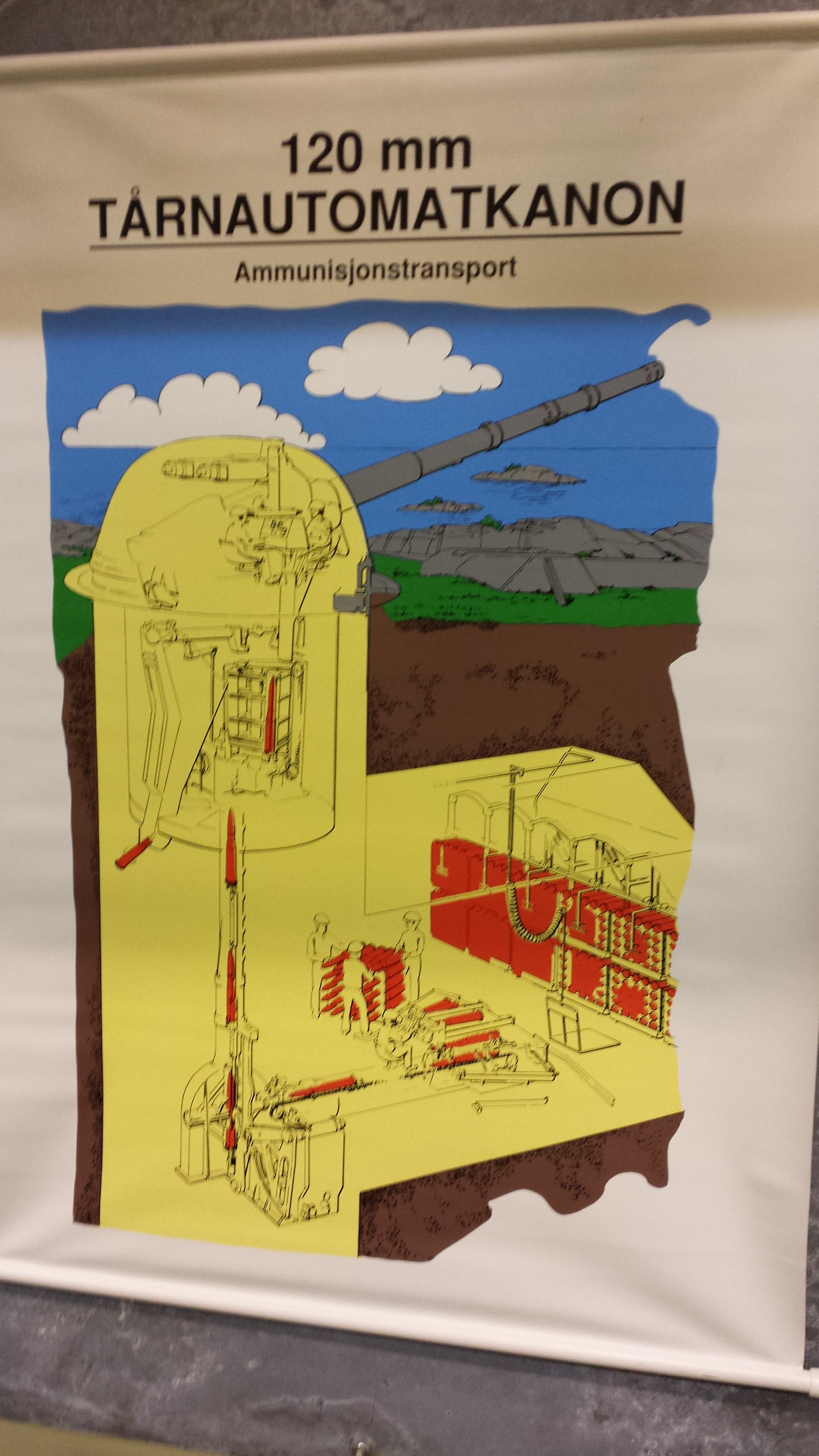
Description of Gun A

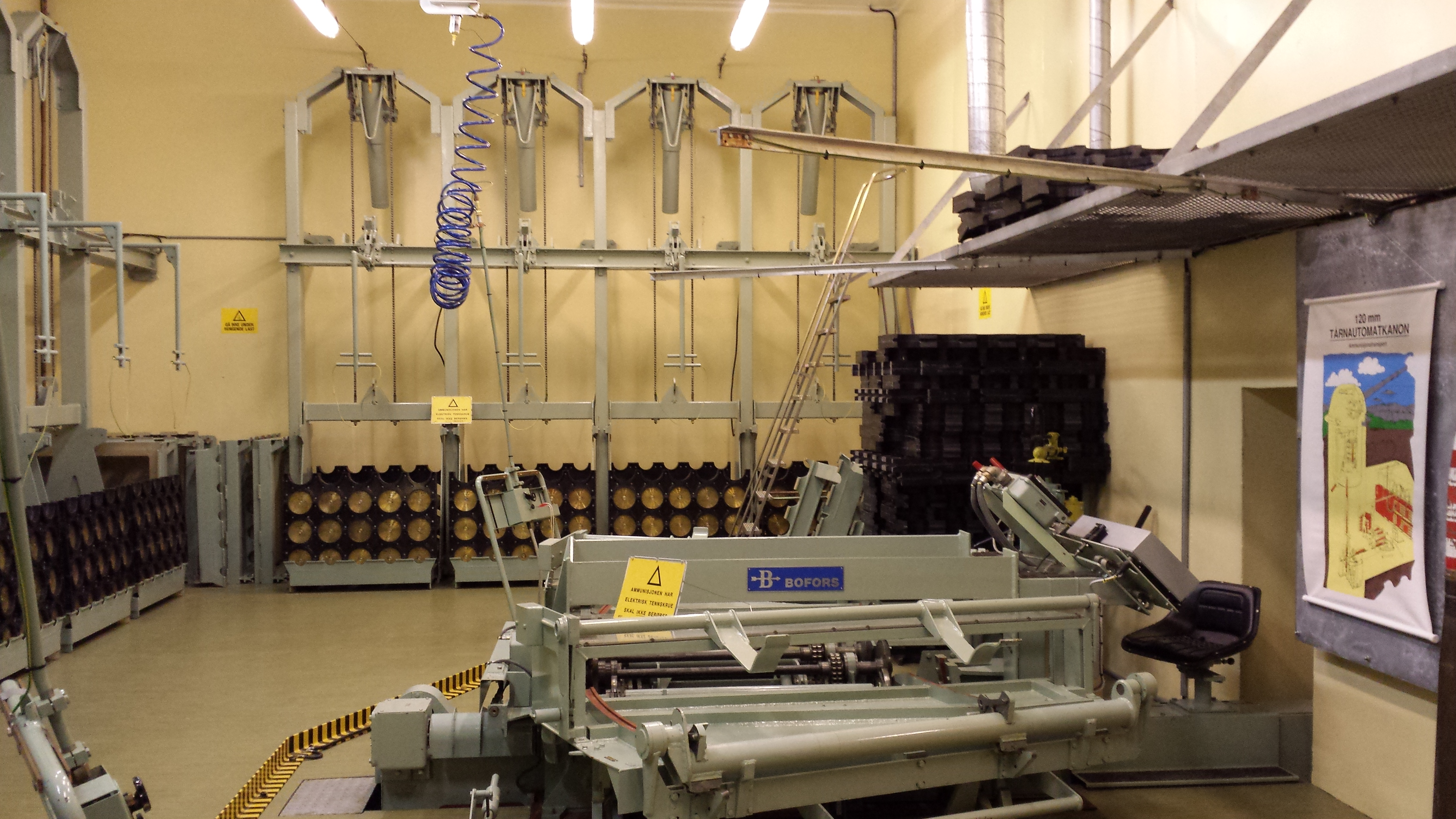
Ammunition Room - Gun A

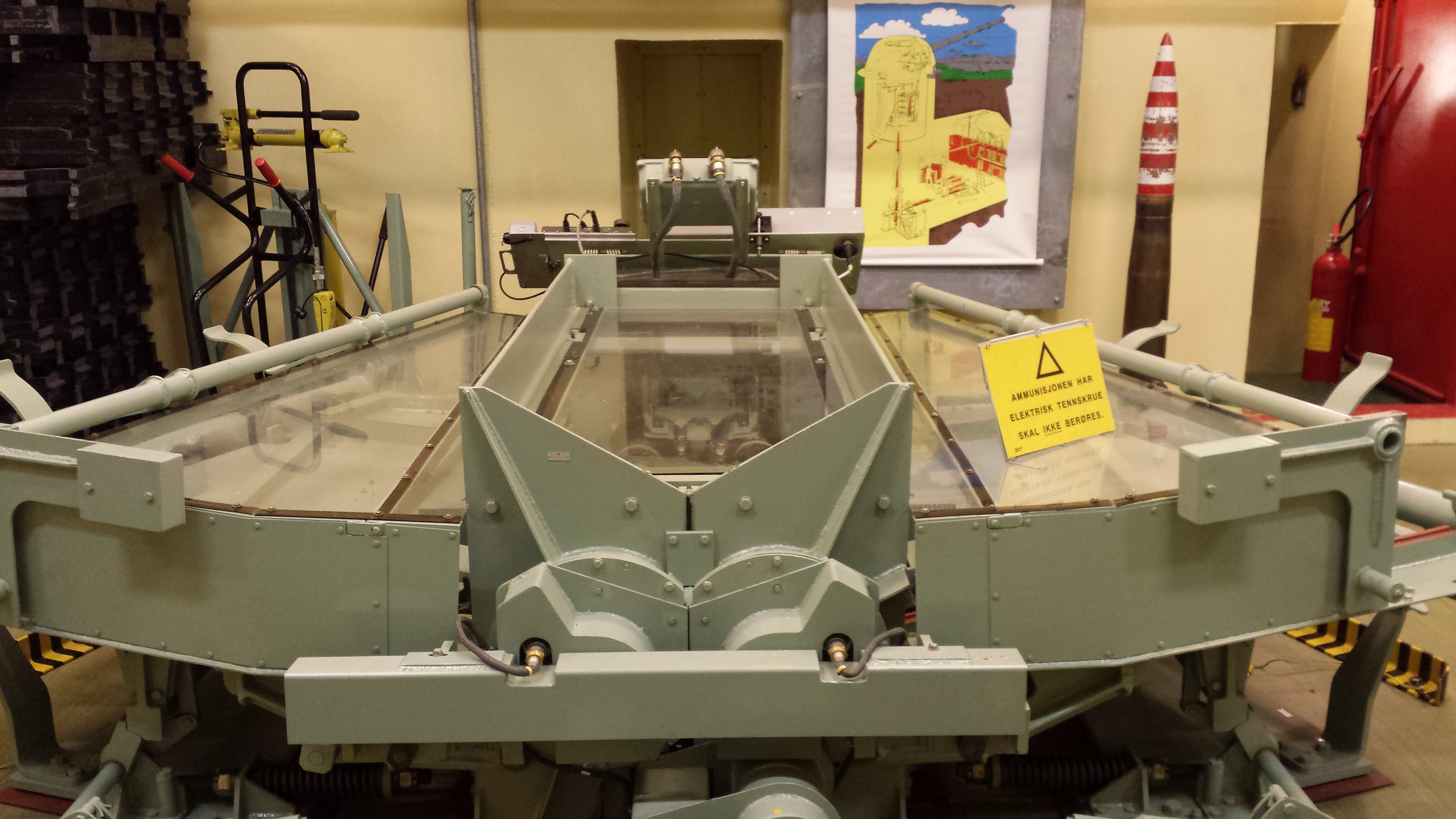
Loading Chamber

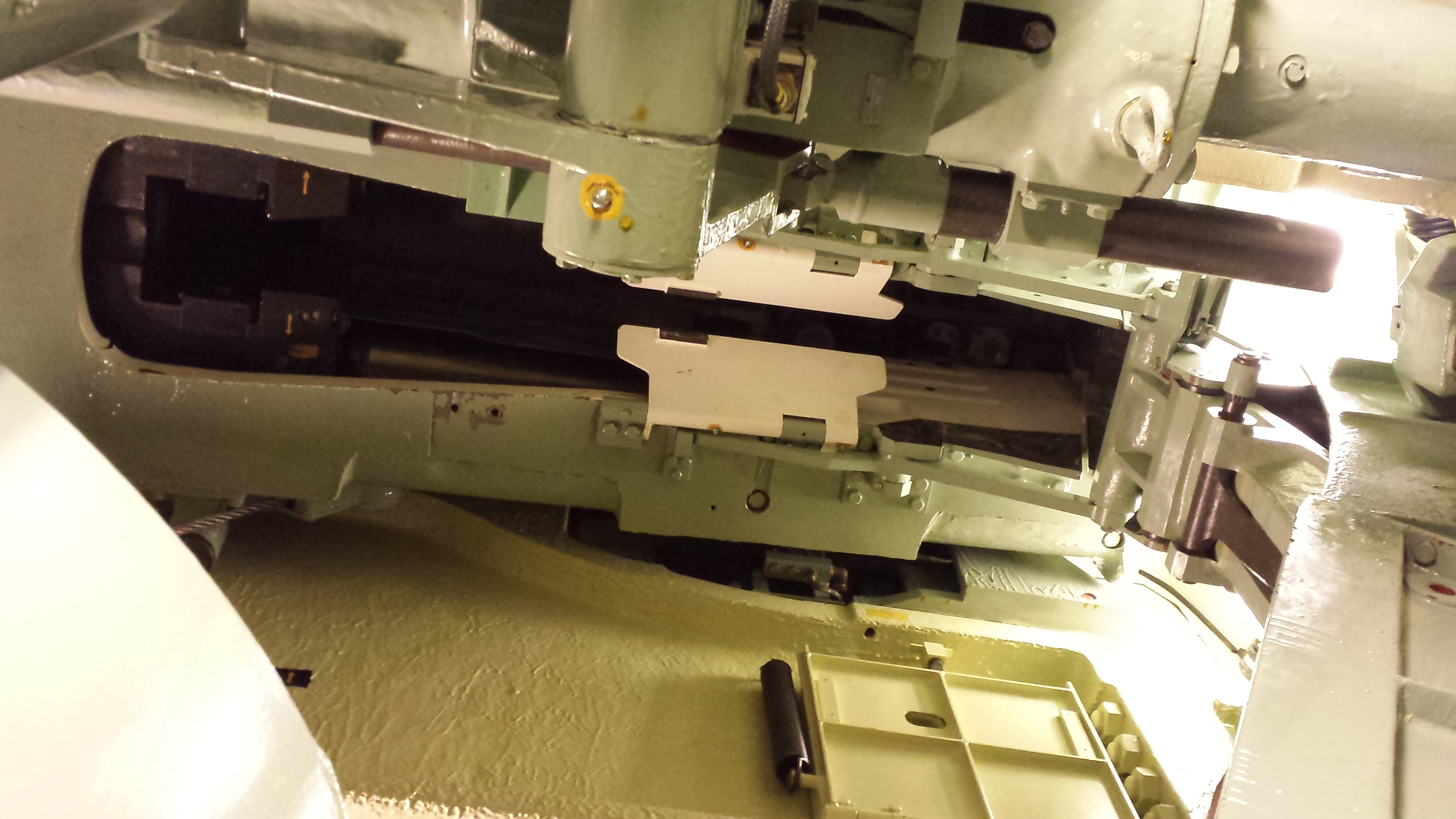
Loading Mechanism - Gun A

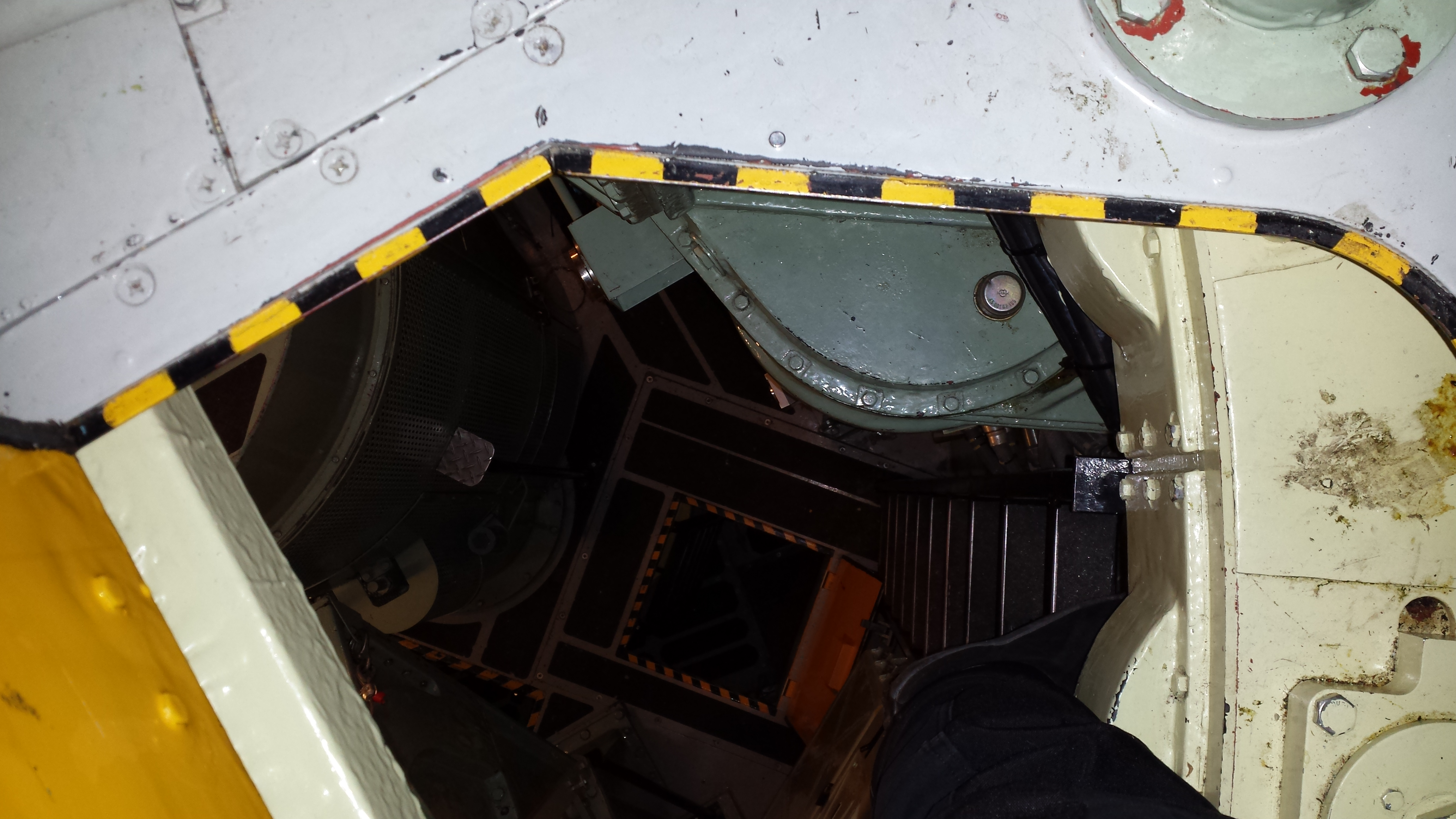
Inside - Gun A

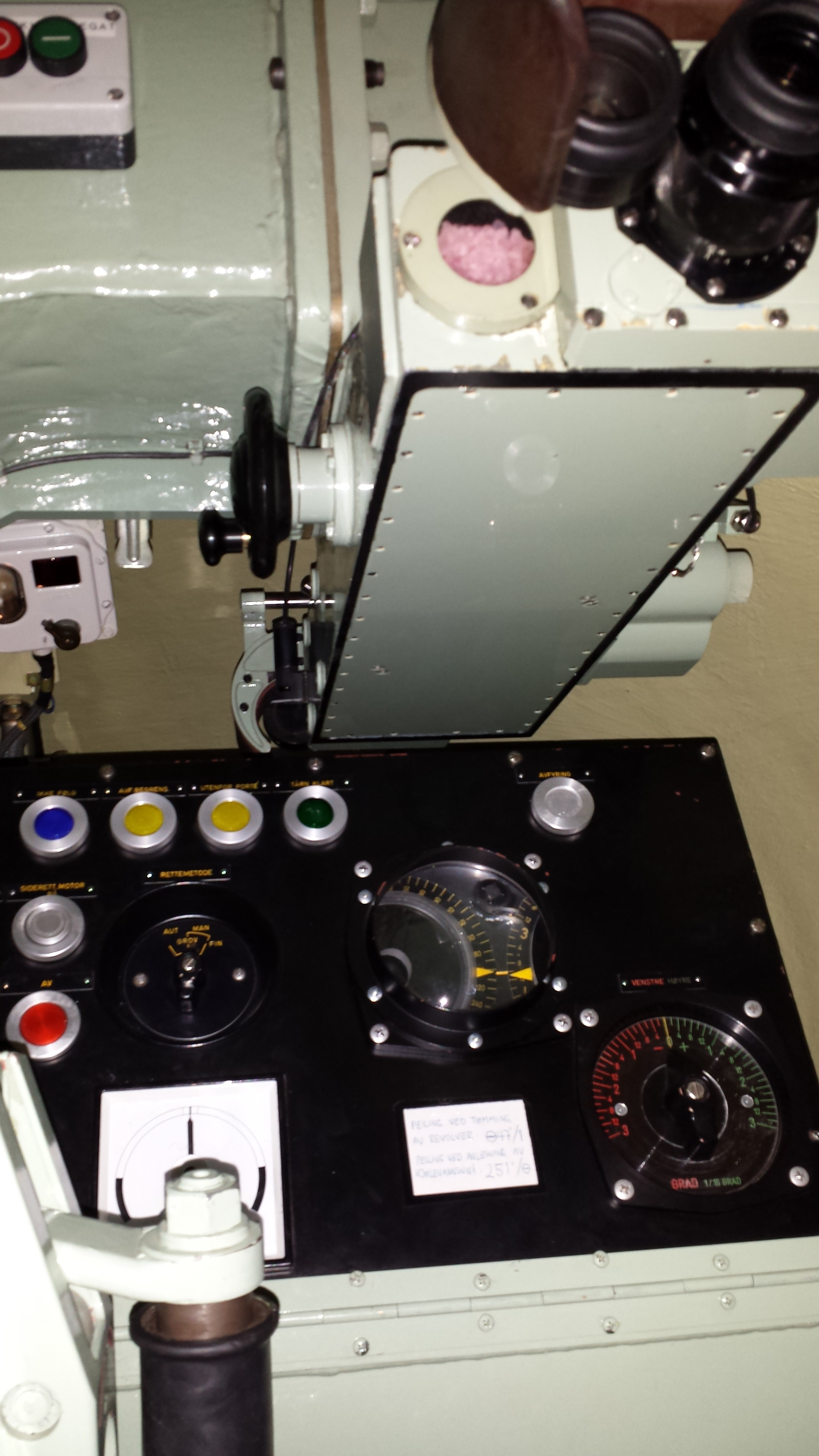
Seat of the gun traverse - Gun A

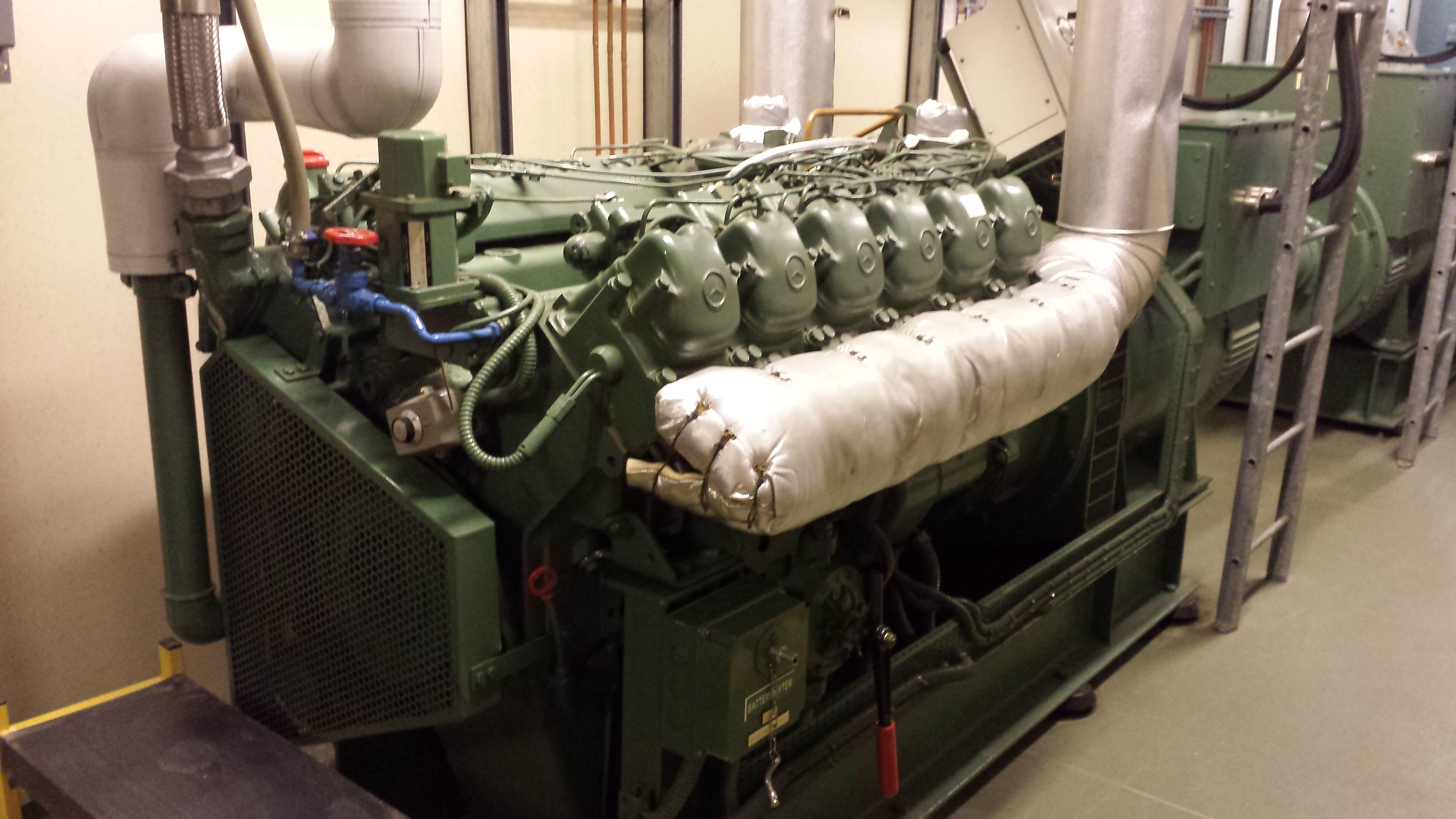
Diesel Generator

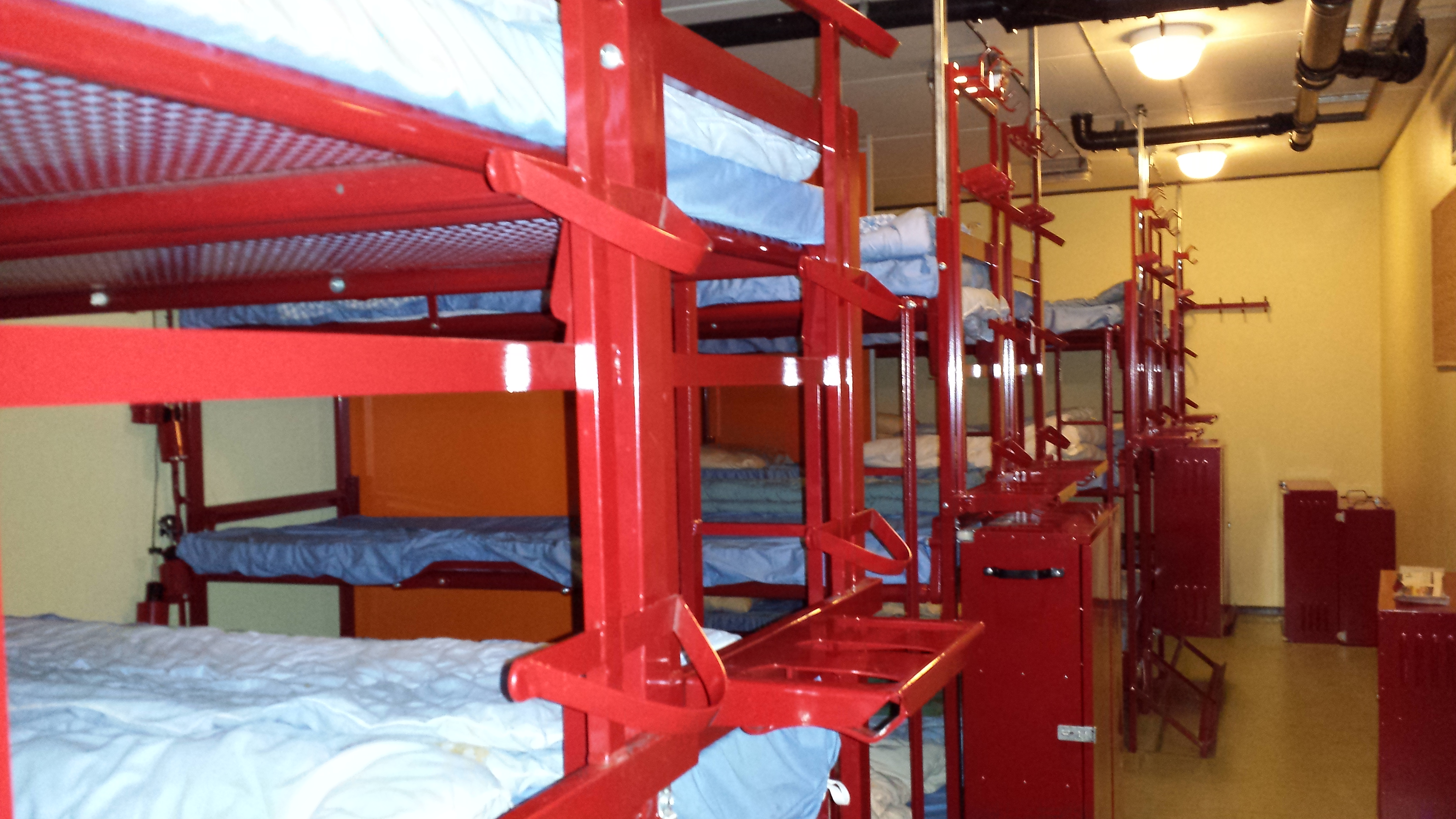
Bunk Beds - Gun A

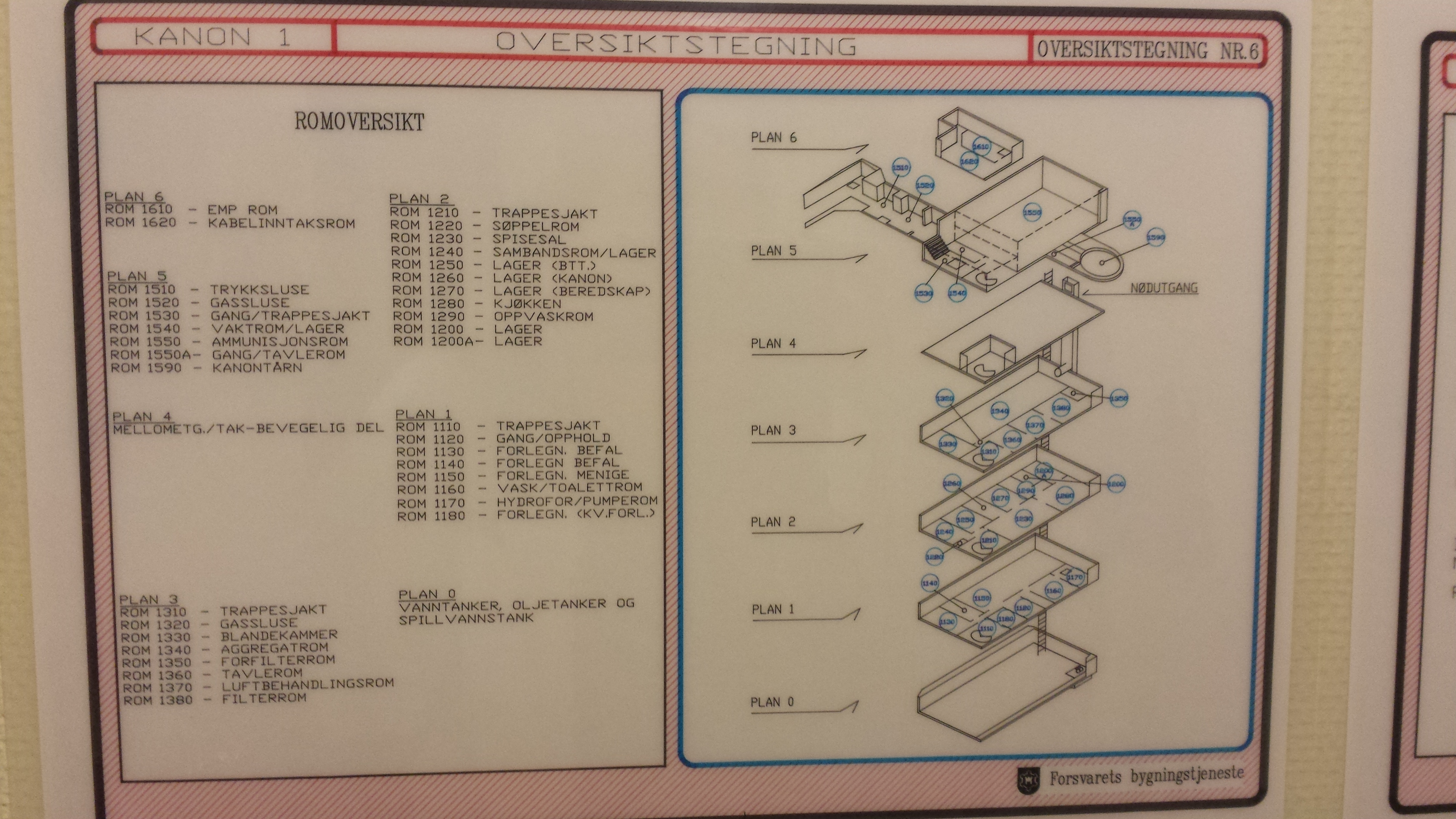
Site Map - Gun A

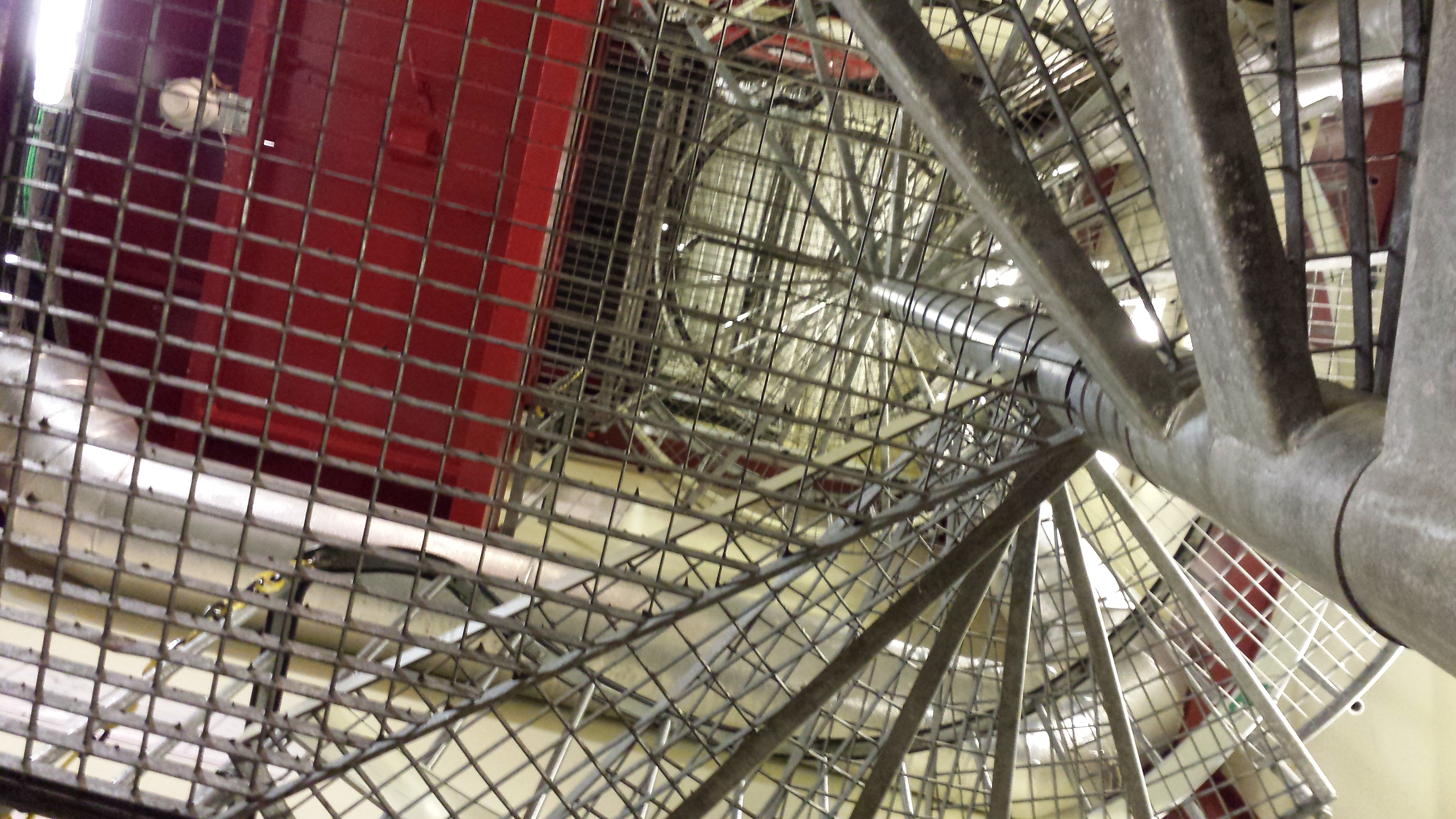
Spiral Staircase - Gun A

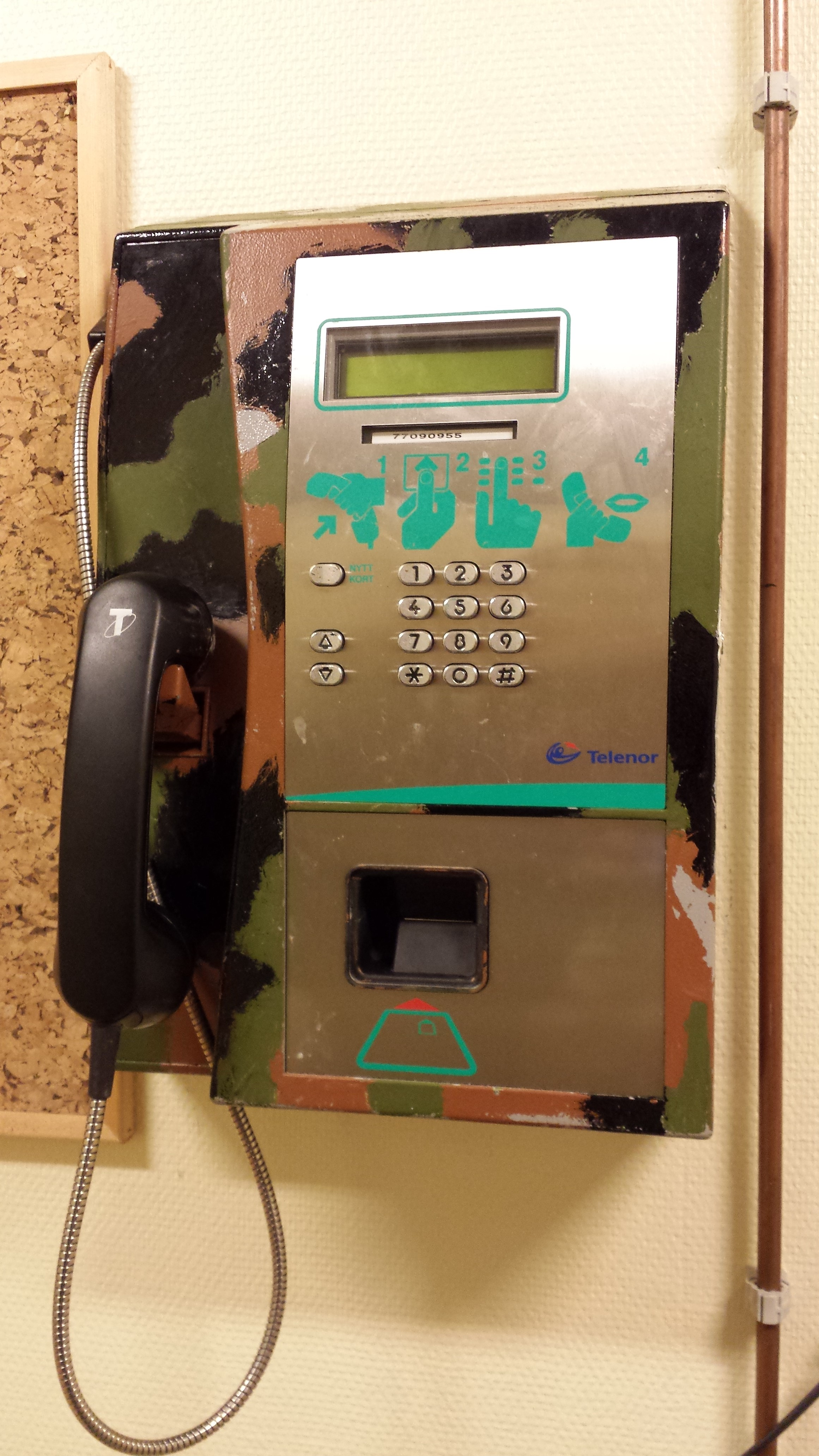
Military Version of a 1990s Card Telephone
