= 12 cm tornautomatpjäs m/70 =

12 cm tornautomatpjäs m/70 (ERSTA)
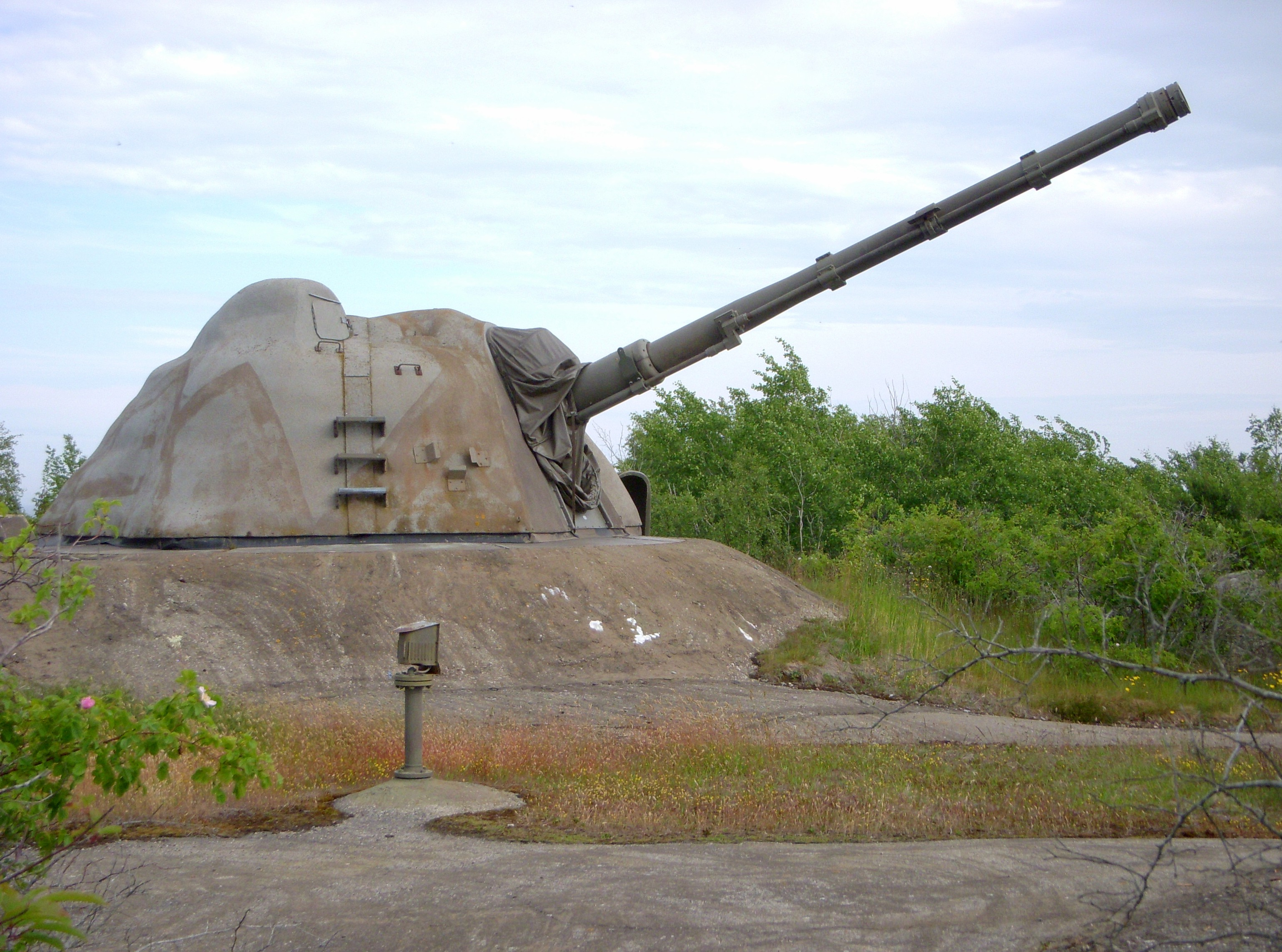
- Bofors 120 mm m/70 at Landsort, Sweden.
- Type: Coastal Artillery
- Place of origin: Sweden

Service history
- In service: 1976–2000 (Sweden); 1989–2001 (Norway)
- Used by: Sweden; Norway

Production history
- Designer: Bofors
- Designed: 1970
- Manufacturer: Bofors
- Produced: 1971–1985
- No. built: 26
- Variants: tapj 9101 tapj 9102

Specifications
- Mass: 62,000 kg (137,000 lb)
- Barrel length: L/62, 7.467 m (24 ft 6 in)
- Crew: 12
- Caliber: 120 mm (4.7 in) L/62
- Action: Automatic
- Breech: Vertical sliding-wedge
- Carriage: Armored fixed turret
- Elevation: -3°/+55°, 5°/s
- Traverse: 360°, 10°/s
- Rate of fire: 25 rounds/min
- Muzzle velocity: 880 m/s (2,900 ft/s)
- Maximum firing range: 27 km (17 mi)
- Feed system: 800 rounds

The 12 cm tornautomatpjäs m/70 ("12 cm automatic turret gun model 1970"), also known as ERSTA (Ersättning Tungt Artilleri or "Replacement Heavy Artillery") was developed to defend vital points like seaports from enemy landing ships, as well as area denial and fire support, even on a nuclear battlefield. Due to political cost-cutting requirements, the number of 12/70 batteries built in Sweden was limited to six. For the same reason, some protection aspects were abandoned.

== History ==
In the 1960s, the Swedish Coastal Artillery sought to replace several older heavy artillery systems. A study called ERSTA (Ersättning Tungt Artilleri – "Replacement Heavy Artillery") was initiated to ascertain which alternative (conventional artillery, rocket artillery or missiles) would be best for heavy coastal defense.

=== The ERSTA study ===
The ERSTA study was a 1960s Swedish coastal defense study aimed at determining what would become the next heavy coastal defense system. A 120 mm automatic gun system was eventually selected.

Rb 08 anti-ship missile installations were seriously considered but abandoned, possibly because much of that project may have been exposed to the Soviet Union by Stig Wennerström, the spy who also leaked vital information about the air defense system STRIL 60.

=== Deployment ===
Several locations were studied and suggested for 12/70 batteries, and 10 locations were eventually selected and constructed in two series. In the end, due to funding issues, only the first series of six batteries was built starting in 1971. Additional cost-cutting measures had to be taken so EMP protection was severely reduced and the supporting installation of each gun was made smaller by replacing the full featured kitchen with a less capable galley and reducing the overall size of the crew quarters.

== System description ==
Each 12/70 battery consists of three fully independent gun emplacements, a command center, ranging stations and a close-in defense system with AA guns, mortar positions and troop shelters. There were two different kinds of 12/70 installation, known by their Bofors designations TAPJ 9101 and TAPJ 9102 (TAPJ is an acronym for TornAutomatPJäs). The 9101 system was designed to be installed in a large hole blasted in the bedrock, while 9102 was a variant which did not require such a deep hole and would be installed in a large hole dug in soil, i.e., where no stable rock was available. On both variants the hole is plugged with several meters of densely reinforced special concrete.

=== Turret and gun system ===
The 12/70 gun is a fully automatic, water-cooled vertical sliding wedge design mounted in an armored turret which is electrically traversed under computer control while the elevation motor is controlled manually (presumably a cost-cutting measure). It is fed from a magazine several meters below ground where the crew uses special air-cushion carts to feed cartridges onto a loading table. From the loading table the cartridge is fed through a hoist system and loaded into the gun using a pendulum loader. Spent cartridges are passed down a chute into a space at the bottom of the gun well, which is over 18 m (59 ft) deep on tapj 9101 and a few meters less on tapj 9102. The turret is operated by three soldiers (gun commander, traverse operator and elevation operator) with the rest of the gun crew working in the magazine or the installation below.

To protect the gun system from ground shockwaves and overpressure in case of a nuclear detonation, the barrel is lowered into its storage position in a special "ground attachment fork" and the turret is hydraulically lowered and anchored to its foundation. The muzzle is automatically sealed when the barrel is lowered into storage position. During a nuclear attack, the turret crew may not stay in the turret because of the initial radiation, but they may reoccupy it and be ready to fight immediately after the attack thanks to a special liner which reduces induced radiation to such a point that it is safe to immediately reoccupy the turret.

=== Supporting installation ===
Each gun emplacement is supported by an installation which contains power supply, accommodation and a galley. This enables at least 60 days endurance when cut off from the outside world. It consists of a steel-framed structure placed on rubber cushions for protection from ground shockwaves. On a type 9101 emplacement, this installation is a 3-story structure placed below the magazine.

The command and control center is a larger installation consisting of a 5-story building of a similar design which also has a more capable kitchen and a sickbay with surgery capability. In addition to cables and ordinary radio masts, the 12/70 command features reserve masts which are normally stored in silos below ground and may be raised as needed.

=== Fire control ===
The 12/70 system marked the first use of the ArtE 724 digital fire control system. This may be fed information from several type of ranging stations, chiefly a radar system called HSRR which consists of a radar antenna normally stored below ground under an armored hatch. At least two surveillance radars are attached to the battery, and when a target is detected the HSRR may be raised and used for ranging reducing the time it is exposed above ground.

The other main ranging instrument is a laser rangefinder called AML 702 installed along with a low-light TV camera in an armored turret called the "laser eye". This can be remote controlled from the ranging station or command center and takes the place of the periscopes used in older installations.

== Swedish forts ==
No.	Designator	Name	Location	Type	Completed
1	SA1	Söderarm	Söderarm	9101	1977
2	LO	Landsort	Landsort	9101	1978
3	SE1	Slite	Asunden, Gotland	9101	1979
4	YD1	Ystad	Källesjö, near Ystad	9102	1980
5	TE1	Trelleborg	Gylle, near Trelleborg	9102	1982
6	HO1	Holmögadd	Holmögadd near Umeå	9101	1983

== Norwegian forts ==
No.	Name	Location	9101	Completed	Number of guns
1	Meløyvær fortress	Andfjorden near Harstad	9101	1989	3
2	Nes	Ofotfjorden outside Narvik	9101	1992	2
3	Kråkvåg	Kråkvågfjorden outside Trondheim	9101	1994	3

== Second series ==
A second series of four ERSTA batteries was planned but never realized as political priorities changed in the late 1970s, downplaying the threat of a nuclear attack. The fire control and radar systems meant for series #2 were redirected to a few older installations that were modernized in the mid-1980s as a very cheap and effective way to improve performance.

== Modifications and final disposal ==
The Swedish 12/70 system was slated for modernization in the early 2000s but with the 1999 decision to abandon all invasion defense it was selected for scrapping instead. One gun emplacement, gun #3 at Landsort, has been declared a State Construction Memorial and will be preserved, although it is unclear if it can be shown to the public other than on special occasions due to its remote location, modern accessibility requirements etc.

== Norwegian export ==
In the late 1980s eight guns were exported to Norway, where they were installed in two 3-gun batteries and one 2-gun battery between 1989 and 1994. Unlike the Swedish installations the Norwegians decided to implement EMP protection and enlarge the supporting installations in order to improve crew comfort. The Norwegian installations, being about 10 years newer, also feature a more modern fire control and communications system. All guns were mothballed in 2001, seven of the guns were dismantled in 2012/2013. One gun at Meløyvær Fortress is preserved along with the command central as a museum.

== See also ==
- 130 53 TK, a comparable Finnish coastal artillery system made by Tampella.
- 12 cm mobile coastal artillery gun m/80, Swedish mobile coastal artillery gun made by Bofors
