= Krøttøya =

Island in Harstad Municipality in Troms county, Norway

- Aerial image of Krøttøy (lower) and Meløyvær (upper)
- Interactive map of Krøttøya

Geography
- Location: Troms, Norway
- Coordinates: 69.0566°N 16.5318°E
- Archipelago: Meløyvær
- Area: 1.3 km^{2} (0.50 sq mi)
- Length: 3.4 km (2.11 mi)
- Width: 1.7 km (1.06 mi)
- Coastline: 7 km (4.3 mi)
- Highest elevation: 99 m (325 ft)
- Highest point: Nordlystoppen (Kollen)

Administration
- Norway
- County: Troms
- Municipality: Harstad Municipality

Demographics
- Population: 3 in winter, ca. 100 in summer (2015)

Krøttøya is an island in Harstad Municipality in Troms county, Norway. The 1.3-square-kilometre (0.50 sq mi) island is the northernmost inhabited island in the Andfjorden. It is located in the Meløyvær archipelago, consisting of 365 small islands, with over 20 white-sand beaches. Several other islands are connected to Krøttøya by road, but the island group is only accessible by boat. Krøttøy is surrounded by the large islands of Senja to the east, Bjarkøya and Grytøya to the south, and Andøya to the west.

== Flora and fauna ==
During the winter season (October–March) large schools of herring arrive in Andfjorden, followed by orcas, humpback whales, and fin whales. Sperm whales and pilot whales are encountered all year round.

== Attractions and activities ==
The main attractions are Viking graves and the Meløyvær fortress which is a national museum. The island was of great strategic importance during the Cold War thus holding back a possible naval attack of the Soviet Navy on the supply lines and defence positions of the Norwegian Army in Northern Norway. At full capacity, it had stationed up to 450 soldiers of the Norwegian Army. In 2002 the army left the fort and since then visitors from outside are allowed in the fort without security clearances. Some of the bunkers and military buildings are now privately owned. Valhall, an ex-military summer residence was renovated in 2007 and now serves as a hotel. The main activities are whale watching, sea eagle safaris, fishing, sea kayaking, and diving.

== Gallery ==
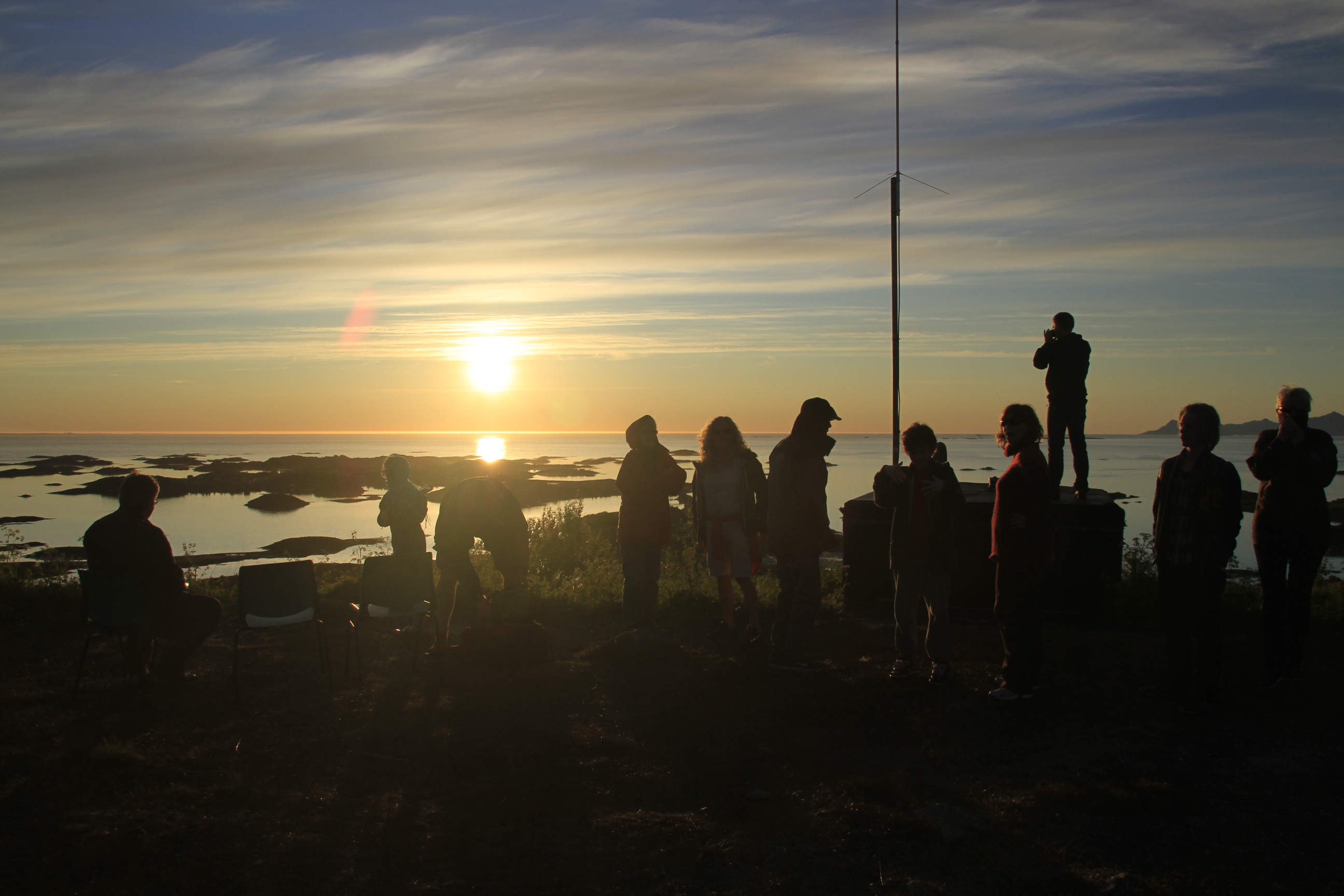
Midnight sun view from the Nordlystoppen

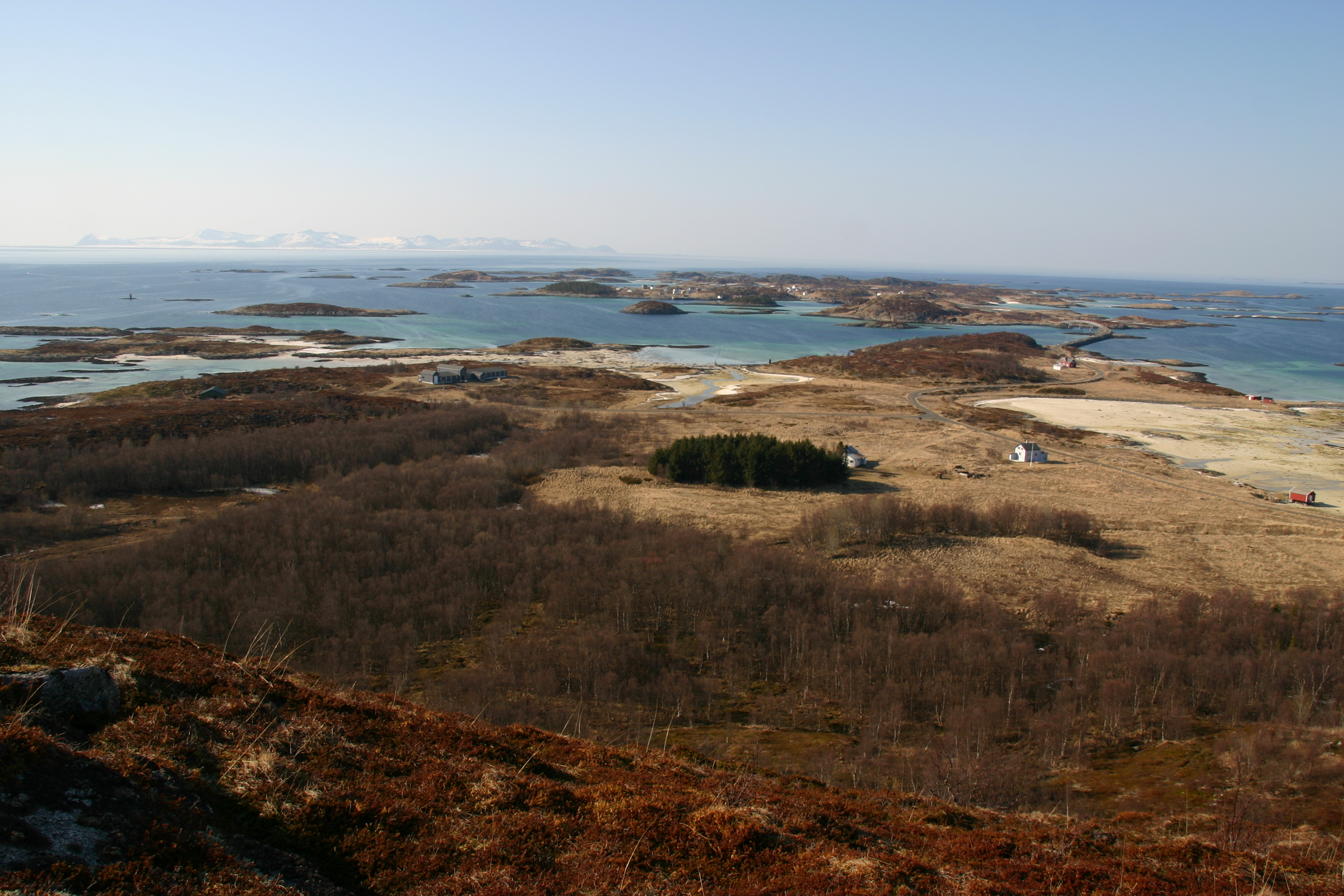
Meløyvær and Krøttøy seen from the Nordlystoppen

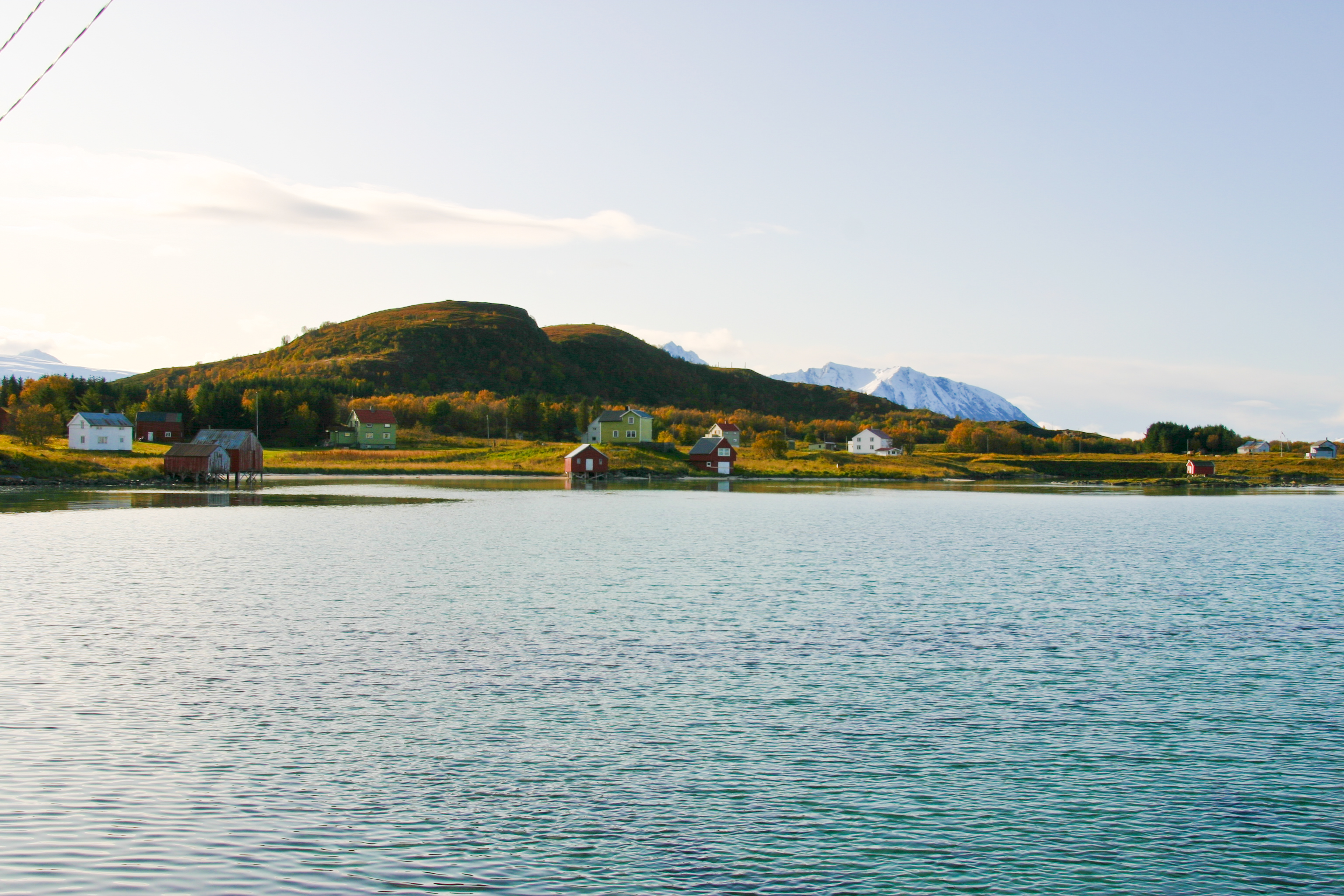
Nordlystoppen (Kollen) 99m, as seen in summer

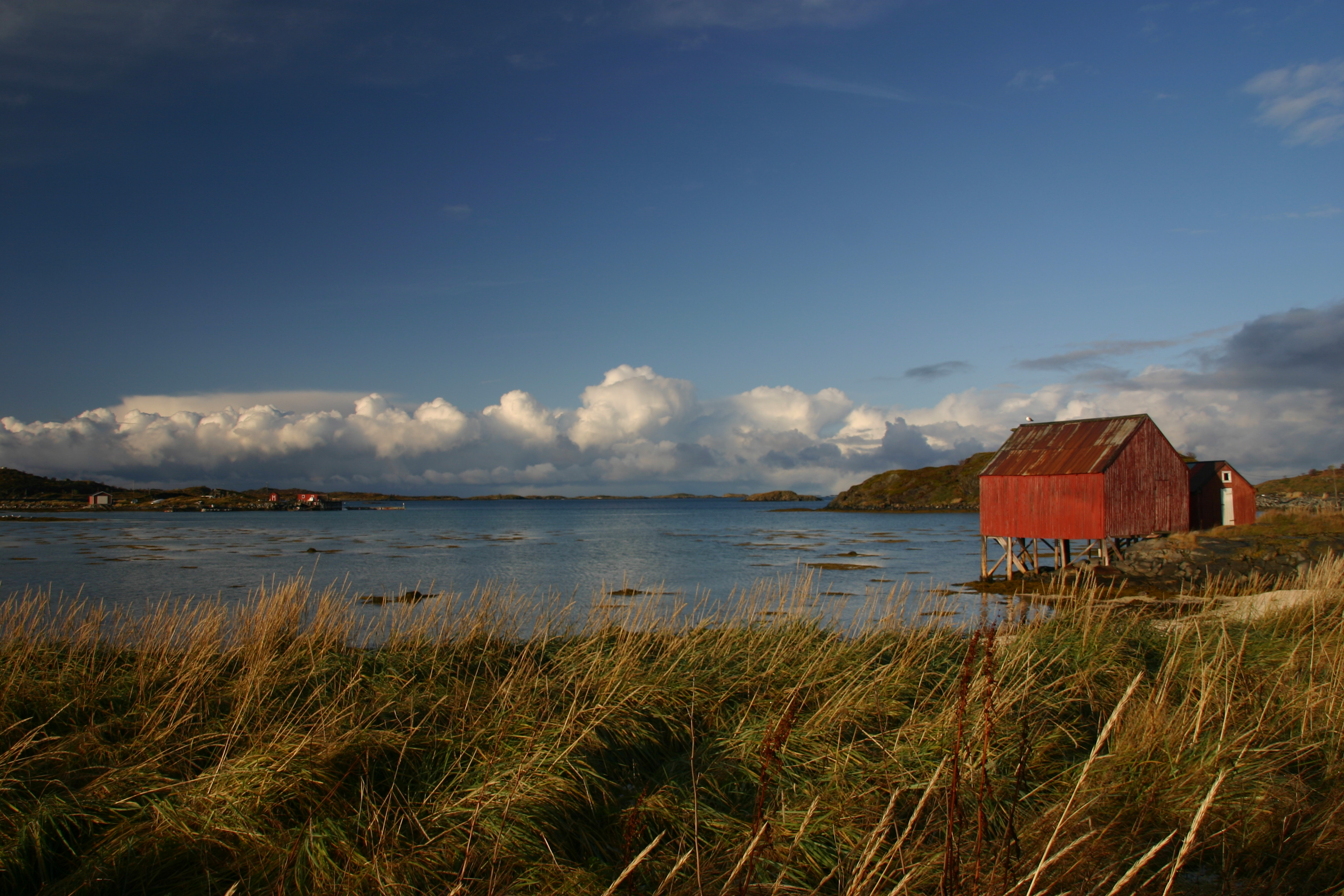
A view to the north from the Nordlysveien - Krøttøy

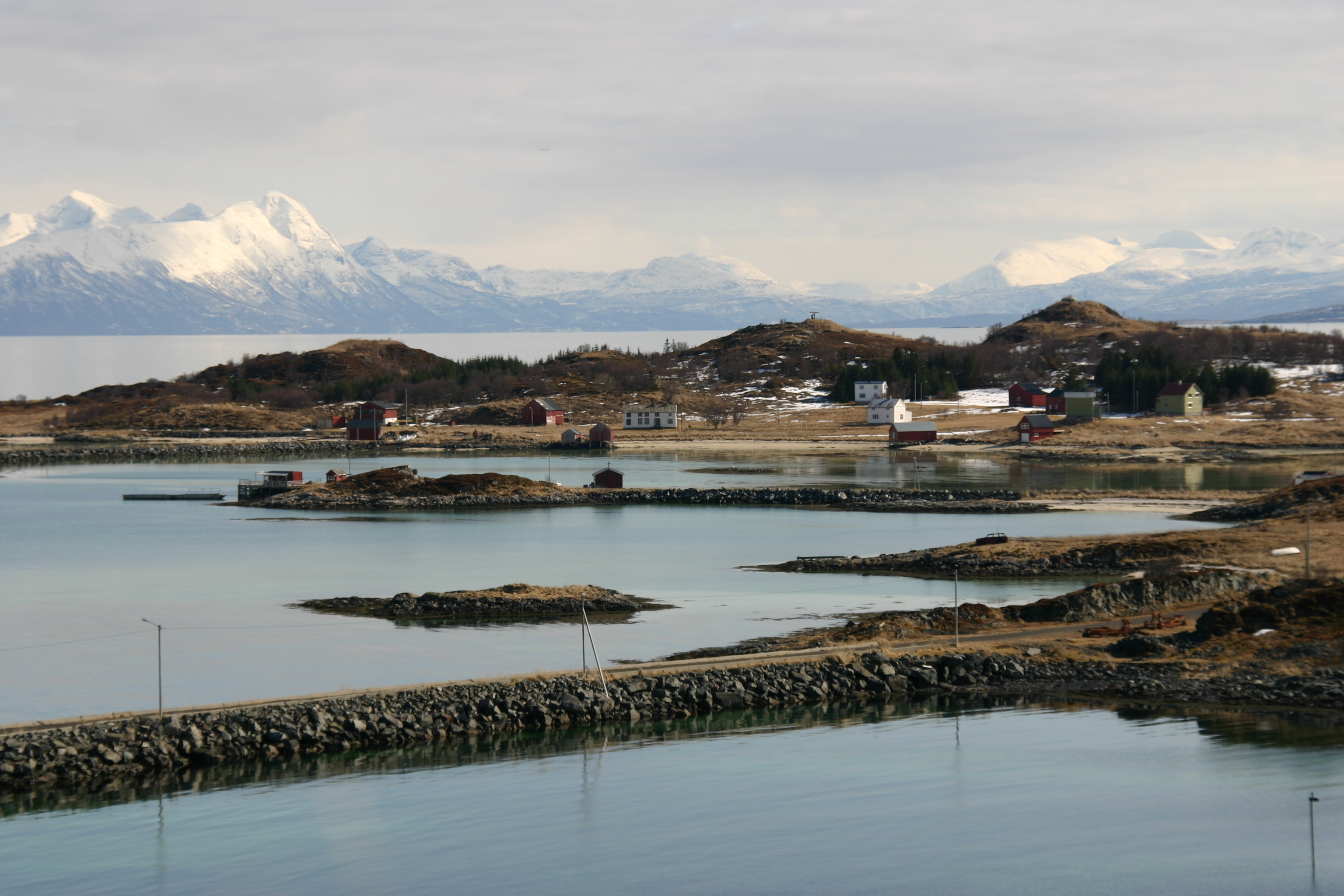
A view from Meløya with Andørja in the background

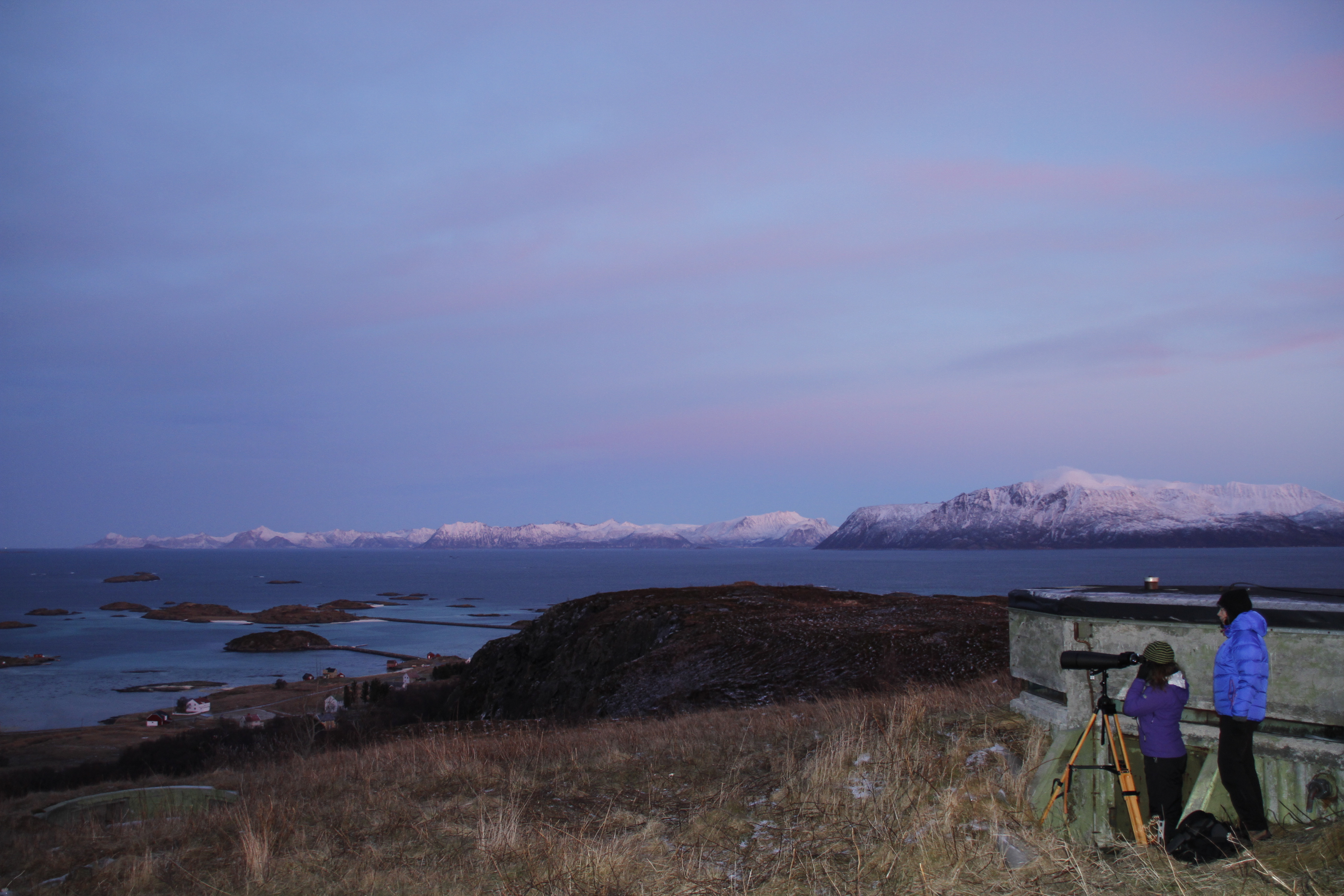
Whale observation from Nordlystoppen - Krøttøy

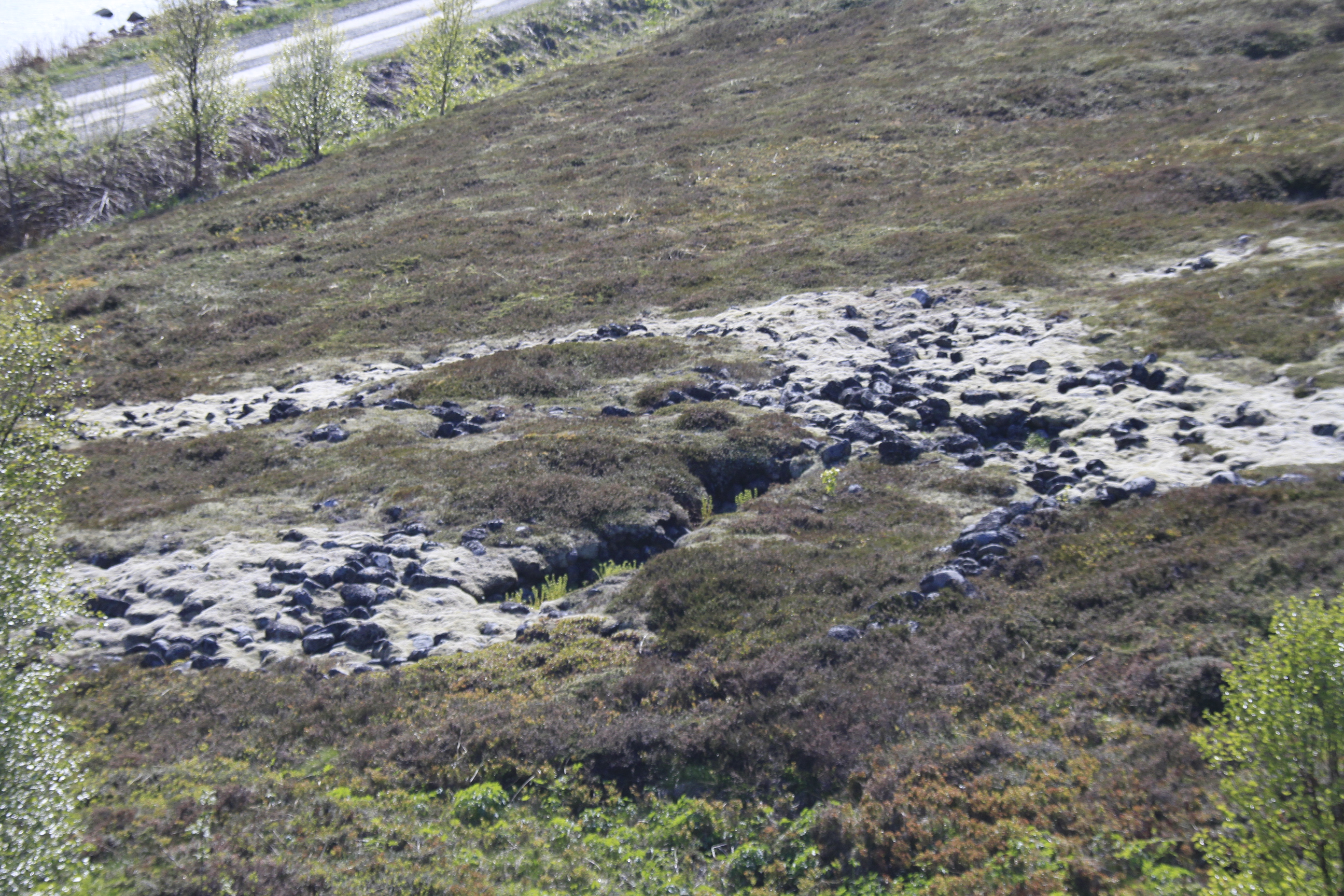
Ancient settlement from the Viking Age - Krøttøy

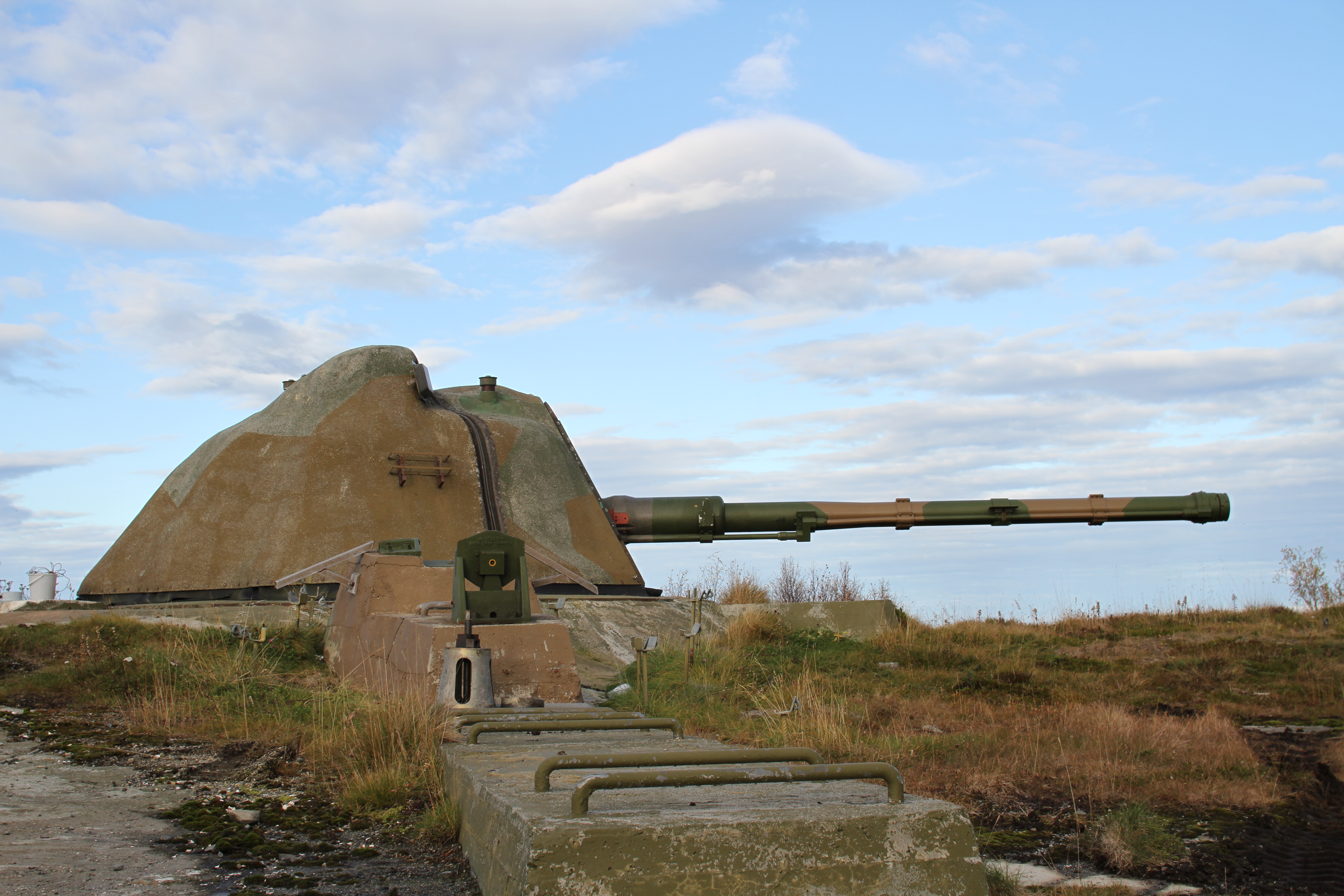
Cannon B - Meløyvær Fortress

== Transport ==
Krøttøy is inhabited year-round by a few people and in the summer its population increases dramatically. It is connected daily by a catamaran operated by Boreal Transport with the islands of Bjarkøya and Senja and with the town of Harstad. There is also a bridge connecting Krøttøya with Meløyvær.
