= Andfjorden =

Fjord on the border of Nordland and Troms counties in Norway

Andfjorden (Norwegian); Ánddavierddas (Northern Sami)
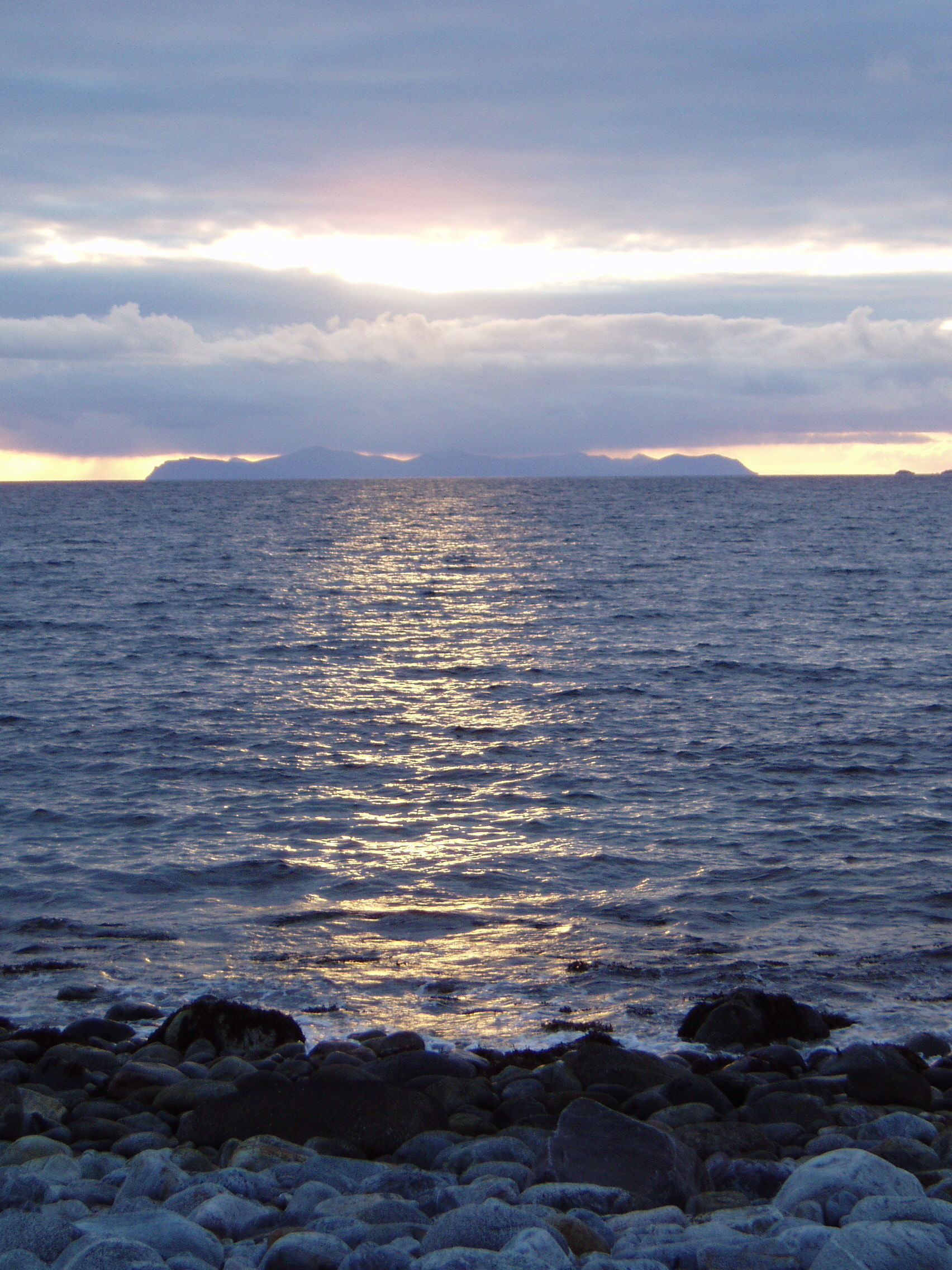
- View of the fjord from Nupen in Kvæfjord, looking northwest towards Andøya
- Interactive map of: Andfjorden (Norwegian); Ánddavierddas (Northern Sami)
- Location: Troms/Nordland counties, Norway
- Coordinates: 69.0560°N 16.0519°E
- Type: Fjord
- Basin countries: Norway
- Max. length: 60 kilometres (37 mi)
- Max. width: 30 kilometres (19 mi)
- Max. depth: 517 metres (1,696 ft)

Andfjorden (Norwegian) or Ánddavierddas (Northern Sami) is a fjord on the border of Nordland and Troms counties in Norway. It is located in Andøy Municipality, Senja Municipality, Harstad Municipality, and Kvæfjord Municipality. The fjord primarily flows between the large islands of Andøya and Senja. Grytøya and the smaller islands Bjarkøya and Krøttøya are located in the fjord. The main crossing is via the Andenes–Gryllefjord Ferry.

The fjord is about 60 kilometres (37 mi) long, has a maximum width of 30 kilometres (19 mi), and has a maximum depth of 517 metres (1,696 ft) which makes it a rich feeding ground for Sperm whales and Killer whales. Whale safaris are run from Andenes and from Krøttøya. Several other fjords branch off the Andfjorden including the Kvæfjorden, Godfjorden, and the Vågsfjorden.

At the tiny Steinavær islands in the Andfjorden, there is a large coral reef.

== See also ==
- List of Norwegian fjords
