= Narvik Battalion =

- Insignia of the Narvik Battalion
- Active: 1955–present
- Country: Norway
- Branch: Army
- Type: Infantry
- Role: Mechanized infantry (formerly Light infantry )
- Size: One battlegroup
- Part of: Brigade Nord
- Garrison/HQ: Skjold Garrison
- Nickname: abbr. 2BN (former)
- Mottos: Latin: In hoc Signo Vinces; English: In this sign, thou shalt conquer. Norwegian: Under dette tegnet, skal vi seire.
- Colours: Khaki beret
- Mascot: Griffin

Commanders
- Current commander: Lieutenant Colonel Bjørn Andreassen
- Notable commanders: Sigurd Frisvold; Arne Bård Dalhaug

Insignia
- Standard

The Narvik Battalion (Norwegian: Narvik bataljon), formerly named the 2nd Battalion (Norwegian: 2. bataljon; abbreviated as 2BN), is an infantry unit of the Norwegian Army, based at camp Skjold in Troms county in Northern Norway. It serves in the light infantry role specialized in Arctic warfare as part of Brigade Nord; the battalion is one of three manoeuvre battalions within the brigade, along with Telemark Battalion and Panserbataljonen. The Narvik Battalion serves two roles, primarily being organised for domestic defence; however, during Norway's contribution to the NATO forces in Afghanistan, the battalion played a vital role. The Narvik Battalion also contributed consistently to the ISAF forces in northern Afghanistan, supporting an elite trained light infantry, organized as a Quick Reaction Force (QRF).

The battalion uses a khaki beret, as opposed to the traditional black beret worn by cavalry units throughout the world, which symbolizes the battalion's history. The motto of the battalion is In hoc Signo Vinces (Latin for "In this sign, thou shalt conquer."). Translated in Norwegian to "Under dette tegnet, skal vi seire.", it refers to the griffin seen on the coat of arms.

== History ==
In November 2007, during Operation Harekate Yolo, soldiers from the Narvik Battalion and the Coastal Ranger Command Kystjegerkommandoen stationed in Mazar-e-Sharif were involved in what has been referred to as some of the heaviest combat operations involving Norwegian Army troops since World War II.

After an Afghan National Army (ANA) unit was attacked by Taliban forces in the Ghowrmach district in the province of Baghdis, soldiers from Narvik Battalion and Kystjegerkommandoen responded. Outnumbered and facing heavy Taliban resistance, machine guns, mortar teams, snipers and CV9030s were used to attack the enemy combatants.

Air strikes were eventually called in to drive off the remaining Taliban fighters. While no NATO casualties were reported, the exact Taliban death toll had not yet been disclosed as of 9 November 2007. However, according to Norwegian news reports, "between 45 and 65 insurgents" were killed in action. This was the first known uses of the Swedish-made CV9030 in live combat.

The Narvik Battalion is named after the Battle of Narvik in 1940, honouring the Norwegian efforts during the battle. The battalion was renamed in December 2025 as part of a broader initiative to honor the Norwegian Army's 400-year history.

== Organization ==
The battalion is divided into four companies: Bravo company, Charlie company, the cavalry squadron and the support company. Bravo company and Charlie company serves as specialized light infantry, focusing on Arctic warfare and urban warfare. The cavalry squadron is the battalion's internal intelligence unit as well as consisting of one platoon of marksmen. The support company is the largest of the four, and primarily consists of medics, anti-tank personnel, combat, service and support.

Name	Abbreviation	Field
Companies
Bravo Company	B Coy	mechanized infantry
Charlie Company	C Coy	mechanized infantry
Cavalry Squadron	CavSqn	recce
Support Company	CS/CSS Coy	
Support Company platoons
HQ Platoon		
Medical Platoon		Medics
Combat Service Support Platoon		resupply, repair & recovery
Mortar Platoon		Mortars
Anti Tank Platoon		FGM-148 Javelin
