= Øverbygd Municipality =

Former municipality in Troms, Norway

Øverbygd Municipality Øverbygd herred
- Former municipality
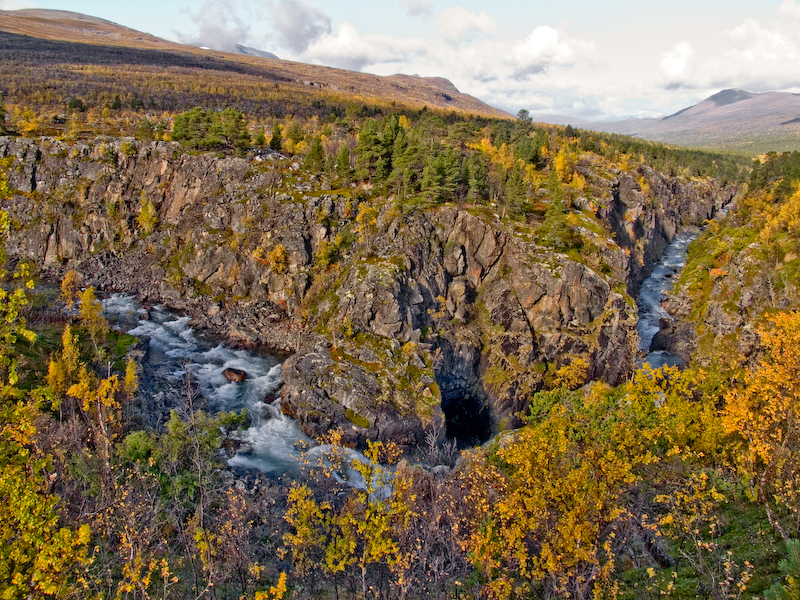
- View of the Øvre Dividal park in Øverbygd

- Troms within Norway

- Øverbygd within Troms
- Coordinates: 69°01′27″N 19°17′45″E
- Country: Norway
- County: Troms
- District: Hålogaland
- Established: 1 July 1925
  - Preceded by: Målselv Municipality
- Disestablished: 1 Jan 1964
  - Succeeded by: Målselv Municipality
- Administrative centre: Skjold

Government
  - Mayor (1955-1963): Ole M. Stefanussen (LL)

Area (upon dissolution)
  - Total: 2,103.95 km^{2} (812.34 sq mi)
  - Rank: #20 in Norway
- Highest elevation: 1,717.1 m (5,634 ft)

Population (1963)
  - Total: 1,217
  - Rank: #582 in Norway
  - Density: 0.6/km^{2} (1.6/sq mi)
  - Change (10 years): ▲ +56.4%
- Demonym: Øverbygding

Official language
  - Norwegian form: Neutral
- Time zone: UTC+01:00 (CET)
  - Summer (DST): UTC+02:00 (CEST)
- ISO 3166 code: NO-1923

Øverbygd is a former municipality in Troms county in Norway. The 2,104-square-kilometre (812 sq mi) municipality existed from 1925 until its dissolution in 1964. It was located in what is now the eastern part of Målselv Municipality, stretching from the border with Sweden in the east, through the Dividalen and Rostadalen valleys to the Målselva river and the eastern part of the Målselvdalen valley. The administrative centre was the village of Skjold.

Prior to its dissolution in 1963, the 2,104-square-kilometre (812 sq mi) municipality was the 20th largest by area out of the 689 municipalities in Norway. Øverbygd Municipality was the 582nd most populous municipality in Norway with a population of about 1,217. The municipality's population density was 0.6 inhabitants per square kilometre (1.6/sq mi) and its population had increased by 56.4% over the previous 10-year period.

Skjold was the site of the local church, Øverbygd Church as well as home to a large garrison for the Norwegian Army. Øvre Dividal National Park made up a large part of the southeastern part of the municipality. Dividalen is used as a setting in TV drama Outlier (2020).

== General information ==
The municipality of Øverbygd was established on 1 July 1925 when the large Målselv Municipality was divided into two municipalities: Målselv in the west and Øverbygd in the east. Initially, Øverbygd had a population of 566 inhabitants.

During the 1960s, there were many municipal mergers across Norway due to the work of the Schei Committee. On 1 January 1964, a major municipal merger took place. All of Øverbygd Municipality (population: 1,232), all of Målselv Municipality (population: 5,584), the Naveren and Målsnes areas of Malangen Municipality (population: 118), and the Skogli ved Heia farm (population: 2) from Balsfjord Municipality were all merged to form a new, larger Målselv Municipality:

=== Name ===
The municipality is named Øverbygd. The first element may be derived from the present tense form of the verb øve which means "to exercise" or "to practice". The last element comes from the word byggð which means "settlement" or "farm".

=== Churches ===
The Church of Norway had one parish (sokn) within Øverbygd Municipality. It was part of the Målselv prestegjeld and the Indre Troms prosti (deanery) in the Diocese of Nord-Hålogaland.

Churches in Øverbygd Municipality
Parish (sokn)	Church name	Location of the church	Year built
Øverbygd	Øverbygd Church	Skjold	1867

== History ==
=== World War II ===
During World War II, the German army created a military base at Øverbygd. The base was initially a supply point for the German forces attack on Murmansk. German soldiers on retreat at the end of the war came through Øverbygd. Maukstadmoen and Holmen were undeveloped pine forests, but virtually all of the commercial forest was cut down to provide German troops land and building materials.

Large barracks for the officer's quarters were established on Maukstadmoen. They also built large stock barracks, a cold storage plant, and a German military hospital. A Prisoner-of-war camp for Russian prisoners of war and medical camp was built near Holmen.

== Geography ==
The highest point in the municipality is the 1,717.1-metre (5,634 ft) tall mountain Njunis.

== Government ==
While it existed, Øverbygd Municipality was responsible for primary education (through 10th grade), outpatient health services, senior citizen services, welfare and other social services, zoning, economic development, and municipal roads and utilities. The municipality was governed by a municipal council of directly elected representatives. The mayor was indirectly elected by a vote of the municipal council. The municipality was under the jurisdiction of the Hålogaland Court of Appeal.

=== Municipal council ===
The municipal council (Kommunestyre) of Øverbygd Municipality was made up of 13 representatives that were elected to four year terms. The tables below show the historical composition of the council by political party.

Øverbygd herredsstyre 1959–1963
Party name (in Norwegian)	Number of representatives
Labour Party (Arbeiderpartiet)	3
Conservative Party (Høyre)	4
Local List(s) (Lokale lister)	6
Total number of members:	13
Note: On 1 January 1964, Øverbygd Municipality became part of Målselv Municipality.

Øverbygd herredsstyre 1955–1959
Party name (in Norwegian)	Number of representatives
Local List(s) (Lokale lister)	13
Total number of members:	13

Øverbygd herredsstyre 1951–1955
Party name (in Norwegian)	Number of representatives
Local List(s) (Lokale lister)	12
Total number of members:	12

Øverbygd herredsstyre 1947–1951
Party name (in Norwegian)	Number of representatives
Local List(s) (Lokale lister)	12
Total number of members:	12

Øverbygd herredsstyre 1945–1947
Party name (in Norwegian)	Number of representatives
Local List(s) (Lokale lister)	12
Total number of members:	12

Øverbygd herredsstyre 1937–1941*
Party name (in Norwegian)	Number of representatives
Local List(s) (Lokale lister)	12
Total number of members:	12
Note: Due to the German occupation of Norway during World War II, no elections were held for new municipal councils until after the war ended in 1945.

=== Mayors ===
The mayor (Norwegian: ordfører) of Øverbygd Municipality was the political leader of the municipality and the chairperson of the municipal council. Here is a list of people who have held this position:

- 1925–1931: A.M. Elvevold
- 1931–1941: Bjarne Haug (LL)
- 1942–1943: Tollef Tollefsen
- 1943–1944: Arne Thraasdal
- 1944–1945: Erik Heggelund
- 1945–1945: Bjarne Haug (LL)
- 1946–1947: Åsmund Forseth (Ap)
- 1948–1951: Bjarne Haug (LL)
- 1952–1955: Åsmund Forseth (Ap)
- 1955–1963: Ole M. Stefanussen (LL)

== See also ==
- List of former municipalities of Norway
