= Mottos of Norwegian institutions =

This list contains mottos of Norwegian institutions. Norway does not have a state motto; however, the personal motto of the reigning monarch can be said to fill some of that function. The motto of the three last monarchs has been Alt for Norge which translates roughly as All for Norway. The motto was first chosen by King Haakon VII and immortalised as the rallying motto of the Norwegian resistance against the German occupation of Norway. It is not common for Norwegian municipalities or government agencies to have mottos.

== Monarch ==
Each reigning monarch chooses his personal motto; however, the last four kings have all chosen "Alt for Norge"

== Government institutions ==
Institution	Motto (in original language)	English translation
Norwegian Food Safety Authority	Fra land og fjord til bord	From land and sea to table
Norwegian Labour and Welfare Administration	Vi gir mennesker muligheter	We give people opportunities

== Military ==
Institution	Motto (in original language)	English translation
Norwegian Military Academy	Si vis pacem, para bellum	If you want peace, prepare for war
Norwegian Army 2nd Battalion	In hoc Signo Vinces	In This Sign, Be Victorious
His Majesty The King's Guard	Alt for Kongen	All for the King
Arctic Ranger Company	Agmine Consectamur	We hunt in packs
Norwegian Army Armoured Battalion	Bitit Fyrst	Strike First
Norwegian Artillery battalion	Gjør rett, frykt ingen	Do right, fear no one
6th Division	Styrke for fred, evne til strid	Strength for peace, capability for war
Norwegian Home Guard	Verner - Vokter - Virker	Protects - Guards - Acts
No. 330 Squadron RNoAF	Trygg havet	Make the ocean safe

== Municipalities ==
Institution	Motto (in original language)	English translation
Aurland Municipality	Det naturlege valet	The natural choice
Fjaler Municipality	Eit ope samfunn	An open community
Flora Municipality	Der himmel og hav møtast	Where heaven and sea meet
Rauma Municipality	Verdens beste kommune for naturglade mennesker	The world's best municipality for nature-loving people
Tønsberg Municipality	Der fremtiden skapes	Where the future is made
Vågsøy Municipality	Vekst og trivsel	Growth and enjoyment
