= Squadron (army) =

Cavalry unit size designation

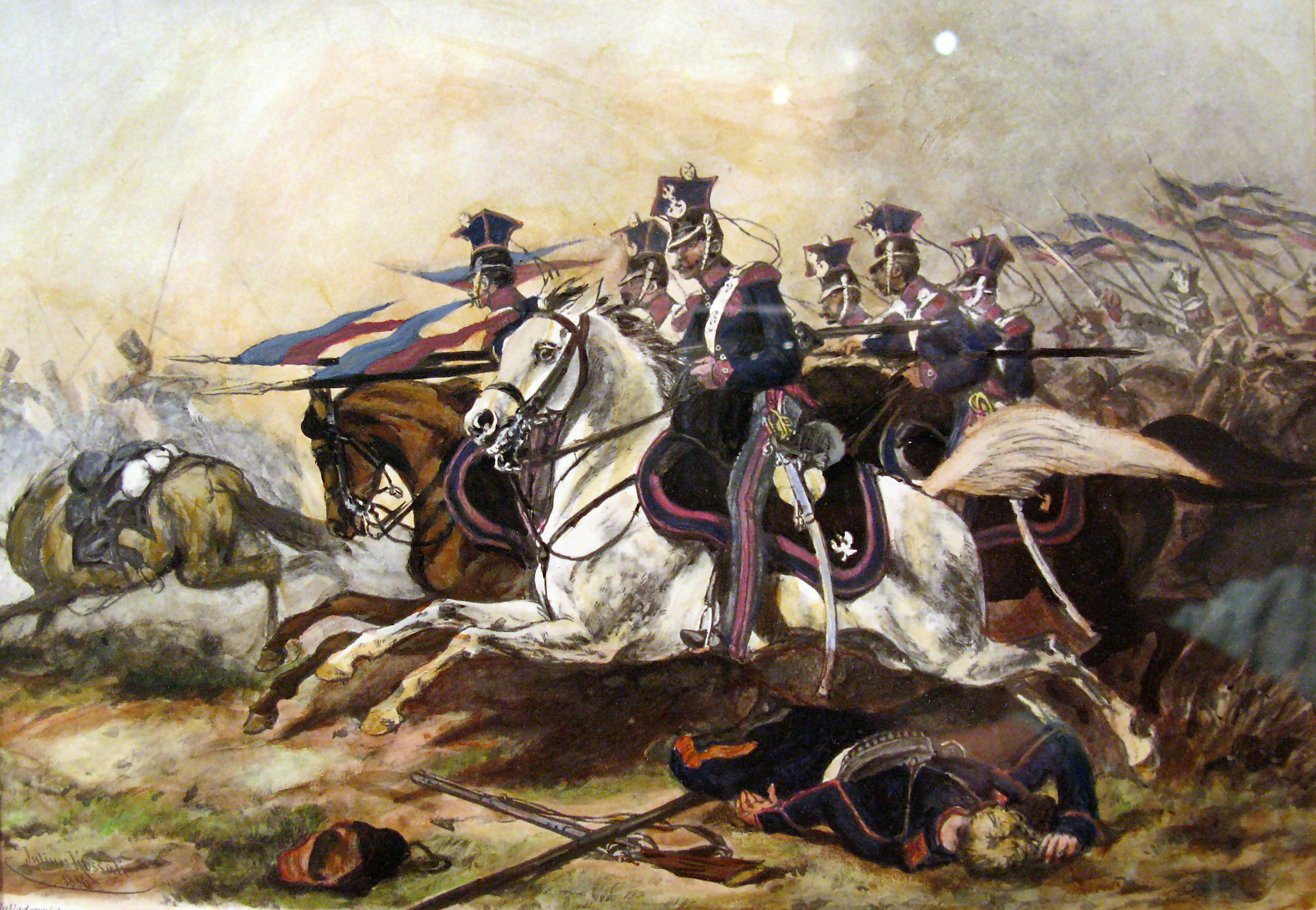
Polish squadron in 1830–31

A squadron was historically a cavalry subunit, a company- or battalion-sized military formation. The term is still used to refer to modern cavalry units, and is also used by other arms and services (frequently aviation, also naval). In some countries, including Italy, the name of the battalion-level cavalry unit translates as "Squadron Group".

== United States ==
In the modern United States Army, a squadron is an armored cavalry, air cavalry, or other reconnaissance unit whose organizational role parallels that of a battalion and is commanded by a lieutenant colonel.

Prior to the revisions in the US Army structure in the 1880s, US Cavalry regiments were divided into companies, and the battalion was an administrative designation used only in garrison. The reorganizations converted companies to troops and battalions to squadrons and made squadrons tactical formations as well as administrative ones.

== Commonwealth ==
In the British Army and many other Commonwealth armies, a squadron is the Royal Armoured Corps counterpart of an infantry company or artillery battery. A squadron is a sub-unit of a battalion-sized formation (usually a regiment), and is usually made up of two or more troops.

The designation is also used for company-sized units in the Special Air Service, Special Reconnaissance Regiment, Honourable Artillery Company, Royal Engineers, Royal Corps of Signals, Royal Army Medical Corps, the Royal Air Force Regiment and Royal Logistic Corps and in the defunct Royal Corps of Transport.

Squadrons are commonly designated using letters or numbers (e.g. No. 1 Squadron or A Squadron), sometimes with alphabetical names (Ajax, Badger, ...) They are also designated according to their role: "519 Signal Squadron", "Tank Delivery Squadron". In some British Army units it is a tradition for squadrons to also be named after an important historical battle in which the regiment has taken part. For example, the Royal Armoured Corps Training Regiment assigns trainees to "Waterloo" Squadron, named in honour of the significance the cavalry played in the Allied forces' victory over Napoleon. In some special cases, squadrons can also be named after a unique honour which has been bestowed on the unit.

== France ==
The modern French Army is composed of troupes à pied (foot soldiers including infantry and combat engineers) and troupes à cheval (mounted soldiers such as armored cavalry units, and transportation units). Nowadays, the term escadron (squadron) is used to describe a company (compagnie) of mounted soldiers but, for a long time, a cavalry escadron corresponded to an infantry battalion, both units grouping several companies (battalion and escadrons were tactical units while the companies were administrative units). The term compagnie has been discontinued and replaced by escadron in cavalry units since 1815 and in transportation units since 1968.

In the "mounted arms" a captain (three galons, or braids) in charge of an escadron is thus called a chef d'escadron (which is a title, not a rank). However, his superior in the hierarchy (four galons) has the rank of chef d'escadrons (the equivalent rank in infantry units being chef de bataillon). After 1815 (in fact around 1826), the army began to write chef d'escadrons with an s in cavalry units to reflect the fact that this officer who used to be in charge of one squadron (several companies before 1815) was now in charge of several squadrons (i.e., companies). In other mounted branches (such as gendarmerie and artillerie), chef d'escadron is still spelled without s.

== Norway ==
Badge of the Assault Squadron 4 of the Armoured Battalion. It is used on vehicles, uniforms and barracks.

The Norwegian army operates with units called eskadroner (pl.), typically a company-equivalent unit, generally in armoured cavalry units although not always.

The 2nd Battalion, Brigade Nord, has a company-equivalent unit called kavalerieskadronen, or "the cavalry squadron". It serves as the main reconnaissance unit in the battalion. Like the mechanized infantry units, it wears the distinct khaki-coloured beret of the battalion instead of the normal black for cavalry units.

The Armoured Battalion (Panserbataljonen) has the majority of its constituents labeled eskadroner. Including the Cavalry Squadron, the Armoured Squadron and the Assault Squadrons. It also includes the battalion's Support element, the Combat Support Squadron. Its members are also referred to as dragoons, reflecting the nature of the unit.

The Telemark Battalion also has a number of units labelled eskadroner. This includes the Armoured Squadron, the Cavalry Squadron and the Combat Support Squadron.

Kampeskadronen (Kampeskadronen) (roughly translated to "The Battle Squadron"), a Squadron consisting of two Mechanized Infantry Platoons, mounted on CV90's, one Armoured Platoon with Leopard 2's and a Combat Service Support Unit. Its soldiers were referred to as dragoons and consisted mostly of conscripted troops. Used as OPFOR in exercise operations with other parts of the Norwegian Army.

== Poland ==
Squadron (szwadron) was used exclusively for companies of cavalry and armoured cavalry before 1948. After 1948, the name has been used for armored formations of various sizes.

== Russia ==
In Russian cavalry a squadron was named эскадрон, eskadron, and was a company-size unit, with 120–150 horses. In the Cossack and militia troops, a squadron corresponded to sotnia.

== Sweden ==
In the Swedish cavalry a skvadron means a unit with the same size as a kompani in the rest of the army (about a hundred men). Also Jägar and military police units may have squadrons.
