= Trial and conviction of Joshua French and Tjostolv Moland =

2009 legal case

Joshua French and Tjostolv Moland were Norwegian citizens working in the Democratic Republic of the Congo. They were arrested in May 2009, on suspicion of killing their hired driver, 47-year-old Abedi Kasongo, on May 5, 2009, at Bafwasende, Tshopo District, Orientale Province, Democratic Republic of Congo. French was arrested on May 9 in the Epulu game reserve, around 200 kilometres (120 mi) from Kisangani. Moland was arrested two days later in the Ituri Province, a few hundred kilometres farther northeast.

After their arrest, French and Moland were charged with killing Kasongo on the Ituri Road, in the vicinity of the 109-kilometre marker between Kisangani and the Ugandan border. Additional charges against the two included attempted murder of a witness, espionage, armed robbery and the possession of illegal firearms.

Their trial, held on August 14, took place before a military court because firearms had been used in the crime. However, according to Mirna Adjami, a local representative of the International Center for Transitional Justice, only Congolese police and army soldiers can be tried before a military tribunal; this raised questions as to the court's legitimacy. Norway's foreign minister Jonas Gahr Støre said in 2009, "We have to be realistic about what our Ministry of Foreign Affairs can do". Representatives of the Ministry, including Thorleif Wangen (embassy secretary), observed the trials.

On 18 August 2013, Moland was found dead in his prison cell. On 17 May 2017, French was released from prison and allowed to return to Norway on humanitarian and health grounds.

== Defendants ==
Joshua French grew up in Re Municipality in Vestfold county and has both Norwegian and British citizenship. Tjostolv Moland was from Vegårshei Municipality in Aust-Agder county.

Until 2006, French served in the Norwegian Armed Forces and was also enlisted in the British Army where he trained as a paratrooper. In 2006, he was admitted to the Telemark Battalion, a Norwegian Army mechanised infantry unit, but was allegedly forced to resign in 2007 as he and Moland were accused of having recruited military personnel into employment with private security companies.

Moland also had a Norwegian Army background, having served in The King's Guard and later the Telemark Battalion, where he held the rank of second lieutenant before his resignation in 2007. French and Moland later worked as security guards in several places, including as pirate guards for a Korean company in the Gulf of Aden. They were also involved in security missions in various African countries, including Angola, Sierra Leone, and finally the Democratic Republic of the Congo.

French and Moland were employed by SIG Uganda, a security company started by Moland.

== Prosecution evidence ==
During the criminal investigation, the Congolese authorities found Norwegian military ID cards, counterfeit United Nations caps, and employee ID badges with both the correct and false names of French and Moland. The employee badges were from a little-known security company named Special Interventions Group (SIG) which is owned by and mostly staffed by Norwegians. The investigators also found SIG-Uganda employee ID badges which bore the identical SIG logo and the false names of "John Hunt" and "Mike Callan" accompanying French and Moland's respective photographs. During a raid on French and Moland's apartment, authorities also confiscated at least one rifle and a camera containing images of the two on their travels in Africa. In one image, believed to have been taken by French, Moland is seen smiling as he washes what is alleged to be the blood of Abedi Kasongo from the inside of their car. French and Moland said that Kasongo was murdered by gunmen who attacked them on a road.

Two witnesses, Gina Kepo Aila and Kasimu Aradjabo, said they were both present during the killing. Both told the court that Moland shot Abedi Kasongo, while French threw himself over Aila, whom he tried to kill. According to both witnesses, several shots were fired, most probably three.

== Verdict ==
On September 8, 2009, French and Moland were found guilty on all counts and sentenced to death. Along with the death sentence for both, the tribunal ordered the Norwegian government to pay a US$1 compensation to each Congolese citizen, an amount Judge Claude Disimo, head of the military tribunal, said totals more than US$60 million. The prosecution had sought the death penalty for the five charges made against the men. Norwegian authorities have denied that the men were involved in espionage for Norway, and have expressed concern they were not receiving a fair trial. Initially the Congolese claims of compensation had amounted to more than US$500 billion.

The men appealed their conviction on September 9, 2009. On April 22, 2010, the BBC reported that the convictions had been overturned on the basis of flawed procedures at their military tribunal.

A new trial with different judges found the pair guilty of murder and espionage on June 10, 2010. They were again sentenced to death and the Norwegian State was ordered to pay $65m.

Although it remains on the statute books, the death penalty is currently not applied in the Democratic Republic of the Congo. The last known execution occurred in 2003, and today capital punishment is usually commuted to life imprisonment.

== Reaction ==
Norway immediately condemned the sentence and rejected the allegations of espionage. Foreign Minister Jonas Gahr Støre said the sentence was "completely unacceptable" and that he would protest to his Congolese counterpart. "We wish to distance ourselves from the conviction of espionage on Norway's behalf," Støre said. "We also wish to distance ourselves from the court's decision that the Norwegian State is responsible for paying damages. Norway is not a party in this case."

French and Moland's defence lawyer, Guillaume Likwela, said the verdict was flawed because the trial was carried out in French, which neither defendant spoke, but no interpreter was provided. A spokesman for the oil company Tullow Oil, which operates in the region, pointed out that French and Moland's "unprofessionalism and amateur behavior" were indicators that they were not foreign agents as the prosecutor claimed. Øistein Mjærum, an advisor to former Norwegian prime minister Kjell Magne Bondevik, called the two defendants "idiots".

The case was widely covered in the Norwegian media, which described much of the evidence presented against French and Moland as "contradictory and seemingly absurd", such as a photo of Rune Folkedal, a photographer in Drammens Tidende, a Norwegian regional newspaper, wearing a beret and pointing at Africa, in which Folkedal was named as French and Moland's commander for their claimed operation in the Congo. There were, however, also indications that French and Moland received fairer treatment from the military tribunal than would have been the case with a civil court. The Swedish newspaper Dagens Nyheter reported a former political advisor to the UN peace mission to the Congo (MONUC) as saying that it appeared evidence existed for the charges and that the trial was procedurally correct. However, she also said that since the rule of law in the country leaves much to be desired, the verdict should be "taken with a grain of salt".

Reprieve and Clive Stafford Smith were involved in the case. After Moland's death in 2013, The Washington Post said that Reprieve had "sharply criticized the conviction of the two, pointing out there was no physical evidence against the men and that two people were paid to testify against them."

The case was discussed again as part of the Democratic Republic of the Congo–Norway relations during meetings on April 1, 2011, and the following day between Gunvor Alida Endresen (Minister Counsellor at Norway's embassy in Angola) and authorities in Kinshasa. The diplomat visited both prisoners on December 3, 2011 (after their transfer to Ndolo prison). On 17 May 2017, French was released from prison and was allowed to return to Norway on humanitarian and health grounds.
