= Artillery Battalion (Norway) =

- Artilleribataljonen
- Insignia of the Artillery Battalion
- Active: 1953–present
- Country: Norway
- Branch: Army
- Type: Field artillery
- Role: Indirect fire support
- Size: Battalion
- Part of: Brigade Nord
- Garrison/HQ: Setermoen Leir
- Mottos: Norwegian: Gjør rett, frykt ingen English: Do right, fear none
- Colours: Blue beret
- Anniversaries: Celebration of Saint Barbara on December 4
- Equipment: K9 Thunder self-propelled howitzers

Commanders
- Current commander: Lieutenant Colonel Mats W. Dyrstad

Insignia
- Standard

The Artillery Battalion (Norwegian: Artilleribataljonen) is a combat support unit in the Norwegian army, as a part of the Northern brigade. The unit numbers 560 soldiers and officers. (Note: 380 conscripts and 180 enlisted personnel.) As the brigade's artillery battalion, its mission is to provide fire support for land operations through field artillery, air support and ship artillery. The Artillery Battalion also provides personnel for national preparedness and operations abroad. The battalion has its headquarters in Setermoen camp in Troms county and one battery in Rena camp in Innlandet county.

The battalion's main weapons are K9 Thunder self-propelled howitzers and NASAMS III air-defence system.

== History ==
=== Early formation in Allied Occupied Germany (1947–1953) ===
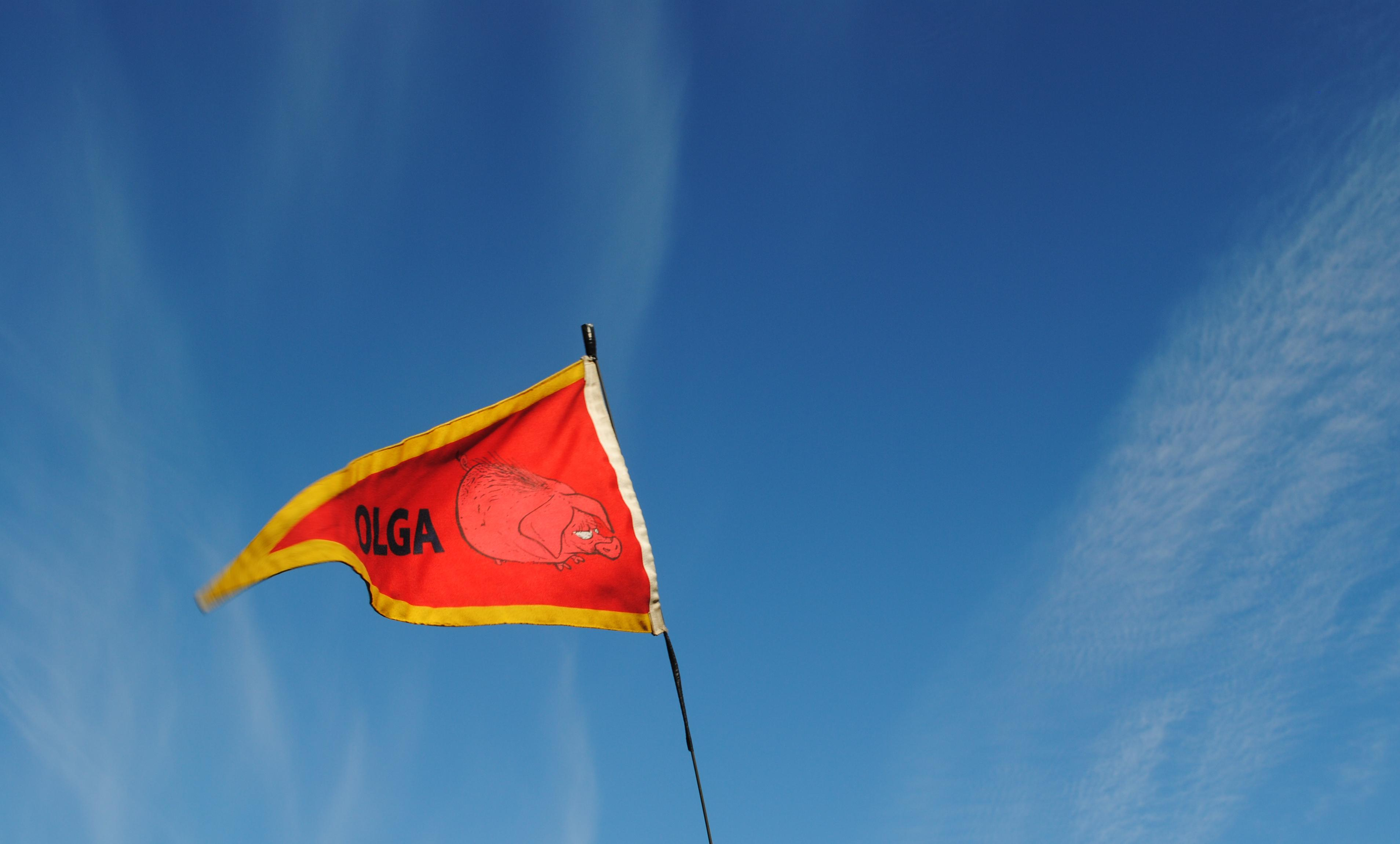
During the stay in Germany, Battery Olga adopted a wild boar piglet that had lost its parents to poachers. The boar was named Corporal Oscar and became the battery's mascot. Since then, the unit pennant of Battery Olga has been the pig, drawn by author Kjell Aukrust.

The Artillery Battalion is a continuation of the Field Artillery Regiment, which served under the Independent Norwegian Brigade Group, Norway's force participation in the post-war occupation of Germany from 1947 to 1953. The regiment consisted of two companies, Battery Nils and Battery Olga.

=== Relocate into the new brigade (1953–1996) ===
After the service in Post-War Germany, the Field Artillery Regiment was relocated to Setermoen in 1953, subsequently reorganised as the Field Artillery Battalion as a part of the new brigade in Northern-Norway. After relocating to Norway, the battalion started to use the M7 105 mm field howitzer and the M114 155 mm field howitzer.

In 1964, the battalion was reinforced one canon battery, Canon Battery Petter, which provided support for the newly established infantry battalion. The following years, the battalion also acquired modernised equipment. Five new M113 armoured wagons were assigned to Battery Nils for radio communication. In 1969, the M109A3GNM field howitzer replaced the self-propelled M7 105 mm field howitzers.

At the end of the Cold War and the collapse of the Soviet Union, numerous units in the Army were disbanded from 1995 onwards. As early as 1993, the battalion was downsized with two batteries, leaving only Canon Battery Nils left.

=== Reformation and modernisation (1996–2024) ===
In the early stages of the 2000s, the battalion was quite reduced in terms of personnel size and equipment level. Despite the budget cuts the previous years, the battalion acquires rocket artillery in 1997. In 2006, Battery Petter was re-established, now as Battery Piraya, and was assigned to Telemark Battalion at Rena as part of the new Rapid Reaction Force of the Norwegian Army. It is also the only gun battery in the battalion to field exclusively professional soldiers. Battery Olga was also reformed the same year, and the battery commander, captain Tom Patrick Scarlett, was given a new wild boar piglet as a ceremonial gift. The new piglet was named Corporal Oscar II, inheriting the rank of its predecessor and also enjoying the mandatory salutes of soldiers serving in the battery.

In August 2018, the mobile air defence was restored, establishing a new air defence battery as a part of the Artillery Battalion. The new air defence will consist of ACSV G5 armoured combat support vehicles with the AIM-9X short-range missile and Humvee utility vehicles with AMRAAM missile for the NASAM system. The Air Defence Battery is stationed at Setermoen garrison. However, the battery will eventually have personnel further north in Finnmark.

In 2020, after years of service, the previous M109A3GNM field howitzer was replaced by the new K9 Thunder field howitzer replaced. In total, the army has acquired 24 new K9 Thunder wagons.

== Organisation ==
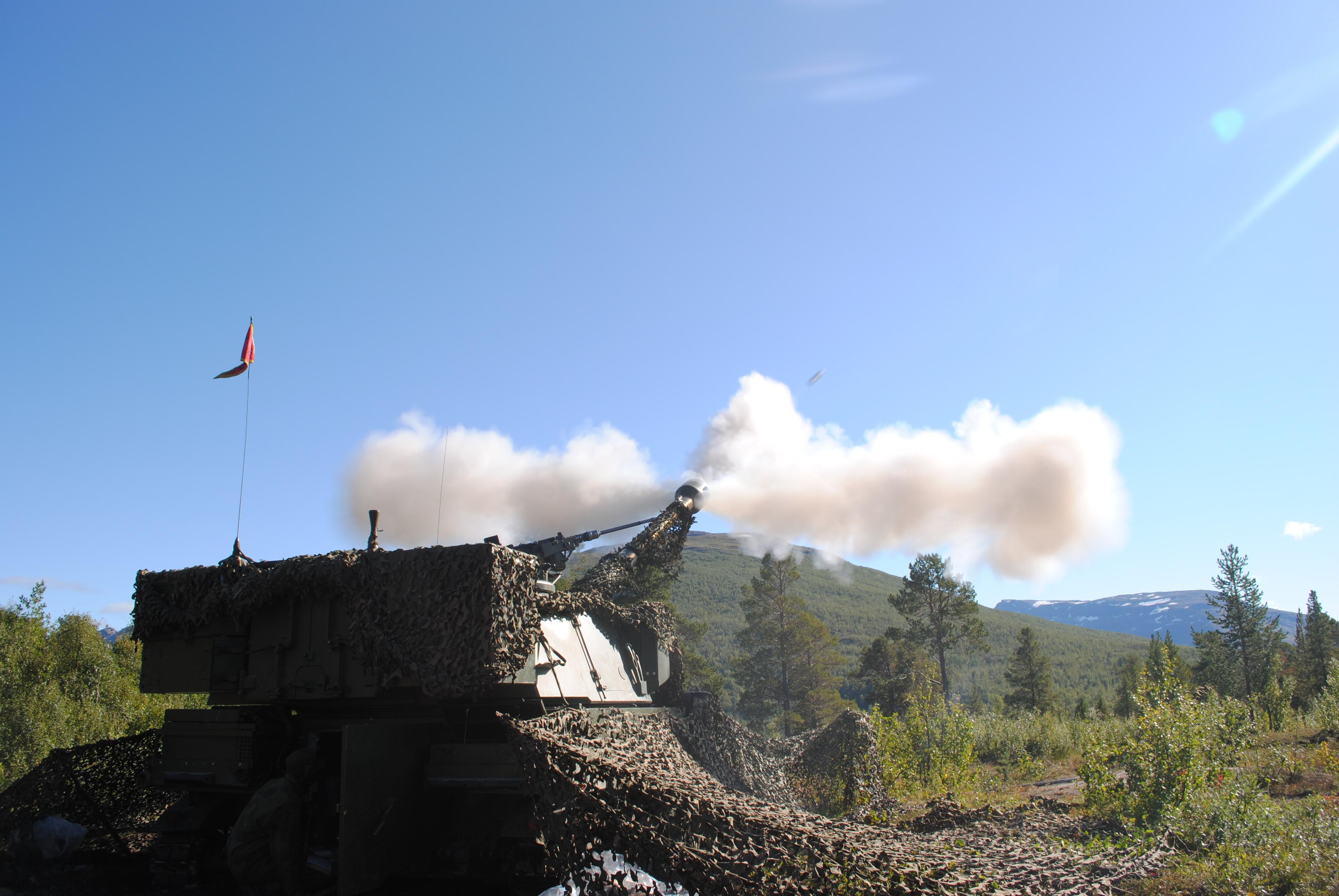
One of the battalion's M109 in action during an exercise in 2010. This system has been replaced by the K9 Thunder self-propelled howitzer.

The battalion consists of six batteries:

- Cannon Battery Nils
- Cannon Battery Olga
- Cannon Battery Piraya (Note: This battery was previously named Petter; as of 2006 it's called Piraya)
- Staff Battery
- Reconnaissance Battery
- Air Defence Battery

The battalion's three main gun batteries, Nils, Olga, and Petter, provides artillery support to the main combat battalions in the brigade, the Armoured Battalion, 2n Battalion and Telemark Battalion. Nils and Olga are situated at Setermoen Camp, while Petter is situated at Rena. Batteries Nils and Olga are conscription units. Soldiers who have completed their initial service here can apply to Battery Petter, which is a fully professionalised unit with enlisted personnel.

The gun batteries each have a gun platoon (manning the howitzers), an OP platoon (Observation Post platoon, moving with the unit being supported and acquiring targets) and a command platoon (collects and processes data, issues firing data).

The staff battery consists of support and supply personnel. They provide the gun batteries with the resources they need to fight (ammunition, distance, elevation and weather data and security). In addition, they garrison Setermoen camp and serves as guards and medics during exercises.

The Reconnaissance Battery comprises two artillery ranger platoons. The rangers move in forward positions and conduct surveillance and target acquisition mission, providing joint tactical air co-ordination.

The battalion also has a WLS-platoon, that is used in counter-battery fire. When enemy artillery fires, the WLS radar detects the projectile and uses its trajectory to calculate where it was fired from. This data is then sent to the ILS and the cannon battery staffs, which in turn use this to coordinate the cannons in an effort to take out the enemy battery.
