= Camp Viking (disambiguation) =

Camp Viking is a British military training establishment inside the Arctic Circle in northern Norway.

Camp Viking may also previously refer to:

- Camp Viking, part of the Red Beach Base Area during the Vietnam War
- Camp Viking, the Danish section of Camp Bastion during the War in Afghanistan
