= Mordene i Kongo =

2018 Norwegian action film by Marius Holst

- Directed by: Marius Holst
- Written by: Stephen Uhlander
- Produced by: Marlow De Mardt; Christian Fredrik Martin; Asle Vatn
- Starring: Aksel Hennie; Tobias Santelmann; Ine F. Jansen; Dennis Storhøi; Tone Danielsen; Anthony Oseyemi
- Cinematography: John Andreas Andersen
- Edited by: Olivier Bugge Coutté; Søren B. Ebbe; Vidar Flataukan; Sverrir Kristjánsson
- Music by: Johannes Ringen; Johan Söderqvist
- Production companies: Friland Produksjon AS; Garagefilm International; DO Productions
- Distributed by: RFF Real Fiction Filmverleih
- Release date: 26 October 2018 (Norway)
- Running time: 122 minutes
- Country: Norway
- Languages: Norwegian; English
- Box office: $1,533,390

Mordene i Kongo, theatrically as Congo, is a 2018 Norwegian crime film directed by Marius Holst and co-produced by Christian Fredrik Martin and Asle Vatn with South African producer Marlow De Mardt. The film stars Aksel Hennie and Tobias Santelmann in lead roles whereas Ine F. Jansen, Dennis Storhøi, Tone Danielsen and Anthony Oseyemi made supportive roles.

The film was shot in South Africa, and revolves around two Norwegian adventurers, Joshua French and Tjostolv Moland, who are accused of killing their hired chauffeur just before crossing into the eastern part of the Democratic Republic of Congo. The film received mixed reviews from critics. The lead actor Tobias Santelmann was awarded Best Male actor in the Amanda Award 2019. The film was also nominated for Best Photo, Best Sound Design and the People's Amanda sections.

== Cast ==
- Aksel Hennie as Joshua French
- Tobias Santelmann as Tjostolv Moland
- Ine F. Jansen as Ane Strøm Olsen
- Dennis Storhøi as Morten Furuholmen
- Tone Danielsen as Kari Hilde French
- Anthony Oseyemi as General Joseph Kazumba
- Wanga Jawar as Serge Kabondo
- Hakeem Kae-Kazim as Victor Makuni
- Franck Kalala as Katenda Nkulu
- Charles Richard Katanga as Pierre Mawa
- Monda Kinkela as Kisimo Aradjabo
- Tuks Tad Lungu as Congolese Soldier
- Patrick Madise as Abedi Kasongo
- Sipho Mathashala as Gina Kepo Aila
- Jean Serge Ngandu as Pierre Agabo
- Tumelo Nkwanca as Bibiche Olendjeke
- Benike Palfi as Girl - Backpacker's Hostel
- Milton Schorr as German Backpacker
- Christoffer Staib as Halvard Mo

== International screening ==
- Denmark – 29 May 2019
- Sweden – 15 December 2019 (TV premiere)
- Germany – 6 February 2020
- Hungary – 6 June 2020 (internet)
