= Camp Viking =

Royal Marines arctic training establishment in Norway

Coordinates: 69°01′29.1″N 19°16′51″E

Camp Viking
- Øverbygd, Målselv Municipality in Norway

Site information
- Type: Royal Marines winter training base, forward operating base
- Owner: Government of Norway
- Operator: Ministry of Defence (UK)
- Controlled by: Royal Navy
- Open to the public: no
- Condition: active
- Previously known as: Camp Orange (during former Dutch military occupancy)

Site history
- Built: March 2023; 3 years ago
- Built for: British Armed Forces

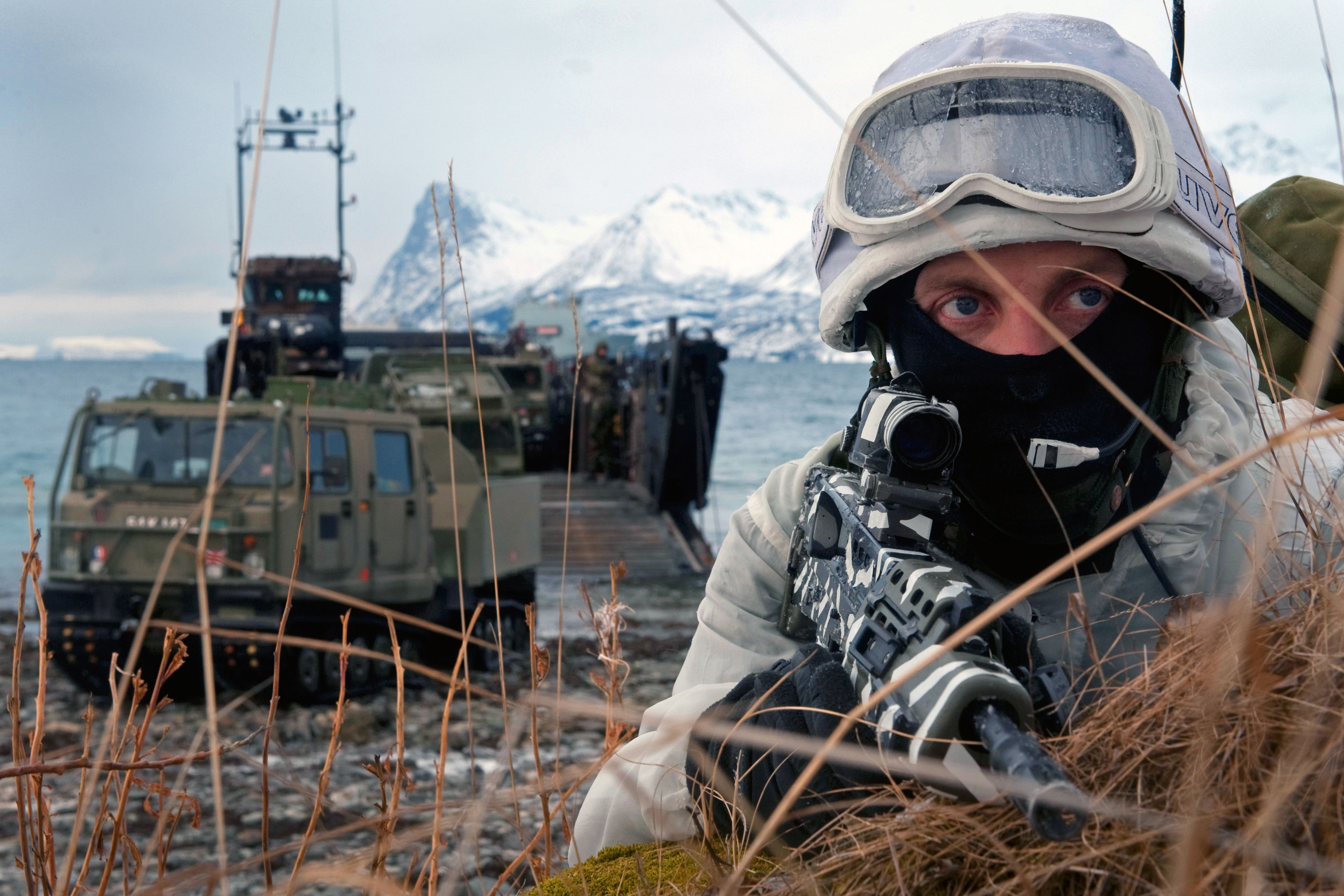
Royal Marines Zulu Company, 45 Commando, during an amphibious landing in Norway.

Camp Viking is a British military facility located in Øverbygd, northern Norway which opened in March 2023 to support military operations in the High North. It primarily hosts the Royal Marines and Army Commandos.

== History ==
Camp Viking was established in March 2023 and acts as the United Kingdom's main operations hub for the High North. Previously known as Camp Orange under Dutch occupation, it was substantially rebuilt for British use and given the name Camp Viking. It is primarily used by the Royal Marines and Army Commandos for Arctic warfare and mountain warfare training, along with testing new equipment. It is also used as an operational support hub for British and NATO forces operating in the Arctic and Baltic Sea regions, including the Royal Navy's Littoral Response Group (North) amphibious task group.

Located approximately 40 miles (64 kilometres) south of Tromsø, the facility is strategically located near Skjold garrison of the Norwegian Army, the Bardufoss Air Station (which is used by the Commando Helicopter Force), and a seaport in Sørreisa. From March 2023, approximately 1,000 Royal Marines had been deployed to the base.

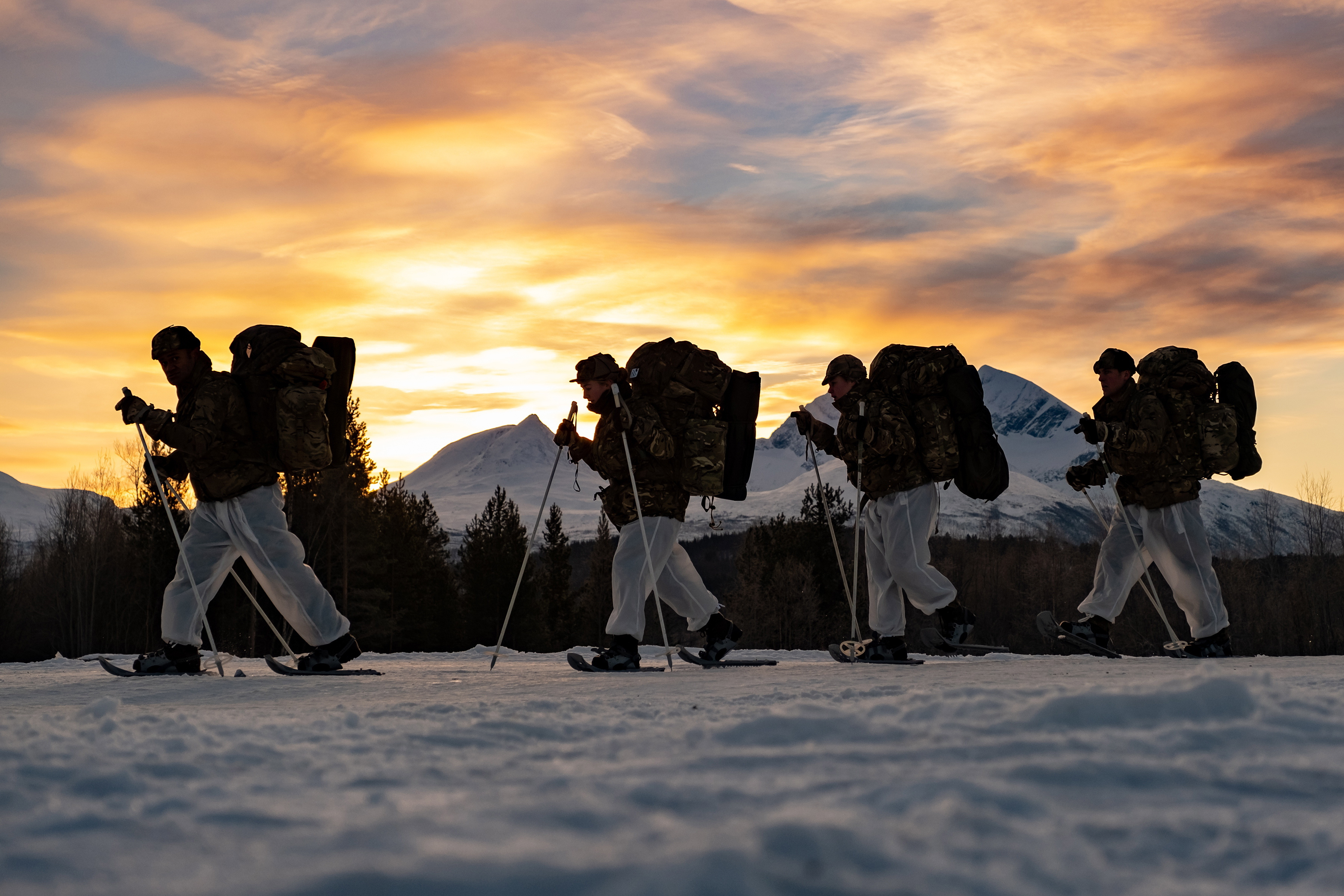
Commando Forces during their Cold Weather Survival Course near Bardufoss, Norway.

Under the terms of the lease signed by the Government of Norway and the UK Ministry of Defence, Camp Viking is to remain open for ten years. As Norway has a long-established policy to oppose foreign military bases on its soil to avoid provocations with Russia, the presence of Camp Viking is politically sensitive, with the Norwegian government insisting that it is not a new wholly-British military base but instead a rebranding of an existing training facility within a Norwegian military base. Nevertheless, the facility was described as a military 'base' in press releases by the Royal Navy.

== In popular culture ==
Camp Viking was the subject of a two-part Channel 4 programme titled Guy Martin: Arctic Warrior in 2024, in which presenter Guy Martin is embedded with the Royal Marines to test himself against British military Arctic training exercises as a commando.

== See also ==
- Exercise Joint Warrior – British-hosted tri-service biannual multi-national military exercise, which includes Exercise Joint Viking now supported by Camp Viking
- Exercise Nordic Response – biannual multi-national military training exercise
