= Morten Strøksnes =

Norwegian journalist, writer and photographer

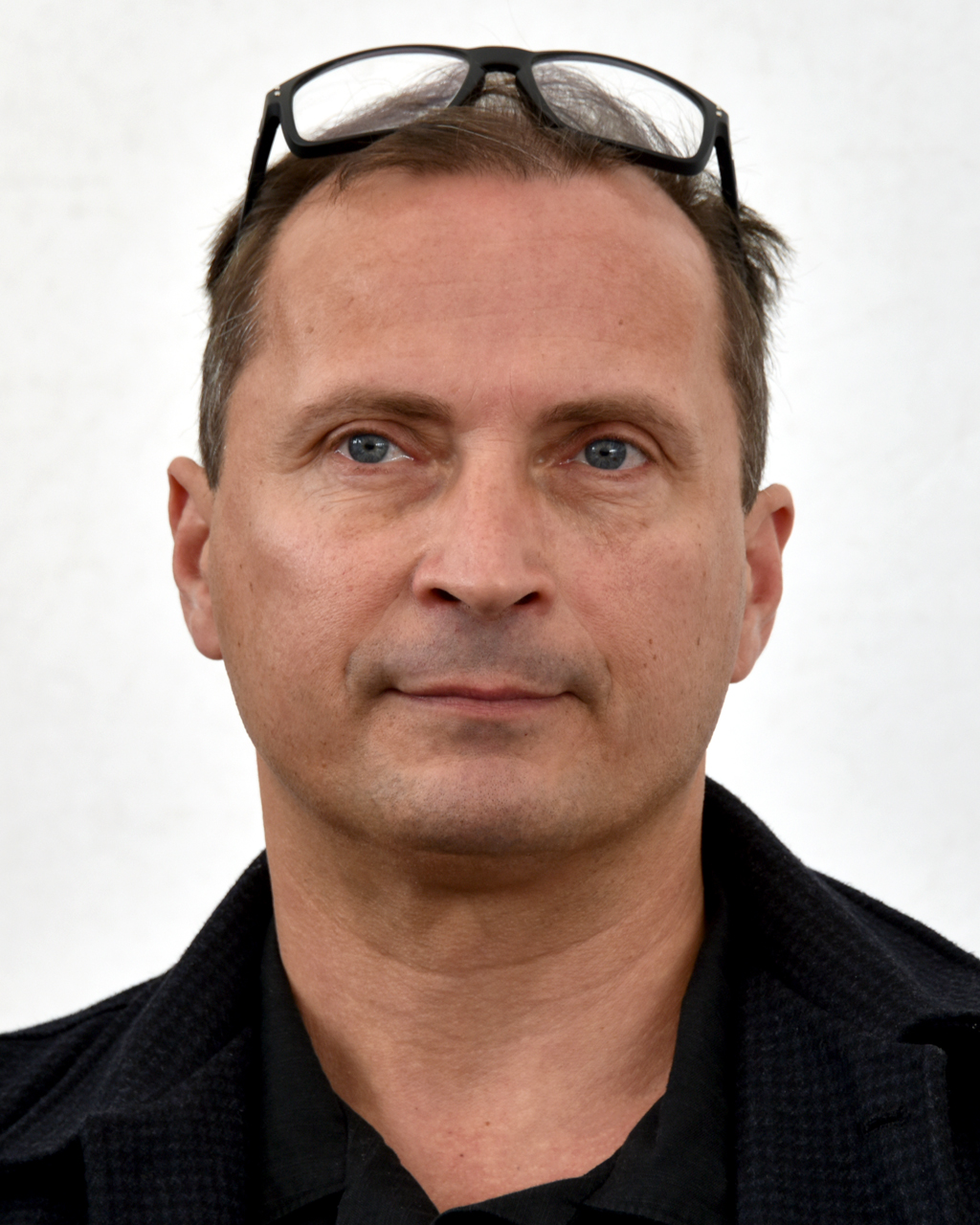
- Morten Strøksnes (2019)
- Born: 30 November 1965 (age 60); Kirkenes, Norway
- Occupations: journalist and non-fiction writer
- Notable work: Shark Drunk
- Awards: Brage Prize (2015); Norwegian Critics Prize for Literature (2015); Wanderlust Adventure Travel Book of the Year (2018)

Morten Andreas Strøksnes (born 30 November 1965) is a Norwegian journalist and non-fiction writer.

== Personal life ==
Strøksnes was born in Kirkenes on 30 November 1965.

== Career ==
His books include Hellig grunn from 2001, Snøen som falt i fjor from 2004, Automobil – Gjennom Europas Bakgård from 2005, Et mord i Kongo from 2010, about Tjostolv Moland and Joshua French, and Tequiladagbøkene – Gjennom Sierra Madre from 2012.

For his 2015 book Havboka he was awarded both the Brage Prize and the Norwegian Critics Prize for Literature. As of 2018 the book has been sold to 24 countries, and the English translation (titled Shark Drunk) was awarded the British Wanderlust Adventure Travel Book of the Year in 2018.

== Bibliography ==
- Hellig grunn (2001)
- Snøen som falt i fjor (2004)
- Automobil – Gjennom Europas Bakgård (2005)
- Et mord i Kongo (2010)
- Tequiladagbøkene – Gjennom Sierra Madre (2012)
- Havboka – eller Kunsten å fange en kjempehai fra en gummibåt på et stort hav gjennom fire årstider (2015)
- Lumholtz gjenferd (2022)

Awards
Preceded by Marte Michelet	Recipient of the Brage Prize for prose 2015	Succeeded by Åsne Seierstad
