= Joshua French =

Norwegian-born security contractor and former soldier

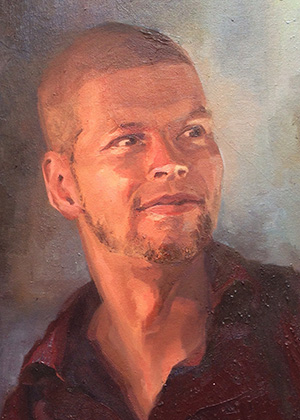
- Born: Joshua Olav Daniel Hodne French; 7 April 1982 (age 44); Re, Vestfold, Norway
- Citizenship: British and Norwegian dual citizenship
- Occupation: Security contractor (former)
- Status: Released in 2017
- Convictions: Murder, espionage
- Penalty: Death
- Accomplice: Tjostolv Moland

Details
- Victims: Abedi Kasongo, 47
- Date apprehended: May 2009
- Imprisoned at: Kisangani, DR Congo (2009–2017)

Joshua Olav Daniel Hodne French (born 7 April 1982) is a Norwegian-British man who was convicted of murder in the Democratic Republic of the Congo. He worked as a security contractor with his friend Tjostolv Moland when they were arrested in May 2009, and he was later convicted of attempted murder, armed robbery, the formation of a criminal association and espionage for Norway, of which he and Moland were found guilty and sentenced to death. In 2014 he was also convicted of the murder of Moland. He was released in 2017 after serving 8 years of his sentence, and returned to Norway.

The trial caused controversy in Norway and Europe, as his mother claimed a lack of physical evidence, and "a clear economic motive from the Congolese government".

== Biography ==
=== Early life ===
Joshua French grew up in Re Municipality in Norway's Vestfold county. His mother is Norwegian and his father is British. French has dual Norwegian and British citizenship.

French served in the Norwegian Armed Forces until 2006 and was also trained as a paratrooper in the British Army. In 2006, he was admitted to the Telemark Battalion, the Norwegian Army's elite infantry unit, but was fired in 2007 when he and Moland were accused of having recruited military personnel into employment with private security companies. He has not had any military affiliation since 2007.

=== Murder and conviction ===
After resigning from the army, French and Moland continued working in the private security sector, specializing in contracts in Africa. On 5 May 2009, their hired driver, 47-year-old Abedi Kasongo, was shot and killed near Bafwasende, Tshopo District, Orientale Province, Democratic Republic of Congo. French was arrested on 9 May in the Epulu game reserve, around 200 kilometres (120 mi) from Kisangani. Moland was arrested two days later in the Ituri Province, a few hundred kilometres farther northeast. The men claimed that their driver was murdered by gunmen who waylaid them, and claimed they had escaped the site due to fear that the gunmen would return for them.

On 8 September 2009, they were both found guilty and sentenced to death by a military tribunal in the regional capital, Kisangani. The DRC government considered the defendants to be active duty Norwegian soldiers, contradicting the Norwegian government's insistence that they had had no connection with Norway's military since 2007. French also claimed that an autopsy was not performed on the murder victim. In 2014 French was also convicted of the murder of Moland. The trial received massive media coverage in Norway, with several forensic and legal experts calling for the Norwegian government to interfere with what they considered a "theatrical trial" in an attempt to extort money from the government.

=== Post-conviction and Moland's death ===
French and Moland began serving their sentence in Kisingani in 2009. While they were sentenced to death the execution of prisoners is uncommon in Congo and the sentence was by many considered "life in prison" rather than death. In 2011, they were transferred from the prison in Kisigani to the Ndolo prison in Kinshasa.

During a state visit to DRC in 2013 French President Francois Hollande suggested that French and Moland should be moved from their six-man prison cell. Five days later the two prisoners were transferred to a shared "private" cell. Britain's Foreign Ministry had requested intervention by Hollande, given French's status as a British national. Later the same year, Bård Vegar Solhjell (Norwegian Minister of the Environment), who was in DRC for talks on rain forest projects, discussed the prisoners with authorities hoping to push for a potential transfer to a prison in Norway.

On 18 August 2013, Moland was found dead in his cell. French, who slept with ear-plugs, had noticed that Moland got out of bed. When Moland did not return from the adjoining bathroom French woke up and found his cellmate dead. The prison officials were notified at daybreak four hours later and opened up an investigation. DRC's minister of communications, Lambert Mende Omalanga, said that "we're trying to determine whether it was suicide or homicide. It looks like suicide but we're not sure".

Soon after Moland's death rumors in DRC suggested that French may have been involved in Moland's death. In response to this speculation, Norway sent a team of investigators from Kripos together with a forensic pathologist to Kinshasa. A DRC official, General Major Tim Mukuntu, said that "we don't need the Norwegian investigators, but to show openness towards the Norwegians, we have said that it is ok that they come" but that DRC will still lead the investigation. Norway's Foreign Ministry also posted a senior diplomat and press liaison officer to Kinshasa. French made a statement welcoming the arrival of the Norwegian investigation team. The DRC minister of justice, Wivine Mumba Matipa, said "that she decided that Norwegian investigators had to participate during the investigation, so that speculation would stop." Matipa also wanted an observer from EU alongside the Norwegians.

Following the death, Morten Furuholmen, former lawyer for the two prisoners, said that "there should have been more activity from the highest levels of politics, including meeting in Congo. Norway's Foreign Ministry limited contacts with congolese authorities to short meetings during UN sessions in New York, together with one contact in Ethiopia. There haven't been meetings in Congo as far as I know".

In December 2013, Congolese authorities charged French with the murder of Moland by strangulation. According to the charges, French drugged Moland before the murder. The charges were met with surprise by Norwegian police and civil authorities. The Norwegian investigators had concluded that Moland had "beyond doubt" committed suicide. In May 2014, French was found guilty and given a second death sentence.

During his incarceration, French's health declined drastically and he made several escape attempts to get medical treatment. In January 2016, French fell seriously ill and was hospitalized. He returned to prison six months later. During this time, negotiations continued to win his release or a prison transfer to Norway.

=== Release and return ===
After serving eight years in DR Congo, French was released on 17 May 2017 and returned to Norway the next day. In the official statement, the release is attributed to "health and family grounds". The process of having him transferred to Norway had begun several weeks before, but was not made public until after the plane carrying French had landed on Norwegian soil. French has always claimed his innocence, and maintains that both he and Moland were wrongfully convicted. Upon his return to Norway, French was hospitalized and treated in isolation for infections caused by multi-resistant bacteria. He was released from hospital in August 2017, and is currently residing at a hidden location with family members.

== Documentary film ==
Congolese film director Djo Munga began working on a documentary film about French and Moland, originally slated for a 2014 release. Munga said that "media has been one sided and unfair to Congo in their coverage of this case. So in this film I will start by showing who the Congolese are and what they care about". As of October 2017, the film has not yet been released.

The 2018 Norwegian film Mordene i Kongo was released giving a dramatized account of the events. As of 2018, French is giving a series of talks about his experiences, and is also working on a book.
