= Tjostolv Moland =

Norwegian army officer & security contractor

- Born: 28 February 1981; Vegårshei, Aust-Agder, Norway
- Died: 18 August 2013 (aged 32); Prison Militaire Ndolo, Kinshasa, DR Congo
- Convictions: Murder, espionage
- Penalty: Death

Details
- Victims: One
- Country: DR Congo
- Date apprehended: May 2009

Tjostolv Moland (28 February 1981 – 18 August 2013) was a Norwegian former army officer and private security contractor. He was arrested in May 2009 in the Democratic Republic of the Congo (DRC), and convicted (together with Joshua French) of murdering their driver and spying for Norway. He died in prison in the DRC, in what was believed to be a suicide.

== Early life ==
Moland was born and raised in Vegårshei Municipality in Aust-Agder county, Norway. He joined the army when he was nineteen, served in The King's Guard and later the Telemark Battalion, where he held the rank of second lieutenant before his resignation in 2007. During his tenure as an army officer, he befriended grenadier Joshua French, a fellow soldier in the Telemark Battalion. After leaving the military, they both worked in the private security industry for a Korean company as security guards in the Gulf of Aden.

== 2009 Congo trial ==
In 2009, a manhunt ensued after Moland and French were suspected in the shooting of their driver, who was found dead in the car in which the three had been riding. The men claimed that their driver was murdered by gunmen who waylaid them, and that they escaped from them on foot. On 8 September 2009, a DRC military tribunal in Kisangani (the capital of Orientale Province) found them both guilty of all charges and sentenced them to death. The Democratic Republic of the Congo government insisted that the defendants were active-duty Norwegian soldiers, contradicting Norway's insistence that they had had no connection with its military since 2007.

== Appeal and new trial ==
On 22 April 2010, a court overturned the convictions of French and Moland because of flawed procedures at their military tribunal and ordered a new trial with different judges.

On 10 June 2010, the BBC reported that the new trial in Kisangani had found them guilty of murder and espionage. They were again sentenced to death and the Norwegian State was ordered to pay $65m.

== Imprisonment ==
During their first trial, the men were incarcerated in Kisangani, where they also remained for the first year of their sentence. In 2010, they were transferred to a prison in Kinshasa. In 2011, their prison cell was searched by officials including major Jean-Blaise Bwamulunda, one of the prosecutors in the trial. US$2,000 in cash was found and confiscated.

== Diplomatic meetings in Democratic Republic of Congo ==
In 2013, on his visit to the DRC, French president François Hollande suggested that French and Moland should be moved out of their six-man prison cell; five days later the two prisoners were moved to a cell of their own. Britain's foreign ministry had contacted France's in advance, due to Joshua French holding British as well as Norwegian citizenship.)

== Death ==
On 18 August 2013, at 4 a.m. local time, Moland was found dead by French. French, who slept with ear plugs, had noticed that Moland got out of bed, but when he did not return from the adjoining bathroom, he woke up and found his cellmate dead. The prison officials were notified four hours later, and began investigating. DRC's minister of communications, Lambert Mende Omalanga, said that "We're trying to determine whether it was suicide or homicide. It looks like suicide but we're not sure". Moland's death was confirmed at a press conference by Norway's foreign minister Espen Barth Eide, who also reported that the cause of death was not yet known. The Norwegian government dispatched a four-man criminal team the following day, to assist the investigation in Congo.

On 20 August, French stated in an interview with VG that Moland had been active and in good health up until his death, doing his daily exercises and jogging in the courtyard just a few hours earlier. Eight days later, on 28 August 2013, Congolese authorities and Norwegian pathologists concluded that Moland had committed suicide. In December 2013, French was charged with drugging and murdering Moland, accusations that led to statements of surprise by Norwegian authorities.

=== Reactions ===
Morten Furuholmen, a former lawyer of the two prisoners, said "My opinion has been that there should have been more activity from the highest levels of politics, including meeting in Congo. Norway's foreign ministry has limited itself to short meetings during UN sessions in New York, together with one contact in Ethiopia. There haven't been any meetings in Congo as far as I know".

Prime Minister Jens Stoltenberg told Dagbladet that the death "is deeply tragic".

On 20 August 2013 an Aftenposten editorial wrote that "...some are of the opinion that Norway ought to be able to pay itself out of the troubles. In our opinion such suggestions are overly simplistic. - One must also ask oneself what sort of example that would set for similar incidents in the future; and if Norwegian citizens' safety in critical situations are best cared for through generous ransom payments." Dagbladet's editorial said "...if Norwegian authorities had agreed to pay what was necessary to get Moland and French home to Norway, it would have endangered all Norwegians traveling to similar nations. Norwegian citizens visiting corrupt or lawless countries would have their market value increased. They could become commodities. Therefore such cases demand quiet diplomacy." An editorial in Tvedestrandsposten—the newspaper where Moland's family placed the death notice—called for an independent investigation of Norway's foreign ministry.

Jonas Gahr Støre, Norway's foreign minister at the time of Moland and French's arrest and conviction, said "... I understand, of course, that those that lost their son [assign] blame for that it was not possible to help them, and I am very saddened that we were not able to do that".

Morten Strøksnes, author of Et mord i Kongo ["A murder in Congo"]—and journalist—said in a 20 August 2013 article in Bergens Tidende that when his death was made public, "Moland again became the main story in all Norwegian media. The foreign minister and the prime minister announced press conferences. A prisoner on death row in an African prison, and the nation's top leadership hastily announces and holds press conferences on a Sunday! - The foreign minister said that they could have done more. The prime minister said that they had worked hard. He sent a letter 'not too long ago'. But the letter was sent in March 2012." ... "Norway has erased [Norwegian kroner] 143 million of Congo's debt, and also funded the nation with another half billion for conservation of rainforest in Congo - without demanding anything in return. - It is easy to imagine how the Congolese have interpreted this: Either as an admission of guilt, or as a signal that Norwegian authorities did not wish that the prisoners should be transferred to their homeland."
