= Survivor Africa: Panama =

- Presented by: Anthony Oseyemi
- No. of days: 29
- No. of castaways: 12
- Winner: Tsholofelo 'Tebby' Gasennelwe
- Runner-up: Jeremiah Zulu
- Location: Pearl Islands, Panama

Release
- Original network: M-Net
- Original release: September 3 – November 19, 2006

Survivor Africa: Panama is the first pan-regional season of the television show Survivor to air in central or southern Africa. It included contestants from the countries of Botswana, Ethiopia, Ghana, Kenya, Namibia, Nigeria, Zambia, and Zimbabwe. The show was broadcast on the channel M-Net from September 3, 2006 to November 19, 2006 over twelve episodes. The host for the season was Anthony Oseyemi The grand prize was $100,000 US Dollars and was won by Tsholofelo 'Tebby' Gasennelwe.

== Contestants ==
List of Survivor Africa: Panama contestants
Contestant	Original Tribe	Merged Tribe	Finish
Chipo Nzonzo; 35, Harare, Zimbabwe	Kuna		1st Voted Out; Day 3
Ariomawha "Ario" Okenabirhie; 32, Warri, Nigeria	Embera		2nd Voted out Day 6
Lloyd Kalipinde; 25, Lusaka, Zambia	Kuna		3rd Voted out Day 9
Frieda Karipi; 29, Windhoek, Namibia	Kuna		4th Voted out Day 12
Yagazie "Yaga" Chuwumerje; 23, Lagos, Nigeria	Kuna	Nagual	5th Voted out 1st Jury Member; Day 14
Nana Sarpong; 30, Accra, Ghana	Kuna	Nagual	6th Voted out 2nd Jury Member; Day 16
Leonard Mapuranga; 24, Harare, Zimbabwe	Embera	Nagual	7th Voted out 3rd Jury Member; Day 18
Derrick Assetto; 29, Nairobi, Kenya	Embera	Nagual	8th Voted out 4th Jury Member; Day 20
Metasebia "Meti" Yilma; 27, Dire Dawa, Ethiopia	Kuna	Nagual	Lost Challenge; 5th Jury Member; Day 21
Olanike "Nike" Gbolahan; 24, Lagos, Nigeria	Embera	Nagual	Lost Challenge; 6th Jury Member; Day 21
Jeremiah Zulu; 26, Lusaka, Zambia	Embera	Nagual	Runner-Up; Day 21
Tsholofelo "Tebby" Gasenelwe; 24, Gaborone, Botswana	Embera	Nagual	Sole Survivor; Day 21

== Season summary ==
The contestants for this season were initially split into two tribes: Embera, named after Panama's semi-nomadic and heavily body-painted tribe, whose buffs were blue, and Kuna, named after a traditionally matriarchal and politically organised people of Panama, whose buffs were red. During the pre-merge portion of the game, Embera won a majority of the reward and immunity challenges, while Kuna saw their numbers dwindle from six to three. When the tribes merged into the Nagual tribe (wearing yellow buffs), their original tribal alliances remained, and the former members of Embera quickly voted out Yaga and Nana, leaving Meti as the only former Kuna member left in the game. Following the elimination of Nana, Tebby approached Meti and Nike about forming an all-girl alliance. This new alliance, along with Jeremiah, voted out Leonard and the leader of the former Embera alliance, Derrick. When it came time for the final four, the contestants competed in two challenges in order to determine the final two. The first of these challenges was the "plank" challenge. As Meti was the first person to fall off the plank, she was eliminated from the game. As Tebby was the last person to fall off the plank, she automatically advanced to the final two. The other two contestants competed in a second challenge which Jeremiah won, advancing him to the final two while Nike was eliminated. Ultimately, it was Tebby from Botswana who won this season over Jeremiah with a jury vote of 5-1.

Challenge winners and eliminations by episode
Episode		Challenge winner(s)		Eliminated	Finish
No.	Original air date	Reward	Immunity	Eliminated	Finish
1	September 3, 2006	Embera	None		
2	September 10, 2006	Embera	Embera	Chipo	1st Voted Out; Day 3
3	September 17, 2006	Kuna	Kuna	Ario	2nd Voted Out; Day 6
4	September 24, 2006	Embera	Embera	Lloyd	3rd Voted Out; Day 9
5	October 1, 2006	Kuna	Embera	Frieda	4th Voted Out; Day 12
6	October 8, 2006	Yaga	None		
7	October 15, 2006	Yaga, [Leonard]	Jeremiah	Yaga	5th Voted Out; 1st Jury Member; Day 14
8	October 22, 2006	Tebby, [Nike]	Tebby	Nana	6th Voted Out; 2nd Jury Member; Day 16
9	October 29, 2006	Derrick, [Leonard]	Derrick	Leonard	7th Voted Out; 3rd Jury Member; Day 18
10	November 5, 2006	Tebby, [Meti]	Jeremiah	Derrick	8th Voted Out; 4th Jury Member; Day 20
11	November 12, 2006	None	Tebby	Meti	Lost Challenge; 5th Jury Member; Day 21
11	November 12, 2006	None	Jeremiah	Nike	Lost Challenge; 6th Jury Member; Day 21
12	November 19, 2006	Jury Vote		Jeremiah	Runner-Up
12	November 19, 2006	Jury Vote		Tebby	Sole Survivor

== Voting history ==
	Original Tribes				Merged Tribe					
Episode	2	3	4	5	7	8	9	10	11	
Day	3	6	9	12	14	16	18	20	21	
Eliminated	Chipo	Ario	Lloyd	Frieda	Yaga	Nana	Leonard	Derrick	Meti	Nike
Vote	4–2	4–2	3–1–1	3–1	4–3–1	5–1–1	4–2	4–1	Challenge	Challenge
Voter	Votes									
Tebby		Ario			Yaga	Nana	Leonard	Derrick	Won	Immune
Jeremiah		Ario			Yaga	Nana	Leonard	Derrick	Safe	Won
Nike		Derrick			Nana	Nana	Leonard	Derrick	Safe	Lost
Meti	Chipo		Frieda	Frieda	Derrick	Derrick	Leonard	Derrick	Lost	
Derrick		Ario			Yaga	Nana	Meti	Nike		
Leonard		Ario			Yaga	Nana	Meti			
Nana	Chipo		Lloyd	Frieda	Derrick	Jeremiah				
Yaga	Chipo		Lloyd	Frieda	Derrick					
Frieda	Meti		Lloyd	Meti						
Lloyd	Chipo		Nana							
Ario		Derrick								
Chipo	Meti									

Jury vote
Episode	12	
Day	21	
Finalist	Jeremiah	Tebby
Votes	5–1	
Juror	Votes	
Nike		Tebby
Meti		Tebby
Derrick		Tebby
Leonard		Tebby
Nana		Tebby
Yaga	Jeremiah	
