= Rune Wenneberg =

Command Sergeant Major of the Norwegian Armed Forces

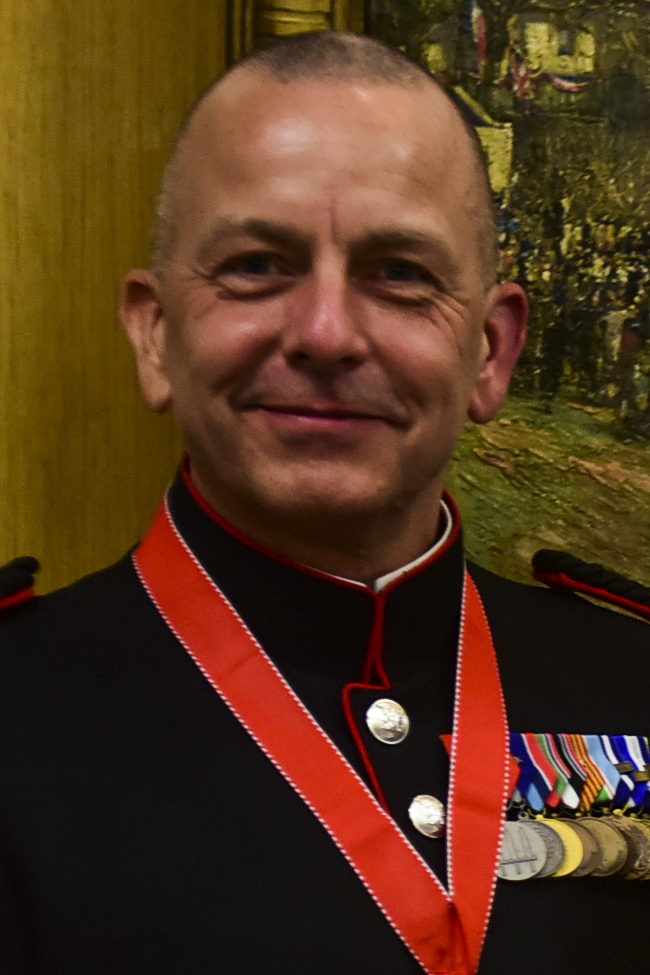
- Wenneberg as Command Sergeant Major of the Norwegian Armed Forces
- Born: 1969 (age 56–57)
- Military career
- Allegiance: Norway
- Branch: Norwegian Armed Forces
- Service years: 1988–present
- Rank: Sergeant Major
- Commands: Command Sergeant Major of the Norwegian Armed Forces

Rune Wenneberg (born 1969) is a Norwegian senior non-commissioned officer serving in the Norwegian Armed Forces. Holding the rank of Sergeant major, he has served as the Command Sergeant Major of the Norwegian Armed Forces since 1 November 2021.

== Education ==
Wenneberg attended the Norwegian non-commissioned officer school and the Norwegian Military Academy. He has also studied at the Royal Danish Defence College and at the Joint Forces Staff College in Virginia, United States.

== Military career ==
Wenneberg has served as a company commander in Mechanized Company 4 (Mek 4) of the Telemark Battalion. He has participated in international operations in Lebanon, Bosnia and Herzegovina, Kosovo, Iraq and Afghanistan.

In 2015, he became the first Sergeant Major of the Norwegian Army, the highest rank in the specialist career track introduced under Norway's military personnel reform. Holding NATO rank code OR-9, he was the first person in Norway since 1930 to be appointed to a rank equivalent to that of a traditional warrant officer or senior non-commissioned officer.

=== Public attention ===
In 2010, Wenneberg became a prominent figure in a national debate concerning military culture and symbol use among Norwegian forces serving in Afghanistan. As commander of Mek 4, he was associated with the unit's use of Viking-inspired symbolism and the battle cry "Til Valhall" ("To Valhalla"), both of which became subjects of public discussion.

== Awards and decorations ==
Wenneberg has received the following awards and decorations:

=== Norwegian medals and awards ===
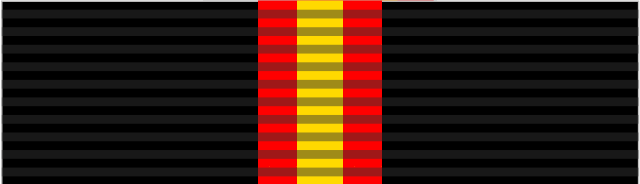
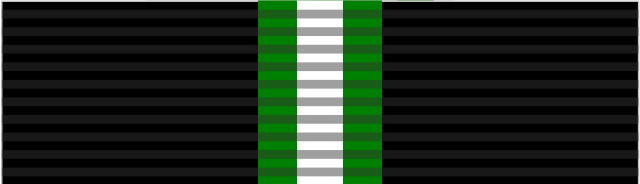
Defence Service Medal with Laurel Branch
Norwegian Army Medal of Merit
Defence Service Medal with one star
Defence Medal for International Operations with two stars
Medal for Defence Service Abroad with Rosette
Medal for Defence Operations Abroad Afghanistan IV (four deployments)
Medal for Defence Operations Abroad Iraq II (two deployments)
Military Service Medal Army with three stars
Police Afghanistan Medal
Norwegian defence shooting badge with laurel wreath
Norwegian defence military sports badge with two stars

=== Foreign decorations ===
United Nations Medal UN Interim Force in Lebanon (UNIFIL)
NATO Medal – Former Yugoslavia
NATO Medal – Kosovo
NATO Medal – ISAF
Cross for the Four Day Marches

=== Other honours ===
Inducted into the U.S. Army Sergeant Morales Club (2018)
