= Democratic Republic of the Congo–Norway relations =

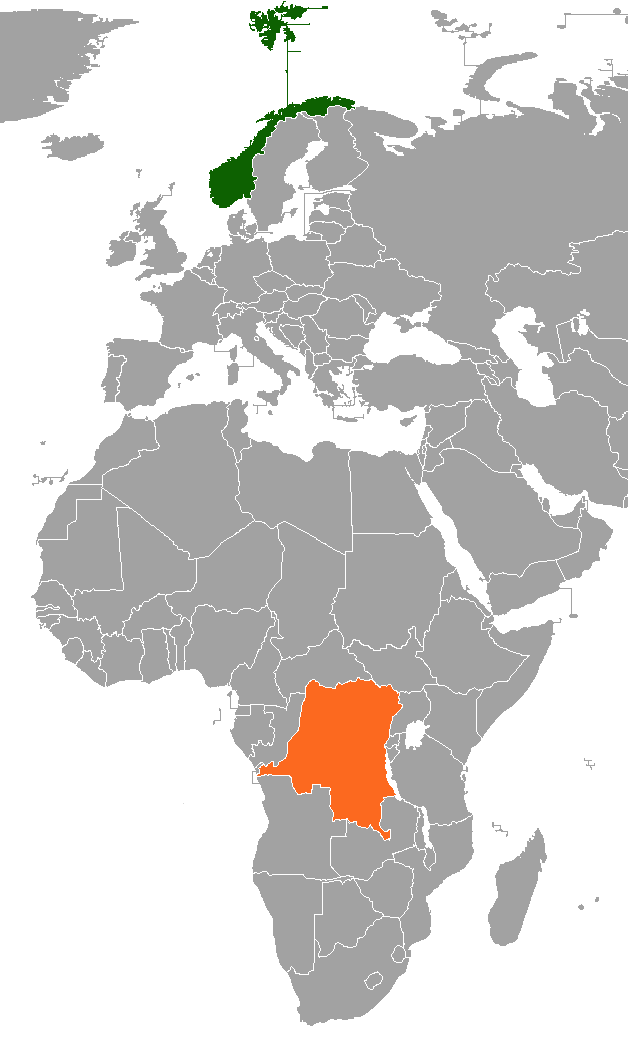
- Norway: DR Congo

Democratic Republic of the Congo–Norway relations refer to the bilateral relations between Democratic Republic of the Congo and Norway. The Democratic Republic of the Congo is represented by a non-resident embassy in London. Norway opened an embassy in Kinshasa in 2021, which also covers several other Central African countries. There are 1,930 DR Congolese people living in Norway. The Norwegian Ministry of Foreign Affairs discourages people to travel to the northern and eastern parts of the Congo.

== History ==
The Congo became independent from Belgium on June 30, 1960. Norway had begun humanitarian aid to the Congo since at least 1963.

In 1963, Norway was one of only six nations that Congo approached with a request for military aid, asking for help to build a navy. Norway declined the request, citing a shortage of the training expertise Congo was looking for.

Norway gave the Congo NOK 40 million (US $15.7 million) in 2003. Vidar Helgesen, the Norwegian Secretary of State said: "In spite of some hopeful signs in the peace process and the establishment of a transitional government in the capital, Kinshasa, the humanitarian situation in the eastern part of the country is precarious." In 2004, all previous debt was forgiven. In 2007, the Secretaries General of the five largest Norwegian humanitarian organizations visited the Congo to access the crisis. In 2008, an additional NOK 15 million were supplied.

In 2009, Minister of Defence Anne-Grete Strøm-Erichsen visited the Congo to observe the conflict. She agreed to send troops to supply manpower to the United Nations peace-keeping forces during the Kivu conflict.

DR Congo's debt to Norway, 143 million Norwegian kroner, has been erased as a result of a decision by Norway's Cabinet on October 21, 2011.

== Joshua French and Tjostolv Moland ==
In 2009, Norwegian nationals Joshua French and Tjostolv Moland were arrested and charged in the killing of their hired driver, attempted murder of a witness, espionage, armed robbery and the possession of illegal firearms. They were found guilty and sentenced to death, and also fined—along with Norway—$60 million.

Jonas Gahr Støre, Norway's Foreign Minister said: "I strongly react to the death sentence of the two Norwegians ... Norway is a principled opponent of the death penalty and I will contact the DRC's foreign minister to convey this." According to Bloomberg.com "Norway also object[ed] to the espionage conviction and the inclusion of the country in the fine, Stoere [sic] said. 'Norway isn't a part of this case.'"

A letter dated March 2012 was "delivered in Kinshasa from prime minister Stoltenberg to president Kabila". It has not been answered as of August 2013.

== Resident diplomatic missions ==
- DR Congo is accredited to Norway from its embassy in London, the United Kingdom.
- Norway has an embassy in Kinshasa.

== See also ==
- Foreign relations of the Democratic Republic of the Congo
- Foreign relations of Norway
- People of African descent in Norway
