= Skjold, Troms =

Village in Målselv Municipality, Norway

Skjold Øverbygd
- Village
- Interactive map of Skjold
- Location within Troms Location within Norway
- Coordinates: 69.0244°N 19.2961°E
- Country: Norway
- Region: Northern Norway
- County: Troms
- District: Midt-Troms
- Municipality: Målselv Municipality

Area
  - Total: 0.91 km^{2} (0.35 sq mi)
- Elevation: 89 m (292 ft)

Population (2023)
  - Total: 243
  - Density: 267/km^{2} (690/sq mi)
- Time zone: UTC+01:00 (CET)
  - Summer (DST): UTC+02:00 (CEST)
- Post Code: 9334 Øverbygd

Skjold or Øverbygd is a village in Målselv Municipality in Troms county, Norway. Skjold is located at the confluence of the Målselva and Fjellfrøselva rivers, about 30 km (19 mi) east of the town of Bardufoss. The village of Holmen lies just east of Skjold. The 0.91-square-kilometre (220-acre) village has a population (2023) of 243 and a population density of 267 inhabitants per square kilometre (690/sq mi).

The Skjold army base is located just north of the village of Skjold. It is home to the Brigade Nord (lit. 'Northern brigade') of the Norwegian Army.

The village of Skjold was the administrative centre of the old Øverbygd Municipality which existed from 1925 until its dissolution in 1964. The village area is also known as Øverbygd since it was the centre of the old municipality.

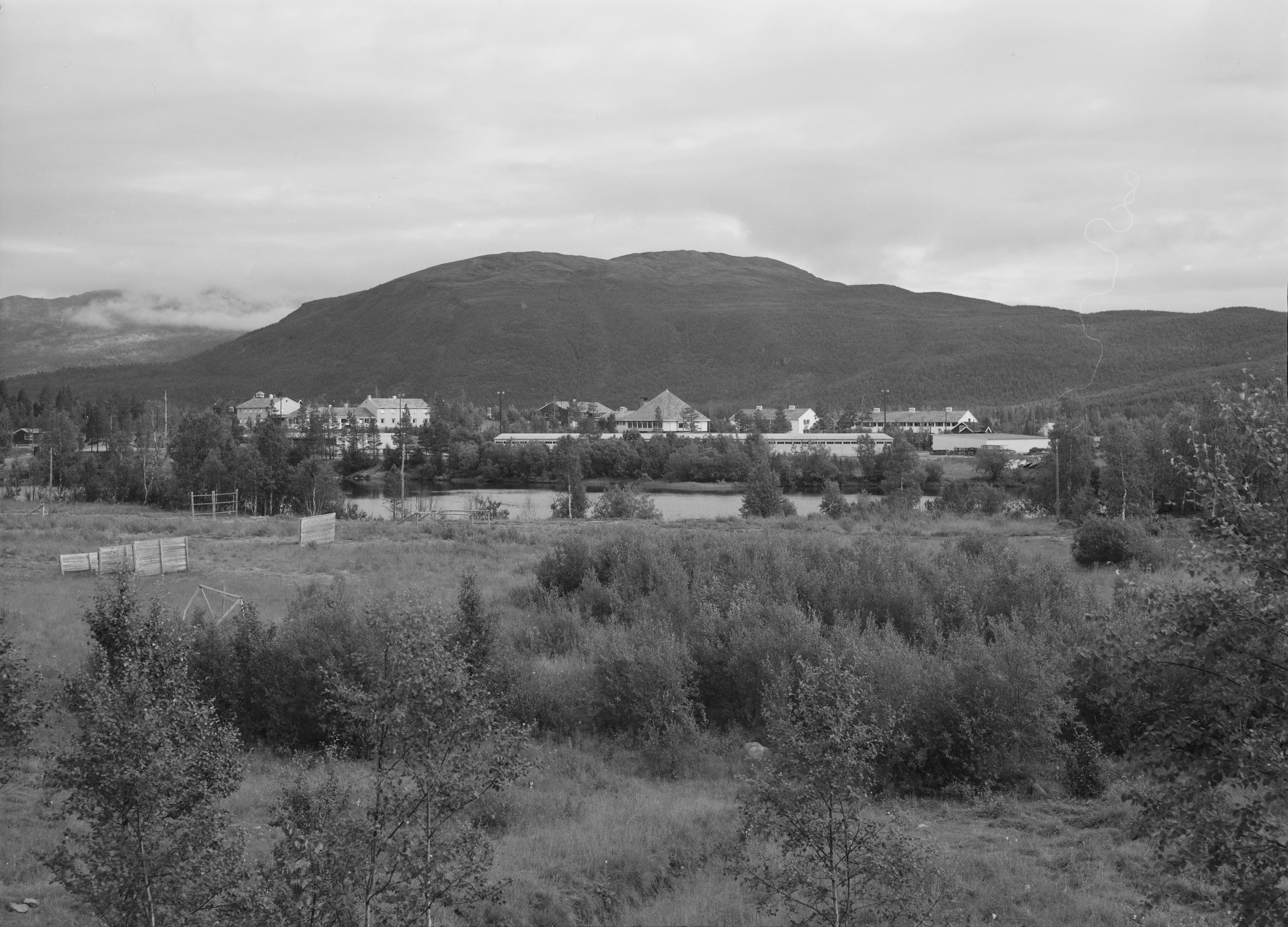
View of Øverbygd (c. 1958)

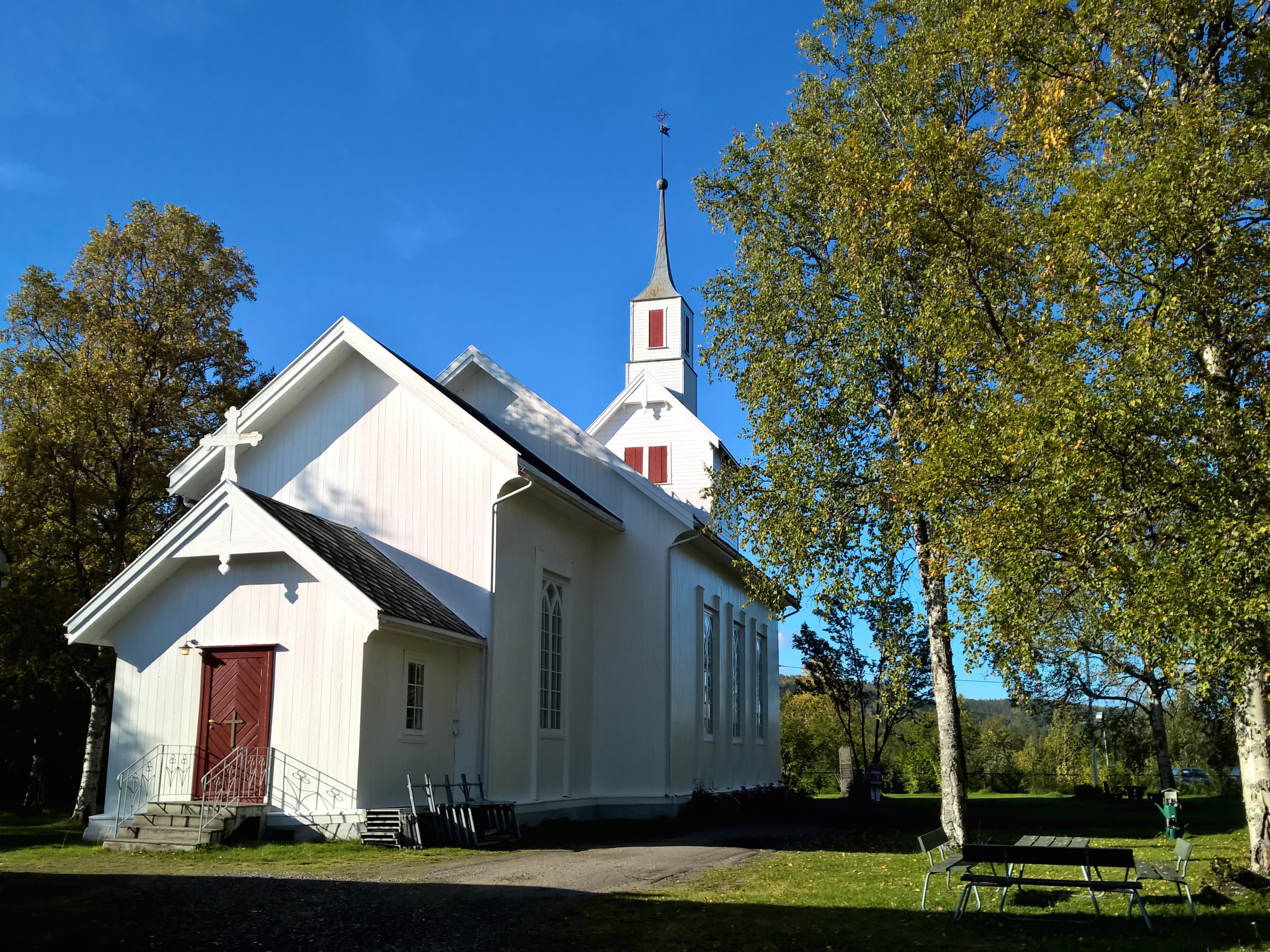
Øverbygd Church
