= Anthony Oseyemi =

British–South African actor with Nigerian descent

- Born: Anthony Oluwakayode Oseyemi; January 17, 1977 (age 49); United Kingdom
- Education: University of North London
- Occupations: Actor, singer, writer, musician, producer
- Years active: 2002–present
- Height: 1.74 m (5 ft 9 in)

Anthony Oluwakayode Oseyemi (born 17 January 1977) is a British–South African actor of Nigerian descent. He is best known for the roles in the films and teleserials Five Fingers for Marseilles, The Congo Murders and Isidingo. Apart from acting, he is also a writer, musician and producer.

== Personal life ==
He was born on 17 January 1977 in the UK to a Nigerian family. Later he relocated to South Africa, where he received his BA degree in Performing Arts from the University of North London. He completed postgraduate studies in the UK. After the studies, he returned to South Africa and settled there.

== Career ==
He started his acting career on stage as part of Lewisham Youth Theatre. He performed at the London International Festival of Theatre, the Tricycle Theatre and the Albany with Project Phakama. He played the lead role in the play The Amen Corner by James Baldwin. He also co-produced and appeared in the play Performance with Multi media production.

From 2002 to 2003, he had a recurring role in the television series Is Harry On The Boat? He also had guest roles in series including The Bill (2003) and Holby City (2005), and Coming Up (2005). After obtaining a Performing Arts degree, he had lead roles in other TV series including Jacob's Cross, Room 9, Traffick and Isidingo. He also appeared in Wild at Heart, The Runaway, Strike Back, The Book of Negroes and Mzansi Love: Ekasi Style.

In 2017, he played Congo in the South African Western thriller film Five Fingers for Marseilles, directed by Michael Matthews. He also starred in the romantic comedy Hector's Search for Happiness and in the American direct-to-video action film SEAL Team 8: Behind Enemy Lines.

Other than acting, he also wrote the South African television series Tempy Pushas, broadcast on SABC 1. He then wrote the serial Room 9, which earned him a nomination at the 2014 South African Film and Television Awards Nomination.

== Filmography ==
Year	Film	Role	Genre	Ref.
2002	Palindrome r.s.s.r.	Matthew	Short film	
2003	The Bill	Jimmy Gardener	TV series	
2003	Is Harry on the Boat?	Jamie Williams	TV series	
2004	Holly - Bolly	Obi	Short film	
2005	Holby City	Scott Hill	TV series	
2005	Last Rights	Jameel	TV mini-series	
2005	Coming Up	Jeffery	TV series	
2006	Survivor Africa: Panama	Self (host)	TV series	
2007	Mein Traum von Afrika	Sammeltaxifahrer	TV movie	
2007	Flood	Coughian	Car Park Man	
2007	Mein Herz in Afrika	Goodman	TV movie	
2008	Shooting Stars	Duke	TV series	
2008	The Experimental Witch	Spencer	Film	
2009	The Philanthropist	Hotel manager	TV series	
2009	Natalee Holloway	Island Officer	TV movie	
2009	Long Street	Steve	Film	
2009	Attack on Darfur	AU Soldier	Film	
2009	Albert Schweitzer	Joseph	Film	
2010	Silent Witness	Immigration Official	TV series	
2010	Sweetheart	Honest John	Short film	
2011	Wild at Heart	Lungile	TV series	
2011	The Runaway	Alfie	Film	
2012	Strike Back	Waabri	TV series	
2012	Copposites	Jonathan Dube	Film	
2012	Room 9	Solomon Onyegu	TV series	
2014	T-Junction	T	Short film	
2014	SEAL Team 8: Behind Enemy Lines	Jay	Film	
2014	The Salvation	Jefferson	Film	
2014	Dominion	Deck Officer	TV series	
2014	Hector and the Search for Happiness	Marcel	Film	
2015	The Book of Negroes	Dante	TV mini-series	
2015	Assignment	Kumi Moloi	Film	
2015	Bleeding Gospel	Kisuh	Short film	
2016	Our Girl	Captain Osman	TV series	
2017	Five Fingers for Marseilles	Congo	Film	
2018	Le BadMilk	Orlando	TV series	
2018	Troy: Fall of a City	Spartan Dignitary	TV series	
2018	The Congo Murders	General Joseph Kazumba	Film	
2019	Shadow	Hugo Shaw	TV series	
2019	The Red Sea Diving Resort	Road Block Soldier #1	Film	
2019	Agent	Christopher Kilembe	TV series	
2021	Gaia	Winston	Film	
2021	Dead Places	Will Stone	TV series	
2022	Resident Evil	Roth	TV series	
2023	Love, Sex and 30 Candles	Prof. Kwame	Film	
2024	Blood Legacy	Akin Adesina	TV series	
TBD	Like Moths to a Flame	Mister Bishop	Film	

== See also ==
- Survivor (franchise)
