= Brigade Nord =

- Insignia of Brigade Nord
- Active: 2002–present
- Country: Norway
- Branch: Norwegian Army
- Type: Brigade
- Role: Mechanised Infantry
- Size: 4,500
- Garrison/HQ: Bardufoss
- Colours: Blue beret
- Mascot: Reindeer

Commanders
- Current commander: Brigadier Terje Bruøygard

Insignia
- Standard

Brigade Nord (Brig. N.; Northern Brigade) is a major combat formation and brigade of the Norwegian Army, consisting of eight battalions and one military police company. It is mostly based in Troms (Bardu Municipality and Målselv Municipality) north of the Arctic Circle.

The brigade consists of both conscripted and enlisted personnel. When fully operational, the brigade is able to conduct operations across the entire conflict spectrum, from peace to war, including high-intensity, mechanised land operations with support from other defence branches and allied forces.

== Organisation ==
Responsible for the nine battalions, Brigade Nord ensures that they are equipped and trained to operate together. Brigade Nord is a complete, tactical joint system that has the overall command, ensuring cooperation and effectiveness across the battalions. Brigade Nord is largely organised according to the same principles today as when it was established in 1953, as the Brigade in Northern Norway, with subdivisions representing a dedicated subject field. Brigade Nord currently consists of nine battalions, brigade staffs and a military police company, which in total account for about 5,000-6000 soldiers.

The Norwegian Brigade Nord have taken Tynset Municipality in a simulated operation during NATO exercise Trident Juncture 2018.

- Brigade Nord, in Bardufoss
  - Brigade Command, in Bardufoss
  - Armoured Battalion (Panserbataljonen), in Setermoen with Leopard 2A4NO main battle tanks and CV90 infantry fighting vehicles
  - Narvik Battalion (Narvik bataljon), in Skjold mechanized infantry with CV9030N and M113 armored personnel carrier
  - Telemark Battalion (Telemark bataljon), in Rena with Leopard 2A4NO main battle tanks and CV9030N infantry fighting vehicles
  - Artillery Battalion (Artilleribataljonen), in Setermoen with K9 Thunder self-propelled howitzers and SHORAD
    - Combat Air Defence Battery (Kampluftvernbatteri), with the air surveillance and fire control components of a NASAMS 3 battery and surface-launched AMRAAM missiles mounted on Humvee. Surface-launched IRIS-T missiles to be added.
  - Combat Engineer Battalion (Ingeniørbataljonen), in Skjold
  - Signal Battalion (Sambandsbataljonen), in Bardufoss
  - Medical Battalion (Sanitetsbataljonen), in Setermoen
  - Combat Service Support Battalion (Stridstrenbataljonen), in Bardufoss
  - Military Police Company (Militærpolitikompaniet), in Bardufoss

The brigade is in the process of reorganisation. A previous transformation of the 2. bataljon to light infantry has been reverted and a fourth mechanised battalion is being formed. The reason for a fourth maneuver battalion stated by the Armed Forces is a NATO requirement four combat battalions in the combat brigades of the organisation, but in the words of Lt.-Col. Espen Strande, the army's chief public communications officer, the army has the sufficient armament and equipment for only two. A tender for new main battle tanks for the army is in progress with the 2A7 version of the German Leopard 2 currently operated and the South Korean K2 Black Panther as the two contenders for the order. However the current quantity of tanks in the Norwegian Army is insufficient for four tank squadrons and the Chief of the Army Major-General Lars Lervik has stated a requirement for at least 72 new tanks with a preference for 84 units.

== History ==
Unit insignia of the disbanded Brigaden i Nord-Norge (BRIG N), the precursor to the current brigade.

Despite the fact that the brigade was first established in 2002, it is a continuation of older decommissioned combat formation. The brigade traces its history back to the end of the Second World War, when the British government requested Norwegian military support in the British zone of Allied-occupied Germany. In 1946, the Independent Norwegian Brigade (in Norwegian: Tysklandsbrigaden, lit. 'The German Brigade') was founded. This expeditionary brigade consisted of a contingent of 4200 young conscripts, which served six months in Germany, before the next contingent carried on with the service. The brigade, under the command of the Norwegian Army Command Germany (Tysklandskommandoen), was stationed in Schleswig-Holstein. In total, twelve contingents served in Germany between January 1947 and April 1953.

=== Establishment of a northern brigade ===
The Military Committee and the Norwegian Parliament made many changes to the structure and organisation of the army in the 1950s. The allied military advisors had recommended that Norway should organise the army into three divisions: 1st Division Command in the east, 3rd Division Command in the south and 6th Division Command in the north. Based on a report from the Norwegian Post-War Army Command, The Norwegian Parliament prepared a draft for a new defence organisation, with Parliamentary Proposition no. 2 (1953) “The Organisation of the Armed Forces”, which has enormous significance for the Army in the post-war period.

Two of the proposed three division commands were approved. Already in the autumn of 1952, 1st Division Command was operational. The 6th Division Command was organised by the Norwegian Army Command Germany, and the Independent Norwegian Brigade was converted into a combat formation called Brigaden i Nord-Norge.

There were many logistical challenges in the process of moving the German Brigade to Northern Norway. One challenge was deciding in which garrison to place the different brigade detachments. Another urgent challenge was that not all the establishments were ready to accommodate the battalions. In 1951, the Norwegian Parliament adopted a three-year building program, in order to be able to house the brigade soldiers and officers. This national building program had a price tag of 735 million kroner, of which 60 million went to the newly established brigade in Northern Norway.

=== Operational brigade in the Cold War ===
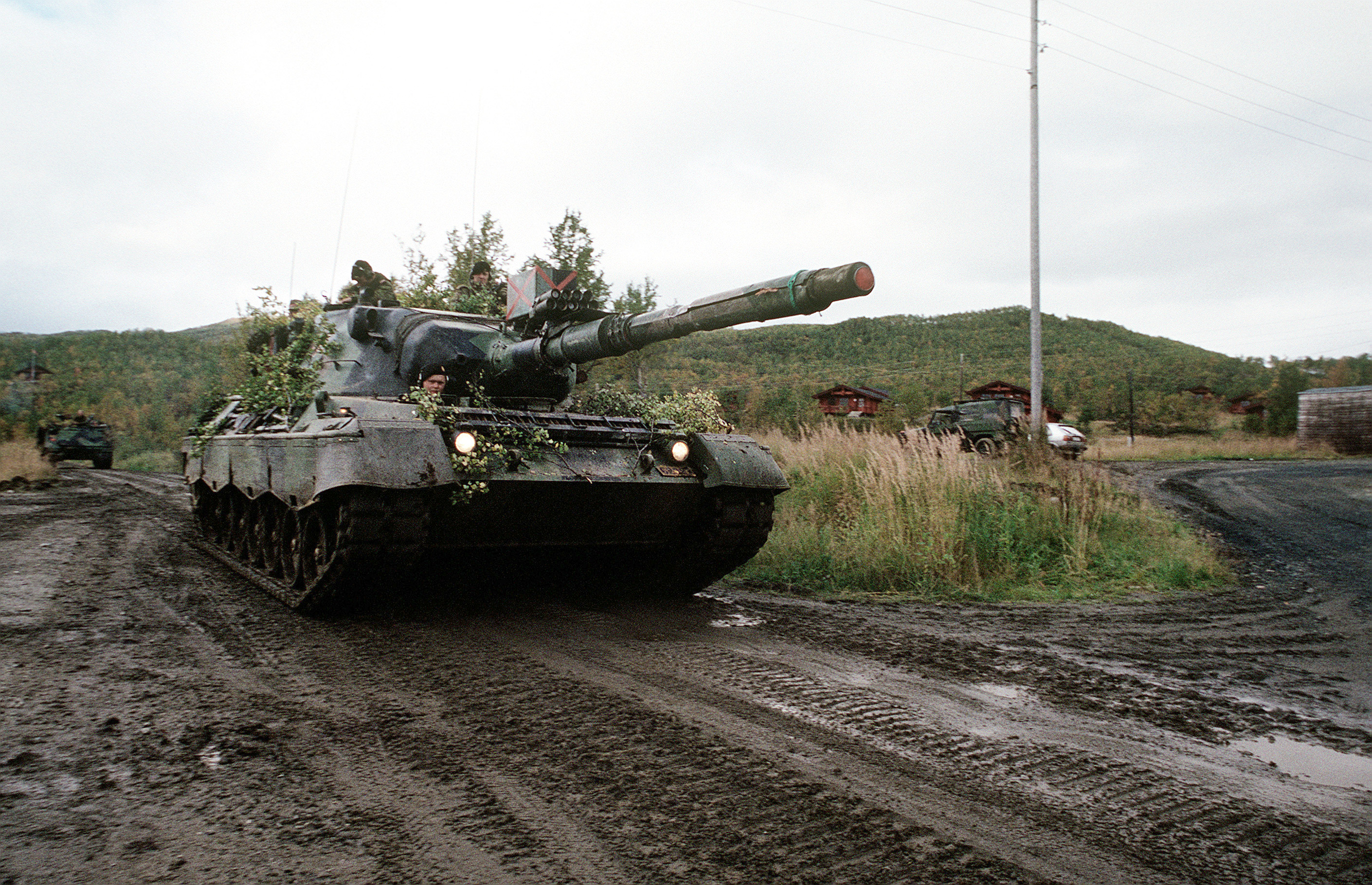
Leopard 1 from the Armoured Battalion on an exercise in summer of 1988.

The brigade was formally declared operational on September 1, 1953. As a result of the parliaments's introduction of a new army system in 1953, the standing brigades were to be made up of conscripted soldiers in their initial service. Unlike the German Brigade, the young men now served one year in their respective detachments.

The brigade in Northern Norway had two main functions: As a standing unit, it was an essential part of the land military invasion defense in Northern Norway; as a complete brigade, with all types of weapons and troops, it was an important training institution for the field army.

During the Cold War, the brigade was central to the defense against a possible invasion from the Soviet Union. The brigade was stationed in the eastern valleys of Troms, which was defined as the defensive center of gravity for the territorial defense. Here, the brigade was to ensure that the opponent would be stopped and hold out until allied reinforcements could arrive. For a long time, defense planning was based on the assumption that the region of Finnmark could not be held, and that Norway had to be prepared for invasion from the east, both into Finnmark and through Finland. Parts of the brigade were therefore on high alert for long periods of time, down to 30 minutes, in order to meet an attack. A parliamentary decision from July 1953 stipulated that the two standing brigades in the new army structure should act as standing contingency forces in exposed areas, until mobilisation was initiated.

Throughout its existence, the brigade was central to the training and education of Norwegian army soldiers and units, from all types of troops. The soldiers were trained in basic military skills while practicing under the special and demanding conditions in Northern Norway.

=== Decommissioning and rebirth ===
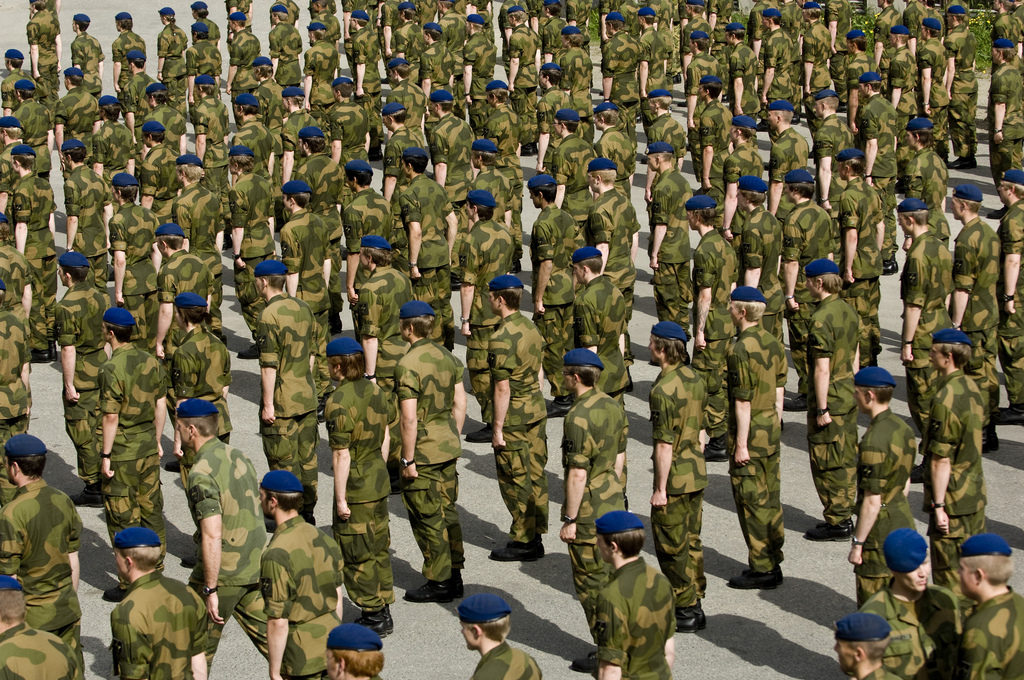
Soldiers from the Signal Battalion wearing blue berets.

In 1995, the 42-year-old brigade was disbanded in favor of a new defense arrangement. The motivation behind this change was the 1992 Defense Study, which concluded that a strong invasion defense in Troms was still necessary, but the operation needed to be more cost-effective than before. From August 1996, the Brigade in Northern Norway ceased to be an operational brigade, and the garrisons of the brigade became independent garrisons directly under the command of the 6th Division Command. In 2002, the brigade was reestablished as Brigade Nord (lit. 'Brigade North').

== Bibliography ==
=== Books ===
- Lundesgaard, Leif (1995). Brigaden i Nord-Norge. 1953–1995. Oslo: Elanders Forlag. ISBN 82-90545-51-7.
- Breidlid, Olav; Oppegaard, Tore H.; Torblå, Per (1990). Hæren etter andre verdenskrig. 1945–1990. Oslo: Fabritius Forlag. ISBN 82-90545-16-9.
- Valen, May Brith (2012). Samvirke – et av Hærens viktigste kjerneområder (PDF) (Master thesis). Forsvarets høgskole. Archived from the original on 2015-02-13.
