= Øverbygd Church =

- Øverbygd kirke
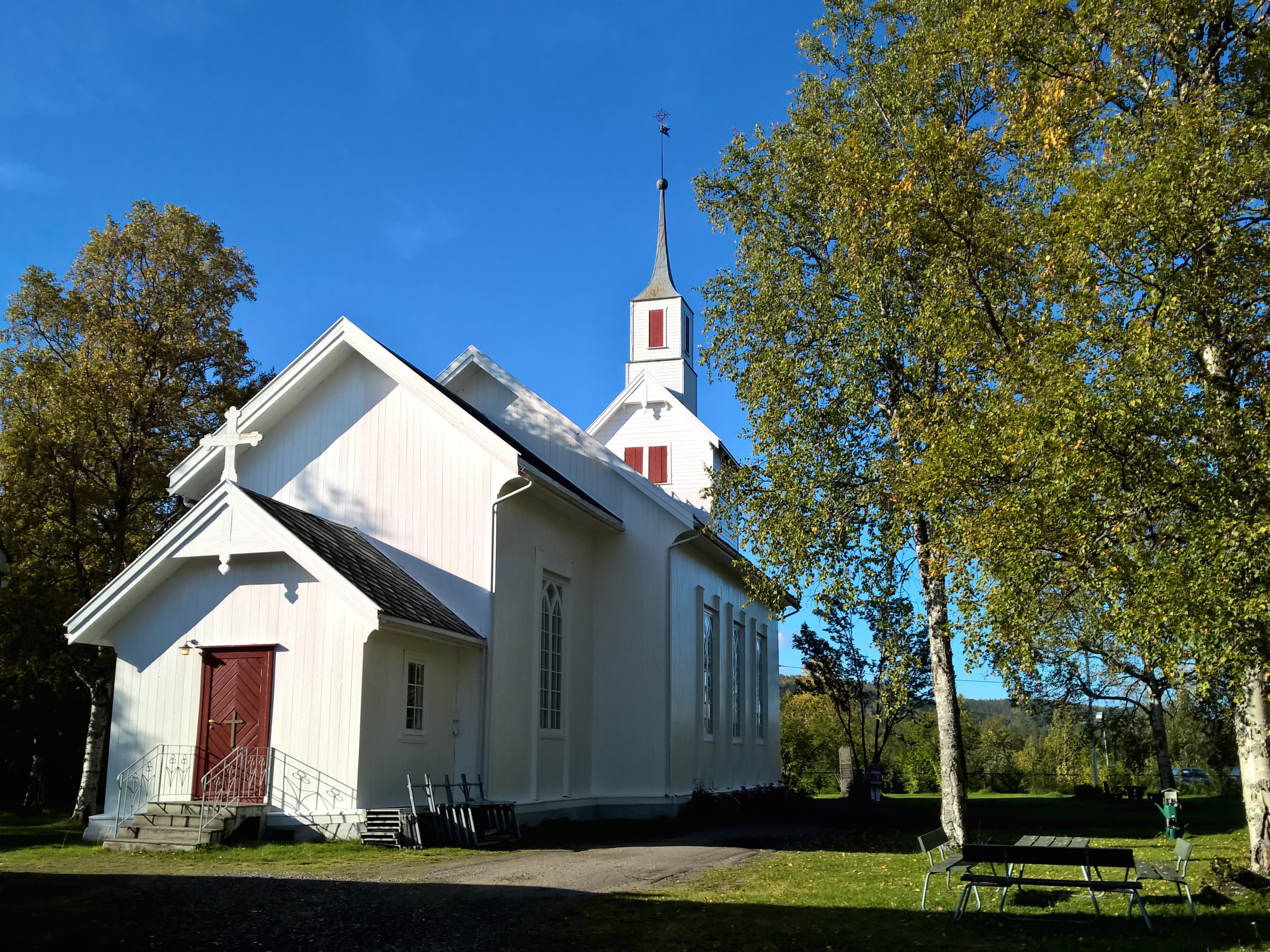
- View of the church
- Øverbygd Church
- 68.997459°N 19.132862°E
- Location: Målselv Municipality, Troms
- Country: Norway
- Denomination: Church of Norway
- Churchmanship: Evangelical Lutheran

History
- Status: Parish church
- Founded: 1867
- Consecrated: 1867

Architecture
- Functional status: Active
- Architect: Jacob Wilhelm Nordan
- Architectural type: Long church
- Completed: 1867 (159 years ago)

Specifications
- Capacity: 280
- Materials: Wood

Administration
- Diocese: Nord-Hålogaland
- Deanery: Senja prosti
- Parish: Øverbygd
- Norwegian Cultural Heritage Site
- Type: Church
- Status: Not protected
- ID: 85922

Øverbygd Church (Norwegian: Øverbygd kirke) is a parish church of the Church of Norway in Målselv Municipality in Troms county, Norway. It is located in the Øverbygd area of Målselv Municipality, about 8 kilometres (5.0 mi) southwest of the village of Skjold. It is the main church for the Øverbygd parish which is part of the Senja prosti (deanery) in the Diocese of Nord-Hålogaland. The white, wooden church was built in a long church style in 1867 by the architect Jacob Wilhelm Nordan. The church seats about 280 people. The church was consecrated by Bishop Carl Peter Parelius Essendrop.

== See also ==
- List of churches in Nord-Hålogaland
