= Holmen, Målselv =

Village in Målselv Municipality, Norway

Holmen
- Village
- View of the village in winter
- Interactive map of Holmen
- Location within Troms Location within Norway
- Coordinates: 69.22475°N 18.46068°E
- Country: Norway
- Region: Northern Norway
- County: Troms
- District: Midt-Troms
- Municipality: Målselv Municipality
- Time zone: UTC+01:00 (CET)
  - Summer (DST): UTC+02:00 (CEST)
- Post Code: 9334 Øverbygd

Holmen is a small village in Målselv Municipality in Troms county, Norway. It is located on the east side of the village of Skjold along the Målselva river.

== Possible UFO Sighting ==
On 3 November 1996, Holmen was the site of a well documented UFO sighting. It was reported that an extremely bright object moved over the hamlet at considerable speed in a zig-zag pattern, making a strange buzzing noise. This attracted UFO enthusiasts and local radio station Radio Bardufoss, with the reports from the latter suggesting that ingestion of moonshine may have been the cause of the sighting. This caused anger in the township, and a subsequent boycott of the channel in protest.
