= Lambert Mende Omalanga =

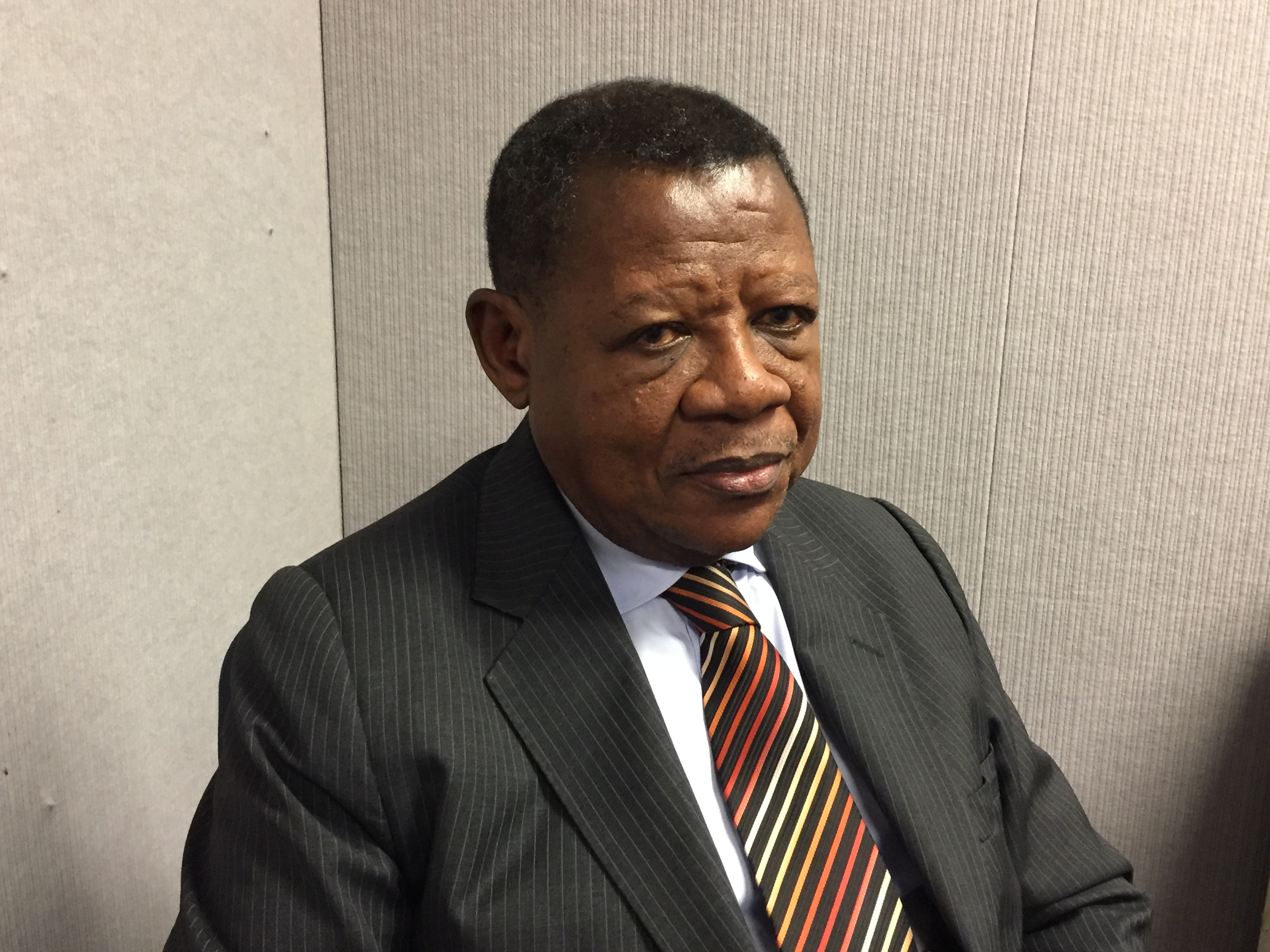
Mende in 2018

Lambert Mende Omalanga (born 11 February 1953) is the former minister of communications of the Democratic Republic of the Congo. He is best known for saying that an overturned fuel truck that exploded and killed 230 people was trying to overtake a bus, but is also famous for saying 80 died when a boat overturned. He was born near Lodja, Sankuru.
