= Armoured Battalion (Norway) =

Norwegian Army unit

- Panserbataljonen
- Insignia of the Armoured Battalion
- Active: 1987–present
- Country: Norway
- Branch: Army
- Type: Dragoons
- Role: Mechanised infantry
- Size: One battlegroup (Note: 460 soldiers)
- Part of: Brigade Nord
- Garrison/HQ: Setermoen
- Nickname(s): "Panser",
- Motto(s): Norwegian: Bitit Fyrst (Note: Simpler spelling of the Old Norwegian plural imperativ "bítið".); English: Strike First
- Colours: Yellow and green Soldiers wear black beret
- Mascot(s): Den sorte mink (The Black Mink)
- Anniversaries: Saint George's Day
- Engagements: Kosovo War (KFOR); War in Afghanistan (ISAF)

Commanders
- Current commander: Lieutenant colonel Lars Jansen

Insignia
- Standard

The Armoured Battalion (Norwegian: Panserbataljonen) is the first battalion and an infantry unit of the Norwegian Army. Although it is categorised as an armoured unit, the battalion (strictly a battlegroup) primarily serves in the mechanised infantry role. As with the Telemark Battalion, the unit also has a tank squadron equipped with the Leopard 2 main battle tank. The battalion is recognised as a cavalry unit for ceremonial purposes, so its conscripted soldiers are referred to as dragoons as opposed to privates, as is the case in most of the Norwegian Army.

The motto of the battalion is Bitit fyrst (Old Norse for "Strike First"), referring to the offensive role of the battalion.

== History ==
On 29 January 1987, the Armoured Battalion had its first formation in Målselv. It has participated in several international operations in the Balkans (KFOR) and in Afghanistan (ISAF).

== Organisation ==
- The Armoured Squadron – The second squadron, known as ESK2, Strv esk 2 or Stridsvogneskadronen is the battalion's main strike weapon. The squadron operates with the Leopard 2 main battle tank. The unit colour is red.
- Assault Squadron 3 – The third squadron, known as ESK3 or Stormeskadron 3. The squadron's role is to support ESK2 with mechanised infantry support. The squadron is based on quick and aggressive assaults with infantry squads supported by their CV90 infantry fighting vehicle. The unit colour is yellow. The Motto of the squadron is "Semper Paratus", which means always ready.
- Assault Squadron 4 – The fourth squadron, known as ESK4 or Stormeskadron 4. The squadron has the same role as that of ESK3. The unit colour is green, and their motto " Gulo ad arma, Plus Ultra" meaning "Wolverines to battle, continue forward" is in reference to their ability to push forward in combat.
- The Cavalry Squadron – The fifth squadron, known as ESK5, KavEsk or Kavalerieskadronen is a reconnaissance unit. Its roles also include artillery observation and sharpshooters. It also uses the CV90 infantry fighting vehicle. The unit colour is blue. The Armoured Reconnaissance platoon in ESK1 has the motto "Primus Intrat, Exit Novissimus" meaning "First in, last out".
- Combat Support Squadron 6 – The sixth squadron, known as ESK6 or Kampstøtte Eskadron 6. The largest and most complex of the battalion's units, its capabilities include logistics support, repair and recovery, signals, medevac and mortar support. The unit is also responsible for the protection and operation of the battalion's base of operations. The unit colour is black. The squadron motto is "Volens et Potens" which means willing and able.
- Minkebataljonen – During operations the battalion is usually supported by elements of the Combat Service support battalion, Engineer battalion, Intelligence battalion, Artillery battalion and Medical Battalion as well as Military police and other elements that may be attached depending on the mission. This combat group is known as Minkebataljonen.
