= Skjold (garrison) =

Skjold garrison
- Skjold leir
- Part of Brigade Nord
- Skjold, Troms, Norway

Site information
- Type: Military base
- Controlled by: Norwegian Army

Location
- Location of Skjold garrison
- Coordinates: 69.0278°N 19.2928°E

Garrison information
- Garrison: Norwegian Army 2nd Battalion

Skjold is an army camp in the small village Øverbygd in Målselv Municipality in Troms county, Norway. This camp is part of the Northern Brigade of the Norwegian Army and is where the 2nd Battalion Mechanized Infantry and Combat and Construction Engineers are based.
