= Telemark Battalion =

Telemark Bataljon
- Insignia of the Telemark Battalion
- Active: 1993–2002, 2003–present
- Country: Norway
- Branch: Army
- Type: Line Infantry
- Role: Mechanised Infantry
- Size: One battlegroup
- Part of: Brigade Nord
- Garrison/HQ: Rena
- Colours: Emerald green
- Engagements: Bosnian War; Kosovo War; Iraq War; War in Afghanistan (ISAF)

Commanders
- Current commander: Lieutenant Colonel Brage Reinaas

Insignia
- Standard

- Flag

The Telemark Battalion (Norwegian: Telemark bataljon, abbreviated as TMBN) is a mechanised infantry battalion of the Norwegian Army. It was established in 1993, and is a part of Brigade Nord and stationed at Rena, Hedmark. The battalion consists of five companies/squadrons.

== History ==
In 1993 it was a motorised infantry unit, tasked as an Immediate Reaction Force with the Norwegian Army, stationed at Heistadmoen in southern Norway, manned mainly by conscripts.

It served in Bosnia, and by 2002, all the enlisted soldiers had two and three-year contracts of enlistment and the unit had no more conscripts.

The battalion was moved to a new camp at Rena and converted to mechanised infantry. Presented with its new colours in 2002, the Telemark Battalion was operational on 1 July 2003.

The unit participated in Operation Karez in Afghanistan, in May 2008.

One soldier died in Afghanistan in 2004, and one died there in 2010.

== Organisation ==
- Tank Squadron 1: The battalion's tank unit, equipped with Leopard 2 main battle tanks.
- Cavalry Squadron 2: The battalion's armoured reconnaissance and scout unit, equipped with CV9030 infantry fighting vehicles, ATVs and different sensors like UAVs etc.
- Mechanised Infantry Company 3: Mechanised infantry equipped with CV9030 infantry fighting vehicles.
- Mechanised Infantry Company 4: Mechanised infantry equipped with CV9030 infantry fighting vehicles.
- Staff and Support Squadron 5: A combat support unit made up by mortar, medic, signals and repair platoons.

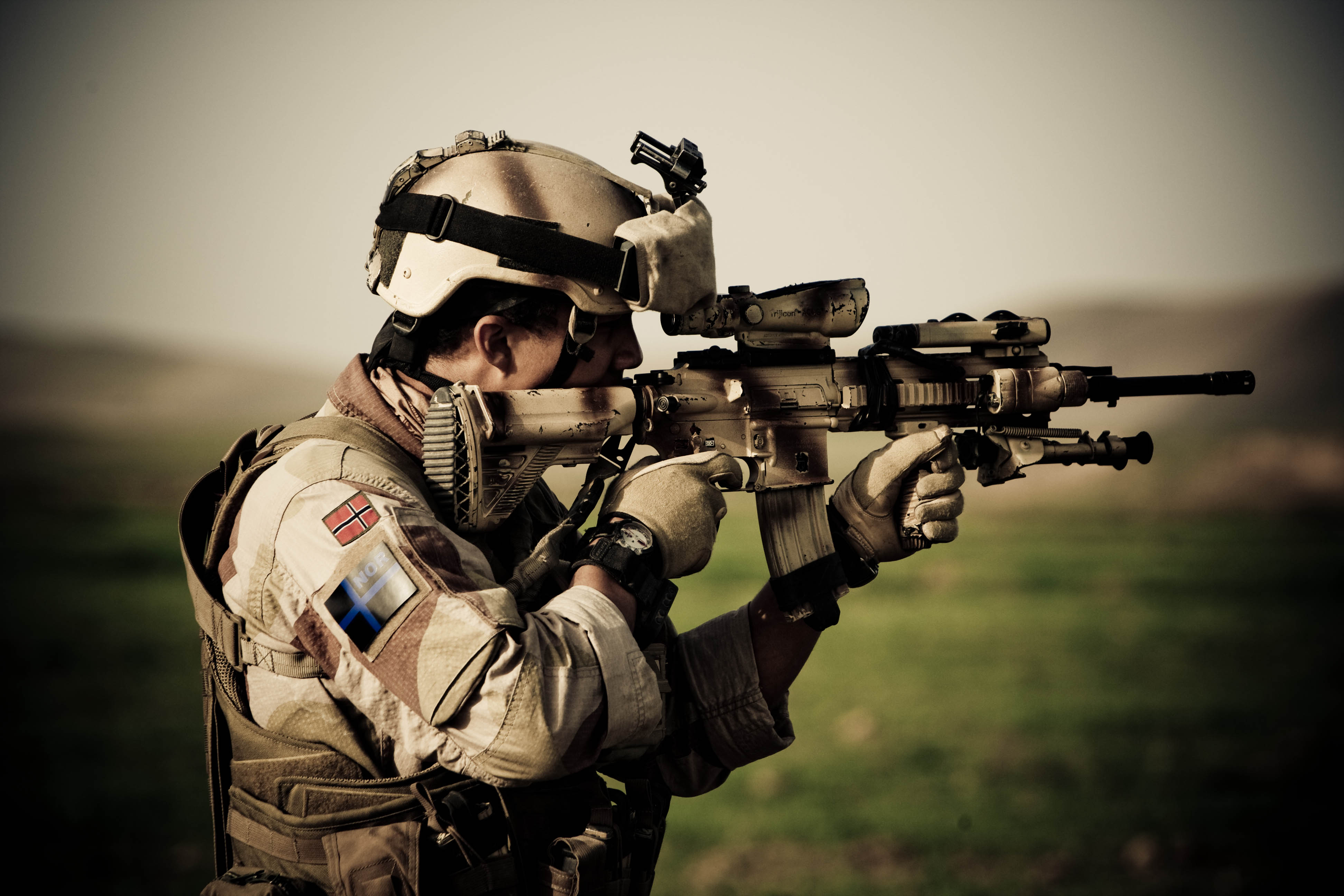
TMBN-soldier in Afghanistan

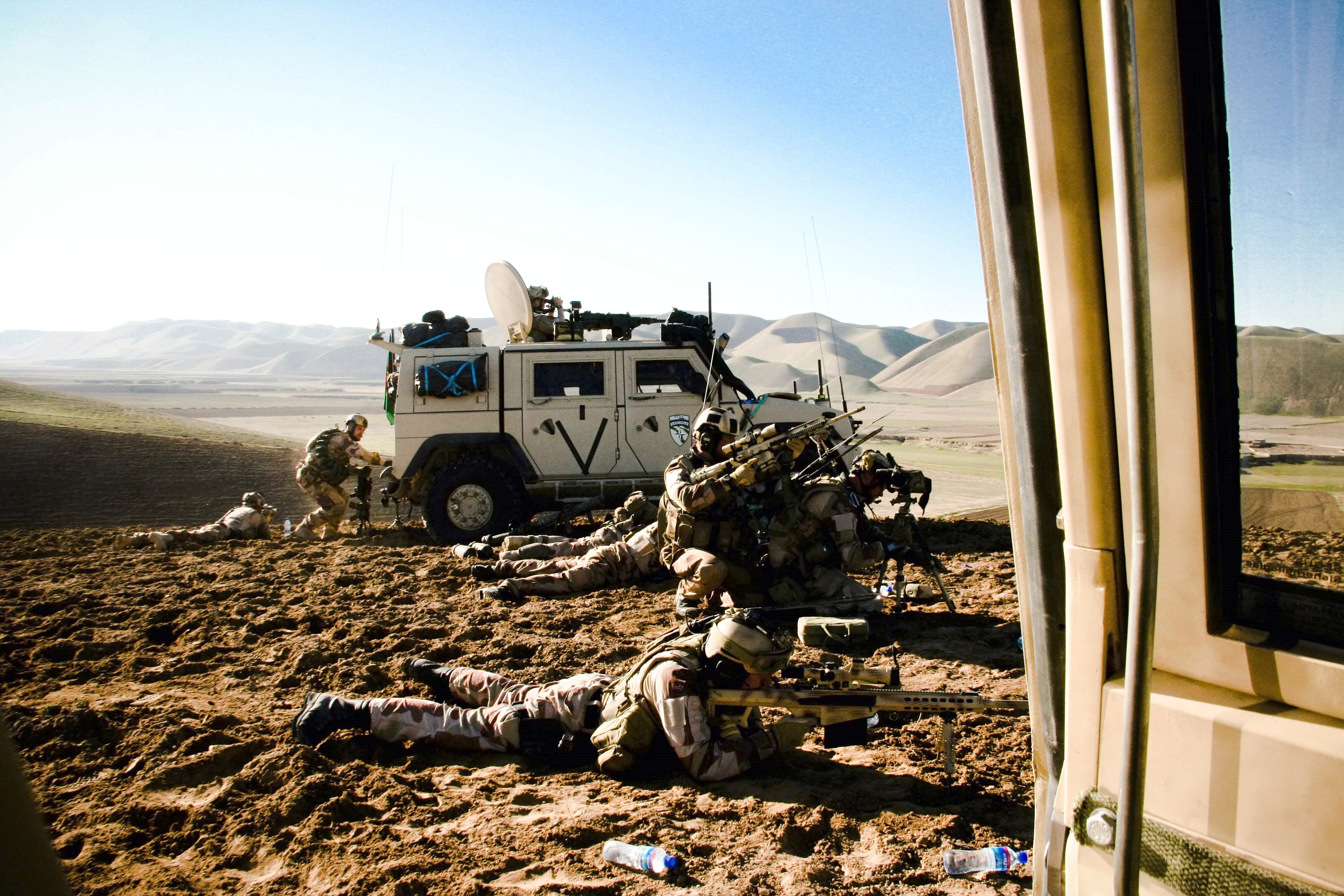
TMBN-soldiers in Afghanistan

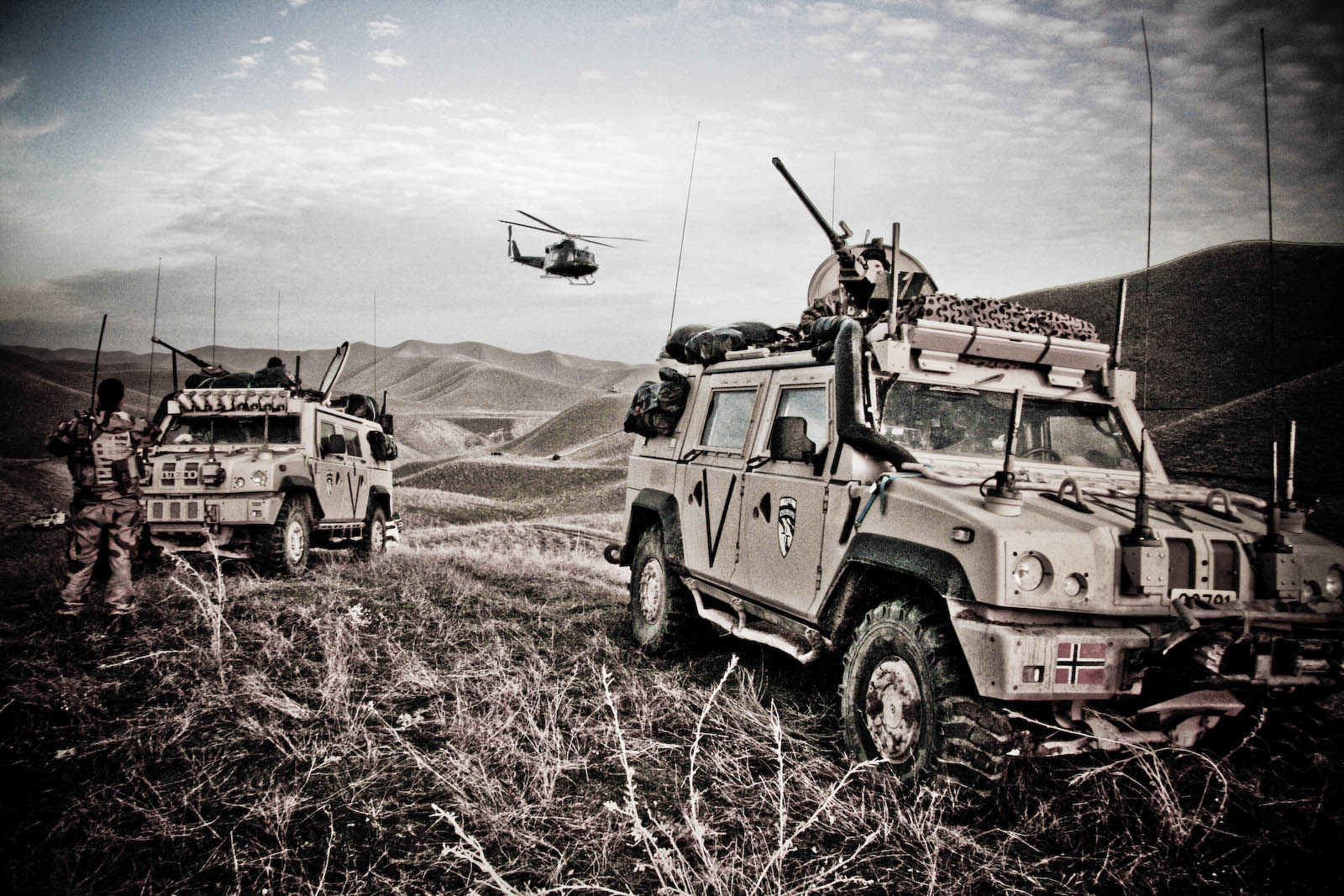
TMBN Afghanistan

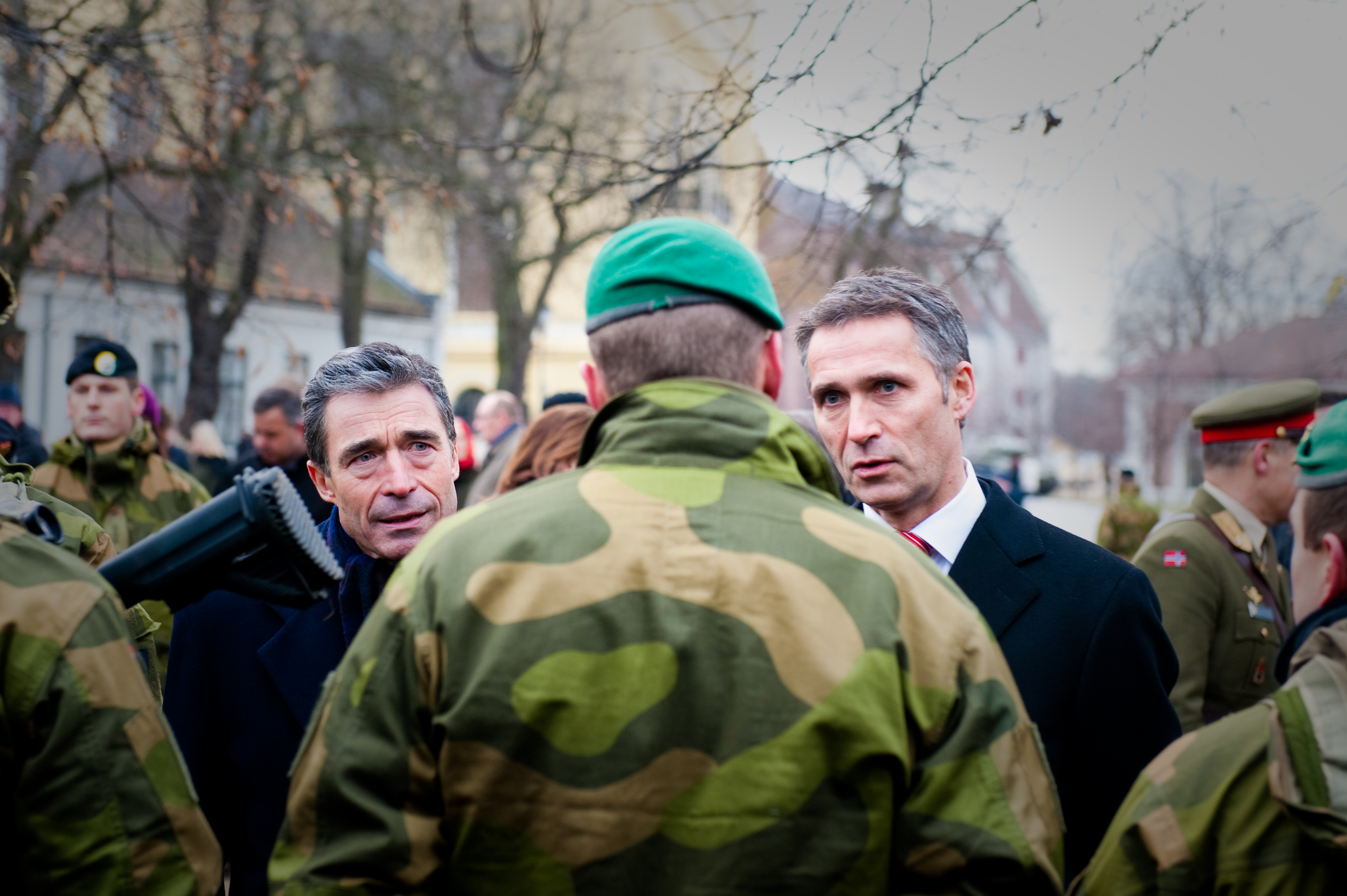
The then Norwegian Prime Minister, and later Secretary General of NATO Jens Stoltenberg (right) and his predecessor, Anders Fogh Rasmussen (left), talk with members of the Telemark Battalion in Oslo.

In addition, the Telemark Battalion frequently trains with the rest of the Norwegian Army High Reaction Force. This is a composite unit made up of the Telemark Battalion, as well as enlisted personnel from support capabilities, ranging from artillery to military police.

The Telemark Battalion was one of the infantry battalions assigned to the NATO Response Force during the NRF-4 rotation from January to July 2005; the others were Regiment Johan Willem Friso and Regiment Van Heutsz of the Dutch Army and Fallschirmjägerbataillon 373 of the German Army.

Telemark Battalion is the primary source of international contributions from the Norwegian Army. The battalion has almost constantly been involved in the ISAF operation in Afghanistan since 2003.

== Incidents in Afghanistan ==
Starting in the summer of 2009, there were several instances of soldiers from the unit spray painting a Punisher skull (in part inspired by the Punisher comic book and movie character) on houses and property belonging to Afghans whom soldiers suspected of having ties to the insurgency. The purported purpose was to "send a message", to leaders of the insurgency, that the Norwegian soldiers would not allow them to continue their offensive.

In September 2010, Verdens Gang reported that some soldiers were still using a Punisher skull that had been prohibited by the leadership of Norway's military.

The alleged crimes of threatening and spray painting the property of suspected insurgents did not lead to any criminal charges.

== Battle cry ==
In 2010, Dagbladet published a video of company commander Rune Wenneberg leading a battle cry ("To Valhalla") by soldiers of the unit — his intro to the cry was "you are the hunters. you are the predators. Taliban is now the prey. To Valhalla!""

In 2011, Dag Herbjørnsrud wrote in an editorial that "Prime Minister Kjell Magne Bondevik wasn't sending soldiers into war — he was merely supplying manpower to a "peacekeeping mission". Is it odd that the media was surprised by Norwegian soldiers using Viking helmets and battle cries of Vikings?"

== Deployments ==
- 1997–1999: SFOR in Bosnia and Herzegovina
- 1999–2002: KFOR in Kosovo
- 2003: in Iraq
- 2003–2004: The unit was temporarily handed over to ISAF, and thereafter deployed to Kabul in Afghanistan
- 2005–2006: ISAF at Kabul in Afghanistan
- 2006: ISAF at Mazari Sharif, Afghanistan
- 2006–2007: ISAF at Meymaneh, Afghanistan
- 2008: ISAF at Mazari Sharif, Afghanistan
- 2008–2011: ISAF at Meymaneh, Afghanistan
- 2015-2016: Kurdistan Training Coordination Center, Iraq
- 2017-2018: Norwegian Task Unit 1, Iraq
- 2017: Enhanced Forward Presence, Lithuania
- 2020: Norwegian Task Unit 6, Iraq
- 2020: Enhanced Forward Presence 7, Lithuania
- 2020-2021: Enhanced Forward Presence 8, Lithuania
- 2021: Evacuation from Kabul, Tbilisi, Georgia
- 2022: Nor secfor, Iraq
- 2022: Enhanced Forward Presence 11, Lithuania

== Notable soldiers ==
- Joshua French, convicted of murder and espionage in the Democratic Republic of the Congo (DRC) along with Tjostolv Moland and given a death sentence, but released after eight years in prison
- Emil Johansen, author of Brødre i blodet
- Tjostolv Moland, convicted of murder and espionage in the DRC along with Joshua French and given a death sentence, later died in prison while on death row
- Rune Wenneberg
- Aslak Fløgstad Nore, journalist and author of Gud er norsk (God is Norwegian)
- Espen Haugeland, recipient of the War Cross in 2016, Norway's highest decoration for gallantry

== Awards ==
- Armored gunnery competition, Iron Spear Latvia, 2021, 1st place IFV, 2nd Place Tanks
- Sharpshooting, Best squad Germany, 2016, 1st place

== See also ==
- Aslak Nore
