= The Colour Album =

Studio album by Fra Lippo Lippi
- Released: 6 November 1989
- Recorded: Rainbow Studio, Oslo, Norway
- Genre: New Wave, synthpop, pop rock
- Label: The Record Station; BMG (distribution); BMG Pilipinas (Philippines)
- Producer: Johan Ekelund and Fra Lippo Lippi

Fra Lippo Lippi chronology
Light and Shade (1987)	The Colour Album (1989)	Crash of Light (1990)

The Colour Album is the fifth studio album by Norwegian pop rock group Fra Lippo Lippi and the first release after the band severed their ties with Virgin Records.

"Count on Me", "Love Is a Lonely Harbour", and "Mother's Little Soldier" were released as singles to promote this album.

== Production ==
The album was recorded in Rainbow Studio in Oslo and mixed in Stockholm. The band desired to leave behind the American expression of the previous album and cease the use of "synthetic instruments". Among others, it entailed the use of a string quartet rather than a synthesizer. The goal was to make "advanced pop" for "serious listening", not background listening.

== Sales and charts ==
According to Natt og Dag, the album had sold 3,500 copies in Norway as of 1 February 1990. The album did not chart in the Norwegian VG-lista, unlike Fra Lippo Lippi's previous output Songs and Light and Shade.

Despite a successful tour to promote the album in the Philippines, The Colour Album did not do as well as the band's two previous albums. The band parted ways with The Record Station in 1990 and was considering a breakup, but decided to write songs for a new album instead.

== Reception ==
Norway's largest newspaper VG gave a dice throw of 4, stating that the album was more accessible than the previous record, but had inferior melodies to Songs. The trend newspaper Natt og Dag published a positive review, whereas the music paper Nye Takter published by Arbeiderbladet gave the album 4 stars and called it melodic, pleasant, charming and "technically perfect". Aftenposten also wrote a favorable review, praising the variation, with some songs having international hit potential and others being "sophisticated" pop. The album contained several moods, good melodies and a personal touch.

Several other critics underlined that Fra Lippo Lippi had returned to form since their previous output. In Drammen, both Drammens Tidende and Fremtiden gave a dice throw of 5.

However, some still criticized the album and the band for lacking identity. Østlendingen gave 3 stars as the reviewer found the album to be middle-of-the-road. Tønsbergs Blad only gave 2 stars, calling it "somewhat tame" and "monotonous at times".

== Track listing ==
1. "A Little Rain Must Fall"
2. "Mother's Little Soldier"
3. "Under the Same Sun"
4. "You Bring Me Joy"
5. "Love Is a Lonely Harbour"
6. "Count On Me"
7. "ABC"
8. "Childhood Days"
9. "Into the Blue"

== Personnel ==
- Rune Kristoffersen – bass
- Per Øystein Sørensen – vocals, keyboards

with

- Per Lindvall – drums, percussion
- Henrik Janson – guitar, cello
- Tore Elgarøy – guitar
- Lasse Hafreager – accordion
- Nils Petter Molvær – trumpet
- Knut Riisnæs – saxophone
- Bendik Hofseth – saxophone
- Arild Stav – clarinet, flute
- Carl Anders Sponberg – violin
- Atle Sponberg – violin
- Stig-Ove Ose – viola
- Marit Klovning – cello
- Bjørn Kjellemyr – acoustic bass
- Matts Alsberg – acoustic bass
- Per Hillestad – drums, percussion
- Berit Lohne – backing vocals
- Mauro Scocco – backing vocals
