= Bardufoss Airport =

Airport in Bardufoss, Norway

Bardufoss Airport Bardufoss lufthavn

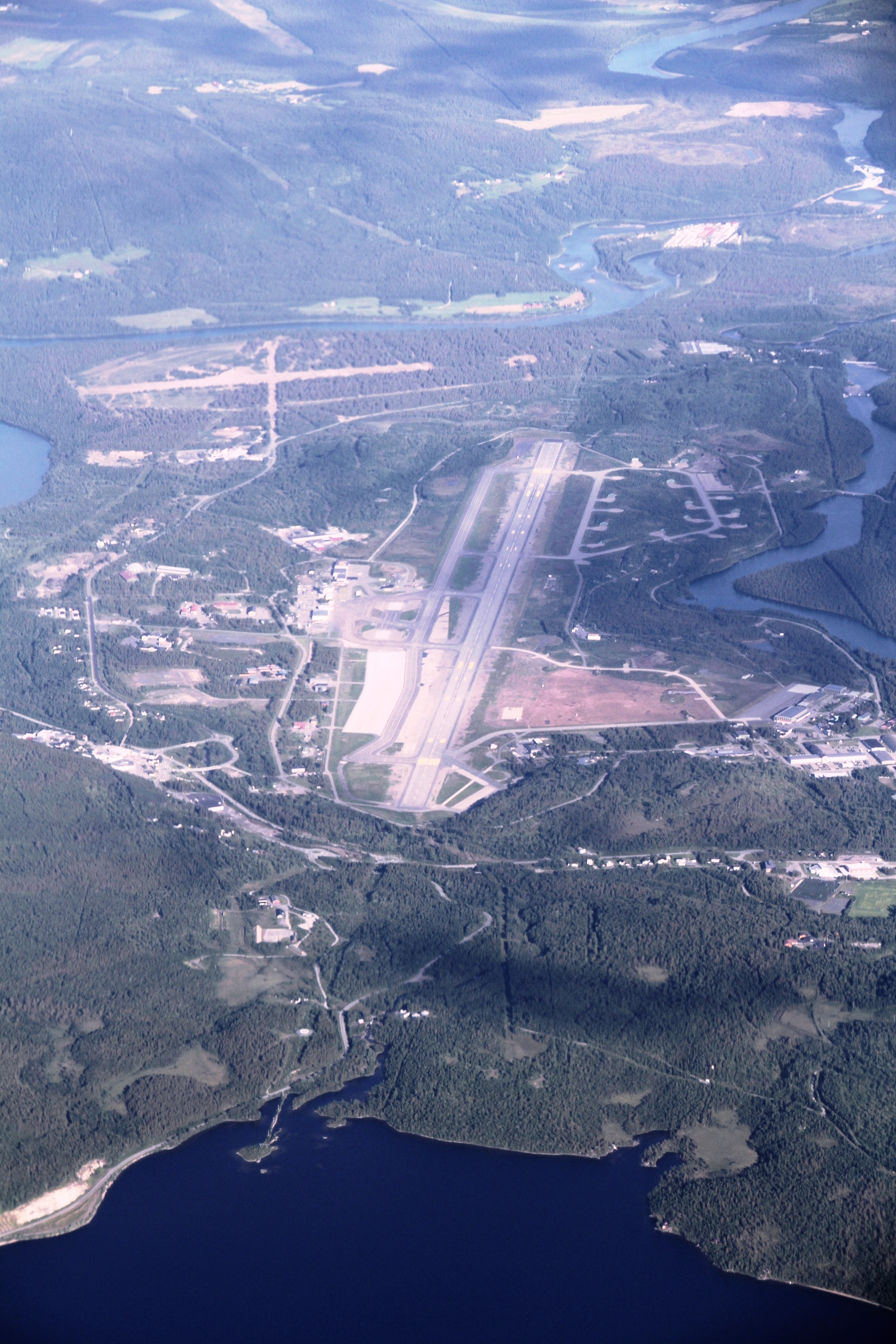
- IATA: BDU; ICAO: ENDU

Summary
- Airport type: Joint (public and military)
- Operator: Avinor
- Serves: Bardufoss, Målselv, Norway
- Elevation AMSL: 77 m / 253 ft
- Coordinates: 69°03′21″N 018°32′25″E
- Website: avinor.no

Map
- Location in Norway

Runways
Direction	Length		Surface
Direction	m	ft	Surface
10/28	2,443	8,015	Asphalt

Statistics (2014)
- Passengers: 218,451
- Aircraft movements: 5,905
- Cargo (tonnes): 62

Bardufoss Airport (Norwegian: Bardufoss lufthavn; IATA: BDU, ICAO: ENDU) is a primary airport situated at Bardufoss in Målselv Municipality in Troms county, Norway. The airport, which is the civilian sector of the Royal Norwegian Air Force's (RNoAF) Bardufoss Air Station, is operated by the state-owned Avinor. It consists of a 2,443-meter (8,015 ft) runway, a parallel taxiway and handled 218,451 passengers in 2014. Norwegian Air Shuttle (Norwegian) operates three daily flights with Boeing 737s to Oslo. The airport's catchment area covers central Troms.

In 1938, the Norwegian Army Air Service completed the air station, which was expanded by them and later the Luftwaffe during World War II. Civilian operations commenced in 1956, with Bardufoss and Bodø Airport being the only land airports in Northern Norway. Services were initially provided by Scandinavian Airlines System (SAS). Bardufoss served Troms and Ofoten, until the 1964 opening of Tromsø Airport and 1973 opening of Harstad/Narvik Airport, Evenes cut away most of the population served. Braathens SAFE started flights to Bardufoss in 1967 and a new arrivals hall opened in 1972. Until 1992 the Norwegian Armed Forces operated their own charter services, after which these were coordinated with civilian scheduled services. Braathens took over the Oslo-route in 1999, a new terminal opened in 2004 and Norwegian Air Shuttle took over the Oslo route in 2008. From February 1, 2020, SAS reinstated year-round flights to Bardufoss after a 12-year gap, establishing three daily flights to and from Oslo, with connections to the SAS and Star Alliance global network. This has since changed to Norwegian Air Shuttle, following the airline winning back the defence contract from SAS in 2023.

== History ==
Bardufoss was selected an emergency landing airfield by the Norwegian Army Air Service in 1934, with construction starting in early 1935. A 200-by-200-meter (660 by 660 ft) area was completed in mid-1936 and tested using a de Havilland Tiger Moth. The Army Air Service decided to expand the airport and built a triangular gravel runway 500-by-400-by-300-meter (1,640 by 1,310 by 980 ft), which became operational from mid-1938. Further expansions were carried out in 1939 and 1940. During the German occupation of Norway the runway was expanded to 1,600 by 80 meters (5,250 by 260 ft) in concrete by the Luftwaffe, and a second runway, 1,850 by 90 meters (6,070 by 300 ft) long, was built at Fossmoen, but never used. The airport was reclaimed by the RNoAF in 1945, who started using a water aerodrome on the lake of Andsvann. A runway extension in 1952 and 1953 to 2,500 meters (8,200 ft) was financed by the North Atlantic Treaty Organization.

A government commission published a report in 1947 which recommended a national plan for civil aviation. It recommended that flights in Northern Norway be carried out using seaplanes, but also noted the possibility of upgrading existing military air stations for civilian use. Scheduled services to Bardufoss started in 1956, with SAS extending its service from Oslo Airport, Fornebu via Trondheim Airport, Værnes to Bodø Airport to Bardufoss. The initial terminal at Bardufoss was half a hangar leased from the air station. Bardufoss was the only land airport north of Bodø and its catchment area included the towns of Tromsø, Harstad and Narvik. Travel time to Narvik was three hours, Harstad was six hours away and Tromsø was 140 kilometers (87 mi) by road. The towns were also served by the coastal seaplane route, but it only operated during the summer. Widerøe launched a seaplane route from the water aerodrome to Tromsø, Alta and Hammerfest. This route lasted until 1963.

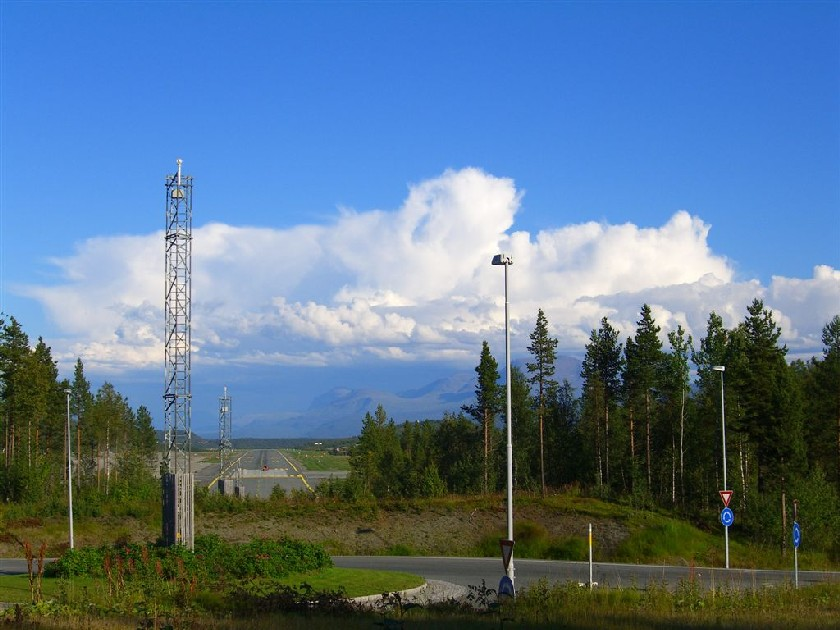
The runway

Three times a week SAS operated a night flight from Bardufoss and Bodø to Oslo, with Andøya Airport, Andenes added in 1964, using a Convair Metropolitan. A new terminal opened in 1962. Three airports were opened in Finnmark in 1963, Alta Airport, Lakselv Airport, Banak and Kirkenes Airport, Høybuktmoen, and the service from Bardufoss was extended to those towns. Tromsø Airport opened the following year, reducing the number of services to Bardufoss. SAS flew the Sud Aviation Caravelle to Bardufoss for the first time in 1963 and introduced the Douglas DC-7 in 1965.

From 1964 the Norwegian Armed Forces organized its own flights through chartered aircraft. Braathens SAFE received permission in 1967 to extend its West Coast route from Bergen to Trondheim onwards to Bodø, Tromsø and Bardufoss. Widerøe took over some of SAS flights between Bodø, Tromsø, Andenes and Bardufoss in 1971. The terminal was extended in 1972 with a new arrivals hall. SAS introduced a freight aircraft on the route from Oslo to Bodø, Bardufoss and Tromsø from 1982, using a Lockheed L-188 Electra operated by Fred. Olsen Airtransport. The route proved unprofitable and was terminated in 1989. The airport was classified as an international airport until 1985. A new cafeteria opened in the terminal in 1988. The airport served 85,300 passengers in 1990.

The Norwegian Aviation College was established at Bardufoss Airport in 1992 as the world's northernmost flight school. It chose the airport because of its difficult weather and terrain in combination with few aircraft movements from commercial aviation. The use of military charter flights was debated from 1976. While they were cost-efficient for the military, merging them with civilian routes would increase the patronage of scheduled services, which would increase frequency and aircraft size. Coordinate flights were introduced in October 1992 and resulted in three weekly services with SAS to Oslo. A new control tower, costing NOK 55 million, was completed in September 1993. Plans for a new terminal commenced with the coordination of civilian and military flights, which had initially resulted in the old civilian terminal being closed. An early proposal was to build a new arrivals hall and keeping the former military terminal as a departures hall. The airport handled 142,100 passengers in 1997.

The armed forces signed an agreement with Braathens, resulting in the airline taking over the three weekly Oslo-services from 1 January 1999. The airport hit a temporary high 190,000 passengers in 2000, largely because of increased military activity. This dropped to 150,000 in 2003. A new terminal opened on 16 January 2004, costing NOK 5.85 million. Construction took four months and the main contractor, Thor Olsen, built the terminal without profits. The old terminal building was demolished free of charge. SAS and Braathens merged in 2004, creating SAS Braathens. The Tromsø bid for the 2018 Winter Olympics, which published its application in 2007, recommended that Bardufoss Airport be the reserve airport for the event and would function as a secondary airport.

Norwegian won the tender for military air transport services from 2008, resulting in the airline commencing flights from Bardufoss to Oslo, with SAS terminating the service. Norwegian issued a tender for ground handling, which resulted in Røros Flyservice winning ahead of the incumbent SAS Ground Services. This resulted in a court case which deemed the action conveyance and forced Røros Flyservice to pay the same wage as in SAS. Røros Flyservice spun operation into the subsidiary Bardufoss Flyservice, which ultimately went bankrupt. SAS operated a summer route from Bardufoss to Oslo each summer from 2010 to 2012. Norwegian started with an intermediate landing in Bodø on one of their daily Oslo flights from 2011. The Ministry of Defence decided in January 2012 to build a new fire station. Estimated to cost between NOK 50 and 100 million, it is scheduled for completion in 2014.

== Facilities ==
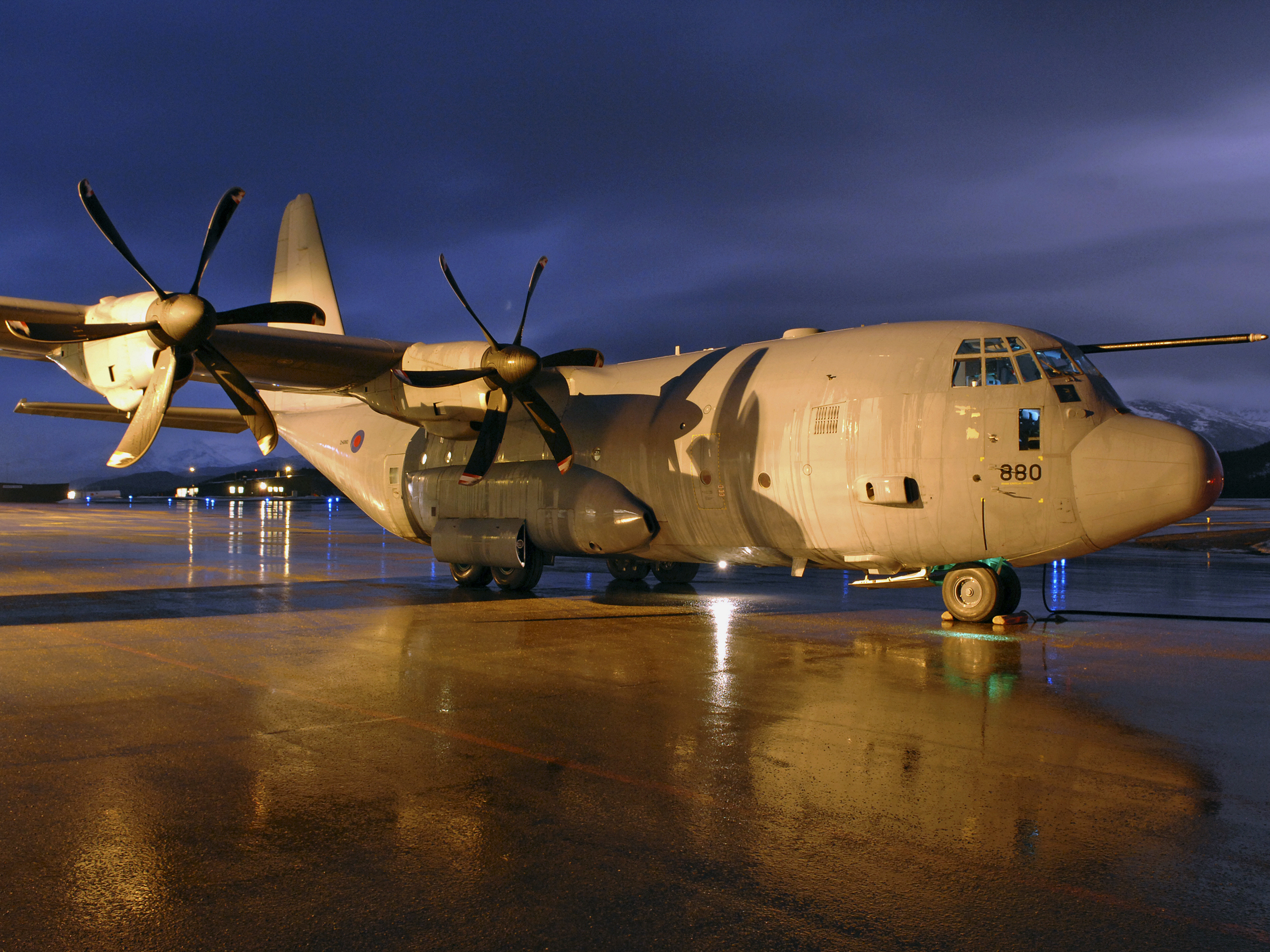
Lockheed C-130 Hercules of RAF Lyneham at Bardufoss

The airport has a runway aligned 10–28 (roughly east–west) with an asphalt surface measuring 2,443 by 45 meters (8,015 ft × 148 ft). It is located at an elevation of 77 meters (253 feet) above mean sea level. SAS Select Service Partner operates a café at the terminal. Cominor operates three airport coach routes—one to Sørreisa, Finnsnes and Silsand; one to Setermoen and one to Maukstadmoen. The airport has 235 paid parking places; taxis and car rental is also available.

Bardufoss Airport is located on the premises of Bardufoss Air Station of the Royal Norwegian Air Force. The air station covers an area of 237 hectares (590 acres) and is home to the 337 and 339 Squadrons. The former operates the Westland Lynx in cooperation with the Coast Guard and the latter operates the Bell 412, largely as support for the Norwegian Army. Bardufoss Air Station is the largest helicopter base in the county, in addition to hosting the air force's aviation school. Allied forces have used Bardufoss as a training ground for fighter aircraft since the 1970s. The school, squadrons and air station are collectively organized as part of the 139th Air Wing. Målselv Municipality and Bardu Municipality host most of the army's Northern Brigade.

== Airlines and destinations ==
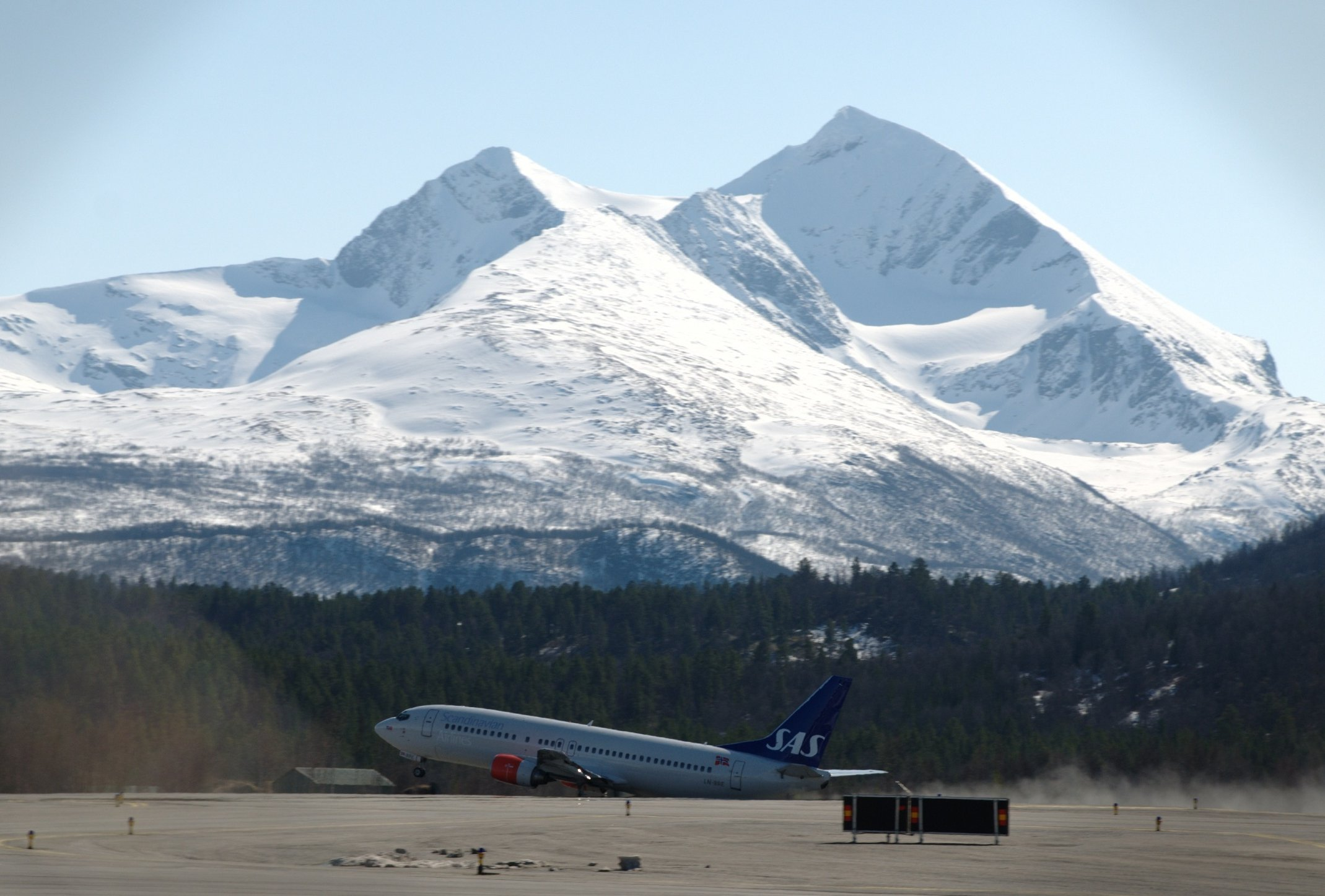
Scandinavian Airlines Boeing 737 taking off from Bardufoss Airport

Norwegian Air Shuttle is the only airline serving the airport with scheduled flights, consisting of three daily flights to Oslo Airport, Gardermoen. The Norwegian Armed Forces is the largest purchaser of travel at the airport and operations are based on a contract between the two parties, resulting in scheduled flights. The airport handled 207,650 passengers, 5,279 aircraft movements and 56 tonnes of cargo in 2013.

Airlines	Destinations
Norwegian Air Shuttle	Oslo

== Statistics ==
Annual passenger traffic
Year	Passengers	% Change
2025	199,535	▼ -3.5%
2024	206,846	▲0.8%
2023	205,213	▲14.1%
2022	179,853	▲40.6%
2021	127,897	▼ -4.6%
2020	134,040	▼ -45.6%
2019	246,420	▲2.0%
2018	241,664	▼ -0.6%
2017	243,104	▲0.2%
2016	242,716	▲7.4%
2015	225,893	

== Accidents and incidents ==
Scandinavian Airlines System Flight 347, an SAS-operated McDonnell Douglas MD-82 en route to Bodø Airport and Oslo Airport, Fornebu, was hijacked by Haris Keč on 3 November 1994. The Bosnian living in Norway made demands that Norwegian authorities help to stop the humanitarian suffering in his home country caused by the Bosnian War. None of the crew of 6 and 122 passengers were injured in the incident, which ended with a surrender at Oslo Airport, Gardermoen seven hours later.
