= Light and Shade =

Light and Shade may refer to:

- Light + Shade, a 2005 two-disc album by English musician Mike Oldfield
- Light and Shade (This Ascension album), 1991
- Light and Shade (Fra Lippo Lippi album), 1987

== See also ==
- Lights and Shadows (disambiguation)
