= Fjellstrand =

Fjellstrand may refer to any one of the following:

- Fjellstrand is a village in Nesodden, Akershus, Norway.
- Fjellstrand A.S. - Is a modern shipyard in Norway, focusing on newbuilds, refurbishments and offshore constructions. Head office is in Omastrand.
