= Fra Lippo Lippi (band) =

Norwegian band

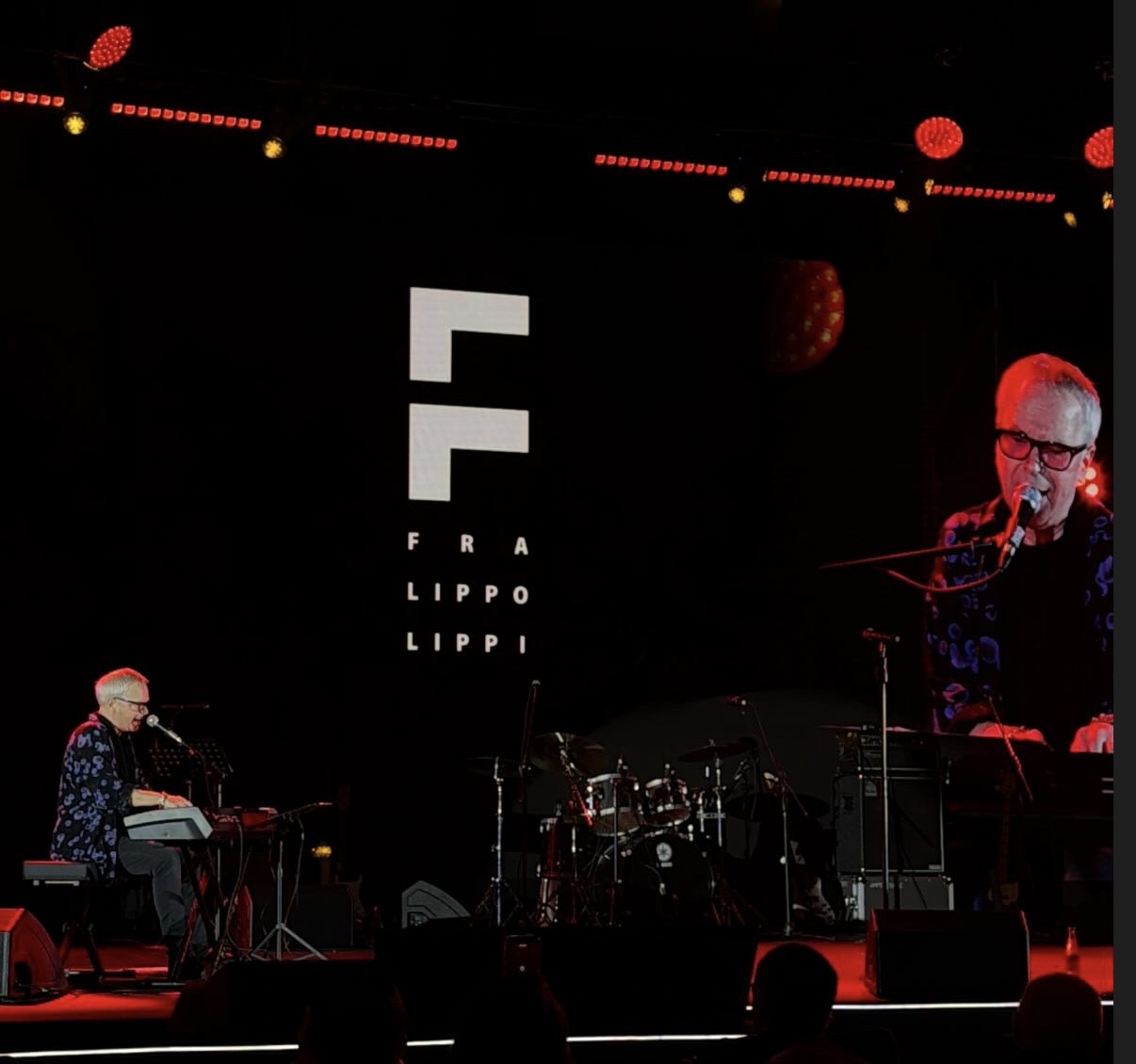
- Fra Lippo Lippi in 2026

Background information
- Also known as: Genetic Control (1978–80)
- Origin: Nesodden, Norway
- Genres: New wave; synth-pop; jazz; post-punk (early work); gothic rock (early work)
- Years active: 1978–present
- Labels: UK Records; Virgin Records; Rune Grammofon
- Members: Per Øystein Sørensen
- Past members: Rune Kristoffersen; Morten Sjøberg; Øyvind Kvalnes; Bjørn Sorknes
- Website: www.fralippolippi.com

Fra Lippo Lippi is a Norwegian new wave solo project currently fronted by Per Øystein Sørensen. Originally formed in 1978 as Genetic Control by Rune Kristoffersen, Bjørn Sorknes, and Morten Sjøberg, they had several hits in the 1980s, such as "Shouldn't Have to Be Like That", "Everytime I See You" and "Light and Shade". The band name is derived from Robert Browning's poem about the Renaissance painter Filippo Lippi.

In 1981, before the release of its debut album In Silence, Sorknes departed from the band, and the following year, Per Øystein Sørensen was inducted as the band's lead vocalist in time for the release of its second album Small Mercies (1983). After Small Mercies, Fra Lippo Lippi became a four-piece band with the inclusion of Øyvind Kvalnes as a keyboardist and released the third album Songs (1985), with Sorknes guest appearing for the album's single 'Say Something". However, Kvalnes, as well as Sornes and Sjøberg all departed from the band citing personal reasons, leaving Kristoffersen and Sørensen as the remaining members.

As a two-piece band and signed into Virgin Records, Songs was re-released worldwide in 1986 while Kristoffersen and Sørensen recorded the follow-up album Light and Shade (1987). Upon release to a poor sales performance, the band parted ways with Virgin Records and signed into BMG. In 1988, the Fra Lippo Lippi became the first Norwegian act to perform in the Philippines, where there is a large following of listeners for the band's new wave genre. The following year, the band independently released The Colour Album (1989) to a mixed critical and sales reception, while its non-album single "Sitches and Burns" became successful in the Philippines.

In 2002, Kristoffersen left the band, leaving Sørensen as its sole remaining member. Sørensen released In the Brilliant White exclusively in the Philippines, featuring Filipino singer Kyla in the album's second single "Wish We Were Two", before eventually releasing the album in Norway. As of 2026, Sørensen continues to write and record music, sometimes performing live, occasionally with his touring musicians, in Norway and the Philippines.

== History ==
Fra Lippo Lippi was founded in Nesodden, Norway in 1980 by Rune Kristoffersen (bass, guitar, keyboards), Morten Sjøberg (drums, keyboards) and Bjørn Sorknes (bass, keyboards). They released a 4-track instrumental EP that year, titled Tap Dance for Scientists. Two years prior, the group was writing and rehearsing under the name Genetic Control.

In 1981, Sorknes left as the band was writing songs for their debut album. The band, which then consisted of the duo of Kristoffersen and Sjøberg, recorded and released In Silence under Uniton Records. Inspired by British post-punk band Joy Division, the album received some favourable reviews and was distributed in several European countries. In the Netherlands and Belgium, it sold better than in their native Norway.

In 1982, Kristoffersen and Sjøberg began writing and recording their next album. A single, "Now and Forever", was released in April 1982. Their music developed into a more melodic sound and they realised that they needed to recruit a vocalist. In 1983, Per Øystein Sørensen came on board as the band's lead vocalist for their second album Small Mercies. The single "The Treasure", featuring a less dense, more melodic sound with piano as the central instrument, was a foretaste of album and the band's new sound. They now had a brighter, more pop-oriented sound and received a number of positive reviews in their home country and in the British music press.

In late 1983, they were joined by keyboardist Øyvind Kvalnes. Having previously performed live on only a few occasions with pre-recorded tapes, the band wished to develop their live sound, but Kvalnes also proved to make significant contributions to their songwriting. Their first release as a quartet was the single "Say Something" in 1984 on which former member Bjørn Sorknes guested on bass.

In 1985, their third album was recorded at Polar Studios in Stockholm. Having parted ways with Uniton, the band financed the recording themselves as there was no interest from any labels. It was released as Songs on their own Easter Productions label to positive reviews; some critics hailed it as the best pop album ever made in Norway and 5,000 copies were sold in Norway without the aid of singles or promotion.

=== As a duo, 1986–2002 ===
Months after Songs was released, the band was signed to Virgin Records. At this point, Sjøberg and Kvalnes departed at the prospect of giving up their day jobs for the uncertain careers as professional musicians, leaving Kristoffersen and Sørensen as the only two members. Songs was re-recorded and remixed for the international market in 1986. This version of the album included a new song titled "Everytime I See You", a reworking of an earlier song, "A Small Mercy" from the album Small Mercies. The band also scored a hit single in Europe with "Shouldn't Have to Be Like That", a double A-side with "The Distance Between Us".

In 1987, the band recorded and released their follow-up album Light and Shade in Los Angeles, CA, with the producing aid of Walter Becker. The album received positive reviews, but was not the commercial success that was expected. Shortly after the album's release, they were dropped by Virgin Records.

The band however gained a huge popularity in the Philippines and prompted them to tour the country in 1988. In Manila, their shows sold out six times over two weekends.

The band continued to record and release further albums independently, starting with 1989's The Colour Album on the Swedish label The Record Station. A live album titled Crash of Light was released in the Philippines in 1990. That same year, the band was dropped by The Record Station. The duo considered splitting up, but eventually decided to continue as Fra Lippo Lippi and released the self-produced album Dreams in 1992. The song "Stitches and Burns" became very popular in the Philippines. In 1995, the band released their first compilation album The Best of Fra Lippo Lippi '85–'95. Selected tracks originally from Songs, Light and Shade and The Colour Album were re-recorded. Two years later, another compilation was released in the Philippines. The Virgin Years - Greatest Hits featured tracks directly licensed from Virgin Records.

In 2002, Kristoffersen retired from the band to focus on his record label Rune Grammofon.

=== 2002–present: Sørensen as sole member ===
In 2002, with Sorensen now only the sole member, the album In a Brilliant White was released under the Fra Lippo Lippi name which contains mostly Sorensen's works and was initially produced and released only in the Philippines. The first single "Later" became a hit in the Philippines even before the album was released, hence EMI Philippines (now PolyEast Records) decided to produce a full-length album with it. It also features a collaboration single, "Wish We Were Two" featuring Filipino singer Kyla. This album was also released in Norway eventually, following releases over other countries in Asia.

In September 2009, Sørensen released Våge, his first solo album and his first-ever work in Norwegian. An English version titled Master of Imperfection was released in 2012.

Sorensen continues to tour Metro Manila and other parts of the Philippines. In 2015, he was the support act of British new wave band Spandau Ballet when they performed in Manila. On 6 December 2018, Sorensen performed at the Newport Performing Arts Theater accompanied by the Manila Philharmonic Orchestra. On 16 and 17 June 2023, Sorensen performed at the Theatre at Solaire and at the Santa Rosa Sports Complex respectively. He continues to write and record music with his own band in his home country of Norway.

== Personnel ==
=== Current members ===
- Per Øystein Sørensen – vocals (1982–present)

=== Former members ===
- Rune Kristoffersen – bass, keyboards (1978–2002)
- Morten Sjøberg – drums (1978–1985)
- Øyvind Kvalnes – keyboards (1984–1985)
- Bjørn Sorknes – keyboards, guitar, vocals (1978–1981)

== Discography ==
=== Albums ===
- In Silence (1981)
- Small Mercies (1983)
- Songs (1985)
- Songs (international version) (1986)
- Light and Shade (1987)
- The Colour Album (1989)
- Dreams (1992)
- In a Brilliant White (2002)

=== Live albums ===
- Crash of Light (1990)

=== Compilations ===
- The Best of Fra Lippo Lippi '85–'95 (1995)
- The Virgin Years – Greatest Hits (1997)
- The Early Years (2003) (re-release of In Silence and Small Mercies)
- The Best of Fra Lippo Lippi (2005)
- The Essential Fra Lippo Lippi: Essence & Rare (2005)
- Fra Lippo Lippi (2011) (4-album box set)
- Rarum 80-95 (2018) (singles rarities, 1980–1995)

=== Singles and EPs ===
- Tap Dance for Scientists (1980)
- "In Silence" (1981)
- "Now and Forever" (1982)
- "A Small Mercy" (1982)
- "The Treasure" (1983)
- "Say Something" (1984)
- "Leaving" (1985)
- "Shouldn't Have to Be Like That"/"The Distance Between Us" (1986) - NOR #4, NETH #29, BEL #39, UK #81
- "Everytime I See You" (1986)
- "Come Summer" (1986)
- "Light and Shade" (1987)
- "Angel" (1987)
- "Beauty and Madness" (1988)
- "Some People" (1988)
- "Count on Me" (1989)
- "Love Is a Lonely Harbour" (1989)
- "Mothers Little Soldier" (1990)
- "Stitches and Burns" (1990)
- "Thief in Paradise" (1992)
- "Everybody Everywhere" (1995)
- "Later" (2002)
- "Story of a Broken Heart" (2002)
- "Stay This Time" (2024)
