= In Silence =

In Silence may refer to:

- In Silence (album), an album by Fra Lippo Lippi
- In Silence (film), 2014 film directed by Zdeněk Jiráský
- "In Silence" (song), a song by Luna Sea
- "In Silence", a song by Kevin Coyne, from his 1980 album Sanity Stomp

== See also ==
- In the Silence, a 2013 album by Ásgeir
