= The Distance Between Us =

Single by Fra Lippo Lippi

from the album Songs
- A-side: "Shouldn't Have to Be Like That"
- B-side: "Say Something" "Shouldn't Have to Be Like That" (original version) "Everytime I See You" (Philippines 7")
- Released: 1986
- Recorded: 1985
- Genre: New wave
- Length: 3:53
- Label: Virgin Records
- Songwriter(s): Per Øystein Sørensen, Rune Kristoffersen, Morten Sjøberg, Øyvind Kvalnes
- Producer(s): Kaj Erixon

"The Distance Between Us" is a song by Norwegian new wave group Fra Lippo Lippi, first released in 1985 on their third studio album Songs, on the band's own label, Easter Productions. The song was remixed for the 1986 international reissue of the album on Virgin Records. It was released as a 12" double A-side single with "Shouldn't Have to Be Like That", which reached No. 4 in Norway and No. 81 on the UK Singles Chart in early 1986.

In the Philippines, "The Distance Between Us" was released there as an A-side with "Everytime I See You" as the B-side. Both songs became a huge success in that country. Due to the popularity of both songs in the Philippines, Sørensen has performed these plus many other Fra Lippo Lippi songs on numerous occasions there. "Everytime I See You" was included on the 1986 release of the album Songs.
