= Just Like Me =

Just Like Me may refer to:

- "Just Like Me" (Paul Revere & the Raiders song), 1965
- "Just Like Me" (Jamie Foxx song), 2008
- "Just Like Me", a song by A Boogie wit da Hoodie from the 2018 album Hoodie SZN
- "Just Like Me", a song by Britney Spears from the 2016 album Glory
- "Just Like Me", a song by DMC featuring Sarah McLachlan from the 2006 album Checks Thugs and Rock n Roll
- "Just Like Me", a song by Fra Lippo Lippi from the 1985 album Songs
- "Just Like Me", a song by Helmet from the 2004 album Size Matters
- "Just Like Me", a song by Holly Valance from the 2003 album State of Mind
- "Just Like Me", a song by Jay Rock featuring J. Black from the 2011 album Follow Me Home
- "Just Like Me", a song by Jeff Hanson from the 2003 album Son
- "Just Like Me", a song by L7 from the 1990 album Smell the Magic
- "Just Like Me", a song by Poco from the 1976 album Rose of Cimarron
- "Just Like Me", a song by Usher from the 1997 album My Way
- "Just Like Me", a song from Disney, 1994
- Just Like Me, a 1981 album by Terry Gregory
- Just Like Me, a 2011 album by Alex Chu
