= No. 337 Squadron RNoAF =

- Active: 1950–64; 1980–current
- Country: Norway
- Branch: Royal Norwegian Air Force
- Role: Maritime helicopter
- Part of: 139th Air Wing
- Garrison/HQ: Bardufoss Air Station
- Engagements: Gulf War; Operation Recsyr

Aircraft flown
- Fighter: Vampire (1950–54); F-86K Sabre (1955–64)
- Transport: Lynx (1980–2014); NH90 (2011–2022); MH-60R (2025-)

The 337 Squadron (Norwegian: 337-skvadronen) is a maritime helicopter unit of the Royal Norwegian Air Force (RNoAF). Based at Bardufoss Air Station, the squadron most recently operated eight NHIndustries NH90 until June 2022. The helicopters were used by the Norwegian Coast Guard and served on the Nordkapp-class, the Barentshav-class and on NoCGV Svalbard.

The unit was created on 1 May 1950 to operate de Havilland Vampire Mk. 52 fighter-bombers. The squadron was stationed at Gardermoen Air Station, although from 1952 a detachment was allocated to Bardufoss. From April 1953, 337 was based at Værnes Air Station. The Vampires were retired in 1954 and 337 was made a storage unit. It was reactivated as an operational unit on 1 September 1955, returning to Gardermoen. It then operated the North American F-86K Sabre. This role lasted 1 September 1963, when the squadron was deactivated. The squadron was reactivated on 1 January 1980 and based at Bardufoss. Its new role was to operate six Westland Lynx helicopters for the newly created Coast Guard. The NH90 replacements were ordered in 2001, but delays caused the Lynxes to remain in service until 2014. The performance of the NH90 proved to be unsatisfactory and the government abruptly retired them in June 2022. The squadron is scheduled to receive six MH-60R Seahawks between 2025 and 2027.

== History ==
=== Vampire ===
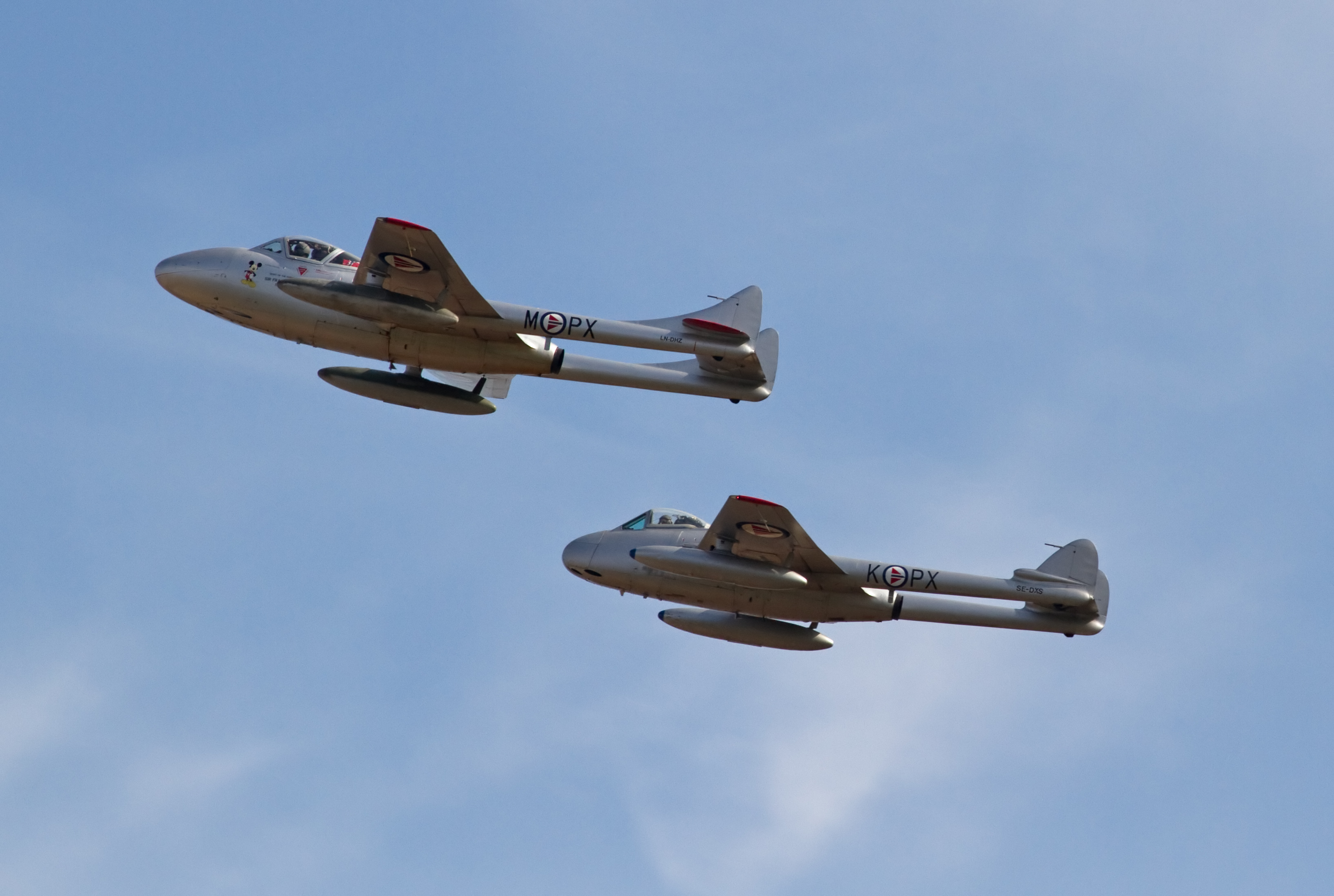
Heritage Norwegian Vampires

During the build-up of the RNoAF, a central part was the establishment of a fleet of jet aircraft. After rejecting the Gloster Meteor, the air force opted for the de Havilland Vampire. The first order was made on 26 January 1948. All in all Norway bought 62 Vampires, consisting of 20 Mk 3 fighter jets, 36 Mk 52 fighter-bombers and 6 Mk 55 trainers. The first Vampires were delivered on 29 April 1948, constituting the start of the delivery of the Mk 3 and Mk 55s. These entered service with the 336 Squadron based at Gardermoen Air Station.

With the delivery of the Mk 52 Vampires from 1950, the quantity exceeded that of which the 336 Squadron could operate. This also involved a split in roles. The existing Mk 3 Vampires would remain with the 336 Squadron and be used for interception and air defence; the new Mk 52s and the 337 Squadron were given the task of bombing ground targets. Both would be based at Gardermoen Air Station.

By early 1950 the number of Vampires in the 336 Squadron was sufficiently large that they allowed some Vampires to be transferred to the new squadron. The 337 Squadron was therefore established on 22 May 1950. It was largely made up of newly trained soldiers and was to begin with characterized with a lack of experience in management and operations. Within a year it had twelve aircraft. Training was conducted at the Marka field outside Lista Air Station.

Aircraft were flown home from the United Kingdom via RAF Gütersloh in West Germany. This base was also regularly used for international training. The 337 Squadron also participated in an international exercise at RAF North Weald. One aircraft crashed after a mid-air collision over Enebakk in 1950. Three aircraft were written off and one pilot killed in late 1951 at or near Gardermoen. Two aircraft collided over Nesodden the following year. The squadron received two Vampire trainers in late 1952.

The 337 Squadron gradually received more missions in Northern Norway. With the delivery of new Republic F-84 Thunderjets to the 336 Squadron, the remaining Mk 3 Vampires were transferred to the 337 Squadron in 1952. From 1 November the squadron was given responsibility for air defence in Northern Norway. A detachment was stationed Bardufoss Air Station. It had at any given time about six to eight Vampires. The detachment suffered six write-offs and fatal accidents.

Between 17 and 27 April 1953 the squadron was relocated to Værnes Air Station and became subordinate Air Command Trøndelag. Shooting training took place at Tautra, which opened in May of that year. There were two accidents that summer, one which was fatal. The unit participated in an exercise during the summer, when it was temporary located at Tønsberg Airport, Jarlsberg. In most of September 1954 the squadron was placed at Bardufoss for training. The Vampires were taken out of active service from late 1954.

=== Sabre ===
From 1 January 1955 the squadron was dedicated as a storage unit, relocated to Gardermoen and made responsible for storing 42 Vampires and 49 other aircraft of a wide range of obsolete models. Nearly all staff of the squadron was relocated, anticipating the arrival of the North American F-86K Sabre. The reactivation took place on 1 September 1955 and the first Sabre landed at Gardermoen twelve days later. Training was initially carried out with the Lockheed T-33A. The first F-86K was airborne on 1 November. The Sabres were intended for defence against possible Soviet attacks, using ground-controlled interception. They were all-weather fighters and advanced compared to the air force's other fighters. The 337 Squadron was therefore manned with experienced fighter crews.

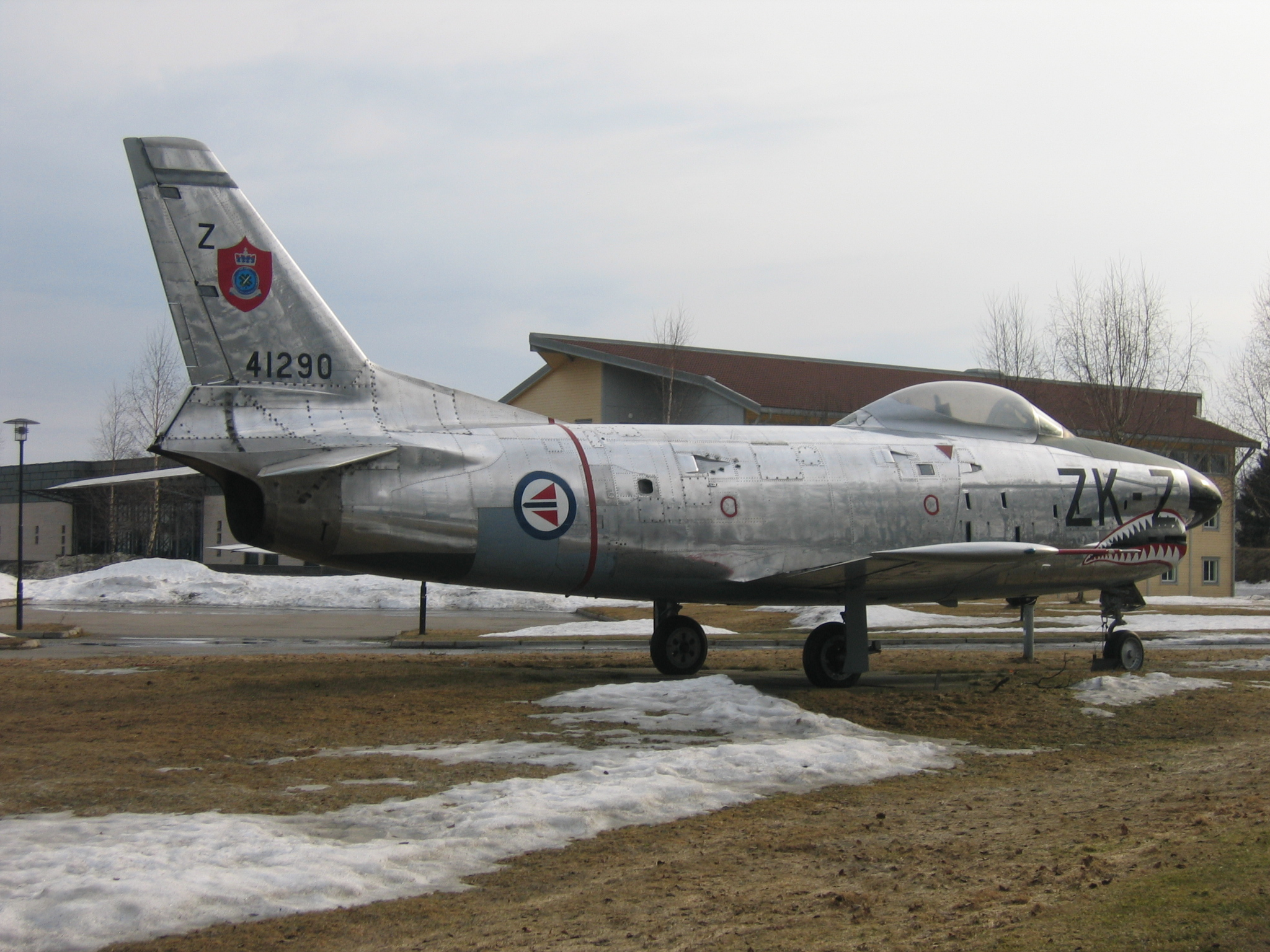
Preserved Norwegian F-86K

Four aircraft and equipment were destroyed in a hangar fire on 10 March 1956. The new 337 Squadron was declared operative in April. Norway initially took delivery of 60 F-86Ks during 1955 & 1956, of which half were allocated to the 337 Squadron and the other half to the 339 Squadron. Additionally four aircraft, of which two were allocated to 337, were delivered in June 1957 from Fiat licence-built production.

The Sabre was a technically demanding aircraft, both to operate and to maintain. Assistance was needed through 1957 to train the crews. In the first years technical faults caused a high portion of grounded aircraft. In particular the electronic fuel controller and the radar would frequently break down. Lack of sufficient hangar capacity, forcing the aircraft to be stored outdoors, and insufficient training of mechanics contributed to the issues. These issues were aggravated by a high turnover amongst mechanics at Gardermoen.

The squadron had two fatal accidents, in June and July 1958. They grounded the fleet and resulted in the installation of ejection seats. For the rest of the Sabres operation history the squadron had no accidents. For a longer period of 1959 they were operating out of Torp Air Station. F-86Ks were from 1961 gradually transferred to the 334 Squadron, which rebuilt them to F-86F. By 1963 the number of Sabres in Southern Norway was sufficiently small that the 332 and the 337 squadrons could merge. This took effect 1 September 1963, with the 332 Squadron taking over operations and the 337 Squadron being deactivated.

=== Lynx ===
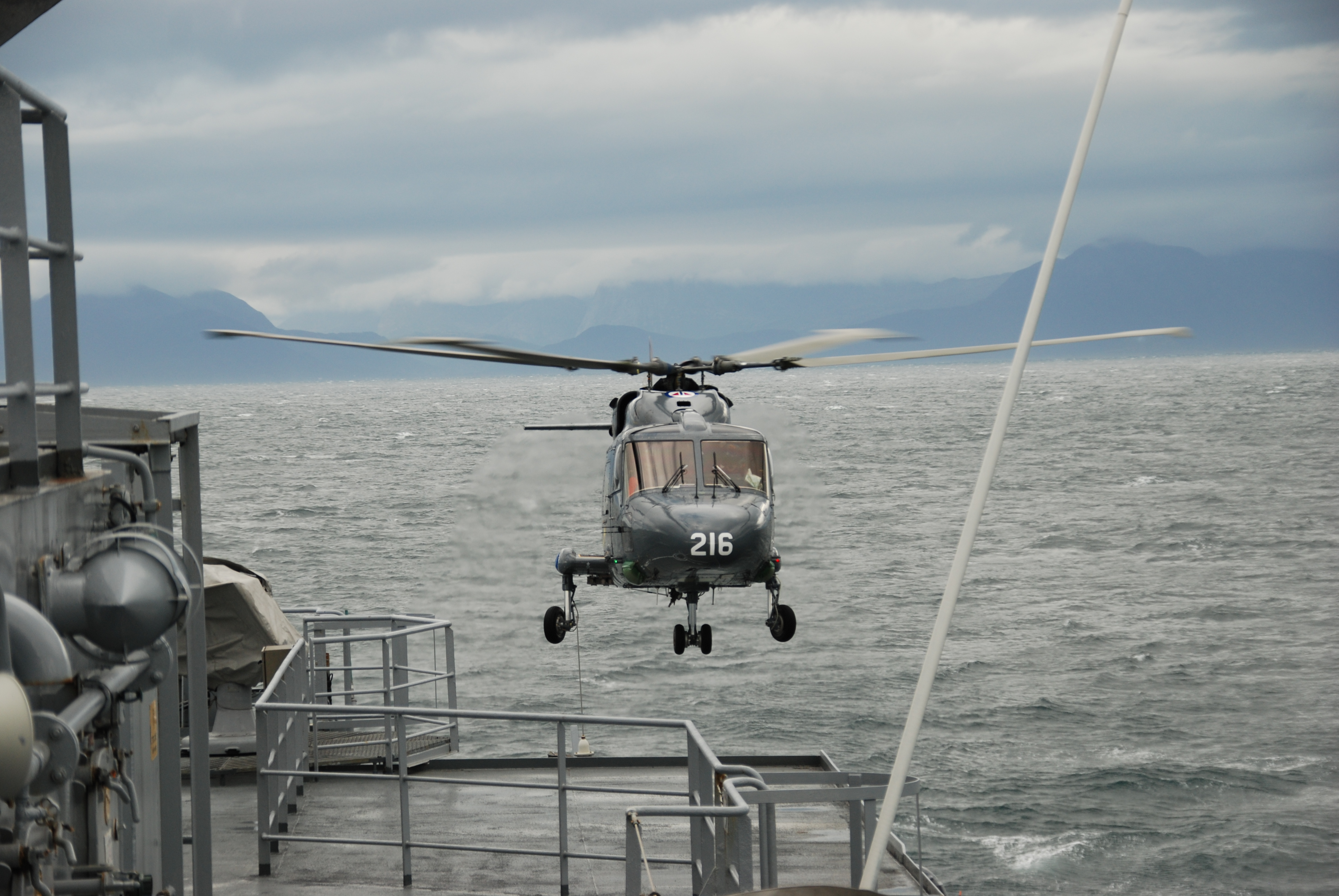
Westland Lynx landing on NoCGV Senja

During the 1960s and 1970s Norway carried out several extensions of its fisheries zone and established an exclusive economic zone. This led to discussion on the establishment of a coast guard. The Military Fisheries Surveillance represented one of very few exceptions in which military force could be used against Norwegian civilians. Several organizational models were discarded, including a civilian agency, a continuation of an integrated model and a virtual coast guard made up of units from various branches. Instead the coast guard was organized as a separate unit under the navy. An important argument was to avoid duplicating services, such as an operative headquarters and naval bases. Meanwhile, the coast guard could act as a military presence to assert sovereignty.

The premise for the coast guard was that its largest offshore patrol vessels, the Nordkapp-class, would be equipped with helicopters. A 1976 commission considered the options and concluded that three rotorcraft met the criteria: the Westland Lynx, the Sikorsky S-76 and the Sikorsky SH-60 Seahawk. It recommended the Seahawk, citing its supreme range, de-icing and cabin space. It was also suitable as to provide a unified helicopter fleet for the Air Force. The Navy preferred the Lynx, emphasizing its low cost, manoeuvrability, that most North Sea-countries were purchasing it and that it already was in British service. The Seahawk would not be operational until 1984. Parliament approved the purchase of six units in 1978.

The squadron was reactivated on 1 January 1980. Bardufoss Air Station was a natural choice for the base of the helicopters. It was the only airbase in Northern Norway to have an existing squadron of helicopters and it was the only airbase to have sufficient space to house a new squadron. The base was prepared through the construction of a new main hangar and several auxiliary buildings. However, only a year after the squadron moved in were the buildings completed.

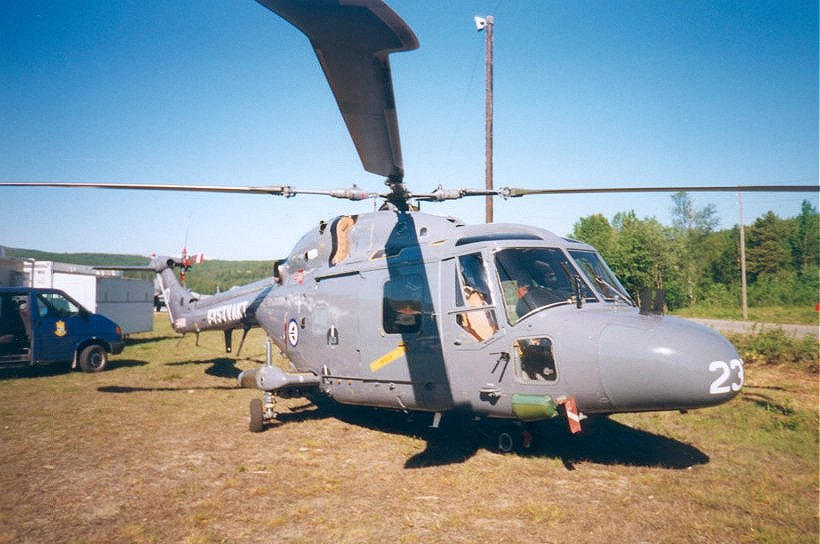
Westland Lynx at Bardufoss Air Station in 1998

Training initially took place at RNAS Yeovilton, and the first Lynx landed at Bardufoss on 4 October 1981. In addition to the Nordkapp-class, the Lynxes trained with HNoMS Horten. During one of these missions it carried out its first live search and rescue mission, in the search after the Widerøe Flight 933 on 11 March 1982. The combination of naval and air force operations caused a significant amount of friction and initially there were difficulties with cooperation. As the training progressed most of these issues were resolved. The main issue was related to the border between the command of the helicopters between the ship's captain and the helicopter's pilot. The squadron was declared operative in May 1983.

The Lynx proved unreliable for the first decade of operation. The aircraft had a large number of technical problems, which were aggravated through long delivery times for spare parts. Secondly the 337 had high turnover, amongst both pilots and mechanics. This caused an excessive number of flight hours to be used for training instead of service. The latter was largely solved when the number of crew members was cut from six to three. This gave each crew member more tasks, which increased the contentment and decreased turnover. Along with Denmark, Germany and Netherlands, a simulator was bought. This allowed more training there. Combined this allowed the Lynx to operate the requested number of service hours from 1992.

Andenes carried out two research expeditions to the Antarctic, in 1984–85 and 1989–90 as part of the Pro Mare research program. It was also used to signal the Norwegian territorial claim to Dronning Maud Land and the Weddell Sea. Andenes also participated in the Gulf War as Norway's contribution. It acted as a support ship of the Royal Danish Navy's Olfert Fischer frigate. Andenes was dispatched to the Mediterranean Sea in May 2014 to participate in the destruction of Syria's chemical weapons. Replacing the frigate Helge Ingstad, Andenes was used to escort the freighter MV Taiko.

The Lynxes were originally planned retired about 2005. However, delays with the delivery of the successors forced the Air Force to retain their Lynxes for a further nine years. Several of the helicopters exceeded their designed lifetime of 7,000 flight-hours by 2,000 hours. In the end the lack of spare parts was the main hindrance towards keeping the fleet airborne. The last departure from a Coast Guard vessel took place on 7 December 2014, after which the type was officially retired.

=== NH90 ===
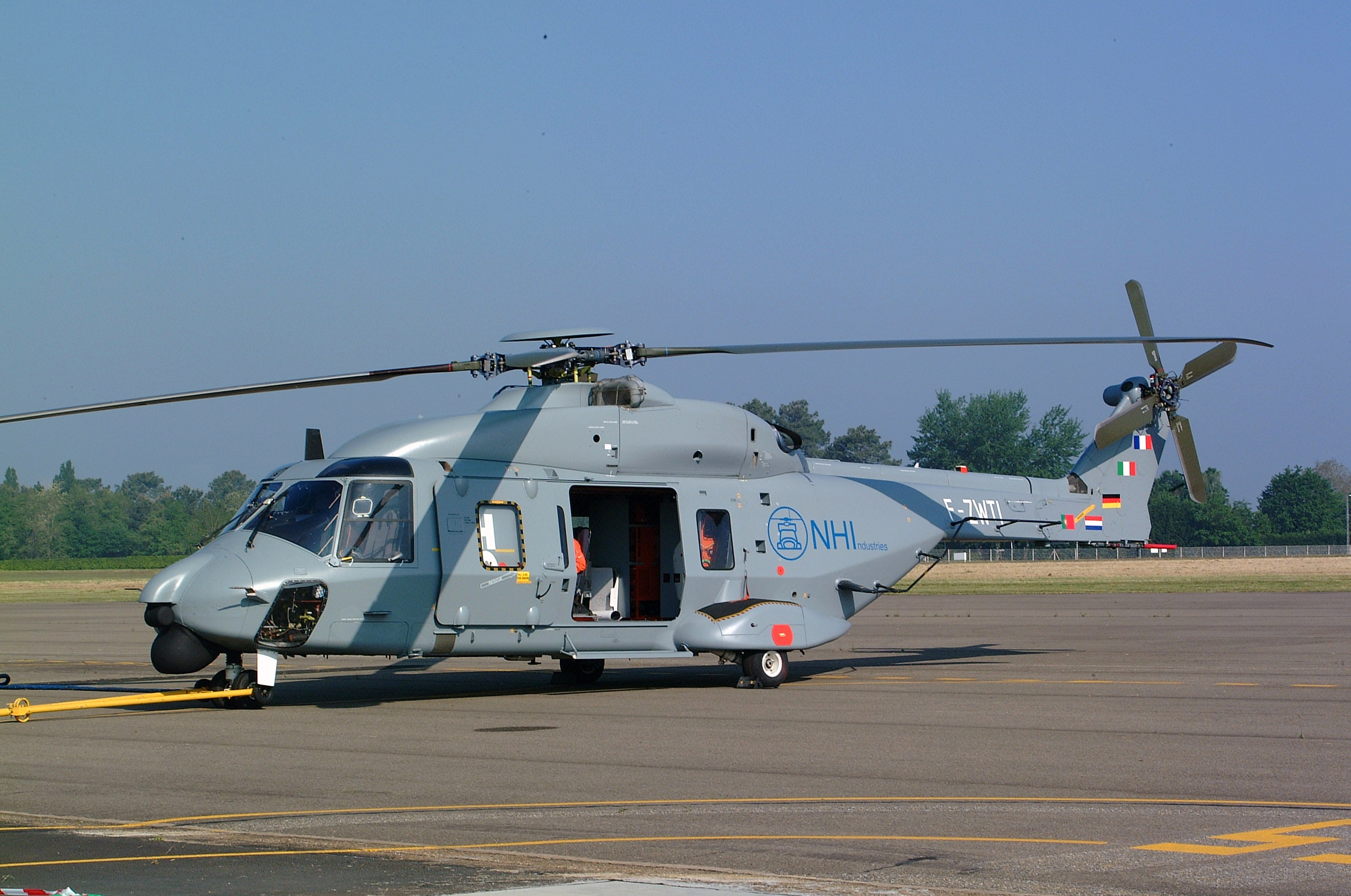
A prototype NHIndustries NH90

During the late 1990s the Air Force started considering replacing its fleet of helicopters. One aspect it considered was to buy a unified fleet, thus replacing the Lynx, the Westland Sea King search and rescue and the Bell 412 transport helicopters with one model. Norway took initiative in 1998 to establish the Nordic Standard Helicopter Program (NSHP), which would see a common unified model for the three Nordic countries. Four helicopters were considered: the AgustaWestland AW101, the NHIndustries NH90, the Eurocopter AS532 Cougar and the Sikorsky S-92. Norway initially considered placing an original order for eight Coast Guard helicopters and six for the then under planning Fridtjof Nansen-class frigates. Options would be places for a future ten SAR helicopters and fifteen troop transporters.

Denmark and Sweden withdrew from NSHP and in September 2001 the Norwegian Armed Forces bought fourteen NH90 units. Eight of the helicopters will service with the Coast Guard and be allocated to the 337 Squadron. The rest will serve on the frigates and be allocated to the 334 Squadron. To utilize the new helicopters, four new helicopter-carrying vessels were ordered. Svalbard was commissioned in 2002 as the first icebreaking vessel of the Coast Guard. The Barentshav-class consists of three vessels which were delivered from 2009 onwards.

The contract stipulated that delivery of the NH90 would commence in 2005. However, delays in production caused the first unit to not be delivered before 2011. Norway is the first country to take into use the navalized NATO Frigate Helicopter (NFH) variant. The 337 Squadron aims to have the NH90 operational by 1 May 2015. Only nine units were delivered of the initially ordered 14 pieces and non of them are in use as planned in early 2019.

In June 2022 the Norwegian Minister of Defence announced the Norwegian Defence Material Agency was given the task to terminate the NH90 contract due to NHI not meeting contractual obligations, and announced that the NH90 is taken out of operation with immediate effect.

=== Seahawk ===
The Norwegian government announced on 14 March 2023 that they would be purchasing six MH-60R Seahawk-helicopters with ASW-capabilities to replace the eight NH90s that were intended to serve the Coast Guard. The first three units are scheduled to be delivered in the latter half of 2025, with the rest being delivered by 2027. The NOK 12 billion (€1.1 billion) has yet to be approved by parliament, and doesn't include helicopters for 334 Squadron. As Eskadrille 723 of the Royal Danish Air Force has operated the same model since 2016, the 337 Squadron are planning to attend exercises in Denmark in preparation of the 2025 delivery.

== Operations ==
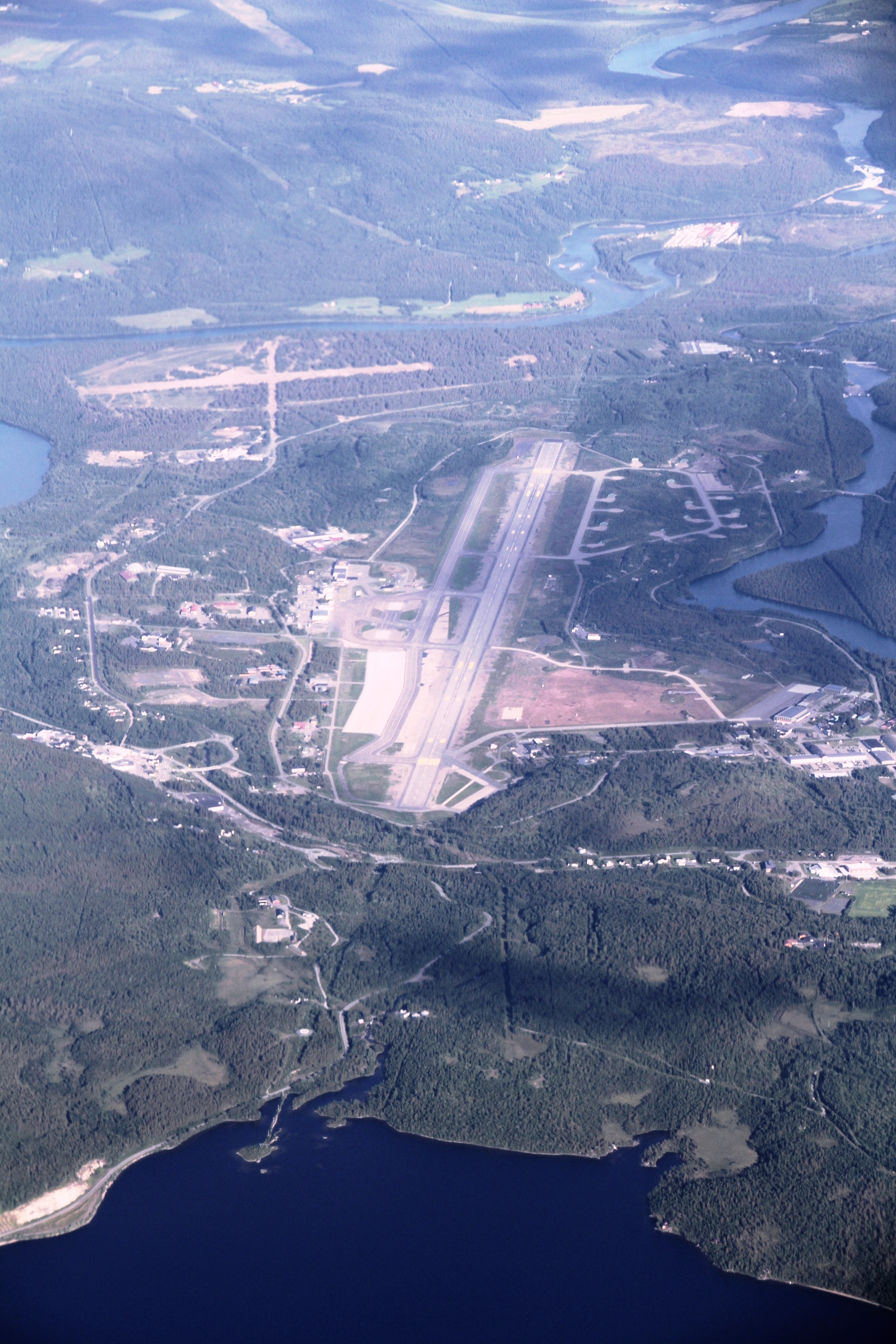
The 337 Squadron is based at Bardufoss Air Station

The 337 Squadron operated eight NHIndustries NH90 naval helicopters. They are 19.5 meters (64 ft) long, have a cruising speed of 259 km/h (161 mph) and have a range of 1,000 kilometers (620 mi). The squadron is based at Bardufoss Air Station. The squadron's helicopters are exclusively used by the Norwegian Coast Guard. The squadron therefore maintains and operates the helicopters, while they are under command of the navy in terms of operative power.

The helicopters can be used on board seven coast guard vessels, the three Nordkapp-class ships, the three Barentshav-class ships and Svalbard. They are used to extend the mobility and efficiency of the vessel's operation. At any given time at least two Coast Guard vessels have a Lynx on board, which remain on two-week cycles. They are predominantly used to patrol the coast off Troms, Finnmark and the Barents Sea, including the seas off Svalbard.

The Coast Guard's main task is to assert and uphold Norwegian sovereignty over its inland waters, territorial waters and exclusive economic zone (EEZ). Its structure is centred around a peace-time role, and is part of the Royal Norwegian Navy. The helicopters thereby assist in roles relating inspection and assistance of the fishing fleet, removing foreign objects at sea, and search and rescue missions.

== Bibliography ==
- Arheim, Tom; Hafsten, Bjørn; Olsen, Bjørn; Thuve, Sverre (1994). Fra Spitfire til F-16: Luftforsvaret 50 år 1944–1994 (in Norwegian). Oslo: Sem & Stenersen. ISBN 82-7046-068-0.
- Duvsete, Svein (2004). Kalde krigere og barmhjertige samartaner (in Norwegian). Oslo: Aschehoug. ISBN 82-03-22071-1.
- Jensen, Jan P. (1998). Havets voktere – historien om Kystvakten (in Norwegian). Oslo: Schibsted. ISBN 82-516-1679-4.
- Ministry of Justice and the Police. The Norwegian Search and Rescue Service. p. 13. Archived from the original on 24 September 2015.
- Mo, Sverre; Sælensminde, Ole Bjørn (2013). Norske militærfly (in Norwegian). Bergen: Bodoni Forlag. ISBN 978-82-7128-687-3.
- Terjesen, Bjørn; Kristiansen, Tom; Gjelsten, Rune (2010). Sjøforsvaret i krig og fred (in Norwegian). Bergen: Fagbokforlaget. ISBN 978-82-450-1014-5.
