= Truls Wickholm =

Norwegian politician

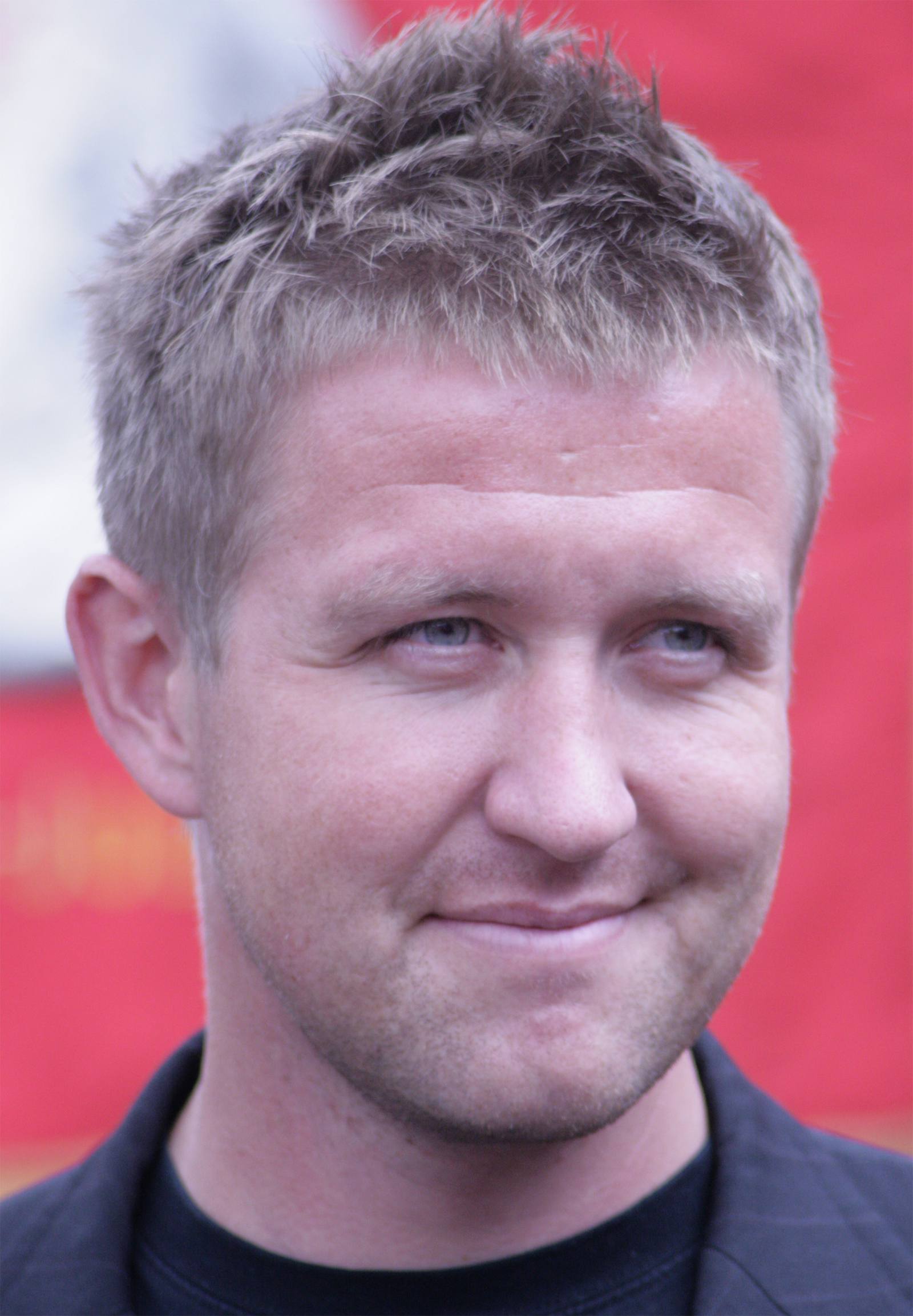
- Wickholm in 2009

State Secretary to the Minister of Labour and Social Inclusion
- In office 14 October 2021 – 4 March 2022
- Prime Minister: Jonas Gahr Støre
- Minister: Hadia Tajik

Mayor of Nesodden
- In office 18 October 2017 – 3 November 2021
- Deputy: Erik Adland; Eivind Hoff-Elimari
- Preceded by: Nina Sandberg
- Succeeded by: Cathrine Kjenner Forsland

Deputy Member of the Storting
- In office 1 October 2005 – 30 September 2017
- Deputising for: Jens Stoltenberg (2005–2009, 2013 and 2014); Jonas Gahr Støre (2009–2013)
- Constituency: Oslo

Personal details
- Born: 15 October 1978 (age 47) Oslo, Norway
- Party: Labour
- Spouse: Edina Ringdal (m. 2019)

Truls Aronsen Wickholm (born 15 October 1978) is a Norwegian politician for the Labour Party. He served as a deputy member of parliament for Oslo between 2005 and 2017 and later served as mayor of Nesodden between 2017 and 2021, when he became state secretary to minister of labour and social inclusion Hadia Tajik, a position he held until March 2022.

== Political career ==
=== Parliament ===
He served as a deputy representative to the Storting from Oslo between 2005 and 2017. He deputised for prime minister Jens Stoltenberg between 2005 and 2009, and then for foreign minister and later health minister Jonas Gahr Støre between 2009 and 2013. He deputised for Stoltenberg in October 2013 until the Stoltenberg's Second Cabinet left office. He did so again between June and September 2014 when Stoltenberg became Secretary-General of NATO.

During his time in parliament, Wickholm sat on the Standing Committee on Transport and Communications between 2005 and 2009. He then joined the Standing Committee on Education, Research and Church Affairs between 2009 and 2013. He also sat on the Standing Committee on Finance and Economic Affairs between June and September 2014.

=== Local politics ===
In local politics, he became mayor of Nesodden in 2017 following Nina Sandberg's resignation to take her seat in parliament. He was elected to a term in his own right following the 2019 local elections. He resigned in 2021 when he was appointed state secretary to labour and social inclusion minister Hadia Tajik. He was succeeded by Cathrine Kjenner Forsland.

== Civic career ==
Following Tajik's resignation, Wickholm joined the PR company Zynk as a senior advisor in May 2022. He later left Zynk and became director of energy at Samfunnsbedriftene in January 2023.

== Personal life ==
He is the son of Kåre Wickholm and Bente Aronsen, an administrative leader and senior advisor respectively. He married Edina Ringdal in June 2019.
