= Shouldn't Have to Be Like That =

Single by Fra Lippo Lippi

from the album Songs
- A-side: "The Distance Between Us"
- B-side: "Say Something" "Shouldn't Have to Be Like That" (original version)
- Released: 1986
- Recorded: 1985
- Genre: New wave
- Length: 3:33
- Label: Virgin Records
- Songwriter(s): Rune Kristoffersen, Øyvind Kvalnes
- Producer(s): Dave Allen

"Shouldn't Have to Be Like That" is a song by Norwegian new wave band Fra Lippo Lippi, first released in 1985 on their third studio album Songs, on the band's own label, Easter Productions. The song was remixed for the 1986 international reissue of the album on Virgin Records. It was released in 1986 as a double A-side single with "The Distance Between Us". The single charted in several countries across Europe, including their homeland of Norway where it was most successful, peaking at No. 4.

== Background ==
The song was written by keyboardist Øyvind Kvalnes and Rune Kristoffersen. Kvalnes composed the basic piano melody, Kristoffersen added the lyrics and the vocal melody. Originally released on their 1985 album Songs, the song was re-worked with producer Dave Allen for the 1986 Virgin Records release of the album and released as a single.

== Location ==
The music video was filmed at Chiswick House Gardens in London.

== Charts ==
Chart (1986)	Peak position
Norway (VG-lista)	4
Belgium (Ultratop)	39
Netherlands (Single Top 100)	29
UK Singles Chart	81

== Other versions ==
In 2005, "Shouldn't Have to Be Like That" was remixed and released by Molella under the title "Lost Love".
