= Ulf Kristiansen =

Norwegian painter and video-artist (born 1969)

Ulf Kristiansen (born March 31, 1969) is a Norwegian painter and video-artist. He is currently living at Nesodden, Norway. While starting out as a figurative artist, Kristiansen is now mainly focusing on 3d animation and machinima.

== Filmography ==
- The Art Reception (2006), 11 min, machinima animation
- The Doctrine of Hell (2006), 20 min, machinima animation
- What I learned in 2006 (2007), 3 min, machinima animation
- Mechanic mix (2007), music video (Selfish Cunt)
- Tamin Sah Pade (2007), music video (Fiona Soe Paing)
- She Burns (2008), music video (Ashley Reaks)
- The Abyss (2008), 8 min, machinima animation, animation and "found footage"
- My Little Ponygirl (2009), 3d animation, "found footage"
- The Tiger and the Lamb (2009), 3d animation

== Sources ==
- Hd fest, Los Angeles
- AFH Gallery, Los Angeles
- Dagsavisen
- Aftenposten
- Dagbladet
