= Light and Shade (Fra Lippo Lippi album) =

Studio album by Fra Lippo Lippi
- Released: 15 September 1987
- Label: Virgin Records
- Producer: Walter Becker

Fra Lippo Lippi chronology
Songs (1985)	Light and Shade (1987)	The Colour Album (1989)

Singles from Light and Shade
- 1. "Angel" Released: 1987; 2. "Some People" Released: 1987; 3. "Light and Shade" Released: 1987 (Philippine release only)

Light and Shade is the fourth studio album by Norwegian new wave band Fra Lippo Lippi.

It was recorded in Los Angeles, California and produced by Walter Becker of Steely Dan fame. The recording was said to cost 1 million kr. The music was chiefly recorded by studio musicians, on the request of Becker. Talking to Morgenbladet, the group said: "We are not that stupid as to say 'Sorry, if we can't play, the deal is off'. We took a pretty pragmatic stance towards the recording as such. Why should Rune spend an entire day doing a bass line that could be done by someone else in less than two others? We were the bank of ideas, our music was being recorded and we were in full control all the way". They aimed for a total sale of 300,000–400,000 albums.

Following the success of the 1985 album Songs, Virgin Records had the band work on a follow-up album with the United States as its intended target market. The first single, "Angel" received moderate airplay on a radio station in Los Angeles. However, during this time, the US arm of Virgin Records dropped several artists off their roster – Fra Lippo Lippi being one of them. Frustrated by the album's failure to capture the US market, the band parted ways with Virgin Records in 1988.

== Reception ==
Aftenposten called Light and Shade "one of the best records by Norwegian performers I have ever heard". Several songs were classics. The album also received positive reviews with 4 stars in Bergens Arbeiderblad and Tønsbergs Blad, and elsewhere in Stavanger Aftenblad, Fædrelandsvennen and Fredriksstad Blad.

According to Bergens Tidende, it was "good pop", but "boring". The band would "thoroughly fall through with his product". Adresseavisen found the band "more boring than on Songs".

Nordlandsposten gave 2 1/2 stars, asking if this was "the disappointment of the year?" and with "not a single hit song". Østlendingen only gave 2 stars, calling the music "bottom of the barrel".

In the Norwegian music press, Kjetil Rolness called the album "a blurred-out copy of American mainstream music", with "too weak tunes". Eirik Mosveen of Beat characterized the album as "almost unbelieveably boring", with a passive and limp soundscape, "anonymous" songwriting and the vocals being a "monotonous, lifeless manifestation of nothing". Arvid Skancke-Knutsen of Puls magazine stated that "Light and Shade' is lost in a no-man's land of toothlessness". The songwriting, arrangements, musicianship, lyrics and vocals were all "indifferent".

== Charts and awards ==
On the Norwegian VG-lista, the album charted for three weeks and peaked at number 15.

The album was nominated for "pop album of the year" during the 1987 Spellemann Award, but lost out to Tomboy's Back to the Beat.

== Track listing ==
1. "Angel"
2. "Freedom"
3. "Don't Take Away That Light"
4. "Beauty and Madness"
5. "Home"
6. "Light and Shade"
7. "Some People"
8. "Crazy Wisdom"
9. "Stardust Motel"
10. "Indifference"

== Personnel ==
- Rune Kristoffersen – bass
- Per Øystein Sørensen – vocals, keyboards
- Walter Becker – guitar
- Tim Weston – guitar
- Dean Parks – guitar
- Mark Morgan – keyboards
- Robbie Buchanan – keyboards
- Mark Isham – trumpet
- Tom Scott – saxophone
- Jimmy Haslip – bass
- Jimmy Johnson – bass
- Abraham Laboriel – bass
- Leroy Clouden – drums
- Claude Pepper – drums
- Jeff Porcaro – drums
- Carlos Vega – drums
- Paulinho da Costa – percussion
