= Fagerstrand =

Coordinates: 59°44′0″N 10°36′0″E

- Village
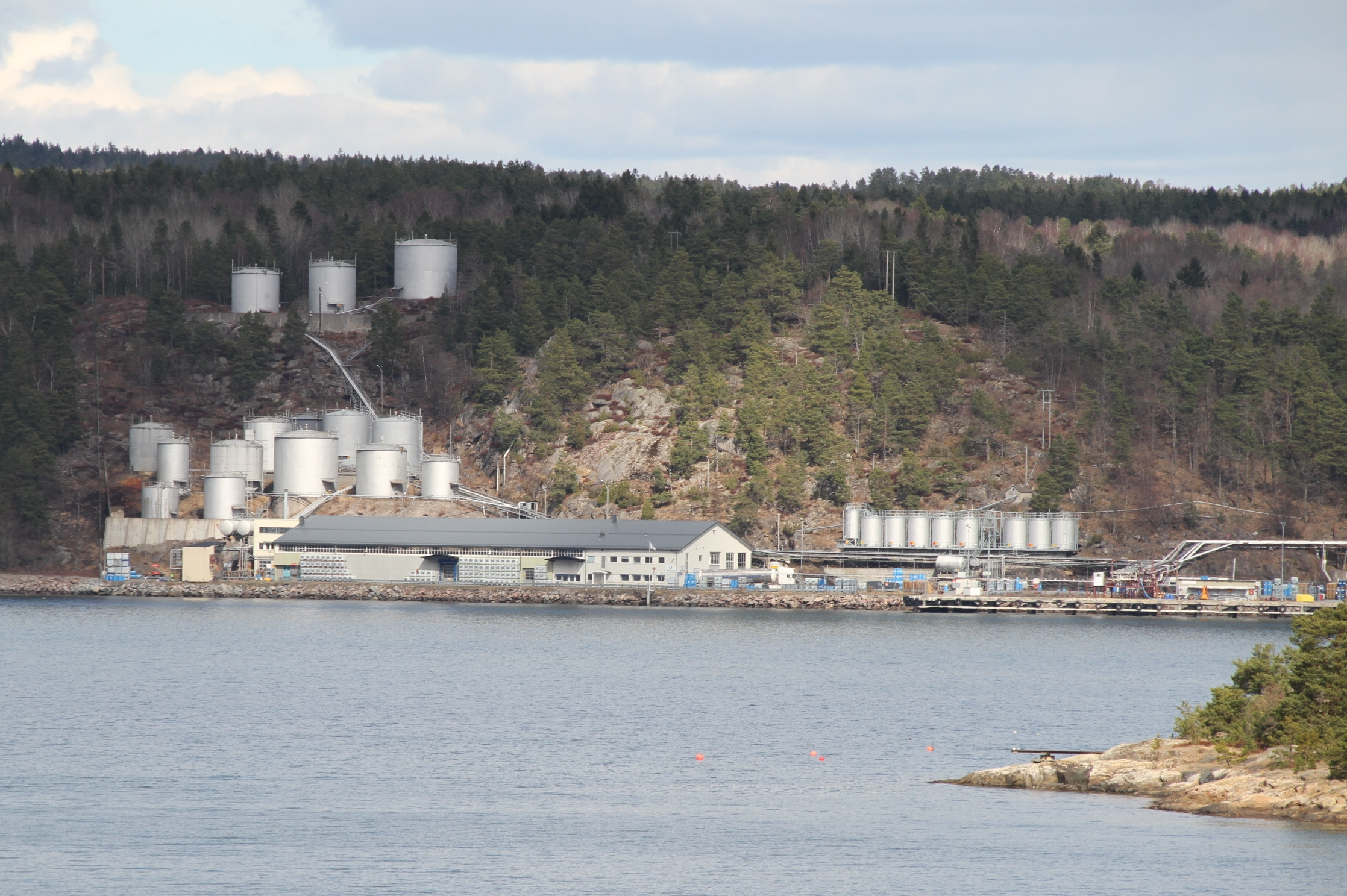

- Location in Akershus
- Country: Norway
- Region: Østlandet
- County: Akershus
- Time zone: UTC+01:00 (CET)
  - Summer (DST): UTC+02:00 (CEST)

Fagerstrand is a village in the municipality of Nesodden, in the county of Akershus, in the country of Norway. It is south of Oslo on the peninsula of Nesodden. Fagerstrand has 1977 inhabitants (2006) making it the second largest village on Nesodden. "Fagerstrand" in English means "beautiful beach" or "fair beach".

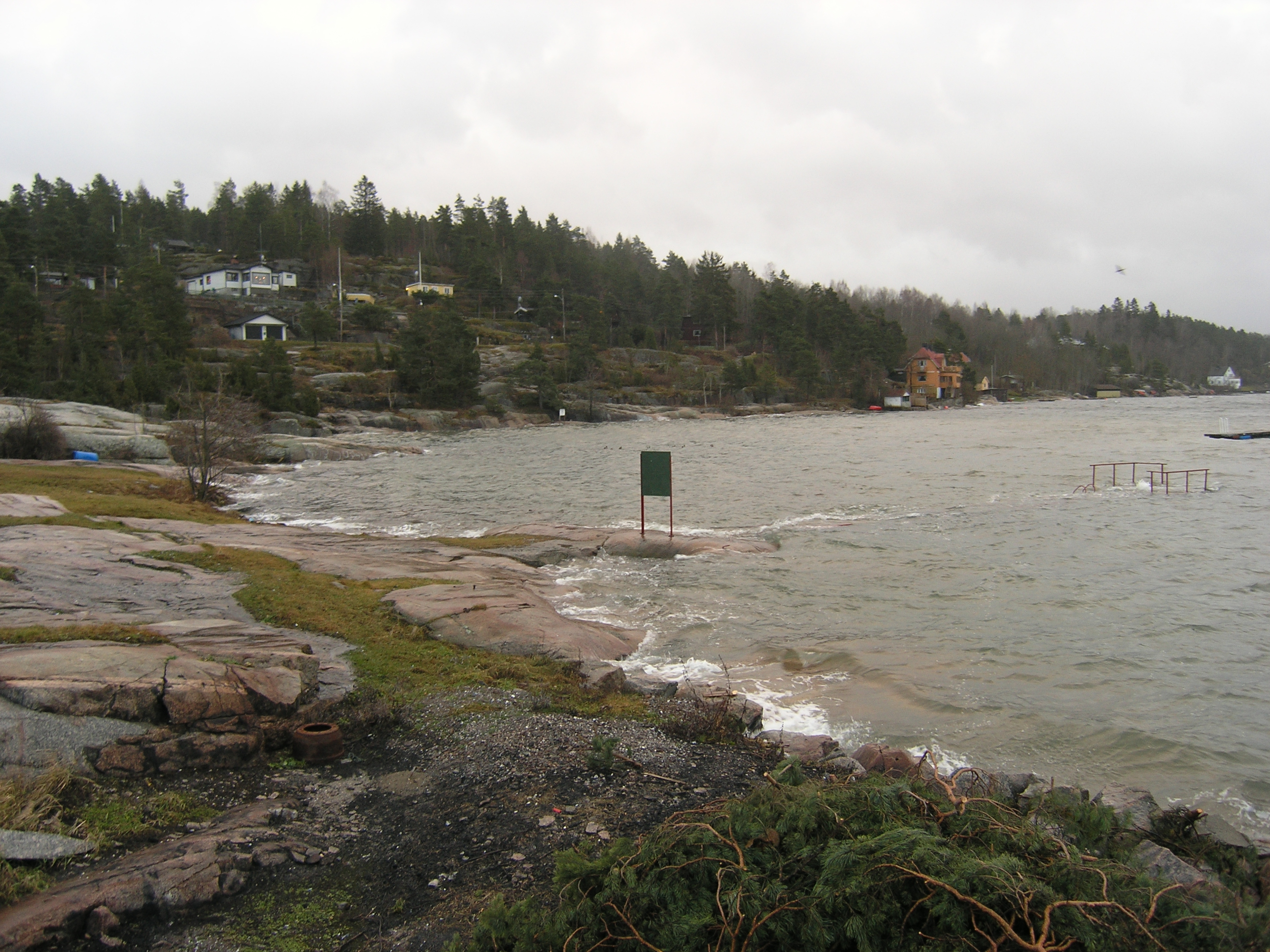

Fagerstrand is a small village with two grocery stores, two hair salons and one bar. There are two schools in Fagerstrand: Myklerud skole (elementary school) and Bakkeløkka ungdomsskole (junior high school).

Fagerstrand is also the name of a reality show that was shot in Fagerstrand and aired on TV 2 during the first half of 2005. In the show, 12 couples built a house together. The couples voted each other out of the show until only two couples were left. Then the viewers would then decide who got the house valued at 3,000,000 NOK (ca. $500,000).

Fagerstrand is also a very small area in the district of Høvik, which is a part of the municipal Bærum, across the fjord from Nesodden. This area sports a soccer field and a restaurant.
