= Christian Hintze Holm =

Norwegian politician (born 1964)

Christian Hintze Holm (born 8 December 1964) is a Norwegian politician for the Socialist Left Party.

He served as a deputy representative to the Norwegian Parliament from Akershus during the term 2001–2005.

On the local level Holm is the mayor of Nesodden since 2003.
