= Nesoddtangen =

Coordinates: 59°52′N 10°39′E

- Village
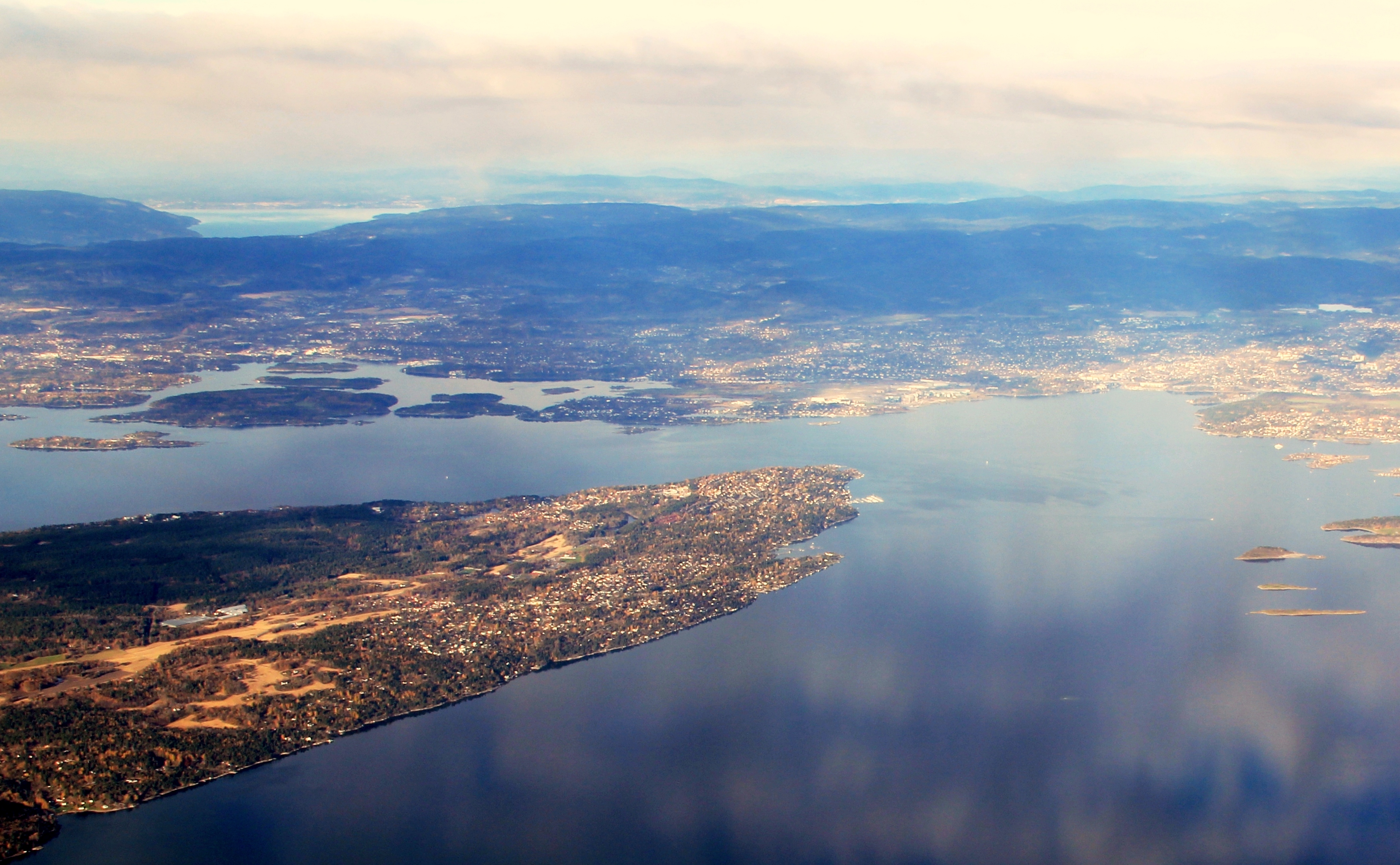
- Indre Oslofjord and Bunnefjorden from Nesodden
- Interactive map of Nesoddtangen
- Country: Norway
- Region: Østlandet
- County: Akershus
- District: Follo
- Municipality: Nesodden

Population (2017)
  - Total: 12,803
- Time zone: UTC+01:00 (CET)
  - Summer (DST): UTC+02:00 (CEST)

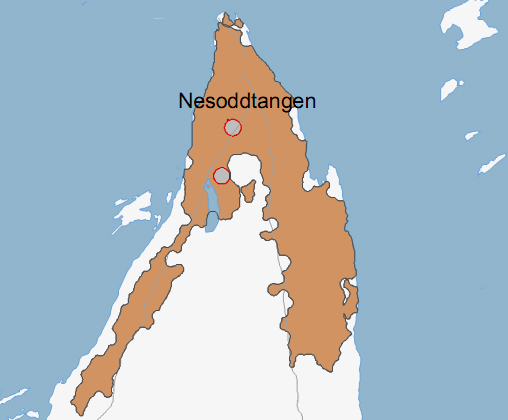
Urban area of Nesodden (2005)

Nesoddtangen is a village and the administrative centre of the municipality of Nesodden in Akershus, Norway.

Nesoddtangen is located on the tip of the peninsula between the inner Oslofjord (Indre Oslofjord) and its arm Bunnefjorden. It is situated 4 miles (7 kilometers) southwest of Oslo. It had 13,150 residents in 2021; about two thirds of the municipality's population. Of the working population in Nesoddtangen, more than 90% work in Oslo. Passenger ferries are the most used commuting transportation.

The name Nesoddtangen is a triple tautology, consisting of three parts, nes, odd and tangen, all being synonyms signifying a small cape or promontory. Notable spots of attraction include Sjøbadet, Nesodden Cultural Centre, Bygdo Church, Gåserud Nature Reserve and Nesodden Beach.
