= Songs (Fra Lippo Lippi album) =

Studio album by Fra Lippo Lippi
- Released: 1985; 1986 (Virgin Records release)
- Genre: New wave
- Label: Easter Productions; Virgin; Rune Arkiv
- Producer: Kaj Erixon; David M. Allen

Fra Lippo Lippi chronology
Small Mercies (1983)	Songs (1985)	Light and Shade (1987)

Singles from Songs
- 1. "Shouldn't Have to Be Like That" / "The Distance Between Us" Released: 1986; 2. "Come Summer" Released: 1986; 3. "Every Time I See You" Released: 1986

Songs is the third studio album by Norwegian new wave band Fra Lippo Lippi. Originally released in 1985 by the band's own label, Easter Productions, Songs received favorable reviews and sold around 5,000 copies without any means of promotion. It is the only album of the Fra Lippo Lippi as a quartet.

Later that year, Virgin Records signed the band to a worldwide contract. The album was reissued and released internationally in 1986 with some songs re-recorded or remixed and the addition of the song "Everytime I See You". "Shouldn't Have to Be Like That"/"The Distance Between Us", "Come Summer" and "Everytime I See You" were released as singles in Europe. "Everytime I See You" and "The Distance Between Us" became popular hits in the Philippines. This version of the album also sold 20,000 copies in Norway.

The sleeve photography by Reinhard Wolf shows the medieval alcazar of Molina de Aragon in Spain.

Positive response from critics and sales performance of Songs prompted Virgin Records to have the band work on a follow-up album. Unfortunately, by the time Light and Shade was released in 1987, Virgin Records had dropped the band.

In 2005, the album was reissued by band founder Rune Kristoffersen's label Rune Arkiv. It features the original 1985 Easter Productions recordings (as the 1986 release is still the property of Virgin Records) plus the live album Crash of Light, which was previously released only in the Philippines.

== Track listings ==
=== 1985 original Easter Productions release ===
1. "Come Summer"
2. "Shouldn't Have to Be Like That"
3. "Even Tall Trees Bend"
4. "Just Like Me"
5. "Crash of Light"
6. "The Distance Between Us"
7. "Regrets"
8. "Leaving"
9. "Coming Home"

=== 1986 Virgin Records release ===
1. "Come Summer"
2. "Shouldn't Have to Be Like That"
3. "Even Tall Trees Bend"
4. "Just Like Me"
5. "Leaving"
6. "Regrets"
7. "Everytime I See You"
8. "Crash of Light"
9. "The Distance Between Us"
10. "Coming Home"

=== 2005 Rune Arkiv reissue ===
1. "Come Summer"
2. "Shouldn't Have to Be Like That"
3. "Even Tall Trees Bend"
4. "Just Like Me"
5. "Leaving"
6. "Regrets"
7. "Crash of Light"
8. "The Distance Between Us"
9. "Coming Home"
10. "Crash of Light" (Live)
11. "The Distance Between Us" (Live)
12. "Everytime I See You" (Live)
13. "Fade Away" (Live)
14. "Shouldn't Have to Be Like That" (Live)
15. "Even Tall Trees Bend" (Live)
16. "Say Something" (Live)
17. "Regrets" (Live)

== Personnel ==
- Rune Kristoffersen - bass, keyboards
- Per Øystein Sørensen - vocals, keyboards
- Morten Sjøberg - additional keyboards
- Øyvind Kvalnes - additional keyboards

with

- Henrik Janson - guitar (Virgin Records release)
- Erik Häusler - saxophone (Virgin Records release)
- Åke Sundquist - percussion (Virgin Records release)
- Tore Elgarøy - guitar, backing vocals (Rune Arkiv reissue - live tracks)
- Lasse Hafreager - keyboards, backing vocals (Rune Arkiv reissue - live tracks)
- Berit Lohne - piano, backing vocals (Rune Arkiv reissue - live tracks)
- Bjørn Juliusson - drums & percussion (Rune Arkiv reissue - live tracks)

== Charts ==
Chart (1985)	Peak position
Norwegian Albums (VG-lista)	13
