= Bardufoss Air Station =

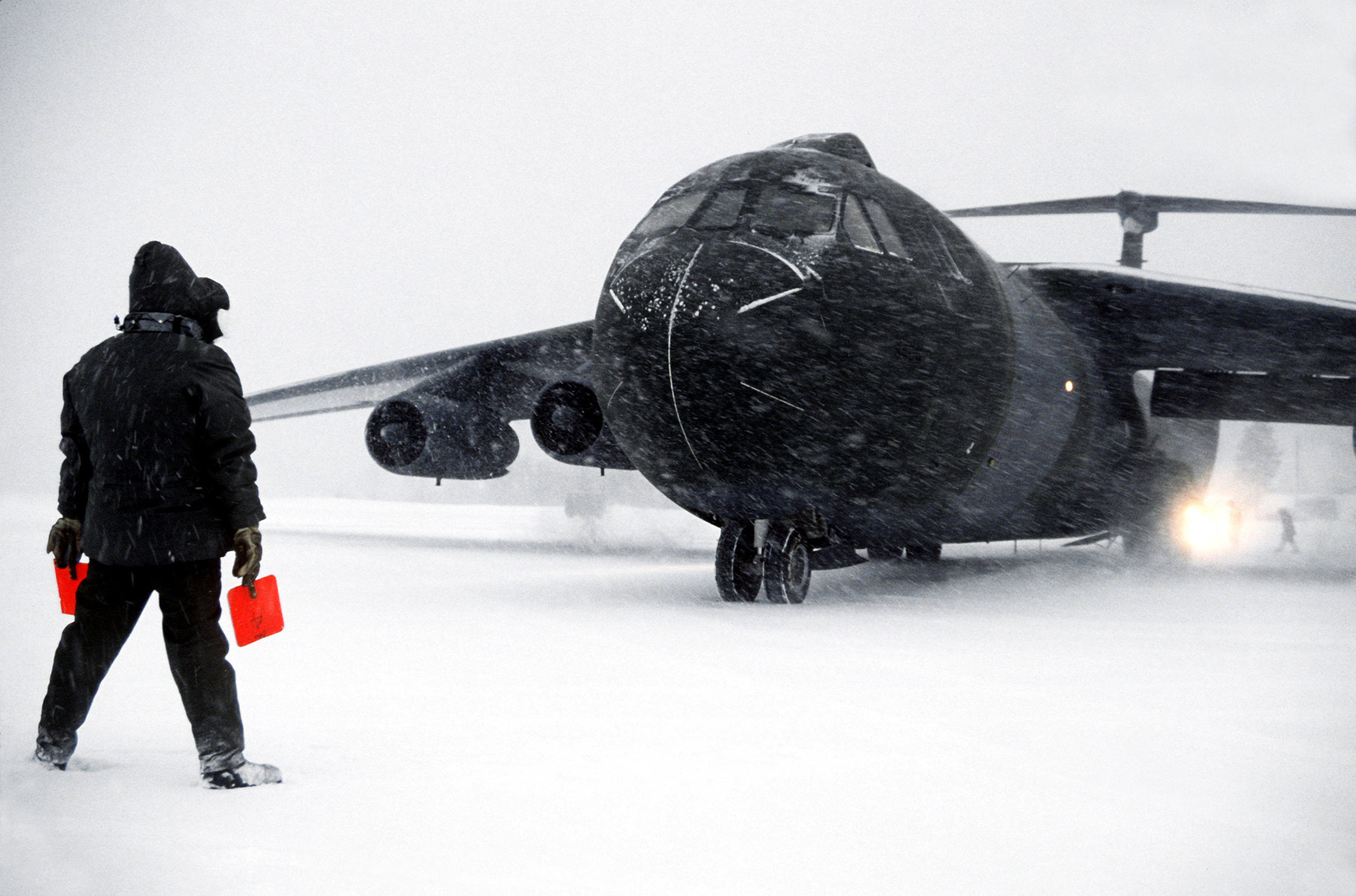
- A flight line marshaler directs a C-141B during exercise Alloy Express, 1982.
- IATA: BDU; ICAO: ENDU

Summary
- Airport type: Military/Public
- Operator: Royal Air Force; Royal Norwegian Air Force
- Serves: Senja, Sørreisa, Bardu, and Målselv, Norway
- Location: Bardufoss
- Elevation AMSL: 252 ft / 77 m
- Coordinates: 69°03′22″N 018°32′25″E
- Website: www.avinor.no/Norsk/Lufthavner/Bardufoss_lufthavn/

Map
- Location in Norway

Runways
Direction	Length		Surface
Direction	m	ft	Surface
10/28	2,443	8,015	Asphalt

Bardufoss Air Station (IATA: BDU, ICAO: ENDU) (Norwegian: Bardufoss flystasjon) is a military air station located at Bardufoss in Målselv Municipality in Troms county in Northern Norway. It is the location of the Royal Norwegian Air Force (RNoAF) 139 Air Wing and two helicopter squadrons; the 337 Squadron that operated Lynx MK 86 for the Norwegian Coast Guard, the 334 Squadron that operated NHIndustries NH90 and the 339 Squadron equipped with Bell 412SPs. It is also the base for the RNoAF Flight Training School.

Both the 337 Squadron and the 334 Squadron are not operating helicopters due to major problems with the phasing-in of NH90. It was decided to terminate the contract for the purchase of the helicopters in June 2022. The 337 Squadron will be equipped with MH60-Seahawk that are planned to be delivered between 2026–2027.

The air station is co-located on the same site as the commercial Bardufoss Airport. The airbase is also used by the civilian community: Norwegian Aviation College (NAC) is located at the airport, and there is also a flying club (Bardufoss Flyklubb) and a parachute jumping club. Norwegian Air Shuttle currently operates three daily flights with Boeing 737 aircraft from Bardufoss Airport to Oslo Airport, Gardermoen.

== History ==
The first plane to land at the air station was a de Havilland Tiger Moth on 26 March 1938, making it the country's oldest air station still operational. During World War II, RAF Gloster Gladiators (No. 263 Squadron RAF) and Hawker Hurricanes (No. 46 Squadron RAF) operating from Bardufoss played a vital part in keeping the Luftwaffe at bay during the fighting on the Narvik front in the April–June 1940 Norwegian Campaign. After the Allied withdrawal from Norway, the airbase was taken over by the Germans and mostly used as a base for fighters, bombers and reconnaissance planes operating against the Murmansk convoys. Fighters from Bardufoss also had the task of providing aerial support for naval operations in the area.

When British Avro Lancasters began to bomb the battleship Tirpitz on 12 November 1944 in Operation Catechism at Håkøya near Tromsø, calls to Bardufoss failed to save the ship. The fighters failed to scramble in time and Tirpitz was sunk in ten minutes by two Tallboy bombs. Luftwaffe ace Heinrich Ehrler was originally stripped of command and sentenced to three years in prison because of this. He later died in combat when he rammed an American B-17 Flying Fortress over Germany.

The 339 Squadron was moved to Bardufoss in 1964 while the 337 Squadron arrived in 1983.

The Royal Norwegian Air Force Flight Training School was moved to Bardufoss from Trondheim Airport, Værnes in 2003.

2024: The Air Force uses the Underground hangar at the air station, after 40 years, to receive F-35 fighter jets.

== Squadrons ==
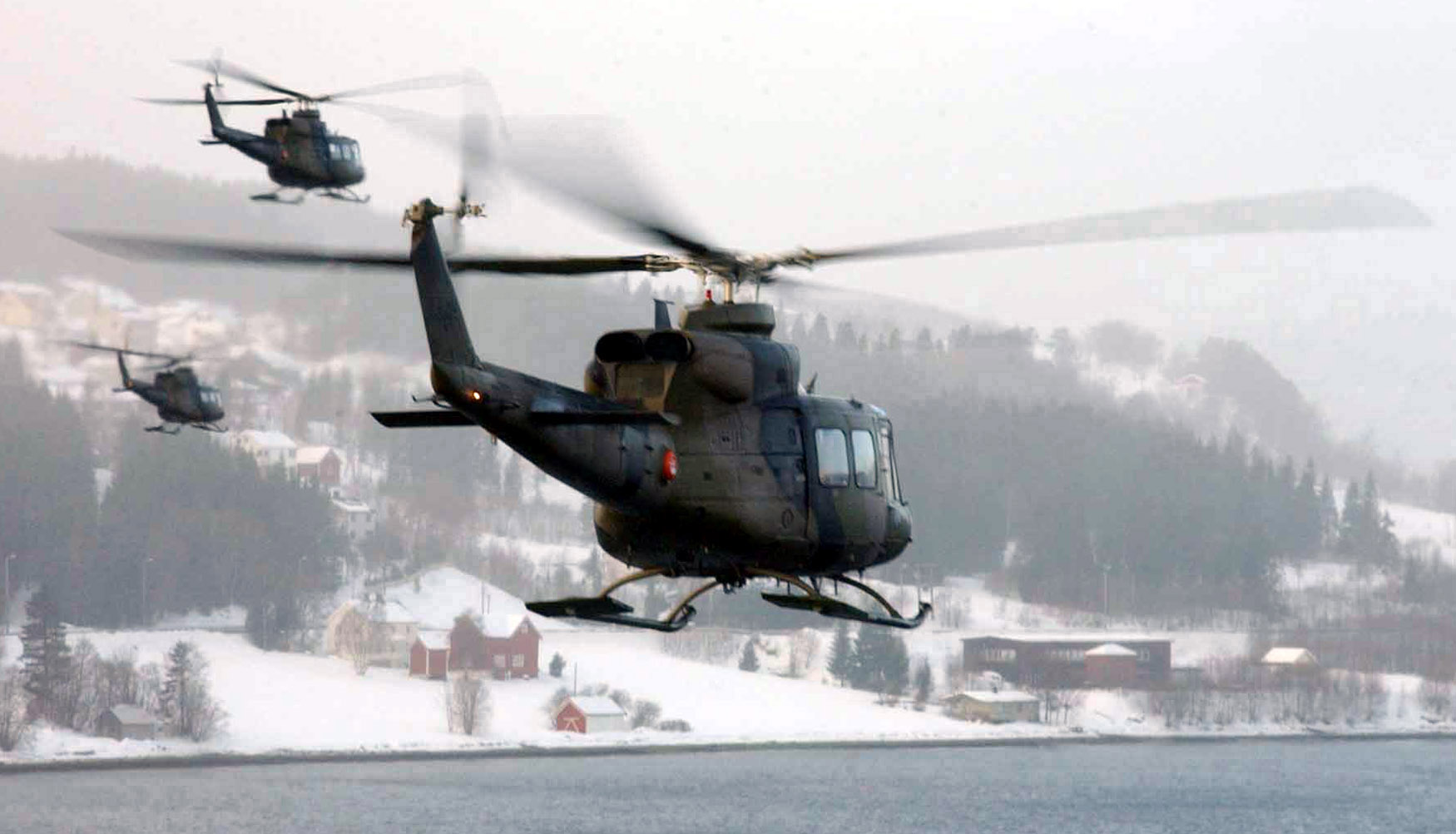
339 Squadron Bell 412 helicopters taking part in the NATO exercise Strong Resolve 2002

Three helicopter squadrons are stationed on this airfield: 337 and 334 that operated NH90 and 339 with Bell 412SP (since 1964).

The 337 Squadron operated six Lynx MK 86 helicopters, which were delivered in 1983. Their purpose is to operate onboard Coast Guard ships. They were replaced by NH-90s from 2012 but the contract was terminated by the Norwegian government in 2022 due to major problems with its phasing-in.

The 339 Squadron operates twelve Bell 412SP, primarily used as support for the Royal Norwegian Army. The Bells were delivered in between 1987 and 1990. Previous to their delivery, the squadron operated UH-1s bought used from the USA: some of those machines were received with minor battle damages and bullet holes, having seen action in the Vietnam War. The Royal Norwegian Air Force's six remaining Bells (making a total of 18) are stationed at the 720 Squadron at Rygge Air Station.

In addition, the RNoAF Flight Training School is located here. The school operates the Saab Safari.

UK Royal Naval Commando and Royal Marine units and the Dutch korps mariniers have used Bardufoss as a training base for many years. It is also used as a base for cold weather training for Royal Air Force, British Army and Royal Navy helicopter crews. During the Cold War, training was especially concentrated during the winter with repair parties during the Norwegian summer. These operations were given the title of "Clockwork".
