= In Silence (album) =

Studio album by Fra Lippo Lippi
- Released: 1981
- Genre: Post-punk, gothic rock
- Label: Uniton

Fra Lippo Lippi chronology
In Silence (1981)	Small Mercies (1983)

In Silence is the debut studio album by Norwegian band Fra Lippo Lippi. It was released in 1981 through record label Uniton. The album's gothic post-punk sound was heavily influenced by bands such as Joy Division and the Cure.

== Track listing ==
All tracks are written by Rune Kristoffersen, except "Recession", written by Kristoffersen and Morten Sjøberg.

Side A
No.	Title	Length
1.	"Out of the Ruins"	3:17
2.	"A Moment Like This"	3:34
3.	"In Silence"	4:37
4.	"Recession"	6:18

Side B
No.	Title	Length
1.	"The Inside Veil"	4:24
2.	"I Know"	4:27
3.	"Quiet"	3:34
4.	"Lost"	7:30

== Critical reception ==
In their retrospective review, AllMusic panned the album, calling it "arguably the only unlistenable LP in Fra Lippo Lippi's career. [...] Fra Lippo Lippi were still trying to find themselves on In Silence; the band sounds lost, unable to find a hook that wasn't borrowed from The Cure or Joy Division." In their review of The Early Years, a compilation album comprising In Silence and the group's second album Small Mercies, Tiny Mix Tapes called In Silence "the more interesting of the two" and the album "so strangely similar [to Joy Division] [it's] almost like having a new Joy Division/New Order album."

== Re-issue ==
In Silence, along with Small Mercies, was re-issued by Rune Arkiv in 2003 as the compilation album The Early Years.

== Personnel ==
Fra Lippo Lippi

- Rune Kristoffersen
- Morten Sjøberg

Technical

- Jesse A. Fernandez – sleeve photography
