= Lights and Shadows =

Lights and Shadows may refer to:

- Lights and Shadows (1914 film), a 1914 American silent drama film
- Lights and Shadows (1988 film), a 1988 Spanish fantasy film
- Lights and Shadows (TV series), a 2012 South Korean retro-drama series
- "Lights and Shadows" (song), a 2017 single by O'G3NE
