= Fjellstrand, Norway =

- Village
- Location in Akershus
- Coordinates: 59°48′N 10°37′E
- Country: Norway
- Region: Østlandet
- County: Akershus
- Municipality: Nesodden
- Time zone: UTC+01:00 (CET)
  - Summer (DST): UTC+02:00 (CEST)

Fjellstrand is a village in Nesodden municipality, Akershus, Norway. The population was 832 as at 2005.

A hairdresser and a grocery store can be found near the central bus stop of Fjellstrand. A relatively rocky beach at the ironically named Paradise Bay is one of the few tourist attractions in this area.

Fjellstrand reached its peak in the 1920s, when it was the biggest rural district on the Nesodden peninsula, and beloved as a cabin area for the wealthy white collar workers of western Oslo. Since then, the importance of this place has been steadily declining.

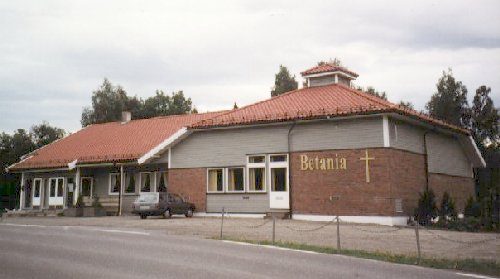
Betania, a place of worship for many locals

However, the Christian community and its house "Betania", centrally placed in this rural district, has gained some importance in the region. The place by some often referred to as the Bible Belt of eastern Norway. Dagfinn Høybråten, the leader of the Christian Democratic Party (KrF) has contributed to the establishment of this impression.

== Education ==
The village has an elementary school, Fjellstrand skole, which teaches grades one to seven. As of 2005 the school had about 143 students and eleven teachers. As is common with elementary schools in Norway, since 1998 the school runs an SFO, a day-care centre for school children.
