= Norwegian Aviation College =

Norwegian Aviation College was a flying school with its base at Bardufoss Air Station in Norway. SAS's most experienced airline pilots/instructors participated in selecting the location, designing the training facilities, selecting the equipment and in the design of the training programmes and the follow-up. This, coupled with a rigorous testing and selection of the applicants, had resulted in an ab-initio pilot training programme, unique in the aviation industry.

Norwegian Aviation College was supported financially by SAS, but around 2004 SAS wanted to cut the support. The University of Tromsø was planning to take over and make the college a part of the university thus making this educational course a government offer. The process took a lot of time, and since the last integrated course class graduated in September 2006, the college did not take in any new students per April 2007.

On May 20, 2008, the University of Tromsø announced that their flight training programme would be commencing during autumn 2008, with actual flight training starting spring 2009 in Tromsø. It is still unclear as to what part Norwegian Aviation College would have played in the new establishment, as the company formally ceased to exist at the end of 2007, and their aircraft and other assets sold.

== History ==
Norwegian Aviation College was started in 1992 by Scandinavian Airlines System and SAS Flight Academy.

The school had the following airplanes in their fleet:

- 2 Piper Seneca V
- 4 Piper Archer III
- 4 Grob 115D

NAC operated a fleet of civilian trainers, with the twin engine training being completed on the Piper Seneca V. In 1999, NAC completely renewed its fleet by replacing the Cessna and MFI-15 with 6 Piper Archer III's, 4 Grob 115D's and 2 Piper Seneca V. Later they reduced their fleet by two Piper Archer III.

== Location ==
Bardufoss is located in the beautiful nature of Målselv Municipality, in the inner part of Troms county. The municipality is characterized by wide valleys that cut in between tall mountains. At the floor of the majestic Målselvdalen valley, runs the 140 kilometres (87 mi) long river Målselva, a river renowned for its salmon and trout fishing. The Målselvfoss waterfall is located on the river between Andselv and Øverbygd. The waterfall is 600 metres (2,000 ft) long with a 15-metre (49 ft) drop. Along the waterfall, a 450-metre (1,480 ft) long salmon bridge is blasted out of the rock. The Øvre Dividal National Park is located in eastern Målselv. It is known for its ancient pine forest.

The area has several large military camps, and Bardufoss is an important air base of the Royal Norwegian Air Force, being the home of two helicopter squadrons. Different NATO allies perform their winter training here, and during January to March there is high activity at the airport and in the airspace around Bardufoss.
