= Nina Sandberg =

Norwegian politician (born 1967)

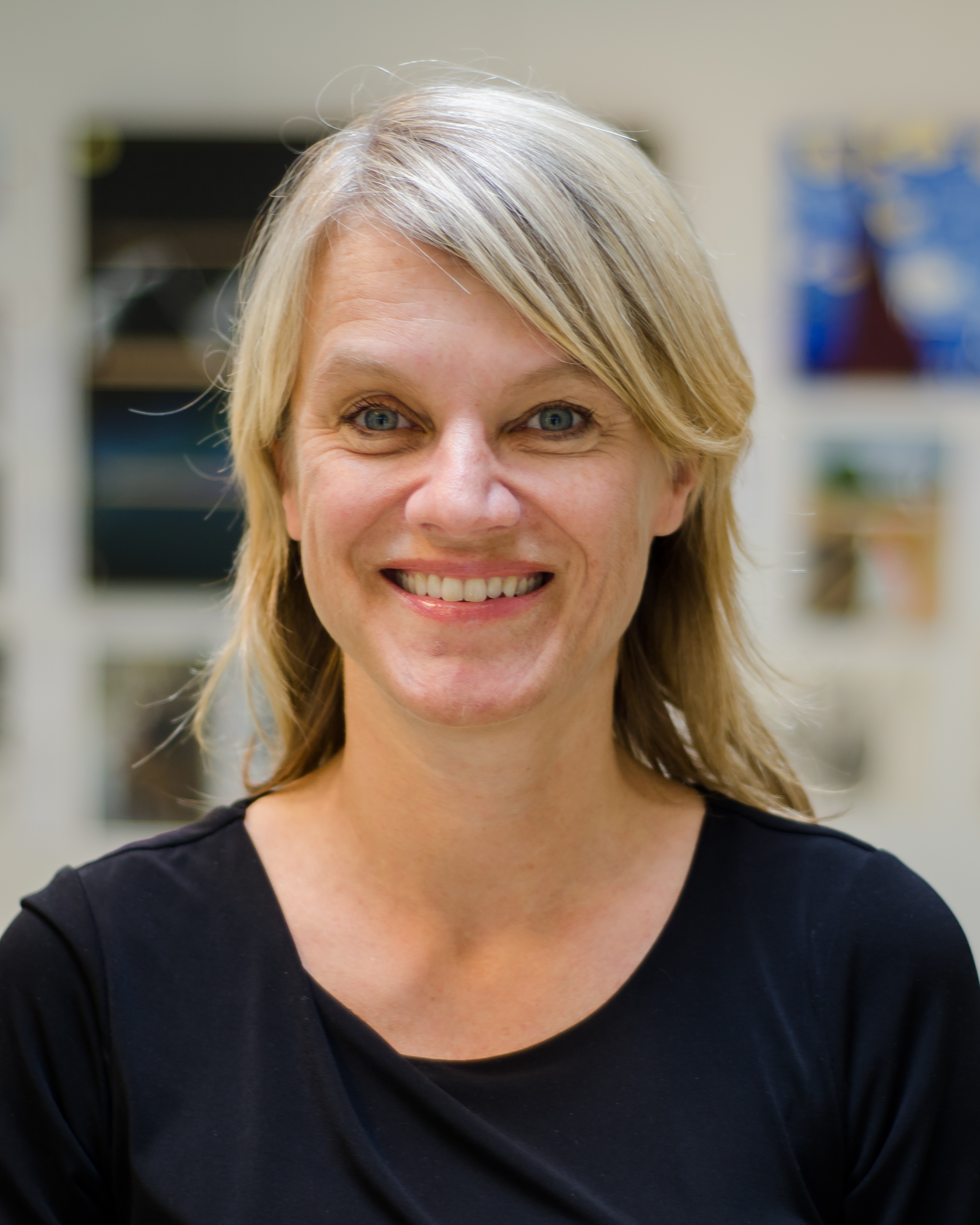
- Sandberg in 2017
- Born: 18 February 1967 (age 59)
- Occupation: Politician

Nina Sandberg (born 18 February 1967) is a Norwegian politician. She served as mayor of Nesodden from 2011 to 2017, and was elected representative to the Storting for the period 2017–2021 for the Labour Party.

== Career ==
Sandberg is a political scientist (cand.polit.) by education. From 1994 she was appointed at the research institute NIFU (Norsk institutt for studier av forskning og utdanning).
