= No. 334 Squadron RNoAF =

334 Squadron Royal Norwegian Air Force No. 334 (Norwegian) Squadron Royal Air Force
- Active: 26 May 1945 - 21 Nov 1945; 1945 - present
- Country: Norway; United Kingdom (1945)
- Allegiance: (Norway) Norwegian Government in exile (1945)
- Branch: Royal Norwegian Air Force; Royal Air Force (1945)
- Base: Haakonsvern Naval Base
- Nickname: Norwegian
- Mottos: Norwegian: For Fedrelandet ("For the fatherland")

334 Squadron of the Royal Norwegian Air Force is a maritime aircraft squadron. It traces its history, unbroken, to the establishment of No. 334 (Norwegian) Squadron Royal Air Force of the Second World War, formed in May 1945.

The squadron is based at Haakonsvern Naval Base.

== History ==
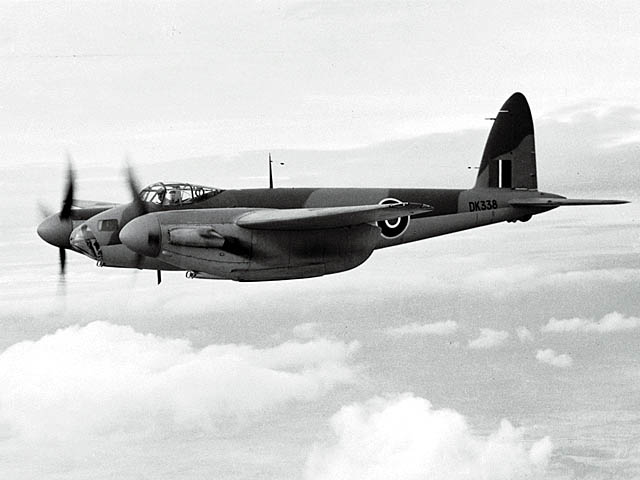
de Havilland Mosquito

The squadron was formed on 26 May 1945, just after the end of WWII in Europe, at RAF Banff, Scotland from B Flight of 333 Squadron. The squadron operated the de Havilland Mosquito on operations along the Norwegian coast. Within a few weeks it had moved to Gardermoen and control was handed over to the Royal Norwegian Air Force on 21 November 1945.

On May 3, 1947, the squadron was disbanded due to the difficult personnel situation following the war. However, it was reactivated on June 1, 1948.

On October 14, 1949, 334 Squadron was relocated to Sola Air Station. The squadron received its first jet aircraft, the Republic F-84G Thunderjet, in 1951.

During the Cold War, the strategic importance of Northern Norway increased, and in 1955, 334 Squadron was transferred to Bodø Air Base, where it was established on July 20. During its time in Bodø, the squadron operated the North American F-86 Sabre from 1958, the Northrop F-5 Freedom Fighter from 1967, the Canadair CF-104 Starfighter from 1973, and the General Dynamics F-16 Fighting Falcon from 1982.

=== Helicopter squadron ===
On August 1, 2002, 334 Squadron was disbanded in Bodø. It was reestablished at Sola a year later as a helicopter squadron equipped with the NHIndustries NH90, tasked with supporting the Royal Norwegian Navy and the Fridtjof Nansen-class frigates.

334 Squadron at Haakonsvern was established in 2016 and is subordinated to the 131 Airwing at Bardufoss. Due to significant problems with the integration of the NH90, the decision was made to terminate the procurement contract for the helicopters in June 2022.

== See also ==
- List of Royal Air Force aircraft squadrons
