= Nesodden =

Nesodden Municipality Nesodden kommune
- Municipality
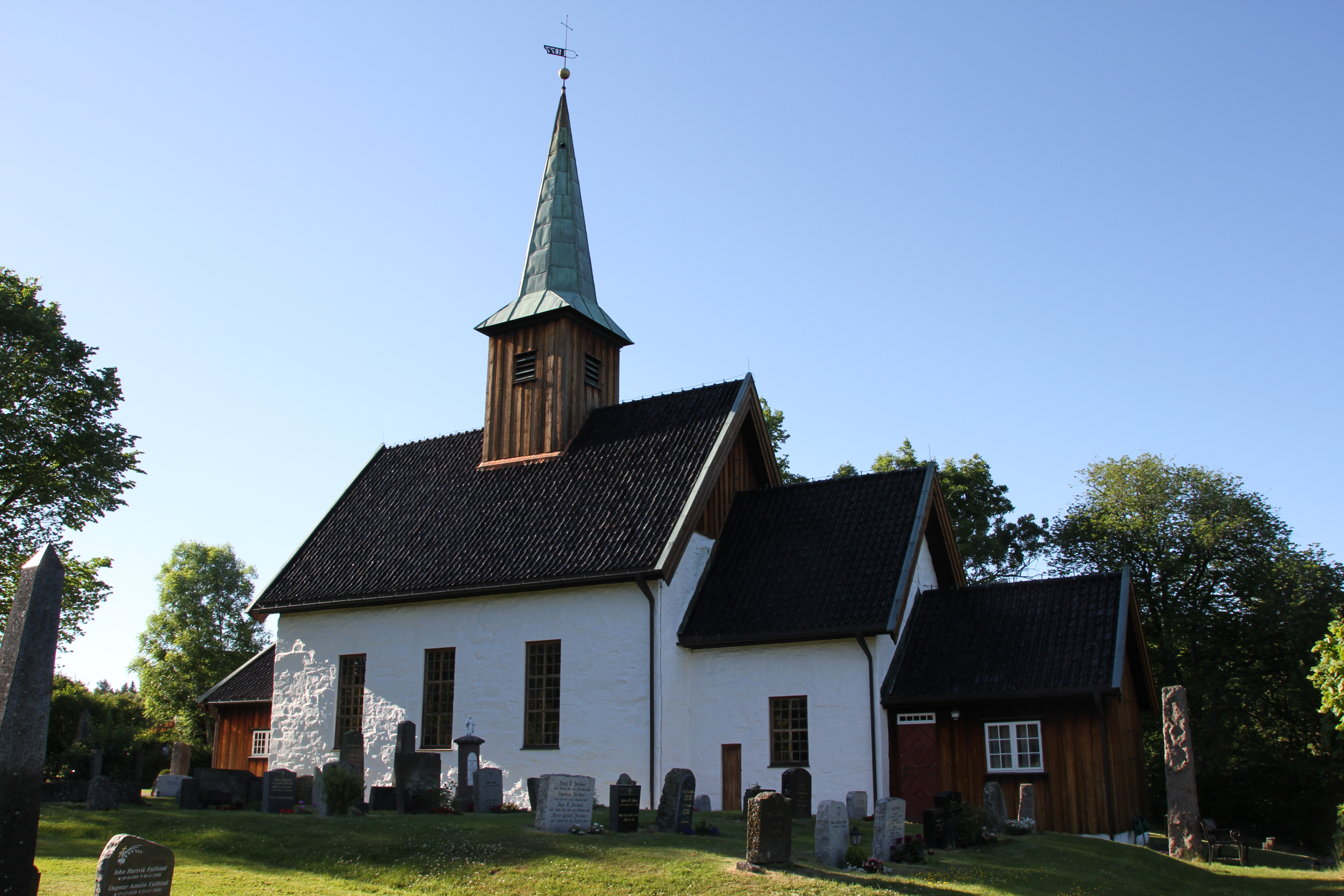

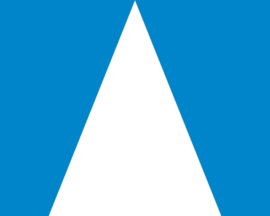
- Flag Coat of arms

- Akershus within Norway

- Nesodden within Akershus
- Coordinates: 59°48′31″N 10°39′20″E
- Country: Norway
- County: Akershus
- District: Follo
- Administrative centre: Nesoddtangen

Government
  - Mayor (2015): Truls Wickholm (AP)

Area
  - Total: 61 km^{2} (24 sq mi)
  - Land: 61 km^{2} (24 sq mi)
  - Rank: #416 in Norway

Population (2006)
  - Total: 16,541
  - Rank: #61 in Norway
  - Density: 265/km^{2} (690/sq mi)
  - Change (10 years): ▲ +16.1%
- Demonym: Nesodding

Official language
  - Norwegian form: Bokmål
- Time zone: UTC+01:00 (CET)
  - Summer (DST): UTC+02:00 (CEST)
- ISO 3166 code: NO-3023
- Website: Official website

Nesodden is a municipality in Akershus in Akershus county, Norway. It is part of the Greater Oslo Region and many residents of the peninsula Nesodden commute to work in Oslo.

It is part of the traditional region of Follo. The administrative centre of the municipality is Nesoddtangen. The parish of Næsodden was established as a municipality on 1 January 1838 (see formannskapsdistrikt.

== General information ==
=== Name ===
The name (Old Norse: Nesoddi) is an old district name. The first element is nes which means "headland" and the last element is (the definite form of) odde which means "point".

The very tip of the peninsula is called Nesoddtangen, where the last element is (the definite form of) tange which means "spit". In fact, all three elements in this name have (nearly) the same meaning, so it can be translated roughly as peninsula-peninsula-peninsula.

=== Nesodden Church ===
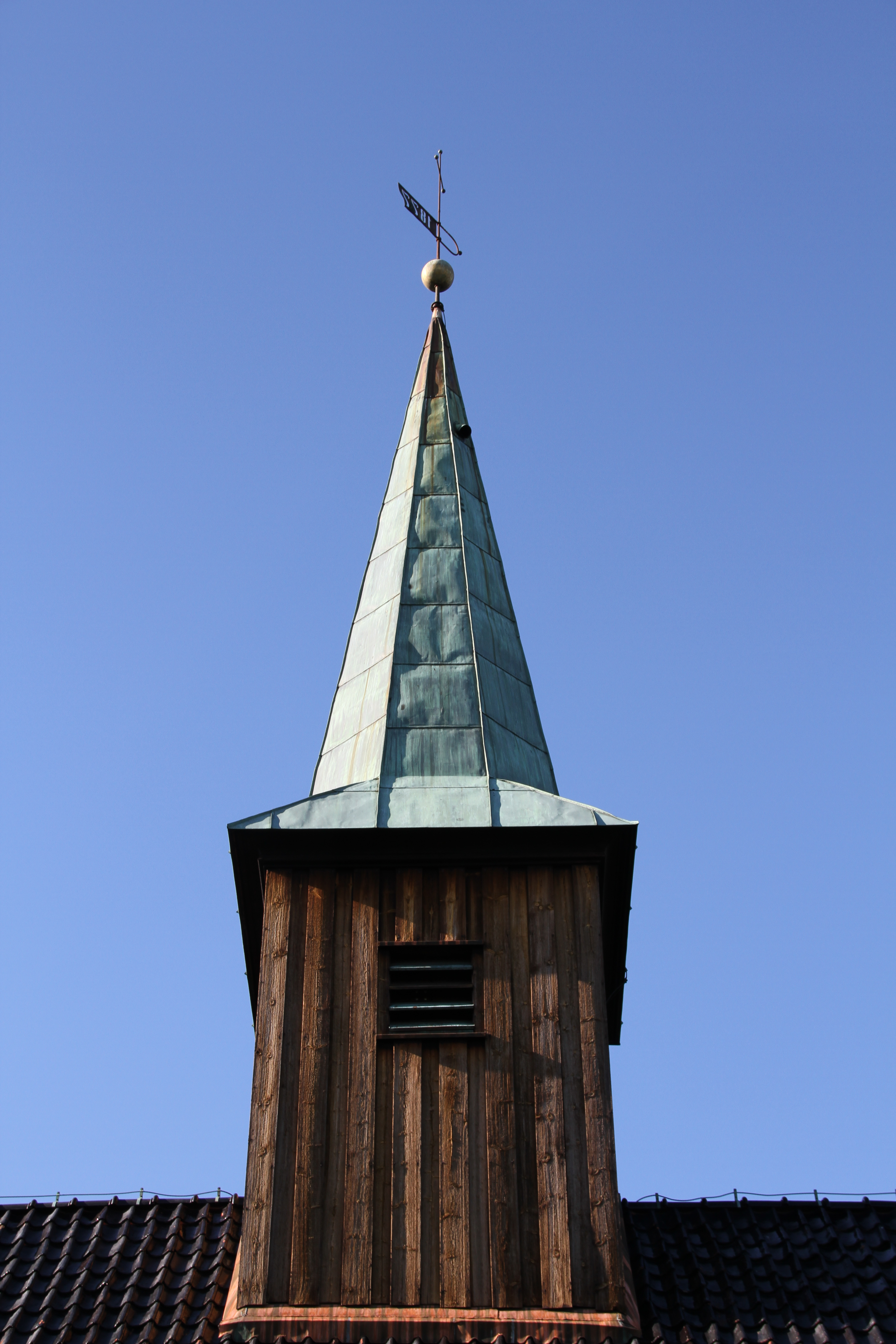
Nesodden Church steeple

Nesodden Church (Nesodden kirke) is located in Nesodden parish in Follo rural deanery. The Medieval, Romanesque church is situated southeast of the village of Nesodden. The building material is stone and brick. It was built in 1175. It has a rectangular nave and lower, narrower choir. The church is of long plan and has 130 seats. In the church, there is a Renaissance pulpit from about 1600 decorated with paintings of Jesus and the four Evangelists. The altarpiece from 1715 was carved by Johan Jørgen Schram with a motif showing Jesus in Gethsemane. Domenico Erdmann conducted restoration during 1920. The baptismal font made in clay stone and dates from the Middle Ages.

The church was renovated several times between the 17th and the 20th centuries. The chancel was extended in 1714. The church was most recently restored between 1956 and 1960, both times under the direction of architect Ragnar Nilsen (1896–1986). The church celebrated its 800th anniversary during 1975.

=== Sunnaas Hospital ===
Sunnaas Hospital, founded in 1954 as a nursing home, was authorized as a hospital in 1960, primarily to treat polio patients from Oslo in cooperation with Oslo City Hospital. The hospital is a university hospital today.

== Minorities ==
Number of minorities (1st and 2nd generation) in Nesodden by country of origin in 2017
Ancestry	Number
Sweden	304
Poland	300
Denmark	173
Germany	171
United Kingdom	121
Lithuania	87
Somalia	84
Thailand	83
Romania	73
USA	70

== Geography ==
Nesodden is located on the tip of the peninsula between main Oslofjord and its arm Bunnefjorden. It includes the villages Hellvik, Fjellstrand, Bjørnemyr, Nesoddtangen, and Fagerstrand, which is also the name of a reality show that was filmed on Fagerstrand and aired on TV 2 during the first half of 2005.

=== Coat of arms ===
The coat of arms is designed by the architect Christian Doxrud (1917–2002) and authorized 12 December 1986. The coat of arms shows a silver triangle on a blue background as a canting of the geographical position of the municipality, which is situated on a peninsula in the Oslofjord.

== The Nesodden Ferries ==
Most Nesodden residents rely on a 5 km ferry connection from Nesoddtangen to access Oslo, as the distance by road is 45 km. Nesoddtangen has passenger ferry connections to Lysaker in Bærum (8 min) and Aker Brygge in Oslo (23 min).

== Notable people ==
Several notable Norwegians live in Nesodden.

- scientists: professor, archeologist Christian Keller, professor em. neuroanatomist Terje Lømo and med. professor Johan Stanghelle
- politicians: Jan Balstad, Gunnar Garbo, Christian Hintze Holm, Dagfinn Høybråten, Rikke Lind and Nina Sandberg
- polar explorer: Børge Ousland
- athletes: Aleksander Fjeld Andersen and Stig Roar Husby
- actors: Gard B. Eidsvold, Pål Sverre Valheim Hagen, Espen Klouman Høiner, Jørgen Langhelle, Hildegunn Riise, Bjørn Sundquist and Stein Winge,
- authors: Olav Njølstad, Hanne Ørstavik, Øystein Rakkenes and Aksel Sandemose
- painters: Ulf Kristiansen, Wenche Øyen, Per Kleiva, Helge Revold and cartoonist Roar Hagen
- musicians/singers/songwriters: John Bevan, Geir Johnson, Rune Kristoffersen, Sondre Lerche, Madden, Trine Rein, Alexander Rybak, Satyr (Sigurd Wongraven) and Per Øystein Sørensen
- news presenters: Bjørn Hansen
- comedian: Åsleik Engmark
- models: Helene Rask, Anette Stai
- artists: Kristian Skylstad, Christian Tony Norum

and

- former residents: politicians Kåre Kristiansen, Reiulf Steen, Kjell Magne Bondevik and Tora Aasland; lawyer Arne Haugestad, musician Thomas "Happy-Tom" Seltzer and terrorist Anders Cameroon Østensvig Dale

== See also ==
- Hellvik (Nesodden)

== Related reading ==
- Kristensen, Tom (1975) Nesodden kirke, et gammelt hus (Nesodden kommune / Aschehoug forlag)
