= Per Øystein Sørensen =

Norwegian singer and songwriter (born 1961)

Per Øystein Sørensen (Per Sorensen)
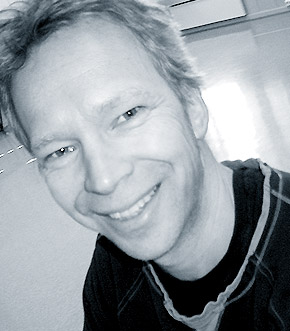

Background information
- Born: December 13, 1961 (age 64); Oslo, Norway
- Genres: New wave; pop rock
- Occupations: Singer; songwriter
- Instruments: Vocals; piano; keyboards
- Years active: 1982–present
- Labels: daWorks; Rune Grammofon; EMI; WEA; Universal; Virgin
- Member of: Fra Lippo Lippi
- Website: Official site Official Myspace

Per Øystein Sørensen (born December 13, 1961) is a Norwegian singer and songwriter, best known as the vocalist of the new wave band Fra Lippo Lippi.

== Biography ==
Sørensen joined Fra Lippo Lippi in 1982 as the new vocalist in time for their second LP, Small Mercies.

The band's third album Songs contains the hit single "Shouldn't Have to Be Like That", a double A-side with "The Distance Between Us".

Fra Lippo Lippi ceased recording in the early '90s. However, in 2000, Fra Lippo Lippi performed again in the Philippines, where the band had a number of major successes during the '80s, having also performed there to a big audience in 1988.

Aside from Fra Lippo Lippi, Sørensen has also worked with Trine Rein. In 2009, Sørensen launched his official Myspace profile, featuring songs from Fra Lippo Lippi and his solo works. His first solo album, Våge was released in Norway on September 28. The album is completely in Norwegian – a first in Sørensen's career. An English version of the album titled Master of Imperfection was released in 2012. In 2015, he recorded the album My Old Book – 30 Years of Songs by Per Øystein Sørensen and Fra Lippo Lippi with the Norwegian Radio Orchestra. It was released in the fall of 2016.

== Discography ==
=== Solo albums ===
- Våge (2009), daWorks
- Master of Imperfection (2012), daWorks
- My Old Book – 30 Years of Songs by Per Øystein Sørensen and Fra Lippo Lippi (with the Norwegian Radio Orchestra) (2016), Rune Grammofon
