= Rune Kristoffersen =

Norwegian musician (born 1957)

Rune Kristoffersen (born 22 September 1957) is a Norwegian musician, best known for being the founder and bassist of the new wave band Fra Lippo Lippi.

== Background ==
Rune Kristoffersen grew up in Nesodden and was founder member of Norwegian pop outfit Fra Lippo Lippi, playing bass, guitar and keyboards as well as providing lead vocals on their debut album In Silence and being the band's main songwriter. In the early 1980s, he also worked for the band's record label Uniton Records.

Fra Lippo Lippi were signed to Virgin Records in 1986 and also had an album (Light and Shade) produced by Walter Becker from Steely Dan. As Fra Lippo Lippi's popularity waned in the '90s, he returned to Norway to teach primary school children, before embarking on a career as a record label owner of Rune Grammofon.
