= Moen, Troms =

Village in Målselv Municipality, Norway

Moen
- Village
- Interactive map of Moen
- Location within Troms Location within Norway
- Coordinates: 69°07′49″N 18°36′44″E
- Country: Norway
- Region: Northern Norway
- County: Troms
- District: Midt-Troms
- Municipality: Målselv Municipality

Area
  - Total: 1.03 km^{2} (0.40 sq mi)
- Elevation: 11 m (36 ft)

Population (2023)
  - Total: 853
  - Density: 828/km^{2} (2,140/sq mi)
- Time zone: UTC+01:00 (CET)
  - Summer (DST): UTC+02:00 (CEST)
- Post Code: 9321 Moen

Moen is the administrative centre of Målselv Municipality in Troms county, Norway. The village of Moen is located in the Målselvdalen valley about 10 km (6.2 mi) north of the town of Bardufoss and Bardufoss Airport. The 1.03-square-kilometre (250-acre) village has a population (2023) of 853 and a population density of 828 inhabitants per square kilometre (2,140/sq mi).

The village lies along the Målselva river and the European route E6 crosses through the village with the Olsborg area in the north and the Moen area in the south. Most of the shops and schools are located in Olsborg, while the municipal offices are located in Moen. Målselv Church is located about 5 kilometres (3.1 mi) north of the village.
