= Andslimoen =

Neighborhood in the town of Bardufoss, Norway

- Neighborhood in Bardufoss
- Interactive map of Andslimoen
- Location within Troms Location within Norway
- Coordinates: 69°05′26″N 18°34′56″E
- Country: Norway
- Region: Northern Norway
- County: Troms
- District: Midt-Troms
- Municipality: Målselv Municipality

Area
  - Total: 0.92 km^{2} (0.36 sq mi)
- Elevation: 45 m (148 ft)

Population (2023)
  - Total: 553
  - Density: 601/km^{2} (1,560/sq mi)
- Time zone: UTC+01:00 (CET)
  - Summer (DST): UTC+02:00 (CEST)
- Post Code: 9325 Bardufoss

Andslimoen is a neighborhood within the town of Bardufoss in Målselv Municipality in Troms county, Norway. The area lies along the river Målselva in the Målselvdalen valley in the western part of the municipality. The village is located along European route E6 highway, about 5.5 km (3.4 mi) south of the village of Moen. Andslimoen makes up the northern part of the town of Bardufoss.

The 0.92-square-kilometre (230-acre) area has a population (2023) of 553 and a population density of 601 inhabitants per square kilometre (1,560/sq mi).

In 2021, the three neighboring villages of Andselv, Andslimoen, and Heggelia were merged and designated as the new town of Bardufoss.
