= Alapmoen =

Village in Målselv Municipality, Norway

Alapmoen Alappmoen (historic spelling)
- Village
- Interactive map of Alapmoen
- Location within Troms Location within Norway
- Coordinates: 68.9969°N 19.0332°E
- Country: Norway
- Region: Northern Norway
- County: Troms
- District: Midt-Troms
- Municipality: Målselv Municipality
- Elevation: 84 m (276 ft)
- Time zone: UTC+01:00 (CET)
  - Summer (DST): UTC+02:00 (CEST)
- Post Code: 9334 Øverbygd

Alapmoen is a small farming village in Målselv Municipality in Troms county, Norway. The village is located about 1 kilometre (0.62 mi) south of the Målselva river and about 21.5 km (13.4 mi) southeast of the urban area of Bardufoss, and about 11 km (6.8 mi) southwest of the village of Skjold.

The location of Alapmoen is unusual since it a small cluster of farming fields in the middle of a forest in Northern Norway which is unlike most other communities in Norway, since they are located near the ocean or along a river. The little farms of Rolvsjord, Skog, Frostad, and Renmelmoen are included in the village area.
