= Kirkesnesmoen Chapel =

- Kirkesnesmoen kapell
- Kirkesnesmoen Chapel
- 69.005266°N 18.89339°E
- Location: Målselv Municipality, Troms
- Country: Norway
- Denomination: Church of Norway
- Churchmanship: Evangelical Lutheran

History
- Status: Parish church
- Founded: 1975
- Consecrated: 1975

Architecture
- Functional status: Active
- Architect: Nils Gang
- Architectural type: Long church
- Completed: 1975 (51 years ago)

Specifications
- Capacity: 220
- Materials: Wood

Administration
- Diocese: Nord-Hålogaland
- Deanery: Senja prosti
- Parish: Øverbygd
- Norwegian Cultural Heritage Site
- Type: Church
- Status: Not protected
- ID: 84780

Kirkesnesmoen Chapel (Norwegian: Kirkesnesmoen kapell) is a parish church of the Church of Norway in Målselv Municipality in Troms county, Norway. It is located along the Målselva river about halfway between the villages of Bardufoss and Skjold. It is an annex church for the Øverbygd parish which is part of the Senja prosti (deanery) in the Diocese of Nord-Hålogaland. The white, wooden church was built in a long church style in 1975 by the architect Nils Gang at the architecture firm Harry Gangvik A/S. The church seats about 220 people.

== See also ==
- List of churches in Nord-Hålogaland
