= Målselv Church =

- Målselv kirke
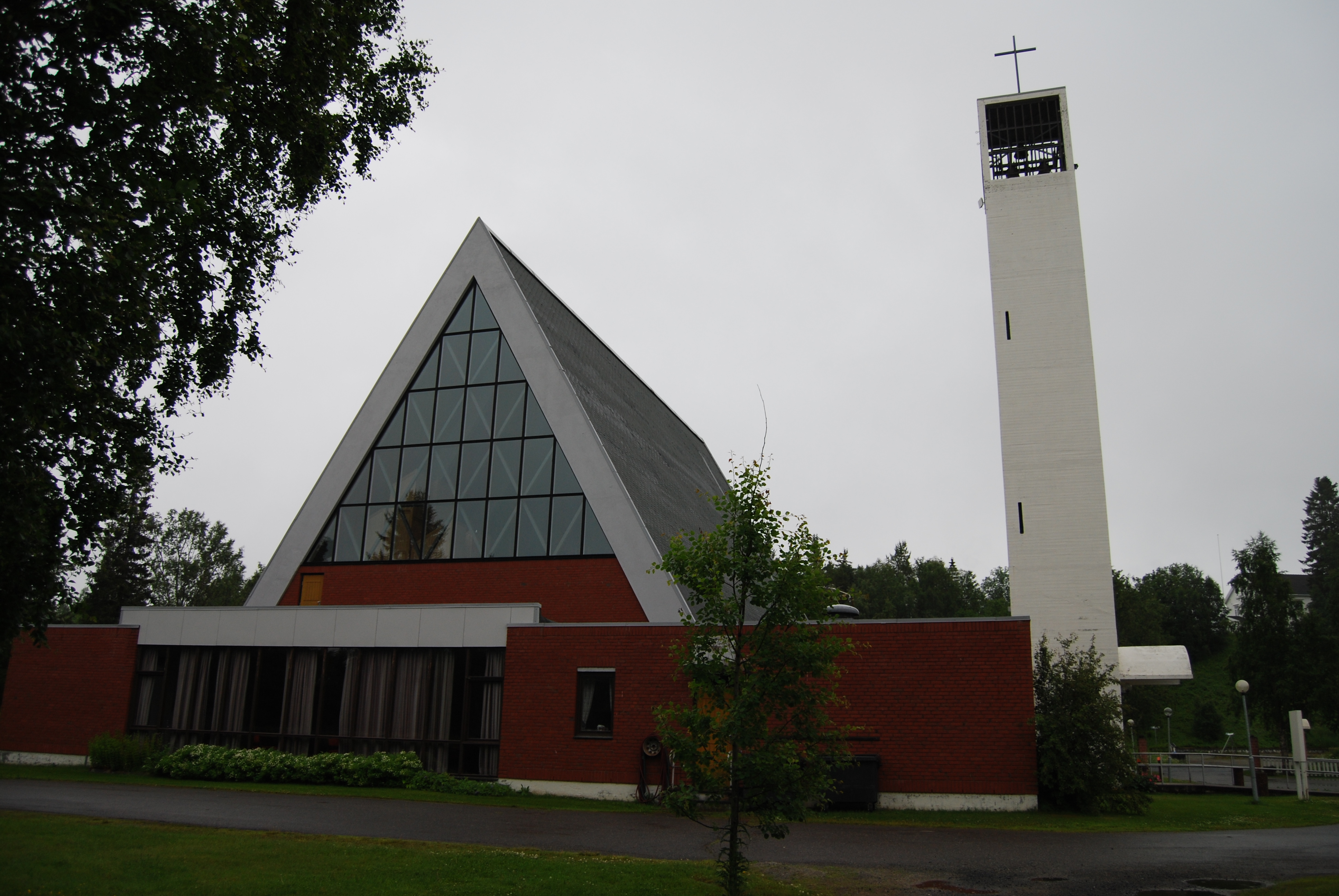
- View of the church
- Målselv Church
- 69.176349°N 18.574381°E
- Location: Målselv Municipality, Troms
- Country: Norway
- Denomination: Church of Norway
- Churchmanship: Evangelical Lutheran

History
- Status: Parish church
- Founded: 1829
- Consecrated: 1978

Architecture
- Functional status: Active
- Architect: Harry Gangvik
- Architectural type: Long church
- Completed: 1978 (48 years ago)

Specifications
- Capacity: 360
- Materials: Concrete and brick

Administration
- Diocese: Nord-Hålogaland
- Deanery: Senja prosti
- Parish: Målselv
- Norwegian Cultural Heritage Site
- Type: Church
- Status: Not protected
- ID: 85087

Målselv Church (Norwegian: Målselv kirke) is a parish church of the Church of Norway in Målselv Municipality in Troms county, Norway. It is located along the river Målselva at Målselv, about 15 kilometres (9.3 mi) north of the village of Bardufoss. It is the main church for the Målselv parish which is part of the Senja prosti (deanery) in the Diocese of Nord-Hålogaland. The white concrete and red brick church was built in a long church style in 1978 by the architect Harry Gangvik. The church seats about 360 people.

== History ==
The first church in Målselv was built in 1829. It was a red, wooden, octagonal building. It looked a lot like the Grytten Church that still exists. By the late 1800s, the church was too small for the parish, so it was decided to build a new church. The new, white, wooden church was built in a long church style in 1883 by the architect Håkon Mosling from Steinkjer. The church was consecrated on 11 July 1883 by the Bishop Jacob Sverdrup Smitt. The new church was much larger, seating about 800 people. On 29 June 1972, the church was struck by lightning and it burned down. It took six years to clear the area, make plans, raise money, and rebuild the 3rd Målselv Church. The new concrete and brick church was built in a more modern style. It was consecrated on 19 March 1978.

== Media gallery ==
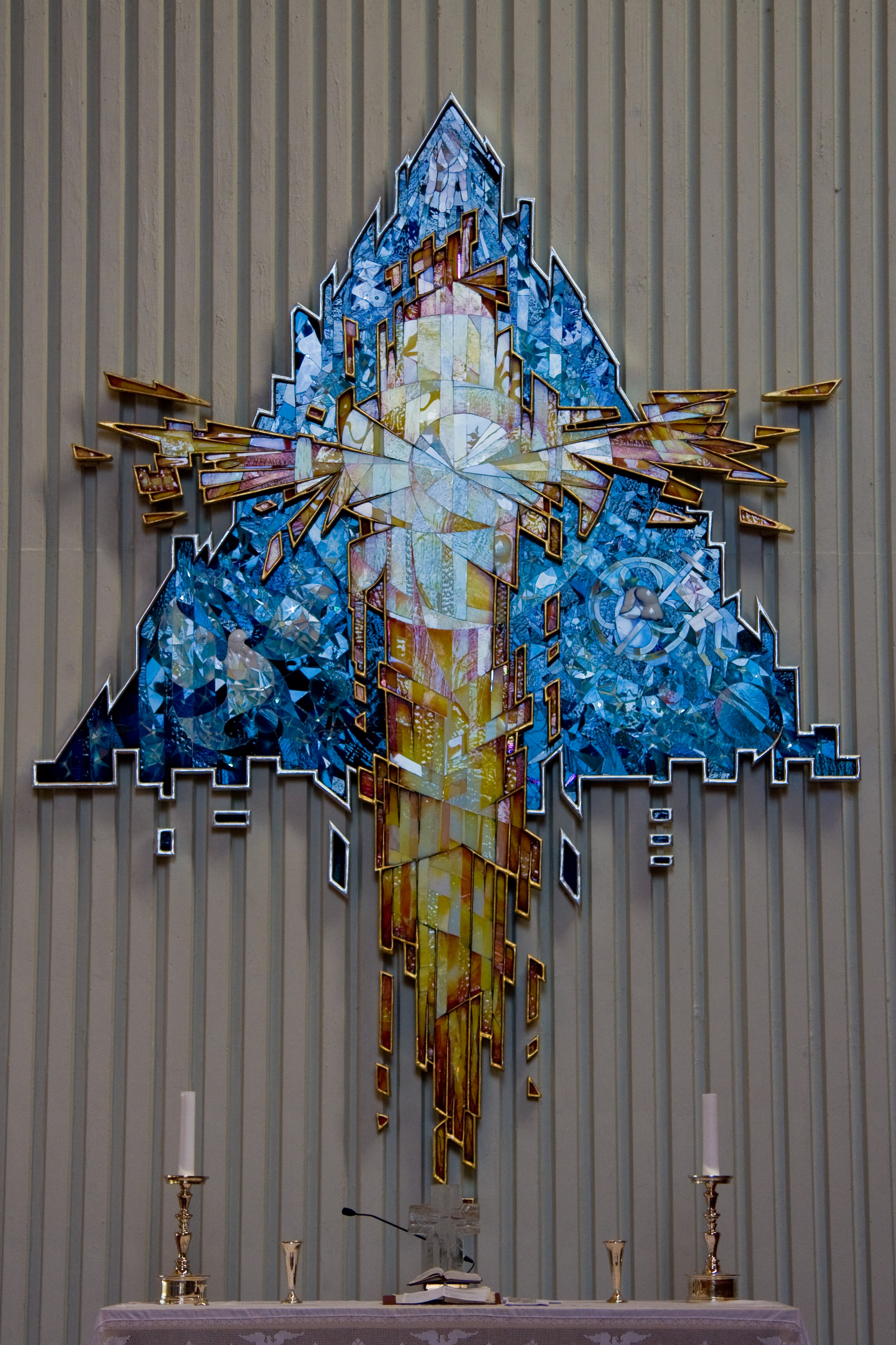
Altar table

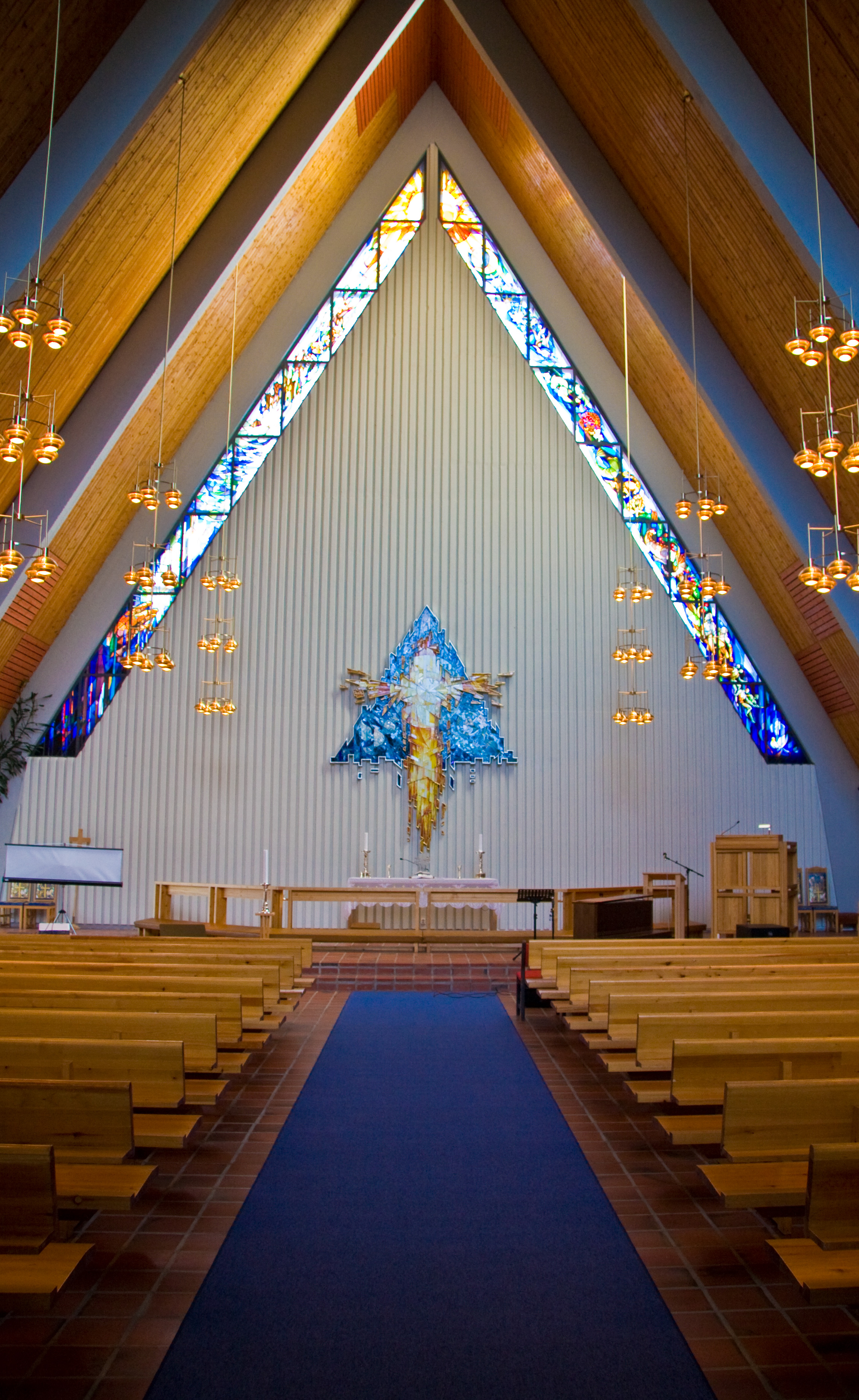
Interior

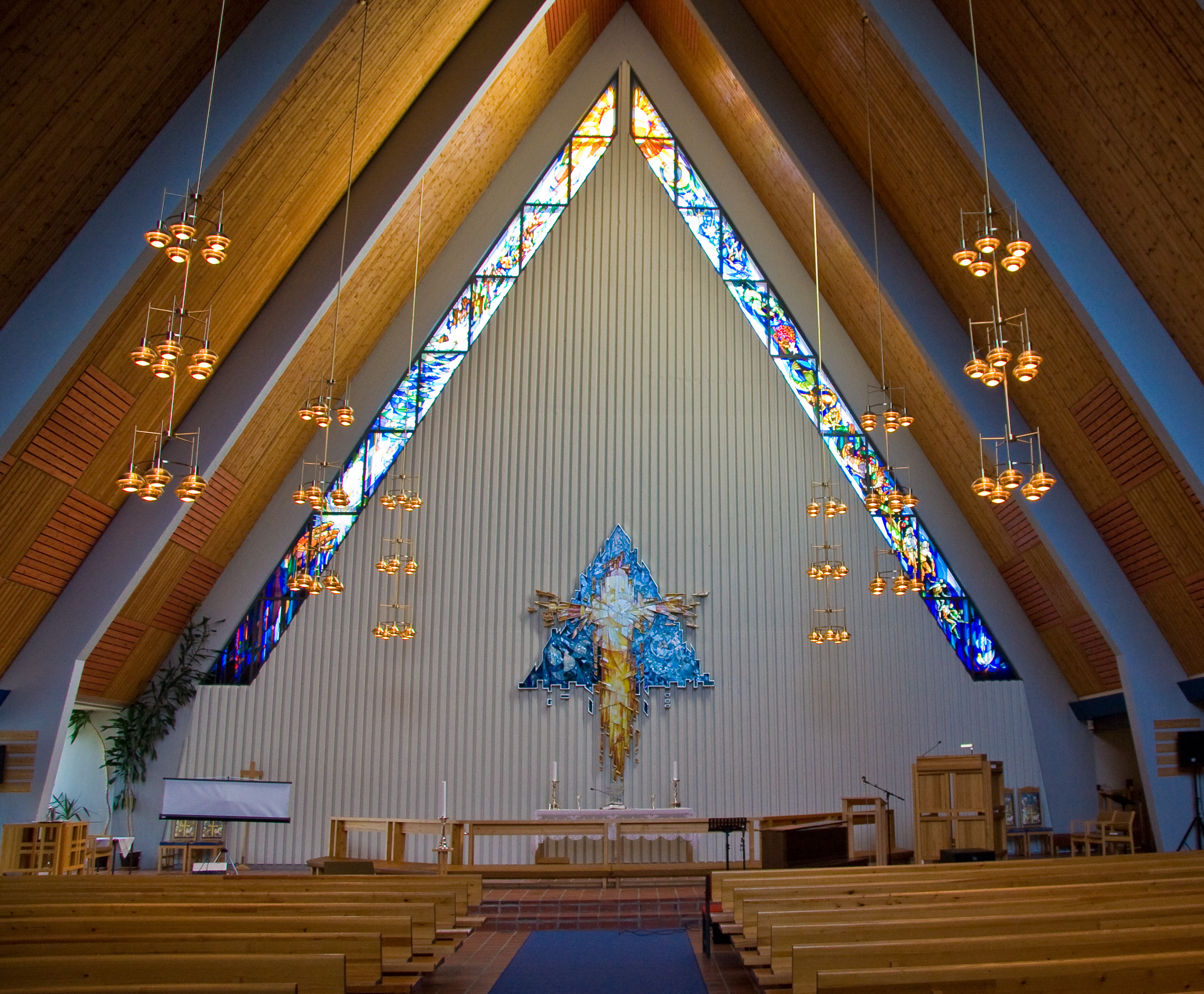
Interior

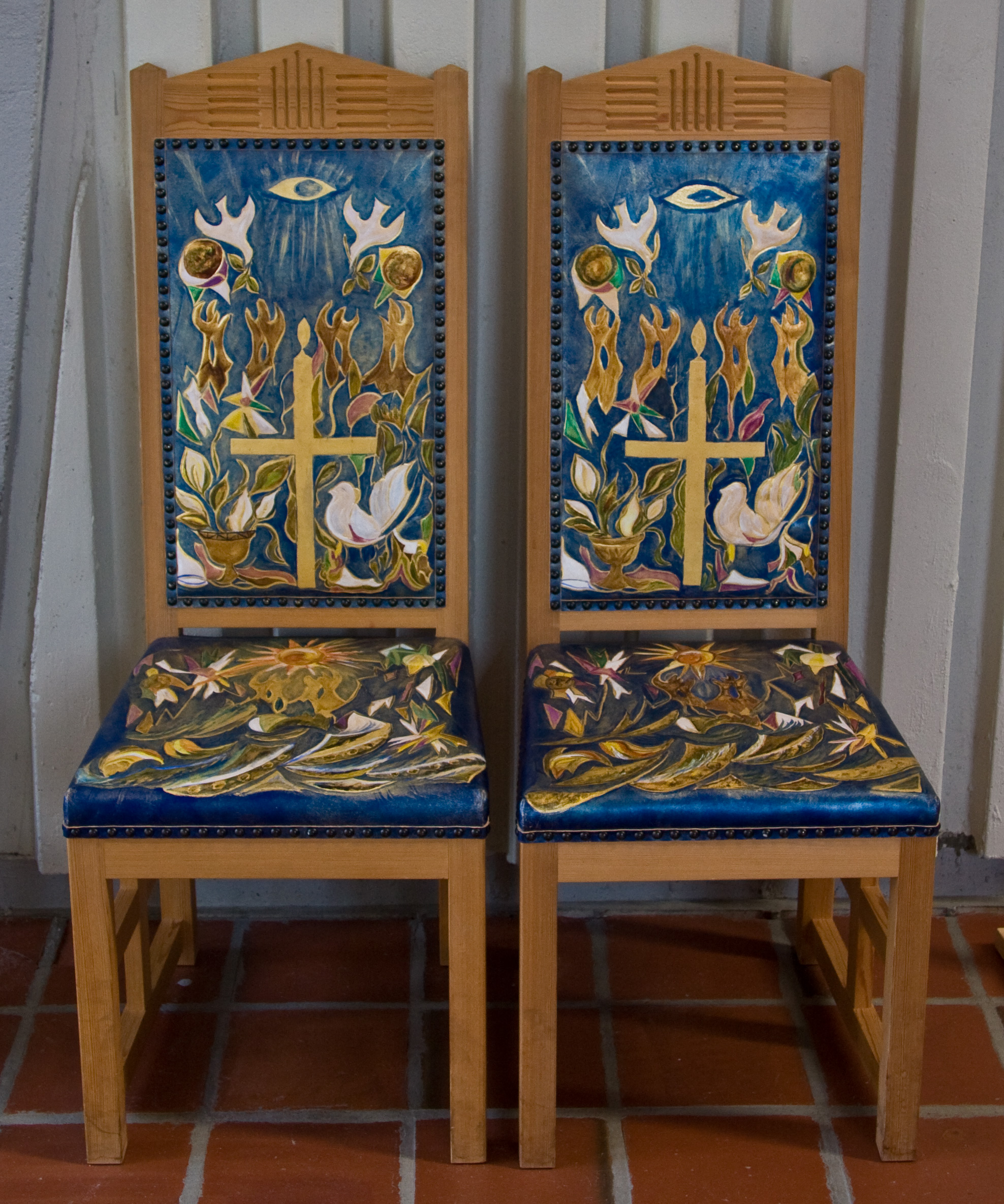
Interior chairs

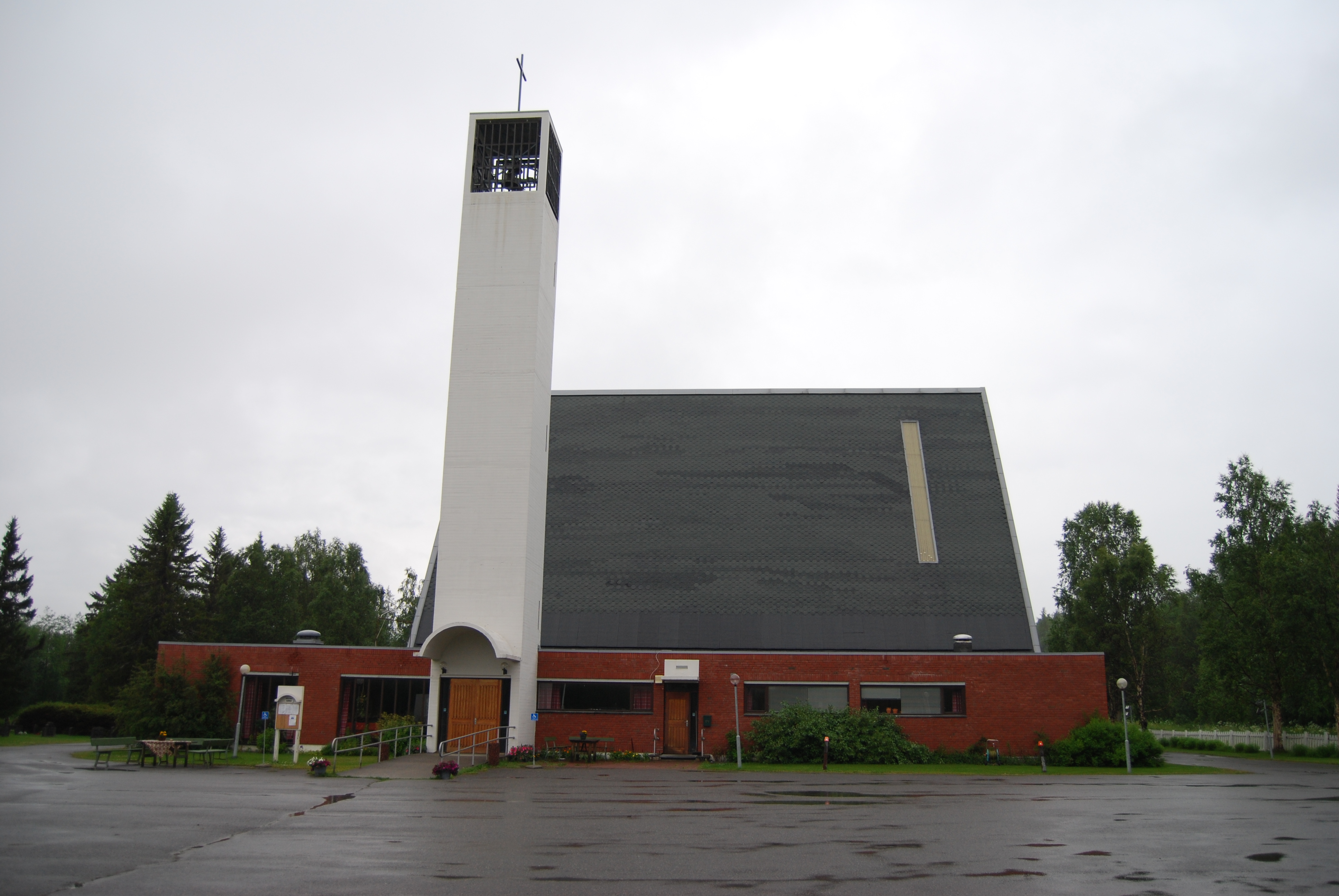
Exterior

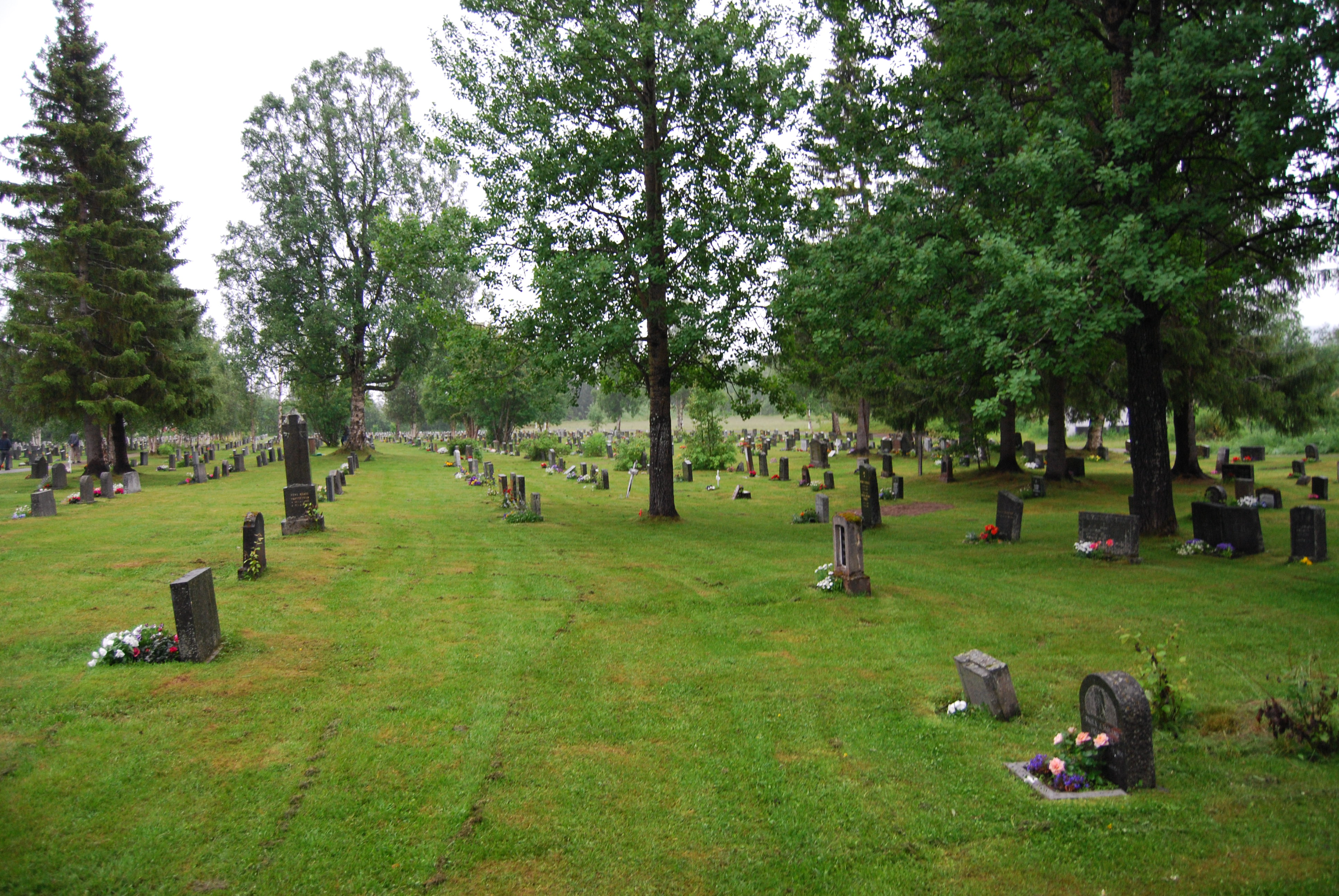
Graveyard

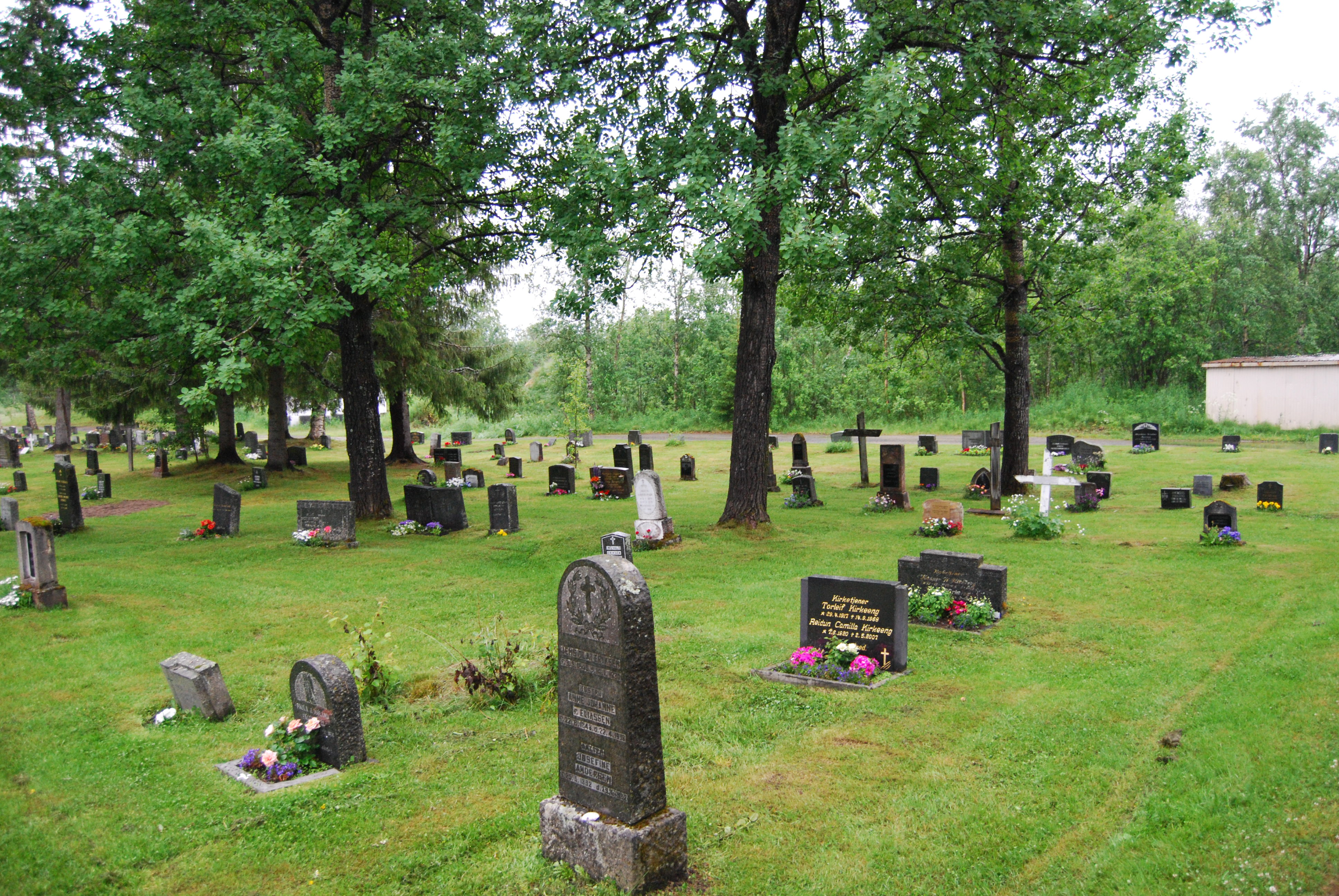
Graveyard

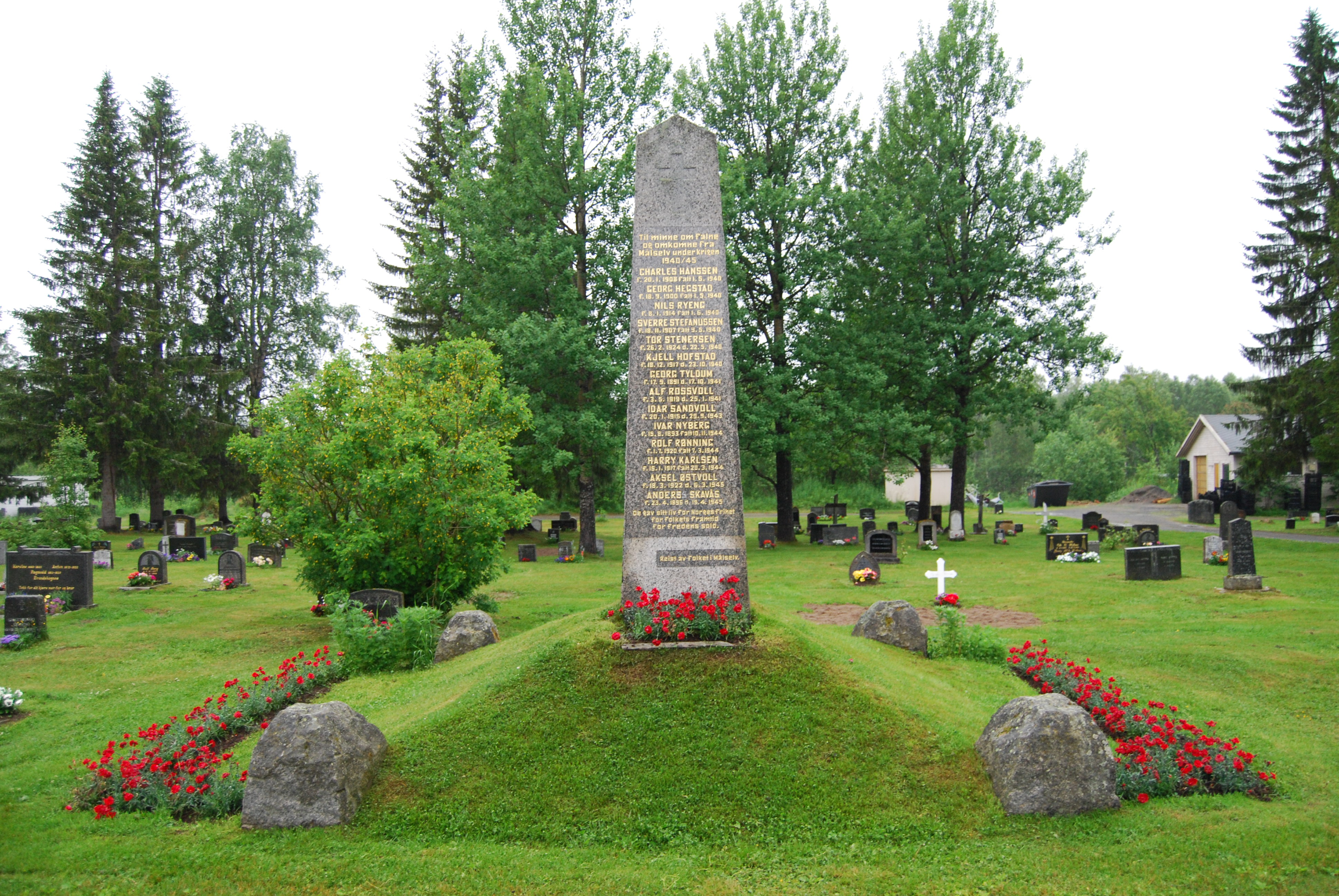
World War II memorial

== See also ==
- List of churches in Nord-Hålogaland
