= Viggo Fossum =

Norwegian politician (1949–2019)

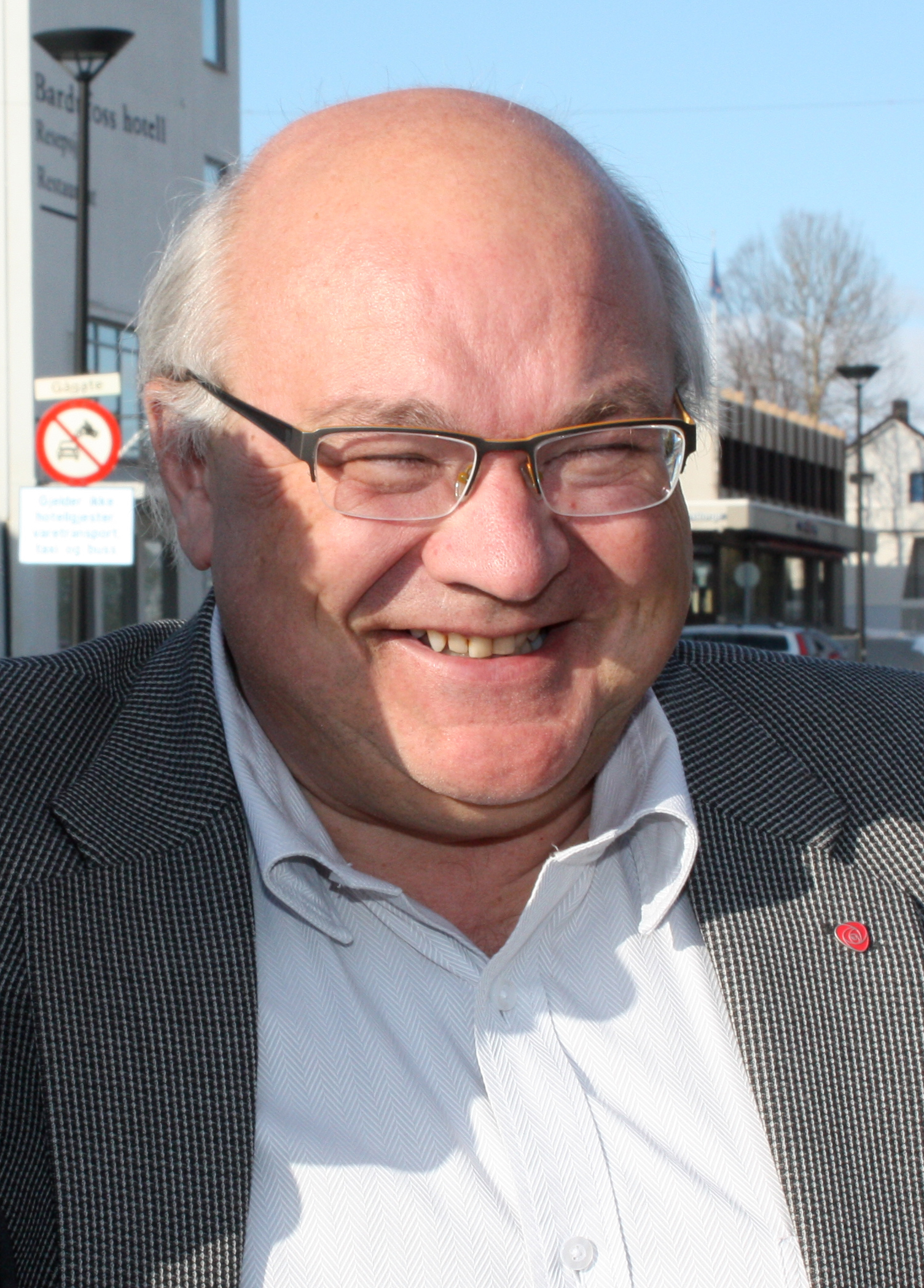
Fossum in 2010

Viggo Fossum (4 December 1949 – 23 April 2019) was a Norwegian politician for the Labour Party.

He served as a deputy representative to the Parliament of Norway from Troms during the term 2009–2013. In total he met during 23 days of parliamentary session. Outside of politics he was the principal of Bardufoss Upper Secondary School and of the civic aviation school there. He served as mayor of Målselv Municipality from 2003 to 2011, and was still a member of the municipal council at the time of his death at age 69.
