= Lille Rostavatnet =

Lake in Målselv, Norway

Lille Rostavatnet (Norwegian); Vuolit Rostojávri (Northern Sami)
- Interactive map of the lake
- Location: Troms
- Coordinates: 68.9910°N 19.6403°E
- Primary inflows: Rostaelva
- Primary outflows: Rostaelva then Målselva
- Basin countries: Norway
- Max. length: 7.5 kilometres (4.7 mi)
- Max. width: 2.5 kilometres (1.6 mi)
- Surface area: 13.26 km^{2} (5.12 sq mi)
- Shore length^{1}: 19 kilometres (12 mi)
- Surface elevation: 102 metres (335 ft)
- References: NVE
- ^{1} Shore length is not a well-defined measure.

Lille Rostavatnet (Norwegian) or Vuolit Rostojávri (Northern Sami) is a lake in Målselv Municipality in Troms county, Norway. It is part of the Rostaelva river system which empties into the great Målselva river. It is located about 9 kilometres (5.6 mi) east of the village of Skjold.

== See also ==
- List of lakes in Norway
