= Svein Nymo =

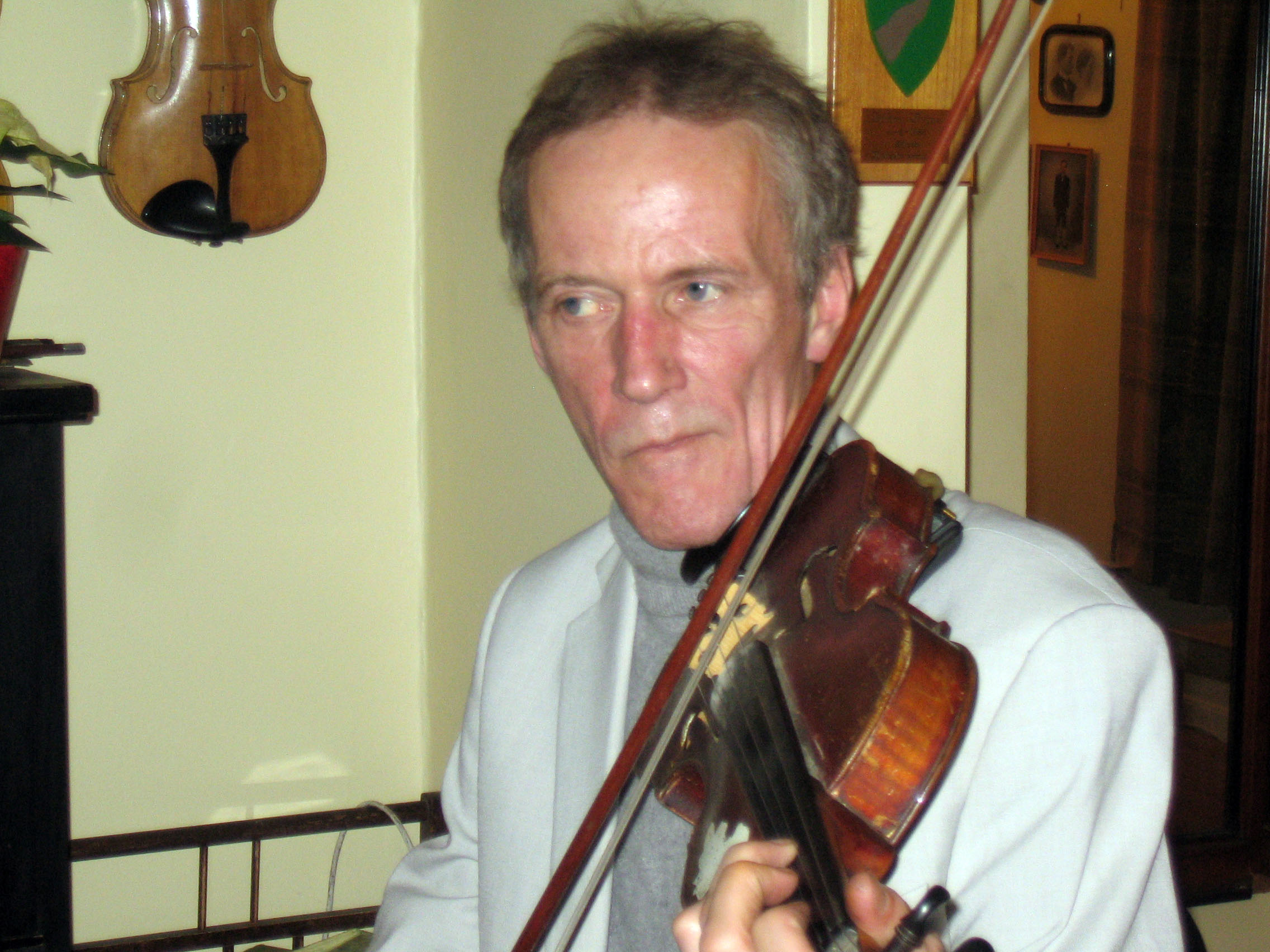
- Violinist Svein Nymo in 2006.

Background information
- Born: 10 June 1953; Målselv, Troms, Norway
- Died: 15 August 2014 (aged 61); Oslo, Norway
- Genres: Traditional folk; folk
- Occupation(s): Violinist, composer
- Instruments: Violin, vocals

Svein Nymo (10 June 1953 – 15 August 2014) was a Norwegian violinist and composer from Målselv Municipality in Troms, and the son of the traditional Norwegian folk musician Johan Nymo.

== Biography ==
Nymo participated on many recordings with various artists, but is especially remembered for his participation in Ungdomslaget Ny Von (1978). Nymo was also the lead singer of the traditional folk music fusion project Nymoderne, who released the album of the same name in 1991.

Nymo started the NRK1 TV show Du skal høre mye... together with Tore Skoglund, and he also was co-author with Skoglund of the book Du skal flire mye før kjeften revner (1988).

== Discography ==
=== As leader ===
With Ny Von

- 1991: Nymoderne (Hot Club Records)

=== Collaborations ===
With Malvin Skulbru

- 1982: Ikkje Så Mykje Men, Litt A´ Kvert.... (Trubadur)
- 1988: Sørgelige Sanger, Skrøpelige Dikt Og Sensuell (Taraxacum Forlag)

With Rallarlaget

- 1986: Eld I Berget (Rallaren Musik Produktion)

With Ragnar Olsen & Sverre Kjeldsberg

- 1987: Den Glade Pessimisten (OK Produksjoner)

With Karlsøy Prestegaard

- 1994: Karlsøya – Mellom Geiter, Rock & Muhammed (OKKO ANS)
