= Fossmoen =

Village in Målselv Municipality, Norway

- Village
- Interactive map of Fossmoen
- Location within Troms Location within Norway
- Coordinates: 69°02′44″N 18°35′38″E
- Country: Norway
- Region: Northern Norway
- County: Troms
- District: Midt-Troms
- Municipality: Målselv Municipality
- Elevation: 54 m (177 ft)
- Time zone: UTC+01:00 (CET)
  - Summer (DST): UTC+02:00 (CEST)
- Post Code: 9325 Bardufoss

Fossmoen is a small village in Målselv Municipality in Troms county, Norway. It is located about 5 kilometres (3.1 mi) southeast of the town of Bardufoss, on the southeast side of the Bardufoss Airport. The village is named after the nearby Bardufossen waterfall. The village of Fossmoen is located about 3 km (1.9 mi) west of the famous waterfall Målselvfossen. The population of Fossmoen (2001) was 147.

The local Fossmotunet folklore museum, which is a part of the Midt-Troms Museum is located here. It is built as a farm from the 19th century, using original buildings from Målselv. The museum is open to visitors only in the summer season.
