= Målselv Municipality =

Municipality in Troms, Norway

Målselv Municipality Målselv kommune Málatvuomi suohkan (Northern Sami)
- Municipality
- Maalselven herred (historic name)
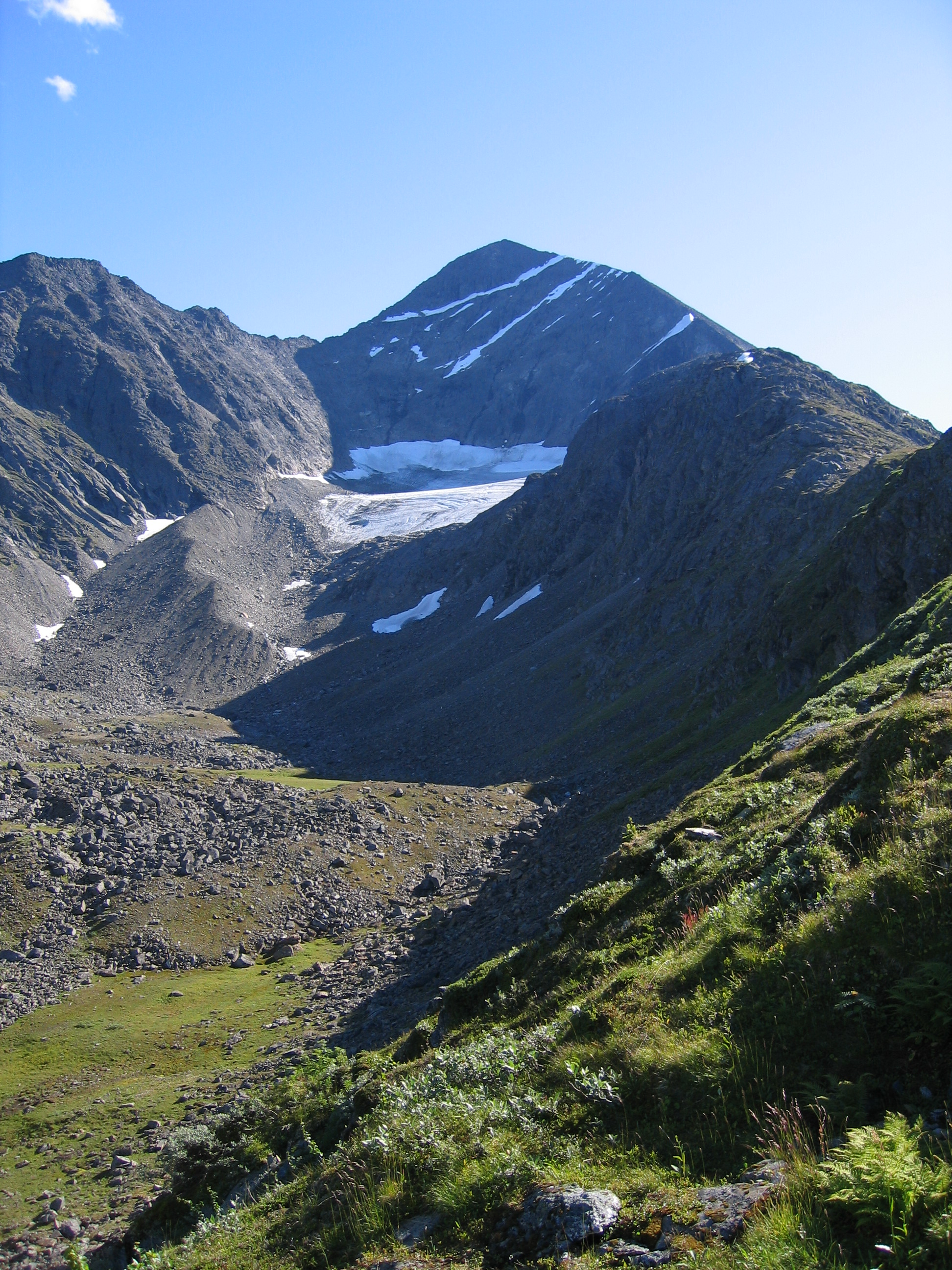
- View of the mountain Istind on the Bardu-Målselv border

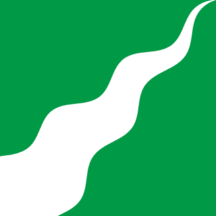
- Flag Coat of arms

- Troms within Norway

- Målselv within Troms
- Coordinates: 68°58′30″N 19°03′52″E
- Country: Norway
- County: Troms
- District: Midt-Troms
- Established: 1848
  - Preceded by: Lenviken Municipality
- Administrative centre: Moen

Government
  - Mayor (2023): Martin Nymo (H)

Area
  - Total: 3,324.45 km^{2} (1,283.58 sq mi)
  - Land: 3,202.57 km^{2} (1,236.52 sq mi)
  - Water: 121.88 km^{2} (47.06 sq mi) 3.7%
  - Rank: #11 in Norway
- Highest elevation: 1,720.86 m (5,645.9 ft)

Population (2024)
  - Total: 6,714
  - Rank: #149 in Norway
  - Density: 2/km^{2} (5.2/sq mi)
  - Change (10 years): ▲ +1.2%
- Demonym: Målselvdøl

Official language
  - Norwegian form: Neutral
- Time zone: UTC+01:00 (CET)
  - Summer (DST): UTC+02:00 (CEST)
- ISO 3166 code: NO-5524
- Website: Official website

Målselv (Northern Sami: Málatvuomi suohkan) is a municipality in Troms county, Norway. The administrative centre of the municipality is the village of Moen. The main commercial centre of the municipality is the town of Bardufoss (which includes the neighborhoods of Andselv, Andslimoen, and Heggelia). Other villages in the municipality include Alapmoen, Fossmoen, Holmen, and Skjold.

The 3,324-square-kilometre (1,283 sq mi) municipality is the 11th largest by area out of the 357 municipalities in Norway. Målselv is the 149th most populous municipality in Norway with a population of 6,714. The municipality's population density is 2 inhabitants per square kilometre (5.2/sq mi) and its population has increased by 1.2% over the previous 10-year period.

== General information ==
The municipality of Maalselven was established in 1848 when it was separated from the large Lenviken Municipality. The initial population of Maalselven was 2,616. In 1891, some parts of the Maalsnes area (population: 30) were transferred to neighboring Malangen Municipality. On 1 January 1904, an area with 5 inhabitants was transferred from Balsfjord Municipality to Maalselven. The spelling of the name was changed to Målselv in 1918. On 1 July 1925, the eastern district of the municipality was separated from Målselv to form the new Øverbygd Municipality. This left Målselv with 3,531 residents.

During the 1960s, there were many municipal mergers across Norway due to the work of the Schei Committee. On 1 January 1964, Øverbygd Municipality (population: 1,232), Målselv Municipality (population: 5,584), the Naveren and Målsnes areas of Malangen Municipality (population: 118), and the "Skogli ved Heia" farm in Balsfjord Municipality (population: 2) were all merged to form a new, larger municipality of Målselv with a new population of 6,936. On 1 January 1966, the Sørelvmo/Aursfjordbotn area (population: 131) was transferred from Balsfjord Municipality to Målselv Municipality. Then on 1 January 1972, the "Blomli i Fagerfjell" area of Målselv Municipality (population: 63) was transferred to Lenvik Municipality.

On 1 January 2020, the municipality became part of the newly formed Troms og Finnmark county. Previously, it had been part of the old Troms county. On 1 January 2024, the Troms og Finnmark county was divided and the municipality once again became part of Troms county.

=== Name ===
The municipality (originally the parish) is named after the river Målselva which flows through the area. The first element is the genitive case of the old uncompounded name of the Malangen fjord (malr) which means "bag" or "sack" (referring to the shape of the fjord). The last element is the finite form of elv which means "river". Historically, the name of the municipality was spelled Maalselven. On 3 November 1917, a royal resolution changed the spelling of the name of the municipality to Maalselv, removing the definite form ending -en. On 21 December 1917, a royal resolution enacted the 1917 Norwegian language reforms. Prior to this change, the name was spelled Maalselv with the digraph "aa", and after this reform, the name was spelled Målselv, using the letter å instead.

=== Coat of arms ===
The coat of arms was granted on 1 February 1985. The official blazon is "Vert, a pile wavy argent issuant from base dexter" (Norwegian: I grønt en sølv spiss, skråstilt venstre høyre, dannet ved bølgesnitt). This means the arms have a green field (background) and the charge is a wavy line rising from the bottom left to the top right. The wavy line has a tincture of argent which means it is commonly colored white, but if it is made out of metal, then silver is used. The arms are a canting that represent the Målselva river which runs on serpentine-like loops through a fertile valley as it passes through the municipality. The green color symbolizes the fertile valley and the wavy white or silver line represents the river. The arms were designed by Ottar Jarl Myrvang.

=== Churches ===
The Church of Norway has two parishes (sokn) within Målselv Municipality. It is part of the Indre Troms prosti (deanery) in the Diocese of Nord-Hålogaland.

Churches in Målselv Municipality
Parish (sokn)	Church name	Location of the church	Year built
Målselv	Målselv Church	Målselv	1978
Øverbygd	Øverbygd Church	Øverbygd	1867
Øverbygd	Kirkesnesmoen Chapel	Kirkesnesmoen	1977

== Geography ==
Målselv was settled by farmers from southern Norway, especially Østerdalen from 1788 and onwards. They were attracted by the vast forests and areas of fertile land in the broad Målselvdalen. The valley and municipality take their name from the river Målselva. The river is well known for its salmon, and forms the Målselv waterfall (Norwegian: Målselvfossen), which has been selected as Norway's national waterfall. The Målselva empties into the Malangen fjord north of Olsborg.

The highest point in the municipality is the 1,720.86-metre (5,645.9 ft) tall mountain Njunis. There are several other mountains in the municipality such as Istind, which is popular among hikers. There are many lakes such as Andsvatnet, Finnfjordvatnet, Rostojávri, Lille Rostavatn, and Takvatnet. One of the rarest orchids in Europe, Lysiella oligantha (Norwegian: Sibirnattfiol), is found in Målselv. Øvre Dividal National Park (740 km^{2} or 290 sq mi) is located in the easternmost part of Målselv, near the border with Sweden.

Besides bordering Sweden to the east and the ocean (Malangen fjord) to the northwest, it borders Balsfjord Municipality and Storfjord Municipality to the north, Bardu Municipality to the south, and Sørreisa Municipality and Senja Municipality to the west.

=== Climate ===
Målselv has a boreal climate (Köppen climate classification: Dfc) with cold winters, and with spring and early summer as the driest season.

Målselv is fairly sheltered from the coastal weather, and has a somewhat inland climate. The all-time high 33.5 °C (92.3 °F) is from July 2018, while the warmest month on record at Bardufoss Airport is July 2014 with average daily high 23.4 °C (74.1 °F) and mean 17.7 °C (63.9 °F). The all-time low −38.1 °C (−36.6 °F) was recorded December 1978. The coldest month recorded is February 1966 with mean −18.1 °C (−0.6 °F) and average daily low −23 °C (−9 °F). Mean annual precipitation is 703 millimetres (27.7 in) at Bardufoss and only 282 millimetres (11.1 in) in the Divi valley, which sits at 282 m (925 ft) above sea level.

There is on average 93 days each winter with daily low −10 °C (14 °F) or colder, and 28 days with low −20 °C (−4 °F) or colder. The winter season sees on average 68 days with at least 50 centimetres (20 in) snow cover on the ground, 126 days with at least 25 centimetres (9.8 in) snow cover, and 179 days with at least 5 centimetres (2.0 in) snow cover. In the warm season there is on average 116 days each year when the daily average high reaches 10 °C (50 °F) or warmer and 22 days with daily average high above 20 °C (68 °F). Precipitation is fairly moderate, there is on average 75 days per year with at least 3 millimetres (0.12 in) precipitation and 15 days per year with at least 10 millimetres (0.39 in) precipitation. This is based on data from Met.no with 1971–2000 as base period. The average date for last overnight freeze (below 0 °C (32 °F)) in spring is 20 May and the average date for first overnight freeze in autumn is 4 September (1981-2010 average) giving an average frost-free season of 106 days.

Climate data for Bardufoss 1991-2020 (76 m, extremes 1940-2025)
Month	Jan	Feb	Mar	Apr	May	Jun	Jul	Aug	Sep	Oct	Nov	Dec	Year
Record high °C (°F)	8.9 (48.0)	9.5 (49.1)	11.9 (53.4)	17.5 (63.5)	27.7 (81.9)	31.4 (88.5)	33.5 (92.3)	32.2 (90.0)	24.8 (76.6)	20 (68)	12.6 (54.7)	10.1 (50.2)	33.5 (92.3)
Mean daily maximum °C (°F)	−4.1 (24.6)	−3.5 (25.7)	0.4 (32.7)	4.9 (40.8)	10.1 (50.2)	14.9 (58.8)	18.2 (64.8)	16.7 (62.1)	11.9 (53.4)	4.6 (40.3)	−0.5 (31.1)	−2.7 (27.1)	5.9 (42.6)
Daily mean °C (°F)	−9.7 (14.5)	−9.1 (15.6)	−5.1 (22.8)	0.6 (33.1)	6 (43)	10.7 (51.3)	13.7 (56.7)	12.3 (54.1)	7.4 (45.3)	0.8 (33.4)	−4.7 (23.5)	−7.8 (18.0)	1.3 (34.3)
Mean daily minimum °C (°F)	−13.1 (8.4)	−12.6 (9.3)	−9.3 (15.3)	−3.8 (25.2)	1.8 (35.2)	6.9 (44.4)	9.7 (49.5)	8.1 (46.6)	3.9 (39.0)	−2.2 (28.0)	−8.1 (17.4)	−11.3 (11.7)	−2.5 (27.5)
Record low °C (°F)	−36.2 (−33.2)	−34.8 (−30.6)	−31.7 (−25.1)	−25.1 (−13.2)	−11.2 (11.8)	−2 (28)	0.6 (33.1)	−4 (25)	−12.4 (9.7)	−25.5 (−13.9)	−29.8 (−21.6)	−38.1 (−36.6)	−38.1 (−36.6)
Average precipitation mm (inches)	68.9 (2.71)	58.5 (2.30)	62.4 (2.46)	34.2 (1.35)	34.4 (1.35)	45.5 (1.79)	62.7 (2.47)	64.5 (2.54)	71.4 (2.81)	72 (2.8)	56.4 (2.22)	72.5 (2.85)	703.4 (27.65)
Average precipitation days (≥ 1 mm)	12	11	11	9	9	9	11	11	13	13	11	13	133
Source: NOAA

Climate data for Bardufoss 1961–90 (76 m)
Month	Jan	Feb	Mar	Apr	May	Jun	Jul	Aug	Sep	Oct	Nov	Dec	Year
Mean daily maximum °C (°F)	−5.9 (21.4)	−4.5 (23.9)	−0.4 (31.3)	3.8 (38.8)	9.3 (48.7)	14.8 (58.6)	17.4 (63.3)	15.8 (60.4)	10.5 (50.9)	4.3 (39.7)	−1.7 (28.9)	−4.7 (23.5)	4.9 (40.8)
Daily mean °C (°F)	−10.4 (13.3)	−8.9 (16.0)	−5.4 (22.3)	−0.2 (31.6)	5.6 (42.1)	10.5 (50.9)	13.0 (55.4)	11.5 (52.7)	6.3 (43.3)	0.9 (33.6)	−5.5 (22.1)	−8.9 (16.0)	0.7 (33.3)
Mean daily minimum °C (°F)	−15.1 (4.8)	−13.7 (7.3)	−10.9 (12.4)	−5.1 (22.8)	1.1 (34.0)	6.2 (43.2)	8.8 (47.8)	6.9 (44.4)	2.5 (36.5)	−2.5 (27.5)	−9.4 (15.1)	−13.6 (7.5)	−3.7 (25.3)
Average precipitation mm (inches)	66 (2.6)	58 (2.3)	40 (1.6)	33 (1.3)	24 (0.9)	38 (1.5)	57 (2.2)	63 (2.5)	64 (2.5)	77 (3.0)	64 (2.5)	68 (2.7)	652 (25.7)
Average precipitation days (≥ 1 mm)	11.2	11.4	9.3	7.8	6.8	8.9	11.7	12.7	12.9	13.7	12.0	12.5	130.9
Source: Norwegian Meteorological Institute

== Media gallery ==
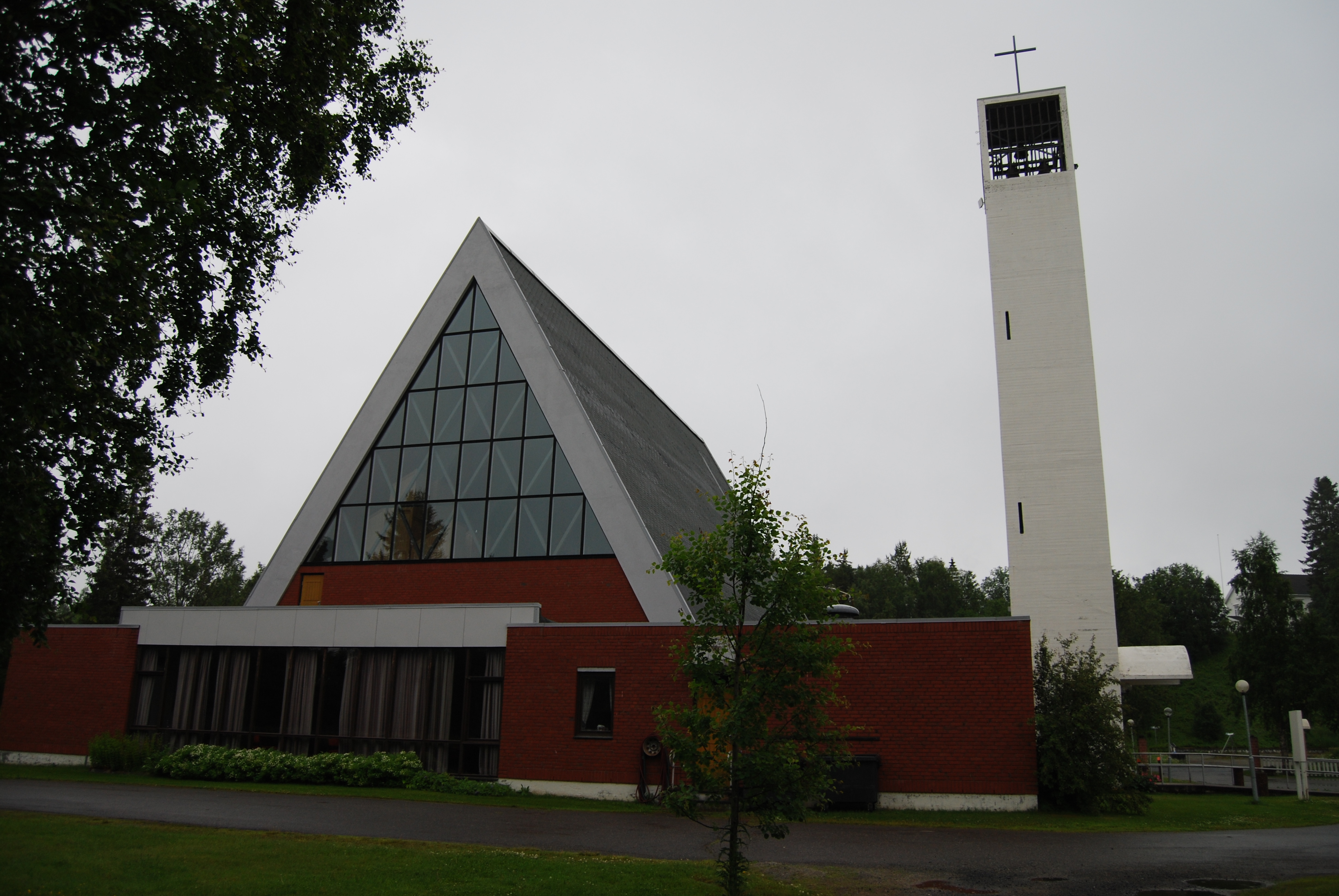
Målselv kirke

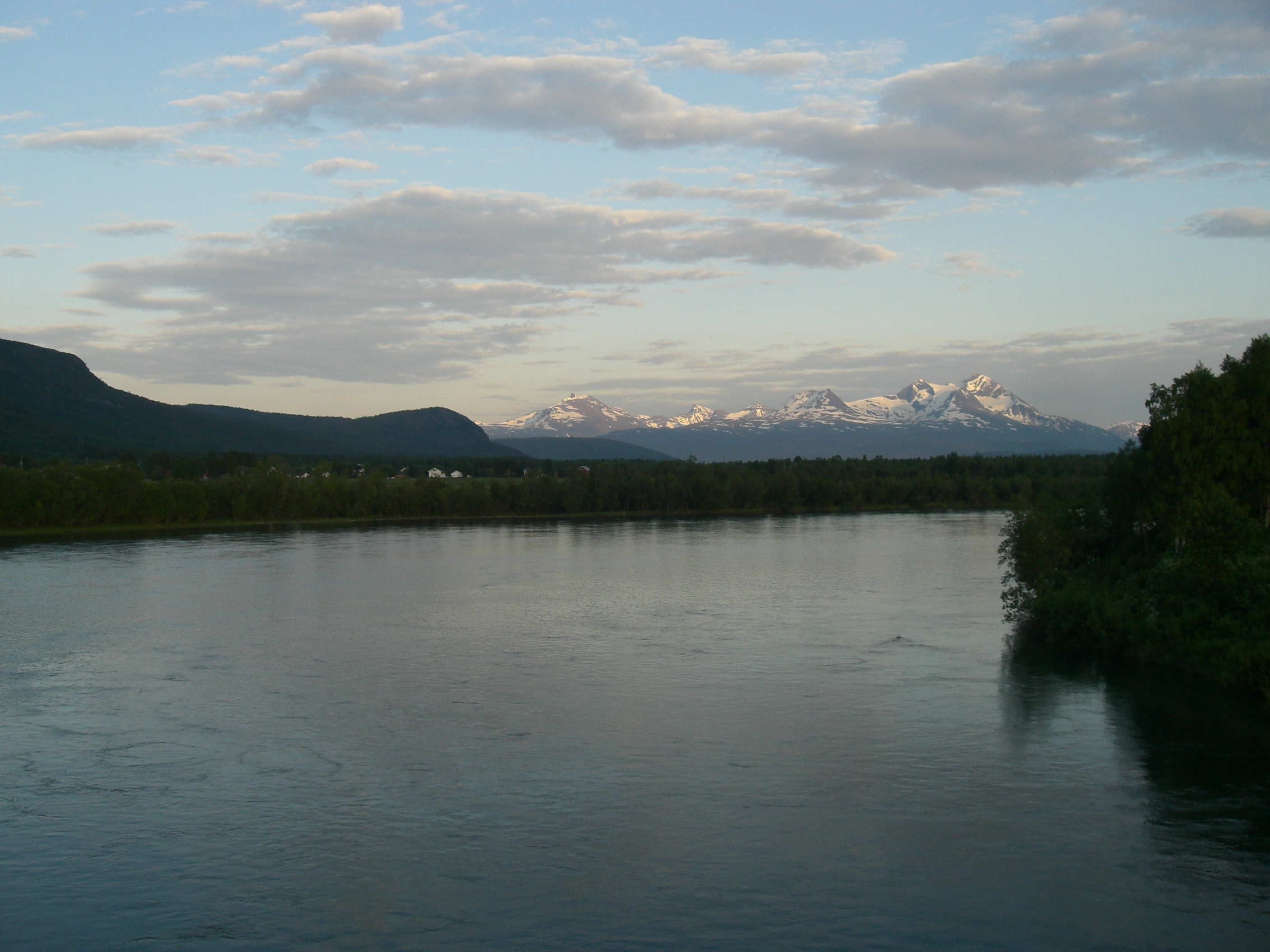
Målselv river and valley

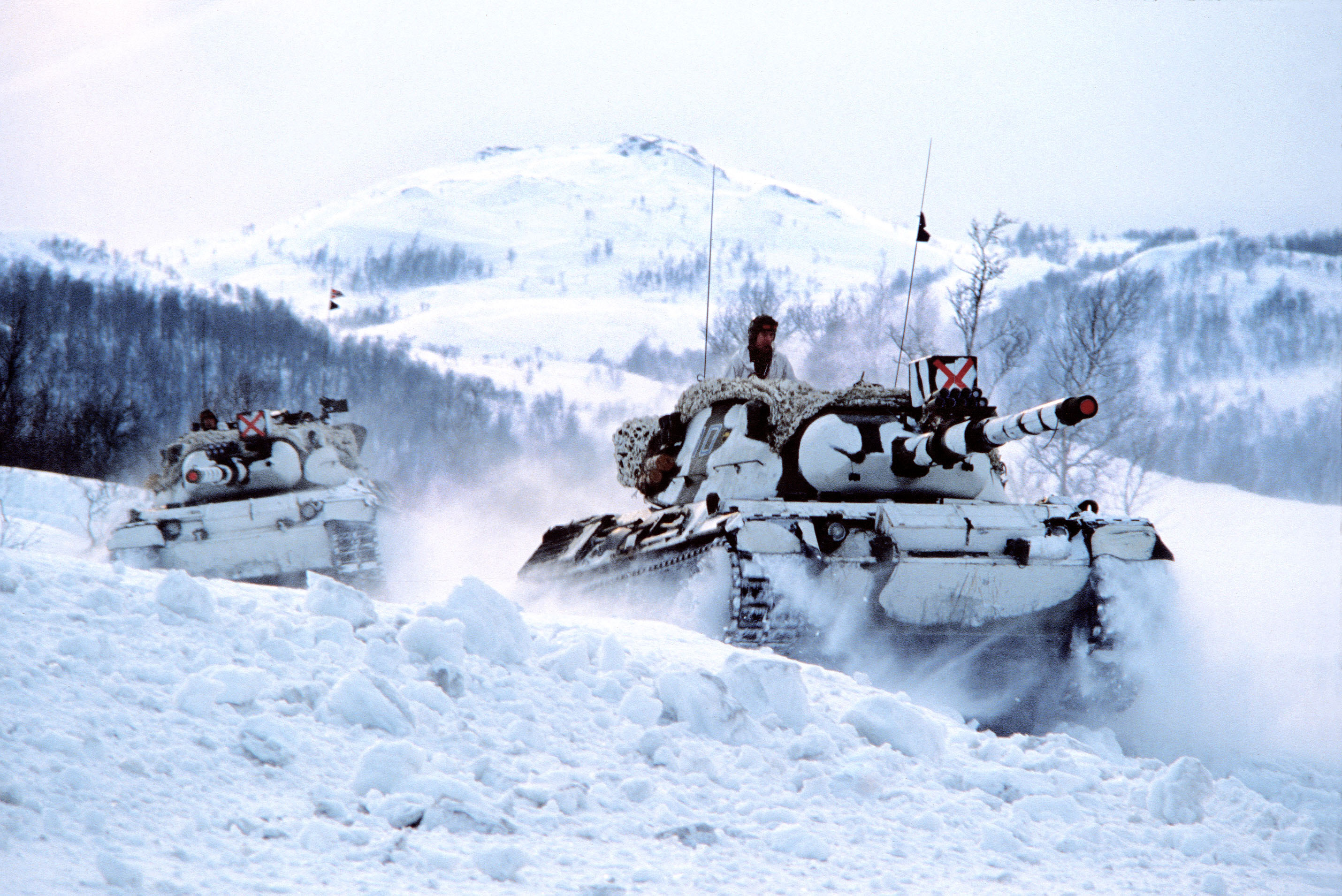
The Norwegian Armed Forces has a long history in Målselv

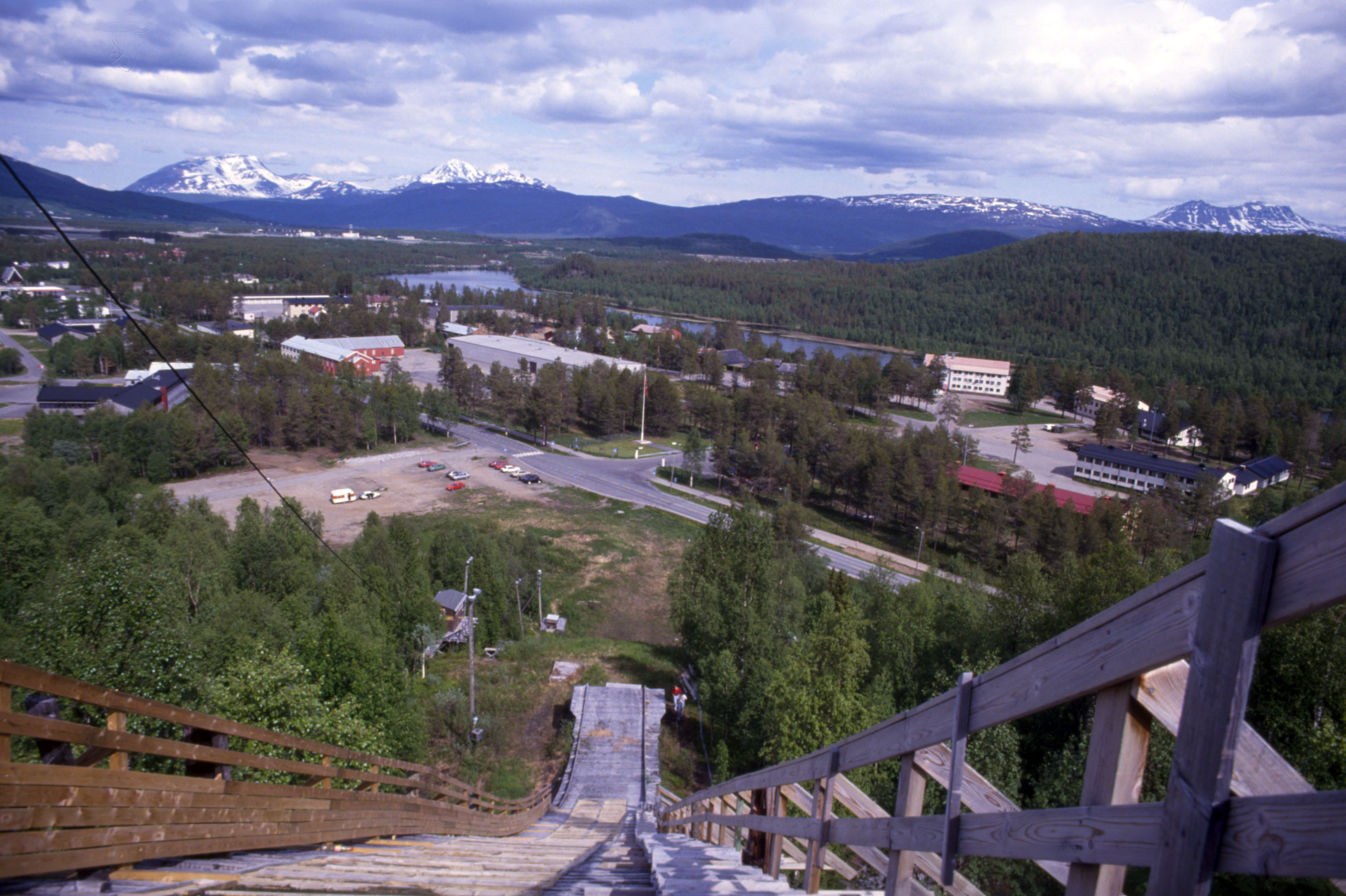
Heggelia in Målselv

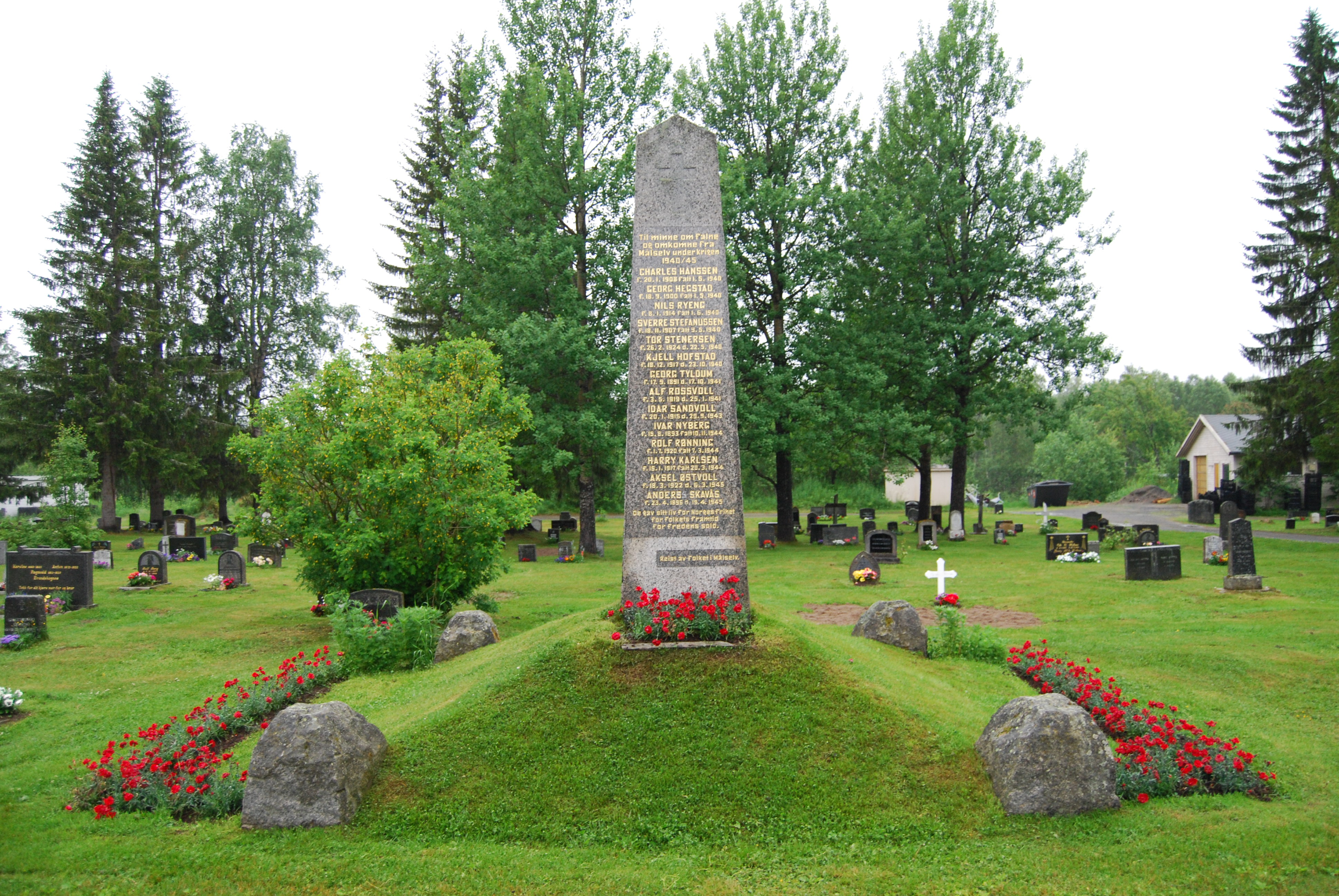
Memorial for those killed during WW2 in Målselv

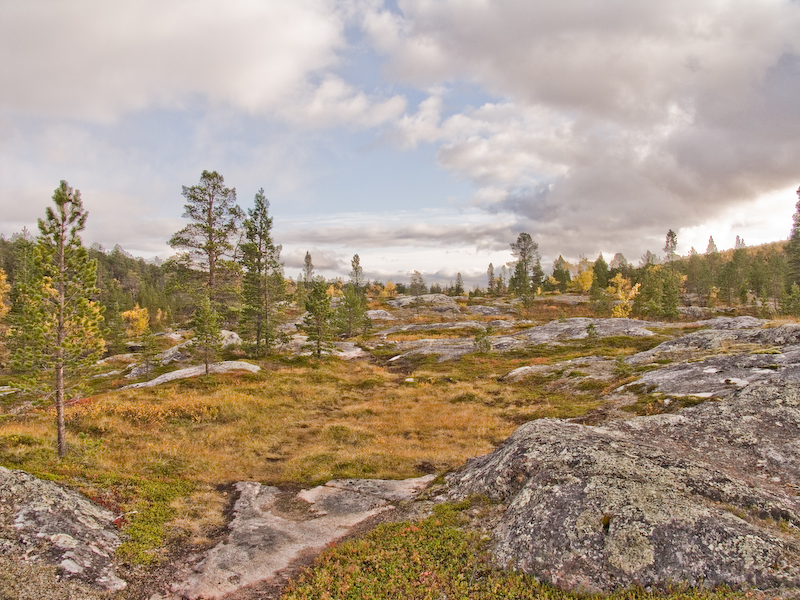
Øvre Dividal national park

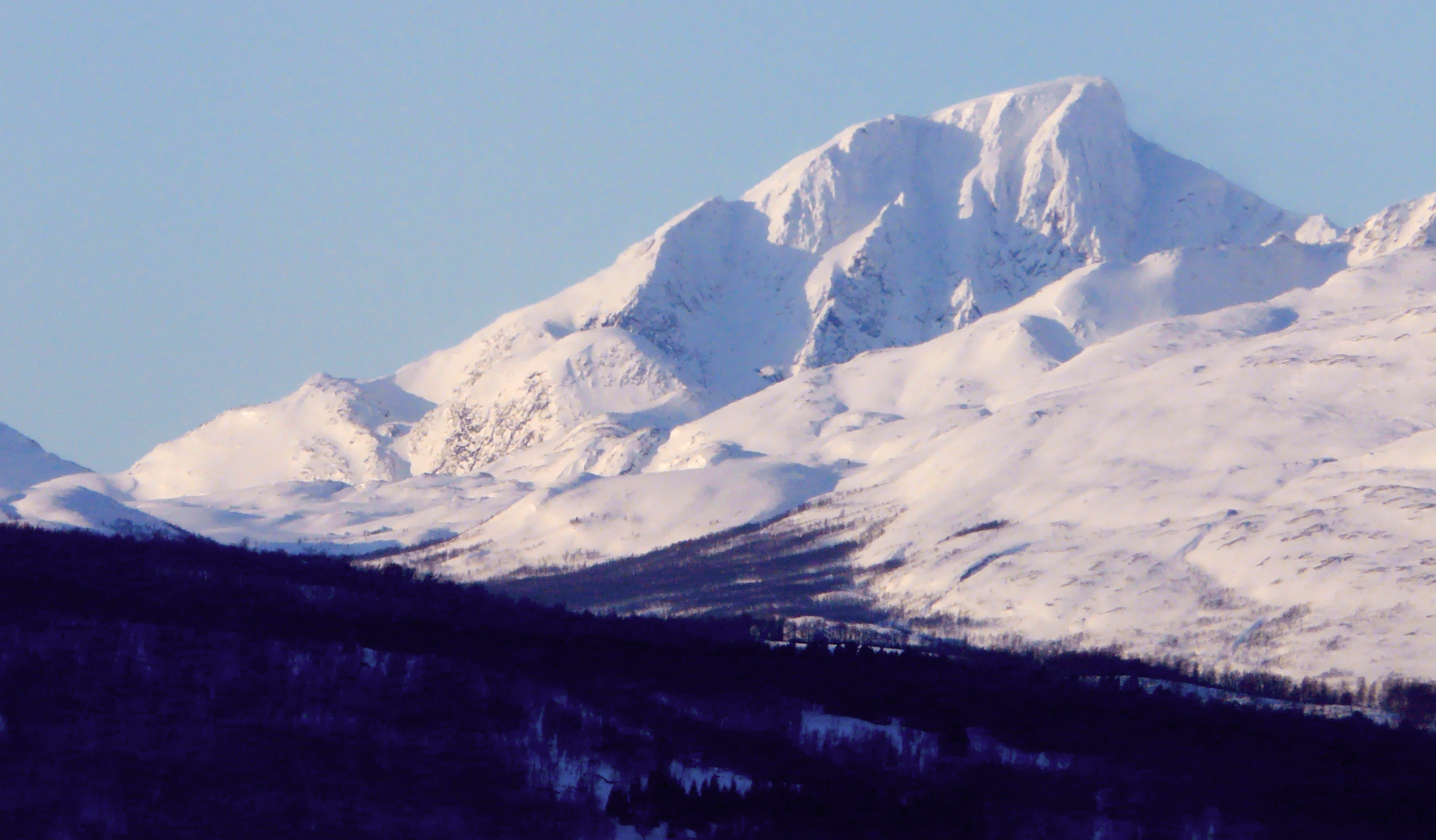
Blåtindan mountain

== Government ==
Målselv Municipality is responsible for primary education (through 10th grade), outpatient health services, senior citizen services, welfare and other social services, zoning, economic development, and municipal roads and utilities. The municipality is governed by a municipal council of directly elected representatives. The mayor is indirectly elected by a vote of the municipal council. The municipality is under the jurisdiction of the Nord-Troms og Senja District Court and the Hålogaland Court of Appeal.

=== Municipal council ===
The municipal council (Kommunestyre) of Målselv Municipality is made up of 23 representatives that are elected to four-year terms. The tables below show the current and historical composition of the council by political party.

Målselv kommunestyre 2023–2027
Party name (in Norwegian)	Number of representatives
Labour Party (Arbeiderpartiet)	8
Progress Party (Fremskrittspartiet)	2
Conservative Party (Høyre)	5
Red Party (Rødt)	1
Centre Party (Senterpartiet)	5
Socialist Left Party (Sosialistisk Venstreparti)	1
Liberal Party (Venstre)	1
Total number of members:	23

Målselv kommunestyre 2019–2023
Party name (in Norwegian)	Number of representatives
Labour Party (Arbeiderpartiet)	7
Progress Party (Fremskrittspartiet)	1
Conservative Party (Høyre)	2
Red Party (Rødt)	1
Centre Party (Senterpartiet)	10
Socialist Left Party (Sosialistisk Venstreparti)	1
Liberal Party (Venstre)	1
Total number of members:	23

Målselv kommunestyre 2015–2019
Party name (in Norwegian)	Number of representatives
Labour Party (Arbeiderpartiet)	11
Progress Party (Fremskrittspartiet)	2
Conservative Party (Høyre)	4
Centre Party (Senterpartiet)	4
Socialist Left Party (Sosialistisk Venstreparti)	1
Liberal Party (Venstre)	3
Total number of members:	25

Målselv kommunestyre 2011–2015
Party name (in Norwegian)	Number of representatives
Labour Party (Arbeiderpartiet)	10
Progress Party (Fremskrittspartiet)	3
Conservative Party (Høyre)	5
Centre Party (Senterpartiet)	3
Socialist Left Party (Sosialistisk Venstreparti)	1
Liberal Party (Venstre)	3
Total number of members:	25

Målselv kommunestyre 2007–2011
Party name (in Norwegian)	Number of representatives
Labour Party (Arbeiderpartiet)	13
Progress Party (Fremskrittspartiet)	5
Conservative Party (Høyre)	3
Centre Party (Senterpartiet)	4
Liberal Party (Venstre)	2
Joint list of the Red Electoral Alliance (Rød Valgallianse) and the Socialist Left Party (Sosialistisk Venstreparti)	2
Total number of members:	29

Målselv kommunestyre 2003–2007
Party name (in Norwegian)	Number of representatives
Labour Party (Arbeiderpartiet)	11
Progress Party (Fremskrittspartiet)	3
Conservative Party (Høyre)	4
The Democrats (Demokratene)	1
Centre Party (Senterpartiet)	4
Liberal Party (Venstre)	3
Joint list of the Red Electoral Alliance (Rød Valgallianse) and the Socialist Left Party (Sosialistisk Venstreparti)	3
Total number of members:	29

Målselv kommunestyre 1999–2003
Party name (in Norwegian)	Number of representatives
Labour Party (Arbeiderpartiet)	8
Progress Party (Fremskrittspartiet)	3
Conservative Party (Høyre)	6
Red Electoral Alliance (Rød Valgallianse)	1
Centre Party (Senterpartiet)	6
Liberal Party (Venstre)	5
Total number of members:	29

Målselv kommunestyre 1995–1999
Party name (in Norwegian)	Number of representatives
Labour Party (Arbeiderpartiet)	6
Progress Party (Fremskrittspartiet)	1
Conservative Party (Høyre)	5
Centre Party (Senterpartiet)	6
Socialist Left Party (Sosialistisk Venstreparti)	2
Liberal Party (Venstre)	9
Total number of members:	29

Målselv kommunestyre 1991–1995
Party name (in Norwegian)	Number of representatives
Labour Party (Arbeiderpartiet)	6
Conservative Party (Høyre)	5
Centre Party (Senterpartiet)	4
Socialist Left Party (Sosialistisk Venstreparti)	2
Liberal Party (Venstre)	8
Total number of members:	25

Målselv kommunestyre 1987–1991
Party name (in Norwegian)	Number of representatives
Labour Party (Arbeiderpartiet)	15
Conservative Party (Høyre)	10
Christian Democratic Party (Kristelig Folkeparti)	2
Centre Party (Senterpartiet)	6
Socialist Left Party (Sosialistisk Venstreparti)	2
Liberal Party (Venstre)	2
Total number of members:	37

Målselv kommunestyre 1983–1987
Party name (in Norwegian)	Number of representatives
Labour Party (Arbeiderpartiet)	15
Conservative Party (Høyre)	13
Christian Democratic Party (Kristelig Folkeparti)	1
Centre Party (Senterpartiet)	4
Socialist Left Party (Sosialistisk Venstreparti)	2
Liberal Party (Venstre)	2
Total number of members:	37

Målselv kommunestyre 1979–1983
Party name (in Norwegian)	Number of representatives
Labour Party (Arbeiderpartiet)	13
Conservative Party (Høyre)	12
Christian Democratic Party (Kristelig Folkeparti)	2
Centre Party (Senterpartiet)	6
Socialist Left Party (Sosialistisk Venstreparti)	2
Liberal Party (Venstre)	2
Total number of members:	37

Målselv kommunestyre 1975–1979
Party name (in Norwegian)	Number of representatives
Labour Party (Arbeiderpartiet)	16
Conservative Party (Høyre)	9
Christian Democratic Party (Kristelig Folkeparti)	2
Centre Party (Senterpartiet)	7
Socialist Left Party (Sosialistisk Venstreparti)	1
Liberal Party (Venstre)	2
Total number of members:	37

Målselv kommunestyre 1971–1975
Party name (in Norwegian)	Number of representatives
Labour Party (Arbeiderpartiet)	17
Conservative Party (Høyre)	7
Centre Party (Senterpartiet)	10
Liberal Party (Venstre)	3
Total number of members:	37

Målselv kommunestyre 1967–1971
Party name (in Norwegian)	Number of representatives
Labour Party (Arbeiderpartiet)	18
Conservative Party (Høyre)	8
Centre Party (Senterpartiet)	8
Liberal Party (Venstre)	3
Total number of members:	37

Målselv kommunestyre 1963–1967
Party name (in Norwegian)	Number of representatives
Labour Party (Arbeiderpartiet)	18
Conservative Party (Høyre)	7
Centre Party (Senterpartiet)	8
Liberal Party (Venstre)	3
Local List(s) (Lokale lister)	1
Total number of members:	37

Målselv herredsstyre 1959–1963
Party name (in Norwegian)	Number of representatives
Labour Party (Arbeiderpartiet)	9
Local List(s) (Lokale lister)	18
Total number of members:	27

Målselv herredsstyre 1955–1959
Party name (in Norwegian)	Number of representatives
Labour Party (Arbeiderpartiet)	12
Local List(s) (Lokale lister)	15
Total number of members:	27

Målselv herredsstyre 1951–1955
Party name (in Norwegian)	Number of representatives
Labour Party (Arbeiderpartiet)	11
Liberal Party (Venstre)	6
Local List(s) (Lokale lister)	3
Total number of members:	20

Målselv herredsstyre 1947–1951
Party name (in Norwegian)	Number of representatives
Labour Party (Arbeiderpartiet)	9
Local List(s) (Lokale lister)	11
Total number of members:	20

Målselv herredsstyre 1945–1947
Party name (in Norwegian)	Number of representatives
Labour Party (Arbeiderpartiet)	10
Local List(s) (Lokale lister)	10
Total number of members:	20

Målselv herredsstyre 1937–1941*
Party name (in Norwegian)	Number of representatives
Labour Party (Arbeiderpartiet)	6
Joint List(s) of Non-Socialist Parties (Borgerlige Felleslister)	5
Local List(s) (Lokale lister)	3
Workers and farmers list (Arbeider- og bondelisten)	6
Total number of members:	20
Note: Due to the German occupation of Norway during World War II, no elections were held for new municipal councils until after the war ended in 1945.

=== Mayors ===
The mayor (Norwegian: ordfører) of Målselv Municipality is the political leader of the municipality and the chairperson of the municipal council. Here is a list of people who have held this position:

- 1848–1852: Ole Pedersen Krogseng
- 1852–1856: Erik Arntsen Sandeggen
- 1857–1859: Ole Pedersen Krogseng
- 1859–1860: Tollef Olsen Fagerlidal
- 1861–1871: Erik Arntsen Sandeggen
- 1871–1872: Monrad Hay
- 1873–1876: Lars Iversen Fagerlidal
- 1877–1877: Nikolai Martens
- 1878–1882: Tollef Olsen Moen
- 1883–1890: Ole Tollefsen Fagerlidal
- 1891–1894: Monrad Hay
- 1895–1910: Erik Myre
- 1911–1913: Rønning Tollefsen
- 1913–1915: Erik Myre
- 1915–1916: P. Steingrimsen
- 1917–1919: Rønning Tollefsen
- 1920–1922: Daniel Emil Jachwitz (LL)
- 1923–1925: John Tråsdahl (Bp)
- 1926–1932: Meier Nilsen Foshaug
- 1932–1935: John Tråsdahl (Bp)
- 1935–1940: Nordang J.M. Rossvoll
- 1941–1945: Tøllef Sigvardt Tollefsen
- 1946–1948: Jens Sommerbakk (Ap)
- 1948–1951: Jens Fagerhaug (LL)
- 1951–1955: Jens Sommerbakk (Ap)
- 1956–1959: Karl Byberg (V)
- 1959–1963: Arne Sandnes (H)
- 1964–1969: Hans Solberg (Ap)
- 1969–1971: Arne Sandnes (H)
- 1971–1979: Ragnvald M. Myrvang (Ap)
- 1979–1987: Kåre Finbakken (H)
- 1987–1990: Kristian Eldnes (Ap)
- 1990–1993: Vidkunn Haugli (V)
- 1993–1995: Helge Paulsen (Ap)
- 1995–2003: Lars Nymo (Sp)
- 2003–2011: Viggo Fossum (Ap)
- 2011–2015: Helene Rognli (H)
- 2015–2019: Nils Foshaug (Ap)
- 2019–2023: Bengt-Magne Luneng (Sp)
- 2023–present: Martin Nymo (H)

== Economy ==
A local newspaper, Nye Troms, covering Målselv, Bardu, and Balsfjord, has its main office in the Olsborg/Moen area. The municipality administration is located at Moen, about 2 kilometres (1.2 mi) east of Olsborg.

Further south along European route E6 is the Bardufoss region, which encompasses the local communities Andselv, Andslimoen, and Heggelia, the latter including the Norwegian army's 6th division. Near Andselv is the Bardufoss Airport and the Bardufoss Air Station of the Royal Norwegian Air Force, including the 337th and 339th Air Force helicopter squadrons. Målselv municipality, together with neighbouring Bardu, has the largest concentration of army bases in the country.

Moving further up the valley, another local community is Rundhaug, and moving eastwards, closer to Øvre Dividal National Park, is the community of Øverbygd, housing two more sub-communities Skjold and Holt. The former also houses the Skjold base for mechanized infantry and combat engineers.

Tourism is a growing industry in Målselv, with the opening of Målselv Fjellandsby, an alpine ski destination. Målselv is also home to Målselvfossen, Norway's national waterfall and a mecca for salmon fishermen. Bardufoss concentration camp was located here during World War II.

Arne Berggren established a film production hub, Shuuto Arctic, at FilmCamp Nord, a former military base in Målselv. Shuuto Arctic's first production was The River (2017) and was followed by Outlier (2020).

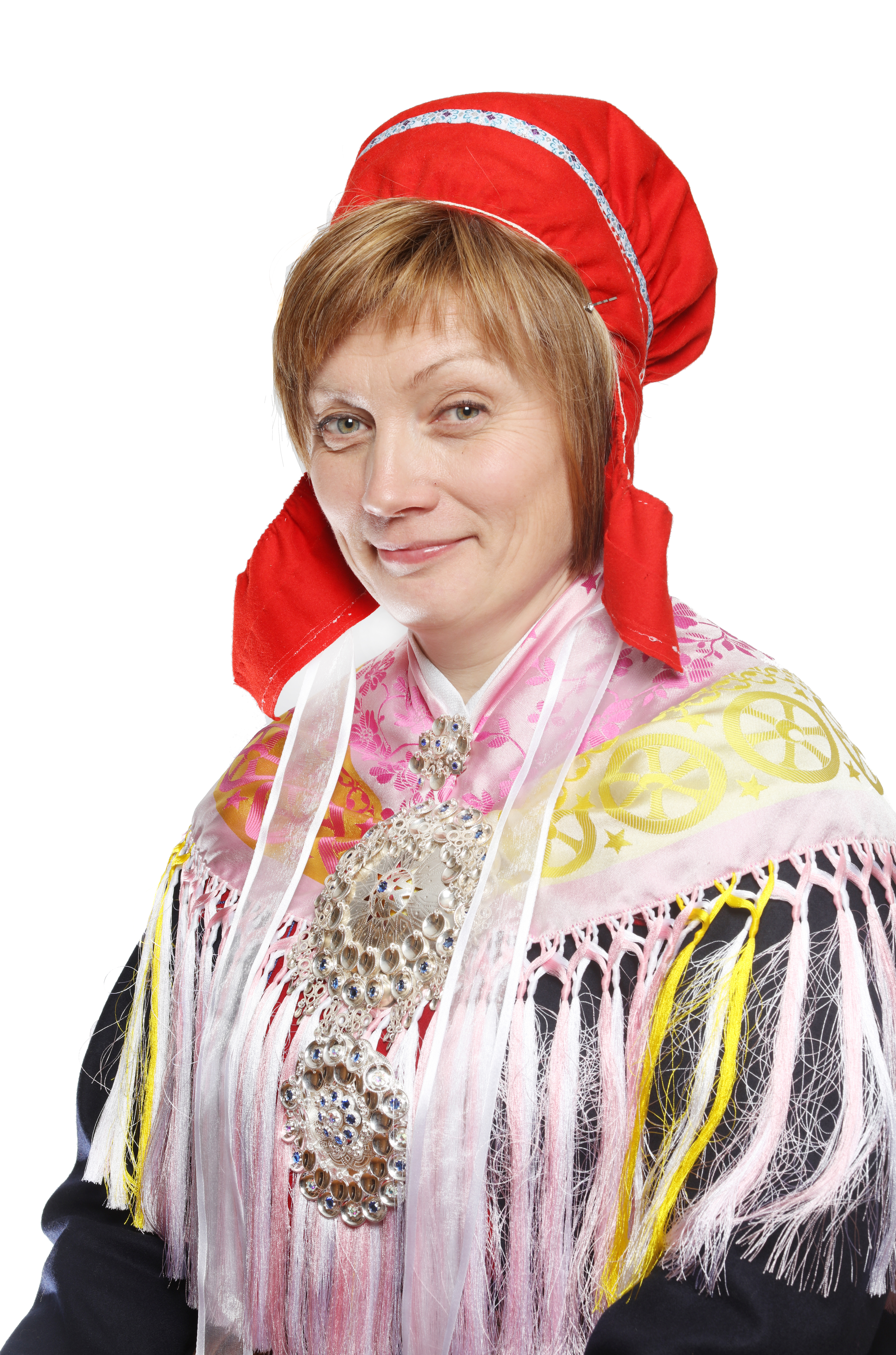
Karen Anette Anti, 2017

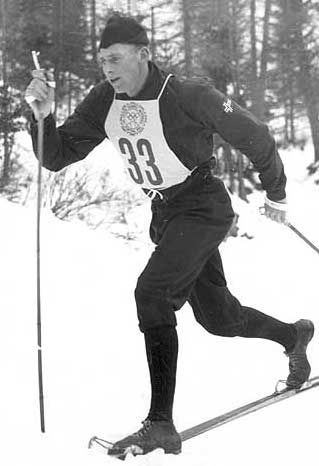
Sverre Stenersen, 1956

== Notable people ==
- Meyer Foshaug (1868 in Foshaug – 1955), a farmer and politician
- Johannes Martens (1870 in Målselv – 1938), a newspaper editor
- Erling Mossige (1907 in Målselv – 1997), a jurist and banker
- Aase Nordmo Løvberg (1923 in Målselv – 2013), an opera soprano
- William Engseth (born 1933 in Målselv), a Norwegian politician and President of the Norwegian Olympic Committee
- Viggo Fossum (1949–2019), a Norwegian politician who was Mayor of Målselv from 2003 to 2011
- Svein Nymo (1953 in Målselv – 2014), a violinist and composer
- Geir Pollen (born 1953 in Målselv), a poet, novelist, and translator
- Karen Anette Anti (born 1972), a Norwegian Sami politician
- Ragnhild Furebotten (born 1979), a fiddler, folk musician, and composer who lives in Målselv
- Ingerid Stenvold (born 1977), a television presenter and former cross-country skier

=== Sport ===
- Jostein Nordmoe (1895 in Målselv – 1965), a Canadian skier who competed at the 1932 Winter Olympics
- Sverre Stenersen (1926 in Målselv – 2005), a Norwegian Nordic combined skier who was a bronze medallist at the 1952 Winter Olympics and gold medallist at the 1956 Winter Olympics
- Odd Brandsegg (born 1948 in Målselv), a Swedish former ski jumper
- Erik Valnes (born 1996), a cross-country skier
