= Heggelia =

Neighborhood in the town of Bardufoss, Norway

- Neighborhood in Bardufoss
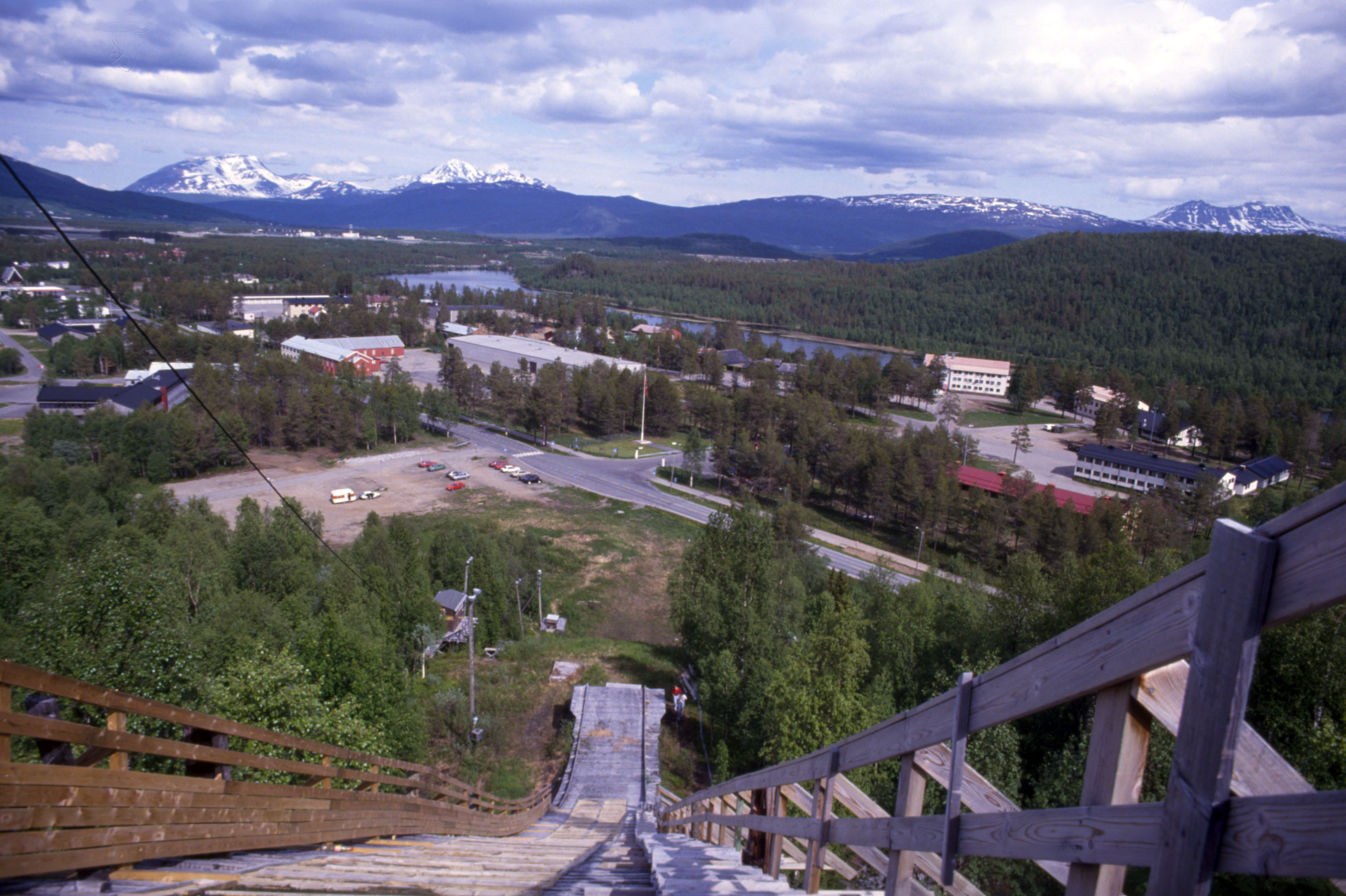
- View of the area
- Interactive map of Heggelia
- Location within Troms Location within Norway
- Coordinates: 69°02′40″N 18°30′37″E
- Country: Norway
- Region: Northern Norway
- County: Troms
- District: Midt-Troms
- Municipality: Målselv Municipality

Area
  - Total: 1.61 km^{2} (0.62 sq mi)
- Elevation: 78 m (256 ft)

Population (2023)
  - Total: 966
  - Density: 600/km^{2} (1,600/sq mi)
- Time zone: UTC+01:00 (CET)
  - Summer (DST): UTC+02:00 (CEST)
- Post Code: 9325 Bardufoss

Heggelia is a neighborhood within the town of Bardufoss in Målselv Municipality in Troms county, Norway. The area is located along the river Barduelva and the European route E6 highway about 2.5 km (1.6 mi) south of Andselv and the Bardufoss Airport. Heggelia makes up the southern part of the town of Bardufoss.

The 1.61-square-kilometre (400-acre) area has a population (2023) of 966 and a population density of 600 inhabitants per square kilometre (1,600/sq mi).

In 2021, the three neighboring villages of Andselv, Andslimoen, and Heggelia were merged and designated as the new town of Bardufoss.
