= Malangen (fjord) =

Fjord in Troms, Norway

Malangen (Norwegian); Málatvuotna (Northern Sami)
- Malangsfjorden
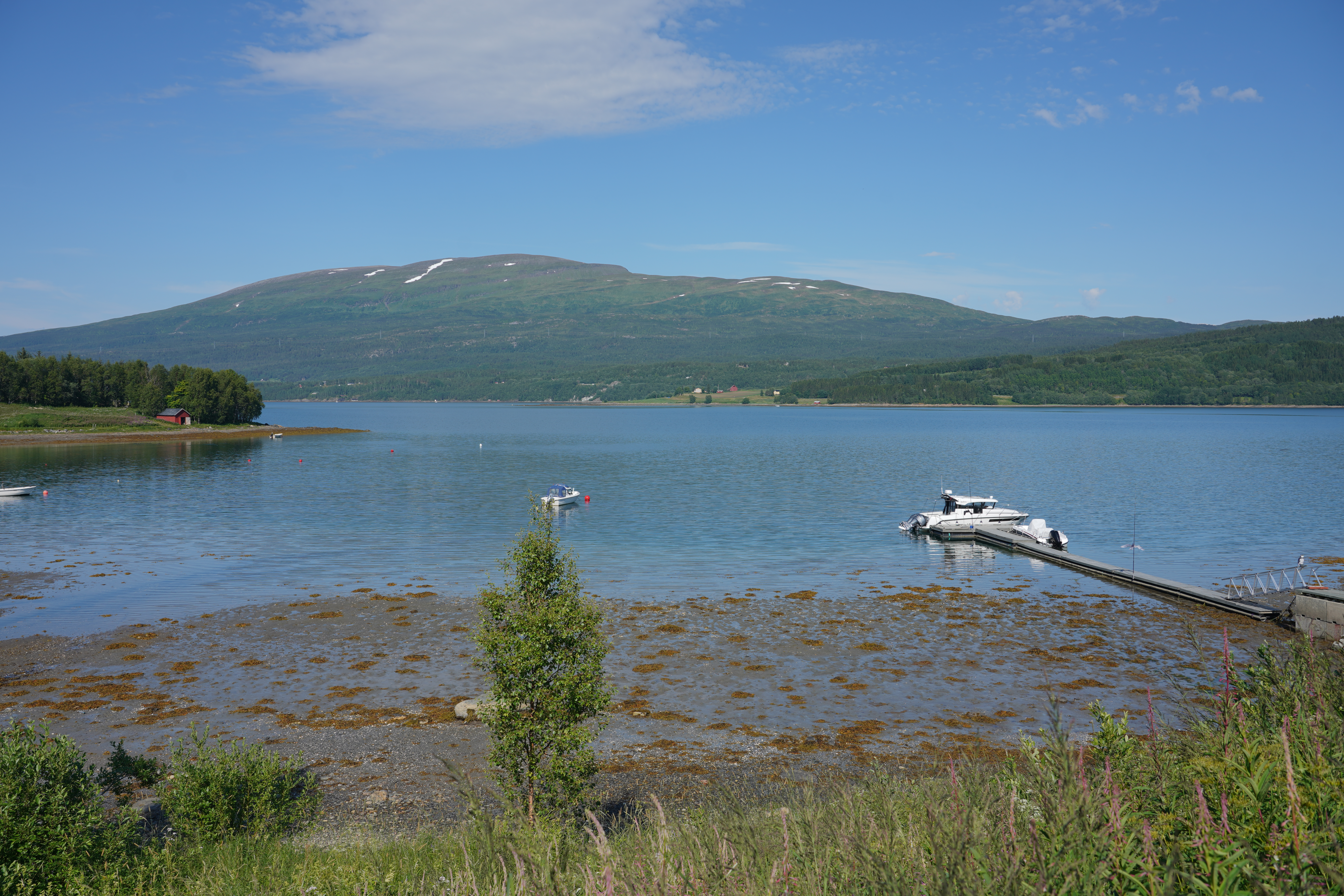
- View of the fjord
- Interactive map of the fjord
- Location: Troms county, Norway
- Coordinates: 69.4171°N 18.4273°E
- Type: Fjord
- Basin countries: Norway
- Max. length: 60 kilometres (37 mi)
- Max. width: 7 kilometres (4.3 mi)

Malangen (Norwegian) or Málatvuotna (Northern Sami) (also: Norwegian: Malangsfjorden; Kven: Malankivuono) is a fjord in Troms county, Norway. The 60-kilometre (37 mi) long fjord runs through the municipalities of Balsfjord, Målselv, Senja, and Tromsø. The fjord runs southeast between the islands of Senja and Kvaløya and further into the mainland along the border between Balsfjord and Senja municipalities.

The fjord stretches from Hekkingen Lighthouse off the coast of the island of Senja to the village of Nordfjordbotn. In the inner part of the fjord, it branches out into four smaller fjords: Nordfjorden, Aursfjorden, Målselvfjorden, and Rossfjorden. The Målselva river feeds into the Målselvfjorden. There are several larger villages along the coast of the fjord, including Mortenhals, Mestervik, and Rossfjordstraumen.

== Etymology ==
The name Malangen comes from the old name of the fjord (Old Norse: Malangr). The first element is mál which comes from the Old High German word malaha which means "bag" or "leather bag" which may refer to the baggy shape of the fjord. The same word mál is probably also the origin of the name of the Målselva, the big river that enters the fjord from the Målselvdalen and Bardudalen valleys (the neighboring Målselv Municipality has a similar etymology). The last element of the name is angr which means "inlet" or "narrow fjord".

== History ==
Historically, the fjord along with the area around it has had a historical importance as the northern boundary for Norwegian settlement during the Middle Ages. In the 13th century, King Haakon IV of Norway gave some people from Bjarmaland some land around the Malangen fjord on which to live. From 1871 until 1964, the area surrounding much of the fjord was part of Malangen Municipality, a municipality that was named after the fjord.

== See also ==
- List of Norwegian fjords
