= Målselvdalen =

Valley in Troms, Norway

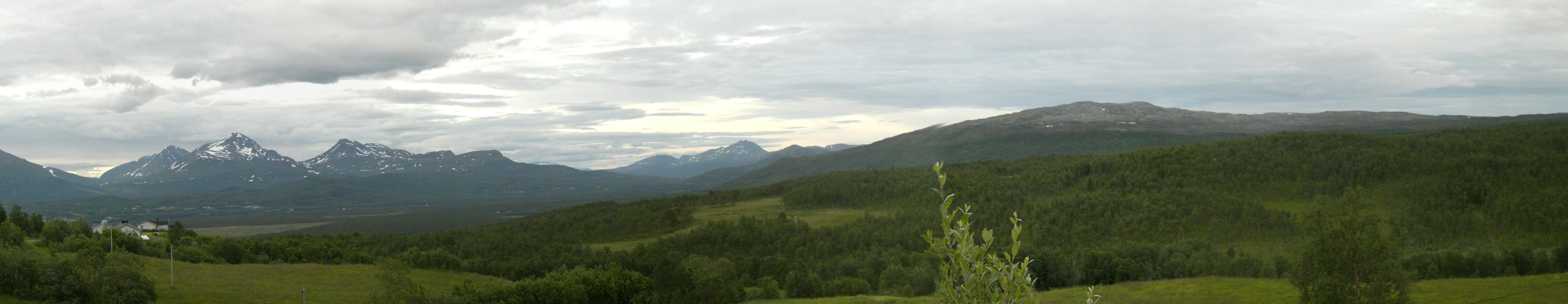
- View of Målselva river valley
- Length: 60 km (37 mi)
- Width: 10 km (6.2 mi)

Geology
- Type: River valley

Geography
- Location: Troms, Norway
- Population centers: Bardufoss, Andselv, Skjold
- Coordinates: 69.0278°N 18.7887°E

Location
- Interactive map of the valley

Målselvdalen is the largest valley in Troms county, Norway. The river is located in Målselv Municipality. The river Målselva runs through the valley, ending at the Målselvfjorden (an arm off the main Malangen fjord). The 60-kilometre (37 mi) long valley runs to the west and then to the north, following the path of the river. Most of the residents of Målselv Municipality live in this valley.

== History ==
With a landscape reminiscent of that of the Østerdalen valley, the valley was settled in the late eighteenth century by farmers from the Østerdalen and Gudbrandsdalen valleys to the south. The bailiff in the district, Jens Holmboe, was instrumental in settling this region.
