= Andselv =

Neighborhood in the town of Bardufoss, Norway

- Neighborhood in Bardufoss
- Interactive map of Andselv
- Location within Troms Location within Norway
- Coordinates: 69.0734°N 18.5308°E
- Country: Norway
- Region: Northern Norway
- County: Troms
- District: Midt-Troms
- Municipality: Målselv Municipality

Area
  - Total: 1.18 km^{2} (0.46 sq mi)
- Elevation: 76 m (249 ft)

Population (2023)
  - Total: 1,233
  - Density: 1,045/km^{2} (2,710/sq mi)
- Time zone: UTC+01:00 (CET)
  - Summer (DST): UTC+02:00 (CEST)
- Post Code: 9325 Bardufoss

Andselv is a neighborhood within the town of Bardufoss in Målselv Municipality in Troms county, Norway. The village lies along the Andselva river, just north of Bardufoss Airport. The area is located along the European route E6 highway about 2 km (1.2 mi) north of the village of Heggelia and 3.5 km (2.2 mi) south of the village of Andslimoen. Andselv makes up the central part of the town of Bardufoss.

The 1.18-square-kilometre (290-acre) area has a population (2023) of 1,233 and a population density of 1,045 inhabitants per square kilometre (2,710/sq mi).

In 2021, the three neighboring villages of Andselv, Andslimoen, and Heggelia were merged and designated as the new town of Bardufoss.
