= Målselva =

River in Troms, Norway

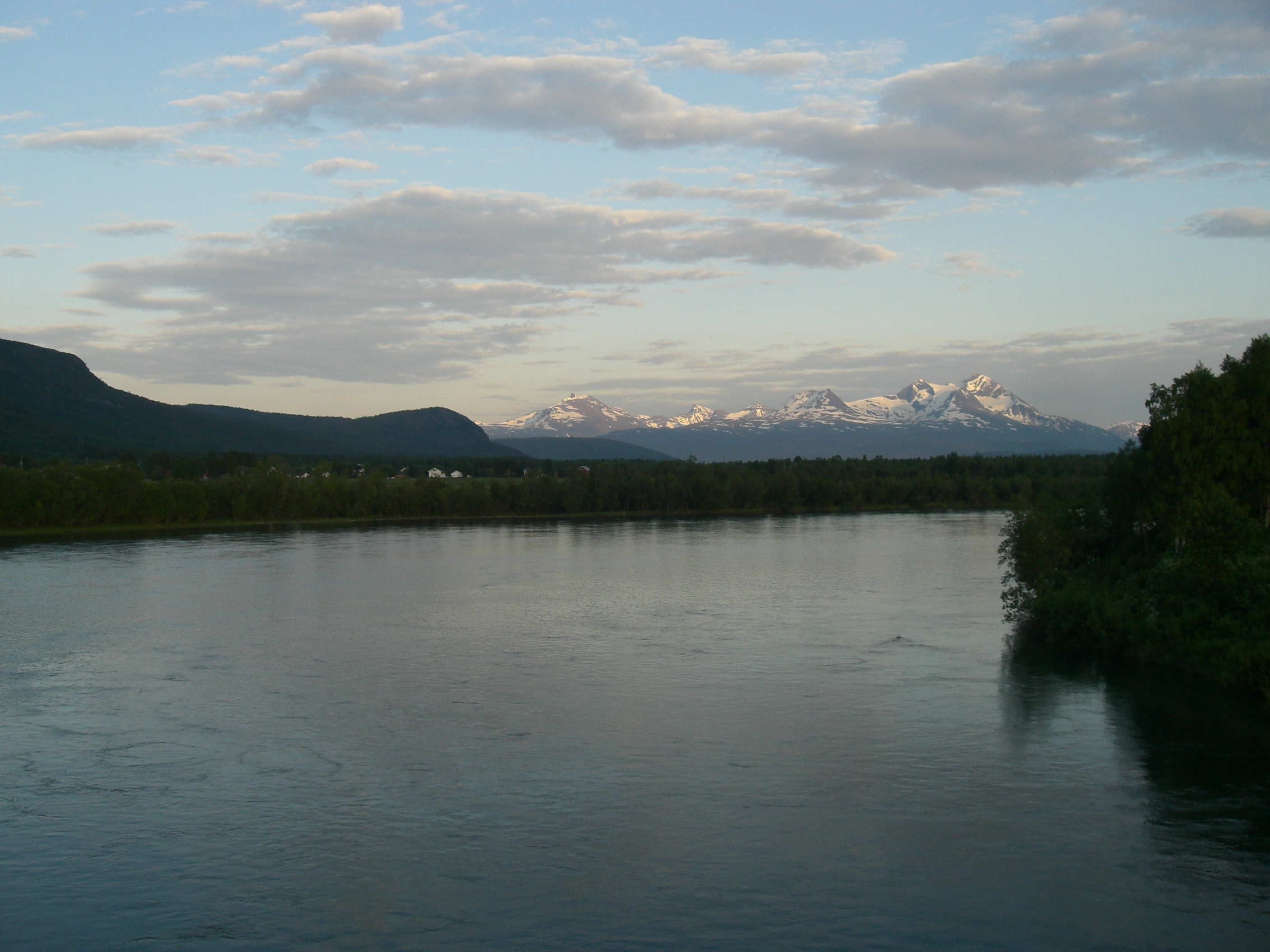
- View of the Målselva river
- Interactive map of the river

Location
- Country: Norway
- County: Troms
- Municipalities: Målselv Municipality

Physical characteristics
- Source: Lille Rostavatnet
  - location: Rostadnes, Målselv, Troms
  - coordinates: 69.0218°N 19.5148°E
  - elevation: 102 metres (335 ft)
- Mouth: Malangen fjord
  - location: Målsnes, Målselv, Troms
  - coordinates: 69.3065°N 18.5248°E
  - elevation: 0 metres (0 ft)
- Length: 140 km (87 mi)
- Basin size: 6,144 km^{2} (2,372 sq mi)

Basin features
- River system: Målselvvassdraget
- Tributaries
  - left: Barduelva

The Målselva is a river in Målselv Municipality in Troms county, Norway. The 140-kilometre (87 mi) long river flows through the Målselv valley (Målselvdalen) and then empties into the Målselvfjorden, an arm of the Malangen fjord. The municipality and the valley through which the river runs are both named after the river. The river is common fishing grounds for locals.

The smaller rivers Divielva, Tamokelva, and Rostaelva converge near the Lille Rostavatnet lake to form the Målselva river. Later, the river Barduelva joins it near Fossmoen and Bardufoss. The river drains a watershed of 6,144 square kilometres (2,372 sq mi). Målselva contains four hydropower stations throughout its catchment - the Målselva catchment. The Målselva river passes by the main villages of Bardufoss, Andselv, and Skjold, and has smaller settlements like Kjerresnes, Karlstad and Rossvoll near its drainage into the fjord.

Kjerresnes has an ice bridge formed over the river during the winter, which shortens the travel to other settlements like Finnsnes by a huge margin..

Målselva is an important habitat for many economically important species, like salmonids, including sea trout, Atlantic salmon, and arctic charr.
