= Bardufoss =

Town in Målselv Municipality, Norway

Bardufoss (Norwegian); Beardogorži (Northern Sami)
- Town/City
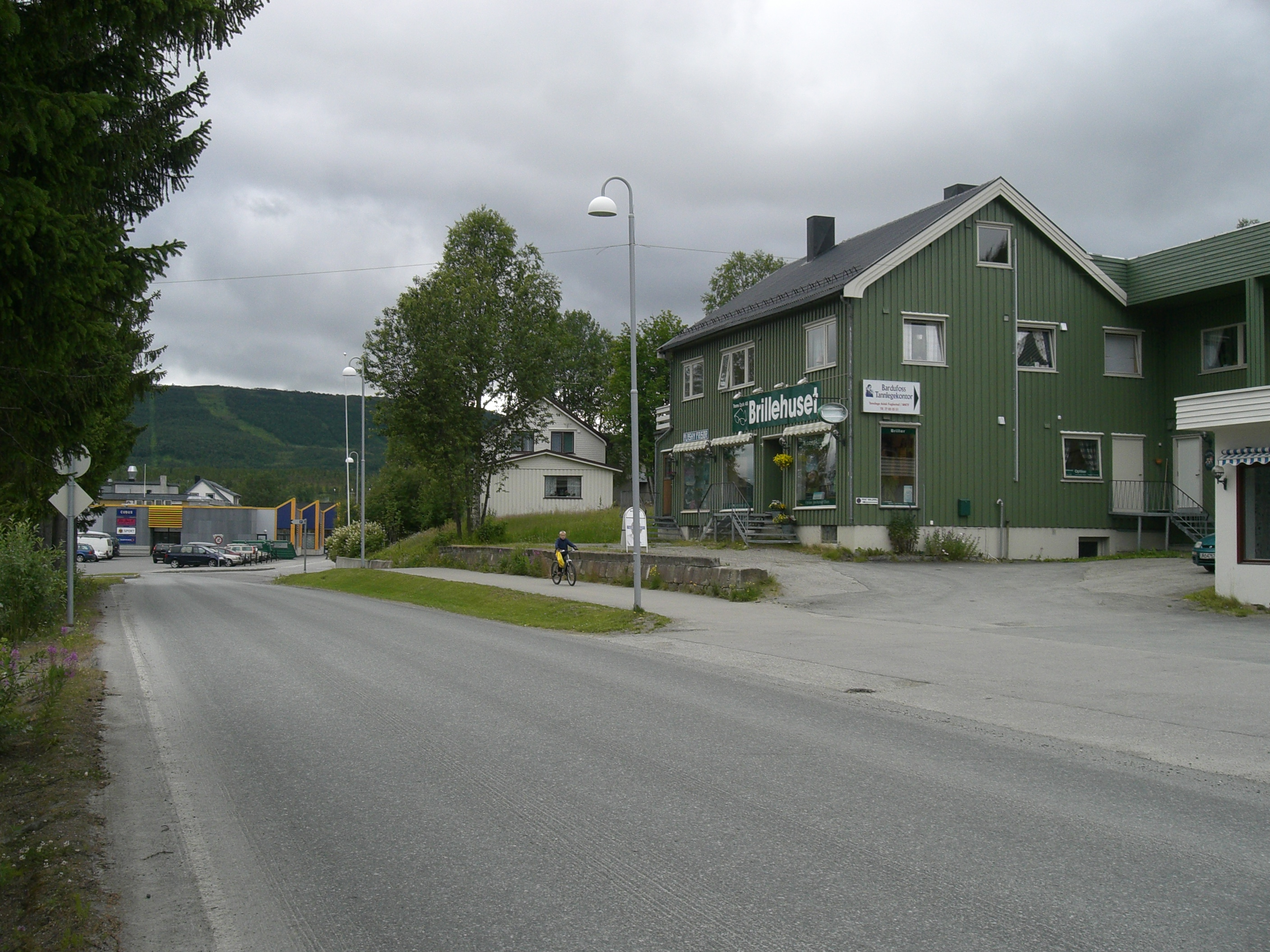
- View of the Bardufoss area
- Interactive map of: Bardufoss (Norwegian); Beardogorži (Northern Sami)
- Location within Troms Location within Norway
- Coordinates: 69.0645°N 18.5152°E
- Country: Norway
- Region: Northern Norway
- County: Troms
- District: Midt-Troms
- Municipality: Målselv Municipality
- Established as
- Town (By): 2021

Area
  - Total: 3.71 km^{2} (1.43 sq mi)
- Elevation: 68 m (223 ft)

Population (2023)
  - Total: 2,752
  - Density: 742/km^{2} (1,920/sq mi)
- Time zone: UTC+01:00 (CET)
  - Summer (DST): UTC+02:00 (CEST)
- Post Code: 9325 Bardufoss

Bardufoss (Norwegian) or Beardogorži (Northern Sami) is a town and commercial centre in Målselv Municipality in Troms county, Norway. The urban area was formally established as a town under Norwegian law in 2021 when the three villages of Andselv, Andslimoen, and Heggelia were merged together to form the new town of Bardufoss. The three neighboring villages are now considered as boroughs or neighborhoods within the larger town.

Bardufoss is located in the Målselvdalen valley near the confluence of the Barduelva and Målselva rivers. It is located about 82 kilometres (51 mi) north of the town of Narvik and about 70 kilometres (43 mi) south of the city of Tromsø. Bardufoss Airport is located here. The 3.71-square-kilometre (920-acre) town has a population (2023) of 2,752 and a population density of 742 inhabitants per square kilometre (1,920/sq mi).

== Military ==
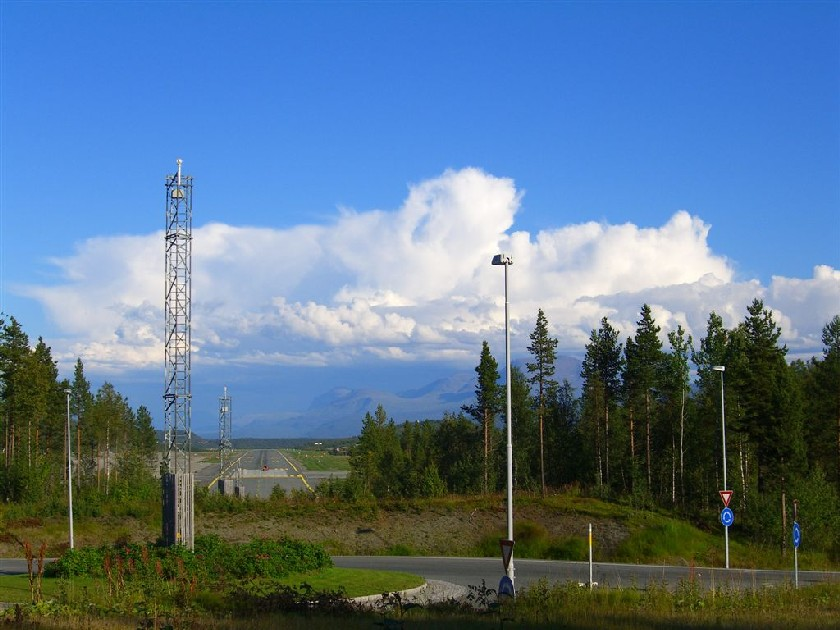
Runway at Bardufoss airport, Bardufoss.

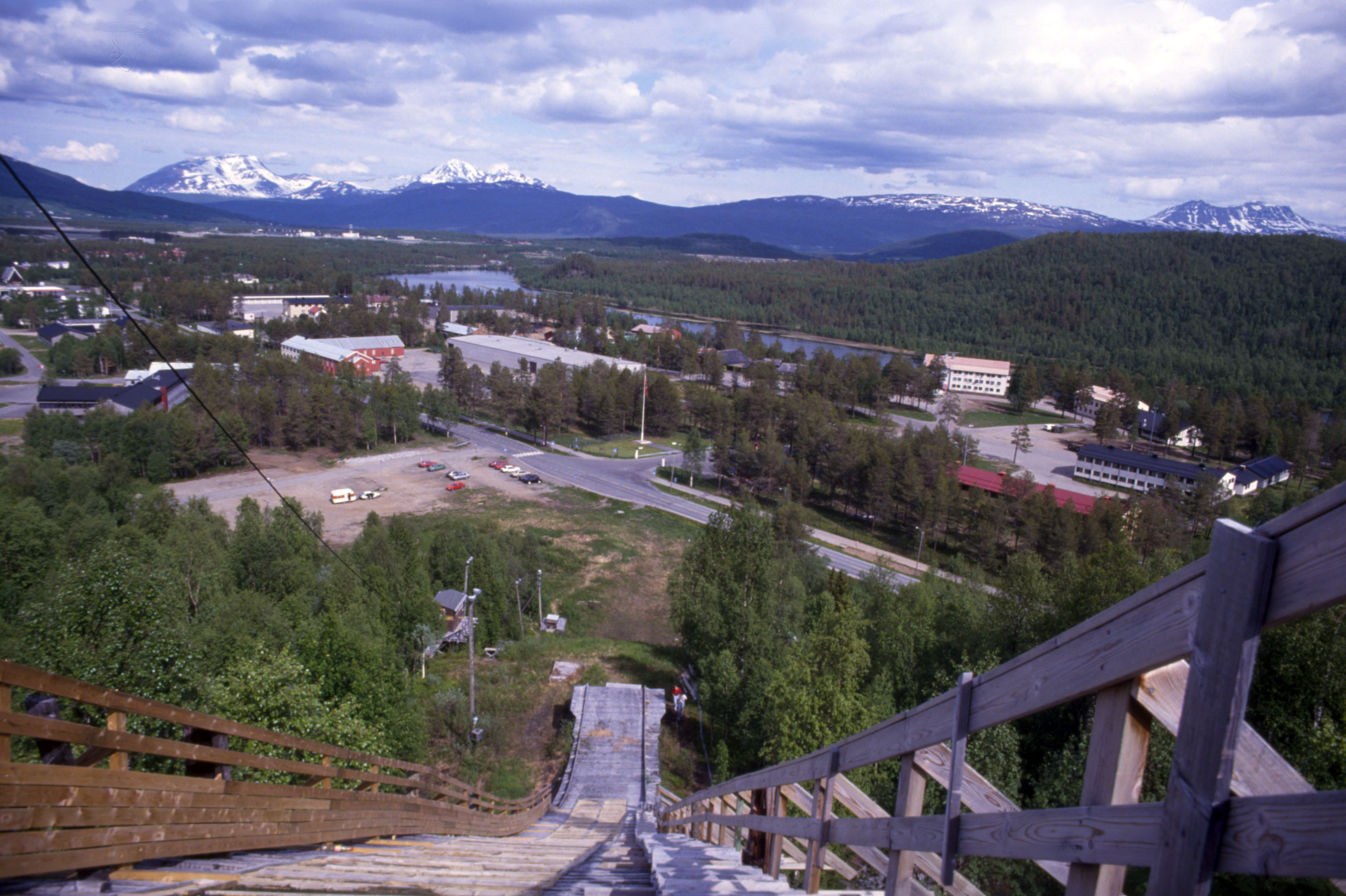
Heggelia is the southern part of Bardufoss. View from a ski jump.

Bardufoss has a civilian and military airport, Bardufoss Air Station, suitable for landing bomber aircraft, fighter jets such as F-16s, and other heavy planes. Bardufoss was also the home of the Norwegian Army's 6th division (dissolved in 2009).

There is a street in Bardufoss that is named General Fleischers Veg in honour of Carl Gustav Fleischer.

The airport was renamed Snowman International on 19 March 2011 by a Norwegian Minister after a commercial flight landed from Manchester, England, to join the celebrations.

== Nature ==
Bardufoss is covered in flora. The natural forest is mostly made up of Downy birch, Scots pine, aspen and Grey alder. However, Norway spruce has been planted in plantations since the middle part of the 20th century for economic reasons (timber). Bardufoss and its airport are used as settings in the TV drama Outlier (2020).

== Climate ==
Although not far from the coast, Bardufoss and the larger Målselvdalen valley are known for a continental climate, and hence, colder winters (but with less humidity and little wind) compared to the coastal areas. There is very reliable snow cover in winter, while summer days often are warmer than in Tromsø.

There is on average 93 days each winter with daily low −10 °C (14 °F) or colder, and 28 days with low −20 °C (−4 °F) or colder. The winter season sees on average 68 days with at least 50 centimetres (20 in) snow cover on the ground, 126 days with at least 25 centimetres (9.8 in) snow cover, and 179 days with at least 5 centimetres (2.0 in) snow cover. In the warm season there is on average 116 days per year when the daily average high reaches 10 °C (50 °F) or warmer and 22 days with daily average high above 20 °C (68 °F). Precipitation is fairly moderate, there is on average 75 days each year with at least 3 millimetres (0.12 in) precipitation and 15 days per year with at least 10 millimetres (0.39 in) precipitation. This is based on data from Met.no with 1971-2000 as base period.

Recent years have seen warming. Six of the monthly record highs are from after 2000. The November record low is from 2019.

Climate data for Bardufoss 1991-2020 (76 m, extremes 1940-2025)
Month	Jan	Feb	Mar	Apr	May	Jun	Jul	Aug	Sep	Oct	Nov	Dec	Year
Record high °C (°F)	8.9 (48.0)	9.5 (49.1)	11.9 (53.4)	17.5 (63.5)	27.7 (81.9)	31.4 (88.5)	33.5 (92.3)	32.2 (90.0)	24.8 (76.6)	20 (68)	12.6 (54.7)	10.1 (50.2)	33.5 (92.3)
Mean daily maximum °C (°F)	−4.1 (24.6)	−3.5 (25.7)	0.4 (32.7)	4.9 (40.8)	10.1 (50.2)	14.9 (58.8)	18.2 (64.8)	16.7 (62.1)	11.9 (53.4)	4.6 (40.3)	−0.5 (31.1)	−2.7 (27.1)	5.9 (42.6)
Daily mean °C (°F)	−9.7 (14.5)	−9.1 (15.6)	−5.1 (22.8)	0.6 (33.1)	6 (43)	10.7 (51.3)	13.7 (56.7)	12.3 (54.1)	7.4 (45.3)	0.8 (33.4)	−4.7 (23.5)	−7.8 (18.0)	1.3 (34.3)
Mean daily minimum °C (°F)	−13.1 (8.4)	−12.6 (9.3)	−9.3 (15.3)	−3.8 (25.2)	1.8 (35.2)	6.9 (44.4)	9.7 (49.5)	8.1 (46.6)	3.9 (39.0)	−2.2 (28.0)	−8.1 (17.4)	−11.3 (11.7)	−2.5 (27.5)
Record low °C (°F)	−36.2 (−33.2)	−34.8 (−30.6)	−31.7 (−25.1)	−25.1 (−13.2)	−11.2 (11.8)	−2 (28)	0.6 (33.1)	−4 (25)	−12.4 (9.7)	−25.5 (−13.9)	−29.8 (−21.6)	−38.1 (−36.6)	−38.1 (−36.6)
Average precipitation mm (inches)	68.9 (2.71)	58.5 (2.30)	62.4 (2.46)	34.2 (1.35)	34.4 (1.35)	45.5 (1.79)	62.7 (2.47)	64.5 (2.54)	71.4 (2.81)	72 (2.8)	56.4 (2.22)	72.5 (2.85)	703.4 (27.65)
Average precipitation days (≥ 1 mm)	12	11	11	9	9	9	11	11	13	13	11	13	133
Source: NOAA
