= Allied Forces South Norway =

Coordinates: 58°54′20″N 5°43′18″E

- Active: 1952 - 1994
- Allegiance: (NATO) North Atlantic Treaty Organization
- Part of: Allied Forces Northern Europe, Kolsås, Norway
- Location: Stavanger, Norway

Allied Forces South Norway (SONOR) was a NATO command tasked with the defense of Southern Norway. SONOR's area of responsibility included all of Norway with the adjacent sea territory excluding the three northernmost counties of Norway, which were under Allied Forces North Norway.

== History ==
Allied Forces South Norway (SONOR) and was activated in 1962 along with Allied Forces North Norway (NON) and Allied Forces Baltic Approaches. Unlike most other NATO commands SONOR was a staffed entirely by members of the Norwegian Armed Forces. Its operational headquarters was located in Stavanger and today houses NATO's Joint Warfare Centre. The commander of SONOR had three deputies: Commander Land Forces South Norway, Commander Air Forces South Norway and Commander Naval Forces South Norway. Incoming allied units would have come under the command of these three deputy commanders.

== Structure 1989 ==
In case of war SONOR had the following units at its disposal:

- Allied Forces South Norway (SONOR), commanded by a Norwegian lieutenant general:

=== Commander Naval Forces South Norway ===
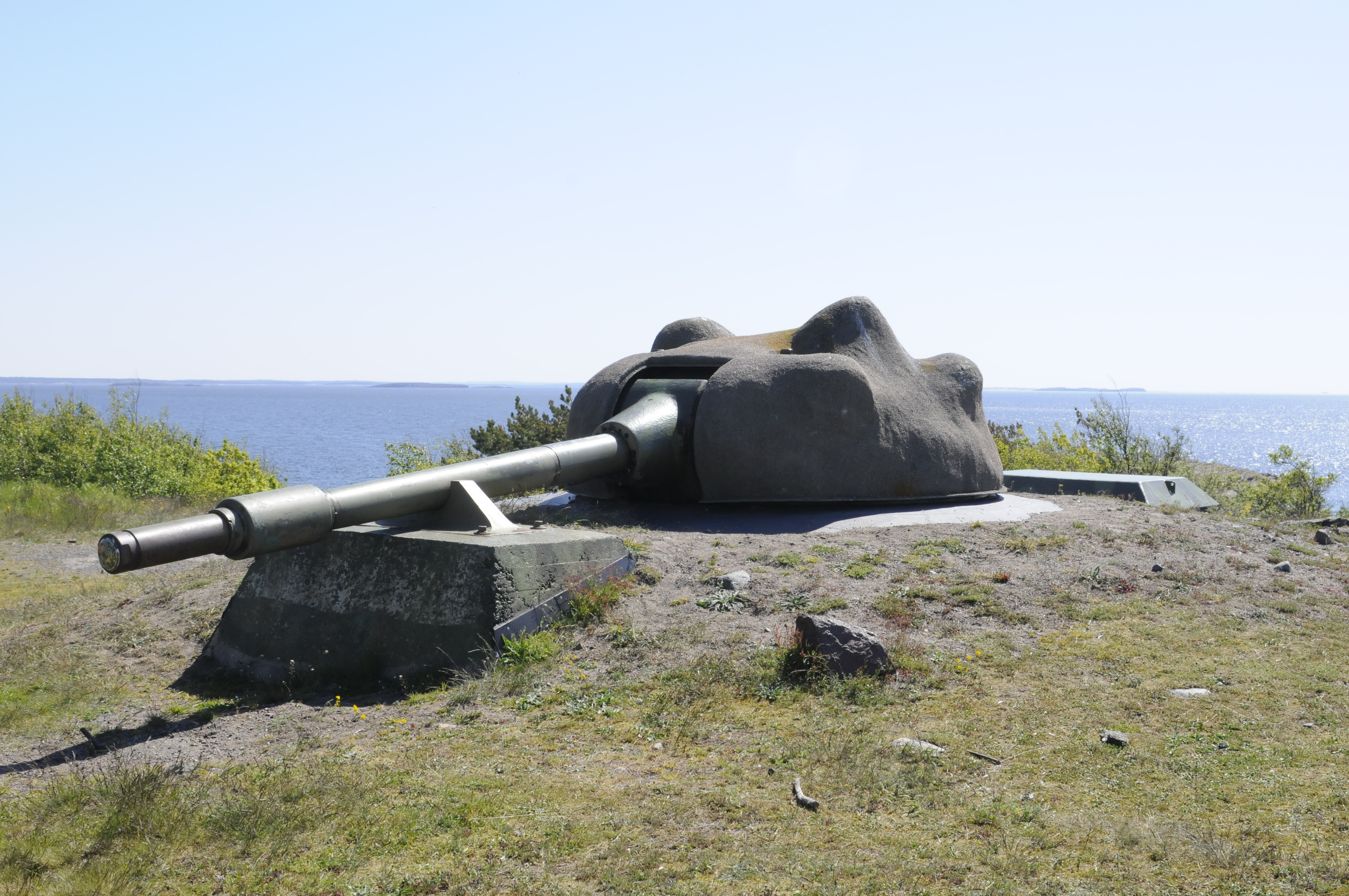
Bolærne Fortress 75mm Tornpjäs m/57 automatic gun

Naval Forces South Norway (NAVSONOR) was tasked with the defence of Southern Norway's coastal waters against Soviet naval incursions and amphibious landings. Operations to the South of Norway's coastal waters were under the command of NATO's Allied Command Channel and Allied Forces Baltic Approaches. Therefore, most major naval units of the Norwegian Navy would have come under other NATO commands, with NAVSONOR retaining control of coastal artillery units and smaller coastal defense boats. NAVSONOR also dispatched a squadron of fast attack crafts to NAVNON on a rotational basis.

- Commander Naval Forces South Norway (NAVSONOR), commanded by a Norwegian rear admiral:
  - Fredriksvern Naval Base in Larvik Municipality
  - Haakonsvern Naval Base in Bergen Municipality
  - Marvika Naval Base in Kristiansand Municipality
  - Coastal Artillery
    - Nord-Trøndelag county:
      - Ledangsholm Torpedo Battery in Statland in Namsos Municipality (on the Namsenfjorden covering the approach to Namsos)
    - Sør-Trøndelag county:
      - Agdenes Group at the mouth of the Trondheimsfjord to protect Trondheim
        - Austrått Fort in Opphaug (without functioning artillery)
        - Brettingen Fort near Fevåg in Rissa Municipality
        - Hambåra Fort near Vassbygda
        - Hysnes Fort in Hasselvika
        - Sørviknes Torpedo Battery in Hasselvika
        - Kråkvåg Fort with 3x 120mm Tornautomatpjäs m/70 automatic guns
        - Tarva Fort and Signal Station on Husøya island
        - Løkhaug Fort in Løkhaug
    - Sogn og Fjordane county:
      - Nesje Fort in Leirvik covering the entry of the Sognefjord
    - Hordaland county:
      - Fortress group to cover the Northern approach to Bergen
        - Herdla Torpedo Battery on Herdla island
        - Skjellanger Fort with 2x Tornpjäs m/57 automatic guns to defend the Hjeltefjorden
      - Fortress group to cover the Southern approach to Bergen
        - Fjell Fortress Fort in Fjell Municipality covering landing beaches near Bergen
        - Korsnes Torpedo Battery near Krokeidet
        - Neset Fort in Neset
        - Tittelsnes Fort near Valevåg
        - Visterøy Fort with 2x 75mm Tornpjäs m/57 automatic guns to defend the Korsfjorden
    - Rogaland county:
      - Fortress group defending Stavanger
        - Brimse Fort on Brimse island
        - Fjøløy Fort on Fjøløy island
        - Hundvåg Fort on Hundvåg island
        - Mastrafjorden Fort near Vikevåg
        - Neset Fort
        - Tau Fort in Tau
        - Vigdel Fort in Sola Municipality
    - Vest-Agder county:
      - Fortress group defending Kristiansand
        - Beltevika Fort on Flekkerøy island
        - Krossodden on Flekkerøy island
        - Møvik Fort in Møvik
        - Odderøya Fort on Odderøya island
        - Randøya Fort on East Randøya island
    - Vestfold county:
      - Fortress Group Larvik
        - Folehavna Fort in Vesterøyveien
        - Malmøya Fort on Malmøya island
        - Oddane Fort in Nevlunghavn
        - Tangen Fort near Langesund (in Telemark county)
      - Fortress group on the Western side of the Oslofjord
        - Bolærne Fort near Tønsberg with 3x 75mm Tornpjäs m/57 automatic guns covering the entry to the Oslofjord
        - Torås Fort in Tjøme
        - Svelvik Fort in Hurum Municipality blocking the Svelvikstrømmen Sound (in Buskerud county)
    - Østfold county:
      - Fortress group on the Eastern side of the Oslofjord
        - Kjøkøy Fort in Kråkerøy
        - Rauøy Fort on Rauer island with 3x 75mm Tornpjäs m/57 automatic guns
        - Torgauten Fort to the Southwest of Fredrikstad
        - Mørvika Fort near the border with Sweden
        - Oscarsborg Fortress with an underground torpedo battery (in Akershus county)

==== Royal Norwegian Navy Fleet ====
In 1989 the Royal Norwegian Navy had the following ship and submarines in service. While these units were all based in Southern Norway, in wartime the submarines and frigates might have been dispatched to the various NATO commands defending the North Sea and the Baltic Approaches, while some of the patrol boats would have been sent to reinforce NAVNON in Northern Norway.

- Royal Norwegian Navy
  - Oslo class frigates: HNoMS Oslo (F300), HNoMS Bergen (F301), HNoMS Trondheim (F302), HNoMS Stavanger (F303), HNoMS Narvik (F304)
  - Sleipner class corvettes: HNoMS Sleipner (F310), HNoMS Æger (F311)
  - Snøgg class patrol boats: HNoMS Snøgg (P980), HNoMS Rapp (P981), HNoMS Snar (P982), HNoMS Rask (P983), HNoMS Kvikk (P984), HNoMS Kjapp (P985)
  - Storm class patrol boats: HNoMS Storm (P960), HNoMS Blink (P961), HNoMS Glimt (P962), HNoMS Skjold (P963), HNoMS Trygg (P964), HNoMS Kjekk (P965), HNoMS Djerv (P966), HNoMS Skudd (P967), HNoMS Arg (P968), HNoMS Steil (P969), HNoMS Brann (P970), HNoMS Tross (P971), HNoMS Hvass (P972), HNoMS Traust (P973), HNoMS Brott (P974), HNoMS Odd (P975), HNoMS Pil (P976), HNoMS Brask (P977), HNoMS Rokk (P978), HNoMS Gnist (P979)
  - Hauk class patrol boats: HNoMS Hauk (P986), HNoMS Ørn (P987), HNoMS Terne (P988), HNoMS Tjeld (P989), HNoMS Skarv (P990), HNoMS Teist (P991), HNoMS Jo (P992), HNoMS Lom (P993), HNoMS Stegg (P994), HNoMS Falk (P995), HNoMS Ravn (P996), HNoMS Gribb (P997), HNoMS Geir (P998), HNoMS Erle (P999)
  - Mine Control Vessels: HNoMS Borgen (N51)
  - Vidar class minelayers: HNoMS Vidar (N52), HNoMS Vale (N53)
  - Sauda class minesweepers: HNoMS Tana (M313), HNoMS Alta (M314), HNoMS Tista (M331), HNoMS Kvina (M332), HNoMS Utla (M334)
  - Kvalsund class amphibious landing ships: HNoMS Kvalsund (L4500), HNoMS Raftsund (L4501)
  - Reinøysund class amphibious landing ships: HNoMS Reinøysund (L4502), HNoMS Sørøysund (L4503), HNoMS Maursund (L4504), HNoMS Rotsund (L4505), HNoMS Borgsund (L4506)
  - Support Ship: HNoMS Horten (A530)
  - ELINT Ship: FS Marjata 2
  - Training vessels: HNoMS Christian Radich, HNoMS Sørlandet, HNoMS Vigra (P359), HNoMS Hessa (P358)

All submarines of the navy were under command of the 1st Submarine Flotilla and homeported in Haakonsvern. In 1989 the navy began to replace some of its Kobben class submarines with the more modern Ula class. The Kobben staying in service were extensively modernized.

- 1st Submarine Flotilla, based in Haakonsvern
  - Kobben class submarines: HNoMS Utsira (S301), HNoMS Utstein (S302), HNoMS Sklinna (S305), HNoMS Skolpen (S306) (transferred to Naval Reserve in 1989), HNoMS Stord (S308) (Naval Reserve since 1987), HNoMS Svenner (S309), HNoMS Kaura (S315), HNoMS Kinn (S316), HNoMS Kya (S317) (transferred to Denmark on 7 September 1989), HNoMS Kobben (S318), HNoMS Kunna (S319)
  - Ula class submarines: HNoMS Ula (S300) and 5x more under construction

In times of war the Royal Norwegian Navy would have been reinforced by the Sea Home Guard, which manned older vessels taken out of service by the navy:

- Tjeld class torpedo boats: HNoMS Sel (P343), HNoMS Hval (P348), HNoMS Laks (P349), HNoMS Knurr (P357), HNoMS Skrei (P380), HNoMS Hai (P381), HNoMS Lyr (P387), HNoMS Delfin (P388)
- Sauda class minesweepers: HNoMS Sira (M312), HNoMS Vosso (M316), HNoMS Glomma (M317)

Additionally the Royal Norwegian Navy would have been reinforced in wartime with three offshore patrol vessels of the Coast Guard:

- Nordkapp class offshore patrol vessel: KV Nordkapp (W320), KV Senja (W321), KV Andenes (W322)

=== Commander Air Forces South Norway ===
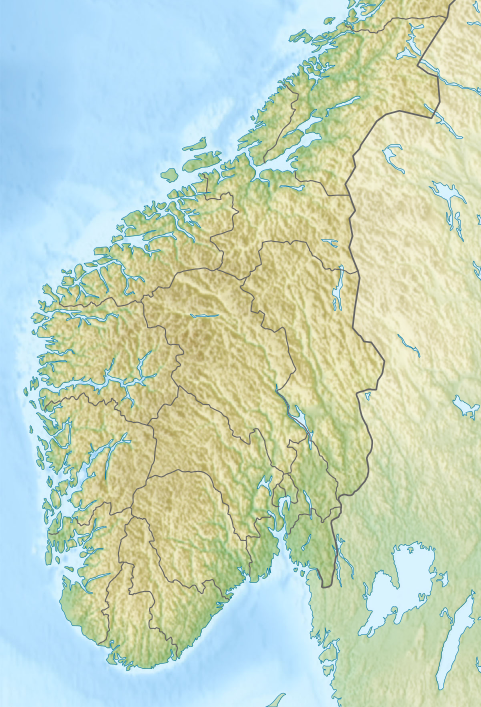
Norwegian Air Force bases in Southern Norway

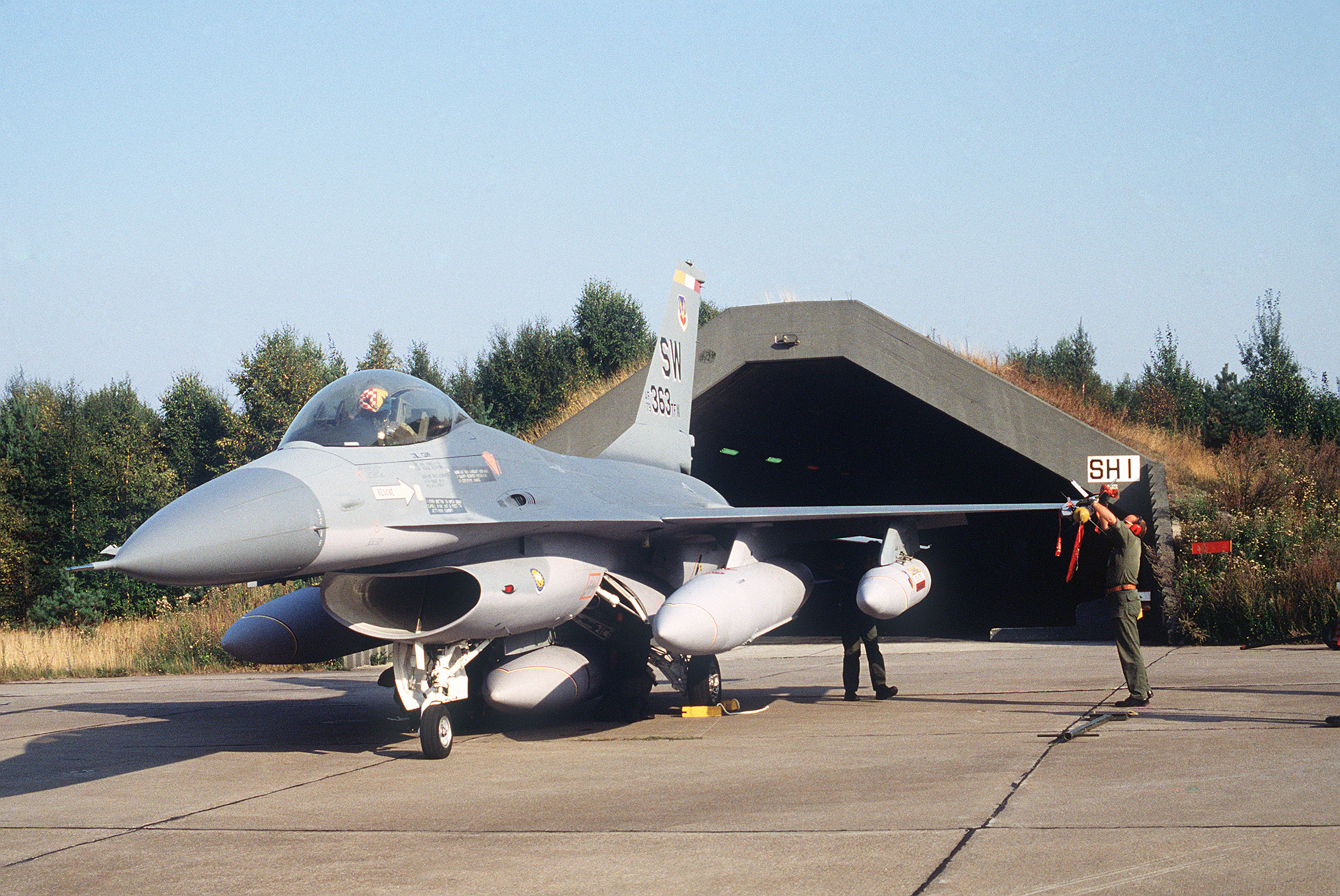
A US Air Force F-16 Fighting Falcon from the 363rd Tactical Fighter Wing at Rygge Air Station during Exercise Coronet Gauntlet '83.

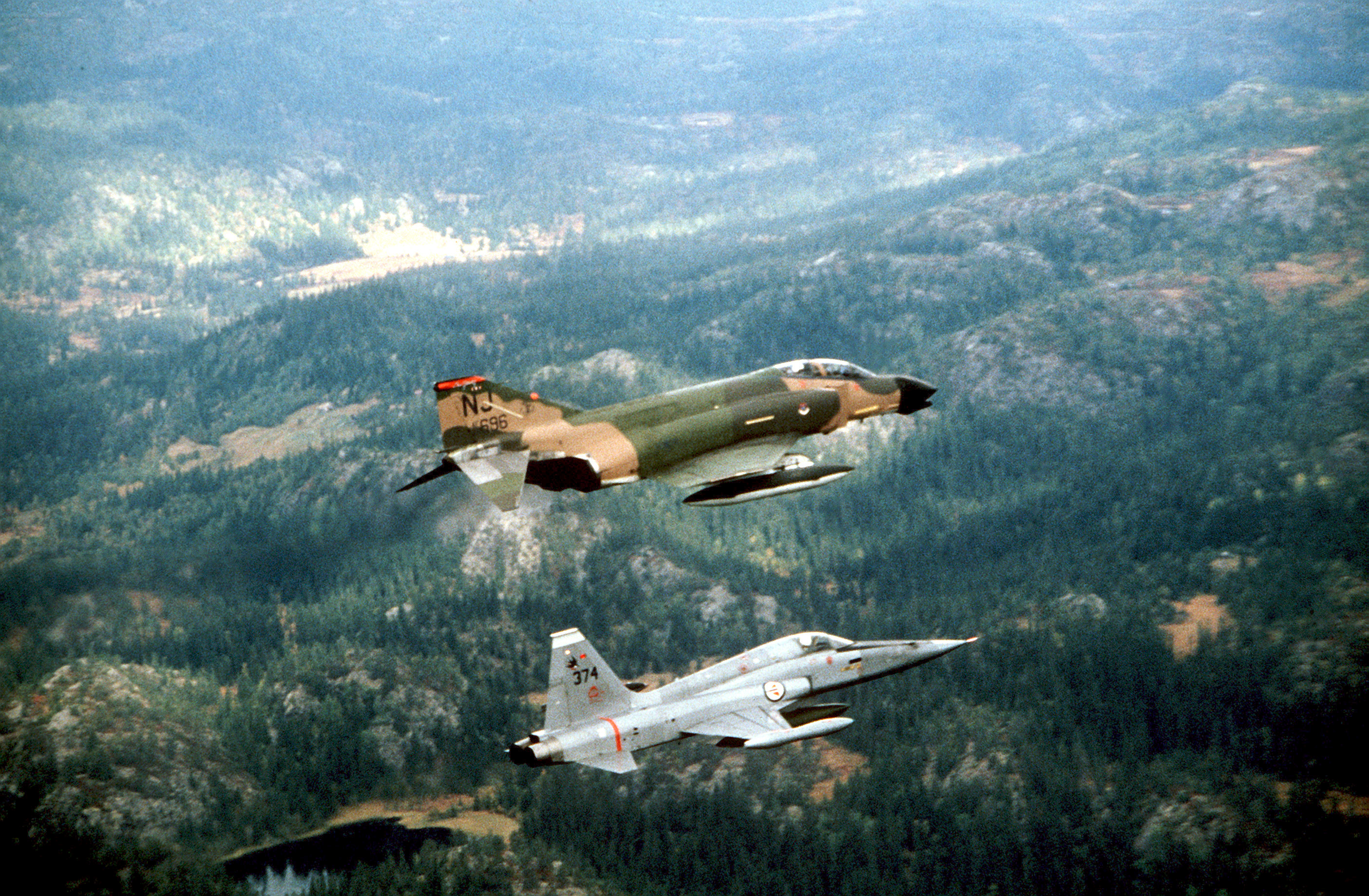
A Norwegian NF-5A and a US Air Force F-4D Phantom II of the New Jersey Air National Guard over Southern Norway during exercise Coronet Rawhide '82.

- Commander Air Forces South Norway (AIRSONOR), commanded by a Norwegian major general:
  - Control and Reporting Centre Mågerø managed by the 130th Air Wing
  - Rygge Air Station
    - 137th Air Wing
      - 332nd Fighter/Bomber Squadron with 18x F-16A/B
      - 336th Fighter/Bomber Squadron with 18x NF-5A
      - 720th Helicopter Squadron with 12x UH-1B
      - Search and Rescue Detachment from the 330th Helicopter Squadron with 2x Sea King Mk43
  - Ørland Air Station
    - 138th Air Wing
      - 338th Fighter/Bomber Squadron with 18x F-16A
      - 330th Helicopter Squadron with 2x Sea King Mk43, detachments at Rygge, Sola, Bodø and Banak
      - Norwegian Adapted Hawk Air-defense Battery with 3x Hawk launchers and 3x 40 mm L/70 radar-guided anti-aircraft guns
  - Gardermoen Air Station
    - 135th Air Wing
      - 335th Transport Squadron, with 6x C-130H and 3x Falcon 20ECM electronic countermeasures aircraft
  - Sola Air Station
    - Search and Rescue Detachment from the 330th Helicopter Squadron with 2x Sea King Mk43
  - Værnes Air Station
    - Flight School with 16x MFI-17 Supporter
    - Norwegian Adapted Hawk Air-defense Battery with 3x Hawk launchers and 3x 40mm L/70 radar-guided anti-aircraft guns
  - Kjeller Air Station, main maintenance facility of the Royal Norwegian Air Force
  - Flesland Air Station, a US Air Force forward operating base without assigned squadrons in peacetime
  - 4x MIM-14 Nike Hercules batteries at Rygge Air Station, Gardermoen Air Station and in Hamnås and Oslo with 32x launchers each to defend Oslo

=== Commander Land Forces South Norway ===
- Commander Land Forces South Norway (LANDSONOR), commanded by a Norwegian major general:
  - Distriktskommando Trøndelag in Trondheim covering Central Norway
    - Brigade 12 (Norwegian Home Guard District 12 mobilization unit) in Trondheim
      - 1st Armored Battalion with 26 Leopard 1 tanks, 29x NM135 infantry fighting vehicles
      - 2nd Infantry Battalion with Bandvagn 206, 4x NM142 ATGM carriers and 4x M106 mortar carriers
      - 3rd Infantry Battalion with Bandvagn 206, 4x NM142 ATGM carriers and 4x M106 mortar carriers
      - 4th Infantry Battalion with Bandvagn 206, 4x NM142 ATGM carriers and 4x M106 mortar carriers
      - Field Artillery Battalion with 18x M109G 155 mm self-propelled howitzers
      - Reconnaissance Squadron with 3x NM135 infantry fighting vehicles
      - Anti-tank Missile Company with 4x NM142 ATGM carriers and 4x NM116 light tanks
      - Anti-Aircraft Battery with 6x NM195 anti-air missile vehicles and 6x 40 mm L/60 anti-aircraft guns
      - Engineer Company
      - Artillery Observation Platoon in Setermoen with 2x Cessna O-1A planes
    - Brigade 13 (Norwegian Home Guard District 13 mobilization unit) in Steinkjer
      - 1st Infantry Battalion with 4x TOW ATGM missile launchers and 4x M30 107 mm mortars
      - 2nd Infantry Battalion with 4x TOW ATGM missile launchers and 4x M30 107mm mortars
      - 3rd Infantry Battalion with 4x TOW ATGM missile launchers and 4x M30 107mm mortars
      - Field Artillery Battalion with 24x M114 155 mm towed howitzers
      - Reconnaissance Squadron with 3x NM135 infantry fighting vehicles
      - Anti-tank Missile Company with 4x NM142 ATGM carriers and 4x NM116 light tanks
      - Anti-Aircraft Battery with 6x RBS 70 man-portable air-defense systems and 6x 40 mm L/60 anti-aircraft guns
      - Engineer Company
      - Artillery Observation Platoon in Setermoen with 2x Cessna O-1A planes
    - Norwegian Home Guard District 11 Møre og Romsdal - Molde and Setnesmoen (Home Guard militia in Møre og Romsdal)
      - Infantry Battalion with 4x TOW ATGM missile launchers and 4x M30 107mm mortars
      - Artillery Battery with 8x M101 105 mm towed howitzers
    - Norwegian Home Guard District 12 Sør-Trøndelag - Trondheim (Home Guard militia in Sør-Trøndelag)
    - Norwegian Home Guard District 13 Nord-Trøndelag - Steinkjer (Home Guard militia in Nord-Trøndelag)
  - Distriktskommando Sør- og Vestlandet in Bergen covering Southern Norway and Western Norway
    - Brigade 7 (Norwegian Home Guard District 7 mobilization unit) in Kristiansand
      - 1st Infantry Battalion with 4x TOW ATGM missile launchers and 4x M30 107mm mortars
      - 2nd Infantry Battalion with 4x TOW ATGM missile launchers and 4x M30 107mm mortars
      - 3rd Infantry Battalion with 4x TOW ATGM missile launchers and 4x M30 107mm mortars
      - Field Artillery Battalion with 24x M101 105mm towed howitzers
      - Reconnaissance Squadron with 3x NM135 infantry fighting vehicles
      - Anti-tank Missile Company with 4x NM142 ATGM carriers and 4x NM116 light tanks
      - Anti-Aircraft Battery with 6x RBS 70 man-portable air-defense systems and 6x 40 mm L/60 anti-aircraft guns
      - Engineer Company
      - Artillery Observation Platoon in Setermoen with 2x Cessna O-1A planes
    - Brigade 8 (Norwegian Home Guard District 8 mobilization unit) in Stavanger
      - 1st Infantry Battalion with 4x TOW ATGM missile launchers and 4x M30 107mm mortars
      - 2nd Infantry Battalion with 4x TOW ATGM missile launchers and 4x M30 107mm mortars
      - 3rd Infantry Battalion with 4x TOW ATGM missile launchers and 4x M30 107mm mortars
      - Field Artillery Battalion with 24x M101 105mm towed howitzers
      - Reconnaissance Squadron with 3x NM135 infantry fighting vehicles
      - Anti-tank Missile Company with 4x NM142 ATGM carriers and 4x NM116 light tanks
      - Anti-Aircraft Battery with 6x RBS 70 man-portable air-defense systems and 6x 40 mm L/60 anti-aircraft guns
      - Engineer Company
    - Brigade Vestlandet (Norwegian Home Guard District 9 and 10 mobilization unit) in Bergen
      - 1st Infantry Battalion with 4x TOW ATGM missile launchers and 4x M30 107mm mortars
      - 2nd Infantry Battalion with 4x TOW ATGM missile launchers and 4x M30 107mm mortars
      - 3rd Infantry Battalion with 4x TOW ATGM missile launchers and 4x M30 107mm mortars
      - Field Artillery Battalion with 24x M101 105mm towed howitzers
      - Reconnaissance Squadron with 3x NM135 infantry fighting vehicles
      - Anti-tank Missile Company with 4x NM142 ATGM carriers and 4x NM116 light tanks
      - Anti-Aircraft Battery with 6x RBS 70 man-portable air-defense systems and 6x 40 mm L/60 anti-aircraft guns
      - Engineer Company
    - Norwegian Home Guard District 7 Agder – Kristiansand (Home Guard militia in Agder)
    - Norwegian Home Guard District 8 Rogaland – Vatneleiren (Home Guard militia in Rogaland)
      - Tank Company with 17x M48A5 tanks
    - Norwegian Home Guard District 9 Bergenhus in Ulven (Home Guard militia in Hordaland)
    - Norwegian Home Guard District 10 Sogn og Fjordane in Eid Municipality (Sogn og Fjordane) (Home Guard militia in Sogn og Fjordane)
  - Distriktskommando Østlandet in Oslo covering Eastern Norway
    - Brigade 1 (Norwegian Home Guard District 1 mobilization unit) in Fredrikstad
      - 1st Infantry Battalion with 4x TOW ATGM missile launchers and 4x M30 107mm mortars
      - 2nd Infantry Battalion with 4x TOW ATGM missile launchers and 4x M30 107mm mortars
      - 3rd Infantry Battalion with 4x TOW ATGM missile launchers and 4x M30 107mm mortars
      - Field Artillery Battalion with 24x M101 105mm towed howitzers
      - Reconnaissance Squadron with 3x NM135 infantry fighting vehicles
      - Anti-tank Missile Company with 4x NM142 ATGM carriers and 4x NM116 light tanks
      - Anti-Aircraft Battery with 6x RBS 70 man-portable air-defense systems and 6x 40 mm L/60 anti-aircraft guns
      - Engineer Company
    - Brigade 3 (Norwegian Home Guard District 3 mobilization unit) in Heistadmoen
      - 1st Infantry Battalion with 4x TOW ATGM missile launchers and 4x M30 107mm mortars
      - 2nd Infantry Battalion with 4x TOW ATGM missile launchers and 4x M30 107mm mortars
      - 3rd Infantry Battalion with 4x TOW ATGM missile launchers and 4x M30 107mm mortars
      - Field Artillery Battalion with 24x M101 105mm towed howitzers
      - Reconnaissance Squadron with 3x NM135 infantry fighting vehicles
      - Anti-tank Missile Company with 4x NM142 ATGM carriers and 4x NM116 light tanks
      - Anti-Aircraft Battery with 6x RBS 70 man-portable air-defense systems and 6x 40 mm L/60 anti-aircraft guns
      - Engineer Company
    - Brigade Sør-Norge (Norwegian Home Guard District 2 and 4 mobilization unit) in Onsrud
      - 1st Armored Battalion with 38 M48A5 tanks, 29x NM135 infantry fighting vehicles
      - 2nd Infantry Battalion with Bandvagn 206, 4x NM142 ATGM carriers and 4x M106 mortar carriers
      - 3rd Infantry Battalion with Bandvagn 206, 4x NM142 ATGM carriers and 4x M106 mortar carriers
      - 4th Infantry Battalion with Bandvagn 206, 4x NM142 ATGM carriers and 4x M106 mortar carriers
      - Field Artillery Battalion with 18x M109G 155 mm self-propelled howitzers
      - Reconnaissance Squadron with 3x NM135 infantry fighting vehicles
      - Anti-tank Missile Company with 4x NM142 ATGM carriers and 4x NM116 light tanks
      - Anti-Aircraft Battery with 6x NM195 anti-air missile vehicles and 6x 40 mm L/60 anti-aircraft guns
      - Engineer Company
      - Artillery Observation Platoon in Setermoen with 2x Cessna O-1A planes
    - Norwegian Home Guard District 1 Østfold – Ravneberget (Home Guard militia in Østfold)
      - Artillery Battalion with 24x M101 105mm towed howitzers
    - Norwegian Home Guard District 2 Stor-Oslo – Oslo (Home Guard militia in Greater Oslo Region including Akershus)
      - Hans Majestet Kongens Garde Battalion
      - Infantry Battalion with 4x TOW ATGM missile launchers and 4x M30 107mm mortars
      - Infantry Battalion with 4x TOW ATGM missile launchers and 4x M30 107mm mortars
      - Infantry Battalion with 4x TOW ATGM missile launchers and 4x M30 107mm mortars
      - Infantry Battalion with 4x TOW ATGM missile launchers and 4x M30 107mm mortars
      - Infantry Battalion with 4x TOW ATGM missile launchers and 4x M30 107mm mortars
      - Infantry Battalion with 4x TOW ATGM missile launchers and 4x M30 107mm mortars
      - Infantry Battalion with 4x TOW ATGM missile launchers and 4x M30 107mm mortars
      - Infantry Battalion with 4x TOW ATGM missile launchers and 4x M30 107mm mortars
      - Infantry Battalion with 4x TOW ATGM missile launchers and 4x M30 107mm mortars
      - Artillery Battalion with 24x M101 105mm towed howitzers
      - Artillery Battalion with 24x M101 105mm towed howitzers
      - Tank Company with 13x Leopard 1 tanks
    - Norwegian Home Guard District 3 Telemark og Buskerud – Heistadmoen (Home Guard militia in Telemark and Buskerud)
      - Infantry Battalion with 4x TOW ATGM missile launchers and 4x M30 107mm mortars
      - Infantry Battalion with 4x TOW ATGM missile launchers and 4x M30 107mm mortars
      - Artillery Battalion with 24x M101 105mm towed howitzers
    - Norwegian Home Guard District 4 Hedmark – Kongsvinger (Home Guard militia in Hedmark)
    - Norwegian Home Guard District 5 Opplandske – Terningmoen (Home Guard militia in Oppland), would raise Brigade 5 for Allied Forces North Norway
    - Norwegian Home Guard District 6 Hønefoss – Hønefoss (Home Guard militia in Greater Oslo Region), would raise Brigade 6 for Allied Forces North Norway
      - Infantry Battalion with 4x TOW ATGM missile launchers and 4x M30 107mm mortars
      - Infantry Battalion with 4x TOW ATGM missile launchers and 4x M30 107mm mortars

=== US Forces in Southern Norway ===
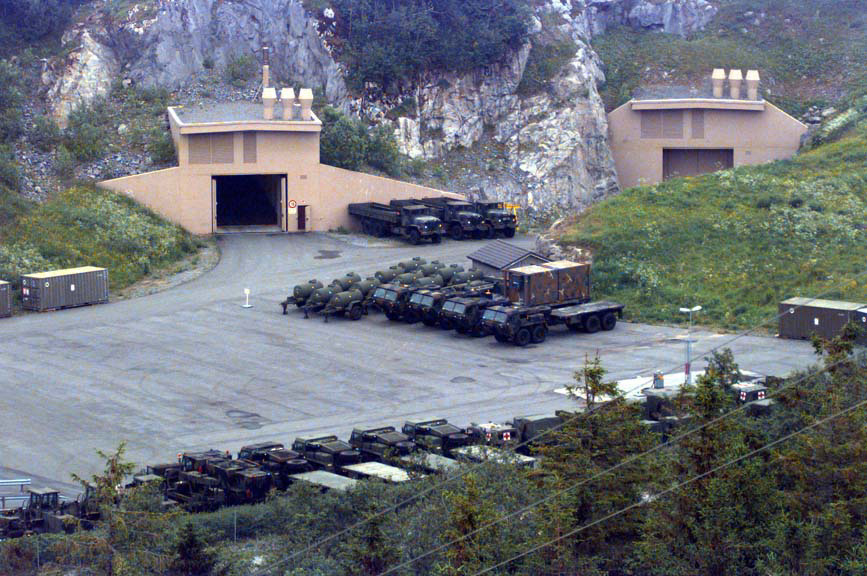
US Marine Corps Norway Air-Landed Marine Expeditionary Brigade (NALMEB) Prepositioning Program material at the Bjugn Cave Facility

In 1981 the governments of Norway and the United States signed a Memorandum of Understanding that in case of war the U.S. Marine Corps' 4th Marine Expeditionary Brigade would be deployed to Norway as the Norway Air-Landed Marine Expeditionary Brigade (NALMEB). To facilitate a rapid deployment of the brigade and its associated air and logistical units via strategic airlift the two nations agreed to preposition equipment and materiel for 15,000 troops, and war stocks for 30 days in Norway. Because of the harsh Norwegian climate it was decided that unlike the REFORGER depots in Germany, the depots in Norway would be underground facilities. Thus between 1985 and 1989 American and Norwegian engineers drilled nearly 63,000 square meters of underground storage tunnels into the mountains around Trondheim. After the sites had been filled with materiel and equipment, Norwegian troops were tasked with its maintenance, with two exceptions: the two stored fleet hospitals were maintained by two small US Navy detachments.

By 1990 the eight artificial caves were filled with all the equipment and the Norway Air-Landed Marine Expeditionary Brigade could have been deployed to Norway within 48h.

The eight underground depots were:

- Ørland Air Station, fighter wing reception site and depot
- Værnes Air Station, rotary wing reception site and depot
- Bjugn Cave Site, in Bjugn Municipality, ground equipment and supply depot
- Frigård Cave Site, in Holtålen Municipality, ground equipment and supply depot
- Tromsdal Cave Site, in Verdal Municipality, ground equipment and supply depot
- Hammerkammen Cave Site, in Stjørdal Municipality ground ammunition depot
- Hammernesodden Cave Site, in Namdalseid Municipality ground ammunition depot
- Kalvåa Cave Site, in Bjugn air/ground ammunition depot

Additionally the U.S. military maintained a small number of units in Southern Norway in peacetime:

- United States European Command
  - United States Navy
    - Fleet Hospital Support Facility 15, in Bjugn Municipality to maintain the stored Fleet Hospital Fifteen
