= Snøgg =

Snøgg may refer to

- SK Snøgg, a sports club from Notodden, Norway
- Snøgg class missile torpedo boat
  - HNoMS Snøgg
