= HNoMS Rapp =

Two Royal Norwegian Navy ships and a class of patrol boats have been named Rapp or Rap, meaning quick.

- HNoMS Rap (1873) — is named Rapp, but with old spelling. This is the world's first torpedo boat.
- HNoMS Rapp (P981) - a Snøgg-class missile torpedo boat
- The Rapp-class torpedo boats.
  - HNoMS Rapp (P351) — The lead ship of the Rapp class.
