= A530 =

A530 may refer to:

- A530 road (Great Britain)
- Canon A530, a camera
- HNoMS Horten (A530), a ship
- HNoMS Maud, a ship
