= Rapp-class patrol boat =

Class overview
- Operators: Royal Norwegian Navy
- Built: 1951–1956
- In commission: 1952–1970
- Completed: 6

General characteristics
- Type: Motor Torpedo Boat
- Displacement: 72 long tons (73 t) standard
- Length: 27 m (87 ft)
- Beam: 7.0 m (23 ft)
- Draught: 1.5 m (5 ft)
- Propulsion: 4 × Packard petrol engines, 2 shafts, 4,800 hp (3,579 kW)
- Speed: 42 kn (48 mph; 78 km/h) trials, 32 kn (37 mph; 59 km/h) sea speed
- Complement: 18
- Armament: 1 × Bofors 40 mm gun; 1 × 20 mm gun; 4 × 21 in (533 mm) torpedo tubes

The Rapp-class torpedo boats were a class of six torpedo boats built in Norway for the Royal Norwegian Navy from 1952 to 1956. They were the first Norwegian-built torpedo boats after World War II, and were designed in light of experience from operations in this war. The boats were slightly larger than the Elco class.

All six boats were built by Westermoen Båtbyggeri og Mek Verksted, Mandal, with the first, Rapp launched on 7 May 1952 and completed on 18 November 1952. The five remaining boats were completed between 1953 and 1956. All six boats were stricken in 1970.

The class was designed, constructed and scale tested by Harald Henriksen in 1946. The same design was used for 16 patrol boats delivered to the Swedish navy. Henriksen later designed the Storm class, the Snøgg class and the Hauk class.

== Boats in class ==
- Rapp P 351
- Rask P 352
- Kvikk P 353
- Kjapp P 354
- Snar P 355
- Snögg P 356
