= Mågerø (royal residence) =

Coordinates: 59°08′49″N 10°26′36″E

General information
- Location: Mågerø; Færder Municipality, Norway
- Opened: 1993
- Owner: Norwegian royal family

Design and construction
- Architect: Lund Hagem Arkitekter

Mågerø is the private holiday home and summer retreat of the Norwegian royal family. The compound is located on the small Mågerø peninsula on the island of Tjøme, which is also the retreats namesake.

== History ==
The royal family had owned several holiday retreats prior to the construction of Mågerø. This included the villa Bloksberg at Hankø, originally purchased and owned by King Olav, and the estate Berget, which was owned by Queen Sonja's family. The royal family was, however, bothered by the lack of privacy at the former retreats, and therefore wanted a proper, shelter holiday home to be constructed when King Harald and Queen Sonja ascended the throne in 1991. The complex was designed by Lund Hagem Arkitekter, and built between 1991 and 1993.

For security reasons, the retreat is located at the military area Control and Reporting Centre, which is controlled by the Norwegian Air Force.
