= HNoMS Snar =

Two Royal Norwegian Navy patrol boats have been named Snar (lit. 'quick'):

- HNoMS Snar (1887), a 2.-class torpedo boat launched in 1887
- HNoMS Snar (P982), a Snøgg-class patrol boat
