= Lyran illuminating mortar =

Weapon that fires flares

The Lyran illuminating mortar is a 71mm mortar designed by Bofors Weapon Systems primarily for armoured vehicles to fire flares to illuminate battlefields and targets. It can also be used as an infantry weapon and in marine applications.

== Background ==
In October 1964 the Swedish Arms manufacturer Bofors AB (now part of BAE Systems) filed an application with the United States Patent Office for a modular lightweight mortar whereby the major components were interchangeable between man-portable use and for attachment to armoured fighting vehicles (AFVs). In April 1966 Bofors filed a further patent application for a lightweight illumination mortar shell.

While the concept of providing battlefield illumination using flares fired from mortars was not new, Bofors' designs for a lightweight modular system - especially one that was limited to only fire illumination rounds - was, and led to the production of the Lyran 71mm Illuminating Mortar. The system was subsequently installed on a wide range of AFVs operated by NATO and other European armies.

== Design ==
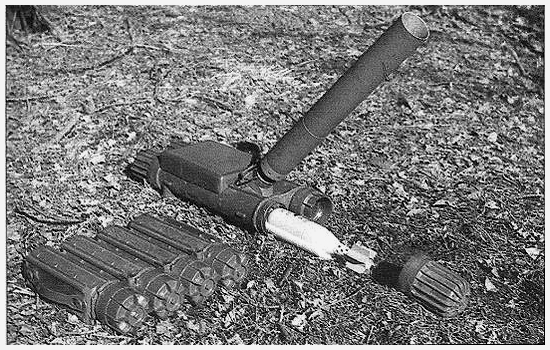
Infantry version of Lyran illuminating mortar with launcher, baseplate and ammunition

Lyran makes extensive use of plastic-based materials and the system shares a number of common components between the standard infantry/man-portable version and the vehicle-mounted version.

The system is designed so that the ammunition cases can act as the mortar base plate. The mortar flare shells are in individual plastic containers which can be connected together with the upper container in a pack having a carrying handle. The mortar flare shell comprises a front body section, rear body section and a tail unit. The front body section contains the fuse, delayed pyrotechnical charge, separating charge and the flare charge. The flare charge is ignited by the separating charge that is initiated by a primer pellet. The rear body section contains a parachute which is attached to the flare charge and a propellant charge.

The vehicle-mounted version consists of the launcher which are normally mounted in pairs on the rear of the vehicle or its turret. There is a control unit with firing buttons for two launchers and a connection cable which is attached to the vehicle's electrical bus. Required power supply is 24V DC. Launchers can be detached from vehicles and fitted to a baseplate and be used as an infantry weapon.

The system has been designed to operate within the temperature variations from an extreme Arctic winter (-40 °C) to a hot European summer and above (+60 °C).

== Operation ==
For the vehicle-mounted version, firing is initiated via the control unit which is located in the crew compartment of the vehicle.

In addition to the safe position on the fuse, each mortar flare has settings for 400, 800 and 1,300 metres range with the launcher set at an elevation of 45°. The elevation of the launcher can be varied in increments of 5°. A longer barrel is available for the launcher which increases firing distances to 450, 950 and 1,600 m respectively.

Luminous spirit levels are mounted on the launcher to assist setting the elevation at night.

== Users ==
=== Operators ===
The Lyran system is or has been in service with the armies of:

- Belgium
- Denmark
- Estonia
- Finland
- Norway
- Sweden
- Switzerland

=== Vehicles ===
The Lyran system is limited in its current applications, primarily fitted to the CV90 series of combat vehicles. However, this vehicle is in service in significant numbers with the Danish, Estonian, Finnish, Netherlands, Norwegian and Swedish armies, and is also being consider by other European armies. The system was fitted to the AIFV as used the Belgian army. This vehicle was also used by the Netherlands (where it was known as the YPR-765) and small numbers may have been fitted with the Lyran; however this vehicle has been phased out service (replaced by the CV90) but units have been resold to other countries.

The Lyran is no longer fitted to CV90 vehicles.

The system was also fitted to the following vehicles now withdrawn from service:

- Centurion main battle tank of the Swedish and Swiss armies
- FV102 Striker of the Belgian army
- Ikv 91 of the Swedish army
- JPK-90 of the Belgian army
- Pbv 302 of the Swedish army
- NM135 of the Norwegian army
- Stridsvagn 103 (S-tank) of the Swedish army

== Specifications ==
The Lyran system has the following specifications

=== Control unit ===
- Weight: 1.25 kg
- Dimensions: 165 x 93 x 83 mm

=== Ordnance Characteristics ===
- Weapon calibre: 71 mm
- Mortar flare shell length: 340 mm (complete)
- Weight: 1.2 kg (complete)
- Muzzle velocity: 114 m/s (147 m/s with increment)
- Ranges: 400, 800 and 1,300 m (short barrel) 450, 950 and 1,600 m (long barrel)
- Time of flight: 5.5s to 400 m (short barrel) or 450 m (long barrel); 11.5s to 800 m (short barrel) or 950 m (long barrel); 16s to 1,300 m (short barrel) or 1,600 m (long barrel)
- Luminous intensity: mean 600,000 cd
- Illumination area: over 600 m (within 5 lux)
- Burning time: 30 seconds
- Descending speed: 3 m/s
- Temperature limits: -40 °C to +60 °C

=== Launcher ===
- Weight: 17 kg (short barrel); 17.95 kg (long barrel)
- Barrel length(long): 910mm
- Voltage: 24V DC
- Elevation settings: steps of 5°
- Length and width of baseplate: 205x110mm

== Other uses ==
In 1990 the journal Shipbuilding Technology International published an article whereby the authors proposed that the Lyran mortar could be utilised within the maritime industry, especially for maritime law enforcement in the prevention of pollution and illegal dumping, smuggling interdiction and for rescue work. It has since been adopted by the German Coast Guard.

== Future Developments ==
Bofors Weapon Systems, the division within Bofors AB that developed the Lyran system previously announced it was developing an infrared (IR) illuminating composite shell for the Lyran, but following the purchase of Bofors AB by Saab AB in 1999, there were no further announcements by the new company, Saab Bofors Dynamics, as to this proposed development.

In September 2000 United Defence Industries (UDI) purchased Bofors Weapons Systems from Saab Bofors Dynamics. Saab have since reorganised and responsibility for their land weapons systems now resides with the division (Saab) Dynamics, and as at February 2020 the product no longer appears on that company's website. In 2005 BAE Systems acquired UDI, now the parent company of Bofors Weapon Systems, to form BAE Systems Bofors AB, with a division Weapon Systems Sweden (Bofors), and as at February 2020 the product no longer appears on that company's website.

In 2004 BAE Systems acquired Hägglunds Vehicle AB, the designer of the CV90, to become BAE Systems Hägglunds AB and now market this vehicle. In February 2018 BAE Systems announced the latest version of the CV90, the Mark IV, and product literature no longer mentions the Lyran mortar, and in photos this no longer appears where it was previously mounted on the rear of the turret.

It, therefore, seems that the Lyran mortar is now an obsolete system (in military use) and is no longer fitted to current combat vehicles.
