= HNoMS Rask =

Two Royal Norwegian Navy patrol boats have been named Rask (quick).

- HNoMS Rask (1887) - a 2.-class torpedo boat launched in 1887.
- HNoMS Rask (P983) - a Snøgg-class patrol boat
