= Hauk-class patrol boat =

Ship class

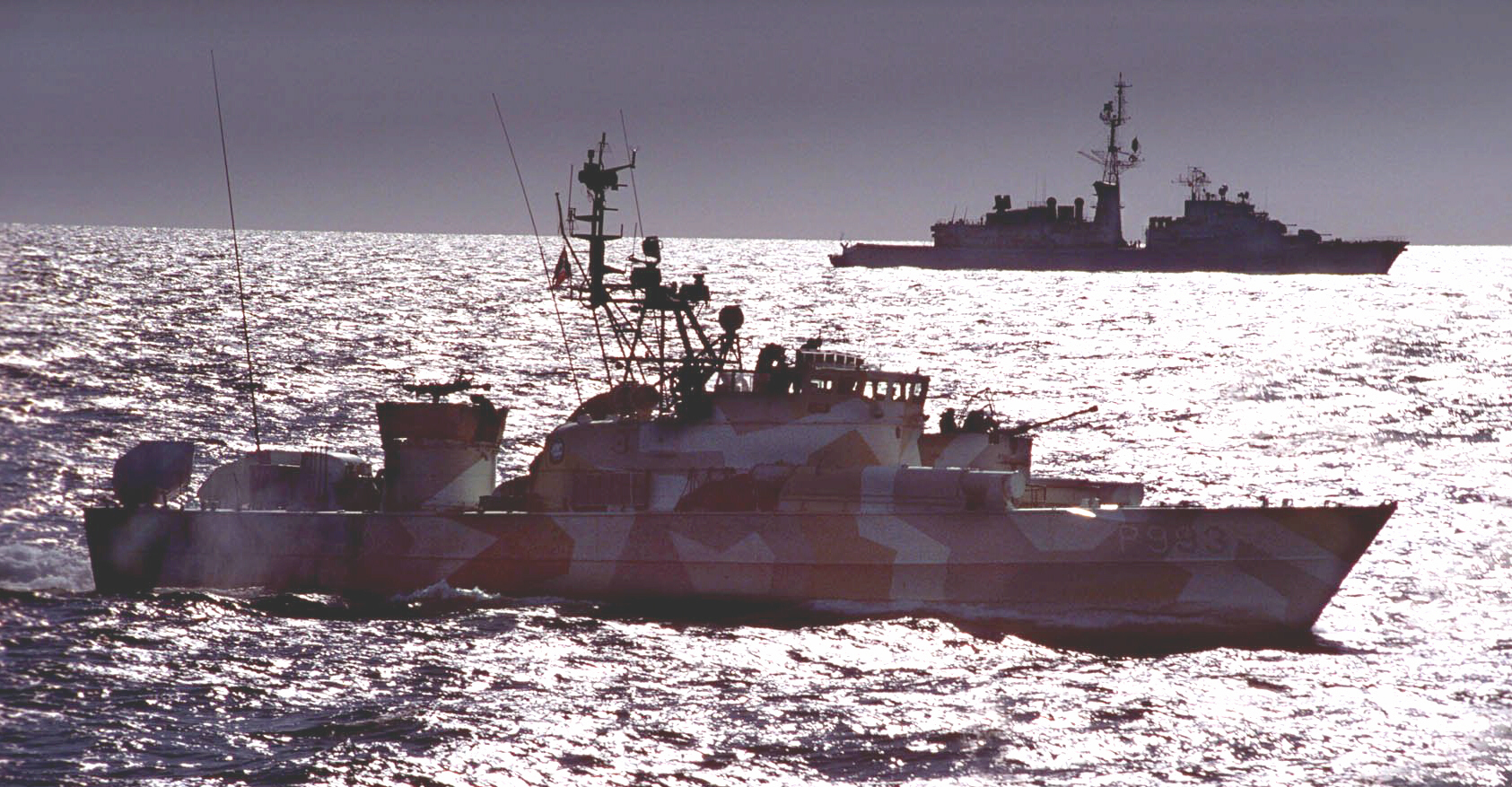
- The Hauk-class MTB HNoMS Lom

Class overview
- Name: Hauk
- Builders: Bergens Mek Verksteder, Westamarin A/S, Alta
- Operators: Royal Norwegian Navy
- Succeeded by: Skjold class
- Subclasses: Super-Hauk
- In commission: 1977–2008
- Planned: 14
- Completed: 14
- Retired: 14
- Scrapped: 14

General characteristics
- Type: Patrol boat and MTB
- Displacement: 120 tons standard, 160 tons full load
- Length: 36.5 m (119 ft 9 in)
- Beam: 6.2 m (20 ft 4 in)
- Draught: 1.8 m (5 ft 11 in)
- Propulsion: 2 × MTU 16V 538 TB92 diesels 3,600 hp (2,700 kW) each, two shafts = 7,200 hp (5,400 kW)
- Speed: 32.5 knots (60.2 km/h; 37.4 mph)
- Range: 440 mi (710 km) at 30 knots (56 km/h; 35 mph)
- Complement: 24 (including 6 officers)
- Sensors & processing systems: Surface search/navigation: 2 × Litton radars (I-band); Weapons control: Kongsberg MSI-80S or Sagem VIGY-20 optronic director; Combat data systems: DCN SENIT 2000 (from late 2001) and Link 11; Others: EO-sensor
- Armament: 6 × Mk 2 Penguin SSMs, Twin Simbad launcher for Matra Mistral and Manpad SAMs, 1 × Bofors 40 mm L/70 gun, 2 × TP 613 torpedo tubes, 2 × 12.7mm Browning M2HB HMGs

The Hauk-class patrol boats were a series of Norwegian fast attack craft. Hauk means hawk in Norwegian. They were ordered in the 1970s and the first boat, Hauk, was commissioned on 17 August 1977. Designed as a development of the Storm and Snøgg classes, by Lieutenant commander (later Captain) Harald Henriksen, the 14 Hauk-class vessels made up the Coastal Combat Flotilla, responsible for protecting the rugged coastline of Norway. The ships were modernized frequently and in their later form were known as "Super-Hauks." The Royal Norwegian Navy deployed four of these warships for anti-terror patrol in the Strait of Gibraltar.

To ensure that their capability met contemporary standards the Hauk-class boats were modernized to Super-Hauk standard with the arrival of the new and more modern Skjold-class MTBs. This modernization included incorporation of the Senit 8 CMS, Link 11 (receive only), modifications of the Penguin missiles and upgrades to the navigation equipment.

All the boats were decommissioned by 2008.

== International operations ==
The vessels were used as escort for allied vessels through the Strait of Gibraltar as part of Operation Active Endeavour. The Norwegian contribution consisted of 21 MTB Squadron and its four vessels. The squadron was stationed in Cádiz along with two Danish vessels of Flyvefisken class. The mission lasted from April to October 2003, and the vessels were widely praised for their efforts.

In November 2006, the vessels were probably once called for international duty when 22 MTB squadron became part of UNIFIL II – a maritime UN contributions in the coastal area outside Lebanon that would prevent arms smuggling in the area. The vessels were stationed in Limassol, Cyprus.

== Hugin Class ==
Sweden had a parallel development of their own Norwegian built patrol boats in the Hugin-class, the hulls are the same as the Hauk class. Both classes where built by the same Norwegian shipyard simultaneously.

== Vessels ==
- Hauk (P986) - commissioned 17 August 1977
- Ørn (P987) - commissioned 19 January 1979
- Terne (P988) - commissioned 13 March 1979
- Tjeld (P989) - commissioned 25 May 1979
- Skarv (P990) - commissioned 17 July 1979
- Teist (P991) - commissioned 11 September 1979
- Jo (P992) - commissioned 1 November 1979
- Lom (P993) - commissioned 15 January 1980
- Stegg (P994) - commissioned 18 March 1980
- Falk (P995) - commissioned 30 April 1980
- Ravn (P996) - commissioned 20 May 1980
- Gribb (P997) - commissioned July 1980
- Geir (P998) - commissioned 16 September 1980
- Erle (P999) - commissioned 10 December 1980

== Gallery ==
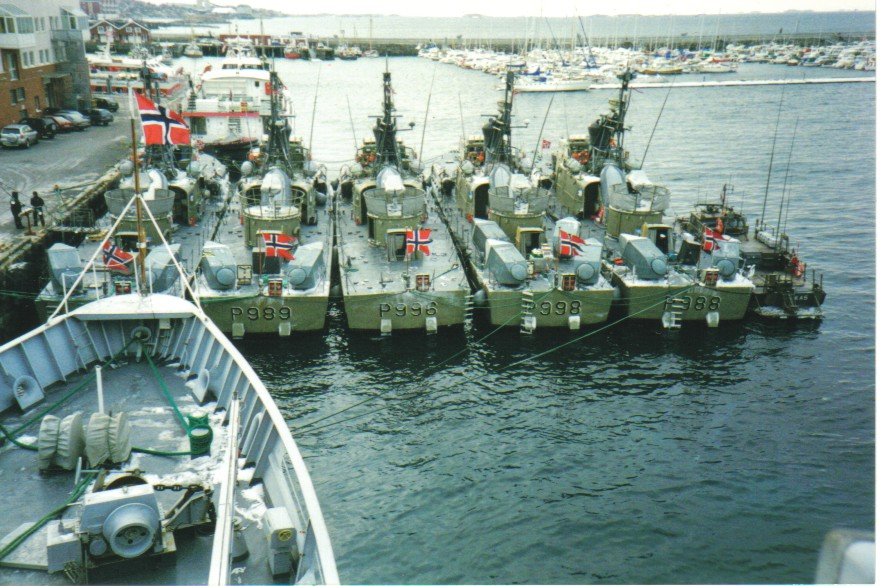
Five Hauk-class patrol boats at quay in 2001, viewed from HNoMS Horten. To right of the Hauk-class vessels is a CB90-class fast assault craft.

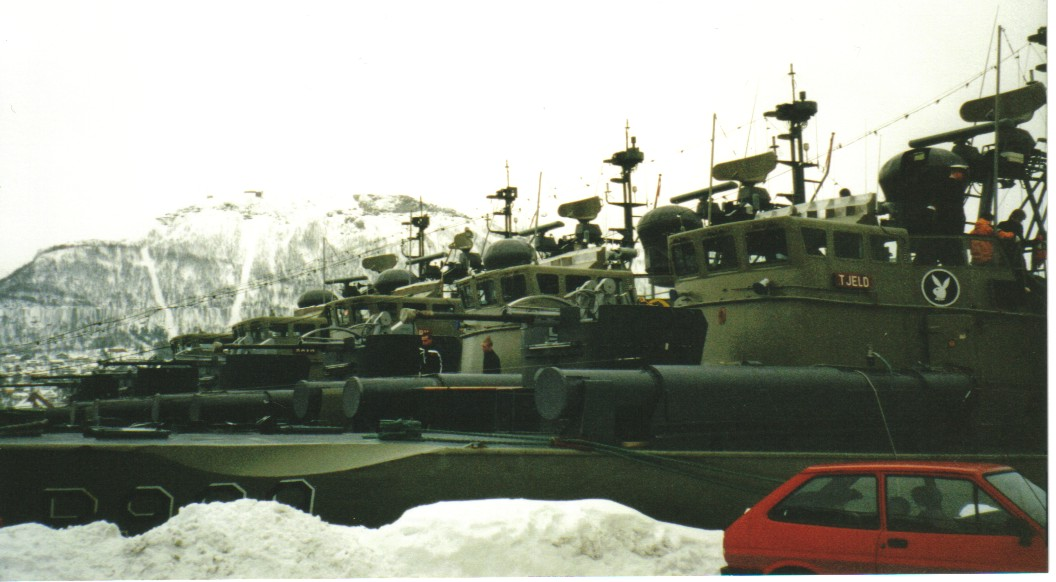
Hauk-class patrol boats at quay in 2001

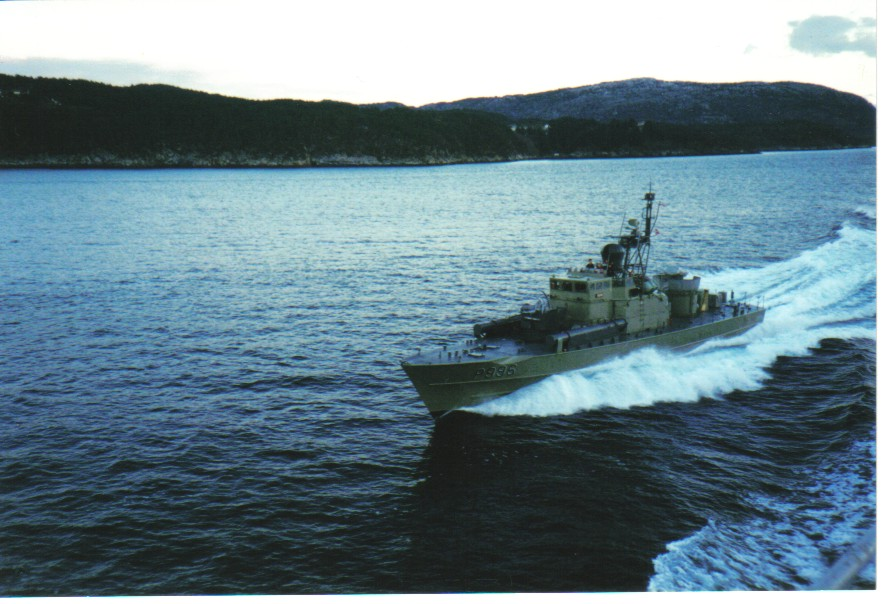
HNoMS Ravn passing HNoMS Horten

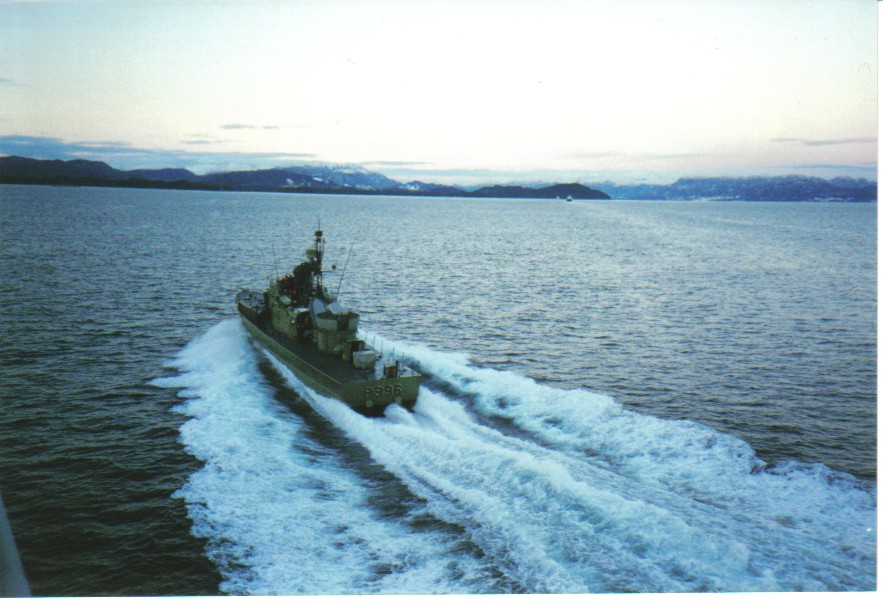
HNoMS Ravn passing HNoMS Horten

== See also ==
- List of Royal Norwegian Navy ships
