= HNoMS Utsira =

HNoMS Utsira may refer to one of the following submarines of the Royal Norwegian Navy:

- HNoMS Utsira (P85), a British V-class submarine, was to be HMS Variance
- HNoMS Utsira (1965), a Kobben-class submarine launched in 1965 and scrapped in 1998
- HNoMS Utsira (1991), an Ula-class submarine launched in 1991 and in active service
