= Latvian patrol boat Linga =

Patrol boat

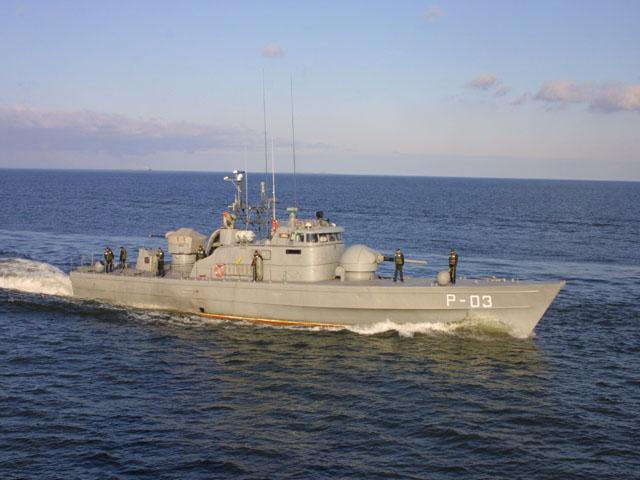
- Linga, November 2002

History

Latvia
- Name: Linga (P-03)
- Launched: 18 August 1967
- Acquired: 2001
- Decommissioned: 25 May 2012

General characteristics
- Displacement: 138 long tons (140 t)
- Length: 36.5 m (120 ft)
- Beam: 6.2 m (20 ft)
- Draught: 1.8 m (5 ft 11 in)
- Propulsion: 2 × Maybach diesel engines producing 7,200 hp (5,369 kW)
- Speed: 30 knots (56 km/h; 35 mph)
- Complement: 24
- Armament: Penguin anti-ship missiles; 1 × 76mm Bofors TAK 76 cannon; 1 × Bofors 40 mm L/60 cannon

Linga (hull number P-03) was a Storm class patrol boat of the Latvian Naval Forces. It was built in Bergen, Norway, in 1967–1968 and originally served in the Royal Norwegian Navy under the name HNoMS Gnist.

After an agreement between the Latvian and Norwegian governments the ship became part of the Latvian Naval Forces and it arrived in Liepāja on June 9, 2001. It has a length of 36.5 metres, width of 6.2 metres, is equipped with twin MTU MD 16 V538 TB90 engines and has a total power of 7200 hp.

After almost eleven years of service in Latvian Naval Forces, she was decommissioned on May 25, 2012. All former COs were present at the ceremony.
