= Mågerø =

Peninsula in Færder Municipality, Norway

- Peninsula
- Interactive map of Mågerø
- Coordinates: 59.1517°N 10.43589°E
- Location: Vestfold, Norway
- Part of: Tjøme
- Water bodies: Ytre Oslofjord
- Elevation: 28 m (92 ft)

Mågerø is a small peninsula in Færder Municipality in Vestfold county, Norway. The peninsula is located on the northeast shore of the large island of Tjøme, about 15 kilometres (9.3 mi) south of the city of Tønsberg.

The peninsula is a part of a popular Norwegian summer vacation area and the location of the Royal Norwegian Air Force control and alert station for the southern part of Norway. The Norwegian royal family have their private summer residence, also known as Mågerø, located on the peninsula. The royal home is entirely located in a restricted military area.
