= NM135 =

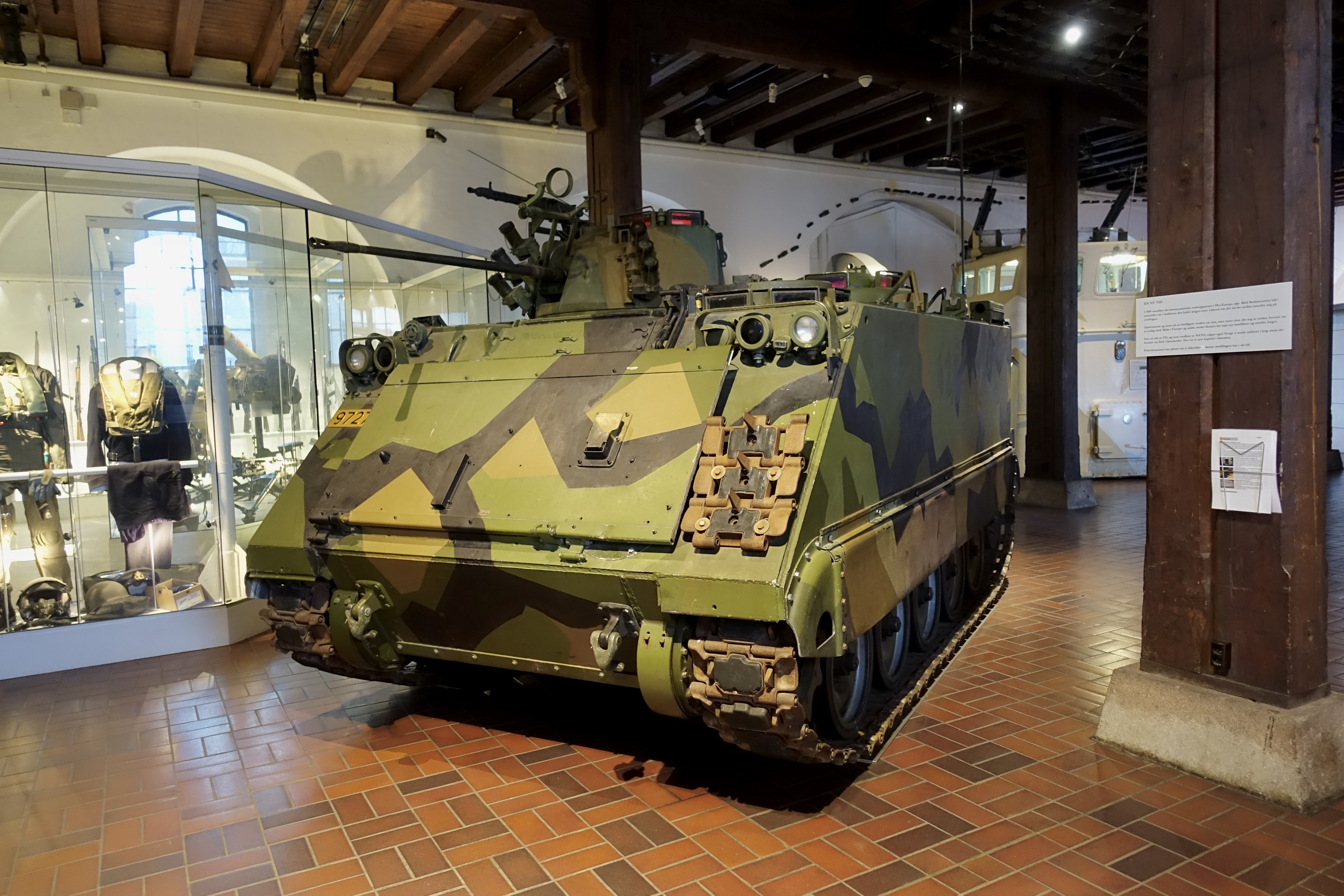
- NM135
- Type: Infantry fighting vehicle
- Place of origin: Norway

Service history
- Used by: Norway

Specifications
- Mass: 11.7 metric tons (unladen)
- Length: 5.26 m
- Width: 2.82 m
- Height: 1.83 m (hull top)
- Crew: 3+8 troops
- Armor: Aluminium hull
- Main armament: Rheinmetall Mk 20 RH-202 20mm cannon (505 rounds)
- Secondary armament: Rheinmetall MG3 machine gun (750 rounds); 71mm LYRAN mortar (10 rounds)
- Engine: Detroit Diesel 6V53; 212 hp (158 kW)
- Transmission: Allison TX-100-1
- Suspension: Torsion bar
- Ground clearance: 42 cm (17 in)
- Fuel capacity: 360 L (95 US gallons)
- Operational range: 480 km (300 mi)
- Maximum speed: 64 km/h (40 mph), road 40 km/h (25 mph), off-road 5.5 km/h (3.4 mph), swimming

The NM135 Stormpanservogn is a Norwegian tracked light armoured vehicle (LAV). It is variant of the American M113 armoured personnel carrier (APC), armed with a 20mm cannon in a rotating turret.

Developed by the Norwegian Army in the 1980s, it is no longer in active service.

== Background ==
Although originally intended as a lightly armoured, self-propelled anti-aircraft weapon system, the NM135 was utilised as a mechanised infantry fighting vehicle (IFV) to transport Stormer troops and in the armed reconnaissance role. First entering service in the early-mid 1980s, it remained in operation until the introduction of the Hägglund CV9030N in the late 1990s and was progressively withdrawn from service in the 2000s.

== Design ==
=== Layout ===
The NM135's primary modification from a standard M113 is the replacement of the commander's cupola with a one-man rotating and powered turret originally made by Hägglund and Söner for the Swedish Pansarbandvagn 302 (Pbv 302) APC. The 20mm Hispano-Suiza cannon on the Pbv 302 was replaced with a 20mm Rheinmetall cannon. A vertical bank of three smoke grenade launchers are fitted to each side of the turret. Conversion and fitting of the turret was undertaken in Norway.

The NM135 featured a 3-man crew – driver, gunner and commander. The driver was located in the front left in the same position as a standard M113 and featured the usual arrangement of four vision blocks but with the central optical block replaced with a passive IR block. The driver's hatch was hinged and opened to the right (on a standard M113 the hatch opens to the rear) so as not to impede the commander's cupola. Behind the driver's hatch was located the commander's non-rotatable cupola, which featured vision blocks but no armament. The commander's hatch was hinged and opened to the rear. To the right of the commander's cupola was located the Hägglund turret manned by the vehicle's gunner.

Due to size constraints imposed by fitting of the turret, the available space in the troop compartment of a standard M113 was reduced in the NM135, and a maximum of eight troops could be carried.

=== Armament ===
The NM135 has as its primary armament a non-stabilised Rheinmetall mk20 RH-202 20mm autocannon mounted off-centre to the right of the Hägglund and Söner turret. This weapon fires 20 x 139 mm ammunition with a rate of fire of around 900 rounds per minute and features a ballistic computer to assist the gunner in aiming using the weapon's optical and passive IR sights.

The turret was also fitted with a Rheinmetall MG3 7.62mm general purpose machine gun mounted coaxially above the 20mm cannon, Firing NATO 7.62×51mm ammunition with a rate of fire of 1,000-1,300 rounds per minute to provide infantry support fire and for use against lightly armoured vehicles and other 'soft-skinned' targets. A 71 mm LYRAN mortar is also fitted at the rear of the turret which along with illumination rounds could also fire high-explosive / anti-personnel and smoke rounds.

=== Armour ===
The NM135 has the same level of protection as a standard M113 with the hull being made of rolled 5083/5086 H32 aluminium armour of the following thicknesses:

- Upper front: 38mm at 45 degrees
- Lower front: 38mm at 30 degrees
- Upper sides: 44mm
- Lower sides 32mm
- Rear: 44mm at 9 degrees
- Ramp: 44mm at 8 degrees
- Top: 38mm at 8 degrees
- Floor: 32mm at 90 degrees

In 1996 additional appliqué armour (HF9Sp, HS6Sp) was added to the vehicle front and sides for some vehicles deployed on active duty to Bosnia with IFOR. This increased the nominal vehicle weight from 11.7 tons to 12.2 tons, and load capacity was reduced from 1,200 kg to 950 kg

=== Drivetrain ===
The NM135 is equipped with a Detroit Diesel 6V53 non-turbocharged two-cycle diesel engine rated at 212 hp (158 kW) from the M113A1, driving through an Allison TX-100-1 automatic transmission with three forward and one reverse gears. In 1997 the suspension, cooling system, and final drives were updated to M113A2 standards.

=== Mobility ===
The NM135 used the T130E1 rubber-padded steel tracks as fitted to a standard M113A1, with 128 track links per vehicle (64 links per track). However, late in its service life (around 2003–04) some vehicles were equipped with Soucy rubber band-tracks for improved cross-country performance in snow and ice (these were the same tracks as fitted to Norwegian M113s deployed to Afghanistan in 2004).

== Production history ==
Conversion of fifty-three (53) M113A1 APC to NM135 IFV commenced in 1981–1982. Although the turrets were of Swedish manufacture conversion of and fitting to the M113 hull took place in Norway, at a unit cost of $183,088–$184,389. All vehicles were issued to the Norwegian army - none were exported to foreign operators.

== Operational history ==
Following the restructuring of its army in 1989, Norway's fifty-three NM135s were deployed across the country to NATO units under Norwegian command as follows:

=== Allied Forces North Norway (NON) ===
The 1st Armoured Battalion (Brigade Nord) featured a mechanised company of Stormer (rifle) squadrons with NM135s in the role of infantry fighting vehicles to support the Leopard I MBTs, as well as a reconnaissance squadron of four NM135s assigned at the battalion level to the support company. Total 29 vehicles.

=== Allied Forces South Norway (SONOR) ===
A reconnaissance squadron each of three vehicles was assigned to 1, 3, 7, 8, 12 and 13 Brigades. Total eighteen vehicles.

A reconnaissance squadron each of three vehicles was assigned to Brigade Sør-Norge and Brigade Vestlandet. Total six vehicles.

=== Withdrawal from service ===
Commencing from the introduction of the CV90 in 1999 the NM135 was progressively withdrawn from service as units upgraded to the new vehicle. By 2009 no NM135s remained in active service.

== Variants ==
- NM135F1—fitted with additional spall-liners.
