= HNoMS Snøgg =

Several Royal Norwegian Navy ships and a class of torpedo boats have been named Snøgg.

- HNoMS Snøgg (1919) - a torpedo boat built in 1919 and captured by the Germans during the German invasion of Norway in 1940.
- The Snøgg-class missile torpedo boats - Six vessels built in 1970 and 1971.
- A Snøgg-class missile torpedo boat HNoMS Snøgg (P980) which was in service from 1970 to 1994.
