= HNoMS Horten =

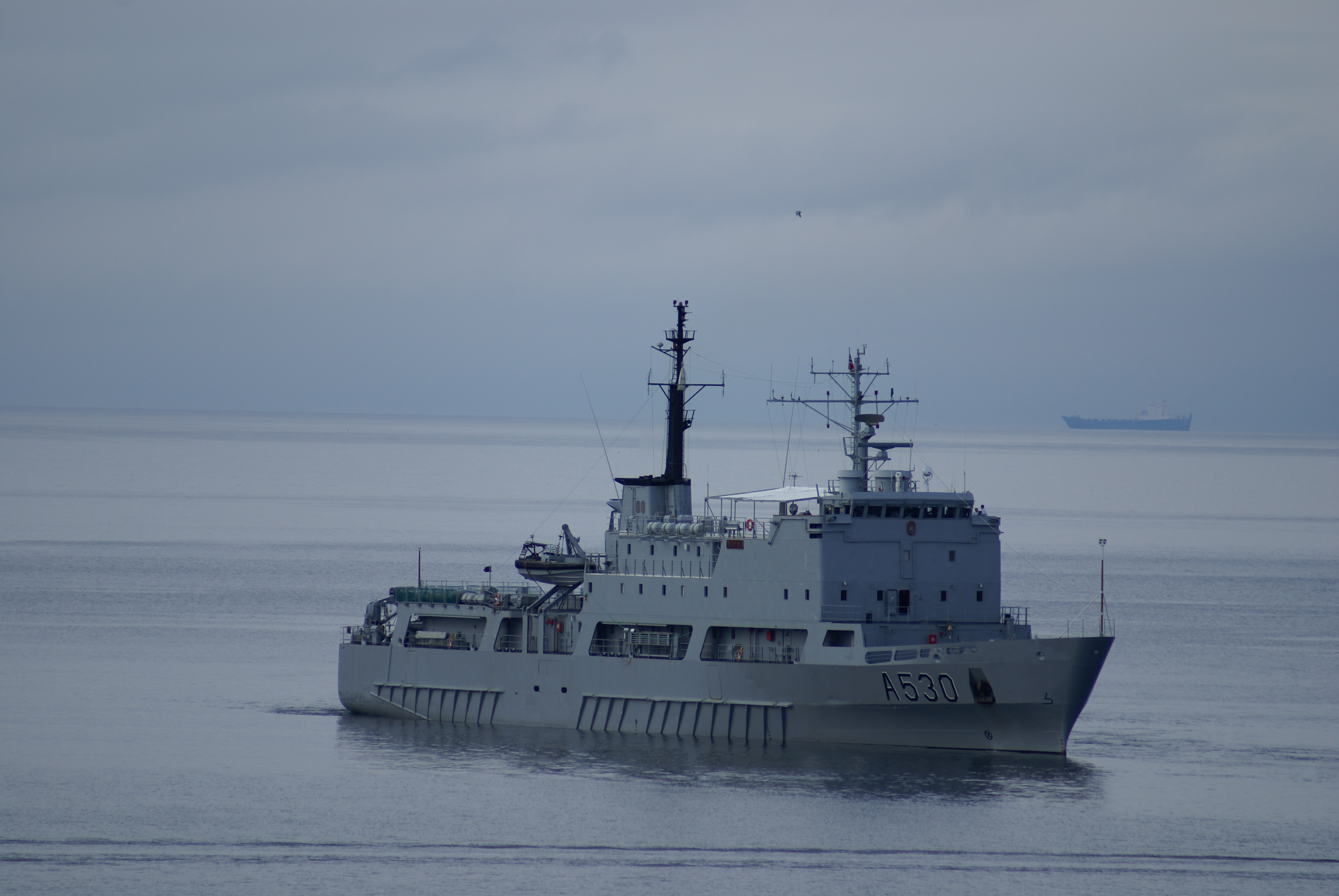

History

Norway
- Name: Horten
- Namesake: Port town of Horten
- Builder: The Royal Norwegian Navy's shipyard at Horten
- Laid down: 28 January 1977
- Launched: 12 August 1977
- Commissioned: 9 June 1978
- Decommissioned: 11 June 2008
- Identification: IMO number: 8746806; MMSI number: 671496000; Callsign: 5VCV5
- Fate: Sold

General characteristics
- Displacement: 2,535 tons full load
- Length: 87.4 m (286.75 ft)
- Beam: 13.0 m (42.65 ft)
- Draft: 4.86 m (15.94 ft)
- Propulsion: Two 4,200 HP diesel engines
- Speed: 16 knots (29.63 km/h)
- Complement: 86 men
- Armament: 2 × Bofors 40 mm guns, depth charges
- Notes: IMO 6127047

HNoMS Horten (A530) was a Norwegian support vessel built at Karljohansvern in Horten, the city from which the ship was named, in 1977. She was in service with the Royal Norwegian Navy until her retirement in 2008 and filled a number of roles while in service.

After being sold in 2012, the Horten is currently (2014) employed as a fishery patrol vessel in Nigeria, supporting the fleet of fast patrol boats sold along with her.

== Norwegian Navy ==
Horten was originally designed as a support craft for submarines and fast attack craft. After a change in the design, which shortened the vessel and gave her smaller torpedo stores than originally intended, this role was reduced. Rather than supplying smaller ships with ordnance, Horten functioned primarily as support craft with regards to food, fuel and water – in some cases, the on-board facilities were also made available to crews visiting from smaller ships. Horten was known as a spacious vessel – privates had four-man cabins, leading privates had two-man cabins and some petty officers had single cabins. Commissioned officers had cabins of a high standard and the captain a large, separate cabin with top facilities. There were also guest quarters for high-ranking officers on the same deck as the captain's quarters. The officers also had a separate mess hall with a bar. In 1985, the ship served as yacht for King Olav V whilst the royal yacht HNoMY Norge was repaired after a fire earlier that year. Part of the reason for this choice was the ship's excellent facilities.

From 1986, Horten was laid up. When returning to service in 1989, she was converted to a training ship in the "School squadron", along with HNoMS Hessa and HNoMS Vigra. The facilities on board and the size of the vessel ensured that academy cadets could get experience with navigation and command in addition to normal schooling. The ship continued to function in this role intermittently throughout the 1990s and into the early 2000s, as well as serving as a support vessel.

During naval exercises in the early 2000s, such as "Blue Game", the ship functioned as command vessel for NATO officers responsible for overseeing the exercise. During 2005–08, Horten primarily functioned as living and training centre for the crews of the new Nansen class frigates. She had previously served as training ship for frigate crews in 2001, while the Trondheim was being repaired after a boiler failure.

Horten was decommissioned in 2008, after many years of discussion and postponement due to the lack of a suitable replacement. Due to Norway's strict export restrictions on dual-use military goods, and the wish of the Norwegian Defence Logistics Organisation (FLO) of the Ministry of Defence to sell her along with six retired (initially still armed) Hauk-class patrol boats, the sale of the ship turned out to be a lengthy and difficult process.

== Sale to Nigeria ==
After several failed attempts to complete a sale by the FLO, in 2012 Horten and the by-then-demilitarised patrol boats were sold to British company CAS-Global Ltd on the basis that, although they were contracted to the Nigerian Maritime Administration and Safety Agency (NIMASA), they would be operating under UK flag and regulatory control. After delays, during which the patrol boats were delivered, in February 2014 the new owner brought Horten to Ramsgate, England, where she was detained by the Maritime and Coastguard Agency over registration and technical issues. CAS-Global's UK export licence application falsely claimed that the ship had been sold from Norway direct to Global West Vessel Specialist Agency, Nigeria and she would be operated by the Nigerian Navy; Global West was connected to the Nigerian former warlord Tompolo.

As a consequence of investigative reporting by the Oslo newspaper Dagbladet, in October 2014 a Norwegian Parliamentary Committee began an investigation of the allegations of illegalities and corruption. Its final report was made in May 2016, confirming that the FLO was aware that the true end-user was Global West, not CAS-Global, but hid that from Government, and were not proactive in trying to prevent the British authorities allowing Horten to be delivered. The responsible official was convicted of taking bribes from CAS-Global and imprisoned.

After the UK export licence was granted, Horten sailed for Nigeria on 20 November 2014 under Togo registration. On arrival in Lagos on 5 December 2014, she was seized due to a Nigerian Navy dispute with NIMASA and Global West. In June 2015, the ship was transferred to Nigerian registration, in ownership of Molecular Power Systems Ltd., Lagos, which was associated with Global West. In September 2016 it was reported that NIMASA had taken over more than 20 vessels from Global West's fleet, including Horten.

== Pictures ==
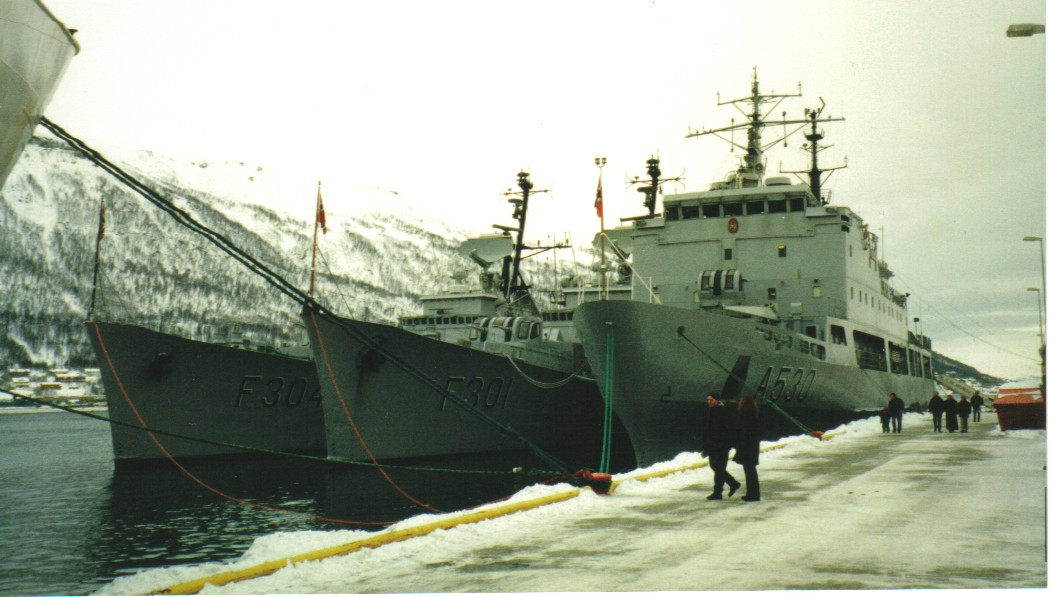
Horten moored alongside the Oslo class frigates Bergen and Narvik in 2001.

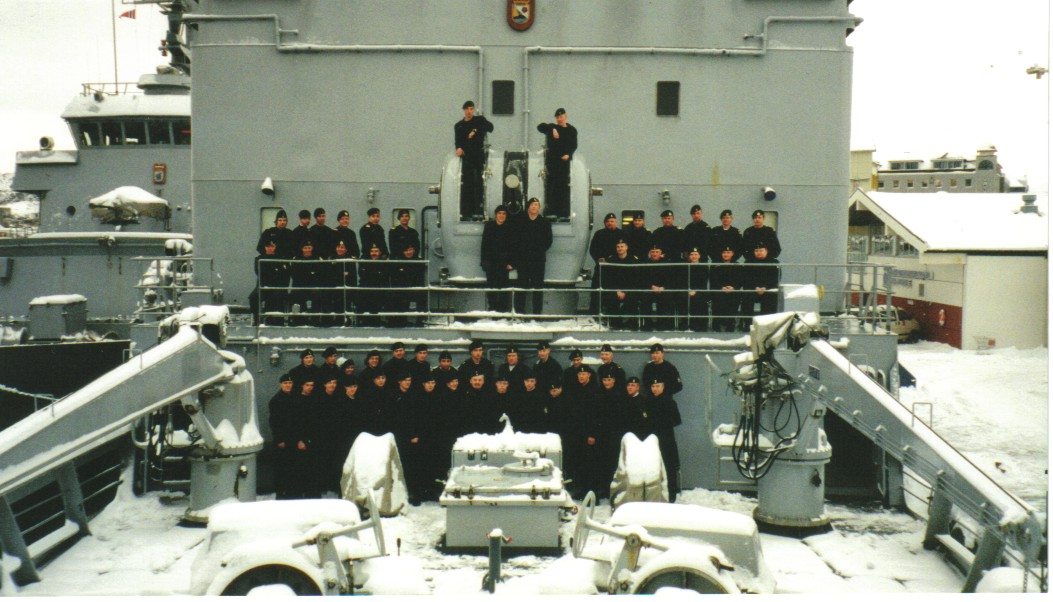
The crew photographed in 2001.

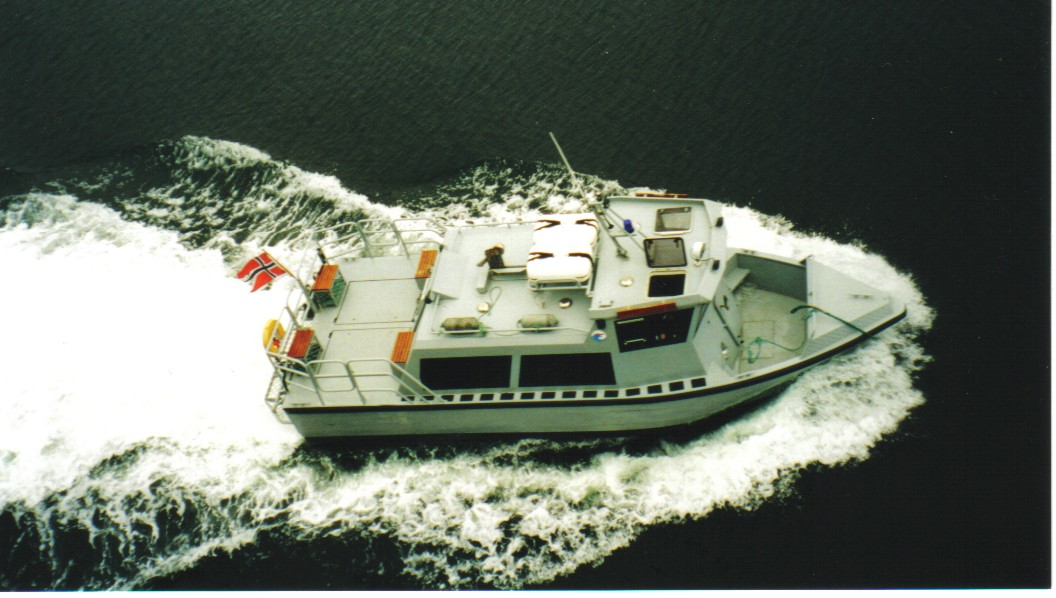
"Junior", one of the ship's two small boats, in 2001.

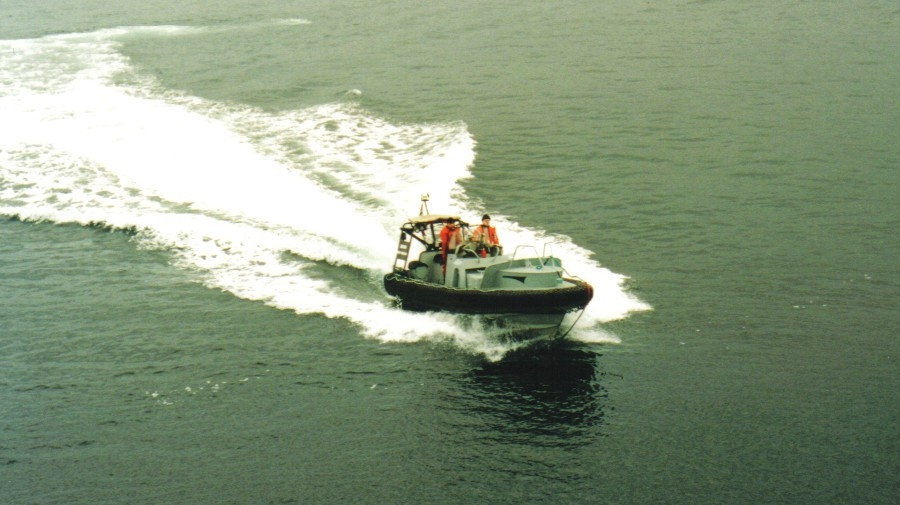
"Sjøbjørn" (sea bear), one of the ship's two small boats, in 2001.

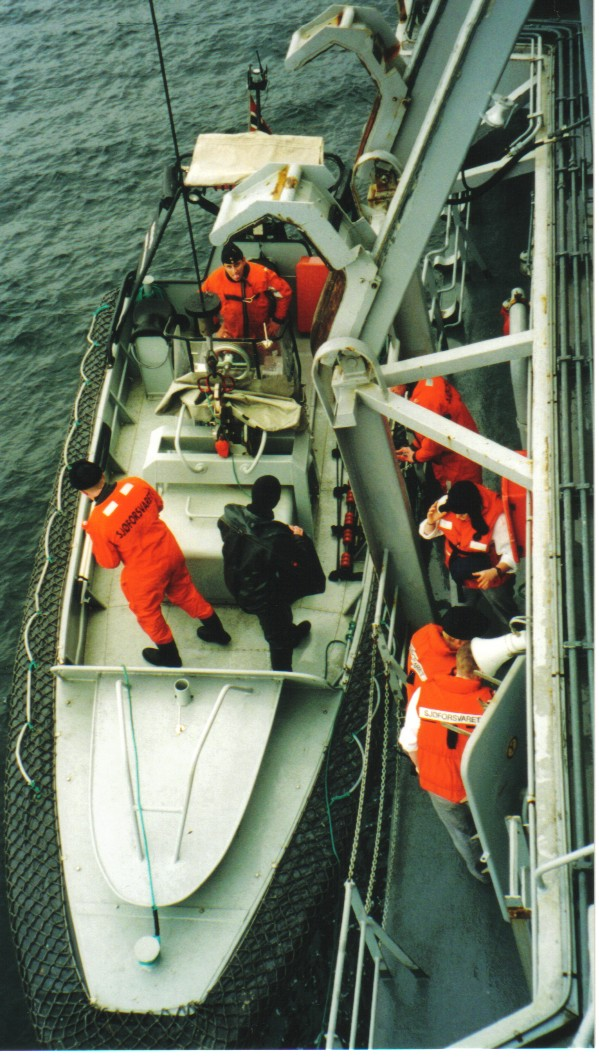
"Sjøbjørn" (sea bear), one of the ship's two small boats, in the davit in 2001.

== Bibliography ==
- Stephen Saunders RN red. (2004). Jane's Fighting Ships 2004-2005, 107. ed., s. 518. Jane’s Information Group Limited. ISBN 0-7106-2623-1.
- Marius Thomassen (1995). 90 år under rent norsk orlogsflagg. ISBN 9788251404839.
