= Storm-class patrol boat =

Vessels of the Norwegian navy

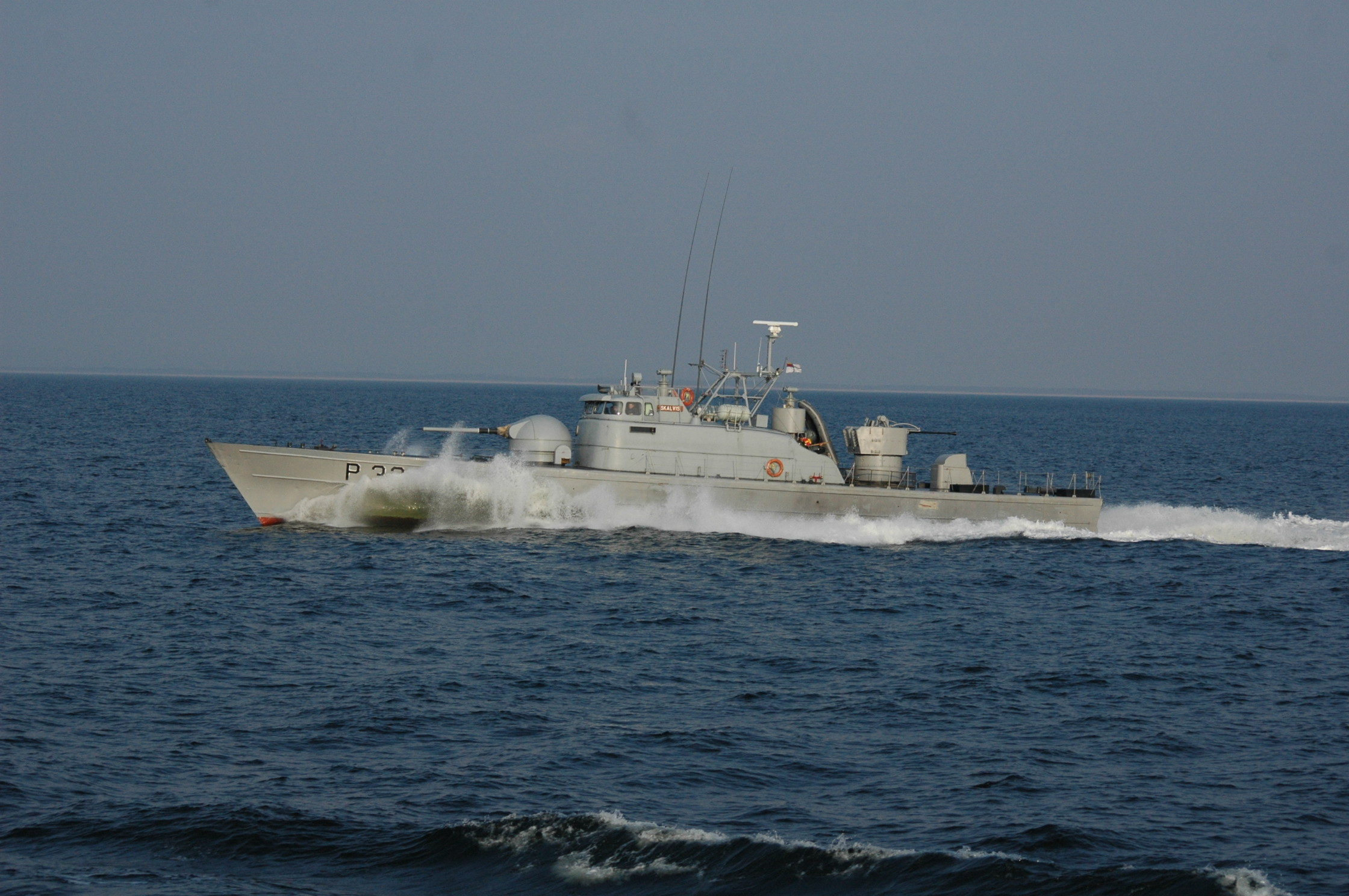
- Lithuanian Navy Skalvis (ex-Norwegian Steil)

Class overview
- Operators: Royal Norwegian Navy; Estonian Navy; Latvian Naval Forces; Lithuanian Naval Force
- Built: 1965–1967
- Completed: 20

General characteristics
- Type: Patrol boat
- Displacement: 138 tons
- Length: 36.5 m (119 ft 9 in)
- Beam: 6.2 m (20 ft 4 in)
- Draught: 1.8 m (5 ft 11 in)
- Propulsion: 2 × Maybach diesel engines (7,200 hp (5,400 kW) total)
- Speed: 30 knots (56 km/h; 35 mph)
- Complement: 19 in Norwegian Navy; 24 in Latvian Navy
- Armament: 6 × Penguin anti-ship missiles; 1 × Bofors 76mm TAK 76 cannon; 1 × Bofors 40 mm L/70 cannon

The Storm-class patrol boat was a series of fast patrol boats (FPB) consisting of 20 vessels built for the Royal Norwegian Navy.

In Norwegian these boats were called missilkanonbåter (MKB) meaning boats with missiles and guns. They were operated by the Coastal Combat Flotilla together with the MTBs, or missile torpedo boats. None of the boats are currently in service with the Royal Norwegian Navy. The design was Norwegian and all of the boats were built by Norwegian ship yards from 1965 to 1967. In the 1990s, Norway donated vessels of the class to Estonia, Latvia and Lithuania where they were eventually retired.

== Design ==
The Storm class was designed by Lieutenant-Commander (later Captain) Harald Henriksen. The same man was also involved in the design of the Rapp-class motor torpedo boats - the first Norwegian-built MTBs. Later, he also designed the Snøgg- and Hauk-class MTBs. Henriksen's wife, Margot Henriksen, christened the first KNM Skjold (P 963), delivered to the Norwegian navy in February 1966 from Westermoen yard in Mandal.

The prototype Storm, completed 31 May 1963, was later scrapped and replaced by a second boat taking the same name and pennant number P960; the last of the class completed in 1968. After 1970 Penguin missiles were fitted to these boats in addition to the original armament.

== Operational history ==
Norway donated a Storm-class vessel each to Estonia and Lithuania and three to Latvia in 1995. In the Lithuanian Navy, the ex-Storm class was designated the Dzūkas class, and in the Latvian Navy, the ex-Storms were designated the Bulta class. Since the 1999 edition of The World Defence Almanac the Storm class has not been listed for the Estonian Navy.

At the end of the 1990s, two vessels were sold to Lithuania and three were sold to Latvia. A further three hulls may have been donated to each of the Baltic countries as spare parts.

The last operator was the Lithuanian Navy which used the two Storm-class boats: Sėlis (transferred 2001) and Skalvis (transferred 2001). Both were decommissioned in 2000s.

== Vessels ==
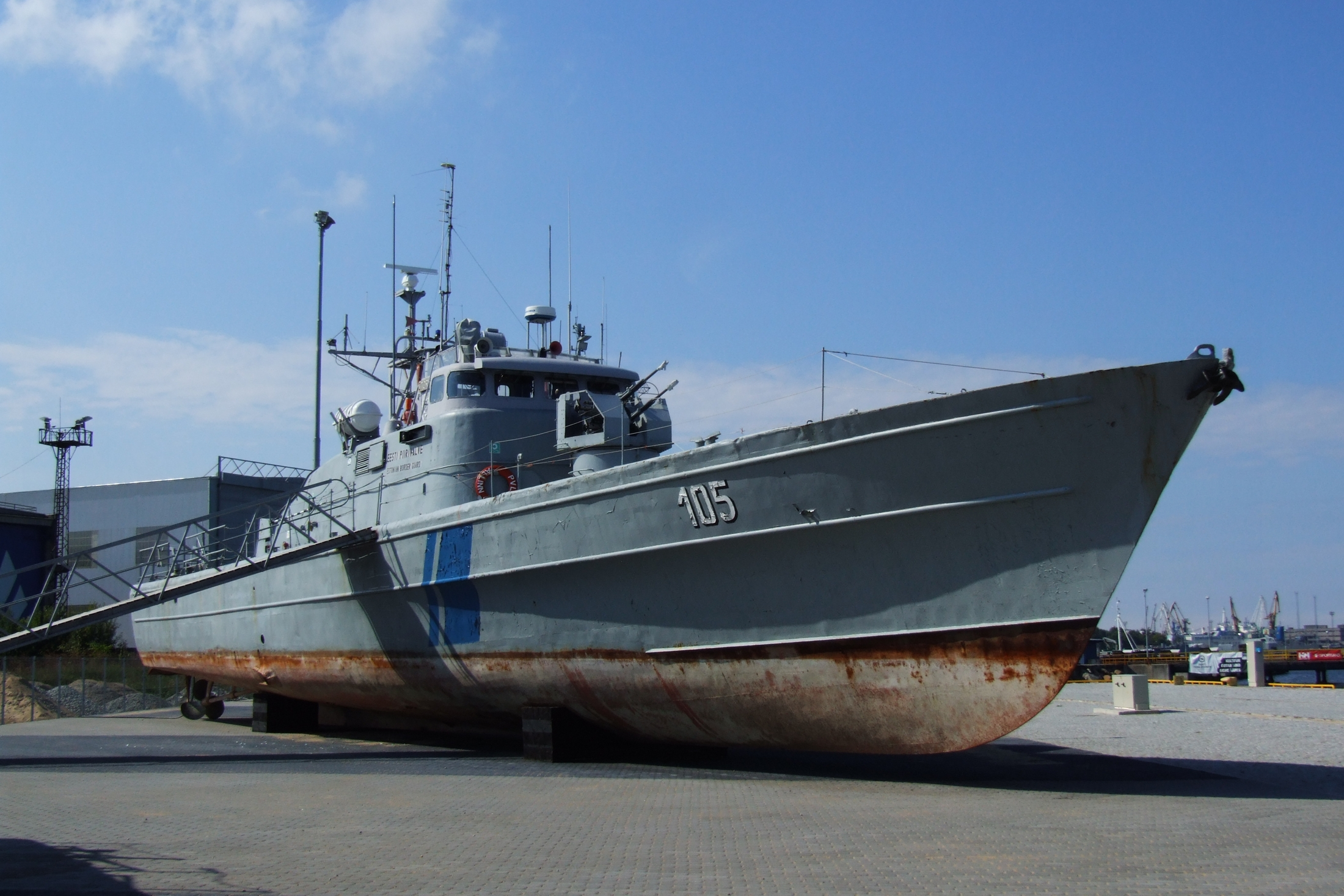
PVL 105 Torm at a museum in Tallinn

The vessels are listed with their pennant numbers in RNoN service:

- Arg P968 (1966-1991) Donated to Estonia. Served with the Estonian Border Guard as Torm, now part of the Estonian Maritime Museum.
- Blink P961 Is on display, fully equipped at the Royal Norwegian Navy Museum in Horten, Norway.
- Brann P970
- Brask P977 Is on display on land at Haakonsvern Naval Base in Bergen.
- Brott P974
- Djerv P966 (1966-2000) Sold to the Latvian Navy and renamed LVNS Zibens (Latvia) (decommissioned).
- Glimt P962
- Gnist P979 (1967-2000) Sold to the Latvian Navy and renamed LVNS Linga (Latvia) (decommissioned)
- Hvass P972 (1966-2000) Sold to the Latvian Navy and renamed LVNS Lode (Latvia) (decommissioned).
- Kjekk P965 (1966-2000) Donated to the Lithuanian Navy and renamed LNS P31 Dzūkas (Lithuania) (decommissioned).
- Odd P975
- Pil P976 Previously used as a damage control and fire fighting training vessel. Placed on land at Haakonsvern Naval base.
- Rokk P978
- Skjold P963
- Skudd P967 (1966-2000) Sold to the Lithuanian Navy and renamed LNS Sėlis (Lithuania) (decommissioned).
- Steil P969 (1967-2000) Sold to the Lithuanian Navy and renamed LNS Skalvis (Lithuania) (decommissioned).
- Storm P960
- Traust P973 (1967-1994) Donated to the Latvian Navy and renamed LVNS Bulta (Latvia) (decommissioned).
- Tross P971
- Trygg P964

== Gallery ==
=== HNoMS Blink P961 - Outside ===
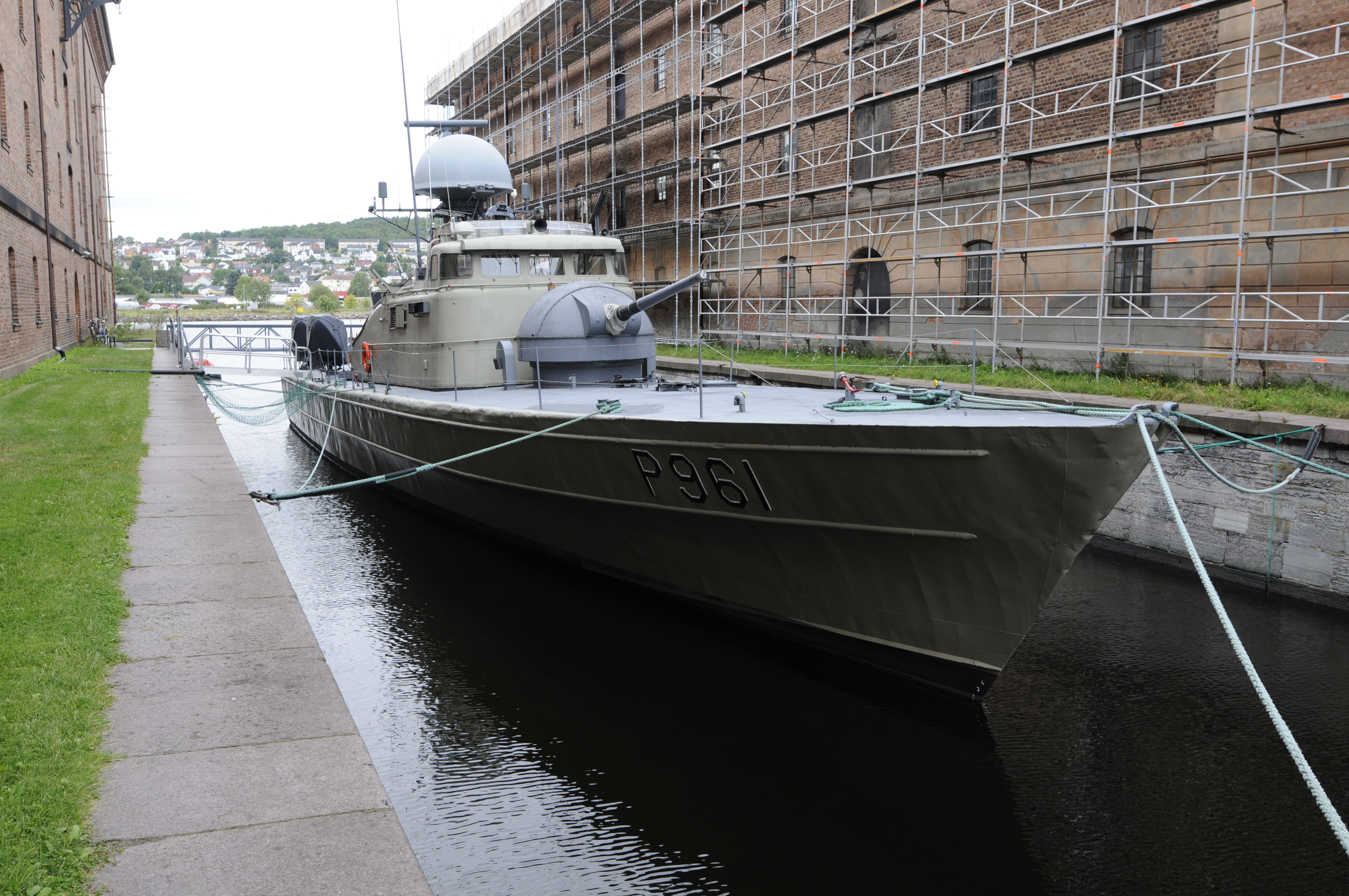

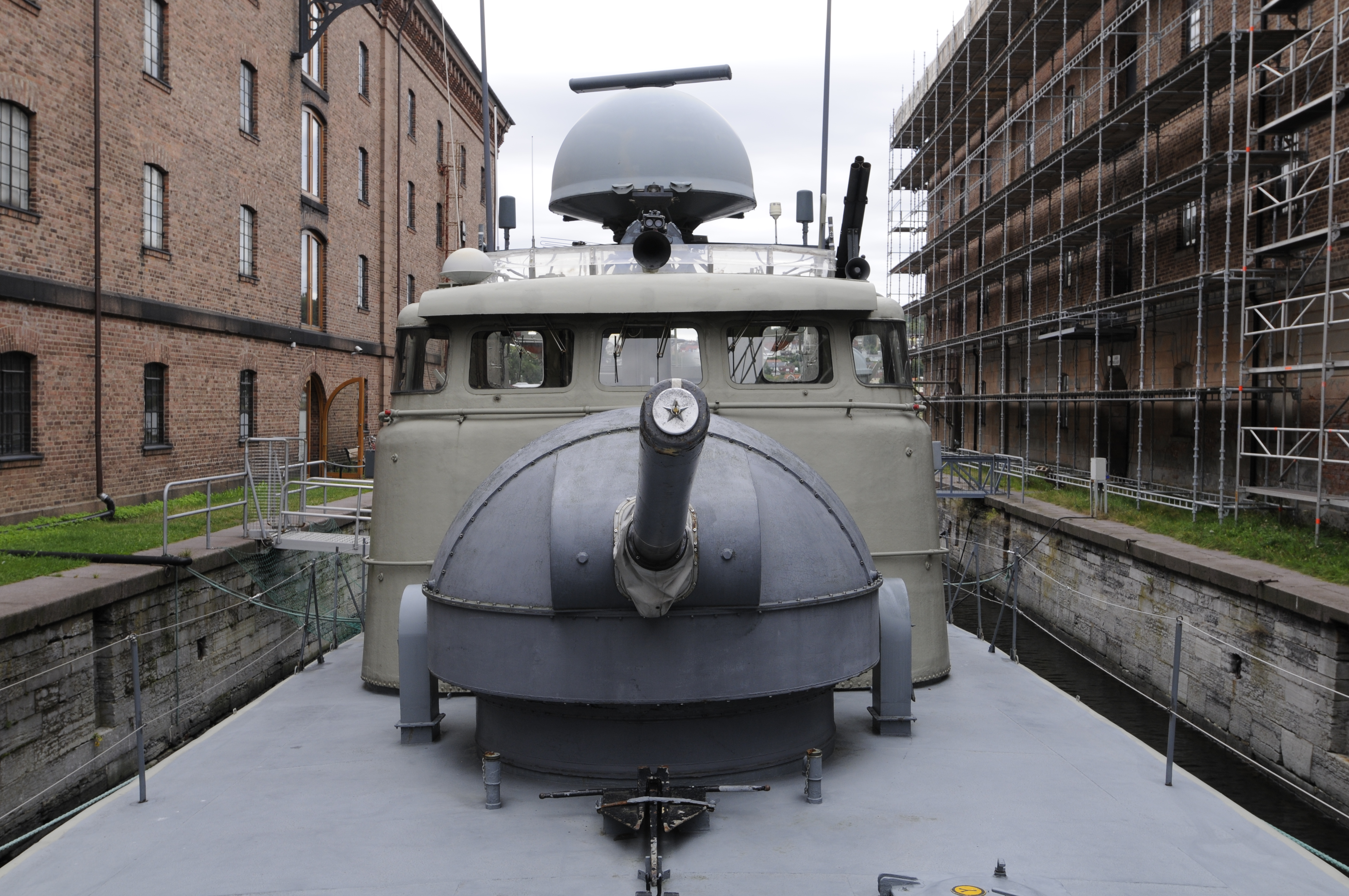

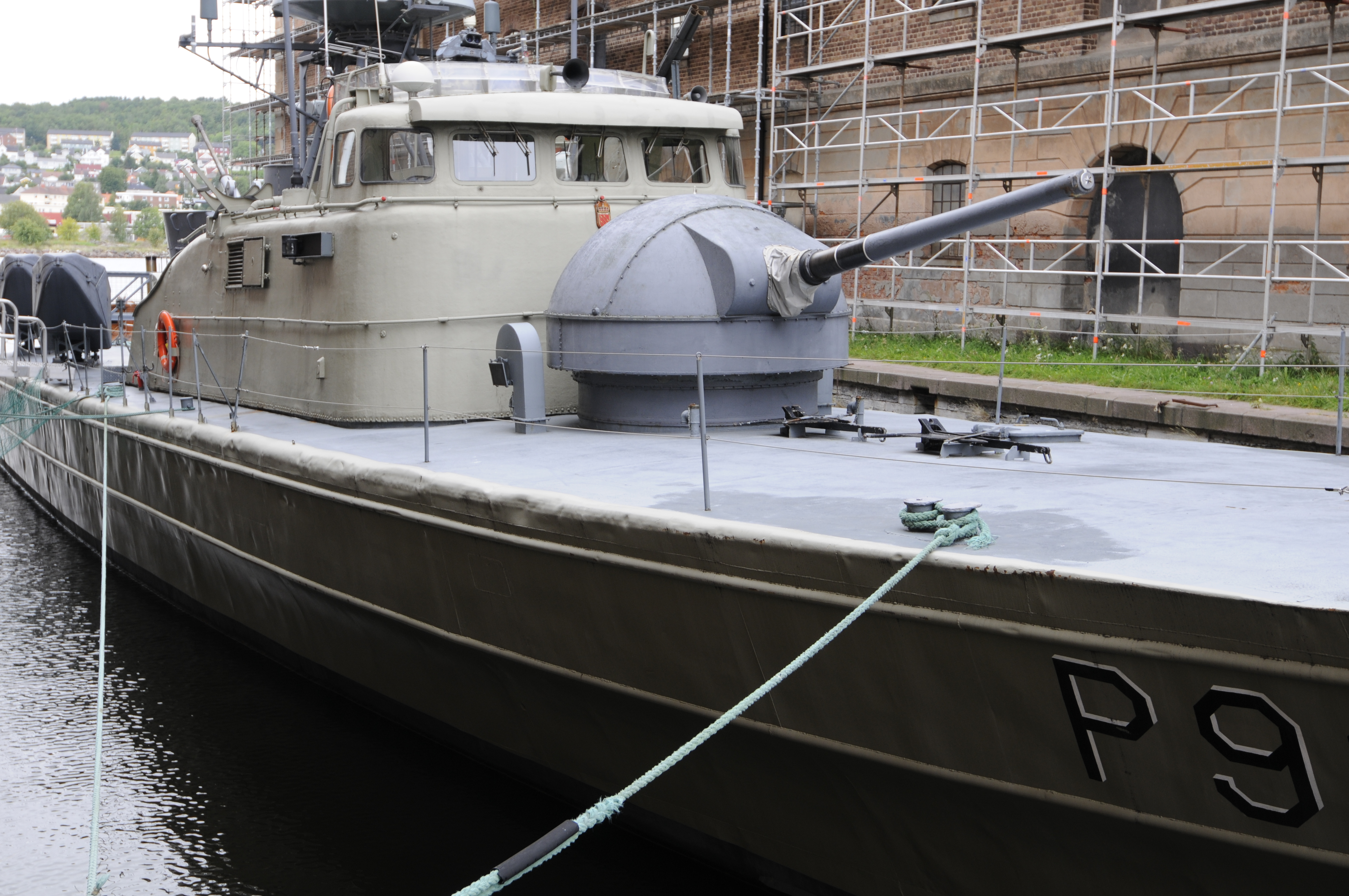

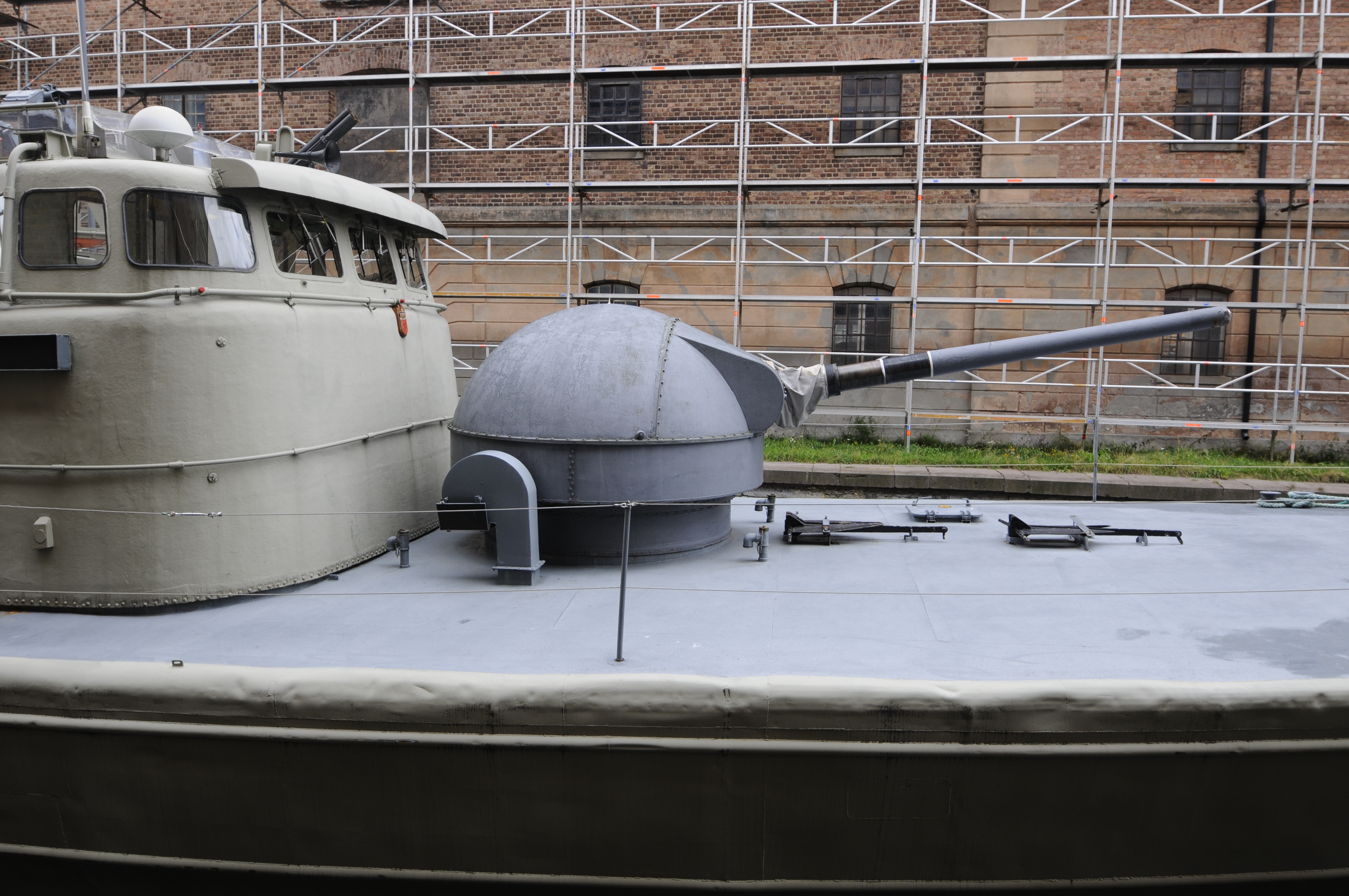

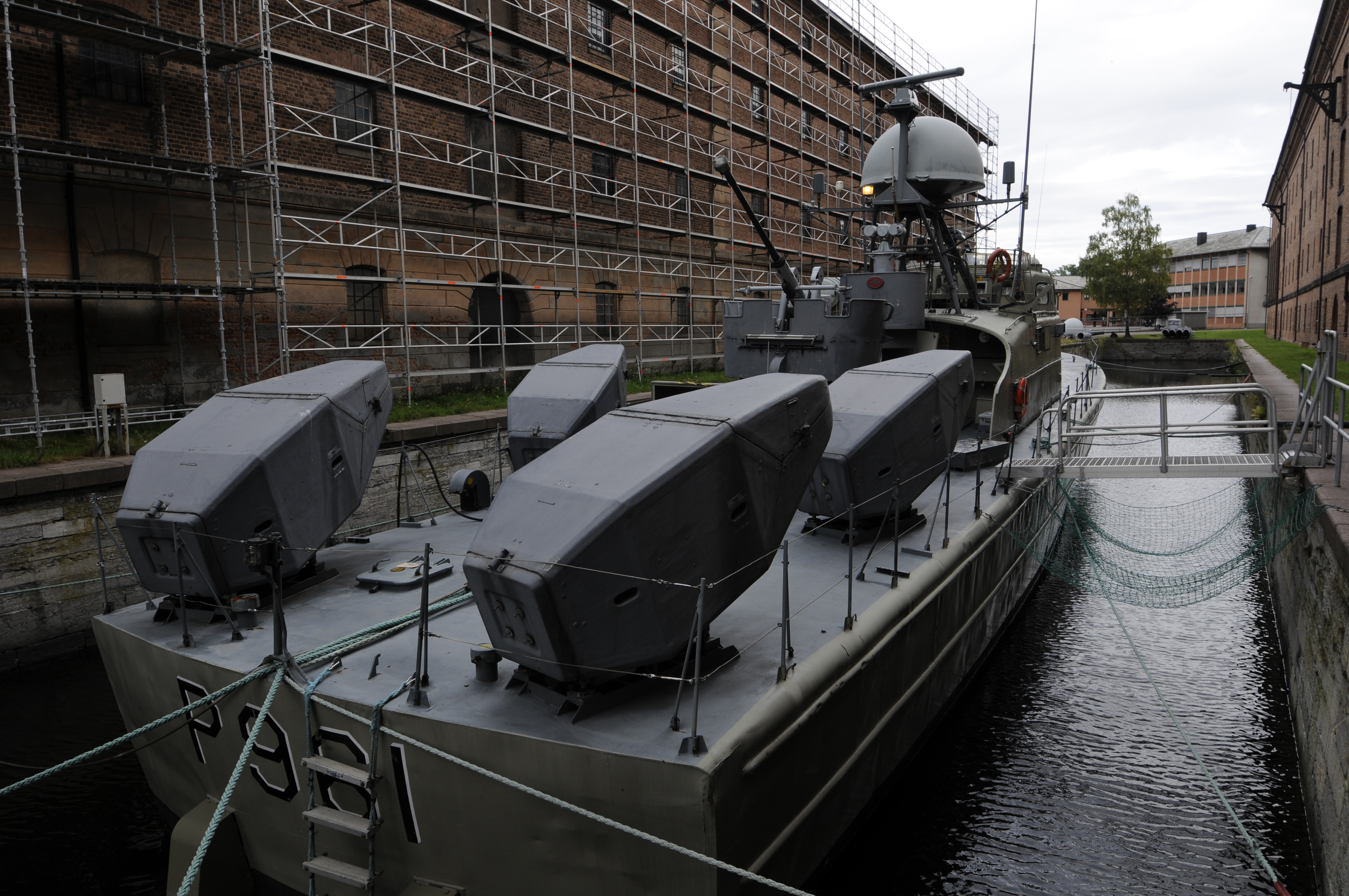

=== HNoMS Blink P961 - Inside and under deck ===
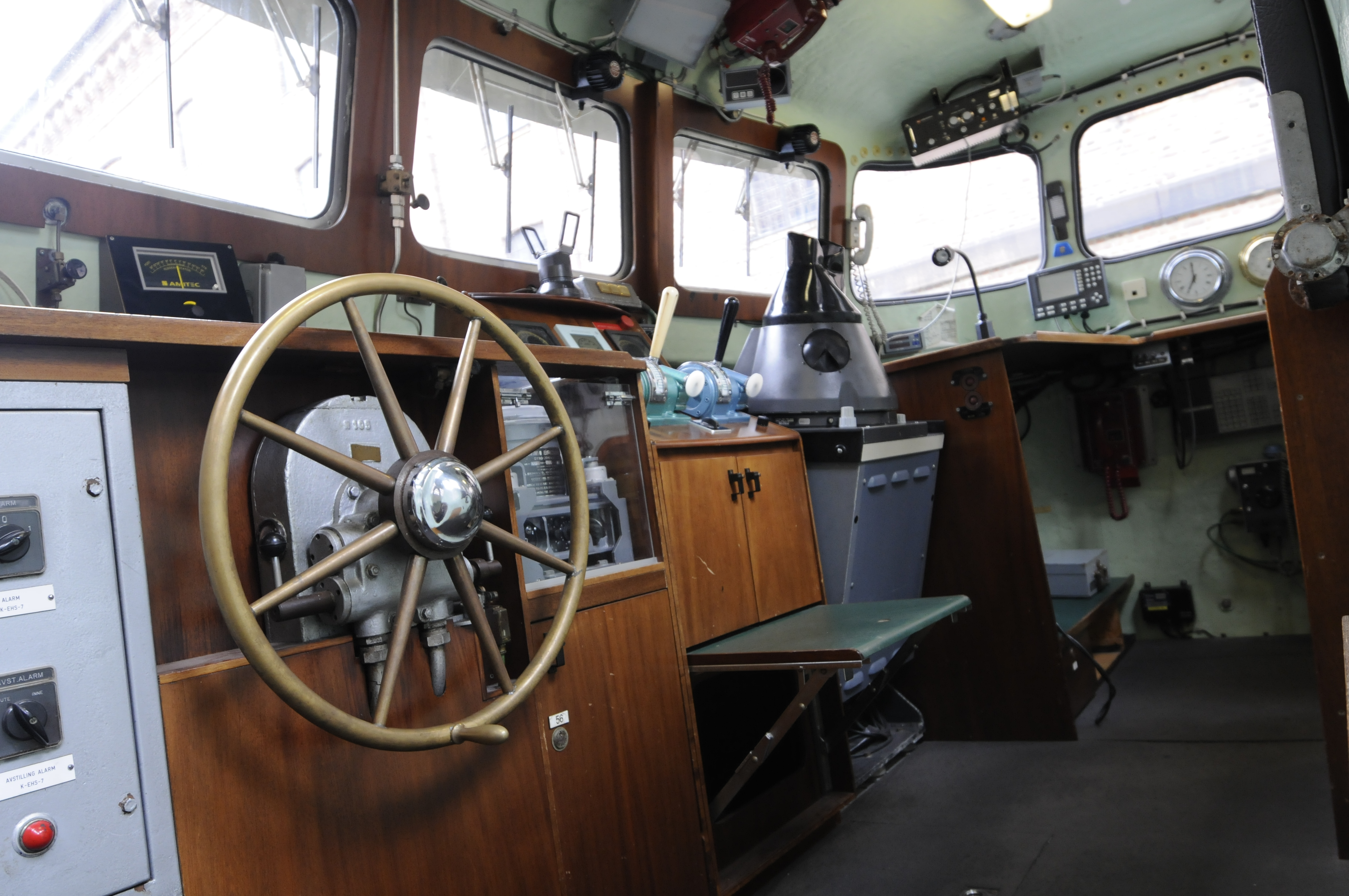

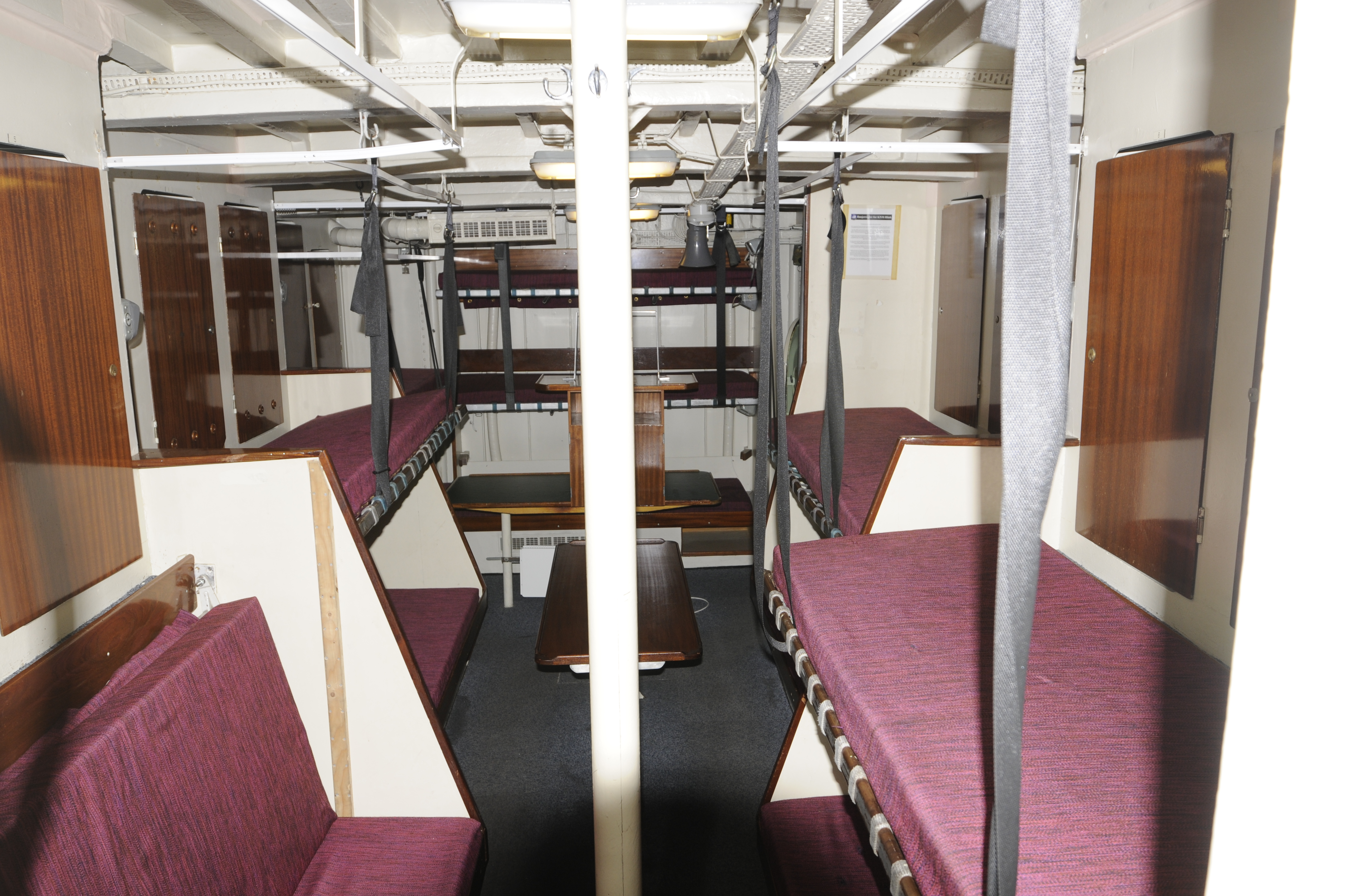

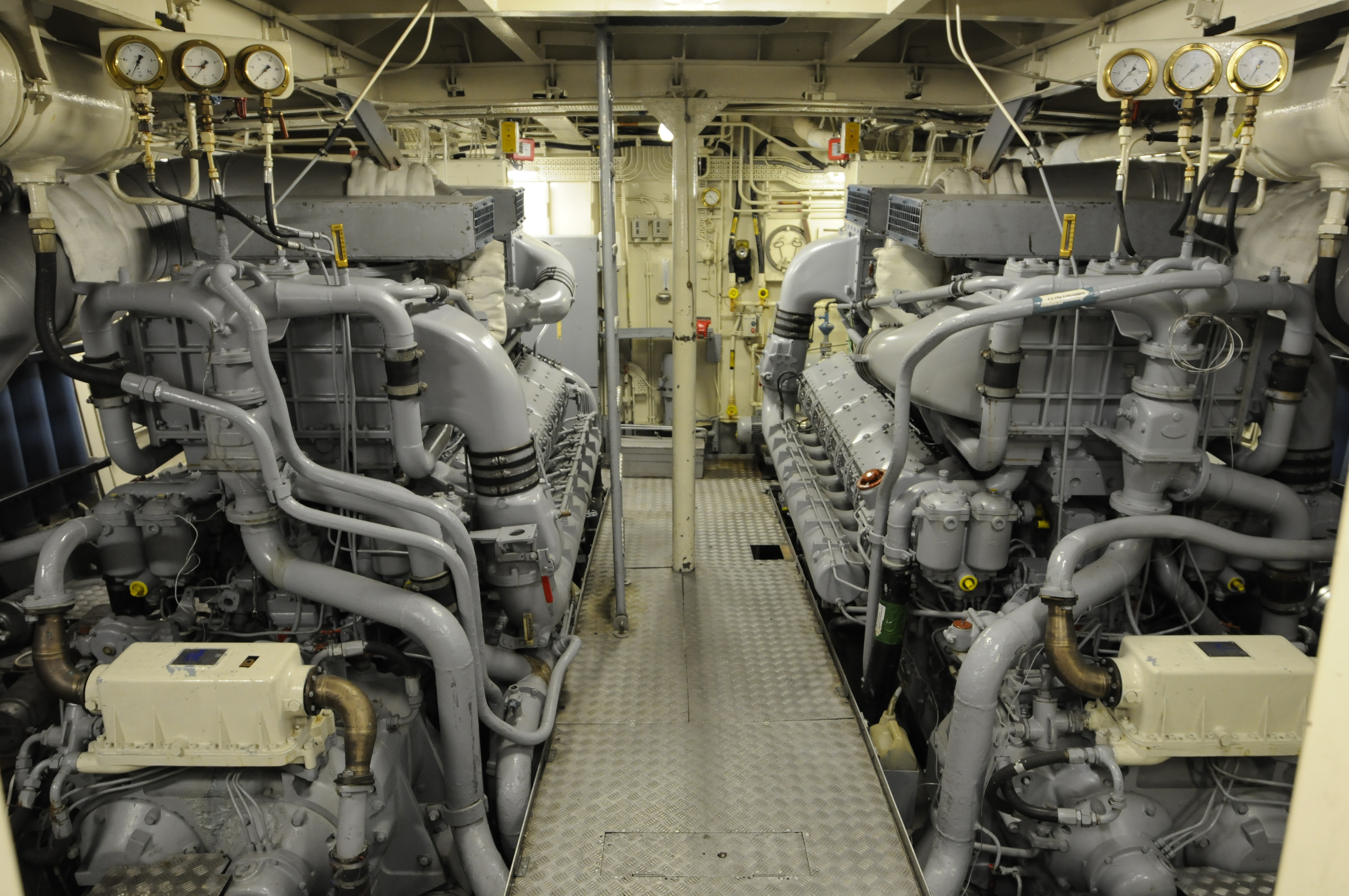

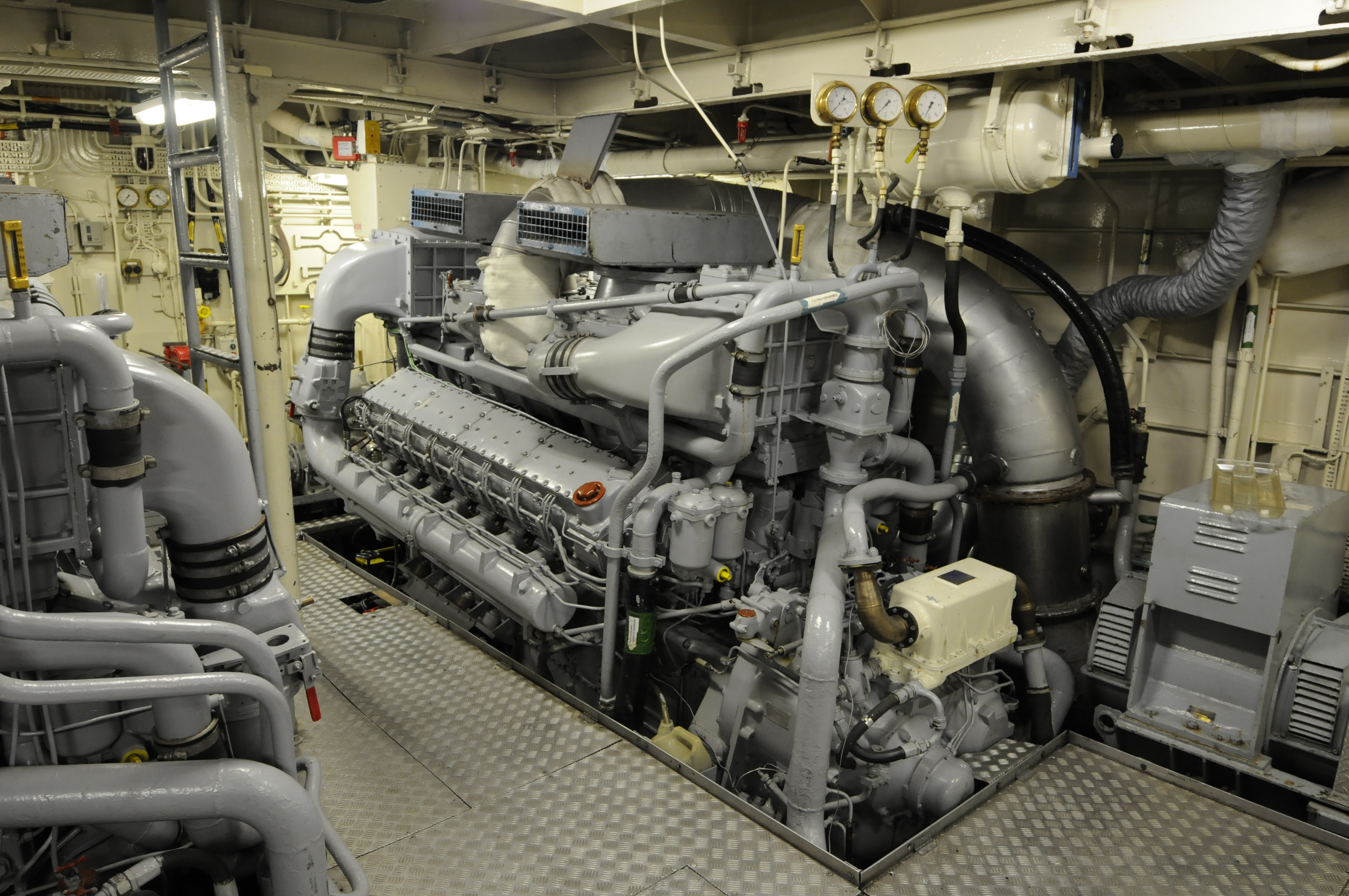

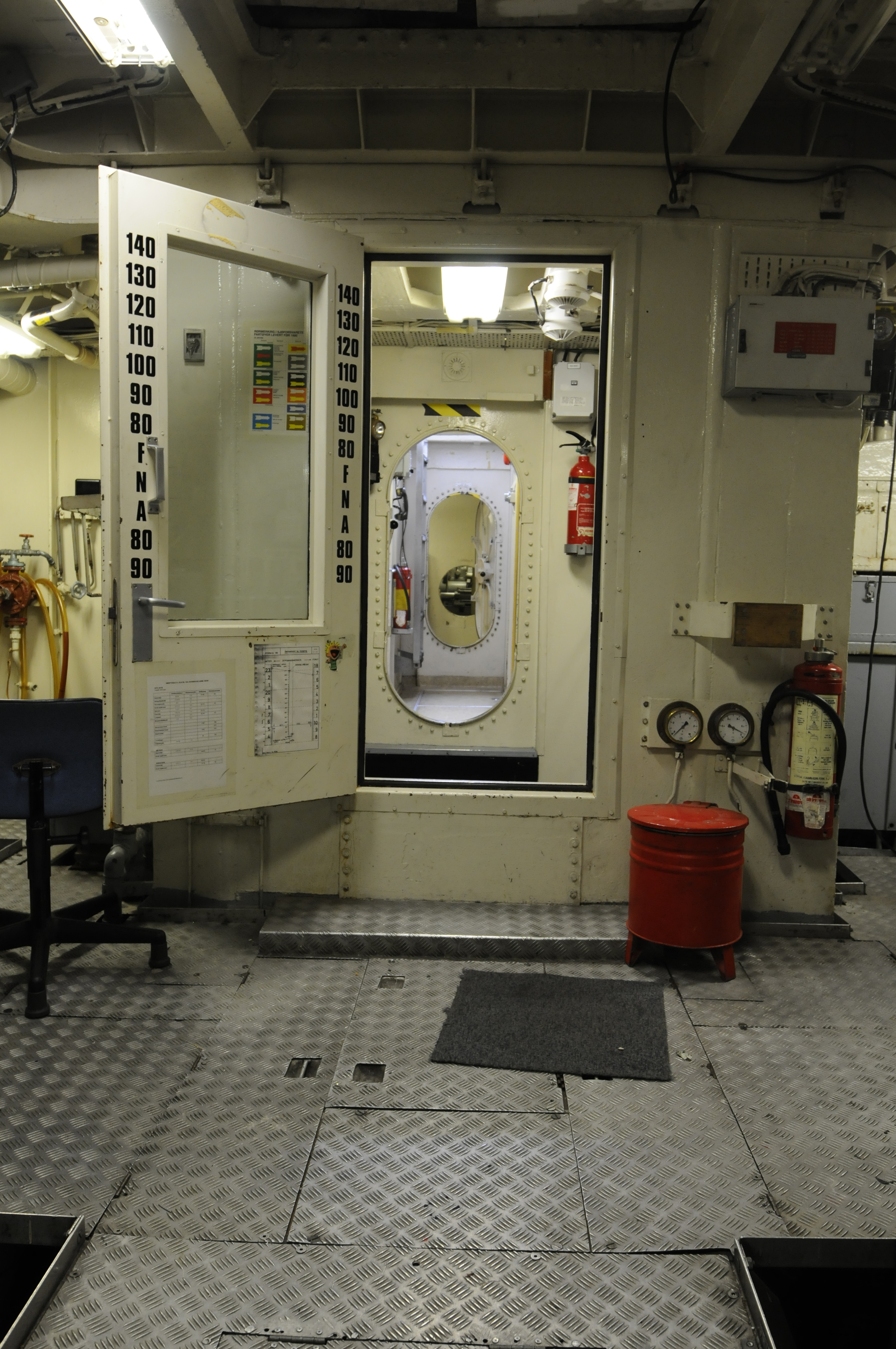
