= Snøgg-class missile torpedo boat =

Royal Norwegian Navy ship class

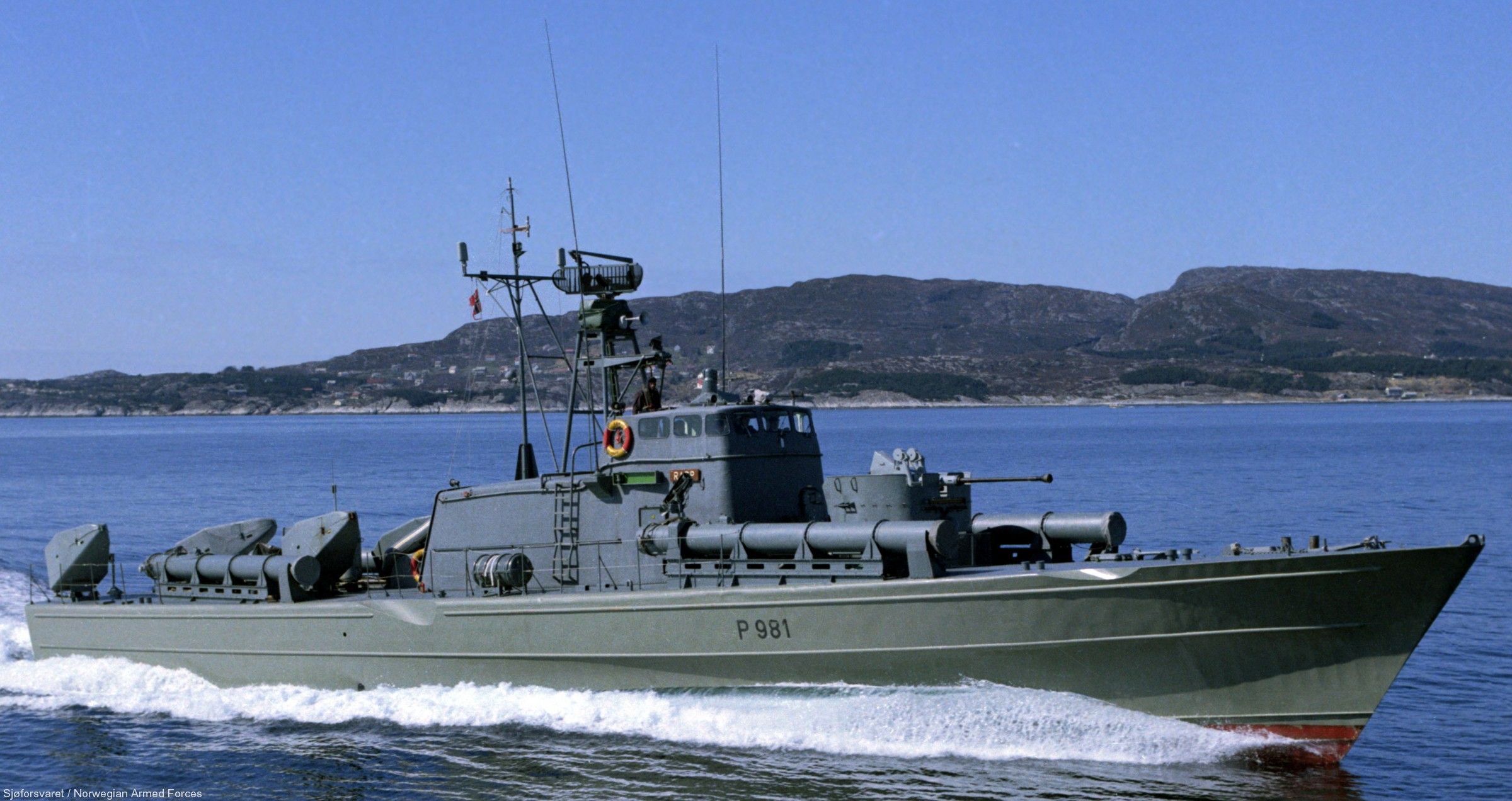
- HnoMs Rapp off the coast of Norway

Class overview
- Operators: Royal Norwegian Navy
- Built: 1970–1971
- In commission: 1970–1995
- Completed: 6

General characteristics
- Type: Patrol boat
- Displacement: 138 long tons (140 t)
- Length: 36.5 m (119 ft 9 in)
- Beam: 6 m (19 ft 8 in)
- Propulsion: 2 × Maybach diesel engines, 7,200 hp (5,369 kW) total
- Speed: 30 knots (35 mph; 56 km/h)
- Range: 880 km (550 mi)
- Complement: 19
- Armament: 4 × Penguin anti-ship missiles; 4 × Wire-guided torpedoes; 1 × 40 mm (1.6 in) AA gun

The Snøgg class was a Royal Norwegian Navy class of fast patrol boats (FPB). It might also be classified as a torpedo boat or a missile boat. In Norway this type of vessel is called a missile torpedo boat (MTB). The class was named after its lead vessel, Snøgg, which is a Norwegian word meaning "fast". All of the subsequent names are synonyms of "fast".

Six vessels were built during 1970 and 1971 to replace the ageing Rapp class. Designed by Lieutenant-commander (later Captain) Harald Henriksen as a development of the Storm class. None of the vessels are left in Norwegian service today, they have been succeeded by the Hauk and Skjold classes.

== Vessels ==
Listed here in order of delivery with their pennant numbers in RNoN service:

- HNoMS Snøgg (P980) (1970-1994)
- HNoMS Rapp (P981)
- HNoMS Snar (P982)
- HNoMS Rask (P983)
- HNoMS Kvikk (P984) (1970-1995)
- HNoMS Kjapp (P985)

Note: The Norwegian prefix for RNoN vessels is KNM.

== Sources ==
- Information folder from Forsvarets rekrutterings- og mediesenter (Norwegian defence recruitment and media centre) 1991/92 (in Norwegian)
- Royal Norwegian Navy history web page (in Norwegian)
