= List of capital ships of minor navies =

This is a list of capital ships (battleships, ironclads and coastal defence ships) of minor navies:

== Argentina ==
- El Plata class
  - ARA El Plata (1874)
  - ARA Los Andes (1874)
- Almirante Brown class
  - ARA Almirante Brown (1880)
- Independencia class
  - ARA Independencia (1891)
  - ARA Libertad (1892) - named Nueve de Julio when ordered
- Rivadavia class
  - ARA Rivadavia (1911) - Broken up 1950s
  - ARA Moreno (1911) - Broken up 1950s

== Australia (Victoria colony until 1901) ==
- HMVS Nelson (1814, ex-HMS Nelson, transferred 1867 to Victoria) - Cut down to frigate, broken up 1928
- HMVS Cerberus (1868) - Scuttled as breakwater 1926
- HMAS Australia (1913) - Scuttled in 1924

== Brazil ==
=== Ships of the line ===
- Vasco da Gama 74–80 (1792, ex-Portuguese, captured 1822)
- Medusa 68–74 (1786, ex-Portuguese, captured 1822, ex-Nossa Senhora do Monte do Carmo, renamed 1793)
- Afonso de Albuquerque 62–64 (1767, ex-Portuguese, captured 1822, ex-Nossa Senhora dos Prazeres, renamed 1796/97) - Discarded, 1826
- Principe Real 90 (1771, ex-Portuguese, captured 1822, ex-Nossa Senhora da Conceicão, renamed 1794)
- Conde Dom Henrique 74 (1763, ex-Portuguese, captured 1822, ex-Nossa Senhora do Pilar, renamed 1793)
- Dom Pedro I 64–74 (1763, ex-Portuguese Martim de Freitas, acquired 1822, ex-Infante Dom Pedro Carlos, renamed 1806, ex-Santo António e São José, renamed 1794, renamed Dom Pedro I)
- Dom João de Castro 64–72 (1766, ex-Portuguese, acquired 1822, ex-Nossa Senhora do Bom Sucesso, renamed 1800)

=== Coastal defence ships ===
- Barroso (1864) – Broken up 1885
- Brasil (1864) – Broken up 1905
- Tamandaré (1865) – Broken up 1885
- Lima Barros (1865) – Intended as Paraguayan Bellona, renamed 1865, broken up 1905
- Rio de Janeiro (1866) – Mined 1866
- Bahia (1865) – Intended as Paraguayan Minerva, renamed 1865, broken up 1895
- Silvado (1866) – Intended as Paraguayan Nemesis, renamed 1865, discarded c. 1885, broken up 1895
- Mariz e Barros class
  - Mariz e Barros (1866) – Discarded 1890, broken up 1892
  - Herval (1866) – Discarded 1885, broken up 1887
- Cabral class
  - Cabral (1866) – Discarded 1885, broken up 1887
  - Colombo (1866) – Discarded 1885, broken up 1887
- Sete de Setembro (1874) – Discarded, broken up 1895
- Javary class
  - Javary (1873) – Sank 1893
  - Solimões (1874) – Broken up during the 1890s
- Independencia – Confiscated by Britain before delivery, renamed HMS Neptune
- Riachuelo (1883) – Sunk 1910
- Aquidabã (1885) – Renamed Vinte Quatro de Mayo 1894, renamed Aquidabã 1900, sunk 1906
- Marechal Deodoro class
  - Marechal Deodoro (1898) – To Mexico 1924, renamed Anahuac
  - Marechal Floriano (1899) – Discarded, broken up 1936

=== Dreadnoughts ===
- Minas Geraes class
  - Minas Geraes (1910) – Broken up 1954
  - São Paulo (1910) – Sank in storm while being towed to breakers 1951
- Rio de Janeiro – laid down in 1911 with seven main turrets; cancelled in 1912; sold to the Ottoman Navy as Sultân Osmân-ı Evvel in 1914 but seized by the Royal Navy in 1914 and named HMS Agincourt (scrapped 1924)
- Riachuelo – planned super-dreadnought, ordered but canceled after the beginning of the First World War

== Chile ==
- Almirante Cochrane class
  - Almirante Cochrane (1874) - Broken up c. 1935
  - Valparaiso (1875), renamed as Blanco Encalada in 1877 - Torpedoed 1891
- Huáscar (1865, ex-Peruvian Huáscar, captured 1879) - preserved at Talcahuano
- Capitan Prat (1890)
- Constitución class (not handed over)
  - Constitución (1903) - Confiscated by Britain 1903, renamed HMS Swiftsure, sold for breaking up 1920
  - Libertad (1903) - Confiscated by Britain 1903, renamed HMS Triumph, torpedoed 1915
- Almirante Latorre class
  - Almirante Latorre (1913) - purchased by Britain 1914 and renamed HMS Canada, repurchased 1920, broken up 1959
  - Almirante Cochrane (1913) - purchased by Britain 1918, renamed HMS Eagle and converted to aircraft carrier, sunk 1942

== China ==
- Dingyuan class
  - Dingyuan (1881) - Sunk 1895
  - Zhenyuan (1882) - Captured by Japan 1895, broken up 1910
- Pingyuan (1890) - Captured by Japan 1894, sunk 1904

== Colombia ==
- ? (1785, ex-Swedish Tapperheten 60, transferred 1825) - To Portugal by 1848

== India (British colony) ==
- Magdala (1870)

== Finland ==
- Väinämöinen-class
  - Väinämöinen (1932) - Transferred to Soviet Union 1947
  - Ilmarinen (1934) - Sunk by mines 1941

== Mexico ==
Ship of the line

- Congreso Mexicano (1789, ex-Spanish Asia, mutinied and handed over 1825) - Broken up 1830

Coastal defence ship

- Anahuac (1898, ex-Brazilian Marshal Deodoro, obtained 1924)

== Norway ==
Coastal defence ships serving, or ordered for, the Royal Norwegian Navy:

- Tordenskjold class
  - Tordenskjold (1897) - Captured by Germany 1940 and renamed Nymphe, reverted 1945, BU 1948
  - Harald Haarfagre (1897) - Captured by Germany 1940 and renamed Thetis, reverted 1945, BU 1948
- Eidsvold class
  - Norge (1900) - Torpedoed 1940
  - Eidsvold (1900) - Torpedoed 1940
- Bjørgvin class
  - Bjørgvin (1912) - Confiscated by the British Navy and renamed HMS Glatton, blew up
  - Nidaros (1912) - Confiscated by the British Navy and renamed HMS Gorgon

== Peru ==
- Independencia (1865) - Wrecked 1879
- Huáscar (1865) - Captured by Chile 1879, preserved at Talcahuano

== Thailand ==
- Thonburi-class
  - Thonburi (1938) - Struck 1959
  - Sri Ayudhya (1938) - Sunk 1951 during the Manhattan Rebellion

== Ukraine ==
All Ukrainian battleships were previously part of the Russian Black Sea Fleet and were subsequently taken over by the Soviet Union

- Evstafi-class
  - Evstafi
  - Ioann Zlatoust
- Rostislav
- Soborna Ukraina

== Yugoslavia ==
- Tegetthoff-class
  - Jugoslavija (1918) - Transferred on 31 October 1918 from the Austro-Hungarian Navy, sunk by Italian frogmen on the following day
- Kumbor (1919) - War reparation from Austria-Hungary, scrapped 1922

== Bibliography ==
- Campbell, N. J. M. (1979). "Norway". In Chesneau, Roger & Kolesnik, Eugene M. (eds.). Conway's All the World's Fighting Ships 1860–1905. New York: Mayflower Books. pp. 369–371. ISBN 0-8317-0302-4.
- Gard, Bertil; Becker, William A. B (1966). "Scandinavian Coast Defense Ships: Part I – Sweden". Warship International. 3 (2): 130–139. JSTOR 44885673.
- Scheina, Robert L. (1985). "Brazil". In Gray, Randal (ed.). Conway's All the World's Fighting Ships 1906–1921. Annapolis, Maryland: Naval Institute Press. pp. 403–407. ISBN 0-85177-245-5.
