= Gorgon-class monitor =

British monitor class

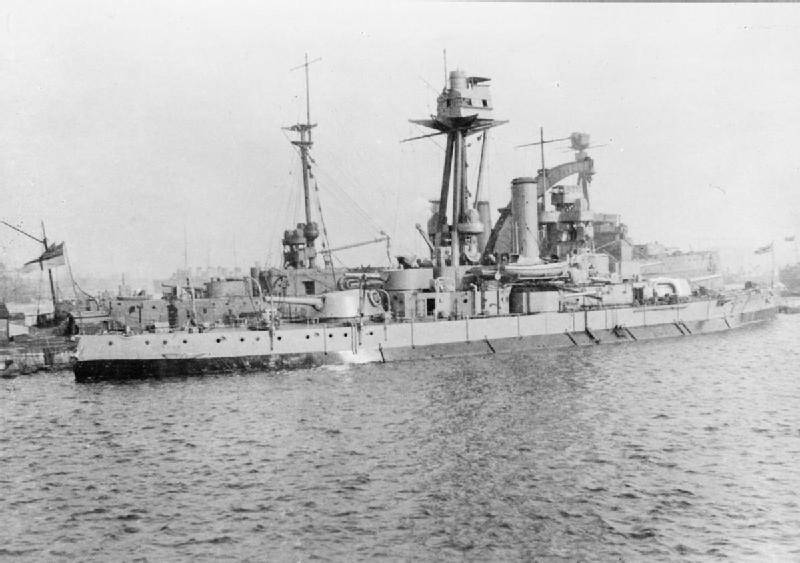
- HMS Gorgon

Class overview
- Name: Gorgon class
- Builders: Armstrong Whitworth, Elswick
- Operators: Royal Navy
- Preceded by: Marshal Ney class
- Succeeded by: M15 class
- Cost: About £640,000
- Built: 1913–1918
- In service: 1918–1919
- In commission: 1918–1919
- Completed: 2
- Lost: 1
- Scrapped: 1

General characteristics
- Type: Monitor
- Displacement: 5,746 long tons (5,838 t) at deep load
- Length: 310 ft (94 m)
- Beam: 73 ft 7 in (22.43 m) at bulge; 55 ft (17 m) at main hull
- Draught: 16 ft 4 in (4.98 m)
- Installed power: 4 Yarrow boilers; 4,000 ihp (3,000 kW)
- Propulsion: 2 shafts; Vertical triple-expansion steam engines
- Speed: 12 knots (22 km/h; 14 mph)
- Endurance: 2,700 nmi (5,000 km; 3,110 mi) at 11 knots (20 km/h; 13 mph)
- Complement: 305
- Armament: 2 × 1 – 9.2-inch (234 mm) Mk XII guns; 4 × 1 – BL 6 inch Mk XVIII guns; 2 × 1 – QF 3 inch 20 cwt gun anti-aircraft guns; 4 × 3-pounder; 4 × 2-pounder AA guns
- Armour: Belt: 3–7 in (76–178 mm); Bulkheads: 3–5 in (76–127 mm); Turret faces and barbettes: 8 in (203 mm); Turret sides 6 in (152 mm); Conning tower: 8 in (203 mm); Decks: 1–3.5 in (25–89 mm)

The Gorgon-class monitors were a class of monitors in service with the Royal Navy during World War I. Gorgon and her sister ship Glatton were originally built as coastal defence ships for the Royal Norwegian Navy, as HNoMS Nidaros and HNoMS Bjørgvin respectively but requisitioned for British use. Gorgon commissioned first, in June 1918 and bombarded German positions and other targets in Occupied Flanders. She fired the last shots of the war by the Royal Navy into Belgium on 15 October 1918. She was offered for sale after the war, but was used as a target ship when there were no takers. She was sold for scrap in 1928. Glatton was destroyed by a magazine explosion only days after she was completed in September 1918 while in Dover Harbour. She remained a hazard to shipping until the wreck was partially salvaged and the remains moved out of the way during 1925–26.

== Background ==
The Norwegians ordered two coast defence vessels in January 1913 from the British shipbuilder Armstrong Whitworth for delivery in twenty-four months to supplement the older Eidsvold and Tordenskjold classes of coastal defence ships. Their dimensions were limited to a length overall of 290 feet (88 m) and a beam of 55 feet (17 m) to fit in the drydock at Horten. Armstrong's design was for a ship with a designed displacement of 4,807 long tons (4,884 t) with an armament of two 50-calibre 240-millimetre (9 in) Armstrong guns mounted in single turrets fore and aft. Four 50-calibre 150-millimetre (6 in) guns were also mounted in single turrets; two of which were superfiring over the main turrets and the others were on each side of the superstructure. Anti-torpedo boat defense would be provided by six 100-millimetre (4 in) guns mounted in the superstructure. Two submerged 450-millimetre (18 in) torpedo tubes were also to be mounted. The armour belt protected most of the waterline and was 7 inches (180 mm) thick, but tapered towards the ends. The protective deck was 1–3.5 inches (25–89 mm) thick and ran the full length of the ship.

== Purchase and adaptation ==
At the outbreak of World War I in August 1914, both ships were under construction at Armstrong Whitworth, Elswick, Nidaros had already been launched and Bjørgvin was launched only days after the start of the war. However, when World War I broke out, the Royal Navy requisitioned most warships under construction in Britain for foreign powers and refunded the two thirds of the £370,000 purchase price for each ship already paid by the Norwegians. The two ships were renamed as Glatton and Gorgon, after earlier breastwork monitors of 1871. Their completion was greatly delayed by the changes made by the British, which included modifying the boilers to use both oil and coal and conversion of twelve double-bottom tanks to carry the oil. This work began on 9 January 1915, but was suspended the following May, although it was estimated that only another ten to twelve months of work remained, to allow for faster progress to be made on the large light cruisers Furious and Courageous that were building in Armstrong's Naval Yard downriver.

== General characteristics ==
In September 1917 work was resumed to a new design that added a large anti-torpedo bulge along about 75% of the hull's length. The Gorgons displaced 5,700 long tons (5,800 t) at deep load as built, almost 1,000 long tons (1,000 t) more than originally designed. They had a length of 310 feet (94.5 m), a beam of 73 feet 7 inches (22.4 m) at maximum, although her main hull only had a beam of 55 feet (17 m) and a draught of 16 feet 4 inches (5.0 m).

=== Propulsion ===
They were powered by two vertical triple expansion steam engines, which developed 4,000 indicated horsepower (3,000 kW) from four Yarrow watertube boilers that gave a maximum speed of 12 knots (22 km/h; 14 mph). Addition of the bulges cost 2 knots (3.7 km/h; 2.3 mph) in speed, but prevented the extra weight resulting from all of these changes from deepening her draft. They carried 364 long tons (370 t) of coal and 171 long tons (174 t) of fuel oil which gave them a range of 2,700 nautical miles (5,000 km; 3,100 mi) at 11 knots (20 km/h; 13 mph).

=== Armament ===
No changes were made to the layout of the main and secondary armament as designed for the Norwegians. But the guns specified by the Norwegians could not use standard British ammunition and had to be relined to do so. The 240-mm guns were known as the BL 9.2-inch (230 mm) Mk XII gun after modification. The turrets were modified to give a maximum elevation of 40° and be depressed to −5°. They fired a 391-pound (177 kg), 8 crh shell at a muzzle velocity of 3,060 ft/s (930 m/s) to a distance of 39,000 yards (36,000 m) using a supercharge. These guns were the longest-ranged guns, other than the BL 18 inch Mk I naval guns mounted in the Lord Clive-class monitors General Wolfe and Lord Clive that could range 40,500 yards (37,000 m), used by the Royal Navy during the war. They had a rate of fire of two rounds per minute. The ships carried 130 shells per gun.

Other than the modifications to the guns to use British ammunition no changes were made to the 6-inch (150 mm) secondary armament. The guns had a maximum depression of 5° and a maximum elevation of 20°. They fired 100-pound (45 kg) projectiles at a muzzle velocity of 2,874 ft/s (876 m/s) which gave a maximum range of 16,020 yards (14,650 m). They could fire three rounds per minute. Each gun was provided with 100 high explosive shells and 100 Common-pointed, capped shells. The magazine for the two side guns was shared between them, with a shell room directly under each turret. The boiler room was directly in front of the magazine and the engine room behind it.

The 100 mm guns and the torpedo tubes planned by the Norwegians were both omitted, and a large tripod mast was fitted behind the single funnel to carry the directors for both the 6-inch and 9.2-inch guns. One QF 3 inch 20 cwt anti-aircraft gun was mounted on each centreline 6-inch turret. This had a maximum depression of 10° and a maximum elevation of 90°. It fired a 12.5-pound (5.7 kg) shell at a muzzle velocity of 2,500 ft/s (760 m/s) at a rate of fire of 12–14 rounds per minute. They had a maximum effective ceiling of 23,500 ft (7,200 m). They also carried four 3-pounder Hotchkiss guns with 300 rounds per gun and two or four 2-pounder guns with 1,000 rounds per gun on high-angle mounts.

=== Armour ===
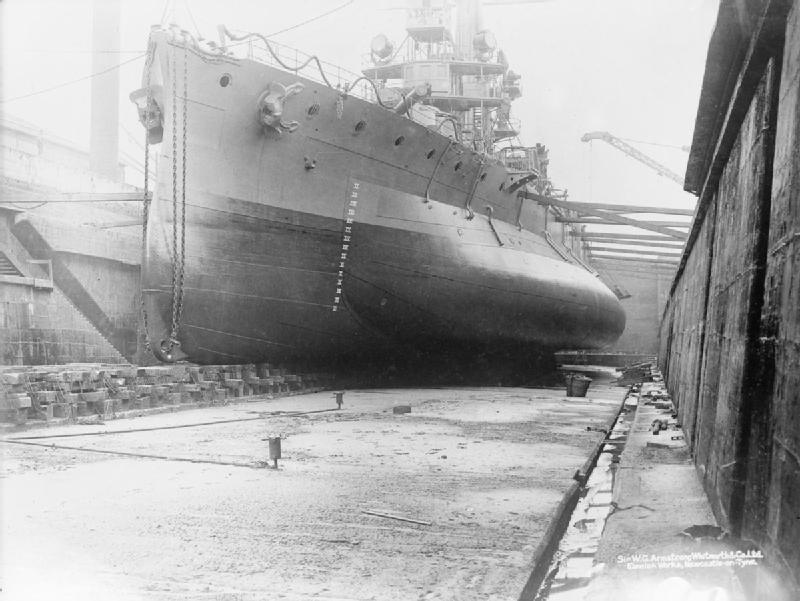
Glatton in drydock, note the depth of the torpedo bulge

The addition of the anti-torpedo bulges were the only changes made to the protection scheme of the Gorgons. The armour used throughout was Krupp cemented armour unless otherwise noted. The waterline armour belt was seven inches thick between the fore and aft turrets, but tapered to 4 inches (100 mm) towards the bow and 3 inches (76 mm) towards the stern. Above it was a strake of four-inch armour that covered the area between the turrets up to the upper deck that increased to six inches abreast the wing barbettes. The high-tensile steel deck was only one inch thick amidships on the flat, but increased to two inches as it curved down to meet the main armour belt. Forward of 'A' turret it increased to 2.5 inches (64 mm) as it sloped downwards to the bow. Aft of 'Y' turret it also increased to two inches, then three inches over the steering gear and 3.5 inches (89 mm) as it curved down towards the stern before meeting a 5 inches (130 mm) bulkhead at the rear of the ship. The main gun barbettes and turret faces were all 8 inches (200 mm) thick, but the turret sides were 6 inches in thickness with three inch Krupp non-cemented armour (KNC) roofs. The secondary gun turrets and barbettes were also six inches thick with two inch roofs. The conning tower was eight inches thick with a three-inch KNC roof.

== Construction ==
Both ships were built by Armstrong Whitworth at Elswick. Glatton was laid down first, on 26 May 1913, but was not launched until 8 August 1914. She commissioned after her sister on 31 August 1918, but was not formally completed, after finishing her trials, until 9 September. Gorgon was laid down on 11 June 1913, but was launched before her sister, on 9 June 1914, and commissioned first as well, on 1 May 1918, although she did not complete her trials until 4 June.

The total costs, including all alterations, were £513,242 for Glatton and £777,197 for Gorgon, although there was no obvious reason for the disparity unless some of Glatton's costs had been charged against Gorgon as the lead ship of the class. A truer cost would be about £645,000 for each. This was almost double the original cost and made them more expensive than any of the other monitors.

== History ==
=== Gorgon ===
Gorgon was the first to go into action as she bombarded German artillery positions in Belgium at the end of July 1918. She bombarded the Snaeskerk bridge on 28 and 29 September, but produced a single near-miss. She fired at German artillery batteries again on 14 October, but had to retreat hurriedly when she was straddled by heavy German return fire and she was hit by splinters from near-misses. The next day she bombarded another bridge; the last rounds fired by a Royal Navy warship at targets in Occupied Belgium.

She was sent to Portsmouth after the end of the war where she was made available to investigate the cause of her sister ship Glatton's magazine explosion. She was paid off on 31 August 1919 and joined the Reserve Fleet in September. She was offered back to the Norwegians, but they rejected her as unsuitable to their requirements, especially since she was now too broad for their dock at Horten. Several attempts were made to sell her, but she was disarmed in 1922 and used as a target ship to evaluate the effects of bombs bursting underwater near a ship and the effects of six-inch gunfire. She was finally sold for scrap on 26 August 1928 and broken up at the former naval dockyard at Pembroke.

=== Glatton ===
After completion Glatton sailed for Dover on 11 September 1918 to prepare for the offensive planned for later that month. On the evening of 16 September Glatton's midships 6-inch magazine had a low-order explosion that ignited the cordite stored there. Flames shot through the roof of 'Q' turret, starboard midside, and started to spread aft. The forward magazines were flooded, but the rear magazines were unable to be flooded as the flames blocked access to the controls. The presence of the ammunition ship Gransha only 150 yards (140 m) away risked a massive explosion that would devastate Dover if Glatton's rear magazine exploded and set off Gransha's ammunition. Vice-Admiral Keyes ordered the destroyer Cossack to torpedo Glatton in an attempt to flood the magazine before it detonated. Cossack's torpedoes were not powerful enough and Glatton remained afloat, still burning. Keyes then ordered the destroyer Myngs to fire on Glatton with her 21-inch (530 mm) torpedoes. They were aimed at the hole blown in Glatton's starboard side by Cossack's second torpedo and caused Glatton to capsize until her masts and superstructure rested on the harbor bottom, dousing the fire. Casualties were heavy, 60 men were killed outright and 124 were injured of whom 19 later died of their burns.

A Court of Enquiry held immediately afterwards found that the explosion had occurred in the midships 6-inch magazine situated between the boiler and engine rooms. The cause was less easy to establish, but the Court noted that the stokers were in the habit of piling the red-hot clinker and ashes from the boilers against the bulkhead directly adjoining the magazine. The magazine was well insulated with 5 inches (130 mm) of cork, covered by wood planking ¾-inch (1.9 cm) thick and provided with special cooling equipment so it was not likely that the cordite had spontaneously combusted. Gorgon's magazine was emptied and examined. The red lead paint on the bulkhead was blistered beneath the lagging and tests at the National Physical Laboratory demonstrated that it had been subject to temperatures of at least 400 °F (204 °C). Recorded temperatures inside the magazine did not exceed 83 °F (28 °C) and a test of red-hot ashes was inconclusive. Other tests did reveal that the cork could give off flammable fumes under high heat and pressurized air.

As a precaution, Gorgon's cork lagging was stripped out and replaced by silicate wool which revealed the real cause. Part of the cork was missing and folded newspapers were found in the empty space. Furthermore, a number of rivets were entirely missing which meant that ½-inch (12.7 mm) holes were present which could have dropped hot ashes onto the newspapers. The forced draught pressure in the boiler room would have supplied air through the rivet holes which would have caused the cork to give off flammable gases and eventually ignite the cordite charges.

Glatton remained in Dover Harbour, an obstruction to shipping, with her hull visible at low tide as the Harbour Board could not afford the £45,000 quoted on average by salvage companies. Work finally began in May 1925 as some 12,000 long tons (12,000 t) of silt were removed from underneath Glatton and her mainmast and superstructure were blasted away. All the holes on her topside had to be sealed and air pumped into each compartment at a rate of 70,000 cubic feet (1,982 m^{3}) per minute to restore her buoyancy. The first attempt to lift her began on 2 December 1925 and was successful in breaking the suction holding her to the bottom in combination with the rising tide. Slowly she was moved, taking advantage of the tides, until on 16 March 1926 she was moved to a deep gully next to the western pier of the submarine harbour, close by the shore. The total cost was considerably more than originally estimated, but still far less than that quoted by the salvage companies, at no more than £12,000. There she remains, buried by landfill underneath the current car ferry terminal. Her bell was salvaged and is on display at the Harbour Board offices.
