= HNoMS Nidaros =

HNoMS Nidaros is the name of the following ships of the Royal Norwegian Navy:

- HNoMS Nidaros (1841), a steam corvette scrapped in 1903
- HNoMS Nidaros (1914), a Bjørgvin-class coastal defence ship sold to the United Kingdom and commissioned as HMS Gordon

== See also ==
- Nidaros (disambiguation)
