= HNoMS Harald Haarfagre =

- Harald Haarfagre in drydock at Karljohansvern naval base.

History

Norway
- Name: Harald Haarfagre
- Namesake: Harald I of Norway
- Ordered: 1896
- Laid down: 1897
- Launched: 4 January 1897
- Commissioned: 21 March 1898
- Captured: by the Germans in 1940

Nazi Germany
- Name: Thetis
- Acquired: 1940
- Fate: Handed back to Norway after VE Day

Norway
- Name: Harald Haarfagre
- Acquired: 1945
- Fate: Scrapped 1948

General characteristics as built
- Class & type: Tordenskjold-class coastal defence ship
- Displacement: 3,858 long tons (3,920 t)
- Length: 92.66 m (304 ft 0 in)
- Beam: 14.78 m (48 ft 6 in)
- Draught: 5.38 m (17 ft 8 in)
- Propulsion: Coal-fired boilers, reciprocating steam engines, 4,500 hp (3,356 kW)
- Speed: 16.9 knots (31.3 km/h; 19.4 mph)
- Complement: 245
- Armament: 2 × 21 cm (8.3 in)/45 guns; 6 × 12 cm (4.7 in)/45 guns; 6 × 7.6 cm (3 in)/40 guns; 6 × 1-pounder Quick Fire guns; 2 × 45 cm (18 in) submerged torpedo tubes
- Armour: Belt : 7 in (178 mm); Turrets : 8 in (203 mm)

General characteristics after German rebuild
- Displacement: 3,858 long tons (3,920 t)
- Length: 92.66 m (304 ft 0 in)
- Beam: 14.78 m (48 ft 6 in)
- Draught: 5.38 m (17 ft 8 in)
- Propulsion: Coal-fired reciprocating steam engines, 4,500 hp (3,356 kW)
- Speed: 16.9 knots (31.3 km/h; 19.4 mph)
- Complement: 245
- Armament: 6 × 10.5 cm AA guns; 2 × 40 mm AA guns; 14 × 20 mm AA guns
- Armour: Belt : 7 in (178 mm); Turrets : 8 in (203 mm)

HNoMS Harald Haarfagre, known locally as Panserskipet Harald Haarfagre, was a Norwegian coastal defence ship. She, her sister ship Tordenskjold and the slightly newer Eidsvold class were built as part of the general rearmament in the time leading up to the events in 1905. Harald Haarfagre remained an important vessel in the Royal Norwegian Navy until she was considered unfit for war in the mid-1930s.

== Description ==
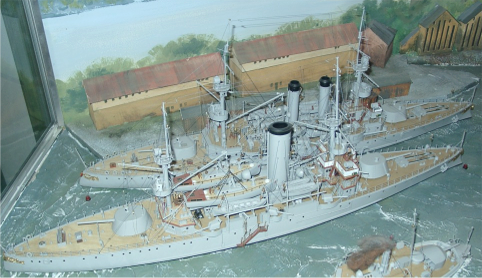
Models of the coastal defense ships Tordenskjold and Eidsvold. Tordenskjold in the front.

Built at Elswick and nearly identical to her sister ship Tordenskjold, Harald Haarfagre was named after Harald I of Norway, known as "Harald Fairhair" in English, the semi-mythical first king of a united Norway. Built as a typical pre-dreadnought battleship on a smaller scale, she carried guns of a wide range of calibers: two 8.2-inch guns in barbettes, six 4.7-inch, six 3-inch, and six smaller quick-firing guns. The ship could manage a speed of over seventeen knots. Protected by belt armor of seven inches thickness, the ship also featured gun barbettes with nearly eight inches of steel armor and an armored deck.

== Service history and fate ==
A vital part of the Royal Norwegian Navy, Harald Haarfagre performed ordinary duties until she was considered "unfit for war" in the mid-1930s and disarmed. After the German invasion of Norway, she was seized by the Germans and rebuilt as a floating flak battery under the name Thetis. After the war Harald Haarfagre was used briefly as a floating barracks, and for transporting German POWs, before she was sold for scrapping in 1948.

It was intended to augment the Norwegian Panserskip fleet with the two ships of the Bjørgvin class, ordered in 1912, but after these were compulsorily purchased by the Royal Navy at the outbreak of the First World War, the Tordenskjold class and the slightly newer, two ship, Eidsvold class remained in service the Norwegian navy long after they were obsolete due to a lack of suitable replacements.

Today the name KNM Harald Haarfagre is used on the Royal Norwegian Navy and Royal Norwegian Air Force Basic Training Establishment, located in Madla, Stavanger.

== Bibliography ==
- Dodson, Aidan & Nottlemann, Dirk (2023). "The German Flak Ships, Part I: The German and ex-Norwegian Hulls". In Jordan, John (ed.). Warship 2023. Oxford: Osprey Publishing. pp. 112–127. ISBN 978-1-4728-5713-2.
