= HNoMS Tordenskjold =

Norwegian naval vessel

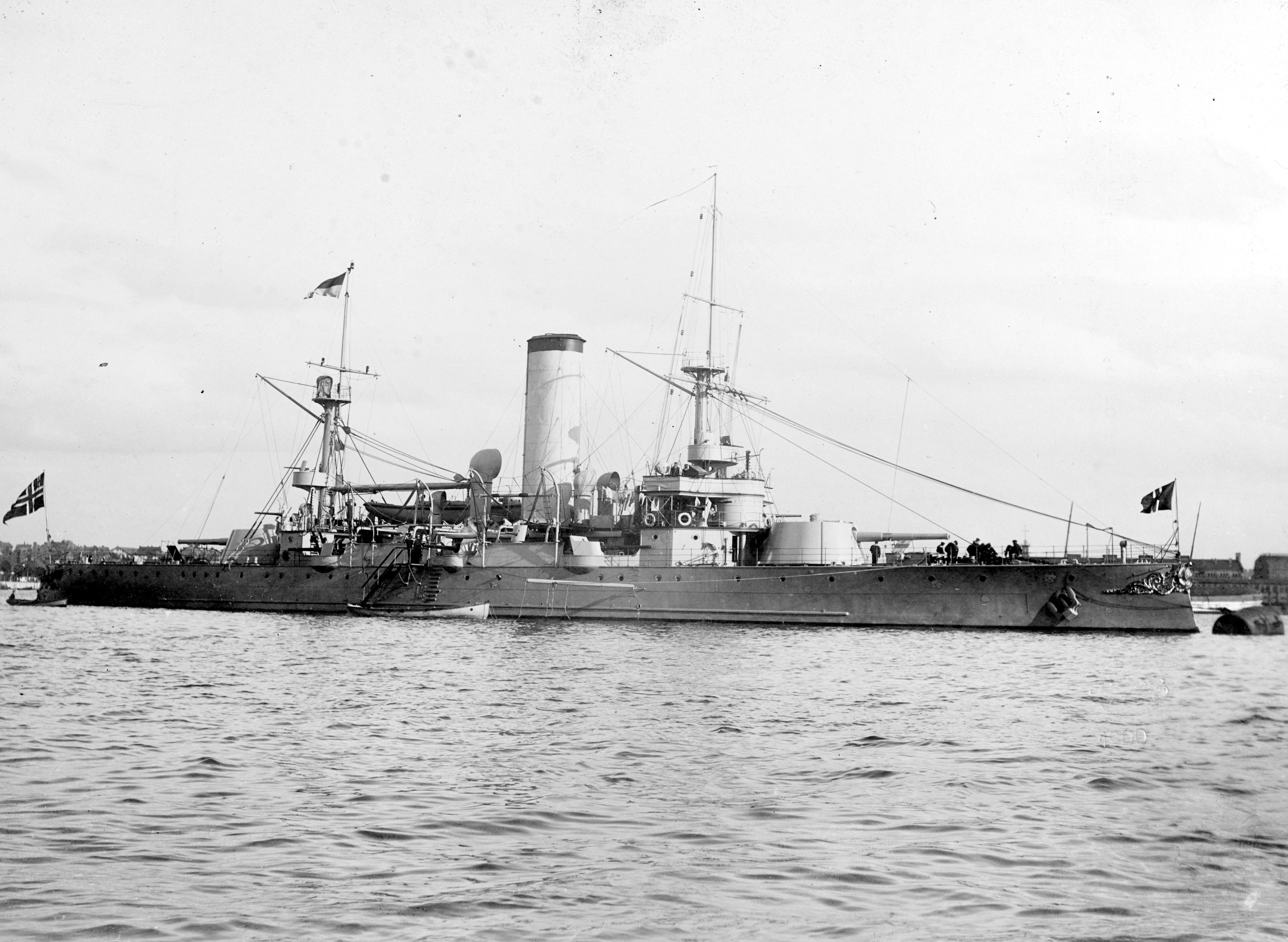
- Tordenskjold in 1900

History

Norway
- Name: Tordenskjold
- Namesake: Peter Tordenskjold
- Ordered: 1896
- Laid down: 1897
- Launched: 18 March 1897
- Commissioned: 21 March 1898
- Captured: by the Germans in 1940

Nazi Germany
- Name: Nymphe
- Acquired: 1940
- Fate: Handed back to Norway after VE Day

Norway
- Name: Tordenskjold
- Acquired: 1945
- Fate: Scrapped 1948

General characteristics as built
- Class & type: Tordenskjold-class coastal defence ship
- Displacement: 3,858 long tons (3,920 t)
- Length: 92.66 m (304 ft 0 in)
- Beam: 14.78 m (48 ft 6 in)
- Draught: 5.38 m (17 ft 8 in)
- Propulsion: Coal-fired reciprocating steam engines, 4,500 hp (3,356 kW)
- Speed: 16.9 knots (31.3 km/h; 19.4 mph)
- Complement: 245
- Armament: 2 × 21 cm (8 in)/45 guns; 6 × 12 cm (5 in)/45 guns; 6 × 7.6 cm (3 in)/40 guns; 6 × 1-pounder QF guns; 2 × 45 cm (18 in) submerged torpedo tubes
- Armour: Belt : 7 in (178 mm); Turrets : 8 in (203 mm)

General characteristics after German rebuild
- Displacement: 3,858 long tons (3,920 t)
- Length: 92.66 m (304 ft 0 in)
- Beam: 14.78 m (48 ft 6 in)
- Draught: 5.38 m (17 ft 8 in)
- Propulsion: Coal-fired reciprocating steam engines, 4,500 hp (3,356 kW)
- Speed: 16.9 knots (31.3 km/h; 19.4 mph)
- Complement: 245
- Armament: 6 × 10.5 cm AA guns; 2 × 40 mm AA guns; 14 × 20 mm AA guns
- Armour: Belt : 7 in (178 mm); Turrets : 8 in (203 mm)

HNoMS Tordenskjold, known locally as Panserskipet Tordenskjold, was a Norwegian coastal defence ship. She, her sister ship, Harald Haarfagre, and the slightly newer Eidsvold class were built as a part of the general rearmament in the time leading up to the events in 1905. Tordenskjold remained an important vessel in the Royal Norwegian Navy until she was considered unfit for war in the mid-1930s.

== Description ==
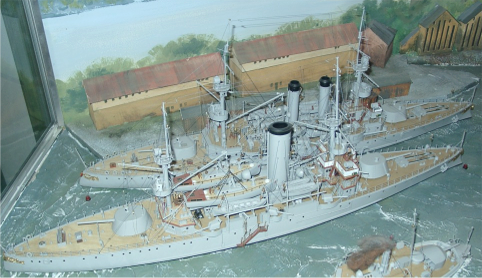
Models of the coastal defence ship Tordenskiold and Eidsvold. Tordenskjold in the front.

Built at Elswick and nearly identical to her sister ship Harald Haarfagre, Tordenskjold was named after Peter Wessel Tordenskjold, an eminent Norwegian naval hero in the service of the Kingdom of Denmark-Norway. Built as a typical pre-dreadnought battleship on a small scale, she carried guns of a wide range of calibers: two 8.2-inch (210 mm) guns in barbettes, six 4.7-inch (120 mm), six 3-inch (76 mm), and six smaller quick-firing guns. The ship could manage a speed of over 17 knots (31 km/h; 20 mph). Protected by belt armor of 7 inches (180 mm) thickness, the ship also featured gun barbettes with nearly 8 inches (200 mm) of steel armor and an armored deck.

== Service history and fate ==
A vital part of the Royal Norwegian Navy, Tordenskjold performed ordinary duties until 1918, when she was turned into a cadet ship. She performed well in this role, carrying out eighteen training cruises until considered "unfit for war" in the mid-1930s. After the German invasion of Norway, she was seized by the Germans and rebuilt as a floating flak battery with 10.5 cm AA guns and renamed Nymphe. In May, 1945 she was damaged by RAF aircraft at Svolvaer and beached. She was refloated later in the year. After the war Tordenskjold was used briefly as a floating barracks. On 17th of May 1945, while Norwegians celebrated their National Day, the ship had docked at Svolvaer to transport close to 500 germans in the area to a camp in Bogen outside Narvik. The ship hit a big rock below the surface outside the Island Lille-Molla, where the german captain Alfred Kemerer made the decision to run the ship aground. Rumors of alcohol and sabotage led to an big argument between Norwegian and German marine leaders.

The ship stayed on Lille-Molla until she was sold for scrapping in 1948.

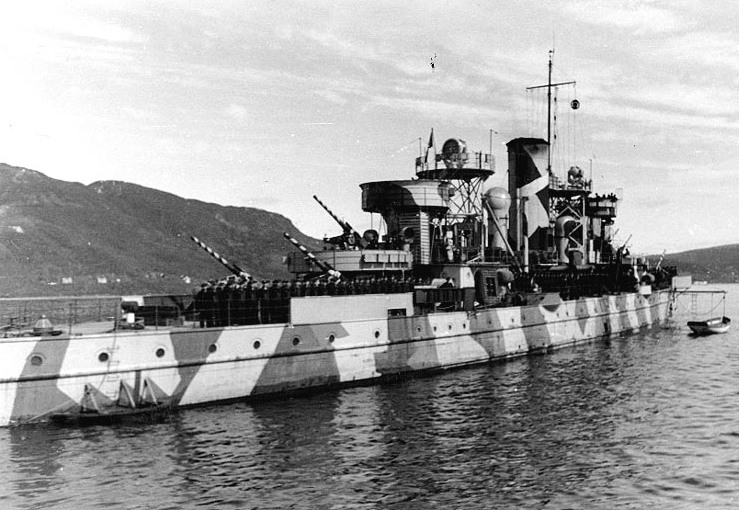
In German service as a flakship in 1940, renamed Nymphe.

It was intended to augment the Norwegian coastal defence ship fleet with the two ships of the Bjørgvin-class, ordered in 1912, but after these were confiscated by the Royal Navy at the outbreak of World War I the Tordenskjold class and the slightly newer, two ship Eidsvold class were forced to soldier on long after they were obsolete.

== Today ==
Today the name KNM Tordenskjold is used on the Norwegian Naval Training Establishment (NORNAVTRAINEST) at Haakonsvern, Bergen.

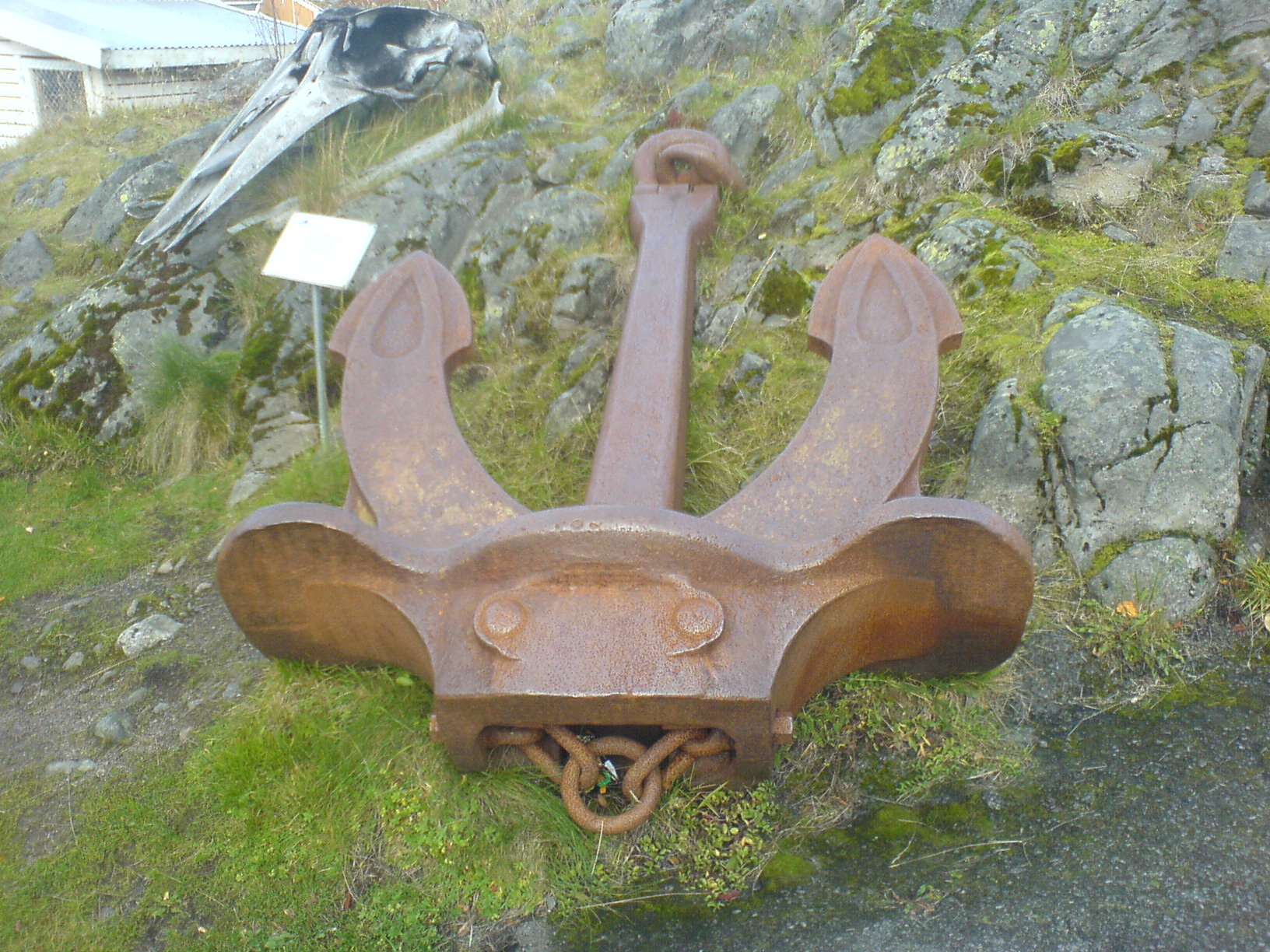
The anchor of Tordenskjold (2007)

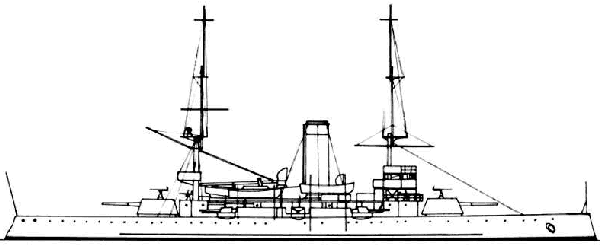
Plans of panserskipet Tordenskjold.

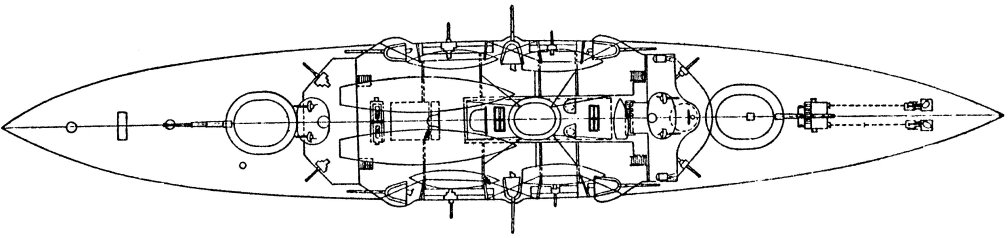
Note heavy guns in turrets fore and aft, and secondary armament in central battery.

== Bibliography ==
- Dodson, Aidan & Nottlemann, Dirk (2023). "The German Flak Ships, Part I: The German and ex-Norwegian Hulls". In Jordan, John (ed.). Warship 2023. Oxford: Osprey Publishing. pp. 112–127. ISBN 978-1-4728-5713-2.
