= HMS Gorgon =

Five ships of the Royal Navy have been named HMS Gorgon, after the Gorgon of Greek mythology:

- HMS Gorgon (1785) was a 44-gun fifth rate launched in 1785. She was converted into a storeship in 1793, a floating battery in 1805 and was broken up in 1817.
- HMS Gorgon (1837) was a steam frigate launched in 1837 and broken up in 1864.
- HMS Gorgon (1871) was a coast defence ship, launched on 18 July 1871 and broken up in 1903.
- HMS Gorgon (1914) was a coastal defence ship, originally the Norwegian Nidaros, in service during World War I and sold for scrap in 1928.
- HMS Gorgon (J346) was a Catherine-class minesweeper acquired in 1943 and returned to the US Navy in 1946.
