= HNoMS Norge =

Ship of the Eidsvold-class in the Royal Norwegian Navy

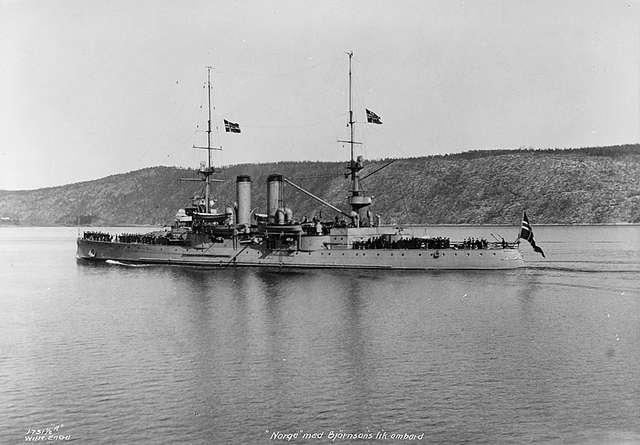
- Norge transporting the coffin of writer Bjørnstjerne Bjørnson in 1910

History

Norway
- Name: Norge
- Namesake: Norway
- Builder: Armstrong Whitworth at Newcastle on Tyne
- Launched: 31 March 1900
- Commissioned: 7 February 1901
- Fate: Sunk 9 April 1940 in Narvik Harbour, Norway

General characteristics
- Class & type: Eidsvold-class coastal defence ship
- Displacement: 4,233 tons (standard)
- Length: 94.60 m (310 ft 4 in)
- Beam: 15.70 m (51 ft 6 in)
- Draft: 5.40 m (17 ft 9 in)
- Propulsion: steam engines with; 4,500 hp (3,400 kW)
- Speed: 17.2 knots (31.9 km/h; 19.8 mph)
- Complement: 270 fully crewed, reduced to 229 in 1940, just 191 aboard when sunk
- Armament: 2 × 21 cm (8.26-inch) guns; 6 × 15 cm (5.90-inch) guns; 6 × 7.6 cm (3-inch) guns; Torpedo tubes; Anti-aircraft armament: 2 × 76 mm anti-aircraft guns; 2 × 20 mm Oerlikon guns; 2 × 12.7 mm Colt anti-aircraft machine guns; 4 × 7.92 mm Colt anti-aircraft machine guns

HNoMS Norge was a coastal defence ship of the Eidsvold class in the Royal Norwegian Navy. Built by Armstrong Whitworth at Newcastle on Tyne, she was torpedoed and sunk by German destroyers in Narvik harbour on 9 April 1940.

== Background and description ==
Built as part of the general rearmament in the time leading up to the events in 1905, Norge remained, along with her sister-ship Eidsvold, the backbone of the Royal Norwegian Navy for just over 40 years. Norge and Eidsvold were the largest vessels in the Royal Norwegian Navy, displacing 4,233 tons and crewed by 270 men. Both vessels were considered to be quite powerful for their time, with two 21 cm (8.26 inch) guns as their main armament. They were armoured to withstand battle with ships of a similar size, with 6 inches (15.24 cm) of Krupp cemented armour in the belt and 9 inches (22.86 cm) of the same armour on the two gun turrets.

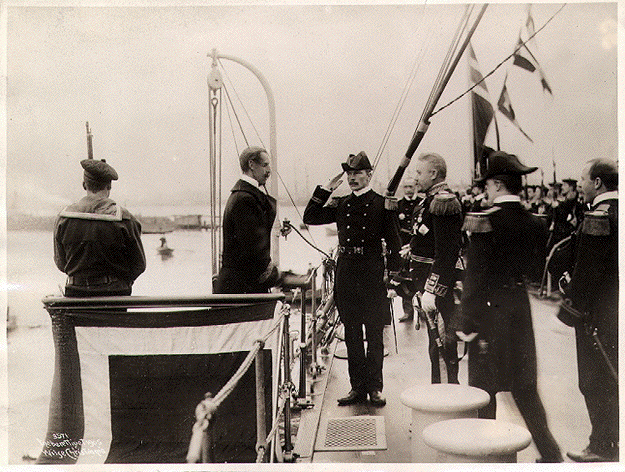
The recently elected King Haakon VII boards Norge on 28 November 1905

It was intended to augment the Norwegian coastal defence ship fleet with the two ships of the Bjørgvin class, ordered in 1912, but after these were requisitioned by the British Royal Navy while still under construction at the outbreak of World War I the Eidsvold class and the older, two ship strong, Tordenskjold class were kept in service long after they were obsolete.

Norge was launched from the Elswick shipyard of Armstron Whitworth on 31 March 1900, and commissioned in early 1901.

== First and final battle ==
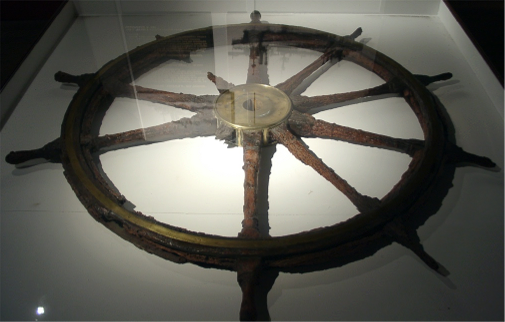
The emergency steering wheel from Norge, retrieved from Narvik harbour by divers in 1983

On the morning of 9 April 1940, a German force of ten destroyers, carrying troops of a mountain division, entered Ofotfjord under cover of fog and heavy snow. The Germans contacted the captain of Eidsvold, demanding that he surrender, and when this was turned down, the battle-ready German destroyers torpedoed Eidsvold before she could fire her guns.

Aboard Norge, deeper inside the fjord, the explosions were heard, but nothing could be seen until two German destroyers suddenly appeared out of the darkness. Captain Per Askim of Norge gave orders to open fire. Four rounds were fired from the 21 cm guns (one from the fore gun and three from the aft) as well as seven or eight rounds from the starboard 15 cm guns, directed against the German destroyer Bernd von Arnim. The range has been estimated as 800 metres (870 yd). Due to the difficult weather conditions, it was hard to use the optical sights for the guns, which resulted in the first salvo falling short of the target and the others going over the target.

The German destroyers waited until they were alongside the pier before returning fire. Bernd von Arnim opened fire with her 12.7 cm (5-inch) guns, as well as with machine guns, but the weather gave the Germans problems as well. The destroyer also fired torpedoes—in all three salvoes of two torpedoes each. The first two salvoes missed, but the last struck Norge midships, and she sank in less than one minute, her propellers still turning. Ninety of the crew were rescued from the freezing water, but 101 perished in the battle which had lasted less than 20 minutes.

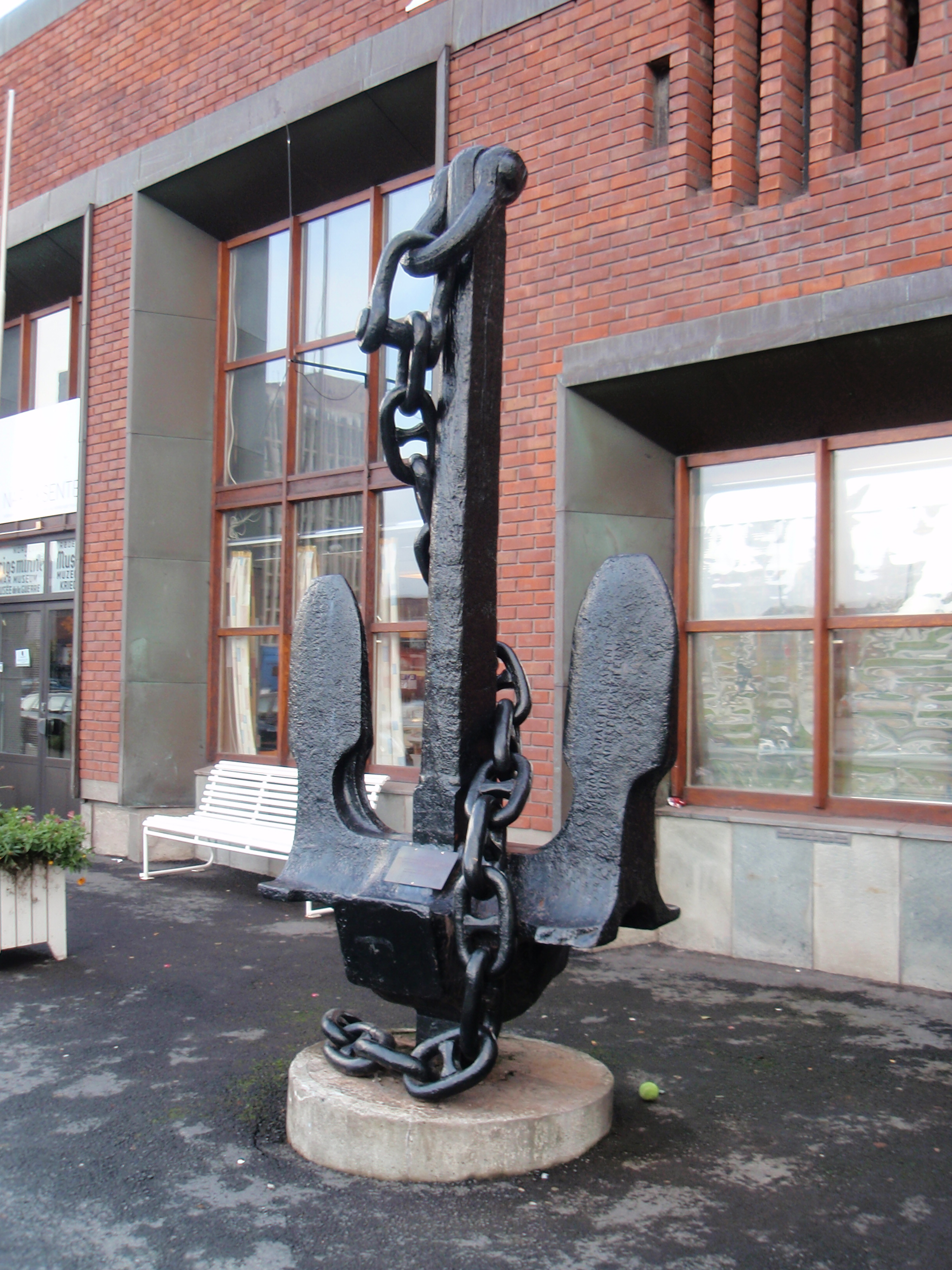
The salvaged anchor of Norge outside the War Museum in Narvik

== The wreck ==
The remains of Norge lie at a depth of about 20 metres (66 ft), in the middle of Narvik harbour. Partly salvaged in situ, it is considered a war memorial and diving on the wreck is prohibited.

== Sources ==
- Abelsen, Frank (1986). Norwegian naval ships 1939–1945 (in Norwegian and English). Oslo: Sem & Stenersen AS. ISBN 82-7046-050-8.
- Campbell, N J M (1979). "Norway". In Gardiner, Robert; Chesneau, Roger; Kolesnik, Eugene M. (eds.). Conway's All the World's Fighting Ships 1860–1905. London: Conway Maritime Press. pp. 369–70. ISBN 0-85177-133-5.
