= Edward L. Atkinson =

Royal Navy surgeon and Antarctic explorer (1881–1929)

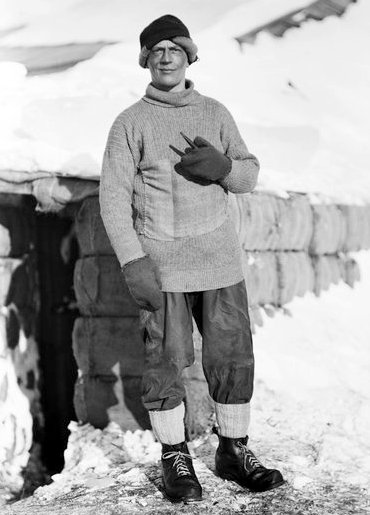
Edward L. Atkinson in 1911

Edward Leicester Atkinson, DSO, AM (23 November 1881 – 20 February 1929) was a Royal Navy surgeon and Antarctic explorer who was a member of the scientific staff of Captain Scott's Terra Nova Expedition, 1910–13. He was in command of the expedition's base at Cape Evans for much of 1912, and led the party which found the tent containing the bodies of Scott, "Birdie" Bowers and Edward Wilson. Atkinson was subsequently associated with two controversies: that relating to Scott's orders concerning the use of dogs, and that relating to the possible incidence of scurvy in the polar party. He is commemorated by the Atkinson Cliffs on the northern coast of Victoria Land, Antarctica, at 71°18′S 168°55′E.

== Background ==
Atkinson was born on 23 November 1881 on Saint Vincent in the Windward Islands, where he spent much of his childhood. He was educated at the Forest School, Snaresbrook, and received his medical training at St Thomas's Hospital, London, where he became the hospital's light heavyweight boxing champion. He qualified in 1906 and two years later joined the Naval Medical Service as a surgeon, based at the Royal Naval Hospital, Haslar, in Gosport, Hampshire. He was primarily a researcher, and had published a paper on gonorrhoeal rheumatism when he was appointed physician and parasitologist to the Terra Nova expedition.

== On the Terra Nova Expedition ==
=== The Southern Journey ===
Sledge flag used by Atkinson in Antarctica during the Terra Nova Expedition

The Terra Nova departed from Cardiff on 15 June 1910. Atkinson was, for the most part, a trusted member of the expedition. According to Harry Pennell, a fellow member of the Terra Nova Expedition, he considered Atkinson as "an out and out gentleman with the quiet self-assurance that makes a man without making him offensive". However, Pennell also privately observed that Atkinson could also "take a dislike to someone on very short acquaintance on very insufficient grounds." The Terra Nova departed from New Zealand on 29 November 1910 and would arrive in the territory of Ross Island in January 1911.

Atkinson spent the winter at Cape Evans base camp mainly doing scientific work. Eleven days before Scott's teams set off towards the pole, Scott gave the dog driver Meares the following written orders at Cape Evans dated 20 October 1911 to secure Scott's speedy return from the pole using dogs:

About the first week of February I should like you to start your third journey to the South, the object being to hasten the return of the third Southern unit [the polar party] and give it a chance to catch the ship. The date of your departure must depend on news received from returning units, the extent of the depot of dog food you have been able to leave at One Ton Camp, the state of the dogs, etc. . ..It looks at present as though you should aim at meeting the returning party about March 1 in Latitude 82 or 82.30.

The march south began on 1 November 1911, and Atkinson departed south with Scott's team, first as a pony leader and later as a man-hauler. The dogs with their dog-driver Meares turned back to base before the ascent of the Beardmore Glacier. By this time, it was becoming likely that Meares would leave the expedition, and Scott reminded Atkinson of the orders concerning the dogs: "with the depot (of dog food) that has been laid at One Ton, come as far as you can". Atkinson and others accompanied Scott during the ascent of the Beardmore Glacier. On 22 December, at the glacier summit, lat. 85deg7'S, Atkinson returned to base with the First Support Party, reaching Cape Evans on 29 January 1912 after a generally straightforward journey.

=== In charge at Cape Evans ===
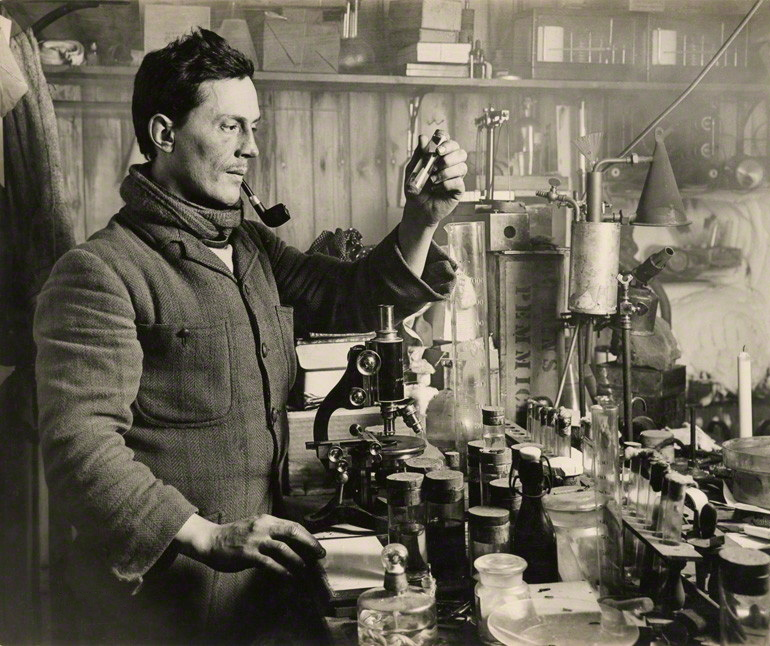
Edward Atkinson in 1911

On his return to Cape Evans, Atkinson took command. He learned that the chief dog driver, Cecil Meares, had resigned from the expedition, was waiting for the ship to take him home and was "not available" for Barrier work. In any case, neither Meares nor anyone else replenished the dog food in the depots. At the beginning of February, the Terra Nova arrived, and Atkinson directed Polar team members to unload supplies, mules and fresh dogs from the Terra Nova, rather than set off with the dogs to meet Scott. In his book The Worst Journey in the World (1922), Cherry-Garrard called this decision a "mistake". In his 1948 "Postscript" to this book, published in the edition of 1951, Cherry-Gerrard elaborated: "In October [1911] Scott issued certain orders: those for the dogs are dated October 20. In these original orders for the dog teams under Meares [...] The third journey was to start about the first week of February [1912]" (p. 583). Then, on page 588, Cherry-Garrard writes: "We reached Cape Evans on January 28. In my opinion he [Atkinson] would not have been fit to take out the dogs in the first week of February".

On 13 February, finally Atkinson arrived at Hut Point with the dog assistant, the Russian Dimitri Gerov and the dogs to avoid being cut off by disintegrating sea ice. Atkinson and Gerov were delayed by bad weather at Hut Point when, on 19 February, Tom Crean arrived on foot from the Barrier and reported that Lt Edward Evans was lying seriously ill in a tent some 35 miles to the south, and in urgent need of rescue. Atkinson decided that this mission was his priority and, during a break in the weather, set out with the dogs to bring Evans back. This was achieved and the party was back at Hut Point on 22 February.

Atkinson sent a note back to the Cape Evans base camp requesting either the meteorologist Wright or Cherry-Garrard to take over the task of meeting Scott with the dogs. Chief meteorologist Simpson however was unwilling to release Wright from his scientific work, and Atkinson therefore selected Apsley Cherry-Garrard. It was still not in Atkinson's mind that Cherry-Garrard's was a relief mission, and according to Cherry-Garrard's account, told him to 'use his judgement' as to what to do in the event of not meeting the polar party by One Ton, and that Scott's orders were that the dogs must not be risked. Cherry-Garrard left with Gerov and the dogs on 26 February, carrying extra rations for the polar party to be added to the depot and 24 days' of dog food. They arrived at One Ton depot on 4 March and did not proceed further south. Instead, he and Gerov decided to feed the dog food generously to the dogs, and after waiting there for Scott for several days, apparently mostly in blizzard conditions (although no blizzard was recorded by Scott some 100 miles further south until 10 March), they returned to Hut Point on 16 March, in poor physical condition and without news of the polar party.

On 17 March, Cherry-Garrard notes in his diary that the base camp members were "anxious" about the Polar party's welfare, and on 26 March Atkinson set out with Patrick Keohane (and without the dogs) on a further attempt to pick up Scott's team. They were able to proceed only to Corner Camp before the weather defeated them on 30 March. At that point, Atkinson recorded, "I was morally certain that the polar party had perished".

Before the full onset of winter Atkinson led yet another journey, this time an attempted rescue of the Northern party, which was known to have been set ashore in the region of Evans Coves, some 200 miles north of Cape Evans. The rescue party set out from Hut Point on 17 April, but they were not able to travel beyond Butter Point at the mouth of the Ferrar Glacier. The subsequent winter at Cape Evans was a difficult and tense time for the depleted expedition crew, but Atkinson maintained a programme of scientific and leisure activities, and managed to hold morale. As winter ended they faced a dilemma: should they first seek to establish the fate of the polar party, or try again to rescue the Northern party? They chose the former course.

=== Scott's tent found ===
On 29 October 1912 Atkinson led a party, with dogs and mules to begin the search for traces of the polar party. On 12 November, 11 miles to the south of One Ton Depot, the tent containing the bodies of Scott, Wilson and Bowers was discovered. Atkinson found Scott's diary and learned the story of the disaster; he then read to the assembled men the relevant sections including those recording the deaths of PO Evans and Captain Oates. A further march south, in search of Oates's body, found only his sleeping bag. On their return to Hut Point on 25 November the search party learned of the safe return of the Northern Party, at which point Victor Campbell, as senior officer, assumed the leadership.

== Controversy: Orders concerning dogs ==
While in command of the base during the critical February–March 1912 period, Atkinson had to execute Scott's instructions about how the dogs were to be employed after their return from the Barrier stage of the polar journey.

However, Scott's orders concerning exactly how the dogs be used did vary, or at least appear to be unclear. In orders to George Simpson and Meares immediately before his departure south, Scott ordered that after their return from accompanying the polar journey the dogs make a second journey over the barrier "to transport to One Ton Camp 5 "XS" rations, or at all hazards 3,....and as much dog food as they can carry", this to be done by 12 January 1912. He also instructed Meares to take the dogs on a third journey over the barrier in early February. It is his orders concerning this journey that appear to be confused: it was initially planned merely to hasten the return of the polar party (in order to give them a chance of catching the ship), and not as a relief mission. However, the instructions Scott gave to Atkinson when the latter turned for home at the top of the Beardmore glacier, were for the dogs to "come as far as they can." Unfortunately, Scott did not clarify his purpose (nor was he asked to – this was a Naval expedition), but perhaps at that stage he was anticipating that the dogs might be needed to see him home.

Meares' resignation from the expedition and unavailability for further work on the barrier resulted in plans being changed, and Scott complicated the situation by taking the dogs much further on the polar journey than had been originally planned, so that they were not back at base until 5 January: the dogs' second barrier journey was never made, and although the minimum 3 XS rations were duly depoted (by a man-hauling party comprising Day, Hooper, Clissold and Nelson), the dog food never was. This may have been due to an oversight, a misunderstanding, a lack of communication, disobedience, or so as not to exhaust the men: the supplies were intended to be transported by dogs (see below). The significance of this omission was only apparent later – it meant that any future movement of the dogs south of One Ton, for rescue purposes or otherwise, would be problematic.

While the omission of two XS rations was less significant than that of the dog food (in the end it was of no significance at all: the polar party never reached One Ton) it did change the purpose of the final journey, in that it was now required to transport these rations, rather than simply aid the party's return.

Once Atkinson was aware that Meares would not make the 'third' journey he, at first, planned to take the dogs himself, and had already reached Hut Point with Dimitri on 13 February where he was beset by bad weather. However, the arrival on 19 February of Crean, with the news that Lashly was lying with the stricken Lt. Evans at Corner Camp, meant further changes of plans. The dogs were first used to effect Evans and Lashly's rescue, meaning it was the 26th before they set out for One Ton. Atkinson also decided his first priority, as a doctor, was to tend to the desperately ill Evans, and so (having been summoned along with Wright from Cape Evans with a message sent via Crean), Cherry-Garrard led the mission. Resourceful and competent as he was, Cherry-Garrard was neither as senior within the expedition as Atkinson, nor as experienced with dogs as Meares, although Atkinson and Cherry-Garrard had become the expedition's next most capable dog drivers under Meares' instruction. He was also significantly more tired than Meares, having manhauled a sledge to the top of the Beardmore glacier and back, and then helped unload the Terra Nova across 20 miles of sea ice between the ship and the mainland; whereas Meares had only travelled as far as the foot of the glacier, driving a dog-team the whole way.

Fiennes argues that Scott was simply "showing flexibility" in changing his plans. But a growing concern that he might need the assistance of the dogs is perhaps evident in Scott's "come as far as you can" order to Atkinson on 22 December – see Southern Journey section above. After dispatching Cherry-Garrard and the dogs to One Ton on 26 February, Atkinson, who was by now aware that there was no dog food at One Ton, wrote: "It cannot be too firmly emphasised that the dog teams were meant merely to hasten the return of the Southern Party and by no means as a relief expedition". According to Cherry-Garrard, Atkinson had instructed him to "use his judgement" in the event of his not meeting Scott at One Ton. His choices were to wait, or to proceed further south, he had six days' dog food in reserve, enough to reach the next depot but no more, without killing dogs for dog meat – he had no other option in the absence of the dog food depot. He was unable to proceed due to bad weather and his concern was that he would be likely to pass Scott's party between depots. Had Scott's team continued on schedule, they would have arrived at the next depot (Mount Hooper) the same day that Cherry-Garrard reached One Ton i.e. 4 March and there was a genuine risk that they would miss each other on the march. If he had not delayed he would have unknowingly reached the next depot two days before Scott but would not have been able to wait before returning to base. Cherry-Garrard invoked instructions, whether from Atkinson or ultimately from Scott is contradictory in his book, which were "never changed", were that the dogs were to be saved for scientific journeys in the following year and were "not to be risked" during the summer and autumn of 1911 – 12. Apparently mindful of the "not to be risked" dictum (and faced with bad weather, eyesight problems, illness and lack of navigating skills) he chose to wait. This decision was commended as correct by Atkinson (and, in light of the poor health in which both men and dogs were on their return, it seems it would have been irresponsible to have done otherwise), but would later cause Cherry-Garrard much distress.

Fiennes asks if some blame might be due to Atkinson (or Meares, or Cherry-Garrard, or Scott himself), but does not come to a definite conclusion. He questions why Meares, who had returned to base on 5 January and must have known that the dog food depot had not been laid, was allowed by Atkinson to wait apparently unoccupied at Cape Evans until catching the ship on 5 March, and Charles Wright was certain that Meares should have been sent to One Ton and not Cherry-Garrard. In later years Atkinson claimed that Meares had "disobeyed orders" (whose?) in not laying the dog food depot, but this could not be backed up in writing.

One should remember, however, that none of the events that changed the ways in which the dogs were deployed and the details of the supplies that were taken to One Ton (the dogs late return from their first journey, Meares' resignation, and the ill-health of Evans) were caused by Atkinson. Furthermore, one should remember the dates: Atkinson did not return himself from the south until 29 January, so had no part in the reasoning to deposit only the minimum 3 XS rations and no dog food at One Ton in early January and no knowledge of it until it was too late; he was unaware of Scott's decision to take five men to the pole (and the subsequent recalculation of rations) until Crean arrived at Hut Point on the 19 February; he had no significant cause for concern for the polar party until Cherry-Garrard and Dimitri's return on 16 March, and even less when they departed on 26 February (his last opportunity to issue instructions to the inexperienced Cherry-Garrard). Perhaps most significantly, it was not until the dogs' return 16 March that he had any reason at all to assume overall command of the expedition: until it was apparent that the polar party would not return, he had simply been the senior (healthy) officer present. One must infer that he did not fully accept this position in his own mind until he and Keohane left Corner Camp on 30 March, when he wrote that he was 'morally certain' of their deaths: he must have held some hope until at least 26 March, otherwise why risk his own, and Keohane's, safety by venturing on to the barrier so late in the season? Since the expedition was run on naval terms, Atkinson may have felt he had no authority to do anything other than carry out Scott's original orders, nor to order Meares to accompany Dimitri and the dogs to One Ton.

Fiennes concludes: "There are many individuals involved with what Scott termed a 'miserable jumble', and all have produced their own versions of what prompted their action or inaction at the time. Scott did not apportion human blame, nor did he accept it."

== Controversy: Scurvy ==
Atkinson was the only medically qualified officer to see the bodies of Scott, Wilson and Bowers. The extent of any detailed examination he made is not known, and no medical report on the causes of death was ever published. However, he reportedly told Cherry-Garrard emphatically that there was no evidence of scurvy in the bodies.

The truth of this statement has been queried by Scott's detractors, on grounds which are largely circumstantial. Scurvy had affected previous Antarctic expeditions, including Scott's with the Discovery, and dietary provision had not improved much meantime. The progressive weakening of the polar party on the return, and of Edgar Evans in particular, sounded like scurvy symptoms. And of course Atkinson's denials may have been intended to preserve the reputation of the expedition – scurvy carried with it a sort of stigma.

The growth in scientific understanding of the nature and causes of scurvy in the years after 1912 may have helped fuel the assumption that Scott and his companions had been affected by it. Even Raymond Priestley of the expedition's scientific staff, who had at one time denied the incidence of scurvy was, fifty years later, beginning to think differently. However, despite the lack of understanding of the causes of the disease that existed in 1912, the symptoms were well-known, and Solomon and Fiennes both point out that it is unthinkable that so scrupulous a scientific observer and physician as Edward Wilson would have made no mention at all of any sign of scurvy in the polar party, had it existed, in his journals and various letters.

== 1914–18 War ==
On his return to England Atkinson worked briefly at the London School of Tropical Medicine on parasitic research, before departing on a medical expedition to China, to investigate a parasitic flatworm that was causing schistosomiasis among British seamen. After the outbreak of World War I Atkinson returned to England and reported for active service. Before he left England for his deployment, he married Jessica Hamilton on 12 August 1915, at a registry office located in Essex. He was sent to Gallipoli to investigate fly-borne diseases, and contracted pleurisy, which left him hospitalised. He spent some time recovering from the illness at a hospital in Malta and kept in touch with Cherry-Garrard during his convalescence.

In 1916 he served on the Western Front and fought at the Somme, receiving the Distinguished Service Order as a medical officer with an artillery brigade. After service in North Russia, on 16 September 1918, Surgeon Lieutenant-Commander Atkinson received horrific injuries from an explosion aboard HMS Glatton in Dover Harbour. Although rendered unconscious by the first explosion and burned and blinded, he was able to rescue several men before escaping, and was awarded the Albert Medal. It was also during the war that Atkinson was approached to be a part of the relief expedition to look for Ernest Shackleton and his crew on the Endurance, which was stranded somewhere in the Weddell Sea. Atkinson was initially reluctant to assist in the effort because of his commitment to the war effort, but upon news of the safe return of Shackleton and his crew back to civilization, he was able to carry on with his wartime duties.

== Later life ==
After the war Atkinson was seconded to the Royal Hellenic Navy to undergo a British naval training mission. He also continued to receive treatments and surgeries for the burns and other wounds he suffered aboard the HMS Glatton explosion in 1918. It was around this time that he would begin to gather up materials on his war-time findings, as well as his Terra Nova Expedition reports. He would later reveal to Cherry-Garrard the results of research he had conducted on the nutritional value of Scott's party's Barrier and Plateau rations. He found that the Barrier rations were generating only 51% of the calories required to support a typical Barrier workload, the corresponding Plateau figure being 57%. These figures provided a substantial explanation (starvation) for the physical failure of the polar party. Thereafter Atkinson continued with his naval career. In 1928 his wife died and he suffered a nervous breakdown. He recovered, however, and within a few months had married again, been promoted Surgeon-Captain and retired from the Royal Navy. On board ship in the Mediterranean on 20 February 1929, on his way back to England, Atkinson died suddenly, at the age of 47, and was buried at sea.

== Legacy ==
Eight years later, Cherry-Garrard wrote an extra preface to the 1937 edition of The Worst Journey, as a tribute to Atkinson. "His voice has been with me often since those days – that gruffish deep affectionate monosyllabic way he used to talk to you ... he could not help the tenderness poking through. I am glad to have this opportunity to witness something of what we owe him."

Atkinson was portrayed by James McKechnie in the 1948 film Scott of the Antarctic, by Timothy Morand in the 1983 television series Shackleton, and by Robin Soans in the 1985 television serial The Last Place on Earth.

== Sources ==
- Cherry-Garrard, Apsley (1983) The Worst Journey in the World Penguin Travel Library Edition. ISBN 0434427454
- Fiennes, Ranulph (2003) Captain Scott Hodder and Stoughton. ISBN 0340826983
- Huntford, Roland (1985) The Last Place on Earth Pan Books
- Scott's Last Expedition, Vols. I and II Smith Elder & Co 1913
- Seaver, George (1983) Foreword to 1965 edition of Cherry-Garrard's Worst Journey, reprinted in Penguin Travel Library Edition
- Solomon, Susan (2001) The Coldest March Yale University Press. ISBN 0300099215
- Wheeler, Sara (2001) Cherry: A life of Apsley Cherry-Garrard Jonathan Cape. ISBN 0224050044
