= Nidaros (disambiguation) =

Nidaros was the medieval name of Trondheim, Norway.

Nidaros may also refer to:

== Military ==
- Camp Nidaros, part of Camp Marmal, a military base in Afghanistan
- HNoMS Nidaros, ships of the Royal Norwegian Navy

== Religion ==
- Nidaros Cathedral, a medieval church in Trondheim, Norway
  - Nidaros Cathedral Boys' Choir
  - Nidaros Cathedral West Front, final part of the Cathedral that was restored
- Nidaros Norwegian Evangelical Lutheran Church, a historic church in Renner, South Dakota, United States
- Nidaros Use, a defunct rite
- Archdiocese of Nidaros, medieval Catholic archdiocese covering Norway
- Diocese of Nidaros, present-day Lutheran diocese covering Trondheim, Norway

== Sports ==
- Nidaros Domers, gridiron football team in Trondheim, Norway
- Nidaros Futsal, futsal club in Trondheim, Norway
- Nidaros Hockey, ice hockey team in Trondheim, Norway
- Nidaros Jets, a team in the Basketligaen Norge basketball league
- Nidaros Roller Derby, women's roller derby league in Trondheim, Norway

== Other uses ==
- Nidaros (newspaper), a former newspaper in Trondheim, Norway
- Nidaros Township, Minnesota, United States

== See also ==
- List of churches in Nidaros
