= HMS Glatton (1914) =

British Gorgon-class monitor ship

Coordinates: 51.117°N 1.315°E

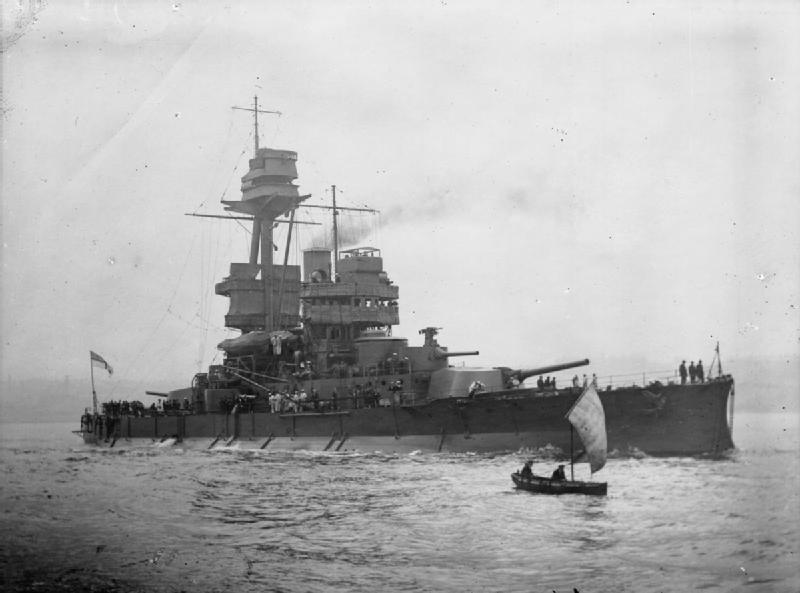
- Glatton during World War I

History

United Kingdom
- Name: HMS Glatton
- Builder: Armstrong Whitworth
- Laid down: 26 May 1913
- Launched: 8 August 1914
- Commissioned: 31 August 1918
- Fate: Wrecked by explosion, 16 September 1918

General characteristics
- Class & type: Gorgon-class monitor
- Displacement: 5,746 long tons (5,838.2 t) at deep load
- Length: 310 ft (94.5 m)
- Beam: 73 ft 7 in (22.4 m) at bulge; 55 ft (16.8 m) at main hull
- Draught: 16 ft 4 in (5.0 m)
- Installed power: 4,000 ihp (3,000 kW)
- Propulsion: 2 × shafts, 2 × vertical triple expansion steam engines; 4 × dual-fired Yarrow water-tube boilers with oil sprayers
- Speed: 12 knots (22 km/h; 14 mph)
- Range: 2,700 nmi (5,000 km; 3,100 mi) at 11 knots (20 km/h; 13 mph)
- Complement: 305
- Armament: 2 × 9.2 in (234 mm) Mk XII guns; 4 × 1 - BL 6 inch Mk XVIII guns; 2 × 1 - QF 3 inch 20 cwt gun anti-aircraft guns; 4 × 3-pounder anti-aircraft guns; 2 × 2-pounder anti-aircraft guns
- Armour: Belt: 3–7 in (7.6–17.8 cm); Bulkheads: 3–4 in (7.6–10.2 cm); Gun turret 8 in (20 cm); Conning Tower: 8 in (20 cm); Deck: 1–2.5 in (2.5–6.4 cm)

HMS Glatton and her sister ship Gorgon were originally built as coastal defence ships for the Royal Norwegian Navy, as Bjørgvin and Nidaros respectively. She was requisitioned from Norway at the beginning of World War I, but was not completed until 1918 although she had been launched over three years earlier. On 16 September 1918, before she had even gone into action, she suffered a large fire in one of her 6-inch magazines, and had to be scuttled to prevent an explosion of her main magazines that would have devastated Dover. Her wreck was partially salvaged in 1926, and moved into a position in the northeastern end of the harbour where it would not obstruct traffic. It was subsequently buried by landfill underneath the current car ferry terminal.

== Background ==
Bjørgvin was ordered by Norway in 1913 to supplement the older Eidsvold and Tordenskjold classes of coastal defence ships. She would have been known in Norway as P/S Bjørgvin; P/S stands for Panserskip ("armoured ship"), while Bjørgvin was the old name for the Norwegian city of Bergen. However, when World War I broke out, the Royal Navy requisitioned most warships under construction in Britain for foreign powers and refunded the two-thirds of Bjørgvin's £370,000 purchase price already paid by the Norwegians.

== Construction and description ==
Bjørgvin was laid down by Armstrong Whitworth at Elswick on 26 May 1913 and launched on 8 August 1914. She was renamed Glatton after an earlier breastwork monitor of 1871. Her completion was greatly delayed by the modifications made by the British, which included modifying the boilers to use both oil and coal and conversion of 12 double-bottom tanks to carry the oil. This work began on 9 January 1915, but was suspended the following May, when it was estimated that only another 10–12 months of work remained, to allow for faster progress to be made on the large light cruisers Furious and Courageous that were building in Armstrong's Naval Yard downriver. In September 1917, work was resumed to a new design that added a large anti-torpedo bulge along about 75% of the hull's length, suppression of the torpedo tubes and 100-millimetre (3.9 in) guns planned by the Norwegians, and a large tripod mast was to be fitted behind the single funnel to carry the directors for both the 6-inch (152 mm) and 9.2-inch (234 mm) guns. Both of these guns had to be relined to use standard British ammunition and the mount for the 9.2-inch gun was modified to give a maximum elevation of 40° which gave the gun a maximum range of 39,000 yards (36,000 m). Addition of the bulges cost 2 knots (3.7 km/h; 2.3 mph) in speed, but prevented the extra weight resulting from all of these changes from deepening her draft. She was finally completed on 8 September 1918.

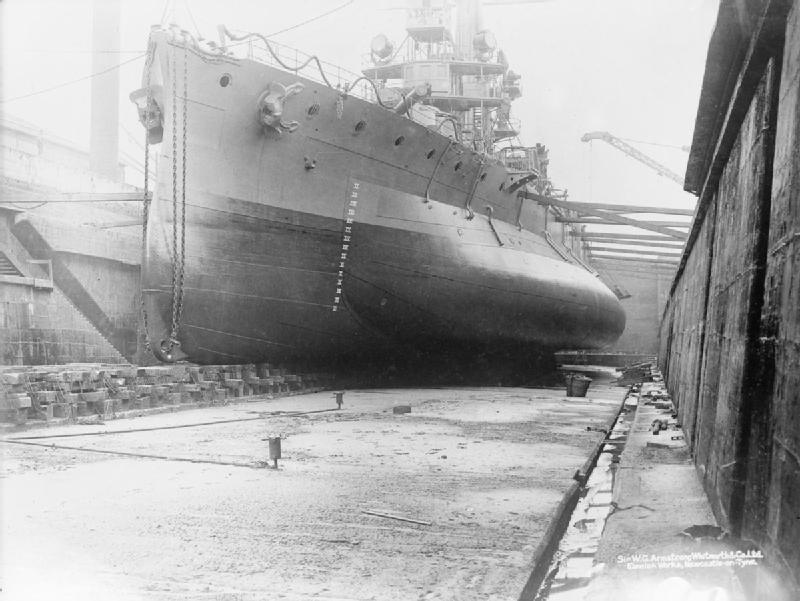
Glatton in drydock. Note the width of the torpedo bulge

Glatton displaced 5,746 long tons (5,838 t) at deep load as built, with a length of 310 ft (94 m), a beam of 73 feet 7 inches (22.4 m) at maximum, although her main hull only had a beam of 55 feet (16.8 m) and a draught of 16 feet 4 inches (5.0 m). She was powered by two vertical triple expansion steam engines, which developed a total of 4,000 indicated horsepower (3,000 kW) from four Yarrow watertube boilers and gave a maximum speed of 12 knots (22 km/h; 14 mph).

She was armed with two 9.2-inch guns arranged in two single-gun turrets, one each fore and aft. Her secondary armament consisted of four six-inch guns, also in single-gun turrets, two of which superfired over the 9.2-inch turrets. The other two were positioned on each side of the superstructure. One 3 in (76 mm) anti-aircraft gun was mounted on each center-line 6-inch turret. She also carried four 3-pounder and two 2-pounder guns on high-angle mounts.

== Fate ==
After completion, Glatton sailed for Dover on 11 September 1918 to prepare for the offensive planned for later that month. At 6:15 on the evening of 16 September, Glatton's midships 6-inch magazine had a low-order explosion that ignited the cordite stored there. Flames shot through the roof of 'Q' turret, starboard midside, and started to spread aft. The ship's captain, Commander Neston Diggle had been walking along the cliffs with Vice-Admiral Roger Keyes when they heard the explosion and both men quickly returned to the harbour.

Diggle boarded the burning vessel and found that the only surviving officer on board was a junior surgeon. The captain took control of the situation and ordered the opening of the seacocks in the magazines to prevent further explosions. The forward magazines were flooded successfully, but the crew were unable to flood the rear magazines as the flames blocked access to the magazine flooding controls. The presence of the ammunition ship Gransha only 150 yards (140 m) away risked a massive explosion that would devastate Dover if Glatton's rear magazine exploded and set off Gransha's ammunition.

Keyes boarded the recently arrived destroyer Cossack once apprised of the danger. He ordered Cossack to torpedo Glatton in an attempt to flood the magazine before it detonated. Cossack's first 18-inch (460 mm) torpedo struck the anti-torpedo bulge amidships, but failed to explode because it had been fired too close to Glatton. Her second torpedo blew a hole in Glatton at 7:40, but the torpedo's 200-pound (91 kg) warhead was too small to penetrate through her bulge and Glatton remained afloat, still burning. Keyes transferred to the destroyer Myngs and ordered her to fire on Glatton with her 21-inch (530 mm) torpedoes at 8:15. They were aimed at the hole blown in Glatton's starboard side by Cossack's second torpedo and succeeded in causing Glatton to capsize until her masts and superstructure rested on the harbour bottom and dousing the fire. Casualties were heavy: 60 men were killed outright and 124 were injured of whom 19 later died of their burns. The Antarctic explorer Edward L. Atkinson, although rendered unconscious by the first explosion and burned and blinded, was able to rescue several men before escaping, and was awarded the Albert Medal.

=== Inquiry ===
A Court of Enquiry held immediately afterwards found that the explosion had occurred in the midships 6-inch magazine situated between the boiler and engine rooms. The cause was more difficult to establish, but the Court did note that the stokers were in the habit of piling the red-hot clinker and ashes from the boilers against the bulkhead directly adjoining the magazine to cool down before they were sent up the ash ejector. The magazine was well insulated with 5 inches (13 cm) of cork, covered by wood planking .75 inches (1.9 cm) thick and provided with special cooling equipment so it was not likely that the cordite had spontaneously combusted. The magazine of Glatton's sister ship Gorgon was emptied and examined. The red lead paint on the bulkhead was blistered beneath the lagging and tests at the National Physical Laboratory demonstrated that it had been subject to temperatures of at least 400 °F (204 °C). Recorded temperatures inside the magazine did not exceed 83 °F (28 °C) and a test of red-hot ashes was inconclusive as the temperature in the lagging only reached 70 °F (21 °C) with occasional hot spots of 150 °F (66 °C). Other tests did reveal that the cork could give off flammable fumes under high heat and pressurized air. While not entirely satisfied with this conclusion, the Court found in April 1919 that "The slow combustion of the cork lagging of the 6-inch midship magazine of the Glatton led to the ignition of the magazine and then to the ignition of the cordite in it and so caused the explosion."

As a precaution, Gorgon's lagging was stripped out and replaced with silicate wool, revealing the real cause. Part of the cork was missing and folded newspapers were found in the empty space which were left there by the dockyard workers during construction. Furthermore, a number of rivets were entirely missing which meant that 0.5 inches (12.7 mm) holes were present, which could have allowed the hot ashes to ignite the newspapers. The forced-draught pressure in the boiler room would have supplied air through the rivet holes, causing the cork to give off flammable gases, and eventually ignite the cordite charges.

=== Aftermath ===
Glatton remained in Dover Harbour, an obstruction to shipping, with her hull visible at low tide as the Harbour Board could not afford the £45,000 quoted on average by salvage companies. Finally they asked the Harbourmaster, Captain John Iron, if he could do it for less. He estimated it would cost about £5,000 if he was granted use of the salvage craft already at Dover. The Board accepted his offer and work began in May 1925. Some 12,000 short tons (11,000 t) of silt were removed from underneath Glatton and her mainmast and superstructure were blasted away from the wreck. Four lifting lighters, with a capacity of 1,000 long tons (1,000 t), were hired, but they would not suffice to lift a water-logged 5,000 long tons (5,100 t) ship. It was necessary to seal all of the holes on her topside and pump air into each compartment at a rate of 70,000 cubic feet (2,000 m^{3}) per minute to restore her buoyancy. The first attempt to lift her began on 2 December 1925 and was successful in breaking the suction holding her to the bottom in combination with the rising tide. That was enough for the first try and the major lifting effort began the following day. Slowly she was moved, taking advantage of the tides, until on 16 March 1926 she was moved to a deep gully next to the western pier of the submarine harbour, close by the shore. The total cost was considerably more than originally estimated, but still far less than that quoted by the salvage companies, at no more than £12,000. There she remains, buried by landfill underneath the current car ferry terminal.

== Memorial ==
A memorial was erected at St Mary's Church and Grange Road cemetery in Gillingham, Kent. The cemetery was used from 1867 until 1973 when the site was largely cleared of memorials to provide a community open space for the local population. Then Woodlands Road Cemetery was used and this is the current site of HMS Glatton's Memorial, with the graves of one officer and 56 men.

== See also ==
- Edward L. Atkinson awarded the Albert Medal
