= HMS Gorgon (1914) =

Gorgon-class British monitors

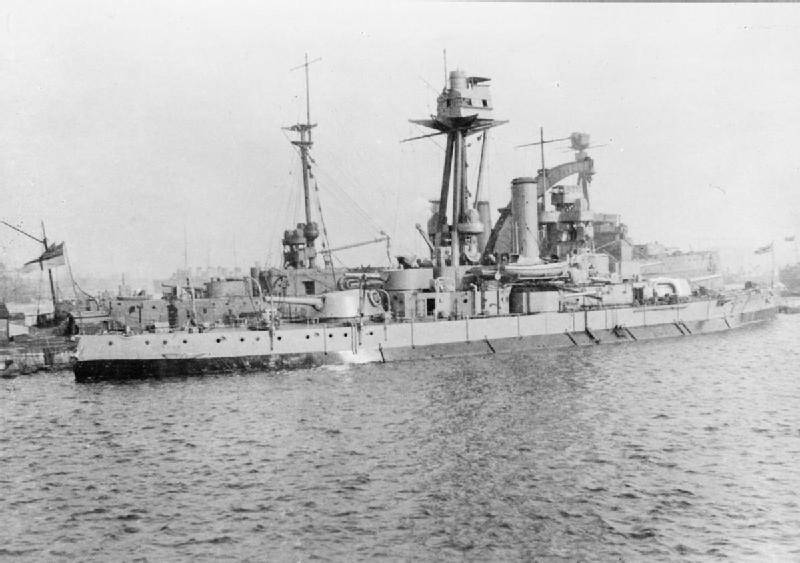
- HMS Gorgon

History

United Kingdom
- Name: HMS Gorgon
- Builder: Armstrong Whitworth
- Laid down: 11 June 1913
- Launched: 9 June 1914
- Commissioned: 1 May 1918
- Decommissioned: September 1919
- Fate: Sold for scrap, 26 August 1928

General characteristics
- Class & type: Gorgon-class monitor
- Displacement: 5,746 long tons (5,838.2 t) at deep load
- Length: 310 ft (94.5 m)
- Beam: 73 ft 7 in (22.4 m) at bulge; 55 ft (16.8 m) at main hull
- Draught: 16 ft 4 in (5.0 m)
- Installed power: 4,000 ihp (2,982.8 kW)
- Propulsion: 2 × shafts, 2 × Vertical triple expansion steam engines; 4 × Yarrow dual-fired water-tube boilers with oil sprayers
- Speed: 12 knots (22 km/h; 14 mph)
- Range: 2,700 nmi (5,000 km; 3,100 mi) at 11 knots (20 km/h; 13 mph)
- Complement: 305
- Armament: 2 × 9.2 in (234 mm) Mk XII guns; 4 × 1 - BL 6 inch Mk XVIII guns; 2 × 1 - QF 3 inch 20 cwt gun anti-aircraft guns; 4 × 3-pounder anti-aircraft guns; 4 × 2-pounder anti-aircraft guns
- Armour: Belt: 3–7 in (7.6–17.8 cm); Bulkheads: 3–4 in (7.6–10.2 cm); Gun turret: 8 in (20 cm); Conning Tower: 8 in (20 cm); Deck: 1–2.5 in (2.5–6.4 cm)

HMS Gorgon and her sister ship Glatton were two monitors originally built as coastal defence ships for the Royal Norwegian Navy, as HNoMS Nidaros and Bjørgvin respectively, by Armstrong Whitworth at Elswick. She was purchased from Norway at the beginning of the First World War, but was not completed until 1918 although she had been launched over three years earlier. She engaged targets in Occupied Flanders for the last several months of the war and fired the last shots of the war against such targets on 15 October 1918. She was used as a target ship after several attempts to sell her had fallen through before being sold for scrap in 1928.

== Background ==
Nidaros was ordered by Norway in 1913 to supplement the older Eidsvold and Tordenskjold classes of coastal defense ships. She would have been known in Norway as P/S Nidaros; P/S stands for Panserskip ("armoured ship"), while Nidaros was the old name for the Norwegian city of Trondheim. However, when the First World War broke out, the Royal Navy requisitioned most warships under construction in Britain for foreign powers and refunded the two-thirds of the Bjørgvin's £370,000 purchase price already paid by the Norwegians.

== Construction and description ==
Nidaros was laid down by Armstrong Whitworth at Elswick on 11 June 1913 and launched on 9 June 1914. She was renamed as Gorgon, after an earlier breastwork monitor of 1871. Her completion was greatly delayed by the modifications made by the British, which included modifying the boilers to use both oil and coal and conversion of 12 double-bottom tanks to carry oil. This work began on 9 January 1915, but was suspended the following May, when it was estimated that only another 10–12 months of work remained, to allow for faster progress to be made on the large light cruisers Furious and Courageous that were building in Armstrong's Naval Yard downriver. In September 1917, work was resumed on a new design that added a large anti-torpedo bulge along about 75% of the hull's length, suppression of the torpedo tubes and the 100-millimetre (3.9 in) guns planned by the Norwegians, and a large tripod mast was fitted behind the single funnel to carry the directors for both the 6-inch (152 mm) and 9.2-inch (230 mm) guns. Both of these guns had to be relined to use standard British ammunition and the mount for the 9.2-inch gun was modified to give a maximum elevation of 40° which gave the gun a maximum range of 39,000 yards (36,000 m). Addition of the bulges cost 2 knots (3.7 km/h; 2.3 mph) in speed, but prevented the extra weight resulting from all of these changes from deepening her draft. She was finally completed on 4 June 1918.

Gorgon displaced 5,700 long tons (5,800 t) at deep load as built, with a length of 310 feet (94.5 m), a beam of 73 feet 7 inches (22.4 m) at maximum, although her main hull only had a beam of 55 feet (16.8 m) and a draught of 16 feet 4 inches (5.0 m). She was powered by two vertical triple expansion steam engines, which developed a total of 4,000 indicated horsepower (3,000 kW) from four Yarrow dual-fired watertube boilers and gave a maximum speed of 12 knots (22 km/h; 14 mph).

She was armed with two 9.2-inch guns arranged in two single-gun turrets, one turret each fore and aft. Her secondary armament consisted of four six-inch guns, also in single gun turrets, two of which superfired over the 9.2-inch turrets and the others were positioned on each side of the superstructure. One 3 in (76 mm) anti-aircraft gun was mounted on each center-line six-inch turret. She also carried four 3-pounder and four 2-pounder guns on high-angle mounts.

== Service ==
Gorgon arrived at Dover on 6 June 1918 where she spent the next five weeks working up. Her first engagement was on 26 July when she fired eight rounds at a range of 33,000 yards (30,000 m) at a German howitzer battery to calibrate her guns and fire control system, which provoked a response from the German 380-millimetre (15 in) gun of Batterie Pommern south of Ostend. Three days later, she accompanied Marshal Soult on a bombardment of Batterie "Tirpitz". She spent the next month and a half either out on patrol in the English Channel or preparing for the bombardment scheduled for the end of September in support of a major offensive along the coast.

At daybreak on 28 September 1918, Gorgon, in company with General Wolfe, anchored about 7 mi (6.1 nmi; 11 km) off De Panne, Belgium and opened fire about 7:15 on a bridge at Snaeskerke, Belgium at a range of 36,000 yd (33,000 m). Conditions were not good as both wind and tide were against her. Gorgon's stern anchor cable parted and she swung around on her bow anchor so that only her rear turret could bear on the target. No aircraft were made available to spot for her so there was little chance of a hit and she only fired eleven rounds. She, and the other monitors, were attacked several times during the day by German aircraft with little effect and several coast defense batteries attempted to engage them through the smokescreen put up by the motor launches supporting the operation. She fired thirteen shells the next day in another attempt to destroy the bridge and claimed one hit although this was not confirmed by subsequent observations.

On 14 October, she repeated the experience, except that her target was now the Middelkerke batteries. She fired 41 rounds during the morning at a range of 26,000 yards (24,000 m), but she accompanied Vice-Admiral Keyes in the destroyer Termagant in a reconnaissance mission to see if the Germans were still holding the coast in strength. The fire of the Tirpitz and Raversyde Batteries soon disabused them of any notions to the contrary and Gorgon was forced to turn away at maximum speed (14 knots (26 km/h; 16 mph)), which was faster than she'd made on trials, when they straddled her and hit her with splinters from the near-misses. The following day she returned to her original target and fired 30 rounds in 20 minutes. These were the last rounds fired by British monitors against German batteries on the Belgian coast.

She was sent to Portsmouth after the end of the war where she was made available to investigate the cause of her sister ship Glatton's magazine explosion. She was moved to Devonport as a temporary tender to the stone frigate Vivid in April 1919. She was paid off on 31 August and joined the Reserve Fleet in September. She was offered back to the Norwegians, but they rejected her as unsuitable to their requirements, especially since she was now too broad for their dock at Horten. Several attempts were made to sell her, but she was disarmed in 1922 and used as a target ship to evaluate the effects of bombs bursting underwater near a ship and the effects of six-inch gunfire. She was finally sold for scrap on 26 August 1928 and broken up at the former naval dockyard at Pembroke.
