= Bjørgvin-class coastal defence ship =

WW1 Royal Navy monitors originally built for Norway

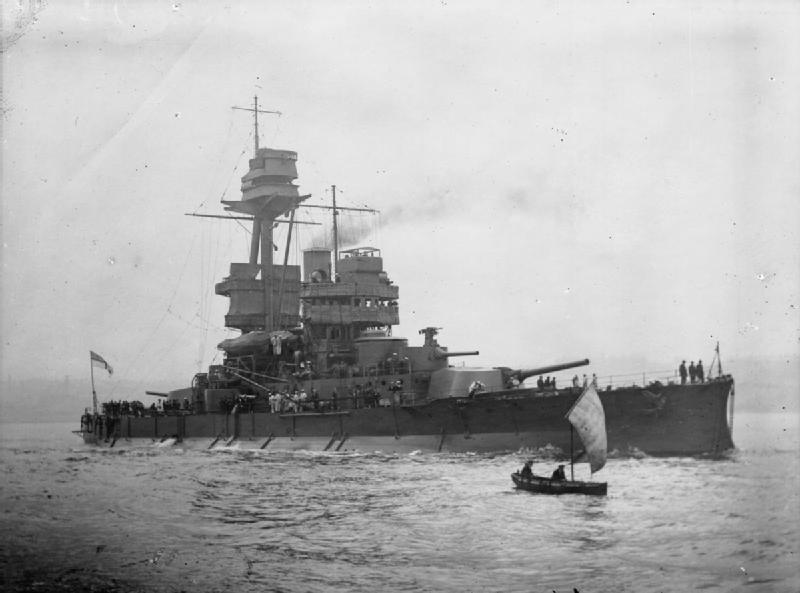
- Bjørgvin as HMS Glatton

Class overview
- Operators: Royal Navy
- Preceded by: Eidsvold class
- Succeeded by: None
- Built: 1912–1914
- In commission: 1914–1928
- Completed: 2
- Lost: 1

General characteristics
- Type: Coastal defence ship
- Displacement: 4,900 long tons (4,979 t)
- Length: 94 m (308 ft 5 in)
- Beam: 16.8 m (55 ft 1 in)
- Draught: 5.4 m (17 ft 9 in)
- Propulsion: Coal-fired reciprocating steam engines, 4,000 shp (2,983 kW)
- Speed: 15 knots (17 mph; 28 km/h)
- Complement: 305
- Armament: 2 × 24 cm (9.4 in) guns; 4 × 15 cm (5.9 in) guns; 6 × 10 cm (3.9 in) guns; 2 × submerged torpedo tubes
- Armour: Belt: 7 in (180 mm); Bulkheads: 4 in (100 mm); Barbettes: 8 in (200 mm); Turrets: 8 in (200 mm); Decks: 2.5 in (64 mm); Conning tower: 8 in (200 mm)

The Bjørgvin-class coastal battleships were ordered by Norway in 1912 to supplement the older Eidsvold and Tordenskjold-class coastal defence ships. The two ships laid down were compulsorily purchased by the British government for the Royal Navy when World War I broke out, and classified as monitors. The British government paid Norway £370,000 as compensation for each ship.

== Ships in class ==
- Bjørgvin (1912) - Compulsorily purchased by the British government and renamed HMS Glatton, blew up in a September 1918 accident.
- Nidaros (1912) - Compulsorily purchased by the British government and renamed HMS Gorgon.

== Description ==
The Bjørgvin class would be significantly more heavily armed than the previous Eidsvold class:

- Two 24 cm/50 guns, which in British service were relined to use standard British ammunition and became 9.2"/51. These were considered among the longest-ranged guns in the world in 1918. As designed, they would have fired a 190 kg (420 lb) projectile with a muzzle velocity of 884 m/s (2,900 ft/s), capable of penetrating 22.2 cm (8.7 in) of face-hardened armour at a range of 7,000 m (7,700 yd).
- Four 15 cm/50 each in a single turret - one aft, one fore, two midships (one on either side). In British service they were relined to take standard 6 inches (15 cm) ammunition.
- Six 10 cm (3.9 in) guns.
- Two submerged torpedo tubes.

In addition to the heavier armament, the two ships of the Bjørgvin class were also significantly better armoured, with her armour better distributed:

- 7 inches (18 cm) thick armour in the belt
- 8 inches (20 cm) thick armour on the turrets
- 8 inches (20 cm) thick armour in the barbettes
- 2.5 inches (6.4 cm) thick armoured deck
- 8 inches (20 cm) thick armour on the conning tower
- 4 inches (10 cm) thick armoured bulkheads
