= Eidsvold-class coastal defence ship =

Class of Norwegian coastal defence ships

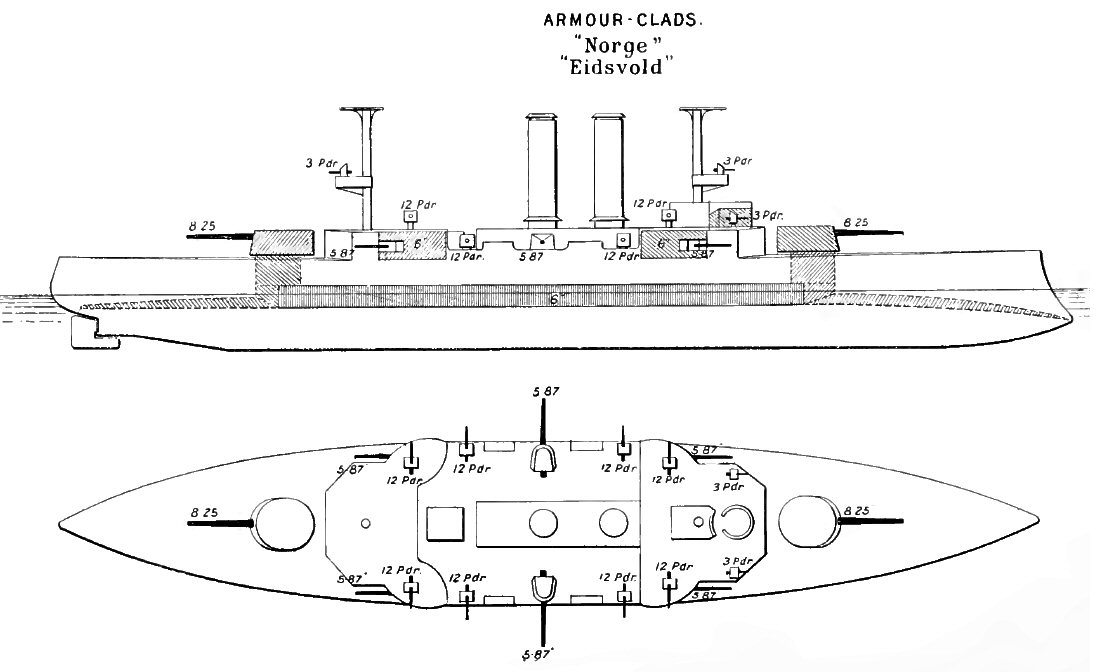

Class overview
- Builders: Armstrong Whitworth, UK
- Operators: Royal Norwegian Navy
- Preceded by: Tordenskjold class
- Succeeded by: Bjørgvin class
- Completed: 2
- Lost: 2

General characteristics
- Type: Coastal defence ship
- Displacement: 4,233 tons
- Length: 94.60 m (310.4 ft)
- Beam: 15.70 m (51.5 ft)
- Draft: 5.40 m (17.7 ft)
- Propulsion: Reciprocating steam engines; Coal-fired boilers; 4,500 shp (3,355.6 KW)
- Speed: 17.2 knots (31.8 km/h)
- Complement: 270
- Armament: 2 × 21 cm (8.26 in) guns; 6 × 15 cm (5.90 in) guns; 8 × 7.6 cm (3 in) guns; 4 × BR 4.7 cm/50 cal. (3-pounder); 2 × 45 cm (18 in) submerged torpedo tubes
- Armour: Belt: 6 in (15.24 cm); Turrets: 9 in (22.86 cm)

The Eidsvold class was a class of coastal defence ships, two of which were built for the Royal Norwegian Navy in 1899 by Armstrong Whitworth. The class consisted of two ships, HNoMS Eidsvold and HNoMS Norge. Locally they were referred to as panserskip (lit.: armoured ship).

== Description ==
Built as part of the general rearmament in the time leading up to the events in 1905, the two ships of the Eidsvold class remained, along with the slightly older Tordenskjold class, the backbone of the Norwegian Navy until the German invasion of Norway in 1940. Norge and Eidsvold were the largest vessels in the Norwegian Navy, displacing 4,233 tons and crewed by 270 men. It was intended to augment the two ships of the Bjørgvin class, ordered in 1912, but both ships were compulsorily purchased by the British government after the outbreak of World War I. Obsolete by the time of the German invasion, both Eidsvold-class ships were sunk during the first Battle of Narvik.

The Eidsvold class carried a mixed armament, typical of coastal defense ships:

- Two 21 cm (8.26 inch) guns mounted in turrets fore and aft as the main armament
- Six 15 cm (5.90 inch) guns, mounted three on either side in casemates as the secondary armament
- Eight 7.60 cm (3 inch) guns, four mounted in the battery (two on either side) and the remaining four mounted fore and aft
- Four 4.7 cm (1.85 inch / 3-pounder) rapid-fire guns for use against torpedo boats
- Two submerged torpedo tubes

The Eidsvold class was armoured to withstand battle with ships of a similar class, but the underwater armour and internal partitioning were not designed to withstand torpedo hits, which caused both ships' demise:

- 6 inches (15.24 cm) of Krupp cemented armour in the belt.
- 9 inches (22.86 cm) of the same armour on the main gun turrets.

== Ships in class ==
=== HNoMS Eidsvold ===
- Builder: Armstrong Whitworth
- Laid down:
- Launched: June 14, 1900
- Commissioned:
- Operations: Operation Weserübung
- Victories: None
- Fate: Sunk by German destroyer Wilhelm Heidkamp at Narvik on 9 April 1940

=== HNoMS Norge ===
- Builder: Armstrong Whitworth
- Laid down:
- Launched: March 1900
- Commissioned:
- Operations: Operation Weserübung
- Victories: None
- Fate: Sunk by German destroyer Bernd von Arnim at Narvik on 9 April 1940

== Gallery ==
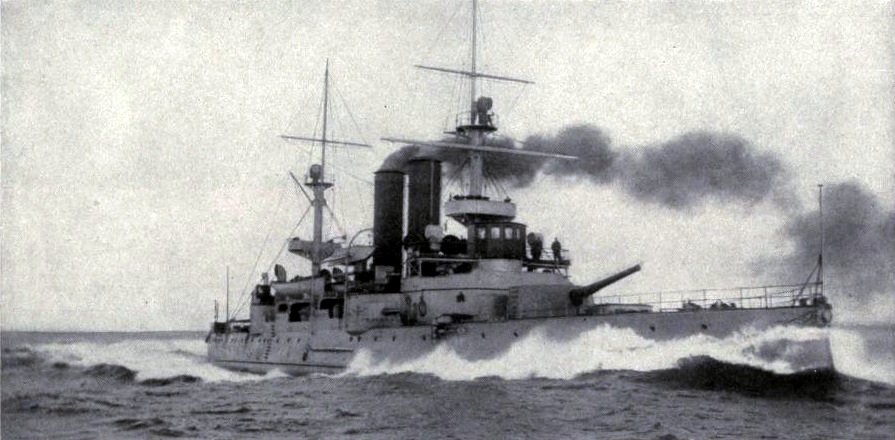
KNMS Norge coastal battleship

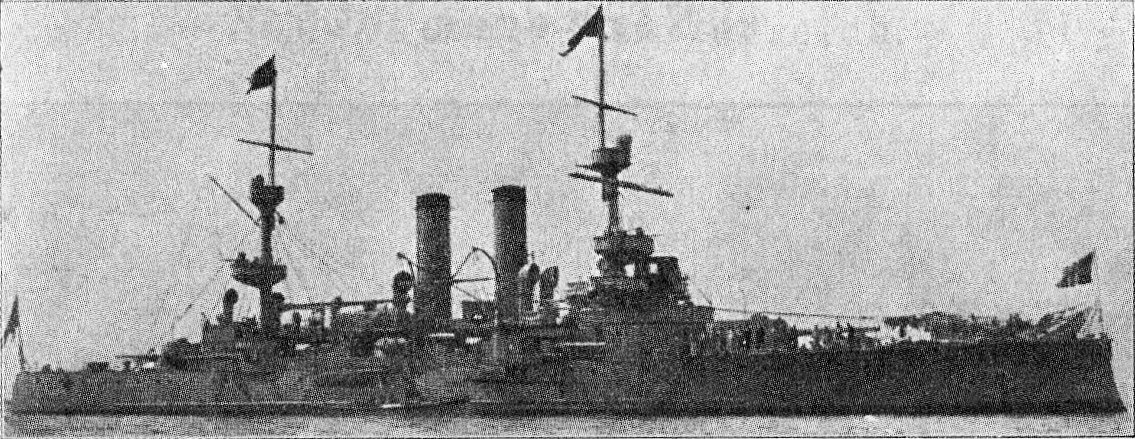
KNMS Eidsvold coastal battleship

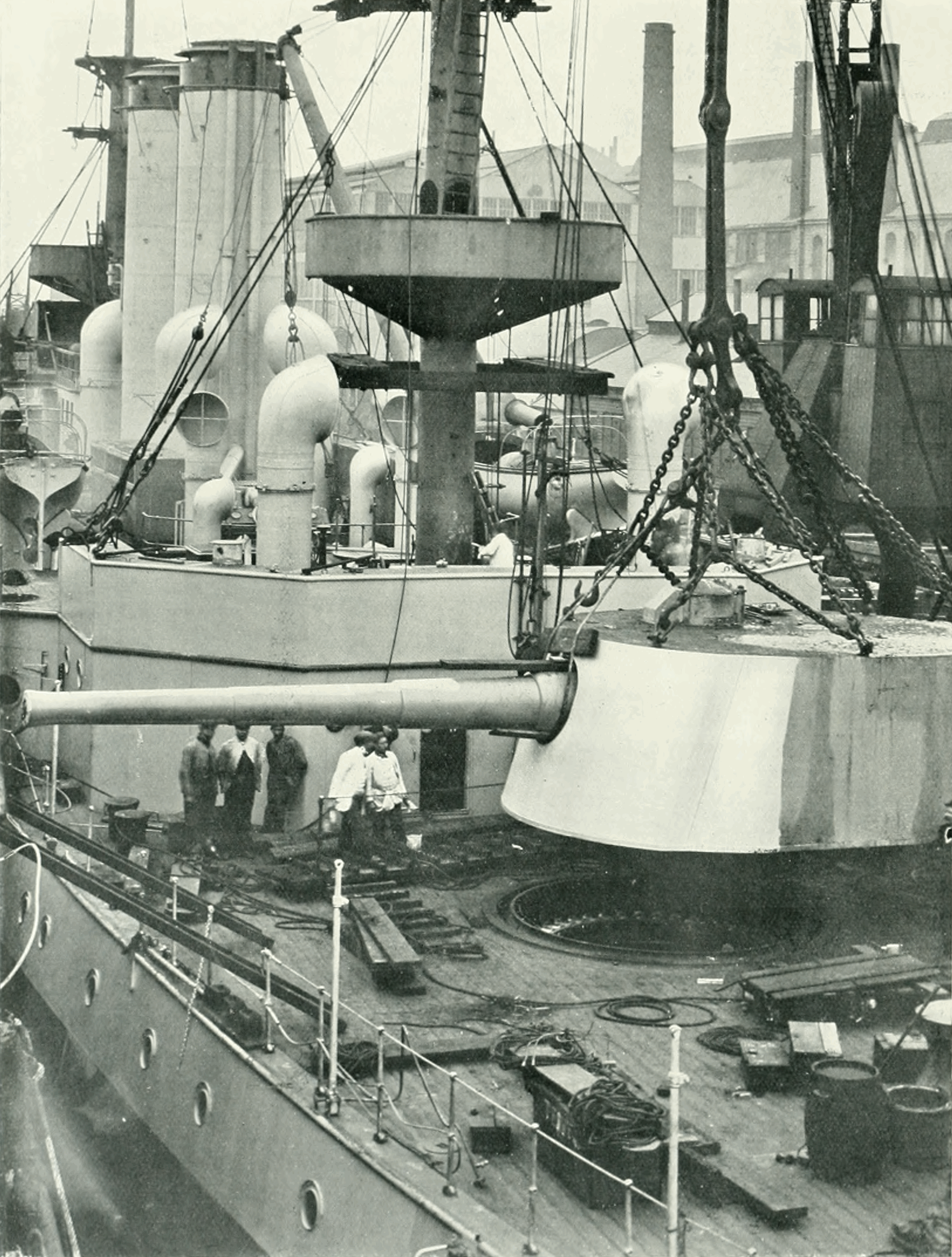
A 21 cm (8.26 in) gun turret being installed on Eidsvold.
