= Tordenskjold-class coastal defence ship =

Norwegian ship class

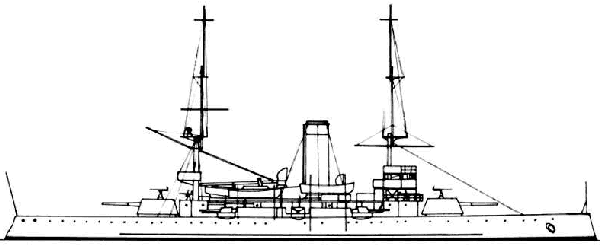
- Plans of panserskipet Tordenskjold

Class overview
- Name: Tordenskjold class
- Builders: Armstrong, Mitchell & Co.
- Operators: Royal Norwegian Navy
- Preceded by: None
- Succeeded by: Eidsvold class
- Built: 1897–1898
- In commission: 1898–1948
- Completed: 2
- Scrapped: 2

General characteristics
- Type: Coastal defence ship
- Displacement: 3,858 long tons (3,920 t)
- Length: 92.66 m (304 ft 0 in) (oa); 85.34 m (280 ft 0 in) pp
- Beam: 14.78 m (48 ft 6 in)
- Draught: 5.38 m (17 ft 8 in)
- Installed power: 3 cylindrical boilers; 4,500 ihp (3,356 kW)
- Propulsion: 2 × triple-expansion steam engines
- Speed: 16.9 knots (31.3 km/h; 19.4 mph)
- Complement: 245
- Armament: 2 × 21 cm (8.3 in) guns; 6 × 12 cm (4.7 in) guns; 6 × 12-pdr (76 mm (3 in)) guns; 6 × 1-pdr QF guns; 2 × 45 cm (17.7 in) torpedo tubes
- Armour: Harvey armor; Belt : 7–4 in (178–102 mm); Turrets : 8–5 in (203–127 mm)

The Tordenskjold class of coastal defence ships was ordered by Norway as part as the general rearmament in the time leading up to the events in 1905 - when Norway broke out of the union with Sweden - the two ships in the class (Tordenskjold and Harald Haarfagre) remained the backbone (alongside the slightly newer Eidsvold class) of the Royal Norwegian Navy until they were considered 'unfit for war' in the mid-1930s.

== Description ==
Designed and built as typical pre-dreadnought battleships, although on a scale more suited to the fjords and narrow waters of Norway, the Tordenskjold class carried guns in a wide range of calibers:

- Two 21 cm/45 (8.2 inch) guns in turrets fore and aft as the main armament.
- Six 12 cm/45 (4.7 inch), mounted three on each side in a central battery, as the secondary armament.
- Six 7.6 cm/40 (3 inch) guns, also mounted in the central battery, as the tertiary armament.
- Six 1-pdr Quick Fire guns. These were meant to be used against torpedo boats.

The Tordenskjold class was armoured to withstand battle with ships of a similar class, but her protection system could not withstand attacks from heavier ships nor underwater attacks very well:

- 7 inch (17.78 cm) Harvey armour in the belt
- 8 inch (20.32 cm) of the same armour on the turrets

== Fate ==
Both ships were phased out from active duty in the mid-1930s, and were used as training vessels. After the German invasion of Norway in 1940, they were taken by the Germans and turned into floating Flak batteries. After the war they were returned to the Royal Norwegian Navy and served as barracks for a short time before they were sold for scrapping.

== Ships ==
Construction data
Ship name	Laid down	Launched	Commissioned
Harald Haarfagre	18 March 1896	4 January 1897	10 June 1897
Tordenskjold	18 March 1896	10 Mar 1897	2 April 1898

== Gallery ==
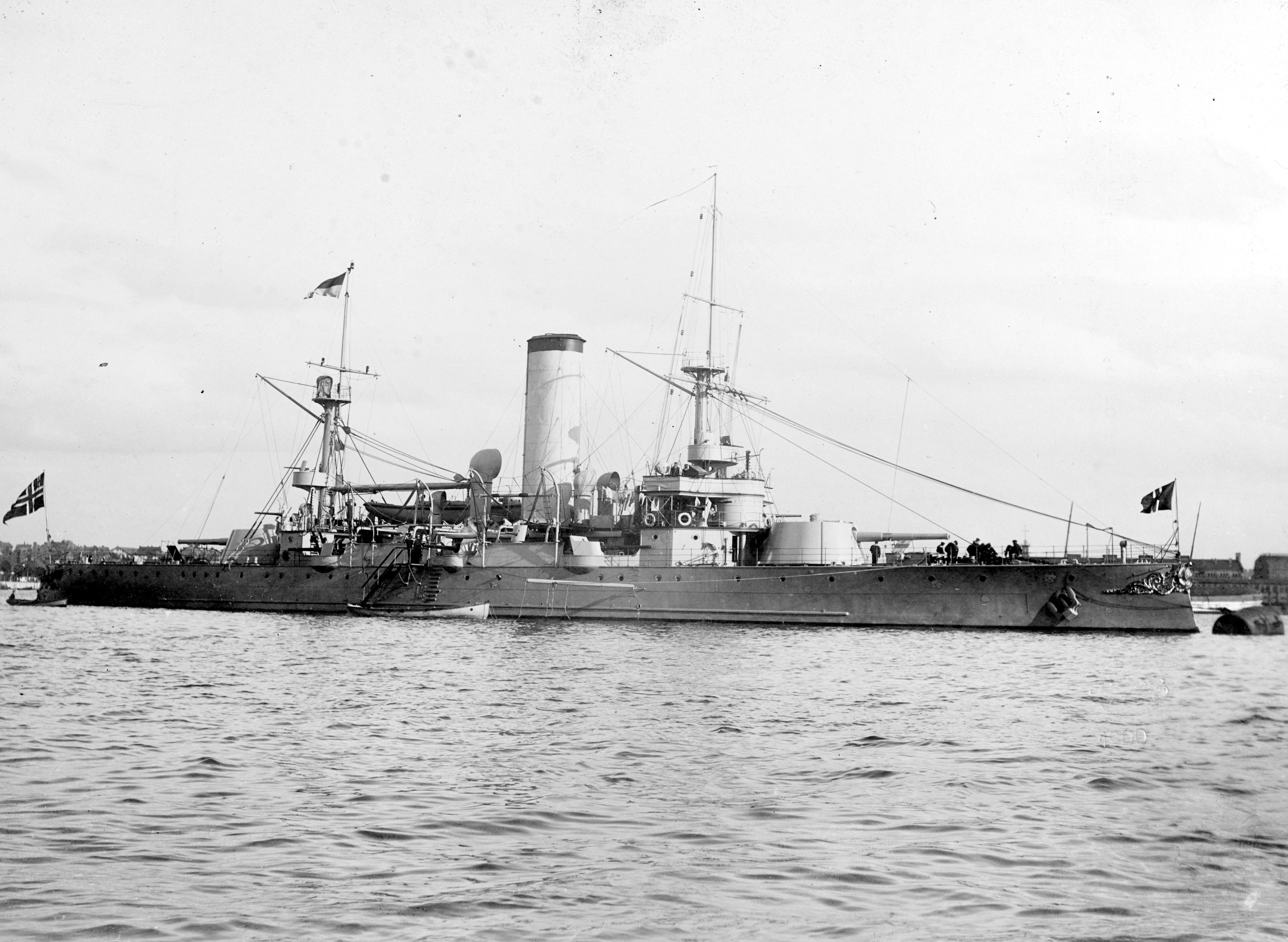
Photograph of
P/S Tordenskjold from 1900.

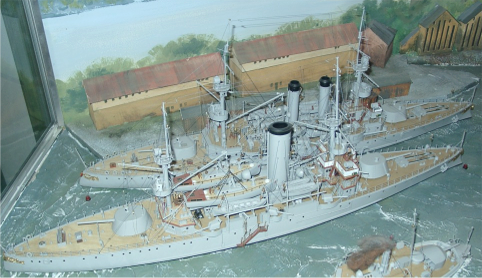
Models of the coastal defence cruisers Tordenskiold (front) and Eidsvold.

== Bibliography ==
- Brook, Peter. Warships for Export: Armstrong Warships 1867–1927. Gravesend, UK: World Ship Society, 1999. ISBN 0-905617-89-4.
- Chesneau, Roger and Eugene M. Kolesnik. Conway's All The World's Fighting Ships 1860–1905. London: Conway's Maritime Press, 1979. ISBN 0-85177-133-5.
- Dodson, Aidan & Nottlemann, Dirk (2023). "The German Flak Ships, Part I: The German and ex-Norwegian Hulls". In Jordan, John (ed.). Warship 2023. Oxford: Osprey Publishing. pp. 112–127. ISBN 978-1-4728-5713-2.
