= List of Royal Norwegian Navy ships =

This article is a list of Royal Norwegian Navy fleet units and vessels, both past and present.

Ships from the years 1509 to 1814 might be listed under Royal Dano-Norwegian Navy.

== Fleet units and vessels (present) ==
=== Frigates ===
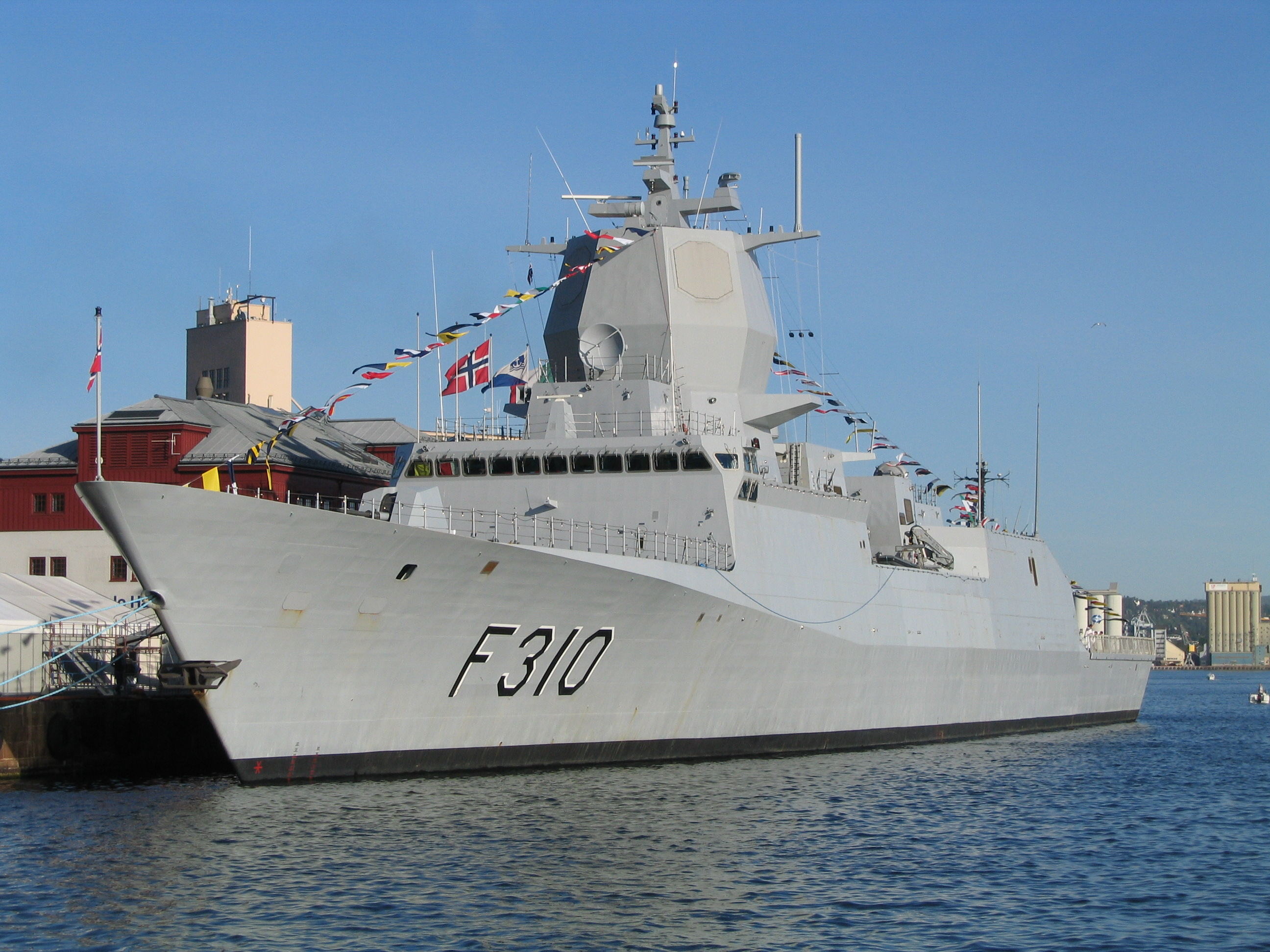
HNoMS Fridtjof Nansen

- Fridtjof Nansen class
  - Fridtjof Nansen (F310)
  - Roald Amundsen (F311)
  - Otto Sverdrup (F312)
  - Thor Heyerdahl (F314)

=== Support vessels ===
- Reinøysund (L4502) (former landing vessel)
- Rotsund (L4505) (former landing vessel)

=== Royal yacht ===
- Norge (A553) (formerly Philante, a private yacht of British ownership; escort vessel during WWII)
  - K/B Stjernen royal boat.

=== Minesweepers ===
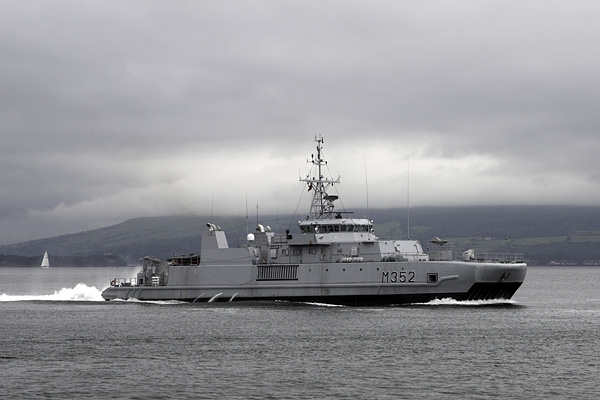
Alta-class minesweeper Rauma

- Oksøy-class mine hunter (1994)
  - Oksøy M340
  - Karmøy M341
  - Måløy M342
  - Hinnøy M343
- Alta-class minesweeper (1996)
  - Alta M350
  - Otra M351
  - Rauma M352
  - Orkla M353 (Ship sunk due to fire on 19 November 2002)
  - Glomma M354
- Mine Clearance Command (divers)

=== Submarine branch ===
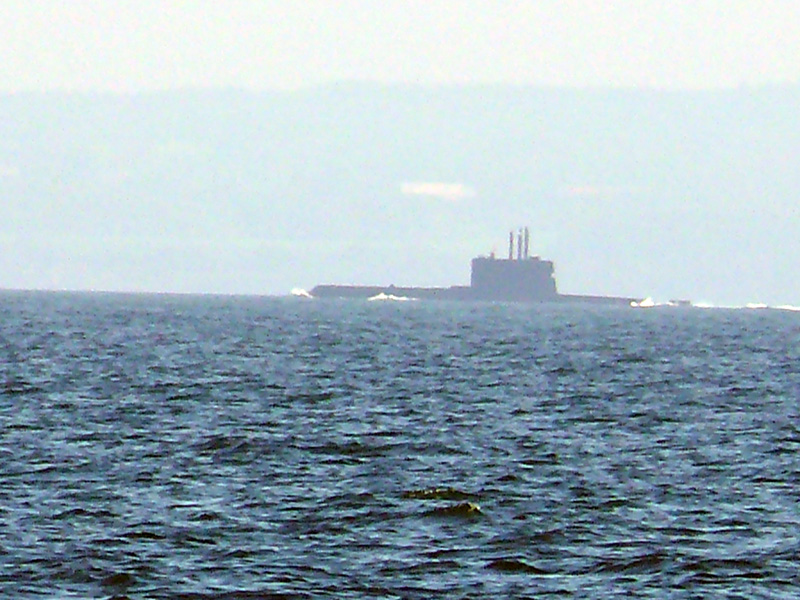
Ula class submarine

The submarine fleet consists of several Ula-class submarines.

- 1st Submarine Squadron (Diesel-electric Ula-class submarines):

- Ula
- Utsira
- Utstein
- Utvær
- Uthaug
- Uredd

=== MTB branch ===
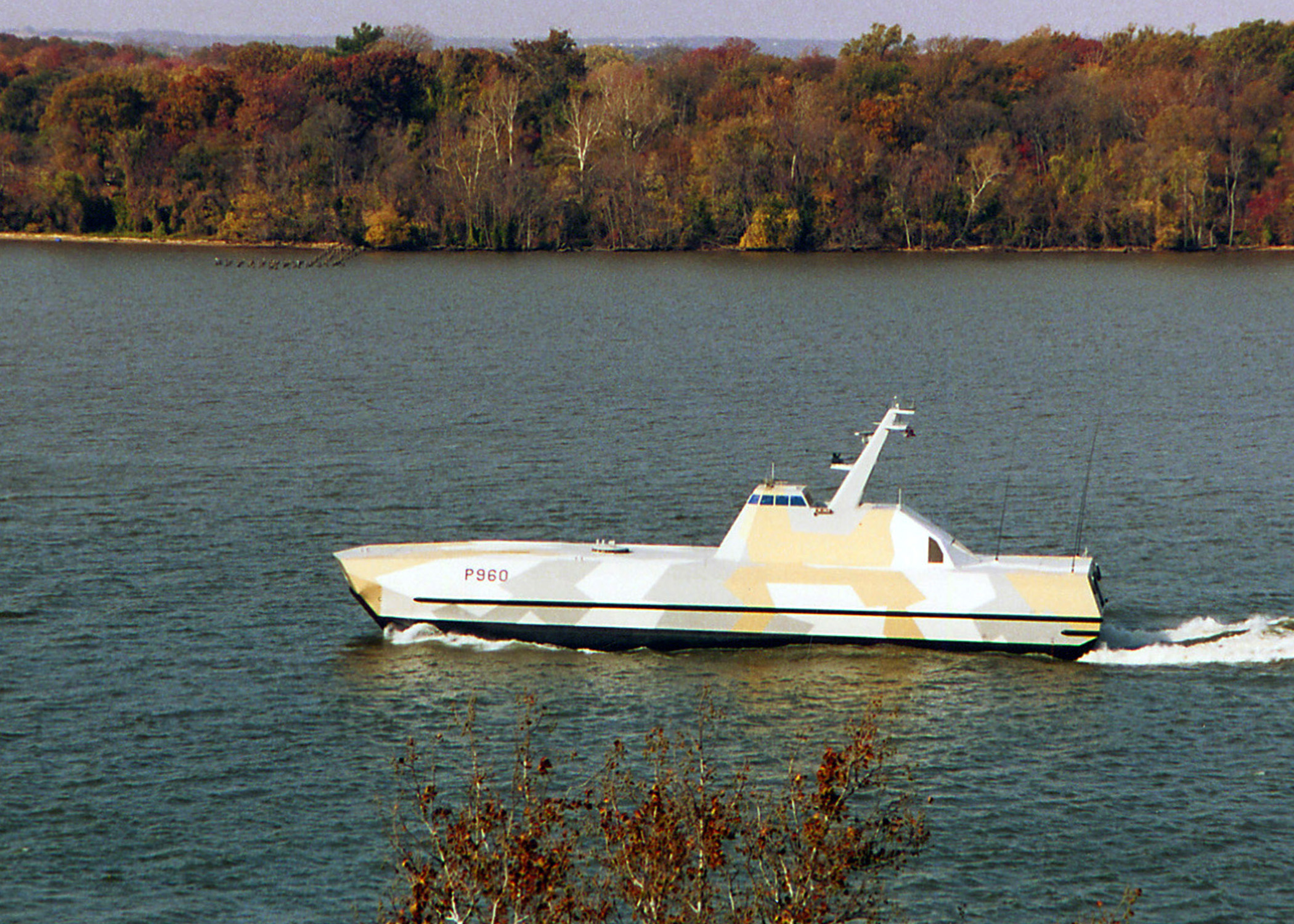
Skjold-class missile patrol boat HNoMS Skjold

The Coastal Warfare fleet consists of six Skjold-class missile patrol boats. The boat type is often branded a corvette.

- Missile Torpedo Boat Command
  - Missile Patrol Boat (Skjold class):
    - Skjold (P960)
    - Storm (P961)
    - Skudd (P962)
    - Steil (P963)
    - Glimt (P964)
    - Gnist (P965)
  - Support vessel:
    - Valkyrien (A535)

=== Naval Ranger branch ===
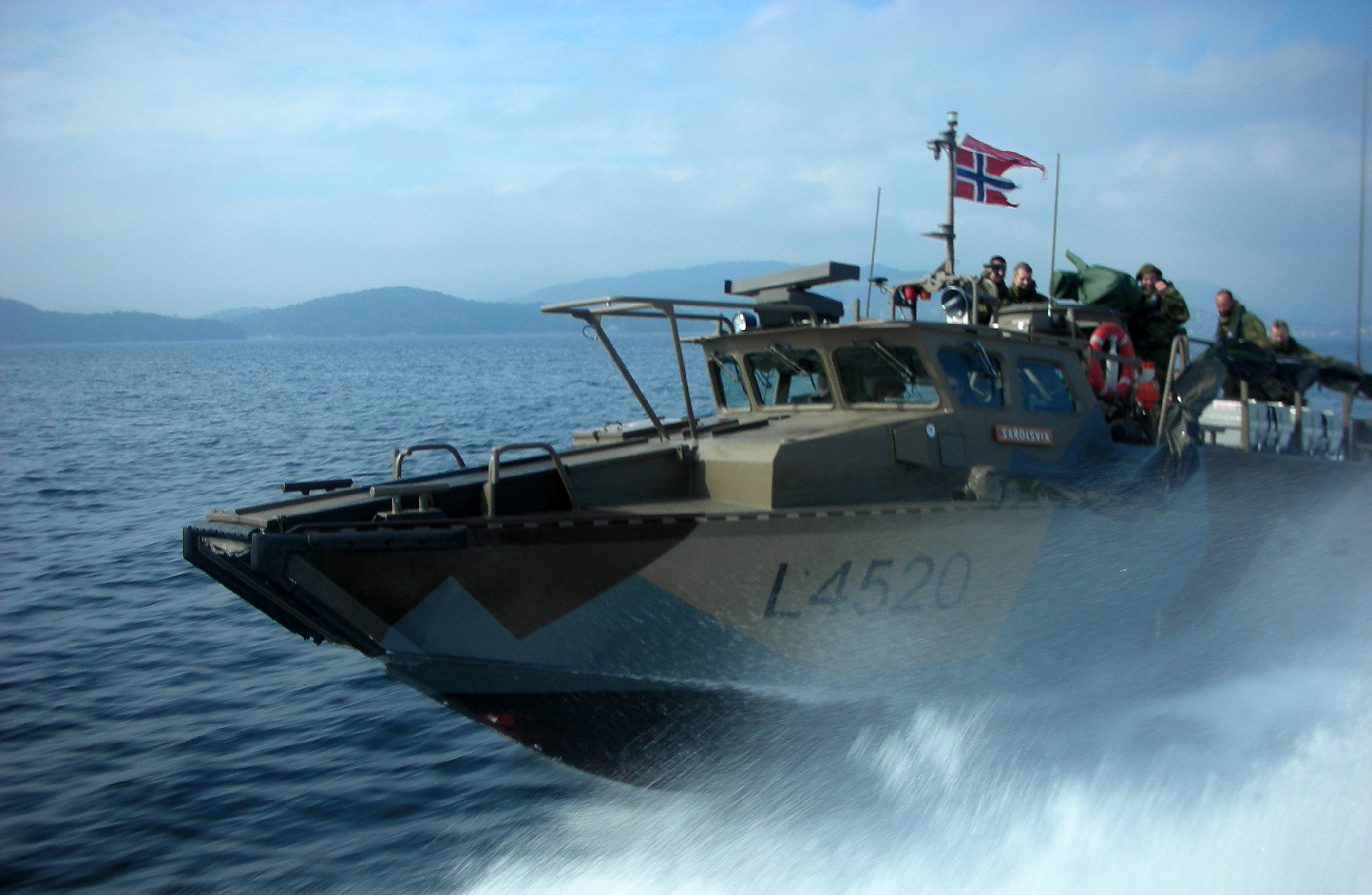
A Norwegian Combat Boat 90

- Norwegian Naval Special Operations Commando (Naval Ranger Command)
- Coastal Ranger Command
- Norwegian Mine Diver Command
- Tactical Boat Squadron
  - Combat Boat 90 (1996)
    - Trondenes
    - Skrolsvik
    - Kråkenes
    - Stangnes
    - Kjøkøy
    - Mørvika
    - Kopås
    - Tangen
    - Oddane
    - Malmøya
    - Hysnes
    - Brettingen
    - Løkhaug
    - Søviknes
    - Hellen
    - Osternes
    - Fjell
    - Lerøy
    - Torås
    - Møvik

=== Logistics branch ===
- HNoMS Maud

== Coast Guard units and vessels ==
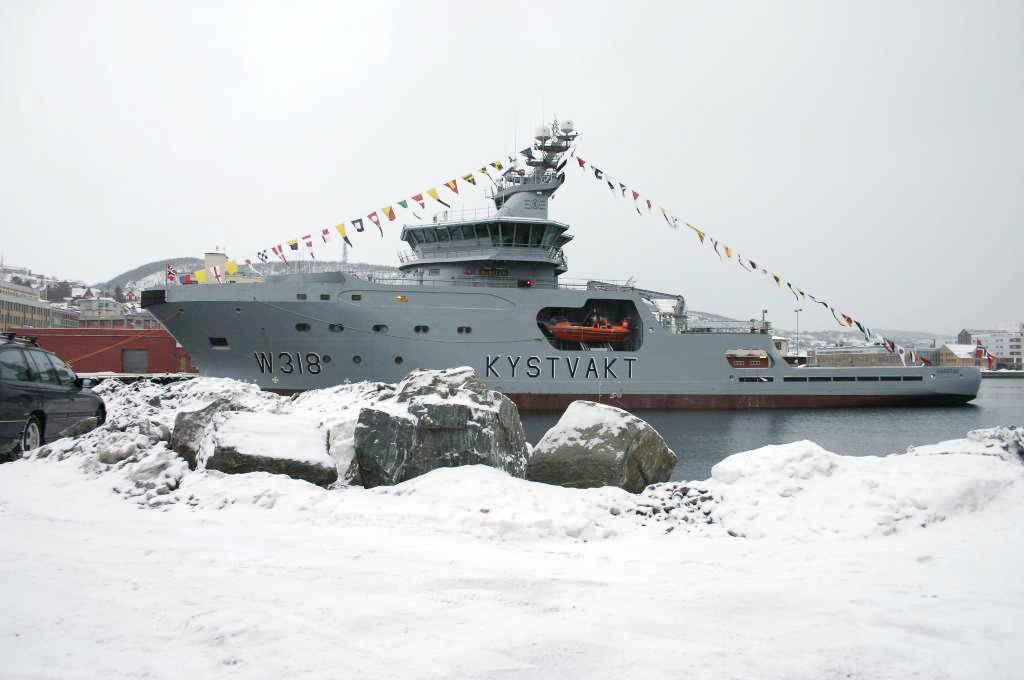
Coast Guard vessel Harstad in Harstad

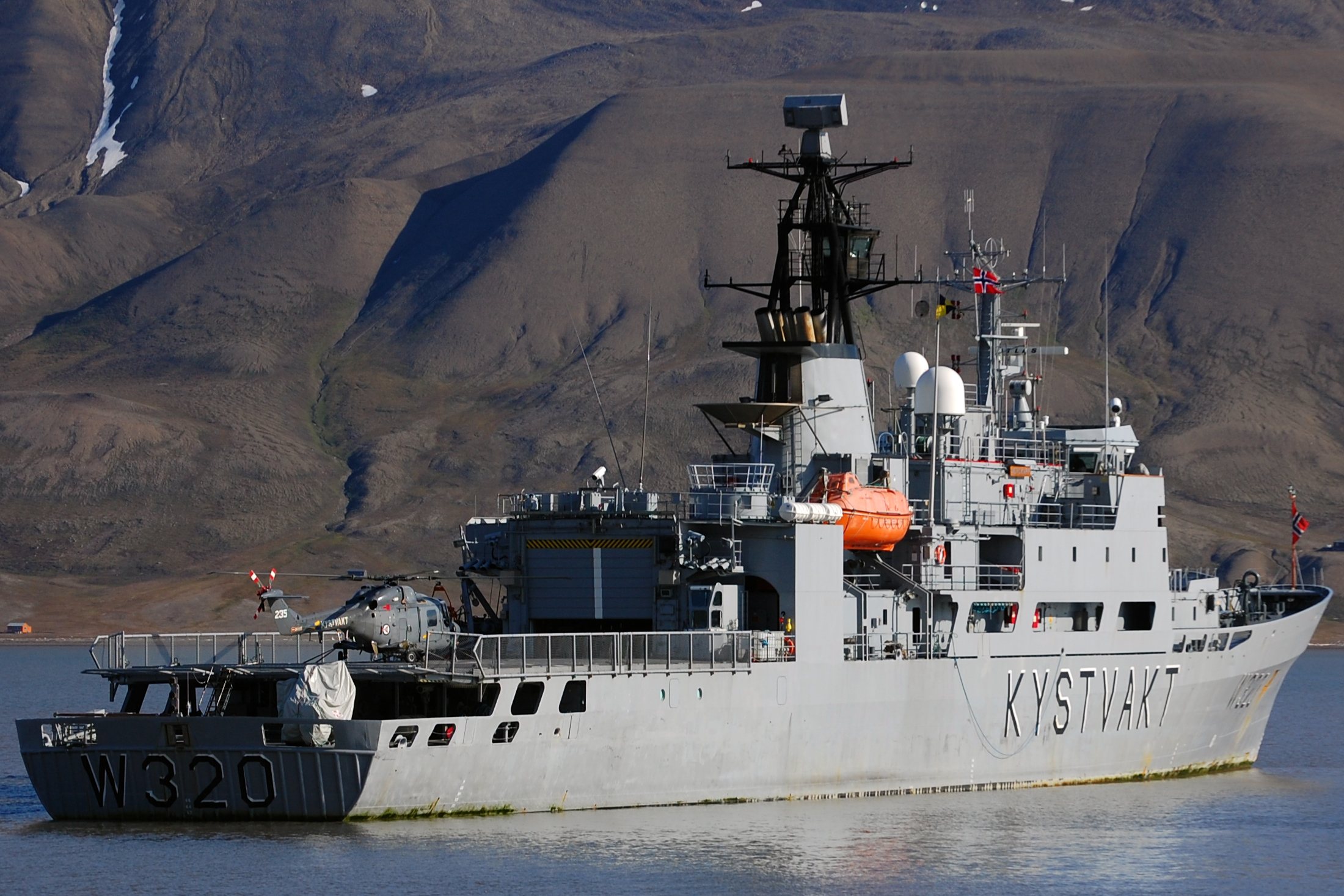
Coast Guard vessel NoCGV Nordkapp patrolling at Svalbard

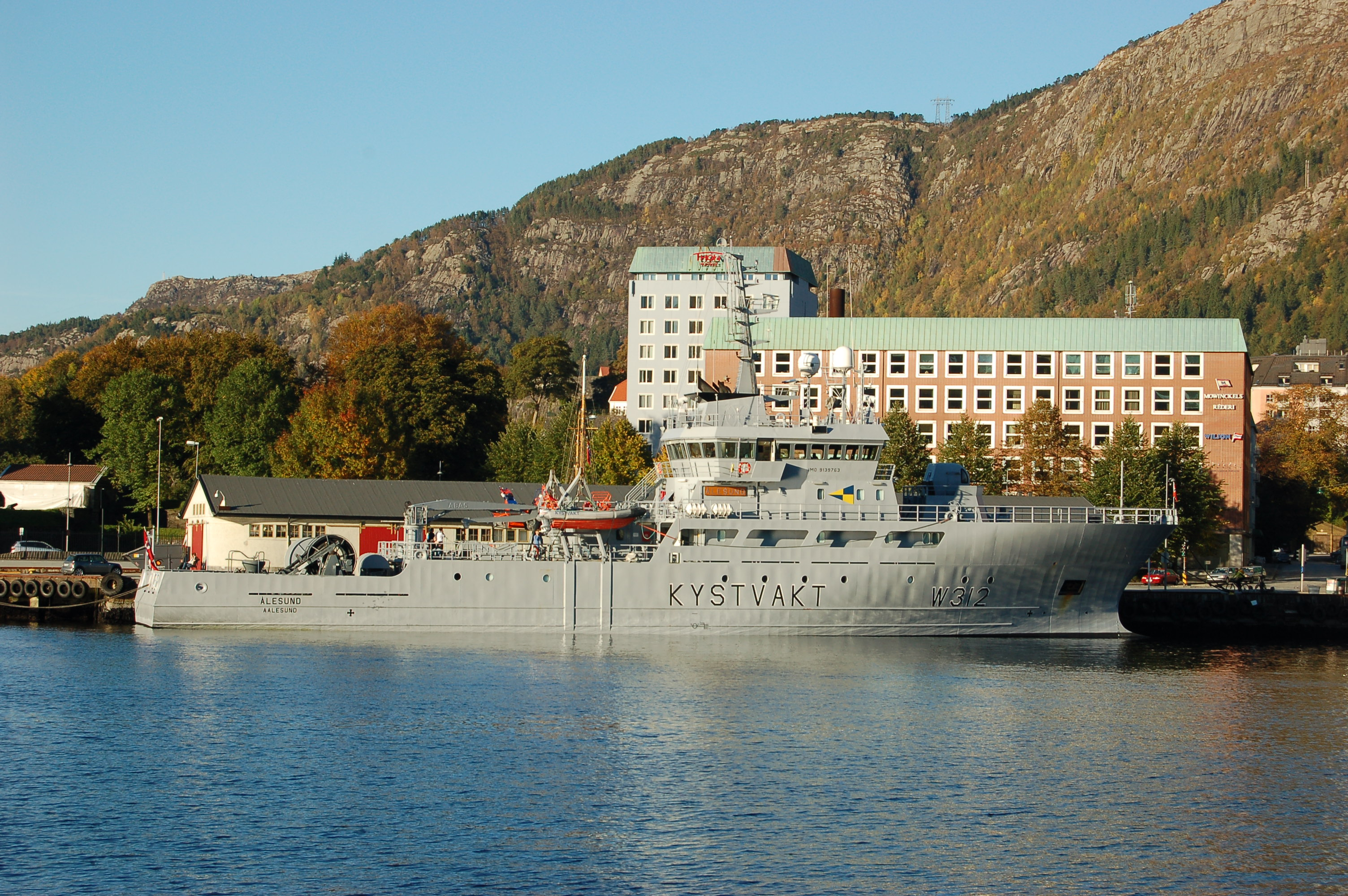
Coast Guard vessel Ålesund in Bergen

- Coast Guard Squadron North
  - Svalbard
  - Nordkapp class
    - Andenes
    - Nordkapp
    - Senja
  - Harstad
  - Chieftain
  - Thorsteinson
  - Sjøveien
  - Nysleppen
  - Barentshav
  - Torsteinson
  - Åhav
  - Kongsøy
  - Stålbas
- Coast Guard Squadron South
  - Ålesund
  - Eigun
  - Lafjord
  - Titran
  - Garsøy
  - Agder
  - Tromsø
- Future vessels
  - Six vessels of the Nornen class ordered
  - Three hybrid diesel-LNG vessels, two to be named Barentshav and Sortland and one unnamed ordered

== Naval schools ==
- Royal Norwegian Naval Basic Training Establishment, HNoMS Harald Haarfagre, Stavanger
- Royal Norwegian Navy Officer Candidate School, Horten
- Royal Norwegian Naval Academy, Laksevåg, Bergen
- Royal Norwegian Naval Training Establishment, HNoMS Tordenskjold, Haakonsvern, Bergen

== Navy vessels (past) ==
Several earlier ships are listed under Denmark.

=== Amphibious landing vessels ===
- Kvalsund class
  - Kvalsund (1968–1991)
  - Raftsund
- Reinøysund class
  - Reinøysund Still in use or in reserve?
  - Rotsund Still in use or in reserve?
  - Borgsund
  - Sørøysund (L4503) (Later rebuilt to Tjeldsund class)
  - Maursund (L4504) (Later rebuilt to Tjeldsund class)
- Tjeldsund class
  - Tjeldsund (L4506)

=== Armed auxiliaries ===
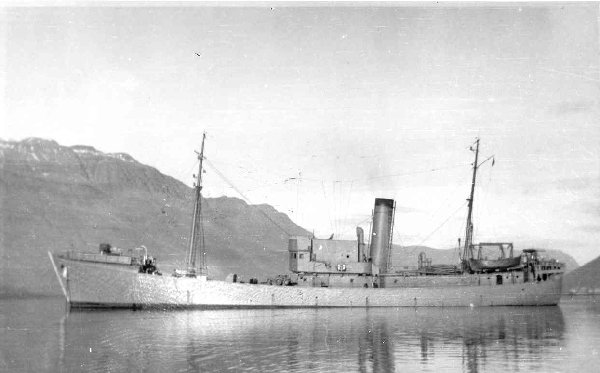
Naval trawler HNoMS Honningsvåg

- Alpha (1904–1940?) patrol boat
- Alversund (1926–1940) patrol boat, sunk by own crew.
- Andenes (?–1940?) patrol boat
- Aud I (?–1940?) patrol boat
- Bergholm used as MCM vessel and Shetland Bus.
- Beta (1900–1940?) patrol boat
- Bjerk (1912–?) patrol boat
- Blink (1896–1940?) patrol boat
- Blåsel patrol boat
- Bodø Sunk by a mine in 1943
- Commonwealth (1912–1940?) patrol boat
- Honningsvåg, naval trawler, originally the German trawler Malangen, captured by Norwegian forces at Honningsvåg 13 April 1940
- Pol III, armed whaler; engaged German Kampfgruppe 5 on 8 April 1940, its captain, Leif Welding-Olsen, became the first Norwegian uniformed casualty of WWII
- Thorodd, patrol boat

=== Brigs ===
- Allart (1807/1825–1825)
- Alsen (1808/1814–1837)
- Fredriksværn (1817–1854)
- Hemnæs (1814–1821)
- Kiel (1809/1814–1817)
- Langeland (1808/1814–1827)
- Lolland (1818–1847)
- Lougen (1805/1814–1882)
- Samsøe (1808/1814–1820)
- Seagull (1808/1814–1817) Launched 1805. Captured from the Royal Navy off Lindesnes 19 June 1808.
- Statsraad Erichsen (1859–1900)

=== Coastal defence ships ===
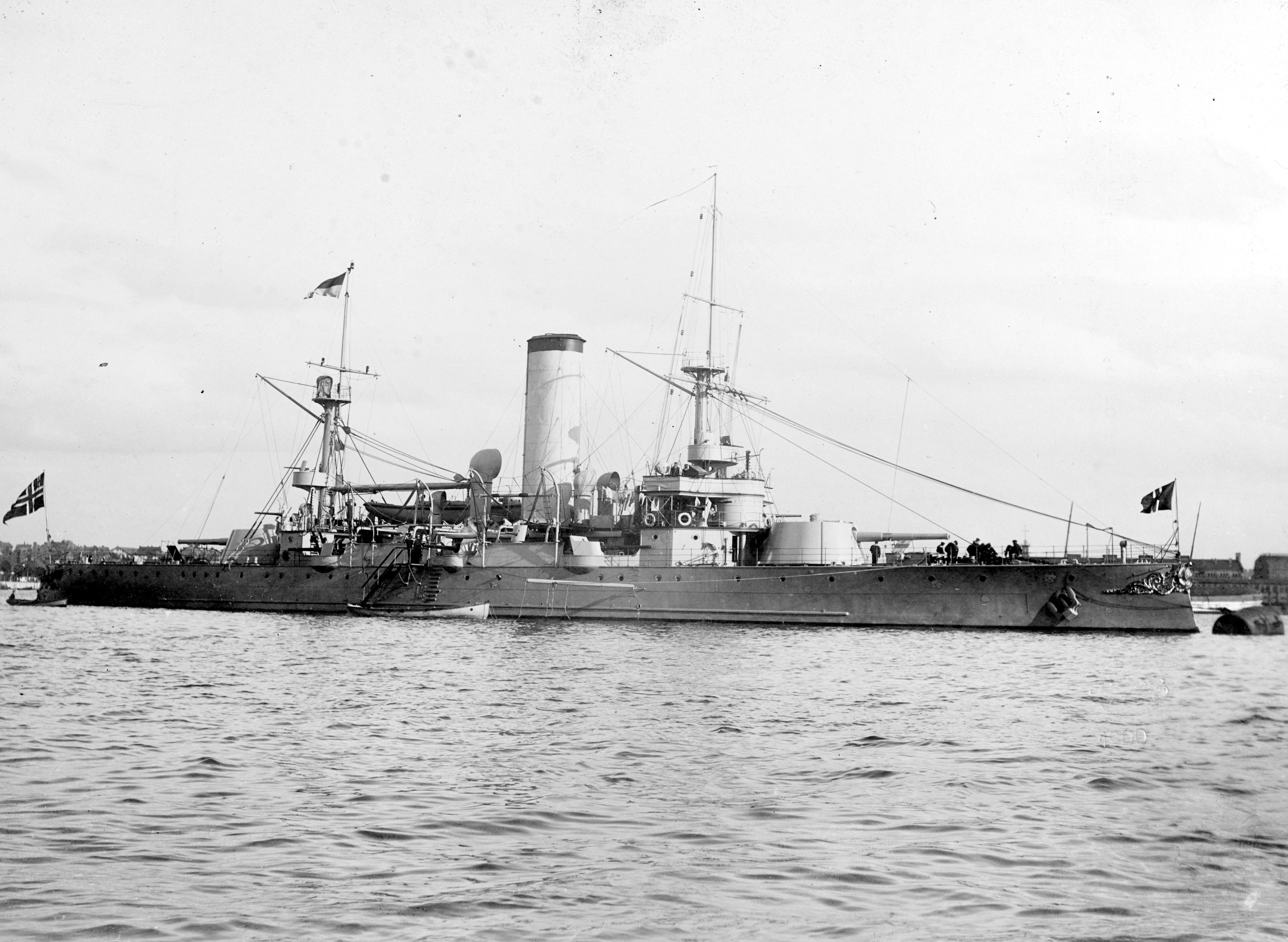
HNoMS Tordenskjold at Kiel in 1900

- Tordenskjold class
  - Tordenskjold (1897–1948)
  - Harald Haarfagre (1897–1948)
- Eidsvold class
  - Eidsvold (1901–1940) – Sunk at Narvik on 9 April 1940.
  - Norge (1900–1940) – Sunk at Narvik on 9 April 1940.
- Bjørgvin class
  - Bjørgvin (1912) – Seized by the Royal Navy and renamed HMS Glatton, blew up in September 1918.
  - Nidaros (1912) – Seized by the Royal Navy and renamed HMS Gorgon.

=== Corvettes ===
- Ellida (1849–1866)
- Ellida (1882–1925)
- Nordstjernen (1844–1858)
- Nordstjernen (1864–1940/1945)
- Nornen (1855–1903)
- Nidaros (1851–1903)
- Ørnen (1829–1874)
- Ørnen (1849–1866)
- Flower class – Six vessels received from the Royal Navy
  - Andenes – ex-HMS Acanthus
  - Nordkyn – ex-HMS Buttercup
  - Eglantine – ex-HMS Eglantine
  - Montbretia – ex-HMS Montbretia, sunk by U-262 on 18 November 1942.
  - Potentilla (1942–1944)- ex-HMS Potentilla
  - Rose – ex-HMS Rose
  - Polarfront II – ex-HMS Bryony, used as a weather ship.
- Castle class – One vessel received from the Royal Navy
  - Tunsberg Castle – ex-HMS Shrewsbury Castle, was sunk by a mine near Båtsfjord, Norway on 12 December 1944.
- Sleipner class – Two vessels built.
  - Sleipner (1965–1992)
  - Æger (1967–1992)

=== Destroyers ===
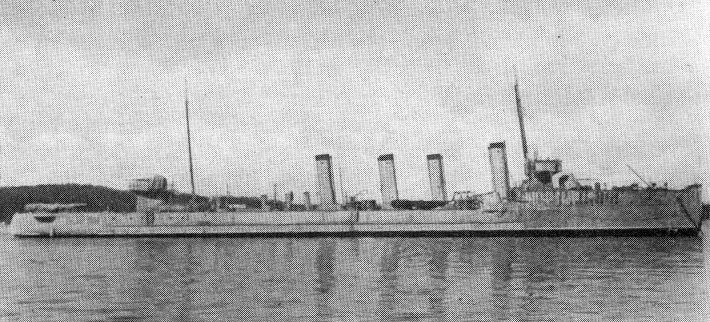
HNoMS Draug – lead ship of the Draug class

- Draug class
  - Draug (1910–1943) In Norwegian service until scrapped in 1944.
  - Troll (1912–1949) In German hands from 1940 to 1945, scrapped in 1949.
  - Garm (1914–1940) Sunk by Luftwaffe bombers on 26 April 1940 during the Norwegian campaign.

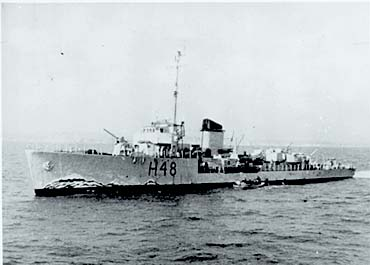
HNoMS Sleipner – lead ship of the Sleipner class

- Sleipner class Six vessels made in Norway from 1936 to 1939.
  - Sleipner (1936–1959) In Norwegian service during the war. Rebuilt to frigate in 1948.
  - Gyller (1938–1959) In German hands from 1940 to 1945. Rebuilt to frigate in 1948.
  - Æger (1936–1940) Sunk by German bombers on 9 April 1940, at the beginning of Operation Weserübung after first sinking the German supply ship Roda and shooting down two Luftwaffe bombers.
  - Odin (1939–1959) In German hands from 1940 to 1945. Rebuilt to frigate in 1948.
  - Balder (1946–1959) In German hands from 1940 to 1945. Rebuilt to frigate in 1948.
  - Tor (1946–1959) In German hands from 1940 to 1945. Rebuilt to frigate in 1948.
- S class Two vessels on loan from the Royal Navy
  - Svenner (1944) ex-HMS Shark Torpedoed and sunk on D-Day, 6 June 1944)
  - Stord (1943–1959) ex-HMS Success

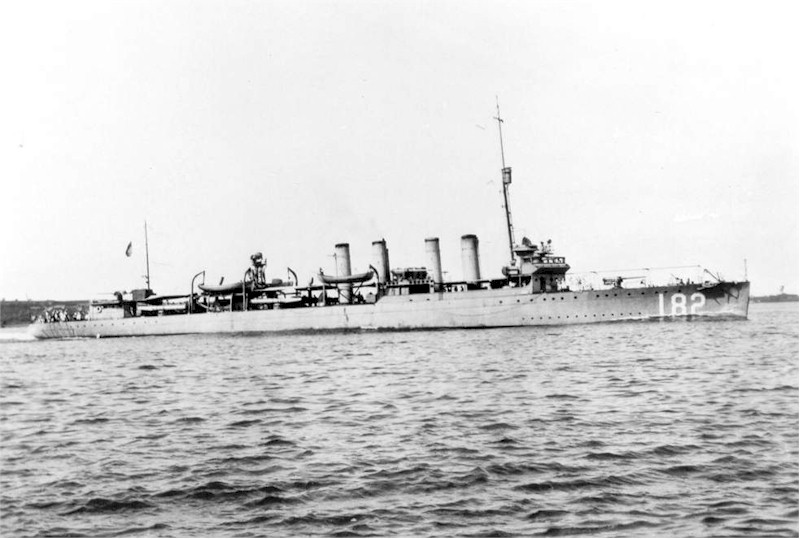
HNoMS St Albans at sea while named USS Thomas.

- Town class Five vessels on loan from the Royal Navy.
  - Lincoln (1942–1944)
  - St Albans (1941–1944)
  - Mansfield (1940–1942)
  - Bath (1941)
  - Newport (1941–1942)
- C class Four vessels bought from the UK in 1946 and 1947.
  - Oslo (1947–1965) ex-HMS Crown
  - Bergen ex-HMS Cromwell
  - Trondheim ex-HMS Croziers
  - Stavanger ex-HMS Crystal
- Type II Hunt class
  - Arendal ex-HMS Badsworth
  - Haugesund ex-HMS Beaufort
  - Tromsø ex-HMS Zetland
- Type III Hunt class
  - Glaisdale (1942–1961), Later renamed Narvik
  - Eskdale (1942–1943)

=== Frigates ===
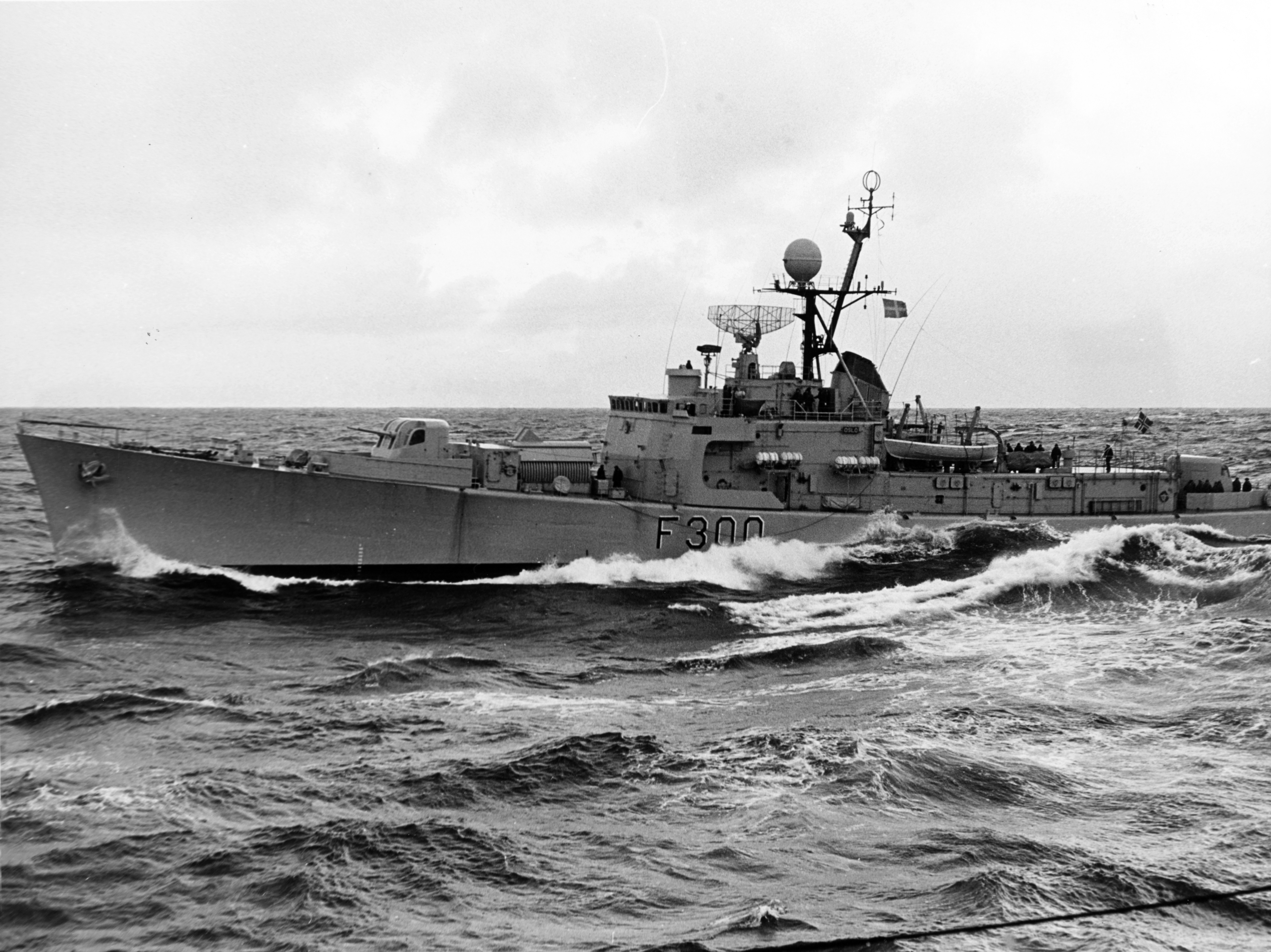
Oslo-class frigate Oslo in the North Atlantic, October 1971

- Freia (1828–1870)
- Desideria (1854–1920)
- St Olaf (1860–1925)
- Kong Sverre (1864–1932)
- Oslo class Five vessels built.
  - Oslo (1966–1994) Sank in 1994.
  - Bergen (1967–2005)
  - Trondheim (1966–2006), used as target during missile test 2013
  - Stavanger (1967–1998)
  - Narvik (1966–2007) transferred to the Royal Norwegian Navy Museum.
- River class Formerly of the Royal Canadian Navy
  - Draug (1956–1964) ex-HMCS Penetang
  - Garm (1956–1977) ex-HMCS Toronto, rebuilt in 1965 to serve as support vessel for torpedo boats under the name Valkyrien.
  - Troll (1956–1973) ex-HMCS Prestonian, rebuilt in 1965 to serve as support vessel for submarines under the name HNoMS Horten.

=== Cutters ===
- Built at Trondhjems Skibsverft, Trondheim
  - Capitaine Hans Peter Holm (1813/1814–1831)
  - General von Krogh (1813/1814–1831)
- Captured from Sweden
  - Gripen (1813/1814–1815)

=== Schooners ===
- Built at Georgernes Verft, Bergen
  - Thor (1805–1810)
  - Balder (1805–1810)
  - Odin (1808/1814–1839)
  - Valkyrjen (1808/1814–1839)
  - Nornen (1810/1814–1839)
  - Hother (1810/1814–1839)
  - Thor (1811/1814–1839)
  - Balder (1811/1814–1839)
- Built at Trondhjems Skibsverft, Trondheim
  - Patrioten Georg (1808/1814–?)
  - Trondhjem (1808/1814–?)
  - Borgersamfundet (1808/1814–?)
  - Axel Thorsen (1810/1814–1863)
  - Skjøn Valborg (1810/1814–1863)
- "Bombgun schooners"
  - Sleipner (1840–1866)
  - Vale (1843–1866)
  - Uller (1845–1877)
- Steam powered schooners
  - Gyller (1848–1905)
  - Gler (1850–1905)
  - Alfen (1859–1903) Rerigged and rebuilt as corvette in 1877.
- Paddlesteam schooners
  - Nordcap (1840–1870)
  - Æger (1852–1891)
  - Vidar (1855–1872)

=== Sloops ===
Sloops, several of which were later rebuilt as 3.-class gunboats.

- Arendal launched between 1840 and 1845. Rebuilt 1875.
- Augvaldsnæs launched between 1840 and 1845.
- Bergen launched between 1840 and 1845.
- Bodøe launched between 1840 and 1845.
- Bragernæs launched between 1840 and 1845.
- Brevig launched between 1840 and 1845. Rebuilt 1875, then used as a minelayer.
- Christiansund launched between 1840 and 1845.
- Drøbak launched between 1840 and 1845. Rebuilt 1872 to a catamaran steam gunboat and renamed Trold.
- Egersund launched between 1840 and 1845.
- Farsund launched between 1840 and 1845.
- Flekkefjord launched between 1840 and 1845.
- Fredrikshald launched between 1840 and 1845.
- Hammerfest launched between 1840 and 1845.
- Holmestrand launched between 1840 and 1845.
- Horten launched between 1840 and 1845. Rebuilt 1875 and used as a minelayer.
- Høievarde launched between 1840 and 1845.
- Kaholmen launched between 1840 and 1845.
- Karmøe launched between 1840 and 1845. Rebuilt 1883 and used as a minelayer.
- Kongsberg launched between 1840 and 1845. Rebuilt 1875. Stricken 1905.
- Kristiansand aka. Christiansand launched between 1840 and 1845. Rebuilt 1875 and used as a minelayer.
- Langesund launched between 1840 and 1845. Rebuilt 1875. Stricken 1905.
- Larvik aka. Laurvig launched between 1840 and 1845. Rebuilt 1875.
- Levanger launched between 1840 and 1845.
- Lillesand launched between 1840 and 1845. Rebuilt 1875 and used as a minelayer.
- Lindesnæs launched between 1840 and 1845.
- Molde launched between 1840 and 1845.
- Moss launched between 1840 and 1845.
- Munkholmen launched between 1840 and 1845.
- Namsos launched between 1840 and 1845.
- Porsgrund launched between 1840 and 1845. Rebuilt 1875. Stricken 1905.
- Sarpsborg launched between 1840 and 1845. Rebuilt 1872 as a catamaran steam gunboat and renamed Trold. Stricken 1905.
- Skeen launched between 1840 and 1845. Rebuilt 1875. Stricken 1905.
- Skudenæs launched between 1840 and 1845. Rebuilt 1883. Stricken 1905.
- Soon launched between 1840 and 1845.
- Stat launched between 1840 and 1845.
- Strømsøe launched between 1840 and 1845. Rebuilt 1872 as a catamaran steam gunboat and renamed Nøk. Stricken 1903.
- Svelvigen launched between 1840 and 1845. Rebuilt 1872 as a steam gunboat and renamed Dverg. Stricken 1905.
- Sverresborg launched between 1840 and 1845.
- Tananger launched between 1840 and 1845.
- Tangen launched between 1840 and 1845.
- Tromsøe launched between 1840 and 1845.
- Trondhjem launched between 1840 and 1845.
- Tønsberg launched between 1840 and 1845. Rebuilt 1875. Stricken 1905.
- Udsire launched between 1840 and 1845.
- Vardøe launched between 1840 and 1845.
- Vardøhuus launched between 1840 and 1845.
- Aalesund launched between 1840 and 1845.
- Aaasgaardstrand launched between 1840 and 1845. Rebuilt 1875 and used as a minelayer.

=== Gunboats ===
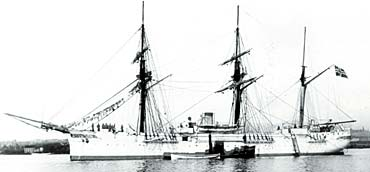
1.-class gunboat HNoMS Ellida

- 1. class
  - Ellida (1882–1925)
  - Sleipner (1878–1935)
  - Viking (1892–1924)
  - Frithjof (1895–1929)

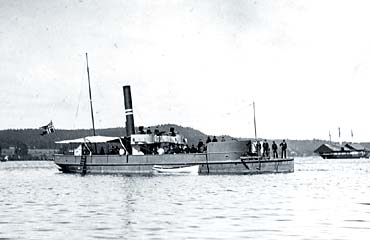
2.-class gunboat of the Vale series

- 2. class
  - Vale class
    - Vale (1874–1947) Rebuilt to minelayer in 1911.
    - Brage (1878–1946) Rebuilt to minelayer in 1912.
    - Nor (1878–1949) Rebuilt to minelayer in 1912.
    - Uller (1876–1940) Rebuilt to minelayer in 1911.
    - Vidar (1882–1947) Rebuilt to minelayer in 1911.
  - Gor class
    - Gor (1884–1945) Rebuilt to minelayer in 1913.
    - Tyr (1887–1945) Rebuilt to minelayer in 1913.
  - Æger (1894–1932)

=== Steam powered gunboats ===
- Rjukan (1861–1893)
- Sarpen (1861–1940)
- Lougen (1864–1903)
- Glommen (1864–1903)

=== Submarine chasers ===
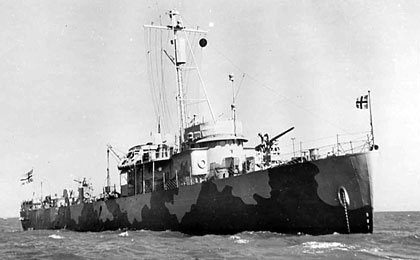
Submarine chaser HNoMS King Haakon VII

- Hessa (P358)
- Hitra (museum vessel)
- Vigra (P359)
- King Haakon VII (1942–1951) Former US submarine chaser HNoMS King Haakon VIIUSS ''PC-467''.

=== Submarines ===
- Kobben (1909–1933) Renamed A-1 on 21 February 1913. The tower of Kobben is preserved at the Royal Navy Officers' Training School at Horten.
- A class Three vessels were bought in 1913, a fourth was ordered in 1914 (A-5) but was confiscated by the Imperial German Navy at the outbreak of World War I.
  - A-2 (1914–1940)
  - A-3 (1914–1940)
  - A-4 (1914–1940)
  - A-5 Confiscated by Germany, named UA in 1914 and never entered Norwegian service.

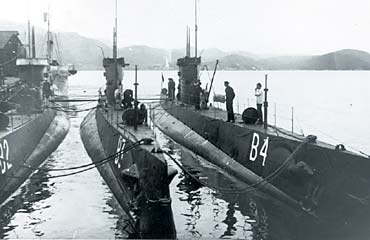
B class submarines B-2, B-3 and B-4

- B class Six vessels of the US Holland type built on licence in Norway from 1922 to 1929.
  - B-1 (1923–1947) Escaped to the Faeroe Islands 8 June 1940, later used as a training vessel in Scotland.
  - B-2 (1924–1940) Captured by the Germans on 11 April.
  - B-3 (1926–1940) Scuttled by own crew on 10 April to prevent German capture.
  - B-4 (1927–1940) Captured by the Germans on 10 April.
  - B-5 (1929–1940) Captured by the Germans on 11 April and renamed UC-1.
  - B-6 (1930–1940) Surrendered to German troops on 18 April under threat of bombing of Florø city. Named UC −2 in German service.
- U class
  - Uredd ex. HMS P41, (1941–1943)
  - Ula ex. HMS Varne, (1943–1965), Given to Norway by the UK in 1943
- V class
  - Utstein, ex. HMS Venturer, sold to Norway in 1946.
  - Uthaug, ex. HMS Votary, sold to Norway in 1946.
  - Utvær, ex. HMS Viking, sold to Norway in 1946.
  - Utsira, ex. HMS Variance
- K class
  - Kya, ex-U-926
  - Kaura, ex-U-995
  - Kinn, ex-U-1202
- Kobben class Fifteen vessels built from 1964 to 1967.
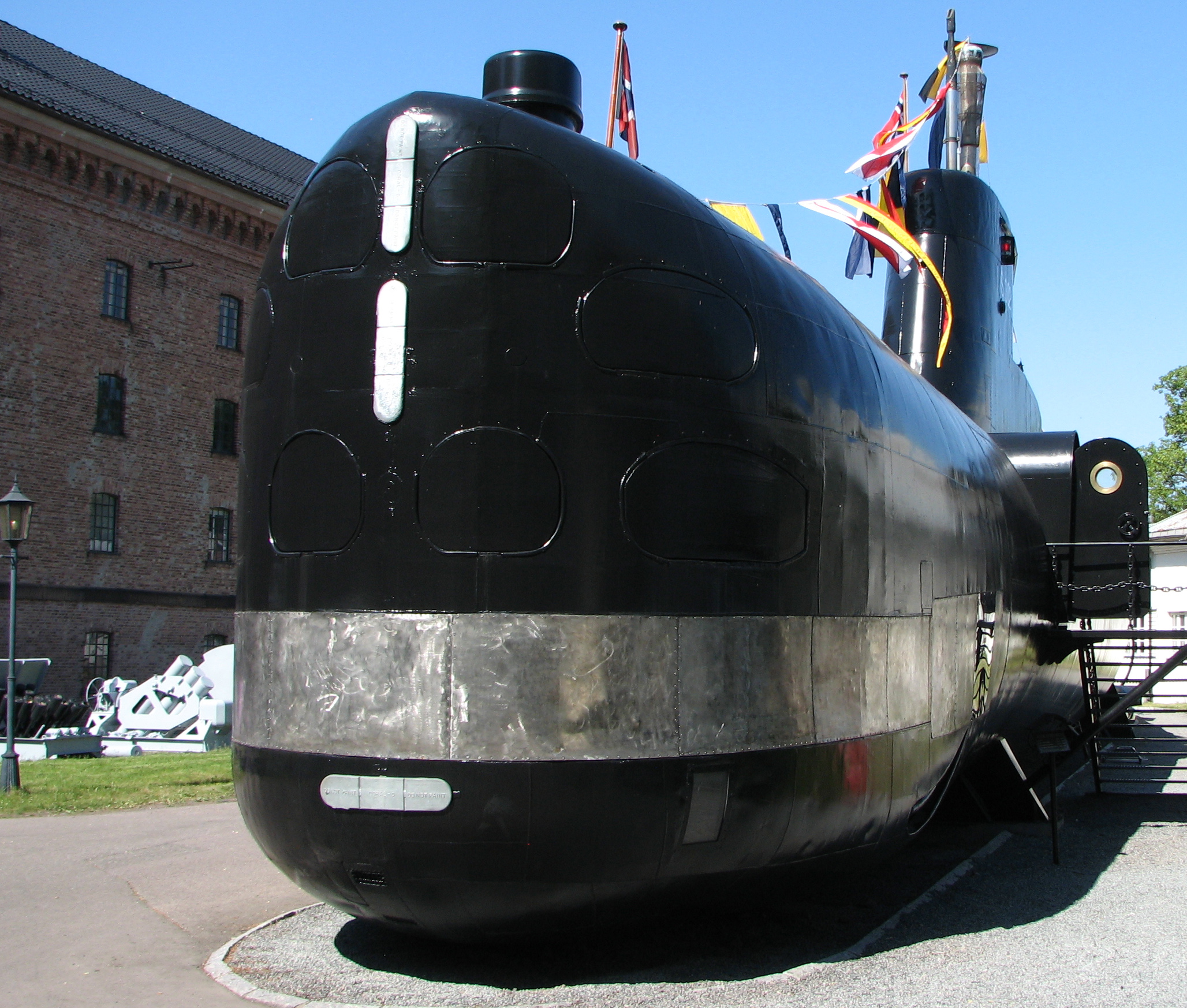
  HNoMS Utstein, a Kobben class submarine
  - Kinn (1964–1982) Deliberately sunk in Bjørnefjorden in 1990.
  - Kya (1964–1991) Transferred to the Royal Danish Navy as HDMS Springeren in 1991.
  - Kobben (1964–2001) Transferred to the Polish Navy as ORP Jastrząb to be used for parts.
  - Kunna (1964–?) Transferred to Poland as ORP Kondor in 2004.
  - Kaura (1965–?) Transferred to Denmark to be used for parts in 1991.
  - Ula (1965–1998) Changed name to Kinn in 1987. Scrapped in 1998.
  - Utsira (1965–1998) Scrapped 1998.
  - Utstein (1965–1998) Transferred to the Royal Norwegian Navy Museum in 1998.
  - Utvær (1965–1989) Transferred to Denmark as HDMS Tumleren in 1989.
  - Uthaug (1966–1990) Transferred to Denmark as HDMS Sælen in 1990.
  - Sklinna (1966–2001) Scrapped in 2001.
  - Skolpen (1966–2002) Transferred to Poland as ORP Sęp in 2002.
  - Stadt (1966–1990) Scrapped.
  - Stord (1967–2002) Transferred to Poland as ORP Sokół in 2002.
  - Svenner (1967–2003) Also a training ship. To Poland as ORP Bielik in 2003.
- Ula class Six vessels were delivered from Germany in 1989-1992 and still active.
  - Ula (S300) (since 1988)
  - Utsira (S301) (since 1992)
  - Utstein (S302) (since 1991)
  - Utvær (S303) (since 1990)
  - Uthaug (S304) (since 1991)
  - Uredd (S305) (since 1990)

=== Minesweepers ===
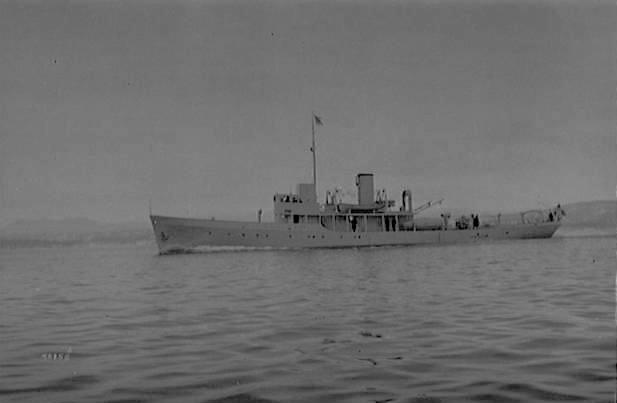
HNoMS Otra – the RNoN's first purpose built minesweeper

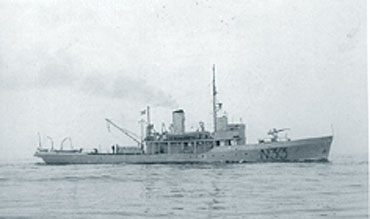
HNoMS Rauma – the RNoN's second purpose-built minesweeper

- Børtind (1912–?) Refitted guard vessel
- Otra First purpose built Norwegian minesweeper
- Rauma Second purpose built Norwegian minesweeper
- NYMS class
  - NYMS 247/Vinstra (M 317)
  - NYMS 306/Gaula (M 318)
  - NYMS 377/Driva (M 319)
  - NYMS 379/Alta (M 320)
  - NYMS 380/Vorma (M 321)
  - NYMS 381/Begna (M 322)
  - NYMS 382
  - NYMS 406/Rana (M 330)
- Sauda class
  - Kvina
  - Ogna
  - Sauda
  - Sira
  - Tana
  - Tista
  - Utla
  - Vosso
  - Glomma
  - Alta (museum vessel)
- Syrian
- Nordhav II
- Drøbak
- Tyr (N50), discovered wreck of German submarine U-735 in 1999 and wreck of British Royal Navy destroyer HMS Hunter in 2008. Commissioned in the Royal Norwegian Navy 1995-2014.

=== Minelayers ===
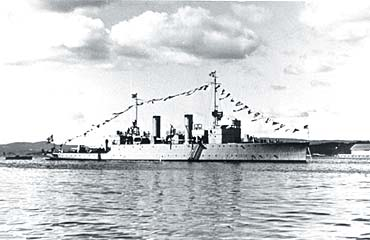
Royal Norwegian Navy minelayer Frøya

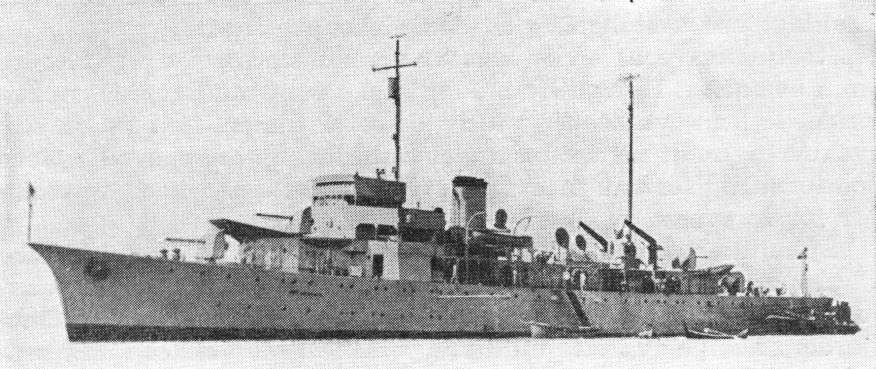
Royal Norwegian Navy minelayer Olav Tryggvason

- Glommen class
  - Glommen (1916–1950)
  - Laugen (1918–1950)
- Frøya (1918–1940)
- Olav Tryggvason (1934–1940)
- Gor class Formerly US Navy Auk class.
  - Brage (N49)
  - Gor (N48)
  - Uller (N50)
  - Tyr (N47)
- Vidar class Two vessels built in Norway.
  - Vidar (N52) (1977–2006) Sold to the Lithuanian Naval Force in 2006.
  - Vale (N53) (1978–2003) Given to the Latvian Navy in 2003.

=== Monitors ===
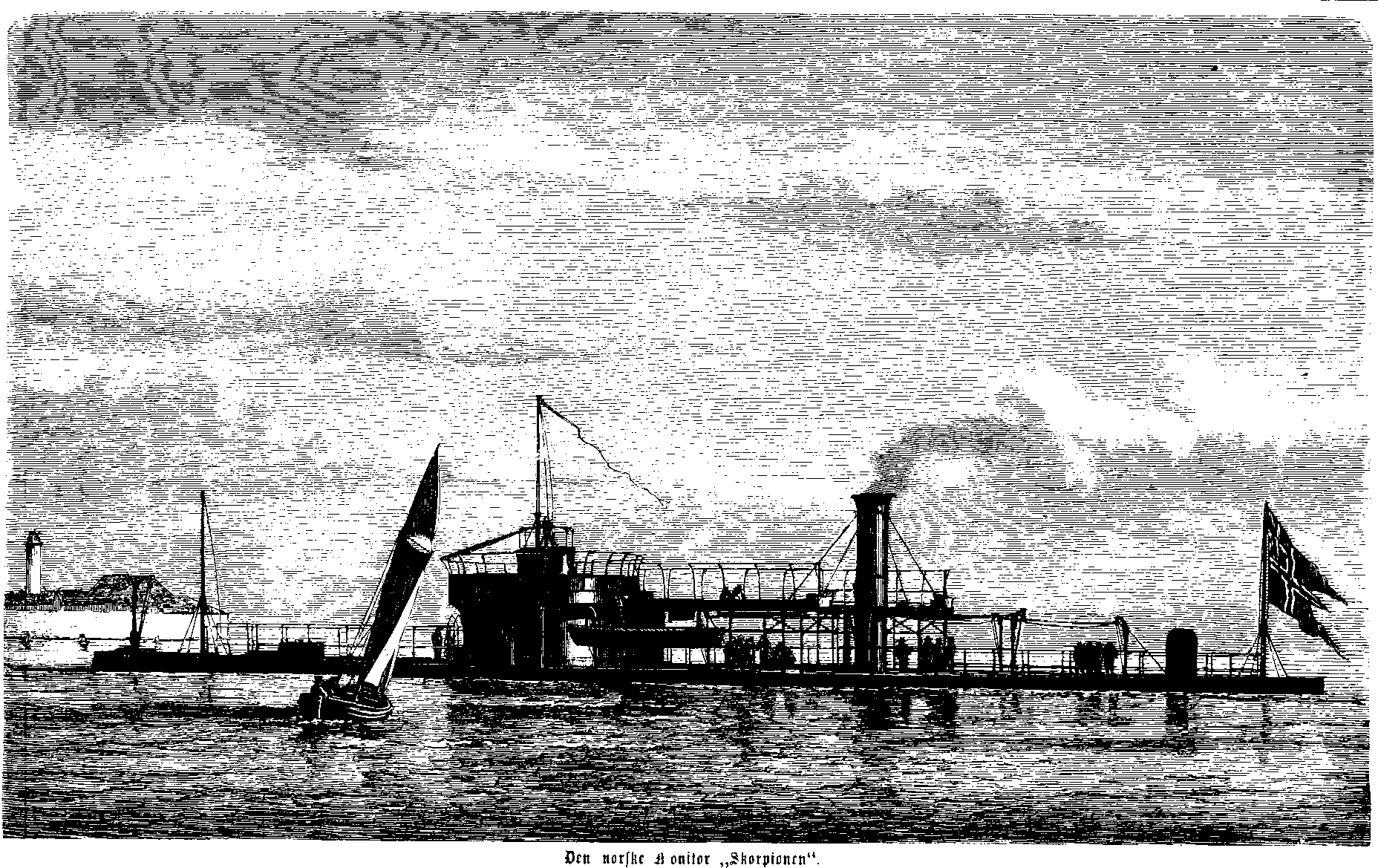
The Norwegian monitor Skorpionen

- Skorpionen class:
  - Skorpionen (1867–1908)
  - Mjølner (1869–1908)
  - Thrudvang (1870–1918)
- Thor (1876–1918)

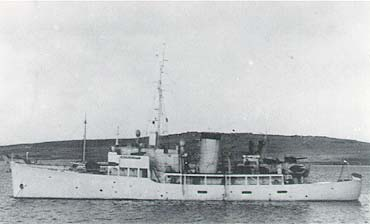
HNoMS Nordkapp

=== Offshore patrol vessels ===
- Heimdal (1892–1946)
- Fridtjof Nansen (1930–1940)
- Nordkapp (1937–1954)

=== Torpedo boats ===
- Rap (1873–1920) – the first modern torpedo boat.
- Ulven (1878–1923)

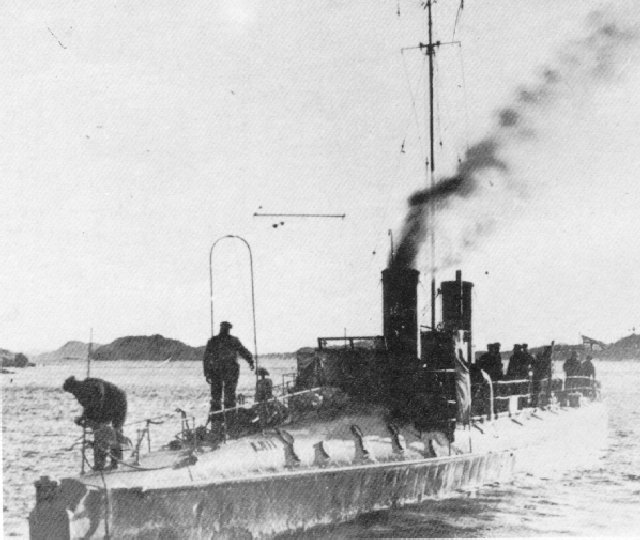
2. class torpedo boat HNoMS Kjell.

- 2. class – 27 built from 1882.
  - Lyn
  - Rask (1885–?)
  - Pil (1886–?)
  - Snar (1887–?)
  - Orm (1888–?)
  - Kjell (1912–1940) Captured by the Germans and used as a patrol boat under the name KT1, later rebuilt as a minesweeper under the name NK.02 Dragoner, sunk 28 September 1944 by British aircraft.

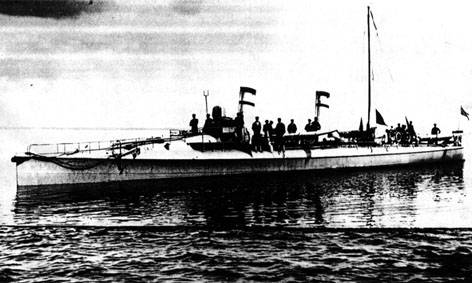
1. class torpedo boat HNoMS Sæl.

- 1. class Ten vessels built from 1892.
- 3. class One small harbour and fjord torpedo boat built in 1899.
  - Myg (1899–?)
  - Oter (1888–?)
  - Raket (1894–?)
  - Varg (1894–?)
  - Glimt (1897–?)
  - Djerv (1897–1940) Refitted as minesweeper. Sunk by own crew in Sognefjorden.
  - Storm (1898–1940)
  - Brand (1898–1946)
  - Trods (1898–?)
  - Dristig (1899–1940) Refitted as minesweeper. Sunk by own crew in Sognefjorden.
  - Laks (1900–?)
  - Sild (1900–?)
  - Sæl (1901–1940)
  - Skrei (1901–?)
  - Hauk (1902–?)
  - Falk (1902–?)
  - Ørn (1903–?)
  - Ravn (1903–?)
  - Grib (1905–?)
  - Jo (1905–?)
  - Lom (1905–?)
  - Skarv (1906–?)
  - Teist (1907–?)
- Trygg class Three 256 ton vessels built between 1919 and 1921
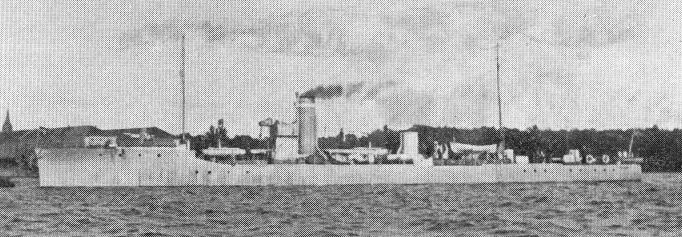
  Trygg class torpedo boat HNoMS Snøgg
  - Trygg (1919–1940) Sunk, then salvaged by the Germans in 1940.
  - Snøgg (1920–1940) Captured by the Germans in 1940.
  - Stegg (1921–1940) Sunk in battle in 1940.
- MTB 5 (1940)
- MTB 6 (1940–1941)
- MTB 56 (1941–1942)
- MTB 345 (1943) Captured by the Germans 28 July 1943, lost in fire the next month
- Fairmile D class aka D class. Ten vessels were in Norwegian service at the end of WWII. Seven of them were used until 1959.
- Elco class Ten vessels received from the US Navy as part of a weapons aid program in 1951.
  - Snøgg ex US Navy PT-602
  - Sel ex US Navy PT-603
  - Sild ex US Navy PT-604
  - Skrei ex US Navy PT-605
  - Snar ex US Navy PT-606
  - Springer ex US Navy PT-608
  - Hai ex US Navy PT-609
  - Hauk ex US Navy PT-610
  - Hval ex US Navy PT-611
  - Hvass ex US Navy PT-612
- Tjeld class aka. Nasty class 20 vessels built in Norway from 1959 to 1966.
  - Tjeld (1959–1992) Renamed Sel. Transferred to Naval Reserve and used by Sea Home Guard. Sold for scrapping 1992.
  - Skarv (1959–1981) Sold to Stapletask Ltd, Sittingbourne, Kent, England.
  - Teist (1960–1981) Sold to Stapletask Ltd, Sittingbourne, Kent, England.
  - Jo (1960–1981) Sold to Stapletask Ltd, Sittingbourne, Kent, England.
  - Lom (1961–1981) Sold to Stapletask Ltd, Sittingbourne, Kent, England.
  - Stegg (1961–1992) Renamed Hval. Transferred to Naval Reserve and used by Naval Home Guard. Sold for scrapping 1992.
  - Hauk (1961–1992) Renamed Laks. Transferred to Naval Reserve and used by Sea Home Guard. Sold for scrapping 1992.
  - Falk (1961–1981) Sold to Stapletask Ltd, Sittingbourne, Kent, England.
  - Ravn (1961–1992) Renamed Knurr. Transferred to Naval Reserve and used by Sea Home Guard. Sold for scrapping 1992.
  - Gribb (1961–?) Renamed Delfin. Transferred to Naval Reserve and used by Sea Home Guard. Was planned to be preserved by Kværner Mandal A/S, but later sold for scrapping.
  - Geir (1962–1981) Sold to Stapletask Ltd, Sittingbourne, Kent, England.
  - Erle (1962–1981) Sold to Stapletask Ltd, Sittingbourne, Kent, England.
  - Sel (1963–1981) Sold to Stapletask Ltd, Sittingbourne, Kent, England.
  - Hval (1964–1981) Sold to Stapletask Ltd, Sittingbourne, Kent, England.
  - Laks (1964–1981) Sold to Stapletask Ltd, Sittingbourne, Kent, England.
  - Hai (1964–?) Transferred to Naval Reserve and used by Sea Home Guard. Plans are currently underway for Hai to be preserved as a museum ship in Fredrikstad.
  - Knurr (1964–1981) Sold to Stapletask Ltd, Sittingbourne, Kent, England.
    - Lyr (1965–1992) Transferred to Naval Reserve and used by Sea Home Guard. Sold for scrapping 1992.
  - Skrei (1965–?) Transferred to Naval Reserve and used by Sea Home Guard. Transferred to the Royan Norwegian Navy Museum and preserved as a museum ship.
  - Delfin (1966–1984) Given to Friends of the Shetland bus as a preservation project, but the project failed and the ship was given to a private person.
- Rapp class Six vessels built in Norway from 1952 to 1956.
  - Rapp
  - Rask (?–1970)
- Storm class 20 vessels built from 1965 to 1967.
  - Arg
  - Blink
  - Brann
  - Brask
  - Brott
  - Djerv
  - Glimt
  - Gnist
  - Hvass
  - Kjekk
  - Odd
  - Pil
  - Rokk
  - Skjold
  - Skudd
  - Steil
  - Storm
  - Traust
  - Tross
  - Trygg
- Snøgg class Six vessels built from 1970 to 1971.
  - Kjapp
  - Kvikk (1970–1994)
  - Rapp
  - Snøgg (1970–1994)
  - Rask
  - Snar
- Hauk class
  - Hauk (P986)
  - Ørn (P987)
  - Terne (P988)
  - Teist (P991)
  - Tjeld (P989)
  - Lom (P993)
  - Stegg (P994)
  - Ravn (P996)
  - Geir (P998)
  - Skarv (P990)
  - Jo (P992)
  - Falk (P995)
  - Gribb (P997)
  - Erle (P999)

=== Training vessels, school ships ===
- Christian Radich
- Haakon VII (A537) (1958–1973) ex-USS Gardiners Bay (AVP-39). School ship. Built as a seaplane tender for the United States Navy.
- Sørlandet

=== Other ships ===
- Brabant
- Ormen Lange longship (Long Serpent)

== Sources ==
- (in Norwegian)Vold, Ottar; Felttoget 1940 – avdelingenes påkjenninger og tap; 1995; ISBN 82-551-0413-5
- Axel Thorsen, a Norwegian gunboat of 1810 High resolution photos of a model
