= List of ship launches in 1966 =

The list of ship launches in 1966 includes a chronological list of all ships launched in 1966.

Date	Ship	Class	Builder	Location	Country	Notes
6 January	Talbot	Brooke-class frigate	Bath Iron Works	Bath, Maine	United States	For United States Navy
10 January	Lady Brigid	Offshore supply vessel	J. Bolson & Son Ltd.	Poole	United Kingdom	For P&O Offshore Services Ltd.
21 January	Sklinna	Kobben-class submarine	Nordseewerke	Emden	West Germany	For Royal Norwegian Navy
25 January	Orcoma	Tanker	Harland & Wolff	Belfast	United Kingdom	For Shell International Marine
26 January	Kronprins Carl Gustav	Ferry	Nobiskrug	Rendsburg	West Germany	For A/B Bonnierföretagen,
31 January	Lady Claudine	Offshore supply vessel	Brooke Marine Ltd.	Lowestoft	United Kingdom	For P&O Offshore Services Ltd.
4 February	Stavanger	Oslo-class frigate	Karljohansvern	Horten	Norway	For Royal Norwegian Navy
5 February	Sir Winston Churchill	Sail training ship	Richard Dunston Ltd	Hessle	United Kingdom	For Sail Training Association
8 February	Argonaut	Leander-class frigate	Hawthorn Leslie and Company	Hebburn	United Kingdom	For Royal Navy
10 February	Hopper Barge No. 7	Hopper barge	Blyth Dry Docks & Shipbuilding Co. Ltd	Blyth	United Kingdom	For Calcutta Port Commission.
11 February	Corella	Research vessel	Brooke Marine Ltd.	Lowestoft	United Kingdom	For Ministry of Agriculture, Fisheries and Food.
12 February	Juneau	Austin-class amphibious transport dock	Lockheed Shipbuilding	Seattle, Washington	United States	For United States Navy
25 February	Queenfish	Sturgeon-class submarine	Newport News Shipbuilding	Newport News, Virginia	United States	For United States Navy
25 February	Westerwald	Westerwald-class transport ship	Lübeck	Orenstein & Koppel	West Germany	For German Navy
26 February	Sturgeon	Sturgeon-class submarine	Electric Boat	Groton, Connecticut	United States	For United States Navy
1 March	Texelstroom		Scheepswerf & Machinefabriek P. Smit Jr.	Rotterdam	Netherlands	For Texels Eigen Stoomboot Onderneming
3 March	Svea	Ferry	Lindholmens Varv	Gothenburg	Sweden	for Rederi AB Svea
7 March	Atlanta	Cargo ship	Brooke Marine Ltd.	Lowestoft	United Kingdom	For Atlanta Navigation Co. Ltd.
9 March	Regent	Tanker	Harland & Wolff	Belfast	United Kingdom	For Royal Fleet Auxiliary.
24 March	Skolpen	Kobben-class submarine	Nordseewerke	Emden	West Germany	For Royal Norwegian Navy
26 March	Niagara Falls	Mars-class combat stores ship	National Steel & Shipbuilding	San Diego, California	United States	For United States Navy
31 March	Goldeneye	Wild Duck-class boom defence vessel	Brooke Marine Ltd.	Lowestoft	United Kingdom	For Royal Navy.
1 April	Lyness	Combat stores ship	Swan Hunter	Wallsend	United Kingdom	For Royal Fleet Auxiliary
4 April	Pen Avon	Dredger	Appledore Shipbuilders Ltd.	Appledore	United Kingdom	For Seaborne Aggregate Co. Ltd.
4 April	Richard L. Page	Brooke-class frigate	Bath Iron Works	Bath, Maine	United States	For United States Navy
7 April	Nordfriesland	Ferry	Husumer Schiffswerft GmbH	Husum	West Germany	For Wyker Dampfschiffs-Reederei Amrum GmbH
15 April	Freiburg	Lüneburg-class replenishment ship	Flensburger Schiffbau-Gesellschaft mbH & Co. KG	Flensburg	West Germany	For German Navy
26 April	Lady Delia	Offshore supply vessel	Brooke Marine Ltd.	Lowestoft	United Kingdom	For P&O Offshore Services Ltd.
2 May	Elkhound	Dog-class tug	Appledore Shipbuilders Ltd.	Appledore	United Kingdom	For Royal Maritime Auxiliary Service.
3 May	Glücksburg	Lüneburg-class replenishment ship	Flensburger Schiffbau-Gesellschaft mbH & Co. KG	Flensburg	West Germany	For German Navy
5 May	Brisbane	Perth-class destroyer	Defoe Shipbuilding Company	Bay City, Michigan	United States	For Royal Australian Navy
5 May	Odenwald	Westerwald-class transport ship	Orenstein & Koppel	Lübeck	West Germany	For German Navy
6 May	Nairnbank	Cargo ship	Harland & Wolff	Belfast	United Kingdom	For Bank Line.
7 May	Cleveland	Austin-class amphibious transport dock	Ingalls Shipbuilding	Pascagoula, Mississippi	United States	For United States Navy
14 May	Samuel Gompers	Samuel Gompers-class destroyer tender	Puget Sound Naval Shipyard	Bremerton, Washington	United States	For United States Navy
21 May	Haddock	Permit-class submarine	Ingalls Shipbuilding	Pascagoula, Mississippi	United States	For United States Navy
25 May	Winston Churchill	Ferry	Cantieri Navali del Tirreno e Riuniti S.P.A.	Genoa	Italy	for DFDS Seaways
31 May	W.D. Hoyle	Hopper barge	Blyth Dry Docks & Shipbuilding Co. Ltd	Blyth	United Kingdom	For Westminster Dredging Co. Ltd.
May	Baden	Coastal trading vessel	Trondhjems Mekaniske Verksted	Trondheim	Norway	For Fred Losen & Co.
10 June	Stadt	Kobben-class submarine	Nordseewerke	Emden	West Germany	For Royal Norwegian Navy
21 June	Maraval	Tug	Appledore Shipbuilders Ltd.	Appledore	United Kingdom	For Dockyard Investments Ltd.
22 June	Deerhound	Dog-class tug	Appledore Shipbuilders Ltd.	Appledore	United Kingdom	For Royal Maritime Auxiliary Service.
22 June	Ray	Sturgeon-class submarine	Newport News Shipbuilding	Newport News, Virginia	United States	For United States Navy
23 June	Lady Fiona	Offshore supply vessel	Brooke Marine Ltd.	Lowestoft	United Kingdom	For P&O Offshore Services Ltd.
1 July	Coronado	Austin-class amphibious transport dock	Lockheed Shipbuilding	Seattle, Washington	United States	For United States Navy
5 July	Donax	Tanker	Harland & Wolff	Belfast	United Kingdom	For Shell International Marine.
9 July	Ammersee	Walchensee-class tanker	Lindenau	Kiel	West Germany	For German Navy
15 July	U-2	Type 205 submarine	HDW	Kiel	West Germany	For German Navy
19 July	Labrador	Dog-class tug	Appledore Shipbuilders Ltd.	Appledore	United Kingdom	For Royal Maritime Auxiliary Service.
21 July	Will Rogers	Benjamin Franklin-class submarine	Electric Boat	Groton, Connecticut	United States	For United States Navy
22 July	Julius A. Furer	Brooke-class frigate	Bath Iron Works	Bath, Maine	United States	For United States Navy
26 July	White Plains	Mars-class combat stores ship	National Steel & Shipbuilding	San Diego, California	United States	For United States Navy
6 August	Dubuque	Austin-class amphibious transport dock	Ingalls Shipbuilding	Pascagoula, Mississippi	United States	For United States Navy
19 August	Najaden	Ferry	Aarhus Flydedok	Aarhus	Denmark	For Danske Statsbaner.
1 September	Herekino	Tug	Brooke Marine Ltd.	Lowestoft	United Kingdom	For Northland Harbour Board.
2 September	Stord	Kobben-class submarine	Nordseewerke	Emden	West Germany	For Royal Norwegian Navy
12 September	Waitangi	Tug	Brooke Marine Ltd.	Lowestoft	United Kingdom	For Northland Harbour Board.
15 September	Resolution	Resolution-class submarine	Vickers Armstrong		United Kingdom	For Royal Navy
16 September	Puget Sound	Samuel Gompers-class destroyer tender	Puget Sound Naval Shipyard	Bremerton, Washington	United States	For United States Navy
16 September	Stromness	Combat stores ship	Swan Hunter	Wallsend	United Kingdom	For Royal Fleet Auxiliary
17 September	Pargo	Sturgeon-class submarine	Electric Boat	Groton, Connecticut	United States	For United States Navy
22 September	W.D. Hilbre	Hopper barge	Blyth Dry Docks & Shipbuilding Co. Ltd	Blyth	United Kingdom	For Westminster Dredging Co. Ltd.
29 September	Patricia	Ferry	Lindholmens Varv	Gothenburg	Sweden	for Swedish Lloyd
7 October	Stalwart	Destroyer tender	Cockatoo Island Dockyard	Sydney, New South Wales	Australia	For Royal Australian Navy
13 October	Ulster Prince	Ferry	Harland & Wolff	Belfast	United Kingdom	For Coast Lines.
14 October	Sunfish	Sturgeon-class submarine	General Dynamics Quincy Shipbuilding	Quincy, Massachusetts	United States	For United States Navy
14 October	Whale	Sturgeon-class submarine	General Dynamics Quincy Shipbuilding	Quincy, Massachusetts	United States	For United States Navy
17 October	T.P.1	Barge	Appledore Shipbuilders Ltd.	Appledore	United Kingdom	For United Africa Co. Ltd.
17 October	T.P.2	Barge	Appledore Shipbuilders Ltd.	Appledore	United Kingdom	For United Africa Co. Ltd.
20 October	U-9	Type 205 submarine	HDW	Kiel	West Germany	For German Navy
22 October	Shreveport	Austin-class amphibious transport dock	Lockheed Shipbuilding	Seattle, Washington	United States	For United States Navy
22 October	Tegernsee	Walchensee-class tanker	Lindenau	Kiel	West Germany	For German Navy
October	Albacora	Daphné-class submarine	Dubigeon	Nantes	France	For Portuguese Navy
10 November	Lundy Puffin	Fishing trawler	Appledore Shipbuilders Ltd.	Appledore	United Kingdom	For Appledore Shipbuilders Ltd.
12 November	Tor Hollandia	Ferry	Lübecker Flender-Werke	Lübeck	West Germany	For Tor Line
14 November	Lady Thelma	Firefighting tug	Appledore Shipbuilders Ltd.	Appledore	United Kingdom	For J. H. Pigott & Son Ltd.
19 November	Knox	Knox-class frigate	Todd Pacific Shipyards	Seattle, Washington	United States	For United States Navy
23 November	Zurmand	Tug	Appledore Shipbuilders Ltd.	Appledore	United Kingdom	For BP Clyde Tanker Co. Ltd.
24 November	Rogate	Coaster	Blyth Dry Docks & Shipbuilding Co. Ltd.	Blyth	United Kingdom	For Stephenson, Clarke Ltd.
25 November	Asagumo	Yamagumo-class destroyer	Hitachi Zosen Corporation	Maizuru, Japan	Japan	For Japanese Navy
25 November	Algocape	Lake freighter	Davie Shipbuilding	Lauzon, Quebec	Canada	For Canada Steamship Lines
29 November	Otway	Oberon-class submarine	Scotts Shipbuilding and Engineering Company	Greenock	United Kingdom	For Royal Australian Navy
30 November	Marlin	Fishing trawler	Brooke Marine Ltd.	Lowestoft	United Kingdom	For Amalgamated Fisheries Co. Pty. Ltd.
12 December	Mastiff	Dog-class tug	Appledore Shipbuilders Ltd.	Appledore	United Kingdom	For Royal Maritime Auxiliary Service.
30 November	Redfin	Fishing trawler	Brooke Marine Ltd.	Lowestoft	United Kingdom	For Amalgamated Fisheries Co. Pty. Ltd.
16 December	Lapon	Sturgeon-class submarine	Newport News Shipbuilding	Newport News, Virginia	United States	For United States Navy
17 December	Concord	Mars-class combat stores ship	National Steel & Shipbuilding	San Diego, California	United States	For United States Navy
19 December	G.W.111	Barge	Appledore Shipbuilders Ltd.	Appledore	United Kingdom	For George Wimpey Ltd.
29 December	Shota Rustaveli	Ivan Franko-class passenger ship	V.E.B. Mathias-Thesen Werft	Wismar	East Germany	For Black Sea Shipping Company
Date unknown	Alice L. Moran	Tug			United States	For Moran Group.
Date unknown	Bantry Puffin	Fishing trawler	Appledore Shipbuilders Ltd.	Appledore	United Kingdom	For Appledore Shipbuilders Ltd.
Date unknown	Beechcroft	Tanker	Appledore Shipbuilders Ltd.	Appledore	United Kingdom	For Bowker & King Ltd.
Date unknown	LCM 710	Landing craft	J. Bolson & Son Ltd.	Poole	United Kingdom	For Royal Navy.
Date unknown	LCM 711	Landing craft	J. Bolson & Son Ltd.	Poole	United Kingdom	For Royal Navy.
Date unknown	Lundy Puffin	Tug	Appledore Shipbuilders Ltd.	Appledore	United Kingdom	For Appledore Shipbuilders Ltd.
Date unknown	Zaeedah	Barge	Appledore Shipbuilders Ltd.	Appledore	United Kingdom	For Abu Dhabi Marine Areas Ltd.
