= HNoMS Ellida =

HNoMS Ellida may refer to one of the following Royal Norwegian Navy ships:

- HNoMS Ellida (1849), a Norwegian sailing corvette commissioned in 1849 and sold off in 1866
- HNoMS Ellida (1880), a 1st class gunboat launched in 1880, and rebuilt as a steam-powered corvette in 1896; sold off in 1925
- HNoMS Ellida (A534), the former American tank landing ship USS LST-50; acquired by the Royal Norwegian Navy in 1952; returned to the US in 1960
