= ORP Sęp =

Two ships of the Polish Navy have been named ORP Sęp (lit. vulture):

- ORP Sęp (1938) was an Orzeł-class submarine launched in 1938 and scrapped in 1972
- ORP Sęp (2002), previously the Kobben-class submarine HNoMS Skolpen acquired in 2002
