= MYG =

myG is an Indian consumer electronics retailer.

MYG or Myg may also refer to:

- Myg (character), a superhero in the DC Comics universe
- HNoMS Myg, an 1899 torpedo boat of the Norwegian Navy
- Manta language (ISO-639-3: myg), a Grassfields language of Cameroon
- Marayong railway station (station code: MYG), Sydney, Australia
- Mayaguana Airport (IATA: MYG), Bahamas
- Mayingite (International Mineralogical Association symbol: Myg), a pyrite mineral; see List of minerals recognized by the International Mineralogical Association (M)
- Mianyang (administrative division code: MYG), a city in Sichuan, China
- Miyagam Karjan Junction railway station (station code: MYG), Gujarat, India
