= Deerhound (disambiguation) =

Deerhound may refer to:

== Dog Breeds ==
- Pampas Deerhound
- Scottish Deerhound

== Other uses ==
- T17 Deerhound armored car
- MT Deerhound tugboat
- SS Deerhound (1901) passenger ship
- Armstrong Siddeley Deerhound aero engine
