= HNoMS Ellida (1880) =

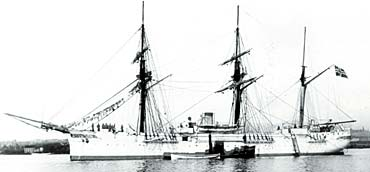
- Ellida after the rebuild in 1896

History

Norway
- Name: Ellida
- Builder: Navy Yard, Karljohansvern
- Yard number: 59
- Launched: 25 August 1880
- Commissioned: 1 July 1882
- Decommissioned: 1925
- Reclassified: Steam corvette, 1896
- Refit: 1896
- Fate: Sold 1925

General characteristics
- Class & type: .1 class gunboat
- Displacement: 1,006 long tons (1,022 t) or 1,045 long tons (1,062 t) (sources disagree)
- Propulsion: Reciprocating steam engines and sails
- Speed: 10.5 knots (12.1 mph; 19.4 km/h) under power
- Complement: 130 (121 after rebuild)
- Armament: 1 × 15 cm (6 in)/25 breech-loading gun; 1 × 12 cm (5 in)/25 breech-loading gun; 1 × underwater torpedo tube

HNoMS Ellida was a 1. class gunboat built for the Royal Norwegian Navy. Like the other Norwegian gunships of her era, she carried a reasonable heavy armament on a diminutive hull. A distinct feature of Ellida was that her funnel could be raised and lowered as needed. The vessel was built at the Naval Yard at Horten, and had yard number 59.

It is unclear from the sources if the listed armament is the original armament, or if Ellida originally was armed with a much heavier main gun like the slightly older 1. class gunboat Sleipner. Ellida, like Sleipner, carried an underwater torpedo tube in her bow for firing Whitehead torpedoes and four tubes mounted to cranes on her sides, and she was the second vessel in the Royal Norwegian Navy equipped with this weapon.

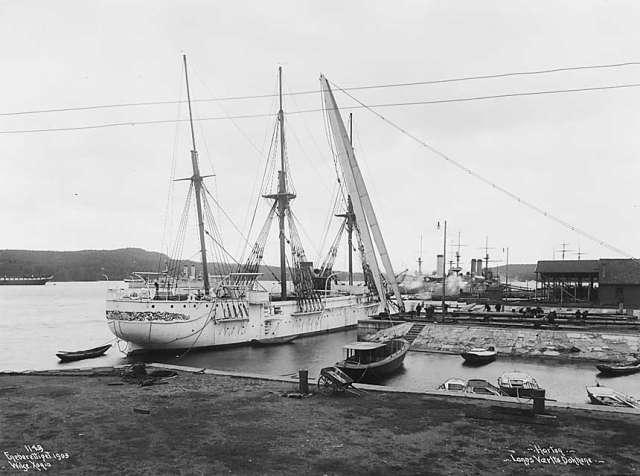
Ellida in Horten in 1903

Ellida underwent a refit in 1896, and was reclassified as a steam corvette. From 1898 she was used as a training vessel for cadets; she remained in this role until at least 1907. In 1914 Ellida was refitted once more, and became the mother ship and support vessel for the early Norwegian submarines (the A class). She was decommissioned and sold off in 1925.
