= HNoMS Nidaros (1841) =

History

Norway
- Name: Nidaros
- Namesake: Nidaros – the old name of the city of Trondheim
- Launched: 20 May 1841
- Fate: Scrapped 1903

General characteristics
- Type: Corvette
- Displacement: 900 long tons (914 t)
- Length: 53 m (173 ft 11 in)
- Propulsion: Sails; Steam engine, 200 hp (149 kW)
- Armament: 6 × 60-pounder cannon

HNoMS Nidaros was the first steam corvette of the Royal Norwegian Navy. She was built together with three other corvettes; although different in armament and size, these were quite similar: Nordstjernen, Ellida and Ørnen. These corvettes were built slim, for greater performance under sail.

The steam engine of Nidaros performed a maximum of 40 rpm, and the propeller had 6 blades. "Even with our conceptions today, we must admit that this corvette was of a very fine and slender construction (...) Both regarding its steam engine and the six 60-pounder bomb-cannons, Nidaros represented the new age [in the Norwegian Navy]."

The Nidaros was used as lodging- and training ship for the Navy's torpedo-branch, at least until 1876. She was finally scrapped in 1903.
