= HDMS Sælen =

Coordinates: 55.6869°N 12.6055°E

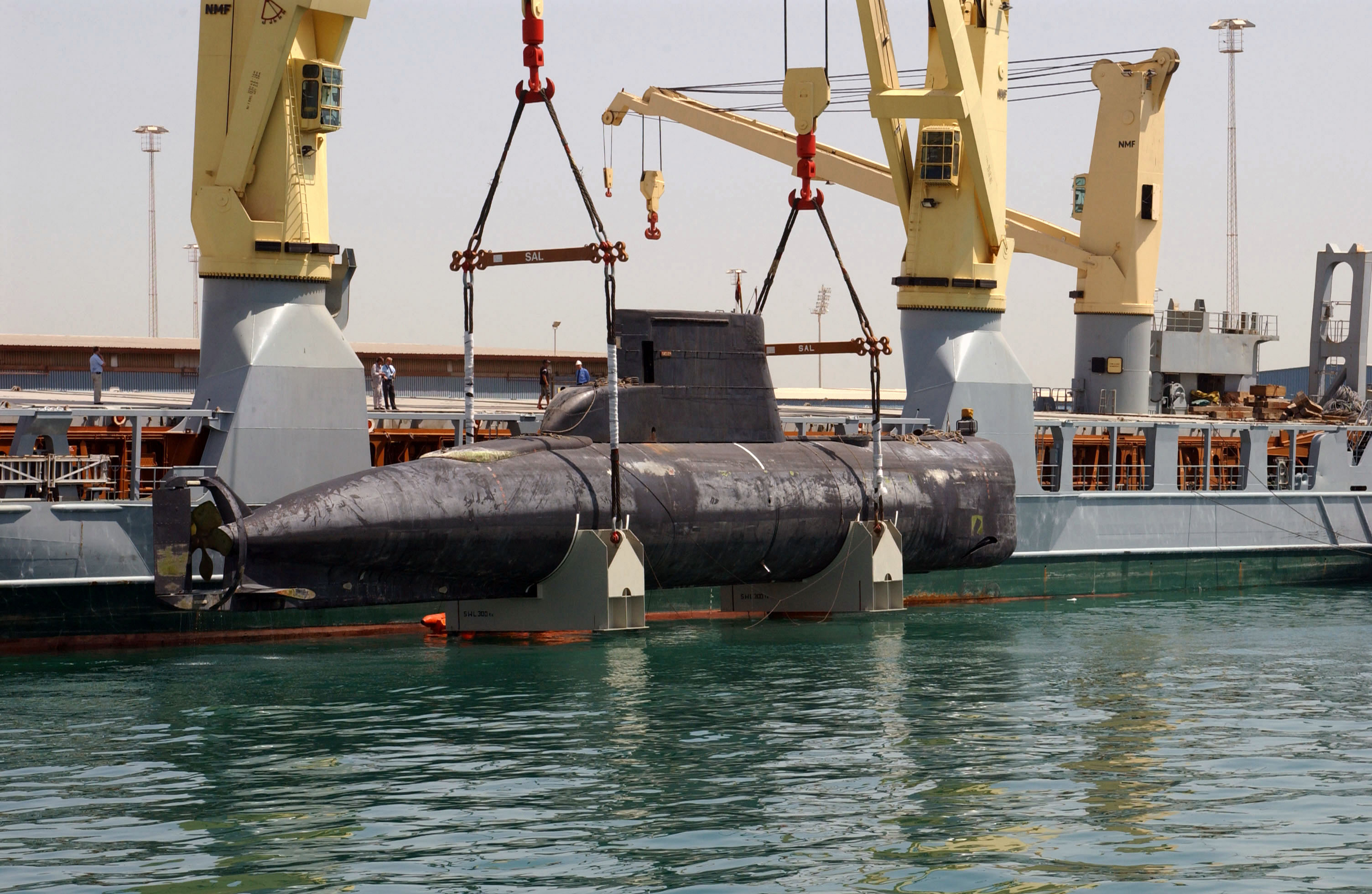
- Sælen lifted aboard Grietje for transport

History

Denmark
- Name: Sælen
- Laid down: 31 May 1965
- Launched: 3 October 1965
- Commissioned: 10 October 1990; (Danish navy)
- Decommissioned: 2004
- Fate: Museum at Holmen, Copenhagen

General characteristics
- Class & type: Tumleren-class submarine
- Displacement: 370 tons surfaced, 435 tons submerged
- Length: 47.20 m (154.9 ft)
- Beam: 4.70 m (15.4 ft)
- Draught: 3.80 m (12.5 ft)
- Propulsion: two MTU 1,100 hp diesel engines, one 1,700 hp electric motor
- Speed: 10 knots (19 km/h) surfaced, 17 knots (31 km/h) submerged
- Complement: 24 officers and men
- Armament: eight 533 mm (21-inch) torpedo tubes, eight torpedoes

HDMS Sælen (S323) (or KDM Sælen ) is one of the three Tumleren-class small coastal submarines of the Royal Danish Navy.

== History ==
She was built as a Type 207 submarine by Rheinstahl-Nordseewerke of Emden, Germany in 1965 for the Royal Norwegian Navy and served for 25 years as HNoMS Uthaug before being purchased by Denmark in 1990, and renamed after the seal. Her international call sign is OUCJ.

On 4 December 1990, Sælen sank in the Kattegat off Hesselø while being towed from Copenhagen to Aarhus. On 17 December, she was raised by the German floating crane Roland and taken to Aarhus for repair. On 10 August 1993, diving approval was issued and the boat was recommissioned.

Sælen served in the 2003 invasion of Iraq from May 2002 until June 2003. To speed her return to her homeport of Frederikshavn after 385 days of deployment in the Mediterranean Sea and the Persian Gulf, she was transported on board the heavy-lift ship Grietje.

== Museum ship ==
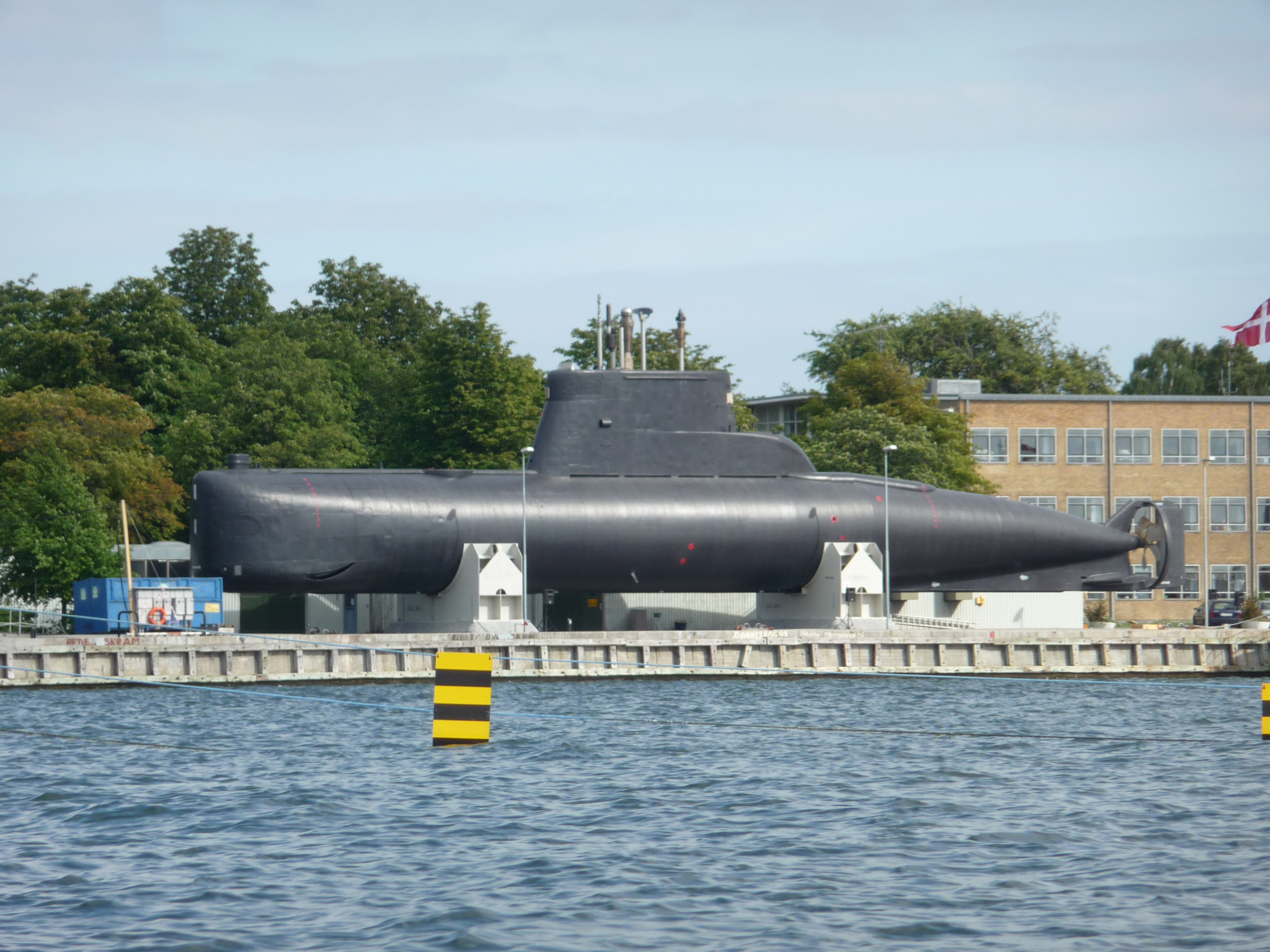
Sælen at Holmen, Copenhagen

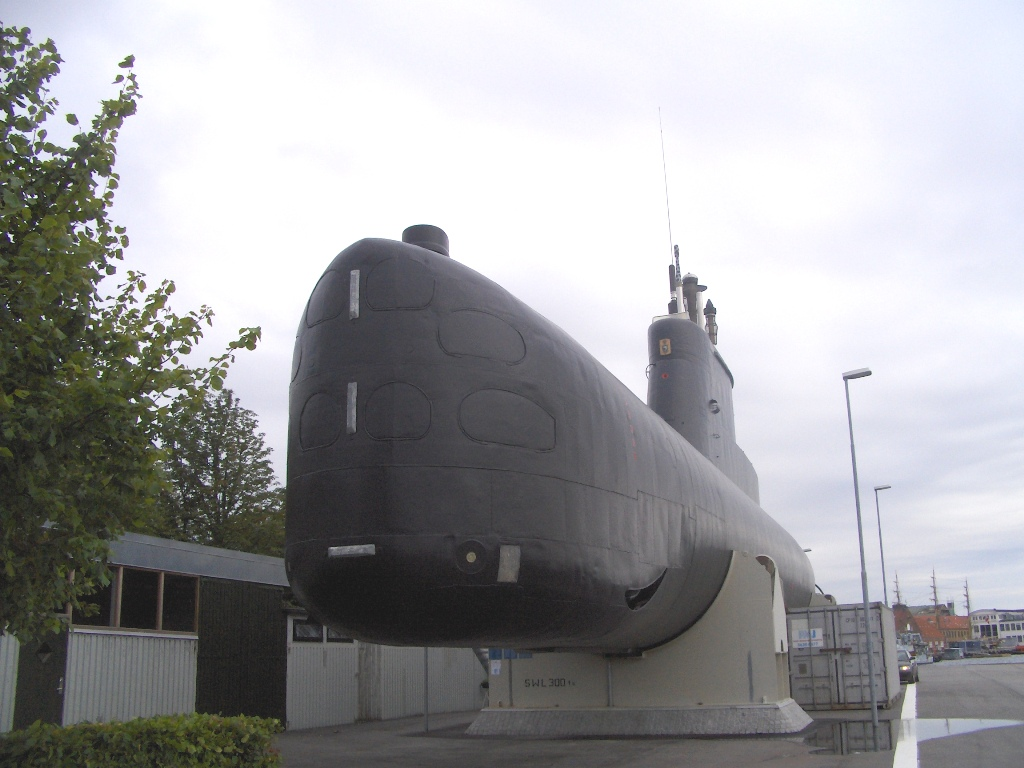
Sælen at Holmen, Copenhagen, close view

After her return from the Persian Gulf, Sælen was decommissioned and handed over to the Royal Danish Naval Museum. Sælen is now on the hard at the old navy headquarters at Holmen in central Copenhagen where she is open to visitors.

== See also ==
- HDMS Peder Skram (F352)
- List of submarine museums
- Submarines in the Royal Danish Navy
