= HMS Glatton =

Four ships of the British Royal Navy have been named HMS Glatton.

- The first HMS Glatton (1795) was a 56-gun fourth rate, originally an East Indiaman purchased in 1795 and converted. Participated in the 1797 Battle of Camperdown, and the 1801 Battle of Copenhagen. Converted to a water depot in 1814 and sunk as a breakwater in 1830.
- The second HMS Glatton (1855) was an Aetna-class ironclad floating battery launched in 1855 and broken up in 1864.
- The third HMS Glatton (1871) was a turret ship launched in 1871 and sold 1903.
- The fourth HMS Glatton (1914) was a coast defence ship, originally the Norwegian Bjørgvin, purchased in 1915 and accidentally blown up in September 1918.
