= NoCGV Eigun =

NoCGV Eigun (IMO number: 5359652) is a Norwegian Coast Guard vessel. It is part of the Coast Guard Squadron South, based at Haakonsvern Naval Base near Bergen. It is a former fishing trawler.

== Bibliography ==
- Saunders, Stephen, ed. (2004). Jane's Fighting Ships 2004–2005. Coulsdon, UK: Jane's Information Group. ISBN 0-7106-2623-1.
