= ORP Sęp (2002) =

Submarine

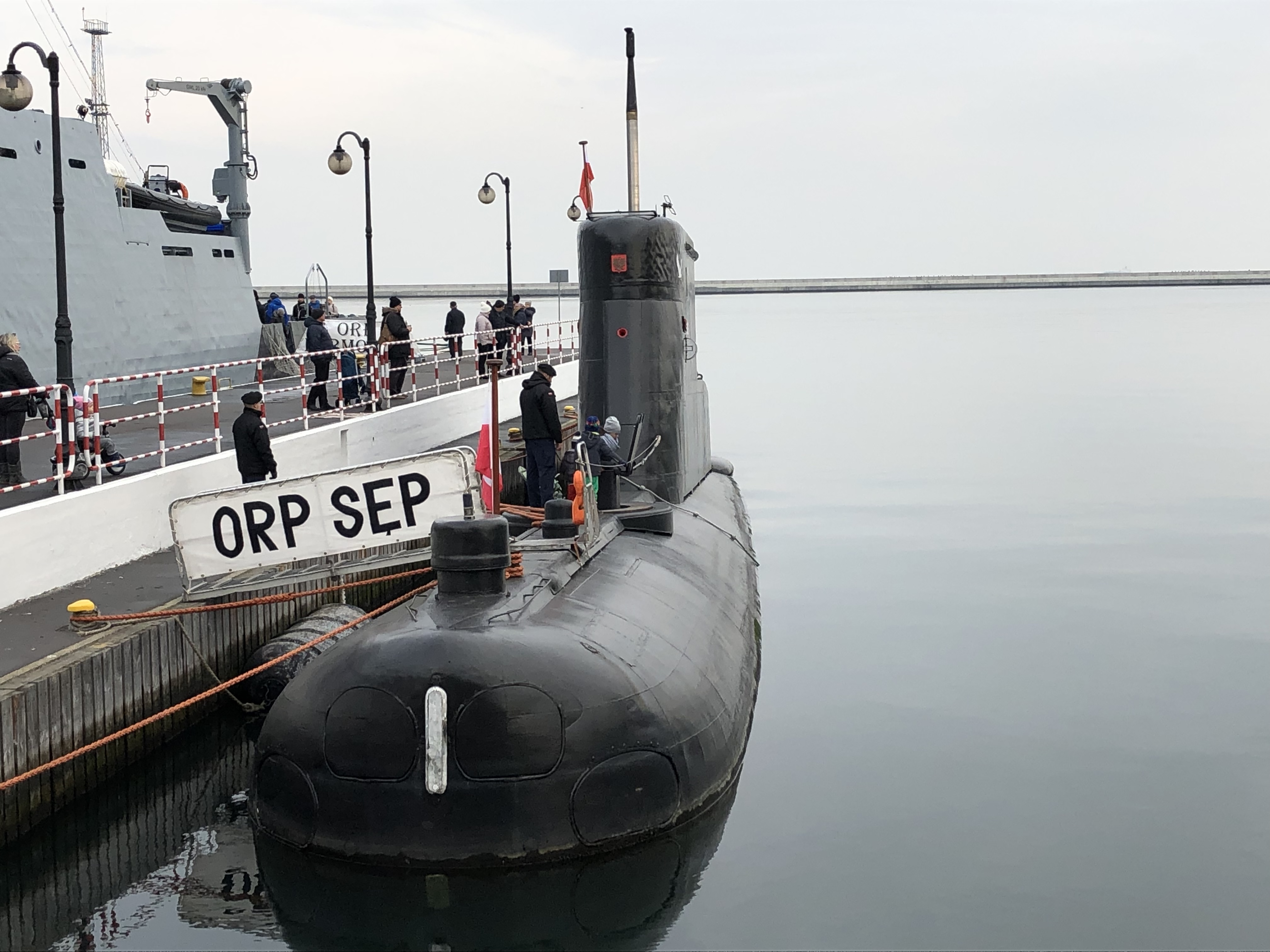
- Sęp in 2018

History

Poland
- Name: Sęp
- Commissioned: 2002
- Decommissioned: 14 December 2021
- Home port: Gdynia
- Status: Decommissioned

General characteristics
- Class & type: Kobben-class submarine
- Displacement: 435 t (428 long tons) surfaced; 485 t (477 long tons) submerged
- Length: 45.2 m (148 ft 4 in)
- Beam: 4.9 m (16 ft 1 in)
- Draft: 4.7 m (15 ft 5 in)
- Propulsion: Diesel-electric; 2 MTU 1,100 hp (820 kW) diesel engines; 1 1,700 hp (1,300 kW) electric motor
- Speed: 10 knots (19 km/h; 12 mph) surfaced 17 knots (31 km/h; 20 mph) submerged
- Complement: 17
- Armament: 8 × 533 mm (21 in) torpedo tubes

ORP Sęp, formerly HNoMS Skolpen (S306), was one of the four Kobben-class submarines in service with the Polish Navy, originally serving with the Royal Norwegian Navy.

== History ==
Sęp was built between 1964 and 1967 for the Royal Norwegian Navy by Nordseewerke in Emden, Germany. In 2001, She was decommissioned with the rest of the Kobbens still in service. Sęp, along with Bielik (Ex-Svenner), Sokół (Ex-Stord), Kondor (Ex-Kunna) and Jastrząb (Ex-Kobben, parts boat) were given to the Polish Navy between 2002 and 2004. She was decommissioned in December 2021 alongside her sister Bielik, with their decommissioning marking the end of active service for the Kobben class.
