= NoCGV Garsøy =

NoCGV Garsøy (KV6) (IMO number: 4603408) is a Norwegian Coast Guard vessel. It has a gross tonnage of 195 and was built in 1988 at Brødrene shipyard at Eikefjord. It is part of Coast Guard Squadron South and patrols the inner waters. The Norwegian Coast Guard is a part of the Royal Norwegian Navy but has separate vessels, many of which are purpose-built. Four of these vessels are capable of embarking one or more helicopters. Norway's exclusive economic zone, the coast guard's area of responsibility, is about 2.2 million square kilometres; the largest in Western Europe.

== Bibliography ==
- Saunders, Stephen, ed. (2004). Jane's Fighting Ships 2004–2005. Coulsdon, UK: Jane's Information Group. ISBN 0-7106-2623-1.
