= MV Baden =

Honduran cargo ship (1966–1988)

History

Norway
- Name: Baden
- Owner: Fred. Olsen & Co.
- Builder: Trondhjems Mekaniske Verksted, Trondheim
- Yard number: 213
- Launched: May 1966

Norway
- Name: Sambi
- Owner: Karsten Solbakk, Fedje
- Port of registry: Bergen
- Acquired: 1976

Norway
- Name: Sambi
- Owner: Austrheim & Fedje Sparebank
- Port of registry: Mastrevik
- Acquired: October 1981

Panama
- Name: Sambi
- Owner: Naviera Incorporada S.A.
- Port of registry: Finnsness
- Acquired: May 1982

Honduras
- Name: Aden
- Owner: Arvid Eriksen
- Port of registry: San Lorenzo
- Acquired: 1985
- Renamed: Baden (February 1988)
- Fate: Sunk on 26 December 1988 near Texel, the Netherlands

General characteristics
- Class & type: Coastal trading vessel
- Tonnage: 298 grt
- Length: 58.36 m (191.5 ft)
- Beam: 10.02 m (32.9 ft)
- Draught: 4.6 m (15.1 ft)
- Installed power: 800 hp
- Propulsion: Diesel engine (Caterpillar); single shaft; 1 screw
- Speed: 10 knots (19 km/h)
- Crew: 3

MV Baden, also renamed into MV Sambi and MV Aden, was a 1966 Norwegian built coastal trading vessel. The ship was later sailing under the flag of Panama (1982–1985) and Honduras (1985–1988). On 26 February 1988 the ship sank near Texel, the Netherlands, after the ship tilted due to shifting cargo. All crew members survived by sprinting into the water. Criticism of the rescue operation followed.

== Ship details ==
She was 58.36 metres (191 ft 6 in) long, a width of 10.02 m (32 ft 10 in) and 4.6 m (15 ft 1 in) draught. She had tonnage of 298 GRT. She was propulsed by a Caterpillar diesel engine, a single shaft and had one screw. She had a speed of 10 knots (19 km/h; 12 mph). She was assigned yard number 213 and IMO number 217512.

== History ==
The ship Baden was launched in May 1966. She was built by Trondhjems Mekaniske Verksted in Trondheim and owned by Fred. Olsen & Co. In 1976 it came in possession by Karsten Solbakk, Fedje with home port of Bergen and changed the name into Sambi. After the shipping company's bankruptcy the ship was owned by Austrheim & Fedje Sparebank from October 1981 in with her home port in Mastrevik. From May 1982 the ship sailed under Panamanian flag of the shipping company Naviera Incorporada S.A., managed by Ivar Westerbotn in Finnsness.

When the ship started sailing under Hondurian flag from 1985, the ship was renamed into Aden. The ship had homeport San Lorenzo and was part of the Arvid Eriksen shipping company owned by Arild Thorensen & Co in Oslo. In January the ship was renamed into Baden; like her original name.

=== Fate ===
In December 1988 she was en route from Bergen, Norway to Antwerp, Belgium with a cargo of steel; according to the captain of the ship "pellets". On 26 December there was a gale, a northwest wind of Beaufort scale 8. After the iron cargo started shifting, the ship came into distress near Texel, the Netherlands. The crew reported to the Coast Guard there were problems with the engine and that a hole had appeared in the ship's hull. The captain initially refused any help due to the high costs.

At 20.10pm the captain said to the coastguard the ship was tilted 35 degrees and accepted a tugboat. The tug Smit Lloyd 57 went to the ship and was able to connect the ship but the condition of Baden deteriorated quickly. Smit Lloyd 57 called via the lighthouse watcher for a lifeboat. The Coast Guard of Den Helder sent at 9:11pm lifeboat Suzanna and a helicopter.

At the request of the Smit Lloyd 57 the three crew members jumped in their life suits into the water. The tug gave them temporary rubber boats. After 25 minutes they were picked up and brought to Den Helder by Smit Lloyd 57.

Shortly after the crew members jumped into the water, at around 10pm (local time), Baden sank. The ship's cat and dog were killed. After the ship sank, lifeboat Suzanna arrived and couldn't do anything anymore.

=== Aftermath ===
Days after the accident, there was criticism of the coast guard for calling in rescue companies too late. In this case, the three crew members were unnecessarily in the water for 25 minutes. According to the Royal Netherlands Sea Rescue Institution, coast guard would also in seven other cases the same year intervened too late in situations where ships are listing. The coast guard defended itself.

== Wreck ==
The wreck is located 7.5 miles (12.1 km) west-north-west of Texel lighthouse. Divers from Texel and Terschelling have dived to the wreck several times. The ship is lying upside down. Everything that could be dismantled has been recovered by divers from Texel.
