= HNoMS Sleipner (1877) =

Royal Norwegian Navy gunboat

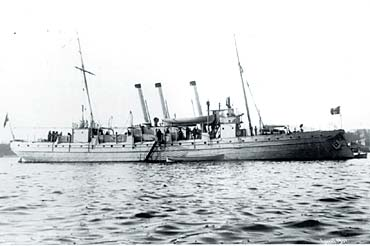
- Sleipner after the rebuild in 1900

History

Norway
- Name: Sleipner
- Namesake: Sleipnir – the eight-legged steed of Odin
- Builder: Navy Yard, Karljohansvern
- Yard number: 56
- Laid down: 1 January 1877
- Launched: 7 August 1877
- Christened: 20 May 1878
- Decommissioned: 1935
- Out of service: 1 January 1919
- Fate: Scrapped in 1935

General characteristics
- Class & type: .1 class gunboat
- Displacement: 720 long tons (732 t)
- Length: 53.26 m (174 ft 9 in)
- Draught: 3.35 m (11 ft 0 in)
- Propulsion: 650 hp (485 kW) Reciprocating steam engines and sails
- Speed: 12.7 knots (14.6 mph; 23.5 km/h) under power; 13.4 knots (15.4 mph; 24.8 km/h) under power with sails
- Complement: 90
- Armament: 1 × 26 cm (10 in)/22 breech-loading gun; 1 × 15 cm (5.9 in)/25 breech-loading gun; 1 × underwater torpedo tube

HNoMS Sleipner was a 1. class gunboat built for the Royal Norwegian Navy. Like all other Norwegian gunships of her era, she carried a heavy armament on a diminutive hull. The vessel was built at the Naval Yard at Horten, and had yard number 56.

== Fitout ==
Sleipner's main weapon was a 26 cm (10-inch) cannon, of the same make and model other navies mounted on battleships. Sleipner also carried an underwater torpedo tube in her bow for firing Whitehead torpedoes, and she was the first vessel in the Royal Norwegian Navy equipped with this weapon.

== Rebuild ==
In 1900 Sleipner was rebuilt, and her masts and rigging removed. After her rebuild she was used as a cadet ship (training vessel) until 1915, when she started a new life as a floating barracks. Between 1921 and 1932 Sleipner was used as a floating depot for the fledgling Royal Norwegian Navy Air Service, before she was finally decommissioned and scrapped in 1935.

== Notable crew ==
- Elias Aslaksen, served as an officer cadet on board Sleipner in 1908.

== Gallery ==
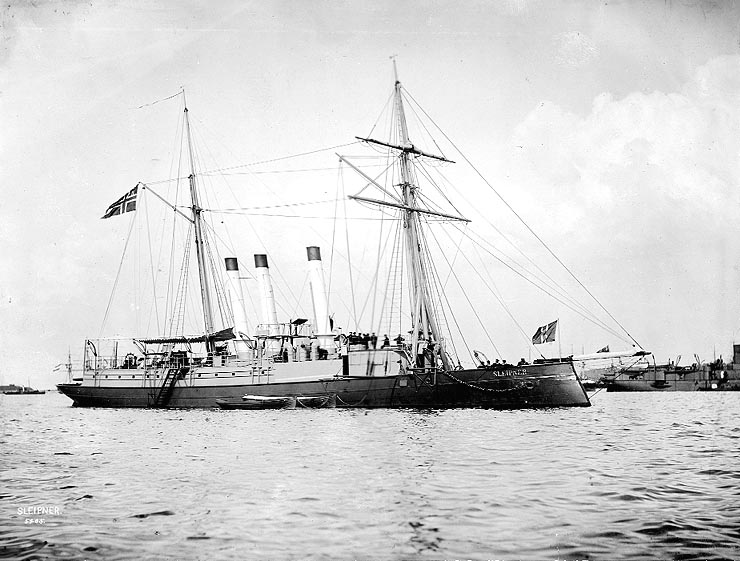
Sleipner at the opening ceremony of the Kiel Canal in 1895

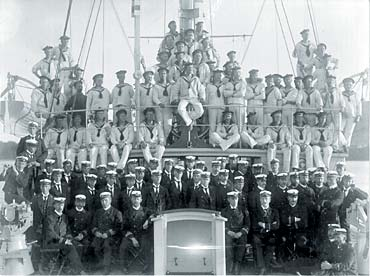
The crew and cadets aboard Sleipner photographed in 1904
