= HNoMS Myg =

History

Norway
- Name: Myg
- Namesake: Mosquito
- Builder: Karljohansvern Navy Yard
- Yard number: 82
- Launched: 29 August 1899
- Commissioned: 1899

General characteristics
- Displacement: 25 long tons (25 t)
- Speed: 17 knots (20 mph; 31 km/h)

HNoMS Myg was a small torpedo boat for use in fjords and harbours. Myg was built at the Royal Norwegian Navy's shipyard in Horten, with the yard number 82. Apparently the design was not considered successful, and no further vessels in the class was laid down.
