= ORP Bielik (2003) =

Submarine

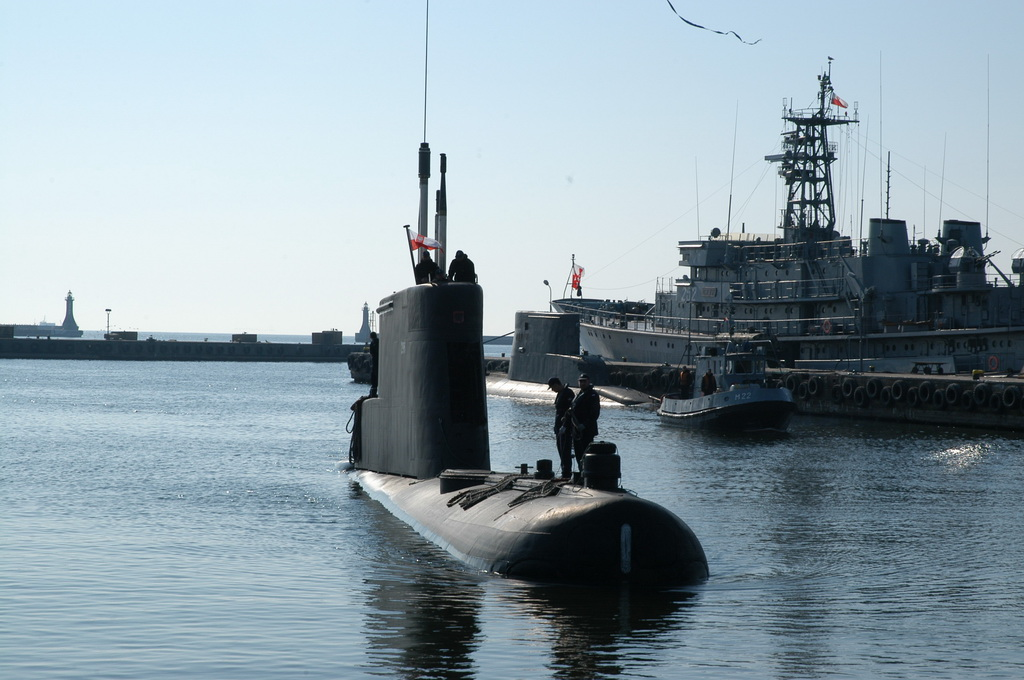
- Bielik

History

Poland
- Name: Bielik
- Commissioned: 2003
- Decommissioned: 14 December 2021
- Home port: Gdynia
- Status: Decommissioned

General characteristics
- Class & type: Kobben-class submarine
- Displacement: 435 tons surfaced; 485 tons submerged
- Length: 45.2 m (148 ft 4 in)
- Beam: 4.9 m (16 ft 1 in)
- Draft: 4.7 m (15 ft 5 in)
- Speed: 18 knots (33 km/h; 21 mph) submerged
- Complement: 17
- Armament: 8 × 533 mm (21 in) torpedo tubes

ORP Bielik, formerly HNoMS Svenner (S309), was one of four Kobben-class submarines in service with the Polish Navy. The vessel and its sister ships were built in the period 1964–1967 by Rheinstahl Nordseewerke GmbH in Emden, West Germany for the Royal Norwegian Navy. The Kobben-class submarines were given to Poland in the 2002–2004 period after having been replaced by Ula-class submarines in Norway. Before entering active Polish service the boat was modified in Gdańsk. She was decommissioned in December 2021 alongside her sister Sęp, with the decommissioning marking the end of active service for the Kobben-class submarines.

== Bibliography ==
- Saunders, Stephen, ed. (2004). Jane's Fighting Ships 2004–2005. Coulsdon, UK: Jane's Information Group. ISBN 0-7106-2623-1.
