= MT Deerhound =

- Deerhound escorting HMS Somerset

History

United Kingdom
- Name: Deerhound
- Owner: Royal Maritime Auxiliary Service (1966–1996); Babcock Rosyth Defense Ltd (1996-2019)
- Operator: Rosyth Marine Services (1996 - 2011).briggs marine=2011-2019)
- Builder: Appledore Shipbuilders, Appledore, North Devon
- Launched: 22 February 1966
- Completed: June 1966
- Homeport: Lowestoft
- Identification: IMO number: 4902191; MMSI number: 235097864; Callsign: 2FPZ4
- Nickname(s): The Mighty Deerhound
- Status: Active
- Notes: Pennant number (as RMAS vessel): A155

General characteristics
- Class & type: Dog class tug
- Displacement: 241 tons (light); 305 tons (full load)
- Length: 28.65 m (94.0 ft) (overall); 25.91 m (85.0 ft) (pp
- Beam: 7.72 m (25.3 ft)
- Draught: 3.87 m (12.7 ft)
- Propulsion: 2 × Lister-Blackstone (ERS8) 8-cylinder diesel engines; 2 × propellers; 1,320 bhp
- Speed: 12 knots (22 km/h)
- Range: 2,236 nautical miles (4,000 km) at 10 knots (19 km/h)
- Complement: 8 for RMAS use, 4 in commercial use.
- Sensors & processing systems: Radar
- Notes: bollard pull-17 Tons

MT Deerhound (formerly RMAS Deerhound) is a Dog-class medium berthing tugboat built for the Royal Maritime Auxiliary Service (RMAS) in 1966 by Appledore Shipbuilders, Appledore, North Devon.

Both Deerhound and her sister Elkhound were designed to work with the Polaris submarines of the Royal Navy and as such they are fendered all the way down the stem and part way along the keel to prevent damage to the submarines hull under water. In July 1983, during Deerhound's time with the RMAS, she met the submarine HMS Conqueror, returning from taking part in the Falklands War, where she sank the ARA General Belgrano. Deerhound helped her to berth at Faslane Naval Base.

Deerhound and Elkhound were sold in 1996 and are now owned by Babcock Rosyth Defense Ltd (BRDL). They are operated for BRDL by Rosyth Marine Services who also supply a number of their own vessels and barges to BRDL for the support of the Rosyth Royal Dockyard. In late 2011 the operating contract for these vessels was taken over Briggs Marine of Burntisland. Deerhound has been sold to a private individual Aug 2019.

Deerhound is a twin screw tug with the screws driven by two Lister-Blackstone 8-cylinder diesel engines via a reversible gearbox. This along with her twin rudders gives her high manoeuvrability for a traditional tug. She has a bollard pull of 17 tonnes making her powerful enough to work with every ship in the Royal Navy as well as a variety of barges and lighters. Towing can be done via her Clyde towing hook or from her forward bits on the bow. Barges are usually lashed up alongside, with two springs and a head and stern line to allow for greater control around the dockyard.
