= ORP Sokół (2002) =

Kobben-class submarine of the Polish Navy

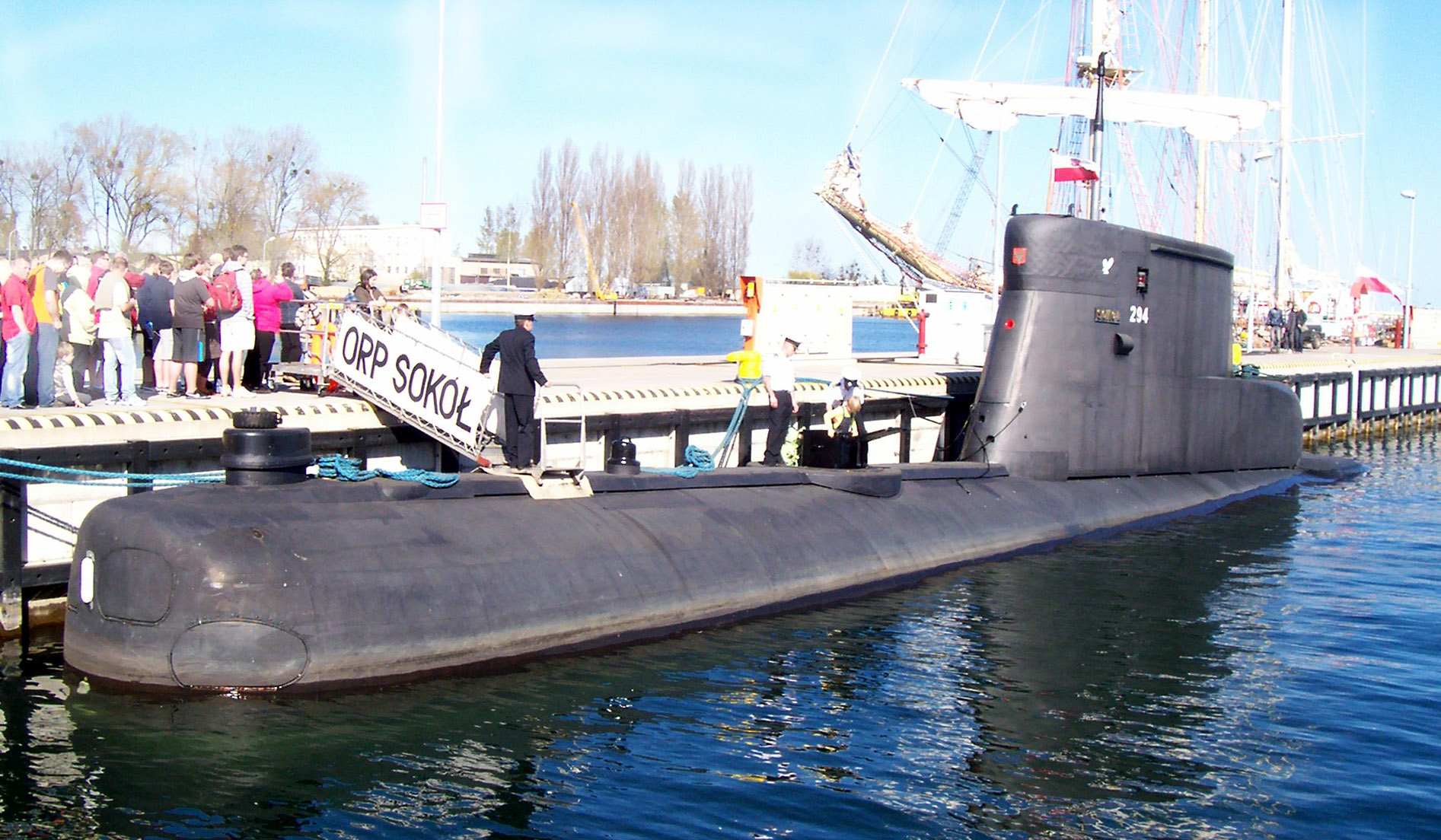
- ORP Sokół, KNM Stord

History

Poland, Norway
- Ordered: 1964
- Builder: Nordseewerke
- Laid down: 1 April 1966
- Launched: 2 September 1966
- Completed: 14 February 1967
- Commissioned: RNoN: 1967; PN: 4 July 2002
- Decommissioned: RNoN: 2002 PN: 8 June 2018
- Out of service: 2018
- Renamed: 2002
- Home port: Gdynia
- Status: Rebuilt into a museum ship

General characteristics
- Displacement: 435 tons surfaced; 485 tons submerged
- Length: 45.2 m
- Beam: 4.9 m
- Draught: 4.7 m
- Speed: 12 knots surfaced; 18 knots submerged
- Complement: 17 men
- Armament: 8 x 533mm torpedo tubes

ORP Sokół, formerly HNoMS Stord, is one of four Kobben-class submarines of the Polish Navy. The vessel was built by Rheinstahl Nordseewerke GmbH in Emden, Germany (known there as the Type 207) for the Royal Norwegian Navy as HNoMS Stord. The vessel served with the Royal Norwegian Navy from 1967 until it was given to Poland in 2002. Sokół was modified in Gdańsk after the handover. The ship was decommissioned on 8 June 2018. In the same year, she joined the program about converting a ship into a museum ship. In July 2020, work began on the unit in order to prepare it for museum functions.

In November 2023, Sokół was moved to the Naval Museum in Gdynia.
