= HNoMS Ellida (1849) =

Royal Norwegian Navy ship

History

Norway
- Name: Ellida
- Commissioned: 16 May 1849
- Fate: Sold, 1866

General characteristics
- Type: Corvette
- Displacement: 436 long tons (443 t)
- Propulsion: Sails
- Complement: 130
- Armament: 10 × 18-pounder cannons L/13; 1 × 4-pounder howitzer

HNoMS Ellida was a Royal Norwegian Navy corvette first commissioned 16 May 1849. Cordt Holtermann Valeur was her first commander. The ship was used as a cadet-ship until 1864 and sold in 1866.

== Sources ==
- Norwegian Navy history page
