= Kobben-class submarine =

Version of the Type 205 submarine

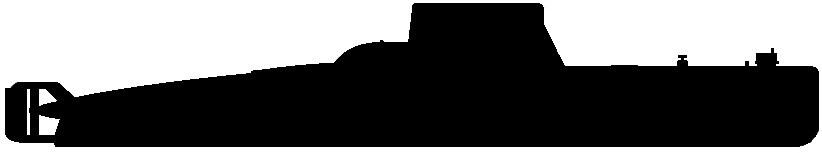
- Kobben-class profile

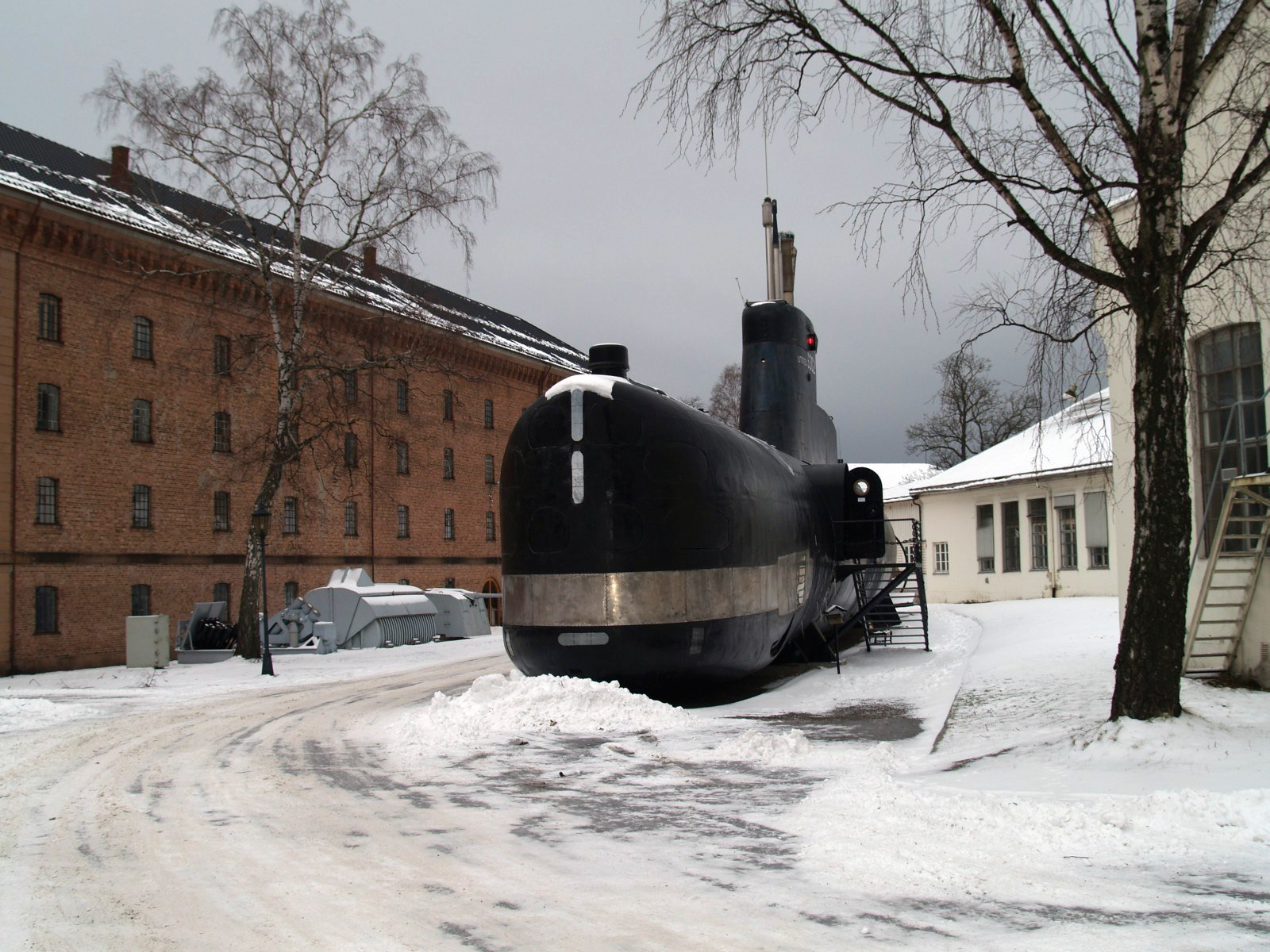
- HNoMs Utstein, now a museum ship

Class overview
- Builders: Nordseewerke GmbH
- Operators: Royal Norwegian Navy; Royal Danish Navy; Polish Navy
- Succeeded by: Ula class
- Subclasses: Tumleren class
- Built: 1963–1966
- In commission: 1964–2021
- Completed: 15
- Active: 0
- Laid up: 3
- Preserved: 5 (2 in Poland, 2 in Denmark, 1 in Norway)

General characteristics
- Type: Coastal submarine
- Displacement: 435 t (428 long tons) surfaced; 485 t (477 long tons) submerged
- Length: 47.2 m (154 ft 10 in)
- Beam: 4.7 m (15 ft 5 in)
- Draft: 3.8 m (12 ft 6 in)
- Propulsion: Diesel-electric; 2 MTU 1,100 hp (820 kW) diesel engines; 1 1,700 hp (1,300 kW) electric motor
- Speed: 10 knots (19 km/h; 12 mph) surfaced; 17 knots (31 km/h; 20 mph) submerged
- Range: 4,200 nmi (7,800 km; 4,800 mi) at 8 knots (15 km/h; 9.2 mph); 228 nmi (422 km) at 4 knots (7.4 km/h; 4.6 mph)
- Test depth: 180 m (590 ft)
- Complement: 24
- Armament: 8 533 mm (21.0 in) torpedo tubes capable of carrying the following torpedo types: T1 / T1 mod 1, Mk-37 Mod 1/2, TP-612, TP-613

The Kobben class (also known as Type 207) is a customized version of the German Type 205 submarine. Fifteen vessels of this class were built for use by the Royal Norwegian Navy in the 1960s. The class later saw service with Denmark and Poland. The boats have since been withdrawn from service in the Norwegian and Danish navies. The Polish Navy operated two Kobben-class submarines (Bielik, Sęp) until 2021.

== History ==
Along with the rest of the Royal Norwegian Navy, the submarine fleet was to be modernized according to the Fleet plan of 1960. After the war, Norway needed a navy more suited for coastal operations rather than large, seagoing vessels. This made the choice of a new type of submarines rather slim, not many NATO submarines being suited for this type of operations. A German Type 201 submarine U-3 was lent to the Royal Norwegian Navy for evaluation and adaptation between 10 July 1962 and 20 June 1964, with the name HNoMS Kobben. The result was the Type 207, of which 15 vessels were delivered to Norway in the period 1964 – 67. All Kobben-class submarines were built by Rheinstahl Nordseewerke GmbH in Emden. Between 1985 – 93, six boats were lengthened by 2 m (6 ft 7 in) and modernized, most notably with new sonar equipment.

On 24 November 1972, the Kobben-class submarine HNoMS Sklinna of the Royal Norwegian Navy had "contact" with what they presumed was a Whiskey-class submarine, after 14 days of "hunt" in Sognefjord. Military documents released in 2009 confirm this episode.

During that period, four others were sold to the Royal Danish Navy (known there as the Tumleren class), three operational (modernized) and one for spare parts. HDMS Sælen served in the 2003 invasion of Iraq from May 2002 until June 2003.

In 2001, the Kobben class was completely phased out in Norwegian service, replaced by the newer Ula class. Five modernized vessels were given to the Polish Navy, four as operational units and one for spare parts. Before they were transferred, the Polish crews were trained and the boats were overhauled.

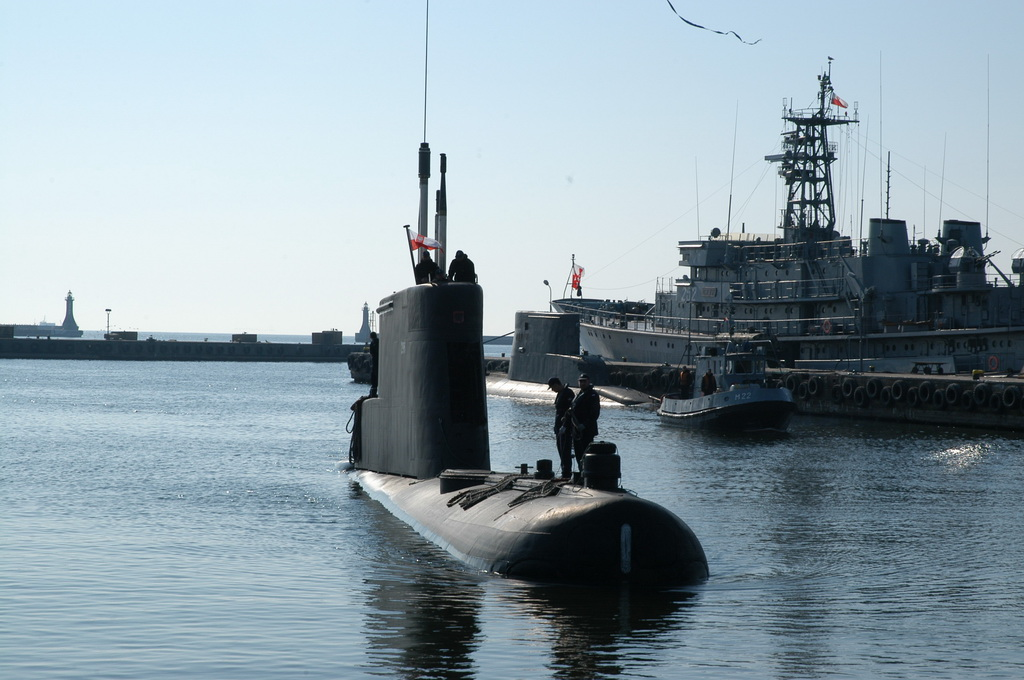
ORP Bielik in service with the Polish Navy

During 2004, all of the operational Danish boats (Tumleren, Sælen and Springeren) were decommissioned. They were mothballed as of 2005, waiting to be scrapped or transferred to another nation.

== Vessels ==
Kobben class — significant dates
| Pennant | Name | Commissioned | Notes |
|---|---|---|---|
| S315 | Kaura | 1965 | Transferred to Denmark in 1991 for spare parts |
| S316 | Kinn | 8 April 1964 | Scuttled in Bjørnafjord in 1990 |
| S317 | Kya | 15 June 1964 | Transferred to Denmark in 1991 as HDMS Springeren (S324). Preserved as a museum ship in Langeland. |
| S318 | Kobben | 15 August 1964 | Transferred to Poland in 2002 for spare parts and as of 17 December 2011 moved to Maritime Academy in Gdynia (Akademia Marynarki Wojennej) for crew training. |
| S319 | Kunna | 29 October 1964 | Transferred to Poland in 2003 as ORP Kondor. Decommissioned as of 20 December 2017. |
| S300 | Ula | 1965 | Renamed Kinn (S316) in 1987, scrapped in 1998. Co-operated in the Anglo Netherlands Norwegian Cooperation Program (ANNCP) program regarding research on stealth properties of submarines. |
| S301 | Utsira | 1965 | Scrapped in 1998 |
| S302 | Utstein | 1965 | Transferred to the naval museum in Horten in 1998 as a museum ship |
| S303 | Utvær | 1965 | Transferred to Denmark in 1989 as HDMS Tumleren (S322) |
| S304 | Uthaug | 1965 | Transferred to Denmark in 1990 as HDMS Sælen (S323), now a museum ship in Copenhagen. |
| S305 | Sklinna | 1966 | Reconditioned in 1989, scrapped in 2001 |
| S306 | Skolpen | 1966 | Transferred to Poland in 2002 as ORP Sęp. Retired on 14 December 2021 |
| S307 | Stadt | 1966 | Scrapped in 1989 |
| S308 | Stord | 1967 | Transferred to Poland in 2002 as ORP Sokół. Decommissioned in Poland in 2018 and being sent to Naval Museum, Gdynia. |
| S309 | Svenner | 1967 | Transferred to Poland in 2003 as ORP Bielik. Retired on 14 December 2021 |
