= HNoMS Trondheim (F302) =

Norwegian naval frigate (1966–2006)

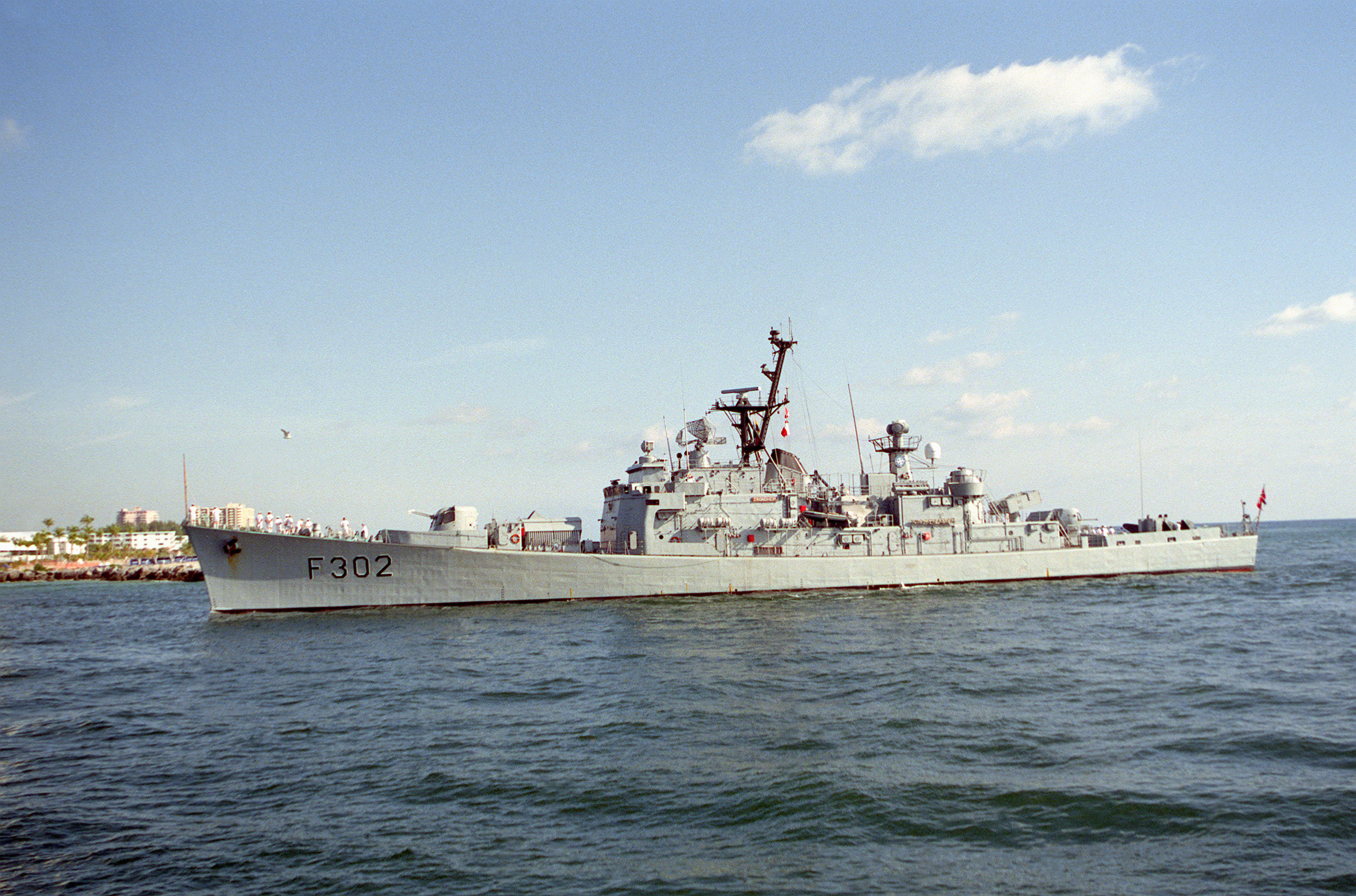
- Trondheim entering Port Everglades, Florida, in 1993.

History

Norway
- Name: Trondheim
- Ordered: 1960
- Launched: 4 September 1964
- Commissioned: 2 June 1966
- Decommissioned: June 2006
- Out of service: September 2025
- Identification: F302
- Fate: Used as target ship in September 2025 and sunk.

General characteristics
- Class & type: Oslo-class frigate
- Displacement: 1,450 long tons (1,473 t) standard; 1,745 long tons (1,773 t) full load
- Length: 96.6 m (316 ft 11 in)
- Beam: 11.2 m (36 ft 9 in)
- Draft: 5.5 m (18 ft 1 in)
- Propulsion: Twin steam boilers, one high pressure and one low pressure steam turbine, 20,000 hp (14,914 kW)
- Speed: 25 knots (29 mph; 46 km/h)
- Range: 4,500 nautical miles at 15 knots (8,300 km at 28 km/h)
- Complement: 120 (129 max) officers and men
- Sensors & processing systems: Siemens/Plessey AWS-9 long range air search radar; Racal DeccaTM 1226 surface search radar in I band; Kongsberg MSI-90(U) tracking and fire control system; Raytheon Mk 95; I/J-band search and track radar for Sea Sparrow; Medium frequency Thomson-CSF Sintra/Simrad TSM 2633 combined hull and VDS active sonar; High frequency Terne III active sonar
- Electronic warfare & decoys: 4 × Mark 36 SRBOC chaff launchers ESM: AR 700 suite
- Armament: 2 × 3 in (76 mm) cannon; 1 × Bofors 40mm/70 anti-aircraft gun; 2 × 20 mm Rheinmetall anti-aircraft guns; 2 × 12.7 mm anti-aircraft guns; 6 × Penguin SSMs (usually not mounted); 1 × 8-cell Raytheon RIM-7M Sea Sparrow Mk 29 SAM system; 6 × Kongsberg Terne ASW rocket-thrown depth charges; 2 × triple 324 mm (12.8 in) Mark 32 torpedo tubes (Sting Ray torpedoes)

HNoMS Trondheim (pennant number F302) was an Oslo-class frigate of the Royal Norwegian Navy.

== Service history ==
On 17 March 2006 at 20:10 CET, Trondheim ran aground off Lines island in Sør-Trøndelag. No injuries among the 121-man crew were reported. The incident was reported from the ship itself, and at 20:30 it came loose again. Water flooded two compartments (paint storage and forward pump room) of the ship. The compartments were sealed and three ships were sent to assist the frigate. The frigate was towed to port in Bergen by the coast guard vessel NoCGV Tromsø.

HNoMS Trondheim was used after decommissioning as a target ship for the testing of Norway's Naval Strike Missile, and was hit on 6 June 2013.

In September 2025, she was used as a target ship during naval exercise Exercise Ægir 25 and was struck by Naval Strike Missiles launched by HMS Somerset and HNoMS Thor Heyerdahl and was sunk by a torpedo fired from the Ula-class submarine HNoMS Uthaug in Andfjorden.
