= HNoMS Stavanger (F303) =

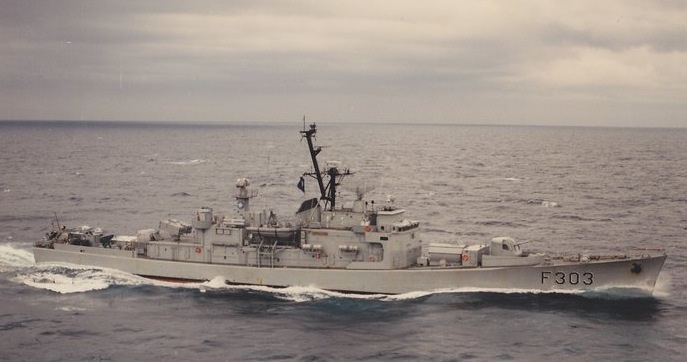
- Norwegian frigate Stavanger (F303).

History

Norway
- Name: Stavanger
- Ordered: 1960
- Builder: Navy Main Yard, Karljohansvern, Horten, Norway
- Launched: 4 February 1966
- Commissioned: 8 December 1967
- Decommissioned: June 1998
- Identification: F303
- Fate: Expended as a target 2001

General characteristics
- Class & type: Oslo-class frigate
- Displacement: 1,450 long tons (1,473 t) standard; 1,745 long tons (1,773 t) full load
- Length: 96.6 m (316 ft 11 in)
- Beam: 11.2 m (36 ft 9 in)
- Draft: 5.5 m (18 ft 1 in)
- Propulsion: Twin steam boilers, one high pressure and one low pressure steam turbine, 20,000 hp (14,914 kW)
- Speed: 25 knots (29 mph; 46 km/h)
- Range: 4,500 nautical miles at 15 knots (8,300 km at 28 km/h)
- Complement: 120 (129 max) officers and men
- Sensors & processing systems: Siemens/Plessey AWS-9 long range air search radar; Racal DeccaTM 1226 surface search radar in I band; Kongsberg MSI-90(U) tracking and fire control system; Raytheon Mk 95; I/J-band search and track radar for Sea Sparrow; Medium frequency Thomson-CSF Sintra/Simrad TSM 2633 combined hull and VDS active sonar; High frequency Terne III active sonar
- Electronic warfare & decoys: 4 × Mark 36 SRBOC chaff launchers ESM: AR 700 suite
- Armament: 2 × 3 in (76 mm) cannon; 1 × Bofors 40mm/70 anti-aircraft gun; 2 × 20 mm Rheinmetall anti-aircraft guns; 2 × 12.7 mm anti-aircraft guns; 6 × Penguin SSMs (usually not mounted); 1 × 8-cell Raytheon RIM-7M Sea Sparrow Mk 29 SAM system; 6 × Kongsberg Terne ASW rocket-thrown depth charges; 2 × triple 324 mm (12.8 in) Mark 32 torpedo tubes (Sting Ray torpedoes)

HNoMS Stavanger (pennant number F303) was an Oslo-class frigate of the Royal Norwegian Navy. Her namesake comes from the Norwegian city of Stavanger.

Stavanger was decommissioned in 1998. She was later used for target practice and sunk in 2001 by a single DM2A3 torpedo launched from the Ula-class submarine Utstein (pennant number S302).
