= HNoMS Oslo (F300) =

Royal Norwegian Navy frigate

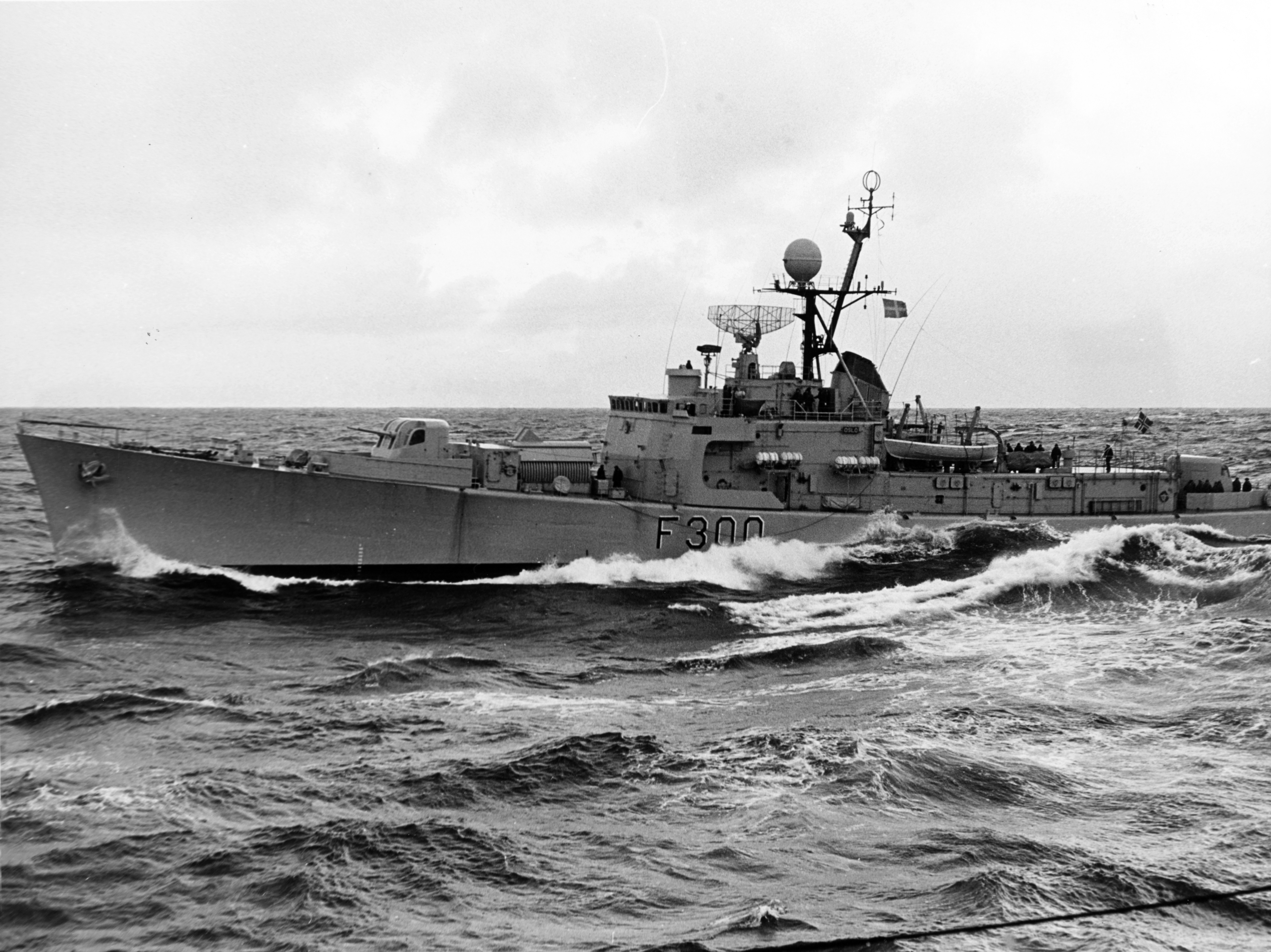
- Norwegian frigate Oslo in the North Atlantic, October 1971.

History

Norway
- Name: Oslo
- Namesake: Oslo
- Ordered: 1960
- Builder: Navy Main Yard, Karljohansvern, Horten, Norway
- Laid down: 1963
- Launched: 17 January 1964
- Commissioned: 29 January 1968
- Identification: F300
- Fate: Sunk 25 January 1994

General characteristics
- Class & type: Oslo-class frigate
- Displacement: 1,450 long tons (1,473 t) standard; 1,745 long tons (1,773 t) full load
- Length: 93.9 m (308 ft 1 in) pp.; 96.6 m (316 ft 11 in) ao.
- Beam: 11.2 m (36 ft 9 in)
- Draught: 5.3 m (17 ft 5 in)
- Propulsion: 2 × STAL-de Laval PN20 double reduction geared turbines; 1 × shaft, 20,000 shp (14,914 kW); 2 × Babcock & Wilcox boilers
- Speed: 25 knots (29 mph; 46 km/h)
- Range: 4,500 nautical miles at 15 knots (8,300 km at 28 km/h)
- Complement: 150
- Sensors & processing systems: Siemens/Plessey AWS-9 long range air search radar; Racal DeccaTM 1226 surface search radar in I band; Kongsberg MSI-90(U) tracking and fire control system; Raytheon Mk 95; I/J-band search and track radar for Sea Sparrow; Medium frequency Thomson-CSF Sintra/Simrad TSM 2633 combined hull and VDS active sonar; High frequency Terne III active sonar
- Electronic warfare & decoys: 4 × Mark 36 SRBOC chaff launchers ESM: AR 700 suite
- Armament: 2 × 3 in (76 mm) cannon; 1 × Bofors 40mm/70 anti-aircraft gun; 2 × 20 mm Rheinmetall anti-aircraft guns; 2 × 12.7 mm anti-aircraft guns; 6 × Penguin SSMs (usually not mounted); 1 × 8-cell Raytheon RIM-7M Sea Sparrow Mk 29 SAM system; 6 × Kongsberg Terne ASW rocket-thrown depth charges; 2 × triple 324 mm (12.8 in) Mark 32 torpedo tubes (Sting Ray torpedoes)

HNoMS Oslo (pennant number F300) was an Oslo-class frigate of the Royal Norwegian Navy. The frigate was launched on 17 January 1964, and commissioned on 29 January 1968. Oslo ran aground near Marstein Island on 24 January 1994. One officer was killed in the incident. The next day, on 25 January, she was taken under tow. However as the situation deteriorated, the tow was let go and the frigate sank.

== Design and description ==
The Oslo class was based on the American Dealey-class destroyer escorts with modifications for northern sea conditions, including more freeboard forward. Oslo was 93.9 metres (308 ft 1 in) long between perpendiculars and 96.6 metres (316 ft 11 in) long overall with a beam of 11.2 metres (36 ft 9 in) and a draught of 5.3 metres (17 ft 5 in). The ship had a standard displacement of 1,450 long tons (1,473 t) and was 1,745 long tons (1,773 t) at full load. (Note: Gardiner, Chumbley & Budzbon have the full load displacement as 1,760 long tons (1,790 t).) The frigate was powered by one set of STAL-de Laval PN20 double reduction geared turbines driving one shaft powered by steam provided by two Babcock & Wilcox boilers, rated at 20,000 shaft horsepower (14,914 kW). The ship had a maximum speed of 25 knots (46 km/h; 29 mph) and a range of 4,500 nautical miles (8,300 km; 5,200 mi) at 15 knots (28 km/h; 17 mph). Oslo was initially armed with four 3-inch (76 mm)/50 calibre guns mounted in twin turrets. (Note: The 50 calibre denotes the length of the gun. This means that the length of the gun barrel is 50 times the bore diameter.)

After a refit in the late 1970s Oslo mounted the two twin 3-inch mounts, six Penguin surface-to-surface missiles, one Mk 29 octuple launcher for Sea Sparrow surface-to-air missiles, carrying 24 missiles in total, and six Mk 32 324 mm (13 in) torpedo tubes in two triple mounts. The ship received her Mk 91 radar director for the Sea Sparrow missiles, and was fitted with DRBU 22, TM 1226 and HSA M 22 radars and SQS-36 sonar. In the late 1980s, Oslo underwent another modernisation. This time the aft twin 3-inch mount was removed to make space for the Teme III rocket-launched depth charges and 40 mm/70 calibre gun and Terne III and TSM 2633 hull and variable depth sonar and replacing the SQS-36. The frigate had a complement of 150 officers and ratings.

== Service history ==
The frigate was one of five authorised as part of the 1960 naval construction programme. Half the cost of the construction of the ship was borne by the United States. The ship was constructed by the Navy Main Yard, Karljohansvern in Horten, Norway, with the keel laid down in 1963. Named for the capital of Norway, the frigate was launched on 17 January 1964 as the lead ship of her class. Oslo was commissioned into the Royal Norwegian Navy on 25 January 1966.

=== Sinking ===
On 24 January 1994, Oslo ran aground near the Marstein Lighthouse. The frigate had suffered a boiler feed pump failure and drifted in heavy seas before running aground. On 25 January, the tugboat Lars began to tow the frigate. However, as the frigate's situation deteriorated and it was believed that Oslo would not make port, Lars released the tow and the frigate sank.

== Sources ==
- Gardiner, Robert; Chumbley, Stephen & Budzbon, Przemysław, eds. (1995). Conway's All the World's Fighting Ships 1947–1995. Annapolis, Maryland: Naval Institute Press. ISBN 1-55750-132-7.
- Sharpe, Richard, ed. (1990). Jane's Fighting Ships 1990–91 (93 ed.). Surrey, United Kingdom: Jane's Information Group. ISBN 0-7106-0904-3.
- "Frontispiece". Ships Monthly. Vol. 29. Endlebury Publishing Company. 1994. p. 35. ISSN 0037-394X.
