= HNoMS Bergen (F301) =

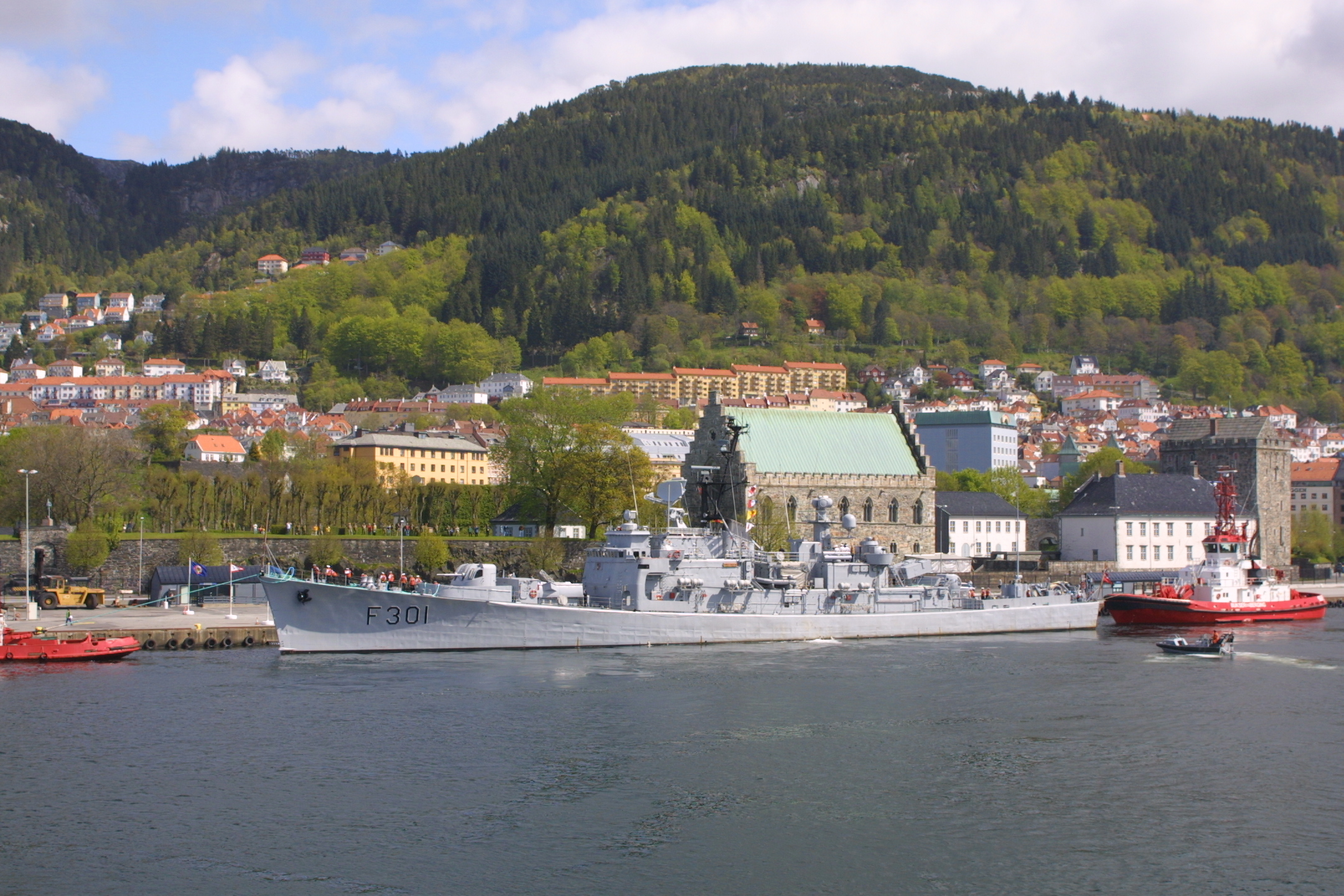
- Bergen in Bergen for the last time before being decommissioned in 2005

History

Norway
- Name: Bergen
- Ordered: 1960
- Builder: Marinens Hovedverft Horten
- Launched: 23 August 1965
- Commissioned: 22 June 1967
- Decommissioned: 3 August 2005
- Fate: Sunk as target ship in 2025

General characteristics
- Class & type: Oslo-class frigate
- Displacement: 1,450 long tons (1,473 t) standard; 1,745 long tons (1,773 t) full load
- Length: 96.6 m (316 ft 11 in)
- Beam: 11.2 m (36 ft 9 in)
- Draft: 5.5 m (18 ft 1 in)
- Propulsion: Twin steam boilers, one high pressure and one low pressure steam turbine, 20,000 hp (14,914 kW)
- Speed: 25 knots (29 mph; 46 km/h)
- Range: 4,500 nautical miles at 15 knots (8,300 km at 28 km/h)
- Complement: 120 (129 max) officers and men
- Sensors & processing systems: Siemens/Plessey AWS-9 long range air search radar; Racal DeccaTM 1226 surface search radar in I band; Kongsberg MSI-90(U) tracking and fire control system; Raytheon Mk 95; I/J-band search and track radar for Sea Sparrow; Medium frequency Thomson-CSF Sintra/Simrad TSM 2633 combined hull and VDS active sonar; High frequency Terne III active sonar
- Electronic warfare & decoys: 4 × Mark 36 SRBOC chaff launchers ESM: AR 700 suite
- Armament: 2 × 3 in (76 mm) cannon; 1 × Bofors 40mm/70 anti-aircraft gun; 2 × 20 mm Rheinmetall anti-aircraft guns; 2 × 12.7 mm anti-aircraft guns; 6 × Penguin SSMs (usually not mounted); 1 × 8-cell Raytheon RIM-7M Sea Sparrow Mk 29 SAM system; 6 × Kongsberg Terne ASW rocket-thrown depth charges; 2 × triple 324 mm (12.8 in) Mark 32 torpedo tubes (Sting Ray torpedoes)

HNoMS Bergen (pennant number F301) was an Oslo-class frigate of the Royal Norwegian Navy.

She was launched on 23 August 1965, and commissioned on 22 June 1967. She was decommissioned on 3 August 2005 and broken up in March 2013 at Svolvaer.

HNoMS Bergen was decommissioned in June 2005 and replaced by HNoMS Fridtjof Nansen. Its final voyage was a visit to Oslo during the centennial celebration of the dissolution of the union between Norway and Sweden. The vessel was subsequently used as an office building at Haakonsvern naval base. In September 2007, the ship was towed to Ramsund Naval Base to be used as a target ship.

In September 2025, she was sunk off Andøya by a Joint Direct Attack Munition delivered from a B-2 bomber.
