= Oslo-class frigate =

Royal Norwegian Navy ships (1966–2007)

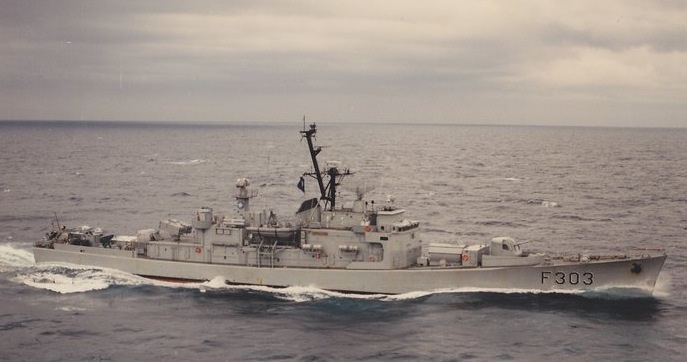
- Stavanger

Class overview
- Name: Oslo class
- Builders: Navy Main Yard, Karljohansvern, Horten, Norway
- Operators: Royal Norwegian Navy
- Preceded by: River class
- Succeeded by: Fridtjof Nansen class
- Built: 1964–1966
- In commission: 1966–2007
- Completed: 5
- Lost: 1
- Retired: 3
- Preserved: 1

General characteristics
- Type: Frigate
- Displacement: 1,735 long tons (1,763 t) standard; 2,100 long tons (2,134 t) full load
- Length: 96.6 m (316 ft 11 in)
- Beam: 11.2 m (36 ft 9 in)
- Draft: 5.5 m (18 ft 1 in)
- Propulsion: Twin steam boilers, one high pressure and one low pressure steam turbine, 20,000 hp (14,914 kW)
- Speed: 25 knots (46 km/h; 29 mph)
- Range: 3,900 nmi (7,200 km; 4,500 mi) at 15 kn (28 km/h; 17 mph)
- Complement: 120 (129 max) officers and men
- Sensors & processing systems: Siemens/Plessey AWS-9 long range air search radar; Racal DeccaTM 1226 surface search radar in I band; Kongsberg MSI-90(U) tracking and fire control system; Raytheon Mk 95; I/J-band search and track radar for Sea Sparrow; Medium frequency Thomson-CSF Sintra/Simrad TSM 2633 combined hull and VDS active sonar; High frequency Terne III active sonar
- Electronic warfare & decoys: 4 × Mark 36 SRBOC chaff launchers ESM: AR 700 suite
- Armament: 2 × 3 in (76 mm) cannon; 1 × Bofors 40mm/70 anti-aircraft gun; 2 × 20 mm Rheinmetall anti-aircraft guns; 2 × 12.7 mm anti-aircraft guns; 6 × Penguin SSMs (usually not mounted); 1 × 8-cell Raytheon RIM-7M Sea Sparrow Mk 29 SAM system; 6 × Kongsberg Terne ASW rocket-thrown depth charges; 2 × triple 324 mm (12.8 in) Mark 32 torpedo tubes (Sting Ray torpedoes)

The Oslo-class frigate is a Royal Norwegian Navy frigate design of the 1960s, based on the US Navy Dealey-class destroyer escorts. The forward hull was customized to suit Norwegian sea conditions better (higher freeboard) and several sub-systems were European built. Ships of the class operated until 2007, when they were replaced by the Fridtjof Nansen class.

== Construction ==
All ships were built at the Navy Main Yard in Horten, Norway between 1964 and 1966. The construction of the vessels was part of the Navy rebuilding program, approved by the Norwegian government in 1960. Half of the project expenses were funded by the United States as a part of the Mutual Defense Assistance Program (MDAP) (a program that ran from when it was passed by the Congress in October 1949 until 1967–68).

== Modernization ==
In the late 1970s, the class received new armament, most notably Penguin, RIM-7 Sea Sparrow and Mark 32 torpedo launchers. Another modernization was carried out in the 1980s.

During 1995 and 1996, after HNoMS Oslo experienced an engine failure, and subsequently sank after sailing in heavy weather, the rest of the class was once again modernized. The hulls were strengthened, which in turn increased the displacement with 200 tonnes.

All of the Oslo class are now retired, with HNoMS Narvik preserved as a museum ship. The Oslo class were replaced by the Fridtjof Nansen-class frigates. This replacement started in mid-2006.

== Ships ==
Five frigates of this class were built. All of them were modernized during the period 1987–1990. They bear the prefix KNM (Kongelig Norske Marine, meaning Royal Norwegian Navy) in Norwegian and HNoMS (His Norwegian Majesty's Ship) in English.

Name	Pennant number	Launched	Commissioned	Decommissioned
Oslo	F300	17 January 1964	29 January 1966	Sank in 1994
Bergen	F301	23 August 1965	22 June 1967	3 August 2005
Trondheim	F302	4 September 1964	2 June 1966	June 2006
Stavanger	F303	4 February 1966	8 December 1967	June 1998
Narvik	F304	8 January 1965	30 November 1966	1 August 2007

=== Oslo ===
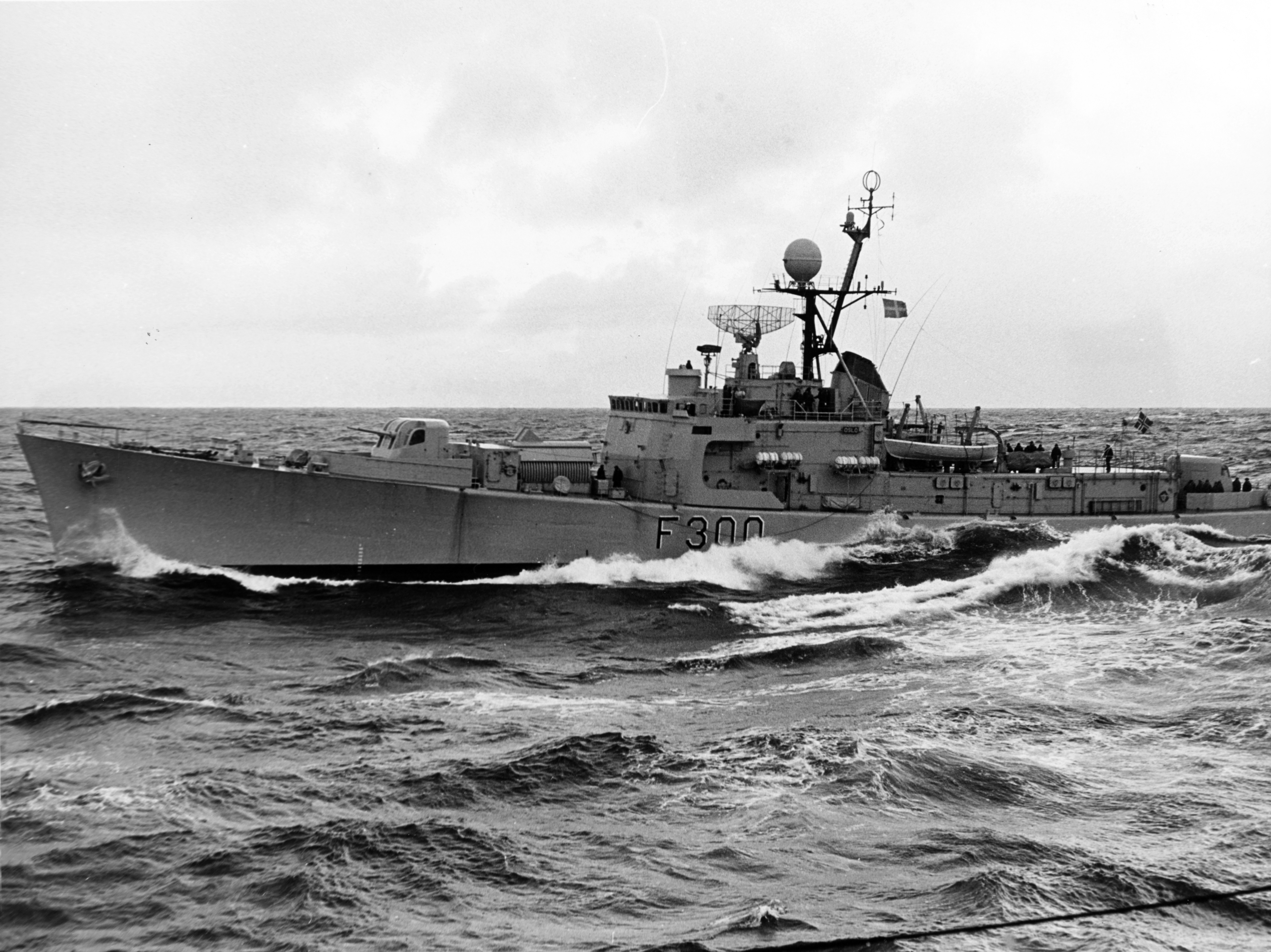
Oslo in the North Atlantic, October 1971

The lead ship, Oslo, ran aground near Marstein island on 24 January 1994. One officer was killed in the accident. The next day, on 25 January, she was taken under tow. She sank on the same day in Korsfjorden outside Steinneset in Austevoll Municipality.

=== Stavanger ===
Stavanger was decommissioned in 1998. She was later used for target practice and sunk in 2001 by a single DM2A3 torpedo launched from the Ula-class submarine Utstein (S 302).

=== Bergen ===
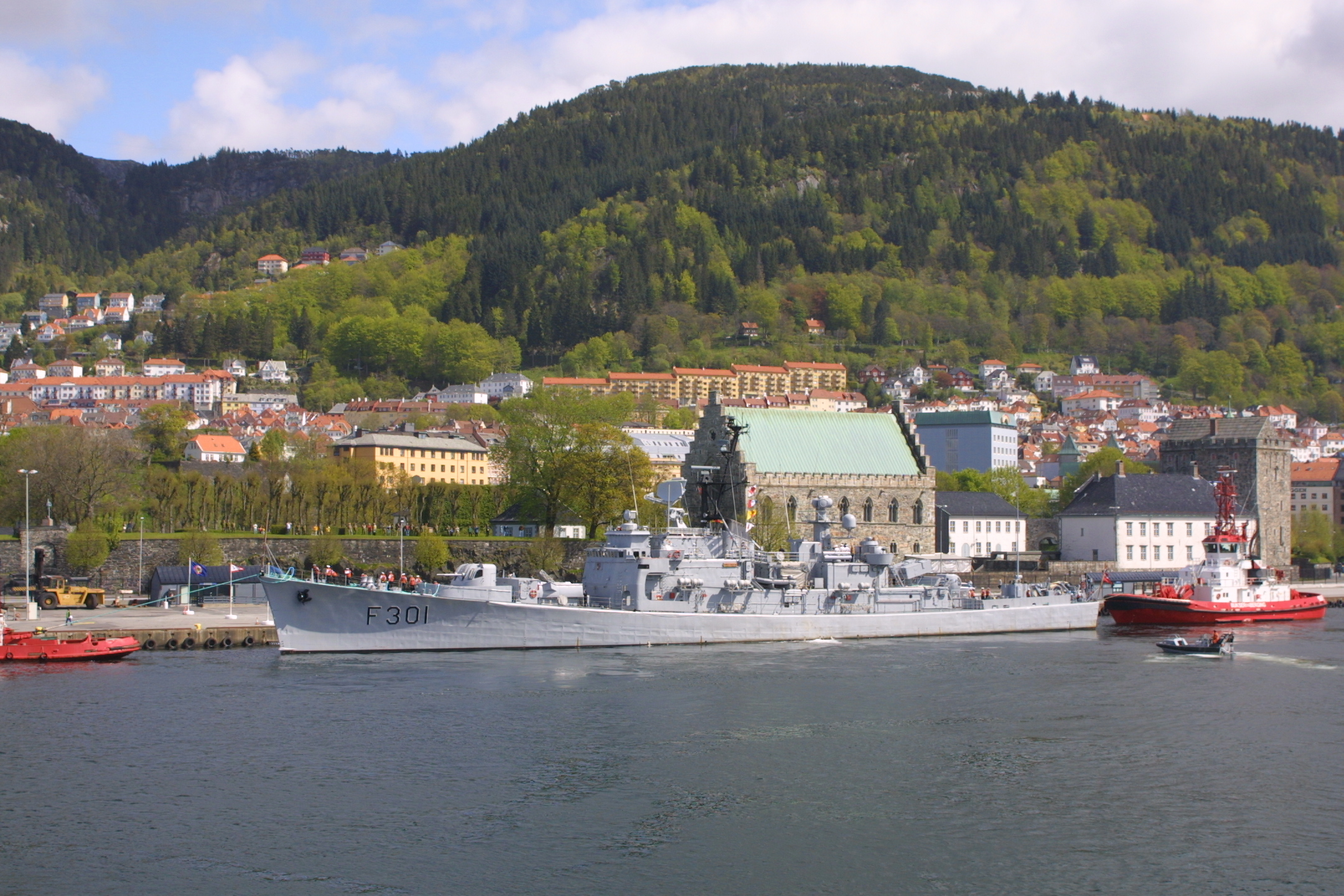
Bergen in its namesake city for the last time before being decommissioned in 2005.

Bergen was decommissioned in August 2005. In September of 2025, she was sunk by a QUICKSINK bomb dropped from a B-2 Stealth bomber.

=== Trondheim ===
On 17 March 2006 at 20:10 CET, Trondheim ran aground off Lines island in Sør-Trøndelag. No injuries among the 121-man crew were reported. The incident was reported from the ship itself, and at 20:30 it came loose again. Water flooded two compartments (paint storage and forward pump room) of the ship. The compartments were sealed and three ships were sent to assist the frigate. The frigate was towed to port in Bergen by the coast guard vessel NoCGV Tromsø.

HNoMS Trondheim was used after decommissioning as a target ship. On 5 June 2013, she was severely damaged in a test of the Norwegian-designed Naval Strike Missile system off the coast of the island of Andøya.

In September of 2025, she was sunk alongside HNoMS Bergen. She was struck by a torpedo launched from the Ula-class submarine Uthaug.

=== Narvik ===
Narvik, the last active ship of the class, has been transferred to the Royal Norwegian Navy Museum in Horten.

== See also ==
- List of Royal Norwegian Navy ships
- List of frigate classes by country

=== Equivalent frigates of the same era ===
- Garcia class
- Köln class
- Leander class
- Bronstein class
- João Belo class
- Commandant Rivière class
- Tribal class
