= HNoMS Narvik (F304) =

Norwegian navy frigate

Coordinates: 59.429638°N 10.479761°E

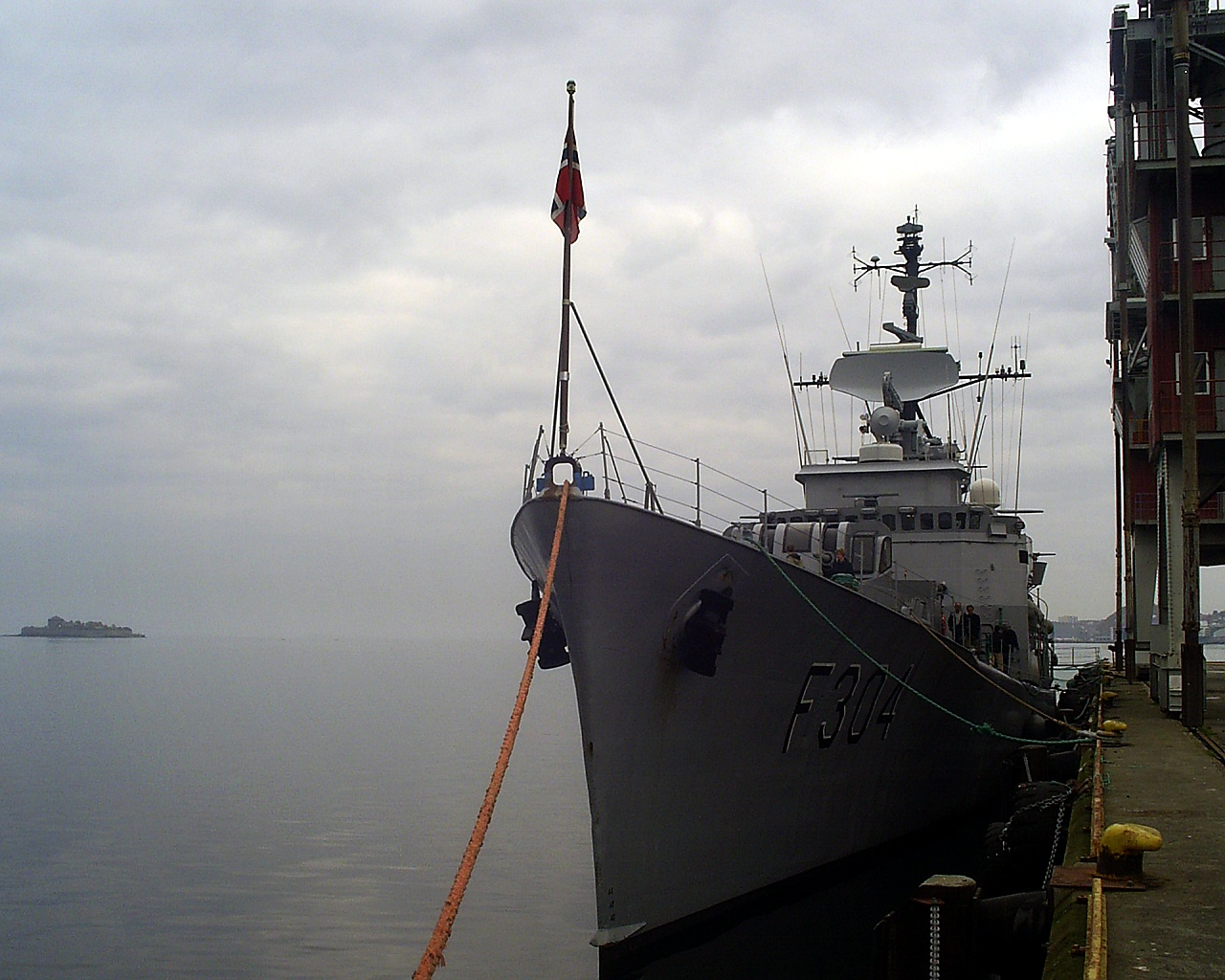
- Norwegian frigate Narvik (F304).

History

Norway
- Name: Narvik
- Ordered: 1960
- Launched: 8 January 1965
- Commissioned: 30 November 1966
- Decommissioned: 1 August 2007
- Identification: F304
- Fate: transferred to the Royal Norwegian Navy Museum in Horten

General characteristics
- Class & type: Oslo-class frigate
- Displacement: 1,450 long tons (1,473 t) standard; 1,745 long tons (1,773 t) full load
- Length: 96.6 m (316 ft 11 in)
- Beam: 11.2 m (36 ft 9 in)
- Draft: 5.5 m (18 ft 1 in)
- Propulsion: Twin steam boilers, one high pressure and one low pressure steam turbine, 20,000 hp (14,914 kW)
- Speed: 25 knots (29 mph; 46 km/h)
- Range: 4,500 nautical miles at 15 knots (8,300 km at 28 km/h)
- Complement: 120 (129 max) officers and men
- Sensors & processing systems: Siemens/Plessey AWS-9 long range air search radar; Racal DeccaTM 1226 surface search radar in I band; Kongsberg MSI-90(U) tracking and fire control system; Raytheon Mk 95; I/J-band search and track radar for Sea Sparrow; Medium frequency Thomson-CSF Sintra/Simrad TSM 2633 combined hull and VDS active sonar; High frequency Terne III active sonar
- Electronic warfare & decoys: 4 × Mark 36 SRBOC chaff launchers ESM: AR 700 suite
- Armament: 2 × 3 in (76 mm) cannon; 1 × Bofors 40mm/70 anti-aircraft gun; 2 × 20 mm Rheinmetall anti-aircraft guns; 2 × 12.7 mm anti-aircraft guns; 6 × Penguin SSMs (usually not mounted); 1 × 8-cell Raytheon RIM-7M Sea Sparrow Mk 29 SAM system; 6 × Kongsberg Terne ASW rocket-thrown depth charges; 2 × triple 324 mm (12.8 in) Mark 32 torpedo tubes (Sting Ray torpedoes)

HNoMS Narvik (pennant number F304) was an Oslo-class frigate of the Royal Norwegian Navy.

Narvik, the last active ship of the class, was transferred to the Royal Norwegian Navy Museum in Horten in 2007.
