= HNoMS Bergen =

At least two ships of the Royal Norwegian Navy have been named HNoMS Bergen, after the city of Bergen:

- HNoMS Bergen (1946), a C-class destroyer purchased from the Royal Navy in 1946 and broken up in 1967.
- HNoMS Bergen (F301), an Oslo-class frigate commissioned in 1967 and decommissioned in 2005.
