= Kongsberg Geospatial =

Software company in Canada

- Industry: Defence and Aerospace, Software
- Founded: 1992
- Headquarters: Ottawa, Ontario, Canada
- Area served: Global
- Key people: Jordan Freed (President) Tanya Hume (VP Finance and Admin) Paige Cutland (VP Sales & Marketing)
- Products: TerraLens (formerly InterMAPhics) Midas IRIS UAS
- Number of employees: 47
- Parent: Kongsberg Gruppen, Kongsberg Defense & Aerospace
- Website: https://www.kongsberggeospatial.com
- Footnotes [Citations Needed]

Kongsberg Geospatial is a software company based in Ottawa, Ontario, Canada. Founded in 1992 as Gallium Visual Systems Inc., it was acquired by Kongsberg Gruppen & Aerospace in 2006. It currently operates as a subsidiary of Kongsberg Defence & Aerospace and in 2012, officially changed its name to Kongsberg Gallium Ltd. The company was known as Kongsberg Gallium before adopting the name Kongsberg Geospatial in 2016.

== Partnership ==
In 2019, Kongsberg Geospatial and AiRXOS entered into a partnership concerning automated and unmanned traffic management systems.

In May 2020, Kongsberg Geospatial, Larus Technologies, and the Civil Air Search and Rescue Association of Canada (CASARA) collaborated on the use of drones in search-and-rescue operations in rural areas of Canada. The collaboration involved geospatial tools, artificial intelligence, and computer vision software.
