= Royal Norwegian Navy Museum =

Museum in Horten, Norway

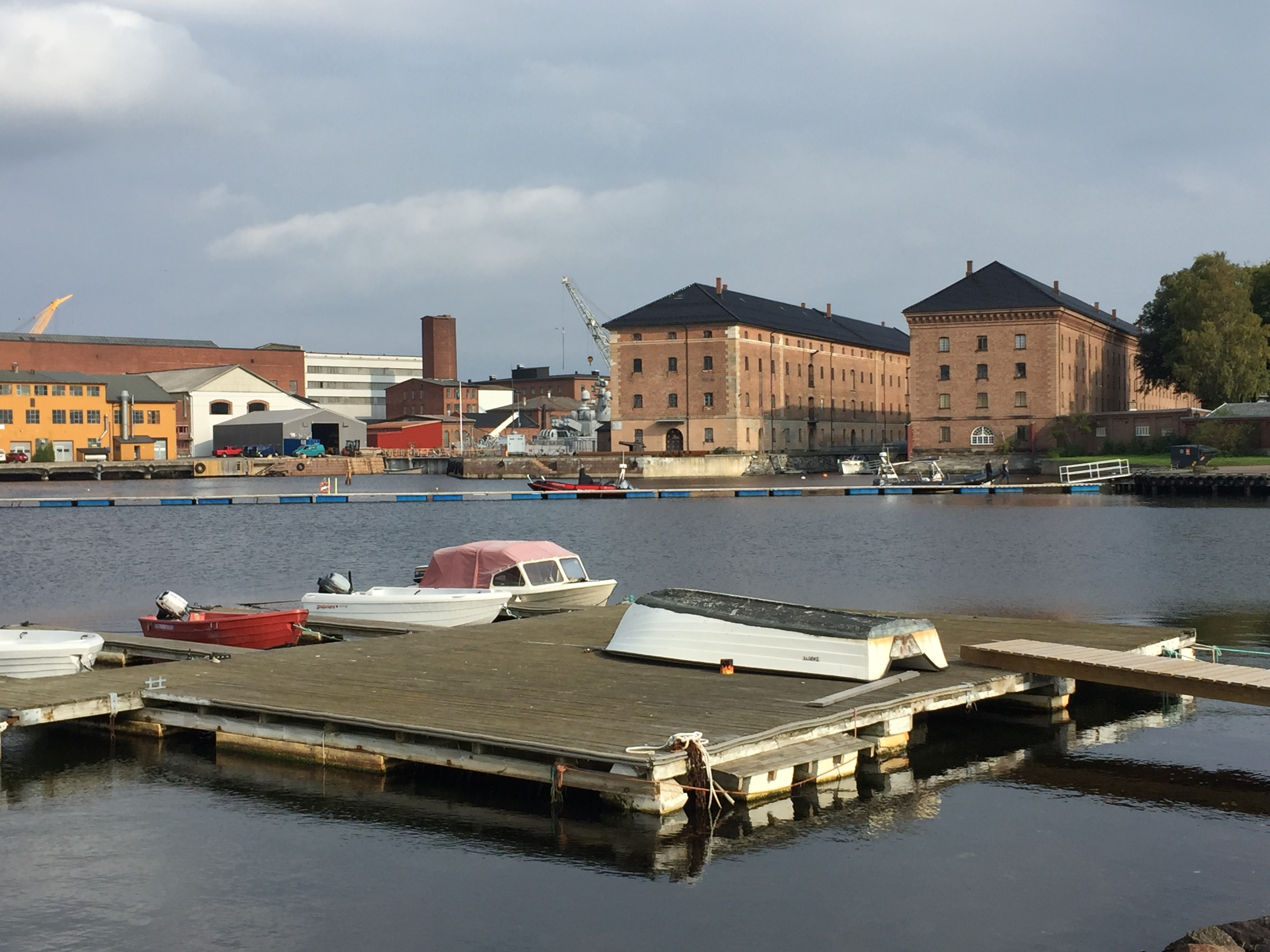
- Established: August 24, 1853
- Location: Former main naval base of Karljohansvern in Horten
- Coordinates: 59°25′32″N 10°29′13″E
- Key holdings: First collection of naval memorabilia open to the public
- Collections: Decommissioned ships; equipment used by the Norwegian, Allied and German navies; ship models, paintings and pictures
- Founder: C.F. Klinck

The Royal Norwegian Navy Museum (Norwegian: Marinemuseet) is a museum documenting the history of the Royal Norwegian Navy. It is located at the former main naval base of Karljohansvern in Horten. The museum was founded by C.F. Klinck on 24 August 1853. The museum is sometimes regarded as the world's first naval museum, as it was the first collection of naval memorabilia open to the public.

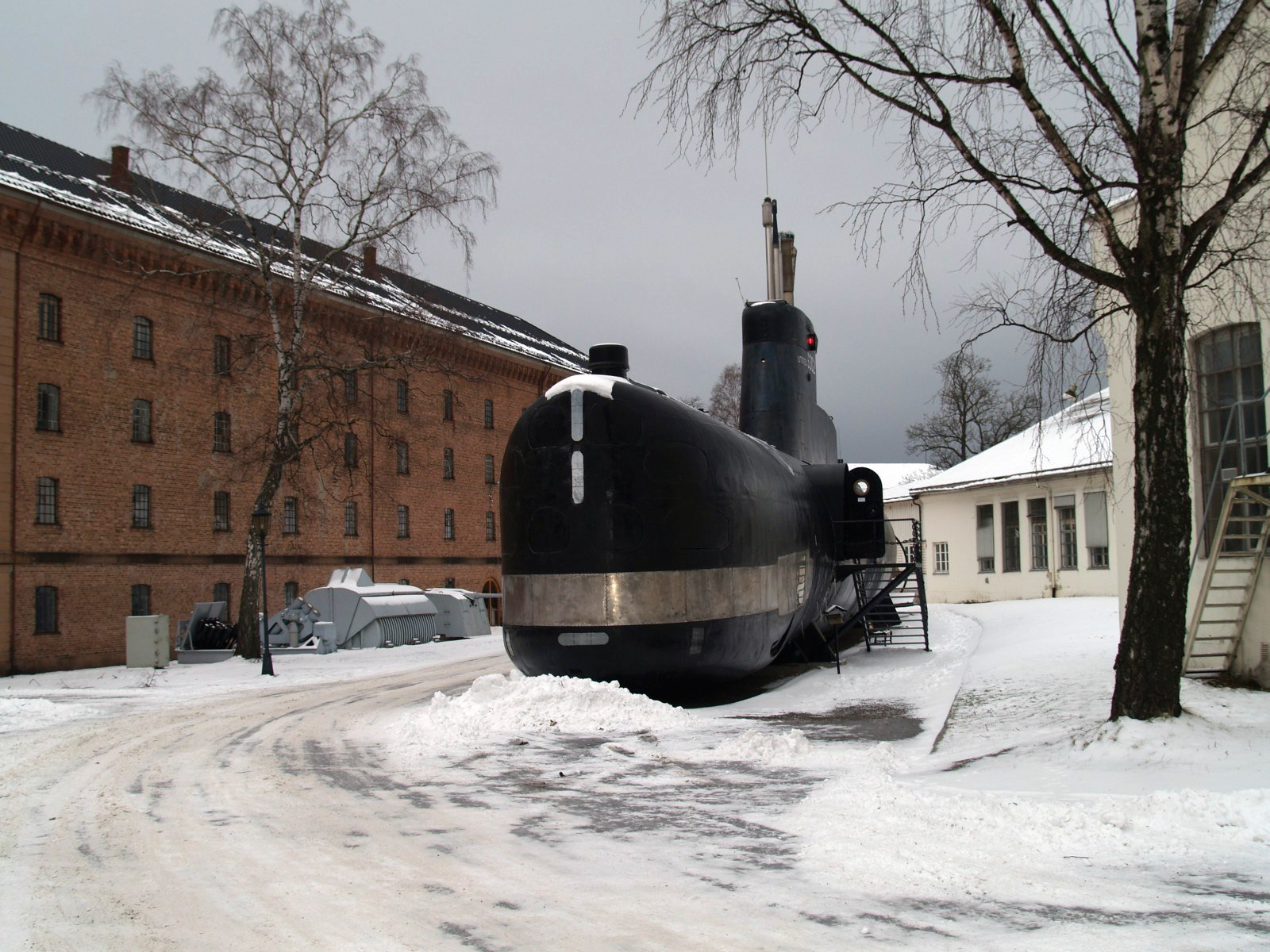
The submarine HNoMS Utstein outside the Royal Norwegian Navy Museum

== The collection ==
The collection contains several decommissioned ships, much equipment used by the Norwegian, Allied and German navies and ship models, paintings and pictures. In the 1980s the Royal Norwegian Navy Library was transferred to the museum. The library's book collection started in 1805. The Museum and Library have a book collection of about 25,000 volumes. In addition the museum has preserved all of the navy's ship log books from 1814 to today. Parts of the Museum was however destroyed during an allied bombing raid on Horten in February 1945. The museum also preserves ship designs and has an archive of Navy rules and regulations from about 1750 to today, with about 4,500 volumes.

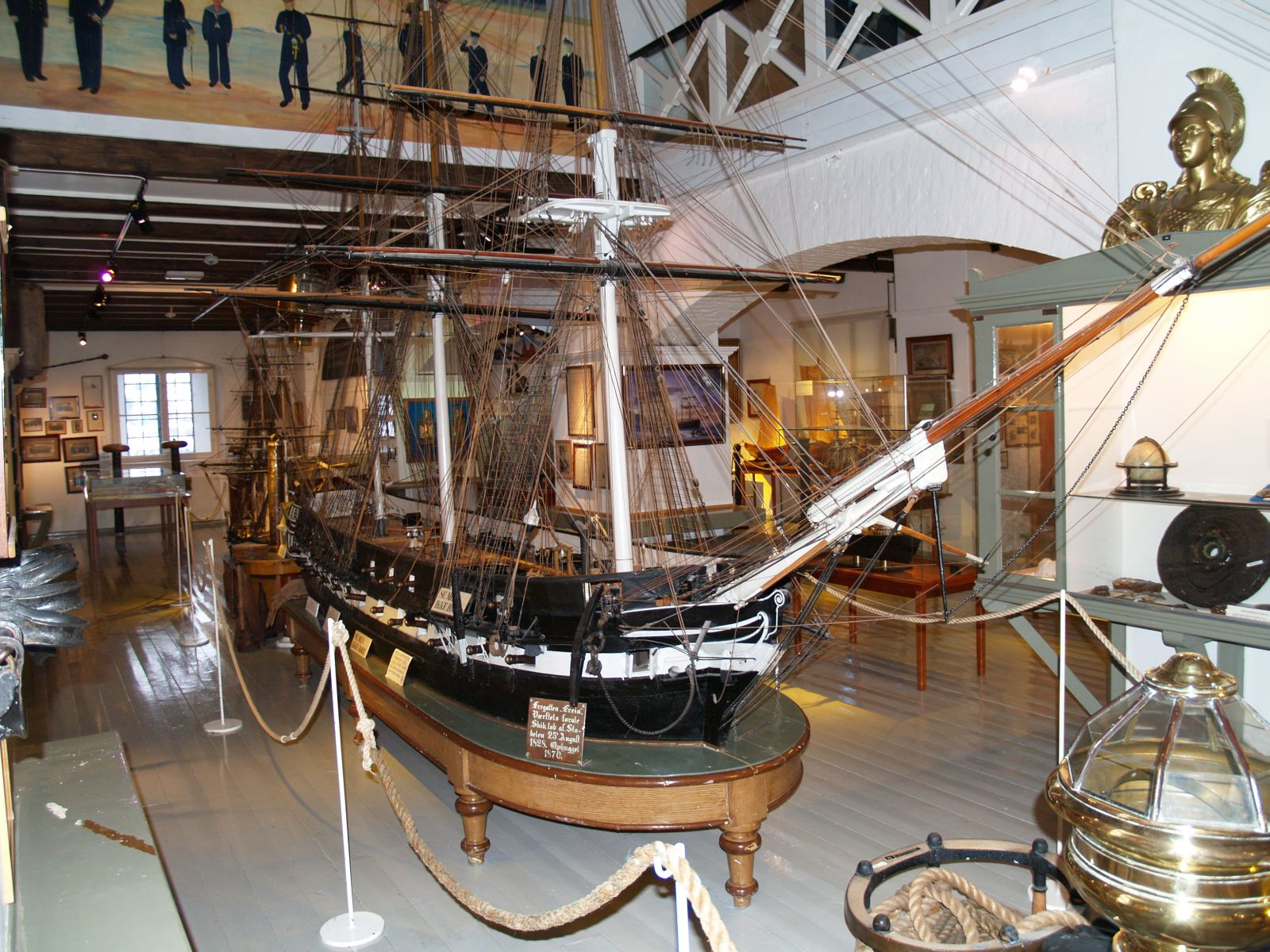
A section of the Navy Museum exhibitions, with a model of the frigate Freia

== The ships ==
- HNoMS Alta — a Sauda class minesweeper still sailing and based in Oslo.
- HNoMS Blink — a Storm class patrol boat, at 59.426°N 10.48672°E
- HNoMS Hitra (ex USN SC‑718) — a "Shetland bus" still sailing and based in Bergen.
- HNoMS Narvik — an Oslo class frigate.
- HNoMS Rap — the world's first torpedo boat.
- HNoMS Skrei — a Tjeld class patrol boat.
- HNoMS Utstein — a Kobben class submarine.

== See also ==
- Bamse (St. Bernard) - World War II naval dog honoured at the museum
