= HNoMS Fridtjof Nansen =

There have been several ships in the Royal Norwegian Navy named after the Norwegian explorer and Nobel Peace Prize winner Fridtjof Nansen.

- HNoMS Fridtjof Nansen (1930) – patrol vessel from 1931.
- Fridtjof Nansen-class frigate – a new class of Aegis frigates from 2005.
  - HNoMS Fridtjof Nansen (F310) lead ship of the class.

== See also ==
- MS Fridtjof Nansen, a cruise ship
