= Ula-class submarine =

Submarine type within the royal Norwegian navy

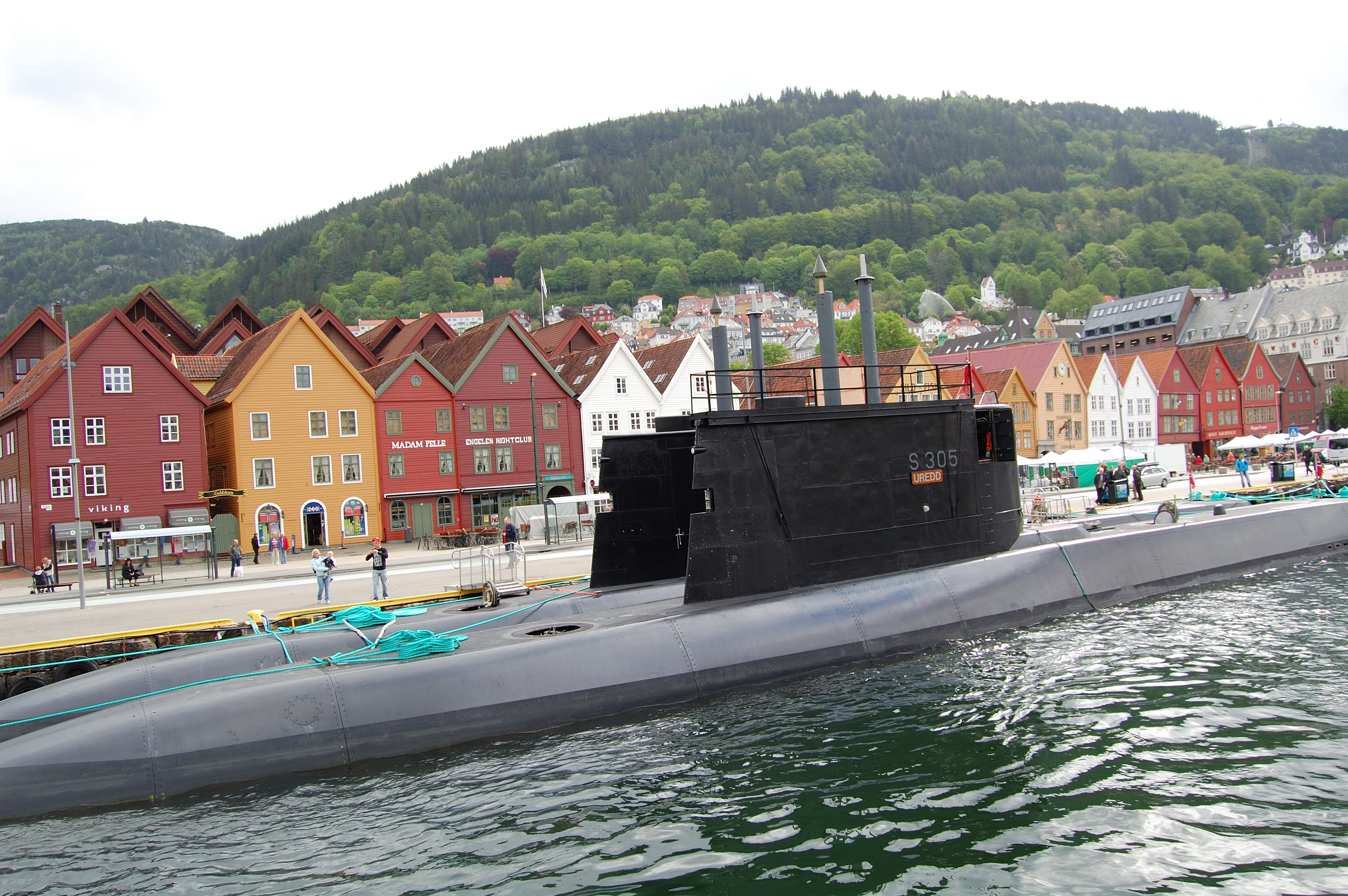
- Ula-class submarines

Class overview
- Name: Ula class
- Operators: Royal Norwegian Navy
- Preceded by: Kobben class
- Succeeded by: Æger class
- Built: 1987–1992 (in Germany)
- In commission: April 1989 – present
- Completed: 6

General characteristics
- Type: Submarine
- Displacement: Surface: 1,040 tons; Submerged: 1,150 tons
- Length: 59 m (193 ft 7 in)
- Beam: 5.40 m (17 ft 9 in)
- Draft: 4.60 m (15 ft 1 in)
- Propulsion: Diesel-electric; 2 MTU 16V 396 diesel engines (970kW each); 1 propeller. 1 Siemens Permasyn "silent" electric motor 2,200 kW (3,000 hp).
- Speed: Surface: 11 knots (20 km/h; 13 mph); Submerged: 23 knots (43 km/h; 26 mph)
- Range: 5,000 nmi (9,300 km; 5,800 mi) at 8 knots (15 km/h; 9.2 mph)
- Test depth: 200 m (656 ft)+
- Complement: 21
- Sensors & processing systems: Radar: Kelvin Hughes 1007 Surface Search; Sonar: Atlas Elektronik CSU83; Thomson Sintra flank array
- Armament: 8 bow 21 in (533 mm) torpedo tubes; 14 Atlas Elektronik DM2A3 torpedoes
- Notes: Unit cost: 700,000,000 NOK;

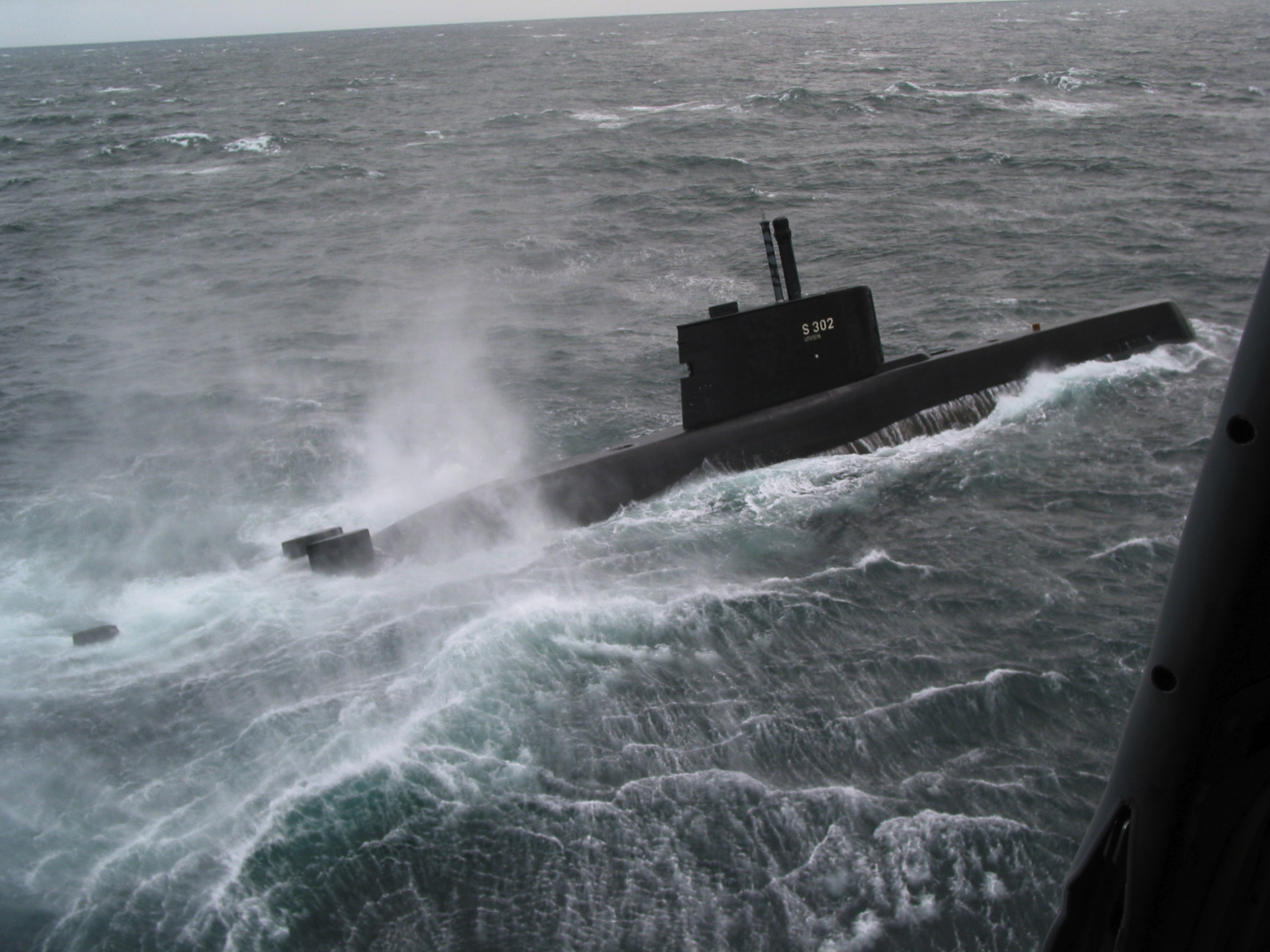
Utstein participating in the exercise Odin-One in August 2003

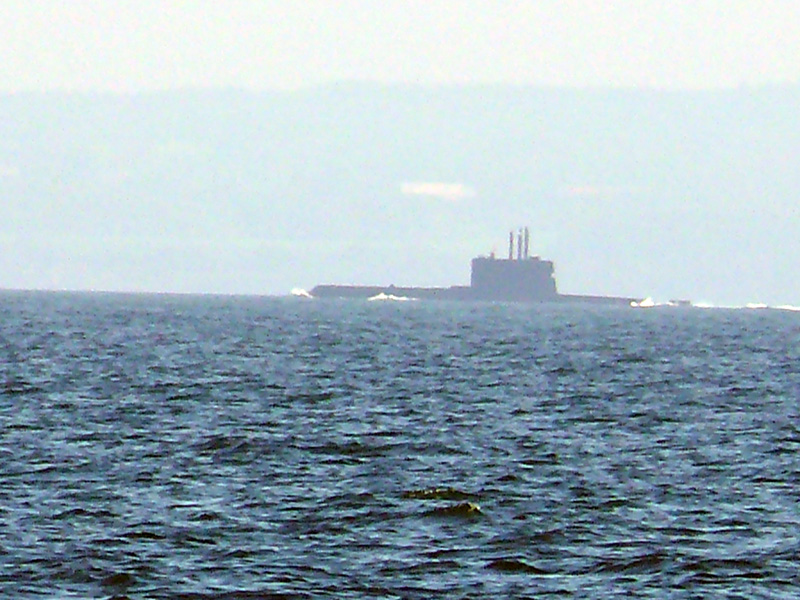
An Ula-class submarine near Bornholm Island, Baltic Sea in March 2007

The Ula class is a Norwegian submarine type which was assembled in Germany in the late 1980s and early 1990s. The class, consisting of six vessels, is currently the only submarine type in service with the Royal Norwegian Navy.

== History ==
The ordering of a new Norwegian submersible design stemmed from a 1972 decision to modernise the Royal Norwegian Navy (RNoN) submarine flotilla, which then consisted of the aging Kobben-class submarines. The contract was signed on 30 September 1982 for six boats with Thyssen Nordseewerke, Emden. An option for two more submarines was included in the original deal, however, it was never picked up.

The construction of the vessels was an international project. The combat systems were made in Norway by Kongsberg, the attack sonar is German and the flank sonars French. The hull sections were produced in Norway and assembled in Germany by Thyssen Nordseewerke. In Germany, the design is known as the U-Boot-Klasse 210.

When commissioned, the Ulas were the first Norwegian submarines to have enough bunks for the entire crew and a shower.

The Ula-class submarines are among the most silent and maneuverable submarines in the world. This, in combination with their relatively small size, makes them difficult to detect from surface vessels and ideal for operations in coastal areas. The Ula class is regarded as both the most effective and cost-effective weapons in the RNoN.

== Ship history ==
In 1989, while undergoing trials, Ula was damaged by a practice torpedo. In March 1991, Uredd was involved in an accident while docking. In February 1992, Uredd suffered a control room fire.

In recent years, several submarines of the Ula class have been deployed in the Mediterranean Sea in support of the NATO Operation Active Endeavour, where their intelligence-gathering ability surpassed expectations. Their operational availability proved to be highest of all ships taking part in the operation. This mission highlighted a need for better temperature regulation for crew comfort in warm waters. As a result, HNoMS Ula was "tropicalized" by the installation of new cooling systems, and two more of the class designated for "tropicalization".

== Modernisation ==
During 2006-2008 the Ula class was slated for modernisation. Most notably, new communication equipment (Link 11), new electronic warfare support measures and a periscope upgrade. In May 2008, a contract for new sonars was signed, with the first submarine to have new sonar 21 months after that, and the last 52 months later. Furthermore, Kongsberg was contracted in 2012 to upgrade the submarines' combat systems. The 2020 long-term defence plan envisages the Ula class being kept in service until replaced by the new Type 212CD submarines in around 2030.

In September 2024 it was reported that the combat systems of the six Ula class submarines will be updated again by Kongsberg Defense and Aerospace. The following month, in October 2024, it was also reported that Hensoldt had completed a critical design review for the modernisation of the six boats, which includes the installation of a new periscope and optronic mast systems.

== Replacement ==
In 2012 the Norwegian MoD set 2014 as a deadline for deciding whether to further extend the operative life of the Ula class after their slated end-of-life in 2020, or to replace them with a new fleet. In December 2014, the Norwegian Ministry of Defence made the decision to begin the process of replacing the Ulas. As part of that decision, the Ula-class submarines would be kept in service for a further five years, but would not exceed 35 years total service as that would be too costly. Given the delay in replacing the Ula-class, it was subsequently decided to further life-extend the Ula-class through the 2020s until a new class of submarines entered service.

In 2016, two suppliers (DCNS and Thyssen Krupp) were shortlisted to provide competing options to replace the Ula-class boats. In February 2017, Thyssen Krupp was selected to provide four replacement submarines based on the Type 212-class for service entry in around 2030. A firm build contract had been anticipated in the first half of 2020. However, as of the end of 2020, the contract had not yet been signed. In March 2021 it was indicated that an agreement had been reached between Norway and Germany to initiate the acquisition program, pending approval by the Bundestag. The contract was signed in July 2021 and construction of the first vessel began in September 2023. Delivery of the first boat to the Royal Norwegian Navy is anticipated in 2029.

== Vessels ==
Six submarines were delivered (1989–1992) to the RNoN. All are based at Haakonsvern in Bergen. The boats are all named after places in Norway, with the exception of Uredd ("Fearless" in English), in honour of the World War II submarine HNoMS Uredd (P-41). The ship prefix for RNoN vessels is KNM (Kongelig Norsk Marine, Royal Norwegian Navy), in English HNoMS (His Norwegian Majesty's Ship).

=== Vessel list ===
Ula class
#	Name	Laid down	Launched	Commissioned	Status
S 300	HNoMS Ula	29 January 1987	28 July 1988	27 April 1989	Active
S 301	HNoMS Utsira	15 June 1990	21 November 1991	30 April 1992	Active
S 302	HNoMS Utstein	6 December 1989	25 April 1991	14 November 1991	Active
S 303	HNoMS Utvær	8 December 1988	19 April 1990	8 November 1990	Active
S 304	HNoMS Uthaug	15 June 1989	18 October 1990	7 May 1991	Active
S 305	HNoMS Uredd	23 June 1988	22 September 1989	3 May 1990	Active

== See also ==
- List of submarine classes in service
- Viking-class submarine - new Scandinavian submarine abandoned in 2004

Equivalent submarines of the same era

- Västergötland class
- Shishumar class
- Jang Bogo class
