= Terne ASW =

Terne III Mk8
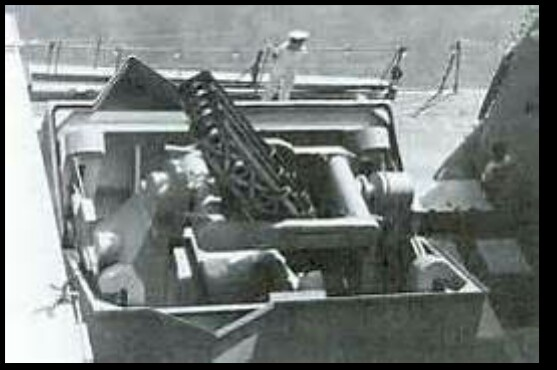
- Terne III Mk.8 ASW system opening its clam gate
- Type: Anti-submarine rocket

Service history
- In service: 1964

Production history
- Manufacturer: Kongsberg Defence & Aerospace and A/S Raufoss
- Produced: 1950 (Terne I)

Specifications
- Mass: 135 kg
- Length: 1.95 m
- Diameter: 0.21 m
- Wingspan: 0.24 m
- Warhead: 50 kg
- Detonation mechanism: Delay Fuse
- Engine: Solid-fueled Rocket; 52 kN (11700 lb)
- Operational range: 425-1600 m
- Guidance system: Unguided rocket + depth charge
- Launch platform: Land and Naval ships

Terne is a Norwegian anti-submarine rocket system, which uses rocket-thrown depth charges. It was developed by the Norwegian Defence Research Establishment (FFI) in cooperation with the U.S. Navy in the late 1940s-early 1960s. The Terne development project consisted of three phases:

Terne I : Development of a rocketborn depth charge.

Terne II: Development and construction of a landbased ASW for naval defense.

Terne III: Development and construction of a shipborne ASW.

A Terne III weapon system consists of a search & track sonar, a fire-control system and the rocket launchers, which can store six salvos of six rockets each. The rocket itself, is a depth charge with multiple fusing modes (preset time after water entry, proximity, or contact), which is propelled through the air by a solid-fueled rocket motor. When the sonar detects a target, the fire-control system can fire a rocket salvo to place a string of depth charges 18 m (20 yd) apart, perpendicular to the target's course.

== User countries ==
- United States (Phased out)
- Germany (Phased out)
- Norway (Phased out)

== See also ==
- Anti-submarine warfare
