= Penguin (missile) =

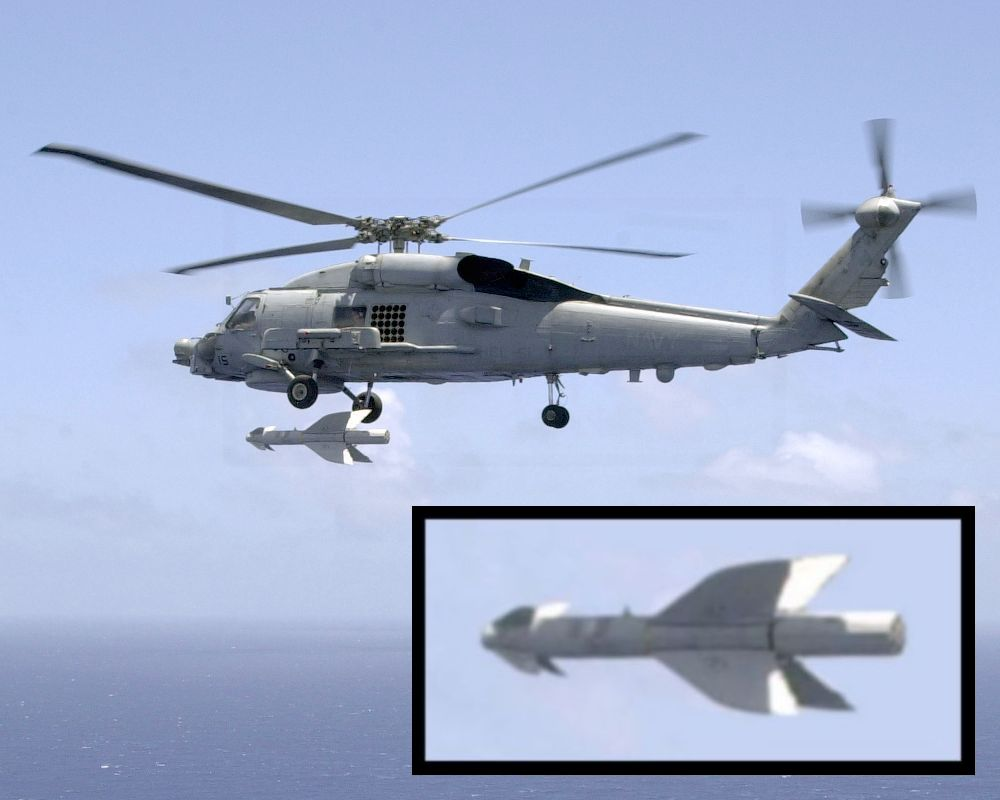
- A U.S. Navy SH-60B Seahawk helicopter fires an AGM-119 missile off the coast of Okinawa, Japan, in July 2002.
- Type: littoral anti-ship missile
- Place of origin: Norway

Service history
- In service: 1972–present

Production history
- Manufacturer: Kongsberg Defence & Aerospace

Specifications
- Mass: 385 kg (849 lb) (MK2), 370 kg (820 lb) (MK3)
- Length: 3.0 m (MK2), 3.2 m (MK3)
- Diameter: 28 cm
- Wingspan: 1.4 m (MK2), 1.0 m (MK3)
- Warhead: 120 kg (MK2), 130 kg (MK3)
- Detonation mechanism: delay fuze
- Engine: Solid propellant sustainer
- Operational range: 34+ km (MK2), 55+ km (MK3)
- Flight altitude: sea skimming
- Maximum speed: high subsonic
- Guidance system: pulse-laser, passive IR (MK2), passive IR, radar altimeter (MK3)
- Launch platform: naval ships, helicopters (MK2), fixed-wing aircraft (MK3)

The Penguin anti-ship missile, designated AGM-119 by the U.S. military, is a Norwegian passive IR seeker-based short-to-medium range anti-ship guided missile, designed for naval use.

== Overview ==
Penguin was originally developed in a collaboration between the Norwegian Defence Research Establishment (NDRE; Norw. FFI) and Kongsberg Våpenfabrikk starting in the early 1960s, with financial support from the U.S. and West Germany. US Navy test facilities and technical assistance were made available to facilitate development. It was the first NATO anti-shipping missile with an IR seeker instead of the commonly used active radar seeker. Both hardware and software have been updated since entering series production in 1972.

Initial installation was in 500-kilogram (1,100 lb) deck-mounted box launchers with snap-open doors. These were designed for minimal deck intrusion, allowing them to be retrofitted to existing small ships. The first such installations were on Snøgg-class and Storm-class patrol boats of the Norwegian Navy. The first airborne installations were on F-104Gs of the Norwegian Air Force, the missiles being fitted to standard Bullpup rails on the two underwing hardpoints.

Fire-control was provided by a Kongsberg SM-3 computer which could cue the missiles based on either active radar or passive ESM data.

The Penguin can be fired singly or in coordinated-arrival salvoes. Once launched the launching craft is free to turn away as the missile is inertially guided until the autonomous terminal homing phase. Propelled by a solid rocket engine, latest variants of Penguin can perform random weaving manoeuvres at target approach and strike the target close to the waterline. It can perform a terminal bunt and weave manoeuvre. The 120-kilogram (260 lb) warhead (originally based on that of the AGM-12 Bullpup, built under license by Kongsberg) detonates inside the target ship by using a delay fuze. The MK3, when launched from high altitudes, can initially act as a glidebomb, only firing its rocket engine to extend range, or ideally to achieve maximum speed before hitting the target; for better penetration.

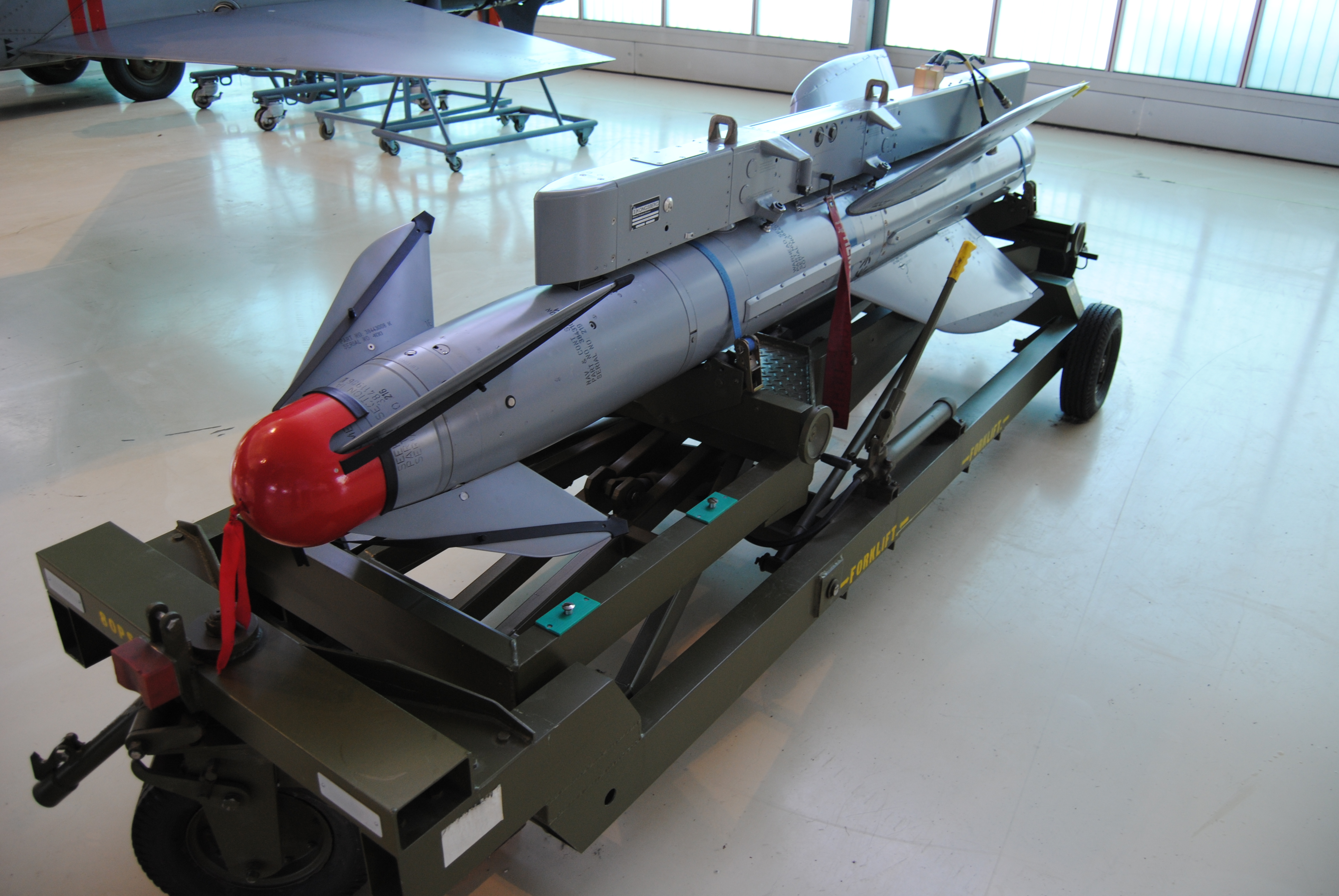
Penguin MK3 (missile) displayed in the Norwegian Armed Forces Aircraft Collection

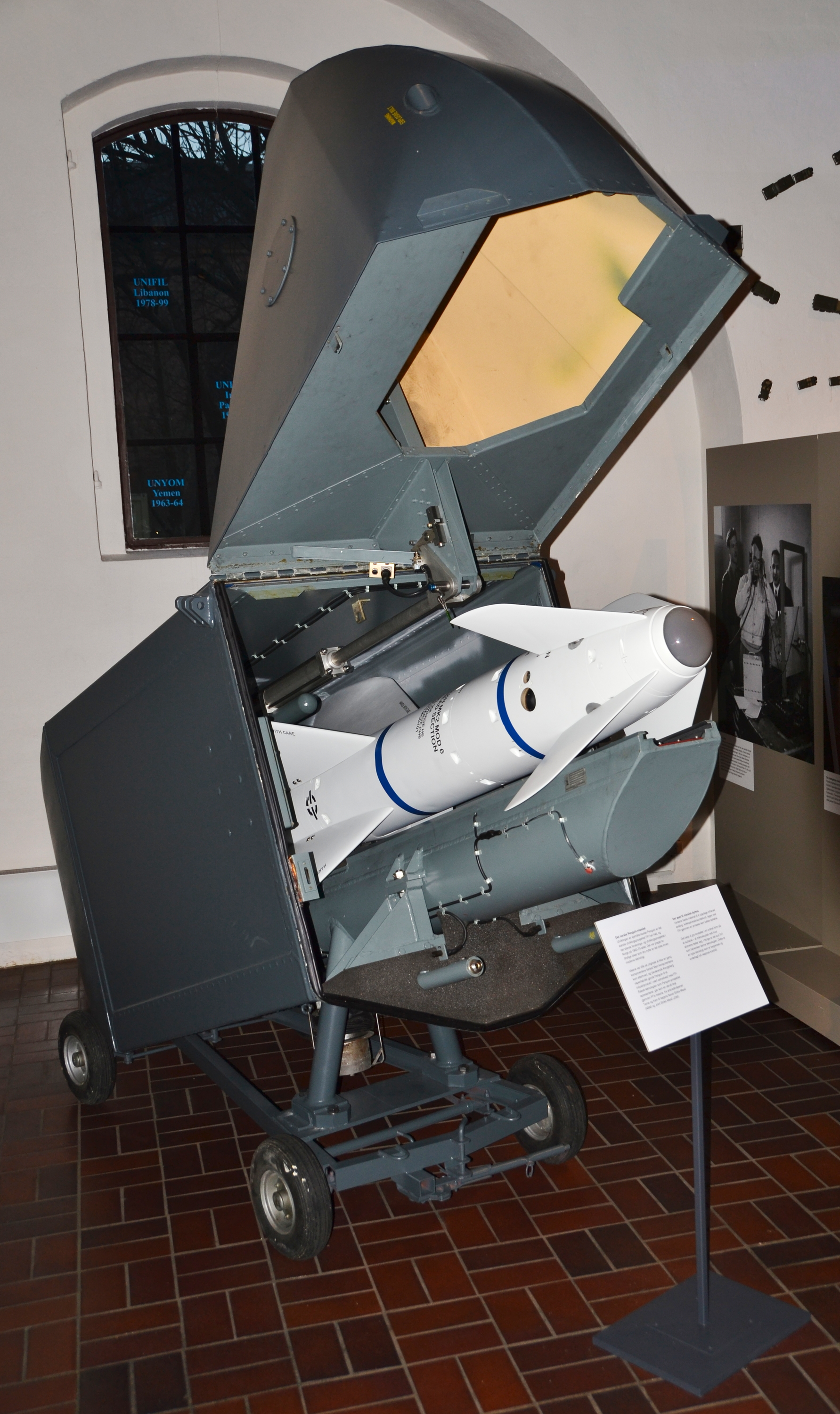
A Penguin MK2 mod 6 of the Norwegian Navy with its launch canister

In its various versions, the Penguin can be launched from a number of different weapons platforms:

- Surface vessels: Missile boats (its initial application) as well as larger ships
- Fighter aircraft: certified for F-16
- Helicopters (certified for the following aircraft):
  - Bell 412 SP
  - Kaman SH-2 Seasprite / Kaman SH-2G Super Seasprite
  - Sikorsky SH-60 Seahawk/MH-60 Seahawk
  - Westland Super Lynx

KDA's successor to the Penguin is the Naval Strike Missile (NSM), offered from 2007 onwards. NSM features an imaging IR-seeker, GPS navigation, a turbojet sustainer engine (for much longer ranges, 185 kilometres [115 mi] or more), and significantly more computer performance and digital signal processing power.

Penguin missiles were donated to Ukraine in May 2022.

== Operators ==
Kongsberg Defence & Aerospace (KDA) stated in November 2022 that Penguin Mk 2 mod 7 was in service in Brazil, Greece, New Zealand, Spain and Turkey and had been phased out by the US Navy.

=== Current ===
Penguin launched by a Brazilian Navy S-70B, 2024

- Brazil: Acquired for use in Brazilian Navy's S-70B helicopters at a cost of €33 million.
- Greece: In service with the Hellenic Navy (since 1980)
- New Zealand: In service with the Royal New Zealand Navy's purchased Royal Australian Navy's cancelled Super Seasprite helicopters, including Penguin Mk 2 Mod 7 missiles and simulator.
- Spain: In service with the Spanish Navy (since 2003)
- Turkey: In service with the Turkish Navy (since 1972)
- Ukraine: In service with the Armed Forces of Ukraine since 2022 as part of foreign military aid delivered due to the 2022 Russian invasion of Ukraine

=== Former ===
- Norway: Was in service with both the Royal Norwegian Navy (since 1972) and Royal Norwegian Air Force (since 1989)
- Sweden: Was in service with the Swedish Navy from 1980, as Robot 12. Taken out of service in 2005. In storage. Set to be replaced.
- United States: Was in service with the United States Navy as the AGM-119 (since 1994)
