= Kongsberg Defence & Aerospace =

Norwegian defense company

- Type: Business unit of Kongsberg Gruppen
- Industry: Military
- Founded: 1814; 212 years ago
- Headquarters: Kongsberg, Norway
- Area served: Global
- Key people: Eirik Lie (President)
- Revenue: ▲NOK 7,530 million (2012)
- Operating income: ▲NOK 1,036 million (2012)
- Number of employees: ▲3,500 (2021)
- Parent: Kongsberg Gruppen
- Website: www.kongsberg.com

Kongsberg Defence & Aerospace (KDA) is one of three business units of Kongsberg Gruppen (KONGSBERG) of Norway and a supplier of defence and space related systems and products, mainly anti-ship missiles, military communications, and command and weapons control systems for naval vessels and air-defence applications. Today, the company is probably best known abroad for its development/industrialisation and production of the first passive IR homing anti-ship missile of the western world, the Penguin, starting delivery in the early 1970s (when Kongsberg Defence & Aerospace was part of KONGSBERG's predecessor Kongsberg Våpenfabrikk). As of 2021, Kongsberg Defence & Aerospace had 3,500 employees.

Space related activities are conducted within Kongsberg Defence & Aerospace's Space & Surveillance division and Kongsberg Satellite Services. Notable space related products from Kongsberg Defence & Aerospace are the Booster Attachment and Release Mechanisms for ESA's Ariane 5. In the early 1990s, Kongsberg Defence & Aerospace was involved with NASA's JPL and Germany's DASA in software development of the test/checkout system, as well as spacecraft hardware production, for the NASA/ESA Cassini–Huygens space probe. Kongsberg Defence & Aerospace has also delivered the Solar Array Drive Mechanism for ESA's Rosetta space probe.

On 22 November 2008, Norwegian Minister of Defence Anne-Grete Strøm-Erichsen opened a new Kongsberg Defence & Aerospace plant that will produce parts for the aircraft recently chosen as Norway's future fighter, the F-35 Lightning II.

Kongsberg Defence & Aerospace has expanded its presence in the commercial space sector through a $12 million strategic investment in SpinLaunch, supporting the development and commercialization of the Meridian Space low Earth orbit (LEO) broadband satellite constellation. As part of this partnership, Kongsberg NanoAvionics was chosen as the exclusive supplier for the initial deployment, securing a €122.5 million contract to deliver 280 microsatellites and two prototypes, including an in-orbit demonstrator planned for 2026.

The collaboration highlights Kongsberg’s commitment to innovative, sustainable satellite communications, with the Meridian constellation expected to deliver significantly higher broadband capacity than current market offerings and enable rapid, large-scale deployment using advanced launch technology.

== Owners and ownership in other companies ==
It is fully owned by Kongsberg Gruppen ASA (a company majority owned by Norway's government.)

Its subsidiaries are Kongsberg Spacetec AS, Kongsberg Hungaria Kft, Kongsberg Norcontrol AS, Kongsberg Defence Corp., Kongsberg Defence Oy, Kongsberg Defence Sp. Z.O.O., Kongsberg Gallium Ltd., and Kongsberg Defence Ltd. Co.

It owns 50% of Kongsberg Satellite Services AS, and 77% of Kongsberg NanoAvionics AUB.

In the summer of 2026 it acquired 90% of the shares in Zone 5 Technologies.

== Toshiba-Kongsberg affair ==
In 1987, Toshiba Machine, a subsidiary of Toshiba, was accused of illegally selling CNC milling machines used to produce very quiet submarine propellers to the Soviet Union in violation of the CoCom agreement, an international embargo on certain countries to COMECON countries. The Toshiba-Kongsberg scandal involved a subsidiary of Toshiba and the Norwegian company Kongsberg Vaapenfabrikk. The incident strained relations between the United States and Japan, and resulted in the arrest and prosecution of two senior executives, as well as the imposition of sanctions on the company by both countries.

== Products ==
=== Air defence systems ===
- NASAMS (National Advanced Surface-to-Air Missile System, generations 1, 2 and 3) – a network centric short to medium range air-defence system made of several elements, in collaboration with Raytheon:
  - FDC (Fire Distribution Center) – a command module for missile launch that can be used for surface-to-surface missile systems and for surface-to-air systems (NASAMS and NSM CDL). Slated to be used in the pan-European Freyja anti-ballistic missile system in 2027.
  - A radar AN/MPQ-64F1 Sentinel provided by Raytheon. The GhostEye radar will be the future radar of the NASAMS.
  - Missile launchers (for AIM-9X2 and AIM-120 AMRAAM, AIM-120 AMRAAM-ER).
    - Base launcher on a platform.
    - SLAMRAAM – a potential launcher for the NASAMS system.
- NOMADS (NatiOnal Maneuver Air Defence System)

=== Missile systems ===
- JSM (Joint Strike Missile) - an air-launched cruise missile, designed for fitting the F-35 bomb bay.
- NSM (Naval Strike Missile) - an anti-ship / land attack missile.
- NSM CDS (Coastal Defence System) - a coastal anti-ship system. It is composed of:
  - NSM missile.
  - FDC (Fire Distribution Center) - a command module for missile launch.
  - Missile launcher on trucks.
- Penguin – a passive heat seeking anti-ship missile

=== Weapon stations ===
- Protector
  - Protector RS4 – a remote weapon station for small and medium calibre weapons, with a potential for an ATGM.
  - Protector RS4 Low Profile – a remote weapon station for small calibre weapons.
  - Protector RS6 – a remote weapon station with a low-recoil 30mm calibre, a coaxial machine gun and a potential ATGM, designed for light armoured vehicles (such as JLTV, Mowag Eagle, Humvee)
  - Protector RT20 – a lightweight remote turret that can be armed with the Bushmaster II (30 mm) or the Bushmaster IV (40 mm) chain guns.
  - Protector RT40 (formerly known as MCT) – a remote turret that can be armed with the Bushmaster II (30 mm) or the Bushmaster IV (40 mm) chain guns.
  - Protector RT60 – an IFV optimised turret that can be armed with the Bushmaster II (30 mm) or the Bushmaster IV (40 mm) chain guns, a small calibre RCWS and 2 ATGM.

=== Combat systems ===
- C4ISR
  - NATO AGS (Alliance Ground Surveillance) – a system for storing, managing and disseminating joint ISR.
  - NOR DSAR (Norwegian Data Storage and Retrieval Services) – a system for dissemination, storage, archival and retrieval for Joint Intelligence, Surveillance and Reconnaissance data and information.
  - Odin Fire Support System – an artillery fire command and targeting system.
- Kongsberg ICS (Integrated Combat Solution) – a hardware / software digital networking system for land combat vehicle, improving the situational awareness, and providing C3I solutions.
- FDC (Fire Distribution Center) – a flexible command module for missile launch that can be used for surface-to-surface missile systems and for surface-to-air systems:
  - FDC Coastal Defence – system controlling the sensors and the weapons of the coastal NSM system.
  - NASAMS FDC – a FDC system adapted to the NASAMS air defence system.
  - BFDC (HAWK) – a FDC system adapted to the HAWK air defence system, controlling up to 2 firing sections, and capable of networking with other FDC in the battery.
  - FDC-S – system optimised for the control and coordination of SHORAD and V/SHORAD weapon systems.
  - GBADOC (Ground Based Air Defence Operation Center) – a GBAD C2 unit.
  - BOC (Battalion Operation Center) – used for the command of air-defence battalions (or other weapon systems).
  - FDC Precision Fires – system used by the army command to coordinate the air-space use for precision fire.
- NORTaC-C2IS – Norwegian C2 system for tactical army operations.
- Software for the E3A AWACS used by NATO in Europe.

=== Naval systems ===
- CMS (Combat Management System) – a system that can be used for submarines, OPV, frigates, coast guards.
- CNS (Combat Navigation System) – a system that can be used for submarines, OPV, frigates, coast guards.
- Submarine systems
  - MSI-90U / MSI-90U Mk2 – command and arms control for submarines.
  - CMS.
  - CNS.
  - SPS (Sonar Processing System) – sonar system for situational awareness (bottom mapping, mine-avoidance sonar).
  - Link.
  - Training systems.
- MSI 2005F – anti-submarine warfare systems for the Fridtjof Nansen-class frigate.
- Senit 2000 – command system for the Skjold-class corvette, the Hauk-class patrol boat.
- MMCM (Maritime Mine Counter Measures):
  - Minesniper Mk III – a lightweight and low cost remote controlled robot for mine verification and neutralisation (one shot).
  - MICOS C2 - command system for mine countermeasure vessels.
- Vanguard – a naval MUM-T system (manned-unmanned teaming).
- Training systems
  - K-Sim – a ship operation simulator
  - PROTEUS simulators – a vast list of training systems for all types of command, combat, weapon and sensor systems on military vessels (ships, submarines and even helicopters).
  - Interact (Integrated Naval Training Environment for Resource management And Crew Teamwork) – a system that connects all the Proteus and K-Sim aiming to create a complex simulating and training environment and prepare many scenarios.
- KAMP (Kongsberg Mission Planning) – tactical planning system for naval operations of the NH90.

=== Communications ===
- Communication systems, software, and encryption.
- InterCom DDS – a middleware application for secure communications.
- Multi Rolle Radio (MRR) – field radios

=== Sensors ===
- PHAROX – a modular multi sensor system used to detect, track and identify objects.
- MEOS antennas – low earth orbit tracking antennas.

=== Aviation & security ===
- Kongsberg Digital towers.

=== Aerospace ===
- Geospatial Technology for Defense Systems:
  - TerraLens – a geospatial software used with numerous aircraft, naval systems, missile systems, ground systems, unmanned systems.

== Products in development ==
=== Air defence systems ===
- NOMADS (National Manoeuvre Air Defence System) – a mechanised air defence system based on the ACSV G5. It uses some of the weapons and technologies of the NASAMS. It has been tested with the IRIS-T SLS missiles, but will likely be used with the AIM-9X missiles.

=== Missiles ===
- 3SM Tyrfing (Super Sonic Strike Missile) – a super sonic cruise missile for land-attack and anti-ship roles, primarily designed ships. The project is led by Kongsberg, with Diehl, MBDA Deutschland and Nammo as subcontractors.
- Variants of the NSM (Naval Strike Missile)
  - NSM-AL (Aircraft launched) – a variant wanted by the Spanish Navy for its fleet of NH90 HHSPN.
  - NSM-SL (submarine launched) – a variant wanted by the Spanish Navy for its S-80 Plus submarines and that might be selected by Germany and Norway on the Type 212CD.

== Gallery ==
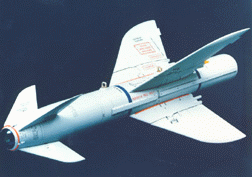
A Kongsberg Defence & Aerospace Penguin anti-ship cruise missile.

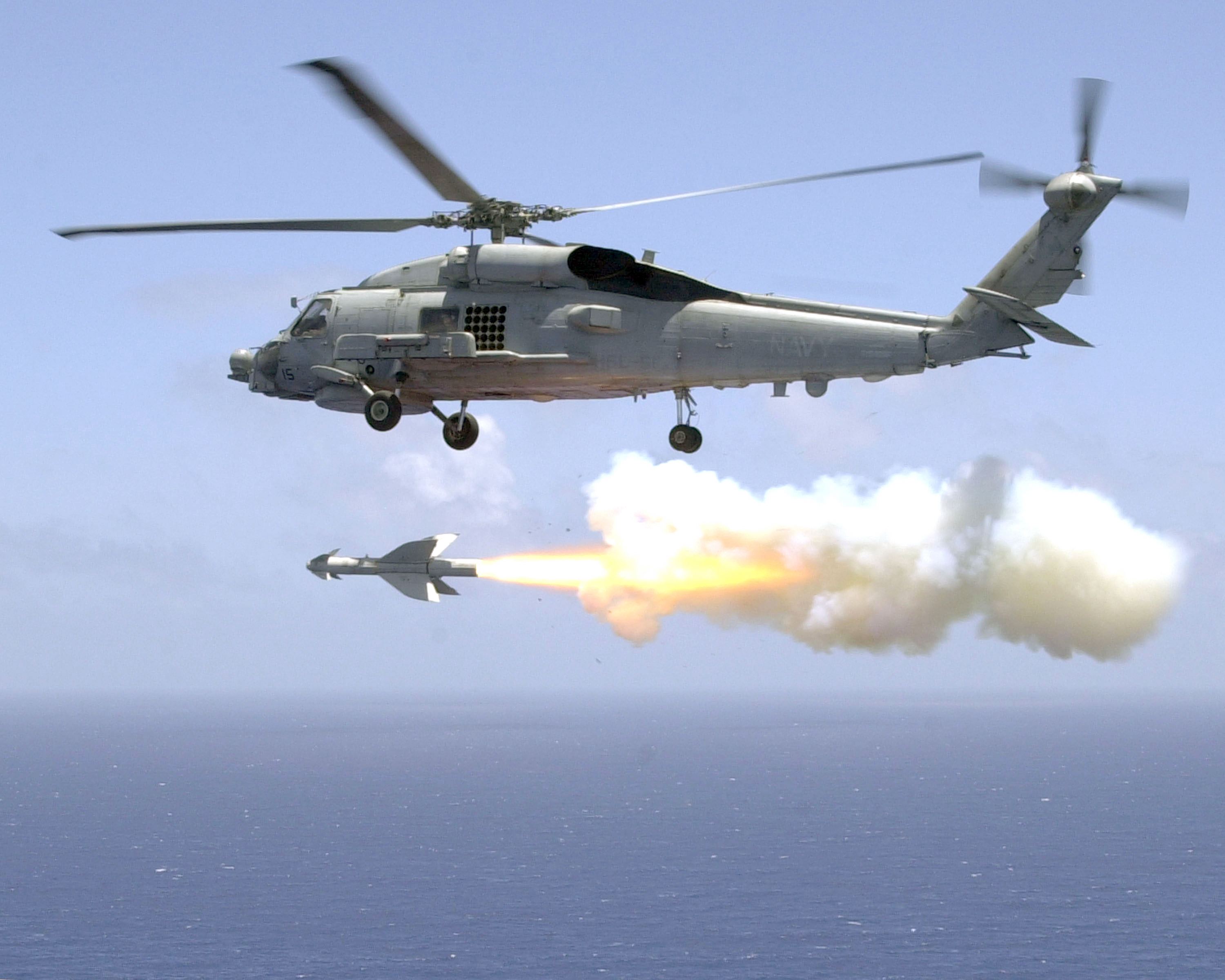
US Seahawk launching AGM-119 Penguin (2002)

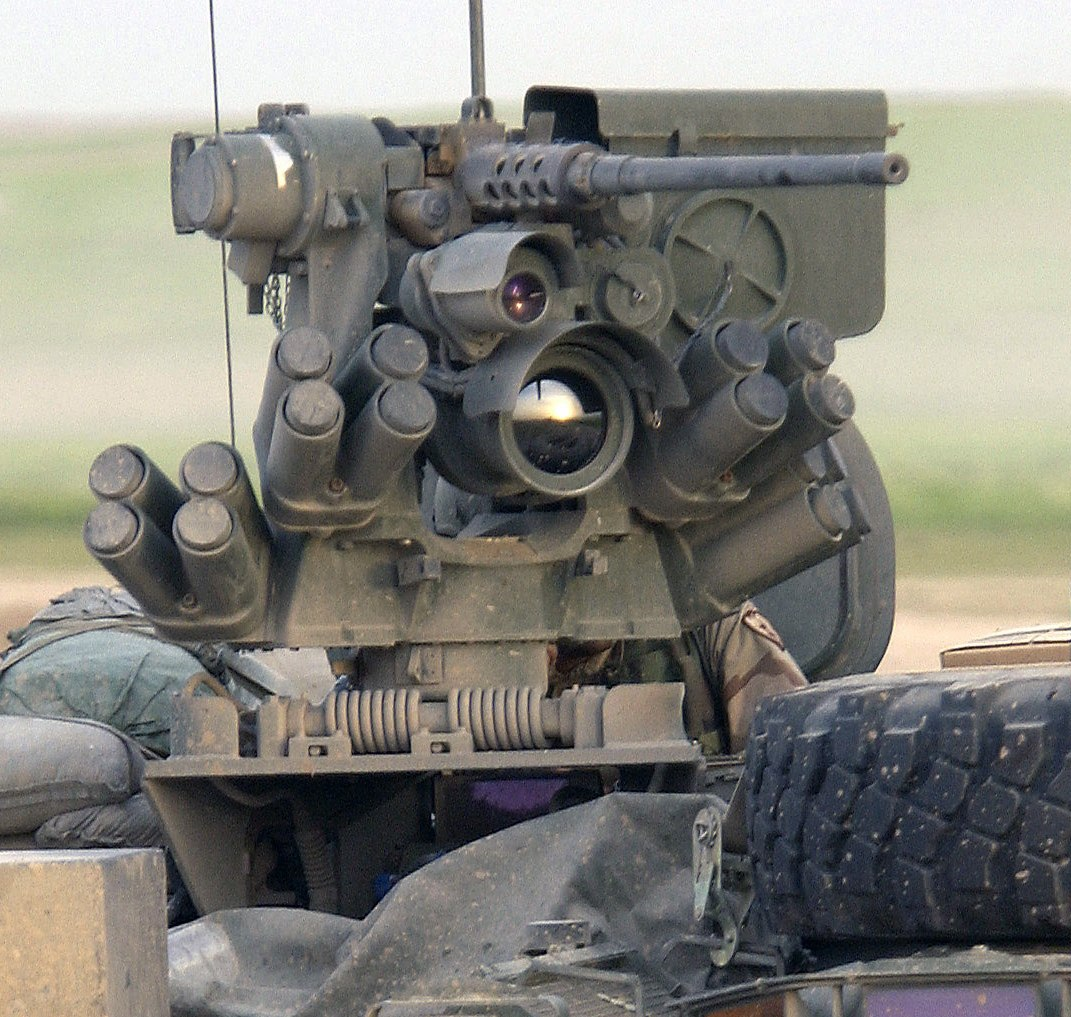
Protector RWS on top of an M1126 Stryker (2005)

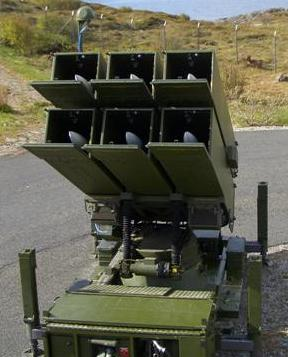
Norwegian NASAMS (2005)

== See also ==
- Aviation in Norway
