= Armorial of Norway =

This is an incomplete list of Norwegian coats of arms. Today most municipalities and all counties have their own coats of arms. Many Norwegian military units and other public agencies and some private families have coats of arms. For more general information see the page about Norwegian heraldry.

== National ==
=== Royal ===
Crowned escutcheon

Greater royal arms

Variant of the coat of arms used by the Storting since 2016

Emblem of the Royal House of Norway

=== Civilian agencies ===
==== Achievements including the royal arms ====
Armed Forces

Police Service

Border Police

Customs Service

State Railways (1923)

National Rifle Association

Telegraph Administration (1924)

==== Other ====
Coastal Administration

Maritime Authority

Royal Police Escort

Correctional Service

Directorate for fire and electricity safety (former)

Geological Survey of Norway

Ombudsperson for Children

Office for Victim Compensation

Joint Rescue Coordination Centres

Civil Defence (traditional)

Church of Norway

Governor of Svalbard

Governor of Svalbard (former)

Border Commissioner

==== Crowned emblems ====
Directorate of the State Forests (former)

Public Roads Administration

Polar Institute

Accreditation

Telegraph Administration (former)

Directorate for Product and Electrical Safety (former)

Directorate for Fire and Electrical Safety (former)

Directorate of Fisheries

Civil Defence

Post (traditional)

Petroleum Directorate (traditional)

Petroleum Directorate

Directorate of Mining

Directorate of Public Construction and Property

Water Resources and Energy Directorate (traditional)

Water Resources and Energy Directorate (1998-2017)

Water Resources and Energy Directorate

Air Traffic and Airport Management (former)

Prison Board (former)

== Military ==
=== Ministry of Defence ===
Royal Norwegian Ministry of Defence

Materiel Inspection Unit

Accident Investigation Board (former)

Committee for Assessment of Environmental Forces (former)

=== Norwegian defence sector ===
Defence Research Establishment

Defence Estates Agency

Defence Materiel Agency

Museum of Defense History

Museum of Defense History

Resistance Museum

Royal Norwegian Navy Museum

Agency for Classified Information Systems

National Security Authority

Parliamentary Ombudsman for the Norwegian Armed Forces

Former arms of the Norwegian defence sector

Defence Research Establishment

Defense Building Service

National Security Authority (2006-2018)

National Security Authority (2003-2006)

Military Prosecution Authority

=== Defence Staff ===
Armed Forces

Chief of Defence

Chief of Defence's Internal Auditing Unit

Defence Staff

Women in the Norwegian Armed Forces (former)

Network of Women in the Norwegian Armed Forces (cooperation agreement)

==== Joint Headquarters ====
Joint Headquarters

Joint Headquarters (proposed)

Regional Headquarters North Norway (former)

Regional Headquarters South Norway (former)

Defence Command North Norway (former)

Defence Command South Norway (former)

==== Joint Support Services ====
Joint Support Services

Norwegian Defence Security Department

Faith and Philosophy Corps

Financial Centre

Regulatory Body

Armed Forces Commandership

Oslo Garrison Management

Communication

Defence Magazine

Armed Forces Music

Royal Norwegian Navy Music

Royal Norwegian Fleet Music

Air Force Music Corps

Staff Music

Music of Northern Norway

Akershus Fortress

Commandant of Akershus Fortress

Bergenhus Fortress

Fredriksten Fortress

Karljohansvern Fortress

Commandant of Karljohansvern Fortress

Kongsvinger Fortress

Kristiansten Fortress

Commandant of Kristiansten Fortress

Oscarsborg Fortress

Vardøhus Fortress

Soldiers' Representative Group

Fire, Rescue and Airport Operation and Maintenance Forces

Former arms of the Joint Support Services

Field Priest Corps

Information Infrastructure

Joint Integrated Management System Administration

National Defense-Joint Material Service

Department of Culture and Tradition

School of Logistics

Competence Centre for Command, Control and Information Systems

Competence Centre for Driver Education

Joint Operations Security Institute

Regulatory Body

Fredriksten Fortress

Soldiers' Representative Group

==== Joint Medical Services ====
Joint Medical Services

Surgeon General of the Norwegian Armed Forces Joint Medical Services

Joint Medical Services Staff

Medical Regiment

Tactical Medical Forces

Medical School

Air Force Medical Institute

Veterinary Inspectorate

Joint Medical Forces (former)

==== HR and Conscription Centre ====
HR and Conscription Centre

Veterans' Affairs Division

Salary and Pay Office

Welfare Service

Military Sport

Personnel Services (former)

Conscription Service (former)

Housing Service (former)

==== Defence Logistics Organisation ====
Defence Logistics Organisation

Logistics Operations Centre

RSOM Battalion

Host Nation Support Battalion

National Support Element Afghanistan (former)

Telecom and Data Service (former)

=== Norwegian Army ===
Norwegian Army

Chief of the Norwegian Army

Army Staff

Military Police Regiment

Logistic Regiment

Allied Training Centre

Weapons Technical Regiment

Land Warfare Centre

Winter Warfare School

Centre of Excellence – Cold Weather Operations

Recruit and Vocational Training School

Army NCO School

CBRNE School

Canine School

Competence Centre for Logistics and Operational Support

School of Logistics

School of Ammunitions and Explosive Ordnance Disposal

Maneuver School

School of Tactics and Operations

Artillery School

Engineer School

Signal School

His Majesty The King's Guard

Nordenfjeldske Intelligence Regiment

Brigade Nord

Armoured Battalion

Telemark Battalion

Narvik Battalion

Artillery Battalion

Combat Engineer Battalion

Signal Battalion

Medical Battalion

Combat Service Support Battalion

Military Police Company

Finnmark Brigade

Ranger Battalion GSV

Porsanger Battalion

Logistics Battalion

SHORAD Battery

2nd Armoured Squadron

4th Assault Squadron

5th Cavalry Squadron

6th Combat Support Squadron

Tank Squadron 1

Finnmark Land Command Staff

1st Armoured Reconnaissance Squadron

2nd Armoured Reconnaissance Squadron

6th Combat Support Squadron

Boat and Diving Squad

Intelligence and Electronic Warfare School

Electronic Warfare Company

Combat Support Company

Long Range Reconnaissance Squadron

Military Intelligence Squadron

Unmanned Aerial Vehicle Squadron

Former arms of the Norwegian Army

His Majesty The King's Guard

Independent Norwegian Brigade Group in Germany

Independent Norwegian Brigade Group in Germany Command

Independent Norwegian Brigade Group in Germany (Hanover District)

Independent Norwegian Brigade Group in Germany (Hamburg District)

Independent Norwegian Brigade Group in Germany (5th Yorkshire Division)

1st Division

6th Division / Troms Land Defence

Brigade in Southern Norway

Brigade in Northern Norway

Finnmark Land Command

Alta Battalion

Varanger Battalion

1st Combined Regiment

3rd Combined Regiment

5th Combined Regiment

6th Combined Regiment

7th Combined Regiment

8th Combined Regiment

9th Combined Regiment

12th Combined Regiment

13th Combined Regiment

14th Combined Regiment

15th Combined Regiment

6th Division

District Command Nord-Norge / 6th Division

District Command Sør og Vestlandet

District Command Sørlandet

District Command Trøndelag

District Command Vestlandet

District Command Østlandet

District Command Vestlandet Organizational Committee

Brigade Sør

Brigade Vest

1st Brigade

3rd Brigade

5th Brigade

6th Brigade

7th Brigade

8th Brigade

12th Brigade

13th Brigade

14th Brigade

15th Brigade

Østre Oslofjord Defence District

Vestre Oslofjord Defence District / Telemark Regiment

Akershus Defence District / Akershus Regiment

Østoppland Defence District / Oppland Regiment

Vestoppland Defence District

Agder Defence District / Agder Regiment

Rogaland Defence District / Rogaland Regiment

Hordaland Defence District / Bergenhus Regiment

Fjordane Defence District / Fjordane Regiment

Møre Defence District / Møre Regiment

Sør-Trøndelag Defence District / Sør-Trøndelag Regiment

Nord-Trøndelag Defence District / Nord-Trøndelag Regiment

Sør-Hålogaland Land Defence / Sør-Hålogaland Regiment

Nord-Hålogaland Land Defence / Nord-Hålogaland Regiment

Troms Land Defence / 6th Division

1st Infantry Battalion

Allied Training Centre South

Army Supply Command (1983-1997)

Army Supply Command (1997-2002)

Army Supply Depot Nord-Norge

Army Supply Depot Sør-Vestlandet

Army Supply Depot Trøndelag

Army Supply Depot Østlandet

3rd Supply Regiment

5th Supply Regiment (1980)

5th Supply Regiment (1991)

6th Supply Regiment

Army Staff School

Army Administration School

Administration School

Intendant's School and Training Department

Infantry Training Department Finnmark

NCO School for Infantry in Northern Norway

NCO School for Infantry in Northern Norway

NCO School for Infantry in Northern Norway

NCO School for Infantry in Trøndelag

NCO School for Infantry in Southern Norway

NCO School for Infantry in Southern Norway

Infantry Course Department

Shooting and Winter School for Infantry

Mortar Course

Discharged Sergeant Course

Training and Competence Center for Infantry

Training and Competence Center for Air Defense

NCO School for the Cavalry

Nordenfjeldske Dragoon Regiment

Søndenfjeldske Dragoon Regiment

Søndenfjeldske Dragoon Regiment

Cavalry Weapons School

Cavalry Training School

Staff and Management Coach

Staff and Management Coach

Reconnaissance Squadron

Armoured Squadron

Armoured Squadron Østlandet

Anti-Tank Squadron

Anti-Tank Wing

1st Armoured Battalion

Combat Squadron

Garrison of Porsanger

Garrison of Porsanger Armoured Squad

Artillery

Army Artillery

Field Artillery

Artillery Inspector

Field Artillery NCO School

Artillery NCO School

Artillery NCO School

Artillery NCO School

Artillery Sergeant Course

Artillery Sergeant Course

Artillery Shooting School

1st Artillery Regiment

2nd Artillery Regiment

2nd Artillery Regiment

Artillery Regiment

Army Medical Services

Medical School and Training Department

Medical Regiment

Medical Battalion

Signal Regiment

Engineer Regiment

Engineer Battalion

NCO School for Engineers

Transport Corps School and Training Department

Transport Company

Logistic Regiment

Support Regiment in Southern Norway

Logistics Battalion

Logistics Education and Competence Center

Combat Training Centre

Combat School

Combat Centre

Tactical Training Centre

Weapons Technical Corps

Weapons Technical Corps Vocational School

Weapons Technical Corps NCO School

Heistadmoen Technical Workshop

Electronic Warfare Company

Technical Sensor Squadron

All Source Intelligence Cell

Norwegian Infantry Battalion

Norwegian Mechanized Infantry Battalion

Norwegian Rifle Company

Reinforcement Forces

Reaction and Follow-On Forces

Theatre Enabling Forces

Signal Company

National Support Element

Norwegian NATO Element in the Former Yugoslav Republic of Macedonia

Civil-Military Cooperation

Military Academy

=== Royal Norwegian Navy ===
Royal Norwegian Navy

Chief of the Royal Norwegian Navy

Navy Staff

Norwegian Task Group

Norwegian Fleet

Coast Guard

Chief of the Coast Guard

Medical Service

Harald Haarfagre Basic Training Establishment

Tordenskjold Naval Training Establishment

Naval Co-operation and Guidance for Shipping

Haakonsvern Naval Base

Ramsund Naval Base

1st Frigate Squadron

1st Corvette Squadron

1st Minesweeper Squadron

Submarine Service

Submarine School

Coastal Ranger Commando

EOD Command

Fleet Logistics Command

Sea Logistics Base

Former arms of the Norwegian Navy

Royal Norwegian Navy

Inspector General of the Royal Norwegian Navy

Navy Staff

Coastal Artillery

Coastal Artillery

Coastal Artillery

Sea Home Guard (Navy variant)

Fleet Inspector

Coastal Artillery Inspector

Coast Guard Inspector

Escort Vessel Inspector

Missile Torpedo Boat Inspector

Mine Vessel Inspector

Naval Academy

Navy Schools

Navy NCO School

Fleet NCO School

Naval Corps

Coastal Artillery NCO School

Machine and Electrical School

Canine School (Navy variant)

Hysnes Training Department

Trondenes Training Department

Submarines Branch

Frigate Arm Training Centre

Corvette Division

MTB Arm Training Centre

Mine Branch

Mine Branch Training Centre

Fleet Ranger Branch

Fleet Ranger Branch Training Centre

EOD Command

Tactical Boat Squadron

Coastal Combat Flotilla

1st Patrol Boat Division

1st Patrol Boat Division (proposed)

21st Missile Torpedo Boat Squadron

30th Missile Torpedo Boat Flotilla

Landing Craft Squadron

Supply Command

Fleet Logistics Arm

Navy Command East

Navy Command South

Sørlandet Naval District

Trøndelag Naval District

Vestlandet Naval District

Naval District North

Naval District South

Harstad Naval District

Rogaland Naval District

Coast Guard Squadron North

Coast Guard Squadron South

Royal Norwegian Fleet Music

Bolærne Fort

Breiviknes Fort

Grøtavær Fort

Grøtsund Fort

Grøtsund Fort (Variant)

Herdla Fort

Korshamn Fort

Kråkvåg Fort

Meløyvær Fort

Nes Fort

Oscarsborg Fortress

Rødbergodden Fort

Skjeljanger Fort

Vardøhus Fortress

Visterøy Fort

Årøybukt Fort

Coastal Radar North

Coastal Radar South

==== Ship arms of the Navy ====
His Norwegian Majesty's Yacht Norge

HNoMS Fridtjof Nansen

HNoMS Roald Amundsen

HNoMS Otto Sverdrup

HNoMS Thor Heyerdahl

HNoMS Skjold

HNoMS Storm

HNoMS Skudd

HNoMS Steil

HNoMS Glimt

HNoMS Gnist

HNoMS Måløy

HNoMS Hinnøy

HNoMS Otra

HNoMS Rauma

HNoMS Ula

HNoMS Utsira

HNoMS Utstein

HNoMS Utvær

HNoMS Uthaug

HNoMS Uredd

HNoMS Maud

HNoMS Olav Tryggvason

HNoMS Magnus Lagabøte

HNoMS Kvarven

HNoMS Nordne

NoCGV Jan Mayen

NoCGV Bjørnøya

NoCGV Hopen

NoCGV Svalbard

NoCGV Harstad

HNoMS Nordkapp

NoCGV Andenes

NoCGV Barentshav

NoCGV Bergen

NoCGV Sortland

NoCGV Jarl

NoCGV Bison

NoCGV Nornen

NoCGV Farm

NoCGV Heimdal

NoCGV Njord

NoCGV Tor

Former ship arms of the Navy

His Norwegian Majesty's Yacht Norge

HNoMS Helge Ingstad

HNoMS Oslo

HNoMS Bergen

HNoMS Trondheim

HNoMS Stavanger

HNoMS Narvik

HNoMS Glimt and other gunboats

HNoMS Sleipner

HNoMS Æger

HNoMS Måløy

HNoMS Hinnøy

HNoMS Karmøy

HNoMS Karmøy

HNoMS Karmøy

HNoMS Otra

HNoMS Rauma

HNoMS Alta

HNoMS Alta

HNoMS Alta

HNoMS Tana

HNoMS Vidar

HNoMS Vale

HNoMS Ula and other Ula-class vessels

HNoMS Kobben and other Kobben-class vessels

HNoMS Horten

HNoMS Horten

HNoMS Stord

HNoMS Haakon VII

NoCGV Magnus Lagabøte

HNoMS Tyr

HNoMS Valkyrien

HNoMS Harstad

NoCGV Nordkapp

NoCGV Senja

NoCGV Ålesund

HNoMS Hesse

HNoMS Vigra

=== Royal Norwegian Air Force ===
Royal Norwegian Air Force

Chief of the Royal Norwegian Air Force

Air Force Staff

Combined Air Operations Centre Bodø

Air Operations Inspectorate

Flight Safety Inspectorate

Air Force School Centre

Air Force Specialist and Sergeant School

Air Force Flight School

Command and Control School

Air Force Weapons School

Flight Operational Training Centre

Air Defence Tactical School

Base Defence Tactical School

Norwegian Armed Forces Electronic Warfare Centre

130 Air Wing

132 Air Wing

133 Air Wing

134 Air Wing

Maritime Helicopter Wing

330 Squadron

331 Squadron

332 Squadron

333 Squadron

334 Squadron

335 Squadron

337 Squadron

339 Squadron

Air Defence Artillery

Air Defence Battalion

Air Defence Battalion Evenes

Base Defence Battalion Evenes

Base Defence Battalion Ørland

Former arms of the Royal Norwegian Air Force

Royal Norwegian Air Force

Inspector General of the Royal Norwegian Air Force

Air Force Staff

Norwegian Joint Air Operations Centre

Norwegian Air Operations Centre

Supply Command

Education Inspectorate

Education Inspectorate

Base Defence Inspectorate

Air Force Schools

Control and Notification School

Air Force Technical School Centre

Air Force Flight School

Flight Tactical School

Staff School

131 Air Wing

135 Air Wing

139 Air Wing

334 Squadron

336 Squadron

336 Squadron

338 Squadron

338 Squadron

339 Squadron

717 Squadron

717 Squadron

718 Squadron

718 Squadron

718 Squadron

719 Squadron

720 Squadron

Air Force Task Force

Special Operations Air Task Group

Ørland Main Air Station

Ørland Main Air Station

Ørlandet Air Station

Andøya Air Station

Station Group Banak

Banak Air Station

Bardufoss Air Station

Bardufoss Air Station

Bodø Main Air Station

Evenes Air Station

Evenes Air Station

Flesland Air Station

Fornebu Air Station

Station Group Gardermoen

Station Group Gardermoen

Gardemoen Air Station

Lista Air Station

Rygge Air Force Base

Rygge Air Station

Rygge Air Station

Sola Air Station

Electronics Squadron at Bodø Air Station

Station Gråkallen

Station Honningsvåg

Station Kautokeino

Station Mågerø

Station Måkerøy

Station Sørreisa

Station Sørreisa

Station Sørreisa

Station Vardø

Air Defence Artillery Battalion Andøya

Air Defence Artillery Battalion Bardufoss

Air Defence Battalion Bodø

Air Defence Artillery Battalion Bodø

Air Defence Artillery Battalion Rygge

Air Defence Artillery Battalion Værnes

Air Defence Artillery Battalion Ørland

Air Defence Artillery Battalion Ørland

Nike Battalion

Nike Battalion

Nike Battalion

Nike Battalion Våler Battery

=== Norwegian Home Guard ===
Norwegian Home Guard

Chief of the Norwegian Home Guard

Home Guard Staff

Home Guard Land Warfare Centre

Oslofjord Home Guard District 01

Oslo og Akershus Home Guard District 02

Telemark og Buskerud Home Guard District 03

Opplandske Home Guard District 05

Agder og Rogaland Home Guard District 08

Bergenhus Home Guard District 09

Møre og Fjordane Home Guard District 11

Trøndelag Home Guard District 12

Sør-Hålogaland Home Guard District 14

Nord-Hålogaland Home Guard District 16

Finnmark Home Guard District 17

Home Guard Youth

Operation Ellisiv

Rapid Deployment Squadron

Rapid Deployment Squadron Drone Unit

Recruit Battery

Former arms of the Norwegian Home Guard

Air Home Guard

Land Home Guard

Sea Home Guard

Home Guard NCO School

Home Guard School and Competence Centre

Akershus Home Guard District 04

Østoppland Home Guard District 05

Vestoppland Home Guard District 06

Agder Home Guard District 07

Rogaland Home Guard District 08

Hordaland Home Guard District 09

Sør-Trøndelag Home Guard District 12

Nord-Trøndelag Home Guard District 13

Sør-Hålogaland Home Guard District 14

Nord-Hålogaland Home Guard District 15

Troms Home Guard District 16

Varanger Home Guard District 18

Home Guard Special Division 016

Home Guard 024

Home Guard Air Defence Forces

Home Guard Air Defence Artillery

Home Guard Air Defence Artillery

HV Air Defence Fornebu

HV Air Defence Flesland

=== Cyber Defence Force ===
Cyber Defence Force

Chief of the Cyber Defence

CIS-Regiment

Cybersecurity Centre

Cyber Defence Weapons School

Cyber Defence ICT services

Base Support and Alarm Services

Digitization Department

Communication and Information Systems Task Group

Competence and Transformation Department (former)

Armed Forces Archival Service (former)

=== Special Operations Command ===
Special Operations Command

Chief of the Special Operations Command

Special Operations Command Staff

Special Operations Commando

Naval Special Operations Commando

Army Ranger Command (former)

Army Parachute Ranger School (former)

=== Defence University College ===
Defence University College

Commandant of the Norwegian Defence University College

Military Academy

Naval Academy

Air Force Academy

Defence Cyber Academy

Staff School

Armed Forces NCO School

Language and Intelligence School

Norwegian Defence International Centre

School of Administration (former)

Remote Education (former)

Norwegian Institute for Defence Studies

Chief's Course Section

=== Intelligence Service ===
Intelligence Service

Intelligence College

Military Geographical Service

=== Allied units ===
Joint Warfare Centre

Enhanced Forward Presence

Response Force

Joint Expeditionary Force

Joint Expeditionary Force

Former arms of allied units

Allied Forces Northern Europe

Allied Forces Northern Europe

Joint Headquarters North

Allied Land Forces Norway

No. 10 (Inter-Allied) Commando

British Occupation Forces in Norway

474th Infantry Regiment (Regimental Combat Team)

99th Infantry Battalion (the Viking Battalion)

British Army of the Rhine

Joint Expeditionary Force (2017)

== Counties and municipalities ==
=== Agder ===
Arms for Agder county and the municipalities (current and former) within it:

Coat of arms of Agder County

Municipalities of Agder

Coat of arms of Arendal Municipality

Coat of arms of Birkenes Municipality

Coat of arms of Bygland Municipality

Coat of arms of Bykle Municipality

Coat of arms of Evje og Hornnes Municipality

Coat of arms of Farsund Municipality

Coat of arms of Flekkefjord Municipality

Coat of arms of Froland Municipality

Coat of arms of Gjerstad Municipality

Coat of arms of Grimstad Municipality

Coat of arms of Hægebostad Municipality

Coat of arms of Iveland Municipality

Coat of arms of Kristiansand Municipality

Coat of arms of Kvinesdal Municipality

Coat of arms of Lillesand Municipality

Coat of arms of Lindesnes Municipality

Coat of arms of Lyngdal Municipality

Coat of arms of Risør Municipality

Coat of arms of Sirdal Municipality

Coat of arms of Tvedestrand Municipality

Coat of arms of Valle Municipality

Coat of arms of Vegårshei Municipality

Coat of arms of Vennesla Municipality

Coat of arms of Åmli Municipality

Coat of arms of Åseral Municipality

Former arms from Agder

Coat of arms of Aust-Agder County
(1958-2019)

Coat of arms of Vest-Agder County
(1958-2019)

Coat of arms of Audnedal Municipality
(1991-2019)

Coat of arms of Hisøy Municipality
(1986-1991)

Coat of arms of Lillesand Municipality
(1954-1987)

Coat of arms of Lindesnes Municipality
(1986-2019)

Coat of arms of Lyngdal Municipality
(1987-2019)

Coat of arms of Mandal Municipality
(1921-2019)

Coat of arms of Marnardal Municipality
(1987-2019)

Coat of arms of Moland Municipality
(1983-1991)

Coat of arms of Songdalen Municipality
(1985-2019)

Coat of arms of Søgne Municipality
(1985-2019)

Coat of arms of Tromøy Municipality
(1985-1991)

Coat of arms of Øyestad Municipality
(1985-1991)

=== Akershus ===
Arms for Akershus county and the municipalities (current and former) within it:

Coat of arms of Akershus County

Municipalities of Akershus

Coat of arms of Asker Municipality

Coat of arms of Aurskog-Høland Municipality

Coat of arms of Bærum Municipality

Coat of arms of Eidsvoll Municipality

Coat of arms of Enebakk Municipality

Coat of arms of Frogn Municipality

Coat of arms of Gjerdrum Municipality

Coat of arms of Hurdal Municipality

Coat of arms of Jevnaker Municipality

Coat of arms of Lillestrøm Municipality

Coat of arms of Lunner Municipality

Coat of arms of Lørenskog Municipality

Coat of arms of Nannestad Municipality

Coat of arms of Nes Municipality

Coat of arms of Nesodden Municipality

Coat of arms of Nittedal Municipality

Coat of arms of Nordre Follo Municipality

Coat of arms of Rælingen Municipality

Coat of arms of Ullensaker Municipality

Coat of arms of Vestby Municipality

Coat of arms of Ås Municipality

Former arms from Akershus

Coat of arms of Viken County
(2020-2024)

Coat of arms of Asker Municipality
(1975-2019)

Coat of arms of Aurskog-Høland Municipality
(1983-2019)

Coat of arms of Fet Municipality
(1986-2019)

Coat of arms of Oppegård Municipality
(1976-2019)

Coat of arms of Skedsmo Municipality
(1974-2019)

Coat of arms of Ski Municipality
(1986-2019)

Coat of arms of Sørum Municipality
(1981-2019)

=== Buskerud ===
Arms for Buskerud county and the municipalities (current and former) within it:

Coat of arms of Buskerud County

Municipalities of Buskerud

Coat of arms of Drammen Municipality

Coat of arms of Flå Municipality

Coat of arms of Flesberg Municipality

Coat of arms of Gol Municipality

Coat of arms of Hemsedal Municipality

Coat of arms of Hol Municipality

Coat of arms of Hole Municipality

Coat of arms of Kongsberg Municipality

Coat of arms of Krødsherad Municipality

Coat of arms of Lier Municipality

Coat of arms of Modum Municipality

Coat of arms of Nesbyen Municipality

Coat of arms of Nore og Uvdal Municipality

Coat of arms of Øvre Eiker Municipality

Coat of arms of Ringerike Municipality

Coat of arms of Rollag Municipality

Coat of arms of Sigdal Municipality

Coat of arms of Ål Municipality

Former arms from Buskerud

Coat of arms of Viken County
(2020-2024)

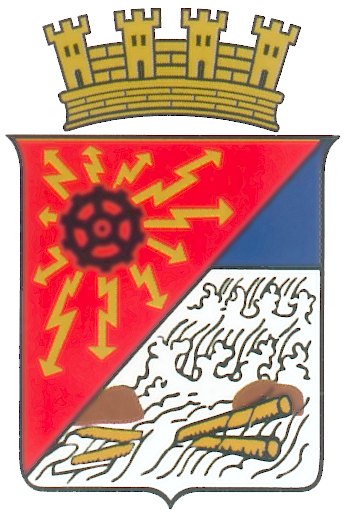
Coat of arms of Hønefoss Municipality
(1902-1963)

Coat of arms of Hurum Municipality
(1979-2019)

Coat of arms of Nedre Eiker Municipality
(1970-2019)

Coat of arms of Røyken Municipality
(1967-2019)

=== Finnmark ===
Arms for Finnmark county and the municipalities (current and former) within it:

Coat of arms of Finnmark County

Municipalities of Finnmark

Coat of arms of Alta Municipality

Coat of arms of Berlevåg Municipality

Coat of arms of Båtsfjord Municipality

Coat of arms of Gamvik Municipality

Coat of arms of Hammerfest Municipality

Coat of arms of Hasvik Municipality

Coat of arms of Karasjok Municipality

Coat of arms of Kautokeino Municipality

Coat of arms of Lebesby Municipality

Coat of arms of Loppa Municipality

Coat of arms of Måsøy Municipality

Coat of arms of Nesseby Municipality

Coat of arms of Nordkapp Municipality

Coat of arms of Porsanger Municipality

Coat of arms of Sør-Varanger Municipality

Coat of arms of Tana Municipality

Coat of arms of Vadsø Municipality

Coat of arms of Vardø Municipality

Former arms from Finnmark

Coat of arms of Troms og Finnmark County
(2020-2024)

Coat of arms of Kvalsund Municipality
(1987-2019)

Coat of arms of Sørøysund Municipality
(1979-1991)

=== Innlandet ===
Arms for Innlandet county and the municipalities (current and former) within it:

Coat of arms of Innlandet County

Municipalities of Innlandet

Coat of arms of Alvdal Municipality

Coat of arms of Dovre Municipality

Coat of arms of Eidskog Municipality

Coat of arms of Elverum Municipality

Coat of arms of Engerdal Municipality

Coat of arms of Etnedal Municipality

Coat of arms of Folldal Municipality

Coat of arms of Gausdal Municipality

Coat of arms of Gjøvik Municipality

Coat of arms of Gran Municipality

Coat of arms of Grue Municipality

Coat of arms of Hamar Municipality

Coat of arms of Kongsvinger Municipality

Coat of arms of Lesja Municipality

Coat of arms of Lillehammer Municipality

Coat of arms of Lom Municipality

Coat of arms of Løten Municipality

Coat of arms of Nord-Aurdal Municipality

Coat of arms of Nord-Fron Municipality

Coat of arms of Nord-Odal Municipality

Coat of arms of Nordre Land Municipality

Coat of arms of Os Municipality

Coat of arms of Rendalen Municipality

Coat of arms of Ringebu Municipality

Coat of arms of Ringsaker Municipality

Coat of arms of Sel Municipality

Coat of arms of Skjåk Municipality

Coat of arms of Stange Municipality

Coat of arms of Stor-Elvdal Municipality

Coat of arms of Søndre Land Municipality

Coat of arms of Sør-Aurdal Municipality

Coat of arms of Sør-Fron Municipality

Coat of arms of Sør-Odal Municipality

Coat of arms of Tolga Municipality

Coat of arms of Trysil Municipality

Coat of arms of Tynset Municipality

Coat of arms of Vang Municipality

Coat of arms of Vestre Slidre Municipality

Coat of arms of Vestre Toten Municipality

Coat of arms of Vågå Municipality

Coat of arms of Våler Municipality

Coat of arms of Østre Toten Municipality

Coat of arms of Øyer Municipality

Coat of arms of Øystre Slidre Municipality

Coat of arms of Åmot Municipality

Coat of arms of Åsnes Municipality

Former arms from Innlandet

Coat of arms of Hedmark County
(1987-2019)

Coat of arms of Oppland County
(1989-2019)

=== Møre og Romsdal ===
Arms for Møre og Romsdal county and the municipalities (current and former) within it:

Coat of arms of Møre og Romsdal County

Municipalities of Møre og Romsdal

Coat of arms of Aukra Municipality

Coat of arms of Aure Municipality

Coat of arms of Averøy Municipality

Coat of arms of Fjord Municipality

Coat of arms of Giske Municipality

Coat of arms of Gjemnes Municipality

Coat of arms of Haram Municipality

Coat of arms of Hareid Municipality

Coat of arms of Herøy Municipality

Coat of arms of Hustadvika Municipality

Coat of arms of Kristiansund Municipality

Coat of arms of Molde Municipality

Coat of arms of Rauma Municipality

Coat of arms of Sande Municipality

Coat of arms of Smøla Municipality

Coat of arms of Stranda Municipality

Coat of arms of Sula Municipality

Coat of arms of Sunndal Municipality

Coat of arms of Surnadal Municipality

Coat of arms of Sykkylven Municipality

Coat of arms of Tingvoll Municipality

Coat of arms of Ulstein Municipality

Coat of arms of Vanylven Municipality

Coat of arms of Vestnes Municipality

Coat of arms of Volda Municipality

Coat of arms of Ørsta Municipality

Coat of arms of Ålesund Municipality

Former arms from Møre og Romsdal

Coat of arms of the old Aure Municipality
(1991-2005)

Coat of arms of Eide Municipality
(1982-2019)

Coat of arms of Frei Municipality
(1987-2007)

Coat of arms of Fræna Municipality
(1995-2019)

Coat of arms of Halsa Municipality
(1988-2019)

Coat of arms of Midsund Municipality
(1987-2019)

Coat of arms of Nesset Municipality
(1986-2019)

Coat of arms of Norddal Municipality
(1990-2019)

Coat of arms of Sandøy Municipality
(1986-2019)

Coat of arms of Skodje Municipality
(1987-2019)

Coat of arms of Stordal Municipality
(1991-2019)

Coat of arms of Tustna Municipality
(1988-2005)

Coat of arms of Volda Municipality
(1987-2019)

Coat of arms of Ørskog Municipality
(1983-2019)

=== Nordland ===
Arms for Nordland county and the municipalities (current and former) within it:

Coat of arms of Nordland County

Municipalities of Nordland

Coat of arms of Alstahaug Municipality

Coat of arms of Andøy Municipality

Coat of arms of Beiarn Municipality

Coat of arms of Bindal Municipality

Coat of arms of Bodø Municipality

Coat of arms of Brønnøy Municipality

Coat of arms of Bø Municipality

Coat of arms of Dønna Municipality

Coat of arms of Evenes Municipality

Coat of arms of Fauske Municipality

Coat of arms of Flakstad Municipality

Coat of arms of Gildeskål Municipality

Coat of arms of Grane Municipality

Coat of arms of Hadsel Municipality

Coat of arms of Hamarøy Municipality

Coat of arms of Hattfjelldal Municipality

Coat of arms of Hemnes Municipality

Coat of arms of Herøy Municipality

Coat of arms of Leirfjord Municipality

Coat of arms of Lurøy Municipality

Coat of arms of Lødingen Municipality

Coat of arms of Meløy Municipality

Coat of arms of Moskenes Municipality

Coat of arms of Narvik Municipality

Coat of arms of Nesna Municipality

Coat of arms of Rana Municipality

Coat of arms of Rødøy Municipality

Coat of arms of Røst Municipality

Coat of arms of Saltdal Municipality

Coat of arms of Sortland Municipality

Coat of arms of Steigen Municipality

Coat of arms of Sømna Municipality

Coat of arms of Sørfold Municipality

Coat of arms of Træna Municipality

Coat of arms of Vefsn Municipality

Coat of arms of Vega Municipality

Coat of arms of Vestvågøy Municipality

Coat of arms of Vevelstad Municipality

Coat of arms of Værøy Municipality

Coat of arms of Vågan Municipality

Coat of arms of Øksnes Municipality

Former arms from Nordland

Coat of arms of Ballangen Municipality
(1980-2019)

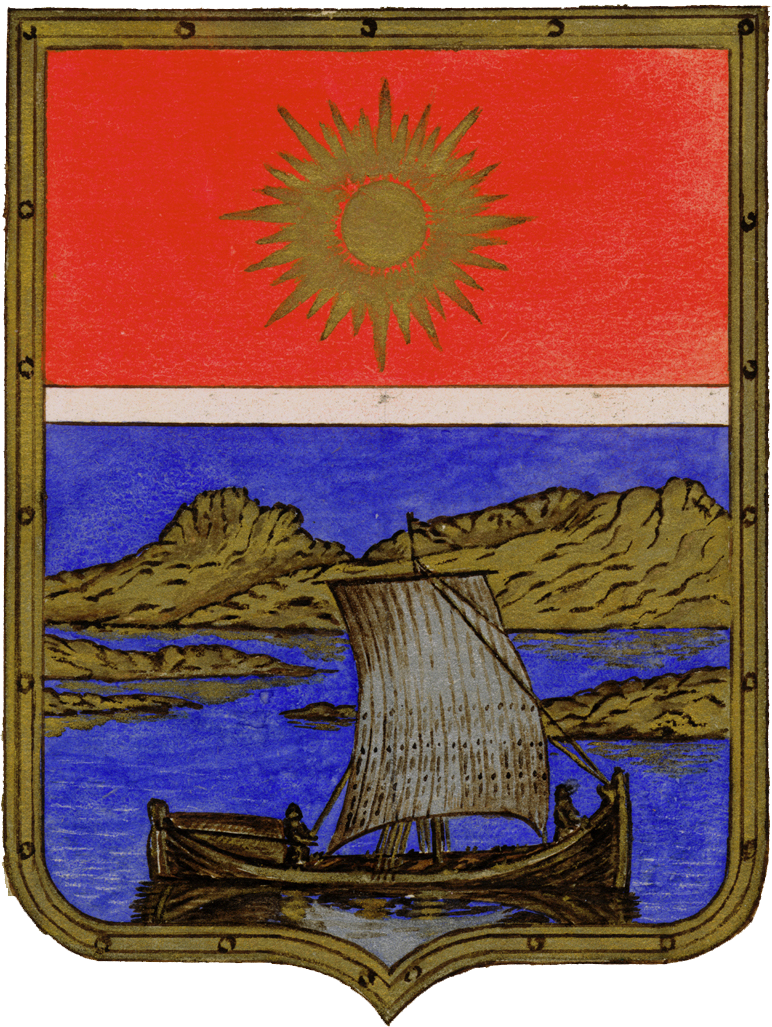
Coat of arms of Bodø Municipality
(1889-1959)

Coat of arms of Brønnøysund Municipality
(1923-1963)

Coat of arms of Hamarøy Municipality
(1982-2019)

Coat of arms of Mo Municipality
(1960-1963)

Coat of arms of Mosjøen Municipality
(1960-1961)

Coat of arms of Narvik Municipality
(1951-2019)

Coat of arms of Skjerstad Municipality
(1991-2004)

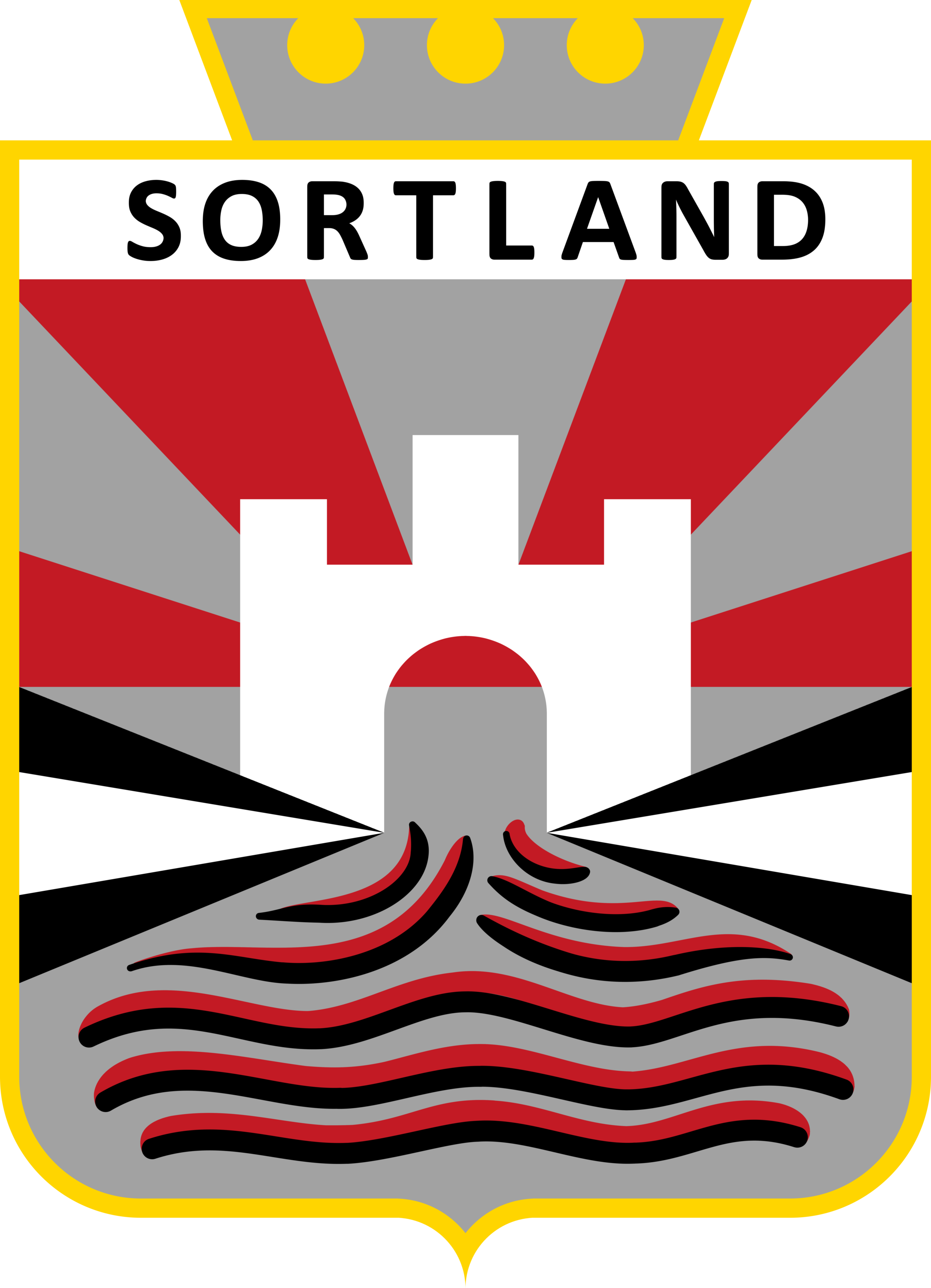
Coat of arms of Sortland Municipality
(1950-1985)

Coat of arms of Svolvær Municipality
(1941-1964)

Coat of arms of Tysfjord Municipality
(1987-2019)

=== Oslo ===
Arms for Oslo county:

City seal of Oslo

=== Rogaland ===
Arms for Rogaland county and the municipalities (current and former) within it:

Coat of arms of Rogaland County

Municipalities of Rogaland

Coat of arms of Bjerkreim Municipality

Coat of arms of Bokn Municipality

Coat of arms of Eigersund Municipality

Coat of arms of Gjesdal Municipality

Coat of arms of Haugesund Municipality

Coat of arms of Hjelmeland Municipality

Coat of arms of Hå Municipality

Coat of arms of Karmøy Municipality

Coat of arms of Klepp Municipality

Coat of arms of Kvitsøy Municipality

Coat of arms of Lund Municipality

Coat of arms of Randaberg Municipality

Coat of arms of Sandnes Municipality

Coat of arms of Sauda Municipality

Coat of arms of Sokndal Municipality

Coat of arms of Sola Municipality

Coat of arms of Stavanger Municipality

Coat of arms of Strand Municipality

Coat of arms of Suldal Municipality

Coat of arms of Time Municipality

Coat of arms of Tysvær Municipality

Coat of arms of Utsira Municipality

Coat of arms of Vindafjord Municipality

Former arms from Rogaland

Coat of arms of Finnøy Municipality
(1983-2019)

Coat of arms of Forsand Municipality
(1988-2019)

Coat of arms of Rennesøy Municipality
(1981-2019)

Coat of arms of the old Vindafjord Municipality
(1986-2005)

Coat of arms of Ølen Municipality
(1986-2005)

=== Telemark ===
Arms for Telemark county and the municipalities (current and former) within it:

Coat of arms of Telemark County

Municipalities of Telemark

Coat of arms of Bamble Municipality

Coat of arms of Drangedal Municipality

Coat of arms of Fyresdal Municipality

Coat of arms of Hjartdal Municipality

Coat of arms of Kragerø Municipality

Coat of arms of Kviteseid Municipality

Coat of arms of Midt-Telemark Municipality

Coat of arms of Nissedal Municipality

Coat of arms of Nome Municipality

Coat of arms of Notodden Municipality

Coat of arms of Porsgrunn Municipality

Coat of arms of Seljord Municipality

Coat of arms of Siljan Municipality

Coat of arms of Skien Municipality

Coat of arms of Tinn Municipality

Coat of arms of Tokke Municipality

Coat of arms of Vinje Municipality

Former arms from Telemark

Coat of arms of Vestfold og Telemark County
(2020-2024)

Coat of arms of Telemark County
(1970-2019)

Coat of arms of Brevik Municipality
(1954-1964)

Coat of arms of Bø Municipality
(1988-2019)

Coat of arms of Sauherad Municipality
(1989-2019)

Coat of arms of Stathelle Municipality
(1989-2019)

=== Troms ===
Arms for Troms county and the municipalities (current and former) within it:

Coat of arms of Troms County

Municipalities of Troms

Coat of arms of Balsfjord Municipality

Coat of arms of Bardu Municipality

Coat of arms of Dyrøy Municipality

Coat of arms of Gáivuotna-Kåfjord-Kaivuono Municipality

Coat of arms of Gratangen Municipality

Coat of arms of Harstad Municipality

Coat of arms of Ibestad Municipality

Coat of arms of Karlsøy Municipality

Coat of arms of Kvæfjord Municipality

Coat of arms of Kvænangen Municipality

Coat of arms of Lavangen Municipality

Coat of arms of Lyngen Municipality

Coat of arms of Målselv Municipality

Coat of arms of Nordreisa Municipality

Coat of arms of Salangen Municipality

Coat of arms of Senja Municipality

Coat of arms of Skjervøy Municipality

Coat of arms of Storfjord Municipality

Coat of arms of Sørreisa Municipality

Coat of arms of Tjeldsund Municipality

Coat of arms of Tromsø Municipality

Former arms from Troms

Coat of arms of Troms og Finnmark County
(2020-2024)

Coat of arms of Berg Municipality
(1987-2019)

Coat of arms of Bjarkøy Municipality
(1986-2012)

Coat of arms of Lenvik Municipality
(1986-2019)

Coat of arms of Skånland Municipality
(1988-2019)

Coat of arms of Torsken Municipality
(1990-2019)

Coat of arms of Tranøy Municipality
(1987-2019)

Coat of arms of Tromsøysund Municipality
(1954-1961)

=== Trøndelag ===
Arms for Trondelag county and the municipalities (current and former) within it:

Coat of arms of Trøndelag County

Municipalities of Trøndelag

Coat of arms of Flatanger Municipality

Coat of arms of Frosta Municipality

Coat of arms of Frøya Municipality

Coat of arms of Grong Municipality

Coat of arms of Heim Municipality

Coat of arms of Hitra Municipality

Coat of arms of Holtålen Municipality

Coat of arms of Høylandet Municipality

Coat of arms of Inderøy Municipality

Coat of arms of Indre Fosen Municipality

Coat of arms of Leka Municipality

Coat of arms of Levanger Municipality

Coat of arms of Lierne Municipality

Coat of arms of Malvik Municipality

Coat of arms of Melhus Municipality

Coat of arms of Meråker Municipality

Coat of arms of Midtre Gauldal Municipality

Coat of arms of Namsos Municipality

Coat of arms of Namsskogan Municipality

Coat of arms of Nærøysund Municipality

Coat of arms of Oppdal Municipality

Coat of arms of Osen Municipality

Coat of arms of Orkland Municipality

Coat of arms of Overhalla Municipality

Coat of arms of Rennebu Municipality

Coat of arms of Rindal Municipality

Coat of arms of Røros Municipality

Coat of arms of Røyrvik Municipality

Coat of arms of Selbu Municipality

Coat of arms of Skaun Municipality

Coat of arms of Snåsa Municipality

Coat of arms of Steinkjer Municipality

Coat of arms of Stjørdal Municipality

Coat of arms of Trondheim Municipality

Coat of arms of Tydal Municipality

Coat of arms of Verdal Municipality

Coat of arms of Ørland Municipality

Coat of arms of Åfjord Municipality

Former arms from Trøndelag

Coat of arms of Nord-Trøndelag County
(1957-2017)

Coat of arms of Sør-Trøndelag County
(1983-2017)

Coat of arms of Agdenes Municipality
(1991-2019)

Coat of arms of Bjugn Municipality
(1989-2019)

Coat of arms of Fosnes Municipality
(1992-2019)

Coat of arms of Hemne Municipality
(1991-2019)

Coat of arms of Klæbu Municipality
(1983-2019)

Coat of arms of Leksvik Municipality
(1990-2017)

Coat of arms of Meldal Municipality
(1985-2019)

Coat of arms of Mosvik Municipality
(1984-2011)

Coat of arms of Namdalseid Municipality
(1989-2019)

Coat of arms of Nærøy Municipality
(1987-2019)

Coat of arms of Orkdal Municipality
(1986-2019)

Coat of arms of Rissa Municipality
(1987-2017)

Coat of arms of Roan Municipality
(1987-2019)

Coat of arms of Snillfjord Municipality
(1990-2019)

Coat of arms of Steinkjer Municipality
(1964-2019)

Coat of arms of Verran Municipality
(1987-2019)

Coat of arms of Vikna Municipality
(1988-2019)

Coat of arms of Åfjord Municipality
(1997-2019)

=== Vestfold ===
Arms for Vestfold county and the municipalities (current and former) within it:

Coat of arms of Vestfold County

Municipalities of Vestfold

Coat of arms of Færder Municipality

Coat of arms of Holmestrand Municipality

Coat of arms of Horten Municipality

Coat of arms of Larvik Municipality

Coat of arms of Sandefjord Municipality

Coat of arms of Tønsberg Municipality

Former arms from Vestfold

Coat of arms of Vestfold og Telemark County
(2020-2024)

Coat of arms of Vestfold County
(1970-2019)

Coat of arms of Andebu Municipality
(1986-2016)

Coat of arms of Brunlanes Municipality
(1985-1988)

Coat of arms of Hedrum Municipality
(1966-1988)

Coat of arms of Hof Municipality
(1992-2017)

Coat of arms of Holmestrand Municipality
(1898-2019)

Coat of arms of Lardal Municipality
(1992-2017)

Coat of arms of the old Larvik Municipality
(1899-1989)

Coat of arms of the old Larvik Municipality
(1989-2017)

Coat of arms of Nøtterøy Municipality
(1986-2017)

Coat of arms of Ramnes Municipality
(1976-2001)

Coat of arms of Re Municipality
(2001-2019)

Coat of arms of Sande Municipality
(1986-2019)

Coat of arms of the old Sandefjord Municipality
(1914-2017)

Coat of arms of Stokke Municipality
(1984-2016)

Coat of arms of Svelvik Municipality
(1964-2019)

Coat of arms of Tjølling Municipality
(1971-1987)

Coat of arms of Tjøme Municipality
(1989-2017)

Coat of arms of Tønsberg Municipality
(c. 1200-2019)

Coat of arms of Våle Municipality
(1990-2001)

Coat of arms of Åsgårdstrand Municipality
(1950-1965)

=== Vestland ===
Arms for Vestland county and the municipalities (current and former) within it:

Coat of arms of Vestland County

Municipalities of Vestland

Coat of arms of Alver Municipality

Coat of arms of Askvoll Municipality

Coat of arms of Askøy Municipality

Coat of arms of Aurland Municipality

Coat of arms of Austevoll Municipality

Coat of arms of Austrheim Municipality

Coat of arms of Bergen Municipality

Coat of arms of Bjørnafjorden Municipality

Coat of arms of Bremanger Municipality

Coat of arms of Bømlo Municipality

Coat of arms of Eidfjord Municipality

Coat of arms of Etne Municipality

Coat of arms of Fedje Municipality

Coat of arms of Fitjar Municipality

Coat of arms of Fjaler Municipality

Coat of arms of Gloppen Municipality

Coat of arms of Gulen Municipality

Coat of arms of Hyllestad Municipality

Coat of arms of Høyanger Municipality

Coat of arms of Kinn Municipality

Coat of arms of Kvam Municipality

Coat of arms of Kvinnherad Municipality

Coat of arms of Luster Municipality

Coat of arms of Lærdal Municipality

Coat of arms of Masfjorden Municipality

Coat of arms of Modalen Municipality

Coat of arms of Osterøy Municipality

Coat of arms of Samnanger Municipality

Coat of arms of Sogndal Municipality

Coat of arms of Solund Municipality

Coat of arms of Stad Municipality

Coat of arms of Stord Municipality

Coat of arms of Stryn Municipality

Coat of arms of Sunnfjord Municipality

Coat of arms of Sveio Municipality

Coat of arms of Tysnes Municipality

Coat of arms of Ullensvang Municipality

Coat of arms of Ulvik Municipality

Coat of arms of Vaksdal Municipality

Coat of arms of Vik Municipality

Coat of arms of Voss Municipality

Coat of arms of Øygarden Municipality

Coat of arms of Årdal Municipality

Former arms from Vestland

Coat of arms of Hordaland County
(1961-2019)

Coat of arms of Sogn og Fjordane County
(1983-2019)

Coat of arms of Balestrand Municipality
(1989-2019)

Coat of arms of Bruvik Municipality
(1960-1963)

Coat of arms of Eid Municipality
(1986-2019)

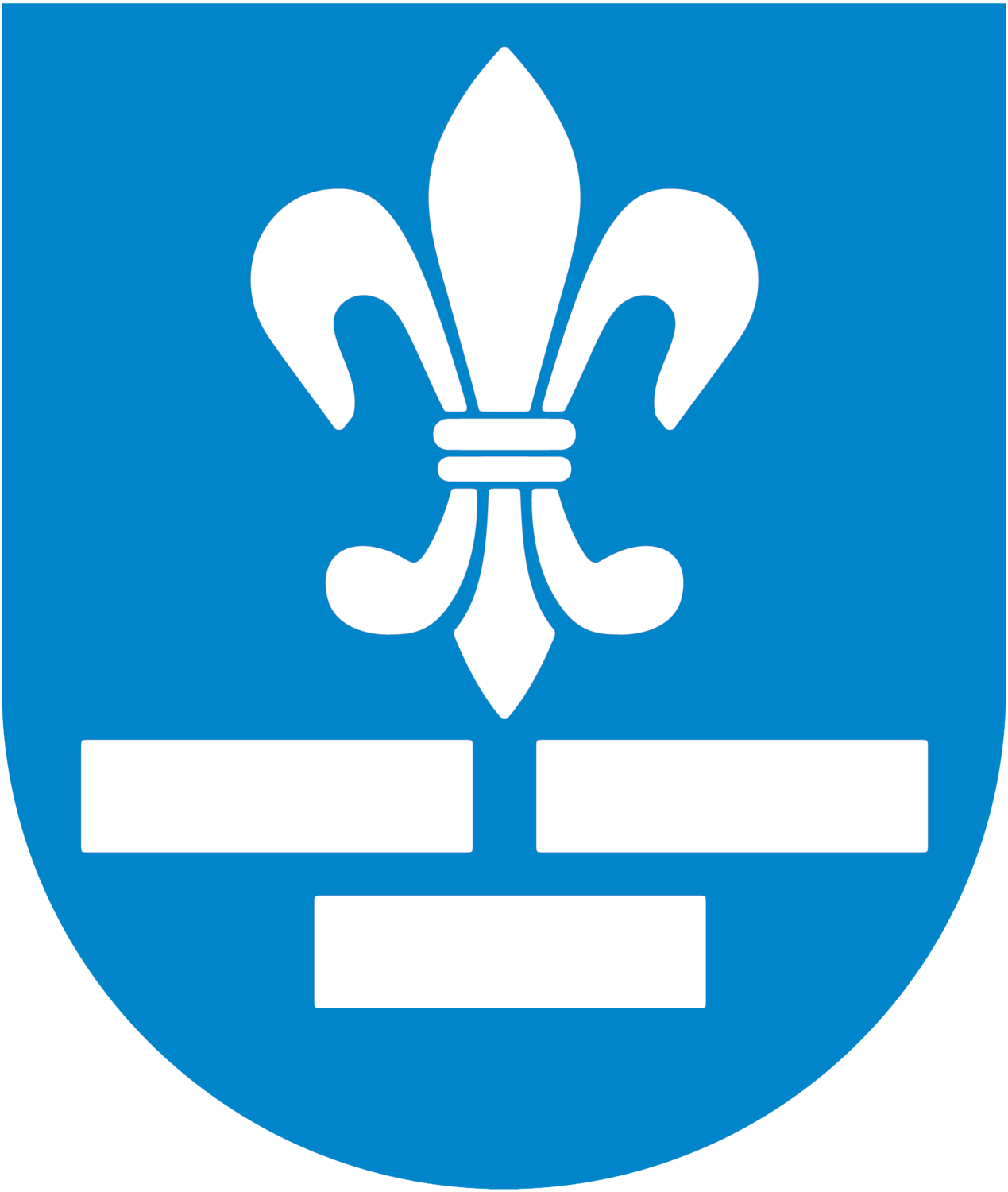
Coat of arms of Fana Municipality
(19??-1972)

Coat of arms of Fjell Municipality
(1957-2019)

Coat of arms of Flora Municipality
(1967-2019)

Coat of arms of Fusa Municipality
(1991-2019)

Coat of arms of Førde Municipality
(1990-2019)

Coat of arms of Gaular Municipality
(1992-2019)

Coat of arms of Granvin Municipality
(1988-2019)

Coat of arms of Hornindal Municipality
(1987-2019)

Coat of arms of Jondal Municipality
(1987-2019)

Coat of arms of Jølster Municipality
(1983-2019)

Coat of arms of Leikanger Municipality
(1963-2019)

Coat of arms of Lindås Municipality
(1979-2019)

Coat of arms of Meland Municipality
(1987-2019)

Coat of arms of Naustdal Municipality
(1987-2019)

Coat of arms of Odda Municipality
(1982-2019)

Coat of arms of Os Municipality
(1949-2019)

Coat of arms of Radøy Municipality
(1991-2019)

Coat of arms of Selje Municipality
(1991-2019)

Coat of arms of Sogndal Municipality
(1984-2019)

Old coat of arms of Stord Municipality
(1955-1987)

Old coat of arms of Sund Municipality
(1966-1988)

Coat of arms of Tysnes Municipality
(1971-2019)

Coat of arms of Ullensvang Municipality
(1979-2019)

Coat of arms of Vaksdal Municipality
(1964-1990)

Coat of arms of Voss Municipality
(1977-2019)

Coat of arms of Vågsøy Municipality
(1987-2019)

=== Østfold ===
Arms for Østfold county and the municipalities (current and former) within it:

Coat of arms of Østfold County

Municipalities of Østfold

Coat of arms of Aremark Municipality

Coat of arms of Fredrikstad Municipality

Coat of arms of Halden Municipality

Coat of arms of Hvaler Municipality

Coat of arms of Indre Østfold Municipality

Coat of arms of Marker Municipality

Coat of arms of Moss Municipality

Coat of arms of Råde Municipality

Coat of arms of Rakkestad Municipality

Coat of arms of Sarpsborg Municipality

Coat of arms of Skiptvet Municipality

Coat of arms of Våler Municipality

Former arms from Østfold

Coat of arms of Viken County
(2020-2024)

Coat of arms of Askim Municipality
(1963-2019)

Coat of arms of Borge Municipality
(1963-1993)

Coat of arms of Eidsberg Municipality
(1962-2019)

Coat of arms of Hobøl Municipality
(1985-2019)

Coat of arms of Kråkerøy Municipality
(1961-1993)

Coat of arms of Moss Municipality
(1954-2019)

Coat of arms of Onsøy Municipality
(1988-1993)

Coat of arms of Rolvsøy Municipality
(1982-1993)

Coat of arms of Rygge Municipality
(1984-2019)

Coat of arms of Rømskog Municipality
(1983-2019)

Coat of arms of Skjeberg Municipality
(1986-1991)

Coat of arms of Spydeberg Municipality
(1978-2019)

Coat of arms of Trøgstad Municipality
(1979-2019)

Coat of arms of Tune Municipality
(1977-1991)

Coat of arms of Varteig Municipality
(1979-1991)
