= HV-016 =

Former military unit of Norway

Insignia of HV-016

The Home Guard Special Division 016 (Norwegian: Heimevernets spesialavdeling 016; abbreviated as HV-016) is a former military unit of Norway, that was a part of the Home Guard. It was established after 1985 to "stop terror- or sabotage actions that could weaken or paralyze Norway's ability to mobilize its military and its ability to resist".

It was decommissioned on 1 January 2011. Investigation after the 2011 Norway attacks, revealed that only parliament had the authority to have the unit decommissioned, but the matter was brought to parliament after the fact.

== Background ==
Formed in 1987 as a result of the possible threat posed by the Russian Spetsnaz, HV-016 (also informally known as HV-SPES) was an elite unit of the Norwegian Home Guard. The unit had detachments based in the 4 largest cities in Norway; Oslo, Trondheim, Bergen and Stavanger. Not a special forces unit per se, as the operators are not full-time employed in the unit, but it does participate in numerous exercises throughout the course of a year.

When the Home Guard was re-structured in 2005, HV-016 was made part of the newly formed I-Styrken, or Innsatsstyrken (Rapid Response Unit).

The unit was disbanded by the Norwegian government in September 2010.

== Resources ==
HV-016 specialized in close protection of key military personnel and assets, CQB (Close Quarter Battle), and direct, offensive action.

The soldiers all had personlig sambandsmiddel (communication handset), and the officers and sergeants had weapons (with all operational parts – komplette våpen) and ammunition (treningsammunisjon) stored in their homes.".

== Training ==
Sharpshooting from moving helicopters had been trained during training exercises in Denmark in 2007, 2008 and 2010 – the "Sniper training Falcon Eye" training maneuvers (øvelse).

In 2006, during an unannounced training maneuver, 40 soldiers from the unit were able to muster battle-ready in "an hour and a half".

== Selection and personnel ==
The soldiers were recruited among people who have finished their conscript duty in the Norwegian armed forces, and many of them have experience from international operations with other branches of the Norwegian forces, such as Telemark Battalion. Some also stem from Marinejegerkommandoen and Hærens Jegerkommando, the two special forces units in the Norwegian military.

The applicants go through a four-day selection period with a following two-week basic course for the ones who pass. After this, the cadets commence the regular exercises with the unit for 6 months before being considered full members.

The exact organization of HV-016 is not publicly known. Also, the number of, and identities of its operators, are kept secret.

== After decommissioning ==
By January 2011, 94% of its former personnel in Oslo, Stavanger and Bergen gave up their contracts with Forsvaret, protesting what they considered an unfair and irrational process by military leadership.

After the 2011 attacks Norway is considering to re-establish an anti-terror unit of the Home Guard, Aftenposten wrote in November 2011.

=== Review by Office of the Auditor General ===
On December 12, 2011 media reported that the decommissioning of the unit will be investigated by the Office of the Auditor General. (3 years earlier, the same agency found "a lack of tracibility within the documentation for significant decisions" at the defence ministry.)

== See also ==
- Directives for Military Officers and Ministry Officials upon an Attack of Norway
