= Norwegian Armed Forces =

Armed forces of Norway

- Forsvaret
- Coat of arms
- Motto: "For alt vi har. Og alt vi er." (For all we have. And all we are.)
- Founded: 1628
- Current form: 1990
- Service branches: Norwegian Army; Royal Norwegian Navy; Norwegian Coast Guard; Royal Norwegian Air Force; Home Guard; Cyber Defence Force
- Headquarters: Norwegian Joint Headquarters
- Website: Official website

Leadership
- King: Haakon VIII
- Prime Minister: Jonas Gahr Støre
- Minister of Defence: Tore O. Sandvik
- Chief of Defence: General Eirik Kristoffersen

Personnel
- Military age: Male: 17-44 (55 for officers) years of age for compulsory military service. Female: 17 years of age for military service. Compulsory for females born in 2000 or later.
- Conscription: 19-month service obligation.
- Active personnel: 33,440 (2024)
- Reserve personnel: 40,500 in the Norwegian Home Guard (2019) 20,100 in the army reserve
- Deployed personnel: 384 (2019)

Expenditure
- Budget: 110.1 billion. NOK; ~ 10,8 billion US-Dollar (2025)
- Percent of GDP: 2.16 % (2025)

Related articles
- History: Military history of Norway
- Ranks: Ranks and insignia

The Norwegian Armed Forces (Norwegian: Forsvaret, lit. 'The Defence') are the armed forces responsible for the defence of Norway. It consists of five branches, the Norwegian Army, the Royal Norwegian Navy, which includes the Coast Guard, the Royal Norwegian Air Force, the Home Guard, and Norwegian Cyber Defence Force as well as several joint departments.

The military force in peacetime is around 17,185 personnel including military and civilian staff, and around 70,000 in total with the current military personnel, conscripts and the Norwegian Home Guard in full mobilization.

Among European NATO members, the military expenditure of US$7.2 billion is the highest per capita.

== History ==
An organised military was first assembled in Norway in the 9th century and its early focus was naval warfare. The army was created in 1628 as part of Denmark–Norway, followed by two centuries of regular wars. A Norwegian military was established in 1814, but the military did not see combat until the German occupation of Norway in 1940. Norway abandoned its position as a neutral country in 1949 to become a founding member of the North Atlantic Treaty Organization (NATO). The Cold War saw a large build-up of air stations and military bases, especially in Northern Norway. Since the 2000s, the military has transformed from a focus on defence from an invasion to a mobile force for international missions.

Norway had its combat units withdraw from the War in Afghanistan in 2021. During the war, Norwegian combat forces had been on loan to ISAF, and later on loan to Resolute Support Mission.

== Organisation ==
The formal commander-in-chief is King Haakon VIII; however, the de facto supreme decision-making is made by the Cabinet, led by the Prime Minister. The Chief of Defence (a four-star general or admiral) is the professional head and leader of the armed forces, and is the principal military adviser to the Minister of Defence. The Chief of Defence and his staff is located at Akershus Fortress in Oslo, while the Norwegian Joint Headquarters, responsible for commanding operations, is located in Bodø. The main naval base is Haakonsvern in Bergen Municipality, the main army camps are located at Setermoen in Bardu Municipality, Bardufoss in Målselv Municipality, and Rena in Åmot Municipality. The main air station is Ørland Main Air Station in Ørland Municipality.

Military branches (in order of seniority):

- Norwegian Army
- Royal Norwegian Navy
- Royal Norwegian Air Force
- Home Guard
- Norwegian Cyber Defence Force
- Norwegian Special Operation Forces (NORSOF)

Other main structures include:

- Defence Staff Norway (DEFSTNOR) in Oslo acts as the staff of the Chief of Defence. It is headed by a three-star general or admiral. DEFSTNOR assigns priorities, manages resources, provides force generation and support activities. Each of the four branches of defence is headed by a two-star general/admiral who are subordinate to DEFSTNOR.
- Norwegian Joint Headquarters (NJHQ) located at Reitan, close to Bodø has operational control of Norwegian armed forces worldwide 24/7. It is headed by the Supreme Commander Norwegian Forces – a three-star general or admiral.
- Norwegian Defence Logistics Organisation (NDLO) at Kolsås in Bærum Municipality (just outside Oslo) is responsible for engineering, procurement, investment, supply, information and communications technology. It is also responsible for the maintenance, repair and storage of materials.

== Conscription ==
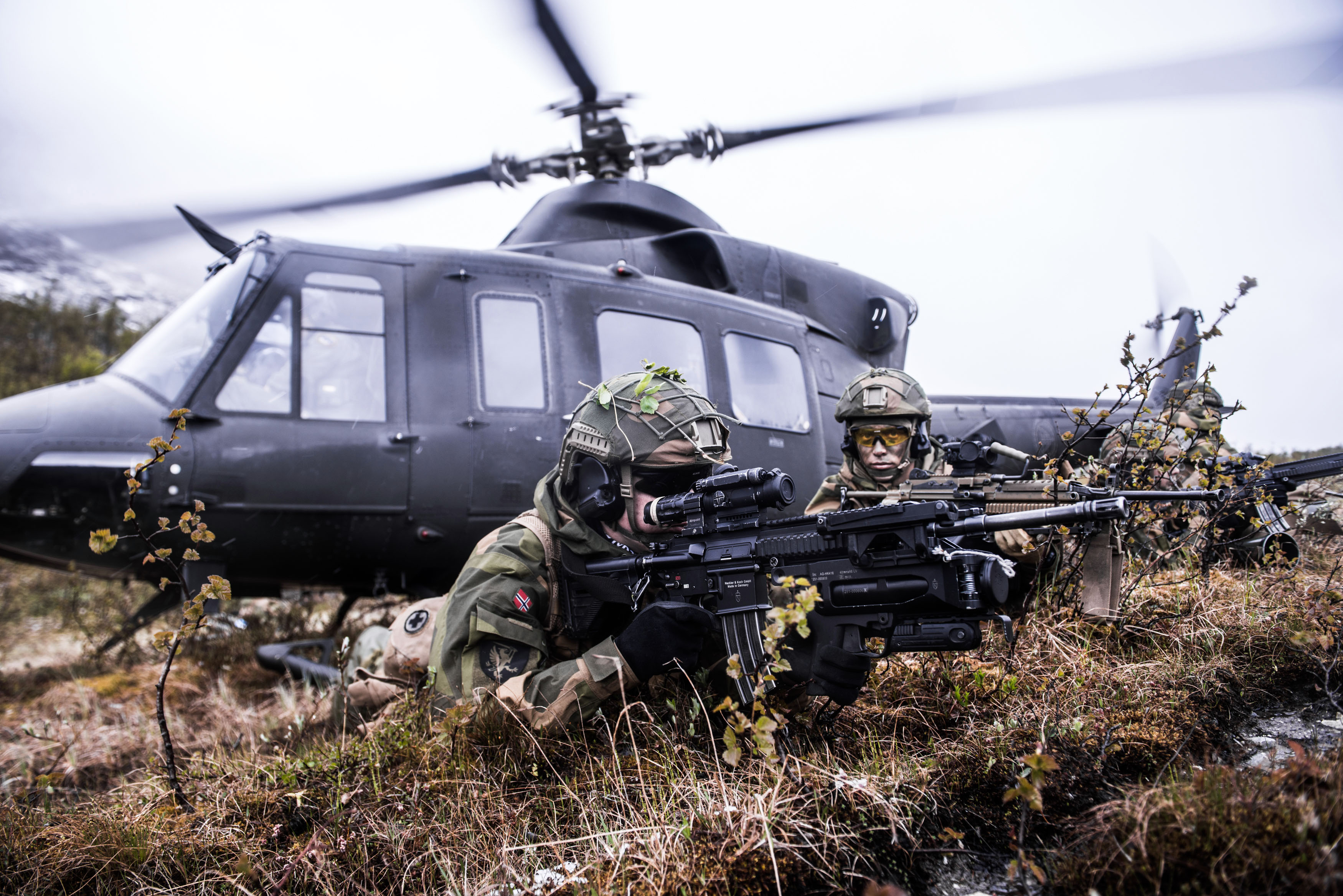
Brigade soldiers at an exercise

Conscription was constitutionally established on 12 April 1907 with Kongeriket Norges Grunnlov § 119. In earlier times, up until at least the early 2000s, all men aged 19–44 were subject to mandatory service, with good reasons required to avoid becoming drafted. Norway currently employs a weak form of mandatory military service for men and women. For example, in 2010, while 62,873 men and women were called to be examined as persons eligible for military service (the examination being mandatory for men), only 9,631 were actually conscripted. In practice, not all recruits deemed eligible for conscription are forced to serve, with only those who are judged the most motivated actually being selected.

Since 1985, women have been able to enlist for voluntary service as regular recruits. On 14 June 2013, the Norwegian Parliament voted to extend conscription to women. In 2015 conscription was extended to women making Norway the first NATO member and first European country to make national service compulsory for both men and women. In 2020, women made up one-third of new conscripts.

There is a right of conscientious objection.

Students of professional subjects (doctors, psychologists, pharmacists, dentists, etc.) may serve their conscription after completing a six weeks course, receiving lieutenant ranking when they begin their service. This arrangement is called Conscript Academic Officer (Norwegian: Vernepliktige akademikere (VA)).

In 2020, the media said that "several soldiers said that they were informed about additional four months of service; the information was given after military service had started".

== Structure ==
=== Joint ===
- Norwegian Joint Headquarters in Bodø
- Norwegian Intelligence Service
- Tactical Mobile Land/Maritime Command
- Joint ISTAR Unit (Intelligence, Surveillance, Target Acquisition and Reconnaissance)
  - Module based ISTAR Unit
  - Norwegian Coastal Ranger Command (Kystjegerkommandoen in Norwegian)
  - Unmanned aerial vehicle capability
- Airborne Ground Surveillance (joint NATO project)
- Norwegian Home Guard – 12 districts with 40,500 personnel, rapid reaction forces, follow-on-forces, reinforcement forces and reserves.
- Capacity for information operations
- Norwegian Defence Security Department (NORDSD)
- Flexible medical units
- NRBC protection (Nuclear, radiological, biological, chemical weapons)
- Explosive Ordnance Disposal
- Joint C2I Unit (command, control and information)
- Civil Military Coordination Unit (CIMIC)
- Deployable logistical support
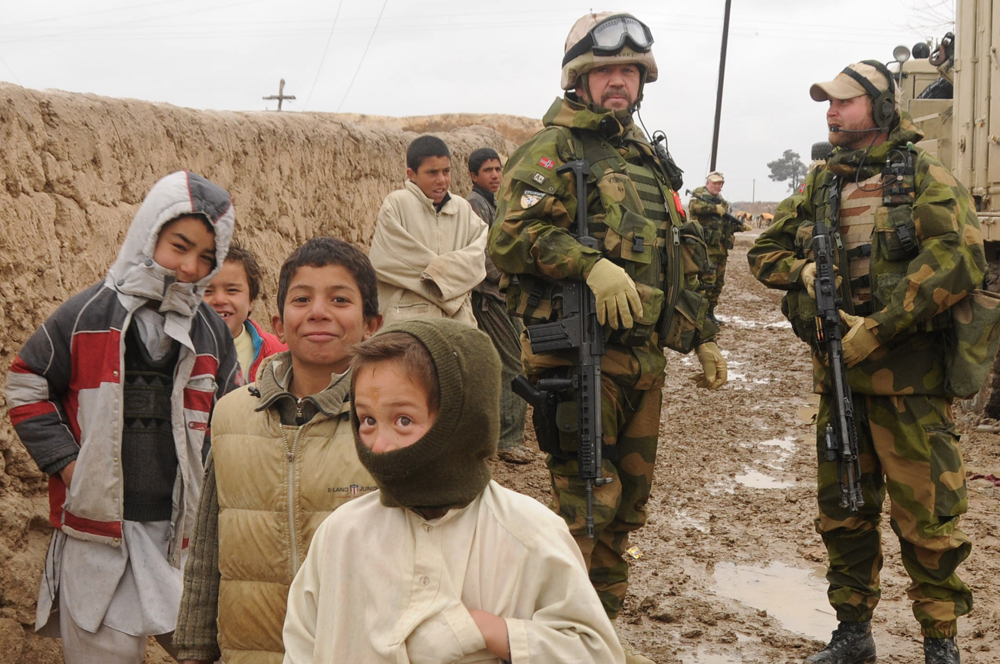
- Norwegian ISAF soldiers in Afghanistan in 2009
  2 mobilisation host country battalions (logistics for allied reinforcements)

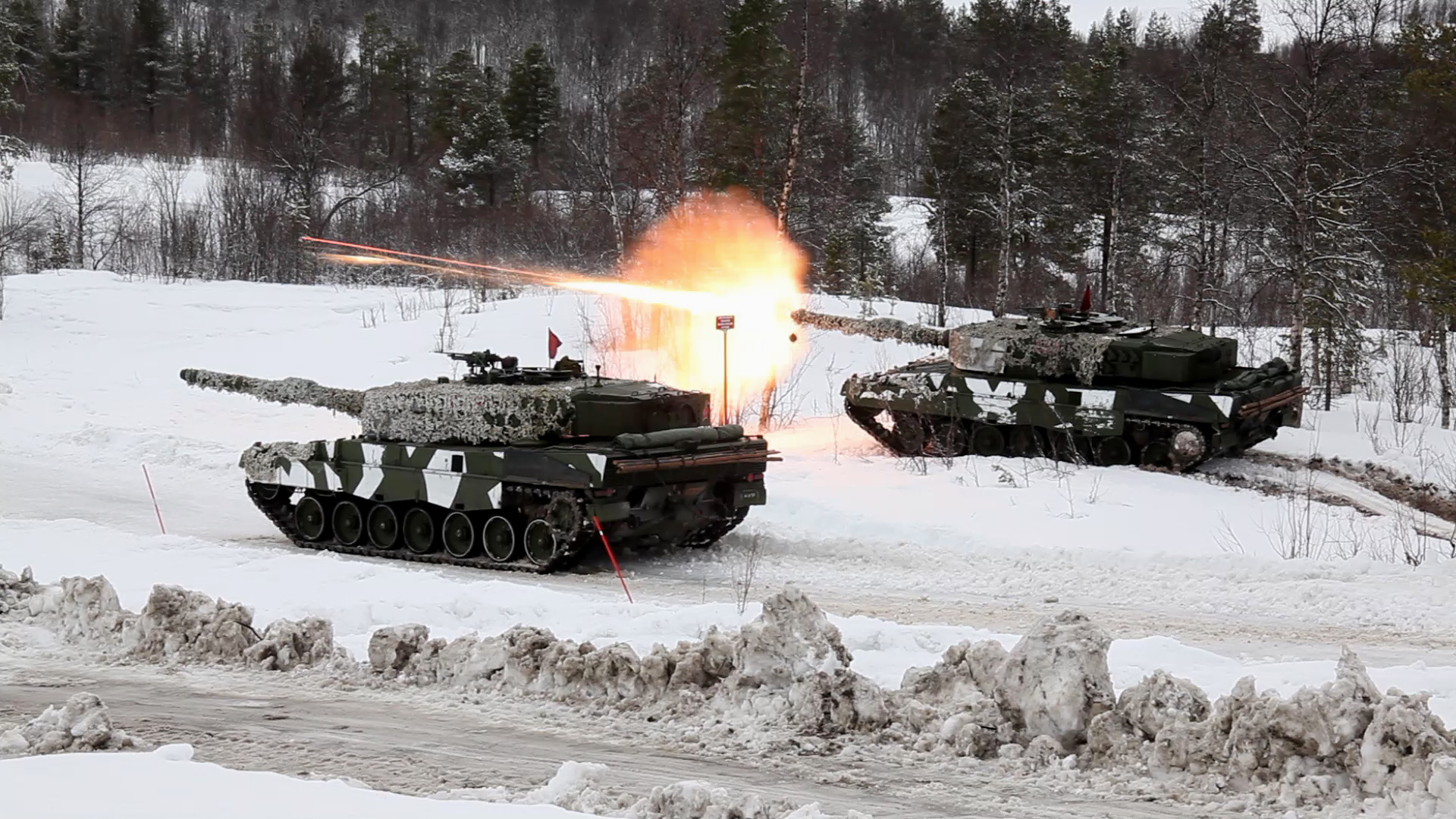
Norwegian Leopard 2 on 14 March 2014

=== Norwegian Army ===
From 1 August 2023 the Norwegian Army has this structure:

- Brigade Nord (operational units)
  - Armoured Battalion (Norwegian: Panserbataljonen, 1.Bn), in Setermoen with Leopard 2A4NO main battle tanks and CV90 infantry fighting vehicles
  - 2nd Battalion (Norwegian: 2. bataljon), mechanized infantry in Skjold with Bandvagn 206 vehicles
  - Telemark Battalion (Norwegian: Telemark bataljon), in Rena with Leopard 2A4NO main battle tanks and CV90 infantry fighting vehicles
    A Norwegian military police officer during a NATO exercise in 2014
  - Artillery Battalion (Norwegian: Artilleribataljonen), in Setermoen with K9 Thunder self-propelled howitzers
  - Combat Engineer Battalion (Norwegian: Ingeniørbataljonen), in Skjold
  - Signals Battalion (Norwegian: Sambandsbataljonen), in Bardufoss
  - Medical Battalion (Norwegian: Sanitetsbataljonen), in Setermoen
  - Combat Service Support Battalion (Norwegian: Stridstrenbataljonen), in Bardufoss
  - Military Police Company (Norwegian: Militærpolitikompaniet), in Bardufoss
- Finnmarksbrigaden
  - Porsanger Battalion
  - Ranger Battalion GSV
  - Finnmark heimevernsdistrikt 17 - part of Norwegian Home Guard
- Army Land Warfare Centre
- His Majesty the King's Guard
- Logistics and Operational Support
- Operation Support Detachment

=== Royal Norwegian Navy ===
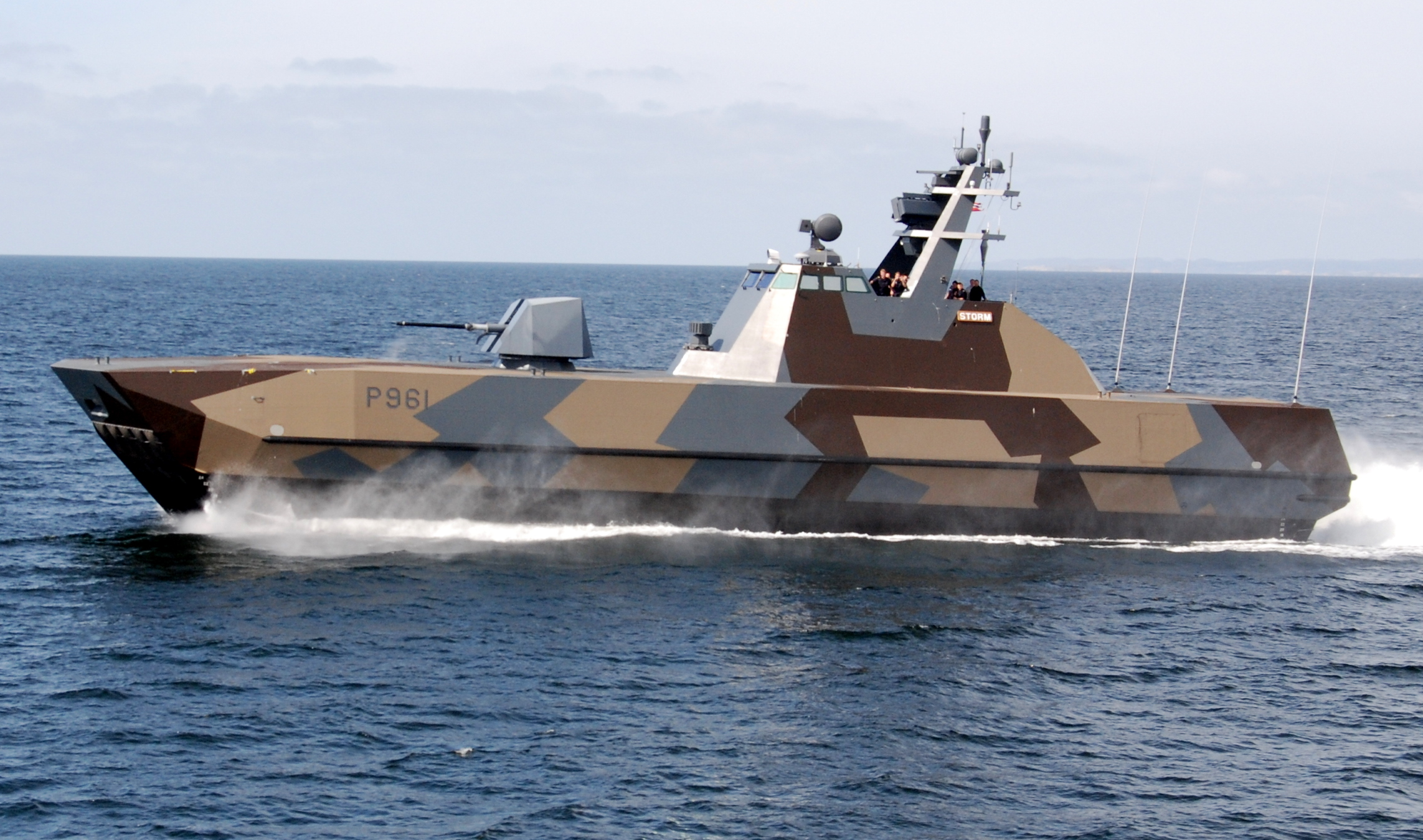
A Norwegian Skjold-class fast missile boat

- 4 Fridtjof Nansen-class Aegis frigates
- 6 Skjold-class fast missile boats.
- 6 Ula-class submarines
- Mine Warfare Capability
  - 6 (8) Oksøy-class mine hunters and Alta-class minesweepers
- Norwegian Coastal Ranger Command
  - Tactical Boat Squadron (CB90-class fast assault craft)
- Norwegian Naval EOD Command (divers)
- Fleet Logistics Command
  - Supply ship Maud
  - Royal yacht Norge
  - Magnus Lagabøte
  - Olav Trygvasson
- Coast Guard
  - 1 Svalbard-class vessel
  - 3 Barentshav class vessels
  - 3 Nordkapp-class offshore patrol vessel
  - Leased vessels (NoCGV Tromsø and KV Ålesund, KV Harstad, 6 ocean patrol vessels)
  - Inner coast guard (25 leased vessels)
  - Tug capacity

=== Royal Norwegian Air Force ===
- 49 Lockheed Martin F-35A Lightning II (52 ordered)
- 74 General dynamics F16A/B and AM/AB 30 jets still active soon to be retired
- 2 Air Control Centre/Recognized Air picture Production Centre/Sensor Fusion post (ARS Sørreisa and ARS Mågerø)
- Strategic Airlift / Aerial refueling (common NATO projects)
- Maritime surveillance 5 P-8 Poseidon.)
- Transport 5x C-130J Super Hercules
- Air Defence (NASAMS 3)
- Air Wing for Special Forces (6 x Bell 412)
- 18+ Bell 412 transport helicopters
- Deployable base support
- 16 AW101 search and rescue helicopter (replaced 12 Sea King helicopters)

=== Norwegian Home Guard ===
- Home Guard

=== Norwegian Cyber Defence Force ===
- Norwegian Cyber Defence Force

=== Norwegian Special Forces ===
The Norwegian Special Operations Command (NORSOCOM) (Forsvarets Spesialstyrker (FS), was formed on 1 January 2014 by bringing the Special Operations Command (FSK), The army's special warfare unit, and the Naval Special Operations Command (MJK), The navy's special warfare unit, together under a unified command.

NORSOCOM (Forsvarets Spesialstyrker (FS)), Akershus Fortress, Oslo

- Chief of NORSOCOM, a two-star officer, member of the Commander of the Armed Forces's management group
- Taktisk Kommando (TAKOM) - special forces-specific command element embedded with the Norwegian Joint Headquarters (FOH)) outside Bodø.
- Special Operations Commando (Norwegian: Forsvarets Spesialkommando) (FSK), at Rena Army Camp, part of Østerdal Garrison
  - FSK Staff
  - unknown number of combat squadrons
  - Paratrooper Platoon - platoon consisting of conscripts highly trained for raid and airborne ISTAR operations.
  - Ranger Platoon - special reconnaissance training unit made up of female conscripts
  - Initial and Operational Special Forces Training Base on the tiny islet of Vealøs facing the former Karljohansvern Naval Base in Horten Municipality
- Naval Special Operations Commando (Norwegian: Marinejegerkommandoen) (MJK), at Jaeger's Bight in Haakonsvern Naval Base, near Bergen. A research paper of the Norwegian Defence Research Establishment puts the force structure of the MJK at a staff and six combat squadrons
  - MJK Staff
  - Alfa Squadron - combat divers squadron, Norway's premier naval special warfare unit
  - Bravo Squadron - combat divers squadron, entry unit for recent graduates of the frogmen training course
  - Reconnaissance Squadron - special reconnaissance and intelligence unit
  - Echo Squadron - special boat squadron
  - Lima Squadron - combat support squadron
  - Training Squadron, at Ramsund Naval War Station in Tjeldsund Municipality
- 339 Special Operations Aviation Squadron (339 Skvadron) (339 SKV), at Rygge Air Station and Bardufoss Air Station, flying Bell 412SP helicopters, providing air support to the special forces. Being an air force unit, chief NORSOCOM executes tactical command of 339 SOAS.
- Special Operations Air Task Group (SOATG), at Rygge Air Station, providing operational planning, command and control for Norwegian Air Force assets deployed in support of special operations.

=== Norwegian Defence University College ===
The Norwegian Defence University College (NDUC) (Norwegian: Forsvarets høgskole) is the institution in charge of officer and NCO training, re-qualification and military studies. The officer schools of the separate armed services are departments under NDUC and thus independent from their respective services. The central administration of the NDUC is located at the historic Akershus Fortress in the city center of Oslo.

==== Leadership ====
Chief of the NDUC

The NDUC is headed by the Chief of the NDUC (sjef FHS, also referred to as rektor), a two-star rank.

Leading Group

The Chief of the NDUC is assisted by the Leading Group (or the Leader's Group, Ledergruppen), composed of the NDUC's Chief of Staff (stabssjef), the officer in charge of academic work (dekan), the chiefs of the Military Academy (Krigsskolen, the army officer school), the Air Force Academy (Luftkrigsskolen, the air force officer school) and the Naval Academy (Sjøkrigsskolen, the naval officer school), the Chief of the Cyber Engineer Academy (Cyberingeniørskolen, the recently established Cyber Defence branch's officer school), the Chief of the NCO School (Befalsskolen, joint for the armed forces), the directors of the two institutes for military studies and the NDUC's Command Sergeant Major (sjefssersjant).

Managing Board

The Managing Board of the NDUC (Høgskolestyret) is the governing body and it includes the Chief of the NDUC, The chiefs of the Army (Hæren), Navy (Sjøforsvaret) and the Air Force (Luftforsvaret), three members of the board (tre ansattrepresentanter), one external (audit) member of the board (ekstern representant) and one student (cadet or civilian) member of the board (studentrepresentant).

NDUC HS Administration

The NDUC Administration is composed of two staffs (administrative staff (Driftsstab) and academic work staff (Fagstab).

==== Departments ====
The following departments form the AFHS:

Norwegian National Defence Staff College

The Norwegian National Defence Staff College (FHS Stabsskolen) is located in the Akershus Fortress and provides education in general military studies, common to the services, such as strategic military leadership, international peacekeeping operations, Military-Civilian Cooperation etc. It offers Bachelor and Masters programs as well as advanced academic programs.

Defence Intelligence College

The Defence Intelligence College (Språk- og etterretningsskolen) is located at the Lutvann Barracks (Lutvann leir) in Oslo and the intelligence officer course is a three-year Bachelor program.

Norwegian Military Academy

The Norwegian Military Academy (Krigsskolen) is the Norwegian army officer school, located at the Linderud Barracks (Linderud leir) in Oslo. It provides officer training and professional development, as well as a NCO training program for high school students (videregående befalsutdanning).

Air Force Academy

The Air Force Academy (Luftkrigsskolen) is the Norwegian air force officer school, located in the Kuhaugen area in Trondheim Municipality. It provides officer training and professional development, as well as a NCO training program for high school students (videregående befalsutdanning).

Naval Academy

The Naval Academy (Sjøkrigsskolen) is the Norwegian navy officer school, located in the Laksevåg area in Bergen Municipality. It provides officer training and professional development, as well as a NCO training program for high school students (videregående befalsutdanning).

Cyber Engineer Academy

The Cyber Engineer Academy (Cyberingeniørskolen) is the Norwegian Cyber Defence Force officer school, located at the Jørstadmoen Barracks (Jørstadmoen leir) in Fåberg in Lillehammer Municipality. It provides training for officer training in communication and information system operations.

NCO School

The NCO School (Befalsskolen) is a joint institution, training sergeants for all the services. It is located at the Sessvollmoen Barracks (Sessvollmoen leir) in Sessvollmoen near Oslo - Gardermoen IAP. The school was established in 2019 by merging the NCO school of the army (Hærens befalsskole), navy (Befalsskolen for Sjøforsvaret), air force (Luftforsvarets flygeskole), engineering services (Forsvarets ingeniørhøgskole), military intelligence service (Forsvarets etterretningshøgskole) and the Home Guard (Heimevernets befalsskole).

==== Centers ====
Institute for Defence Studies

The Institute for Defence Studies (Institutt for forsvarsstudier) is located at the Akershus Fortress. It is organised in four centres: Centre for Norwegian and European Security, Centre for Civil-Military Relations, Centre for Asian Studies and Centre for Transatlantic Studies

Armed Forces Higher School Strategic Course

The Strategic Course (FSH / Sjefskurs) trains senior military officers and high-ranking government officials in strategic military command and national security studies. It uses the education resources of the Institute for Defence Studies, but it is independent from it, directly subordinated to the Chief of the AFHS.

== Small arms and handguns ==
- Heckler & Koch MP5 – replaced by the MP7 in most positions, used by parts of the Home Guard
- Heckler & Koch MP7 – standard issue SMG
- Heckler & Koch HK416 – standard assault rifle
- Heckler & Koch HK417 – designated marksman rifle
- Colt Canada C8SFW – special forces only
- Barrett M82
- Barrett MRAD
- Glock 17 – standard issue pistol, replaced by the MP7 in some positions
- Heckler & Koch USP – in use with special forces
- Rheinmetall MG3 – partly replaced by FN Minimi and Minimi 7,62 Mk3 as crew weapon
- FN Minimi
- Minimi 7,62 Mk3
- M2 Browning
- M72 LAW – light anti-armour weapon
- Carl Gustav recoilless rifle – anti-armour weapon
- FGM-148 Javelin – anti-armour guided missile
- M320 Grenade Launcher Module
