= Bergenhus Regiment =

- Active: 1628–2002
- Country: Norway
- Branch: Norwegian Army
- Type: Infantry
- Battle honours: Stene gård 1658; Trondhjem 1658; Halden 1660; Vænersborg 1676; Marstrand-Carlsten 1677; Jasmund-Neutief 1715; Moss 1716; Dynekilen 1716; Fredriksten 1718; Marstrand-Carlsten 1719; Berby 1808; Vosseavsnittet 1940; Valdres 1940

The Bergenhus Regiment was a Norwegian Army infantry regiment located in the counties of Hordaland and Sogn og Fjordane. It was first formed in 1628 and finally disbanded in 2002. In 2006 it was decided that as the Norwegian Home Guard has taken over both the territorial responsibility and recruitment area of the old regiments they are recognised as their successors. Thus battle honours and history has been transferred to them and new banners based on the old regimental colours were created to reflect that. The history of Bergenhus Regiment is carried on by Bergenhus Heimevernsdistrikt 09 and Møre og Fjordane Heimevernsdistrikt 11.

== Introduction ==
Bergenhus Regiment was first raised in 1628 as part of the Danish King Christian IV's plan to create a Norwegian army. Most armies of that time had in their ranks large proportions of mercenaries, expensive troops to maintain and sometimes of questionable loyalty. Thus by raising an army that was to manned by his own rural subjects he wished to create an organization that would be loyal, could quickly be put on a war-footing and that could serve his interest, both in war and peace.

To recruit men for this army all farms in the realm from Båhus in the south to Trøndelag in the central north was organized into the "legd"-system. A "legd" consisted of four full farms, which together would provide and equip a single soldier.

The initial strength of the army consisted of five regiments:

- Trondhjemske Regiment
- Bergenhusiske Regiment
- Tunsberghusiske Regiment
- Akershusiske Regiment
- Bohus Regiment

There were also three independent companies:

- Jämtlands Kompani
- Stavanger lens Fahnlein
- Agdesidens Fahnlein

== Baptism of fire and the growth of an institution (1628-1700) ==
Despite the initial ambitious plans for the creation and further expansion of the Norwegian army, the costs proved too much at the time for any proper organization and fielding of the planned army. Because of this it remained mostly a paper organization until around 1640 when the threat of war loomed on the horizon. The lower ranks had until then been on the rolls, assigned and sometimes trained but the required number of officer were sorely lacking. With the new situation arising in 1640 the number of companies in the regiment was raised from four to six and a number of new officers were hired to fill the vacant positions in the regiment.

== Various ==
Regimental Names
Det Bergenhusiske Regiment	Bergenhus Regiment	1628	–	1718
1ste Bergenhusiske Regiment til fots	1st Bergenhus Foot Regiment	1718	–	1789
2dre Bergenhusiske Regiment til fots	2nd Bergenhus Foot Regiment	1718	–	1789
Det Bergenhusiske Regiment	Bergenhus Regiment	1789	–	1817
Den Bergenhusiske Skarpskytterbataljon	Bergenhus Sharpshooter Battalion	1810	–	1817
4de Bergenhusiske Brigade	4th Bergenhus Brigade	1817	–	1911
Søndre Bergenhus Infanteriregiment Nr.9	Southern Bergenhus Infantry Regiment Nr.9	1911	–	1930
Nordre Bergenhus Infanteriregiment Nr.10	Northern Bergenhus Infantry Regiment Nr.10	1911	–	1930
Hordaland Infanteriregiment Nr.9	Hordaland Infantry Regiment Nr.9	1930	–	1995
Fjordane Infanteriregiment Nr.10	Fjordane Infantry Regiment Nr.10	1930	–	1995
Bergenhus Regiment	Bergenhus Regiment	1995	–	2002
Fjordane Regiment	Fjordane Regiment	1995	–	2002 koben grenadier

(Periods when the original regiment was divided into several separate units as a result of army re-organizations are shown with the designations of all these units listed.)

Battle Honours
Stene gård	1658
Trondhjem	1658
Halden	1660
Vænersborg	1676
Marstrand-Carlsten	1677
Jasmund-Neutief	1715
Moss	1716
Dynekilen	1716
Fredriksten	1718
Marstrand-Carlsten	1719
Berby	1808
Vosseavsnittet	1940
Valdres	1940

== See also ==
- Allied campaign in Norway
- Great Northern War
- Great Northern War and Norway
- Gunboat War
- List of Danish wars
- List of Swedish wars
- Norway in 1814
- Norwegian Army
- Operation Weserübung
- Swedish campaign against Norway (1814)
