= Roar Sundseth =

Norwegian Army officer

Personal details
- Born: March 1, 1954 Melhus, Norway
- Died: July 16, 2015 (aged 61) Trondheim, Norway

Military service
- Allegiance: Norway
- Branch/service: Norwegian Army; Norwegian Cyber Defence Force
- Years of service: 1972–2013
- Rank: Generalmajor

Roar Sundseth (1954–2015) was a Norwegian Army major general and cybersecurity specialist. He played a key role in the establishment of the Norwegian Cyber Defence Force and served as its first chief.

== Biography ==
In 1972, Sundseth became a non-commissioned officer in the signal corps of the Norwegian Army. After completing his training in Norway, he also studied in the United States. In 2002, he received a master's degree in strategic studies from the United States Army War College. He also attended the NATO Defense College.

From 2002 to 2003, Sundseth was assigned as a Norwegian attaché to CENTCOM at MacDill Air Force Base. Upon returning to Norway, he served at the Norwegian Ministry of Defence from 2003 to 2006.

Sundseth was concerned that the rapid development of information technology in the 21st century would give rise to a new virtual domain of warfare for which Norway was not prepared. As a result, he was one of a number of advocates for the creation of an independent cyberwarfare service within the Norwegian military.

In 2012, the Norwegian Cyber Defence Force was established and Sundseth was appointed as its first chief. He served in this position until his retirement at the end of 2013. He was also involved in the establishment of the Centre for Cyber and Information Security (CCIS) at the Norwegian University of Science and Technology.

Sundseth divided cyber threat actors into three categories: ordinary cybercriminals, ideological hacktivist groups such as Anonymous, and state-sponsored advanced persistent threats.

After retiring from the military, Sundseth worked as a strategic advisor in the private sector. He died suddenly in 2015.

== Bibliography ==
- Hämmerli, Bernhard; Lopez, Javier; Svendsen, Nils K., eds. (2013). Proceedings of the 7th International Workshop on Critical Information Infrastructures Security. Germany: Springer. ISBN 9783642414855.
