= HNoMS Tyr =

Three ships of the Royal Norwegian Navy have borne the name HNoMS Tyr, after the Old Norse god of single combat, victory and heroic glory Týr:

- HNoMS Tyr (1887) was a Gor-class Rendel gunboat. She was launched in 1887, captured by the Germans in 1940, returned to Norway in 1945 and sold into civilian service shortly thereafter.
- HNoMS Tyr (N47) was the ex-American Auk-class minesweeper USS Sustain (AM-119). She was launched on 23 June 1942, and transferred to the Royal Norwegian Navy on 1 October 1959.
- HNoMS Tyr (N50) was a mine control vessel used for underwater search and recovery by the Royal Norwegian Navy from 1995 to 2014.
