= Coat of arms of Oslo =

The coat of arms (actually the seal) of Oslo

The COA featured on the city's flag

The Oslo logo with the new simplified seal, introduced in 2019

Oslo is one of the cities in Norway, along with Bergen, Halden, Kristiansand and formerly Tønsberg, that has a city seal defined as its coat of arms. The Seal of Oslo is officially regarded by the city government as its coat of arms. It depicts the city's patron saint, St. Hallvard. The seal shows St. Hallvard with his attributes, the millstone and arrows, with a nude woman by his feet. He is seated on a throne with lion decorations, which at the time was also commonly used in the seals of Norwegian kings. Around the circular image the city's motto is inscribed: Unanimiter et constanter (United and constant).

The oldest known seal of Oslo showed the same composition as today's design, except that instead of a female figure reclining at the feet of St. Hallvard, there was an armed warrior; one of the evil men who killed Hallvard, but was defeated by the saint. This seal was probably introduced around 1300 and was in use for nearly three centuries. Due to its bad state of preservation, the image was later misinterpreted as the woman whom Hallvard tried to defend. After the Reformation, the city continued to use the seal with the image of St. Hallvard. The second seal of Oslo dates from around 1590. It shows the same basic design, but the saint holds his attributes in the opposite hands. Also, the stars and some other smaller details were lost. This seal was used until around 1660.

At that time the city of Oslo had been destroyed in the fire of 1624, and King Christian IV ordered its relocation across the bay and renamed it Christiania. The Cathedral Church of St. Hallvard barely survived the fire, but was later abandoned and used as a quarry. By 1660 it had become a ruin, and the legend of St. Hallvard was no longer well known. The third seal made in 1659, now that of the relocated city of Christiana, still showed the same basic design, but the saint was transformed into a female figure, probably now perceived as an embodiment of Christiania. She still held the arrows and had a dead knight (with harness and helmet) lying at her feet. The millstone had become thinner and looked more like a ring. A new feature of this seal was the motto of the city surrounding the circular motif,

The female figure on the 1659 seal was reproduced as a motif on several cast iron stove plates produced by Norwegian iron foundries around 1770. These ovens found a large market in Denmark, and the female figure was by many Danes misinterpreted as the highly esteemed Queen Margaret I, who unified the three Kingdoms of Sweden, Norway, and Denmark. The three arrows were interpreted as symbols of the three kingdoms, and the ring as a symbol of their union. The defeated knight was thought to symbolise her opponent, Albrecht of Mecklenburg.

During the 18th and early 19th centuries, the image kept changing. The ring has been shown as a snake biting its own tail, the throne was replaced by a lion, and the warrior at Hallvard's feet definitely became a woman.

In 1854, A.T. Kaltenborn wrote about the Norwegian municipal arms and also described the medieval seal of Oslo. He recognised it as depicting the legend of St. Hallvard, but did not interpret the reclining figure correctly. He persuaded the city to have a new seal designed, based on the alleged medieval composition. Finally, a new design was made by the German Emil Doepler in 1892. His composition was also transformed to fit onto an escutcheon, designed in 1899 by Reidar Haavin, at a time when many Norwegian towns adopted coats of arms. In 1924, the present design was made, still inside a circular seal, and still with the incorrect woman instead of the original warrior at the feet of St. Hallvard, but now stark naked. It was redesigned and its colors defined in 2000 as part of a new design program for Oslo.

The flag of Oslo, introduced in 2000, includes the seal placed towards the left on a blue background.

A new visual design for Oslo was completed in 2019, and includes a new simplified seal, typically used on print and signage.
