= Reine-class patrol vessel =

Norwegian inshore patrol vessel

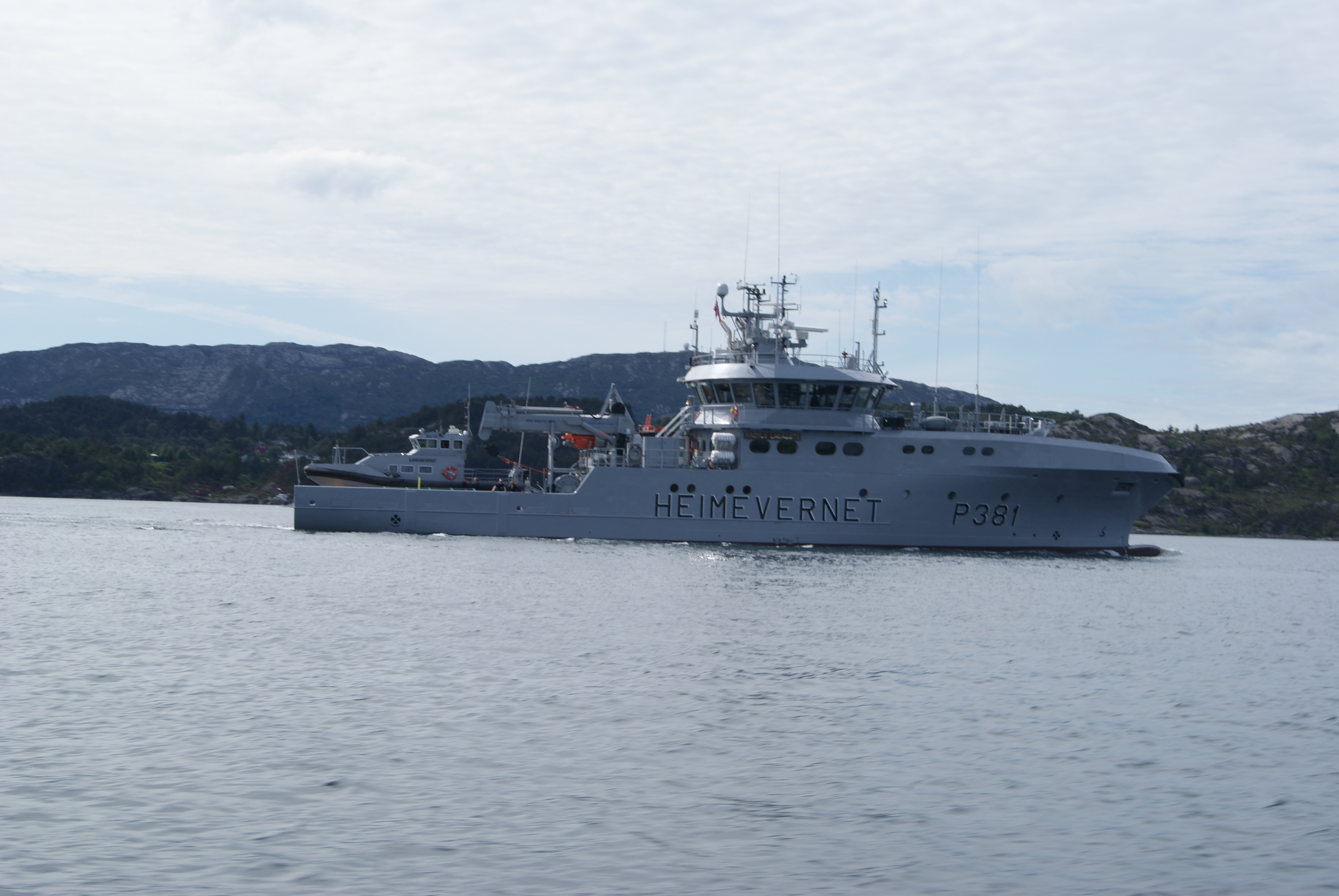
- Magnus Lagabote

Class overview
- Name: Reine class
- Builders: Gryfia shipyard, Szczecin, Poland
- Operators: (Norway) Sjøheimevernet; Royal Norwegian Navy
- In commission: 2010–present
- Planned: 2
- Completed: 2
- Active: 2

General characteristics
- Type: Patrol vessel
- Tonnage: 761 GT
- Displacement: 748 long tons (760 t)
- Length: 49.6 m (162 ft 9 in) o/a; 42 m (137 ft 10 in) p/p
- Beam: 10.3 m (33 ft 10 in)
- Draught: 3.25 m (10 ft 8 in)
- Depth: 5 m (16 ft 5 in)
- Propulsion: Diesel-electric, 2,900 kW (3,889 hp); 2 × Cummins KTA38 diesel generators; 1 × Cummins 7CTA-8.3D (M) diesel engine; 1 × Cummins KTA19 diesel engine; 2 × Schottel STP 1010 azimuth thrusters; 1 × 300 kW (402 hp) Schottel STT 1 bow thruster
- Speed: 12 knots (22 km/h; 14 mph) cruise; 16 knots (30 km/h; 18 mph) maximum
- Boats & landing craft carried: 1 × 6 m (20 ft) RHIB; 1 × 10.5 m (34 ft) RHIB
- Capacity: 120 m^{3} (4,200 cu ft) cargo deck area; 32 t (31 long tons) bollard pull
- Complement: 20
- Armament: 2 × 12.7 mm (0.50 in) machine guns

The Reine-class patrol vessel is a modified version of the Nornen-class patrol vessels. It is a Norwegian inshore patrol vessel designed for the specific needs of the Norwegian Sea Home Guard. It has the capacity to carry smaller patrol vessels and containers on board. The class is operated by the Royal Norwegian Navy, but also used as a platform for Home Guard training.

== Design ==
The Reine class consists of two vessels of the ST-610 L design by Skipsteknisk AS, built at the Gryfia shipyard in Szczecin, Poland. The vessels were ordered in 2007 and delivered in 2010 and 2011. The class constituted a new capacity for the Norwegian Sea Home Guard and was the first larger modern purpose built vessels in the fleet. They greatly expand the capacity of the smaller patrol crafts of the Hårek and Gyda classes.

== Ships in class ==
The vessels of the Reine class are named after Norwegian kings. The Norwegian prefix for the vessels were originally SHV short for Sjøheimevernet or "Sea Home Guard", but it was later changed, as they were transferred to the Norwegian Navy.

- SHV Olav Tryggvason (P380)
- SHV Magnus Lagabøte (P381)

In 2013, the two vessels in the Reine class were transferred from the Sea Home Guard to the Royal Norwegian Navy. As of July 2018, HNoMS Olav Trygvason (A536) and HNoMS Magnus Lagabøte (A537) are in use by the Naval Logistics Branch.
