= Norwegian Joint Headquarters =

Coordinates: 58°54′27″N 5°43′20″E

- Forsvarets operative hovedkvarter
- Founded: 2009; 17 years ago
- Country: Norway
- Allegiance: King Haakon VIII
- Branch: Norwegian Armed Forces
- Location: Reitan
- Website: Official website

Commanders
- Chief of Defence: General Eirik Kristoffersen
- NJHQ Commander: Lieutenant General Yngve Odlo

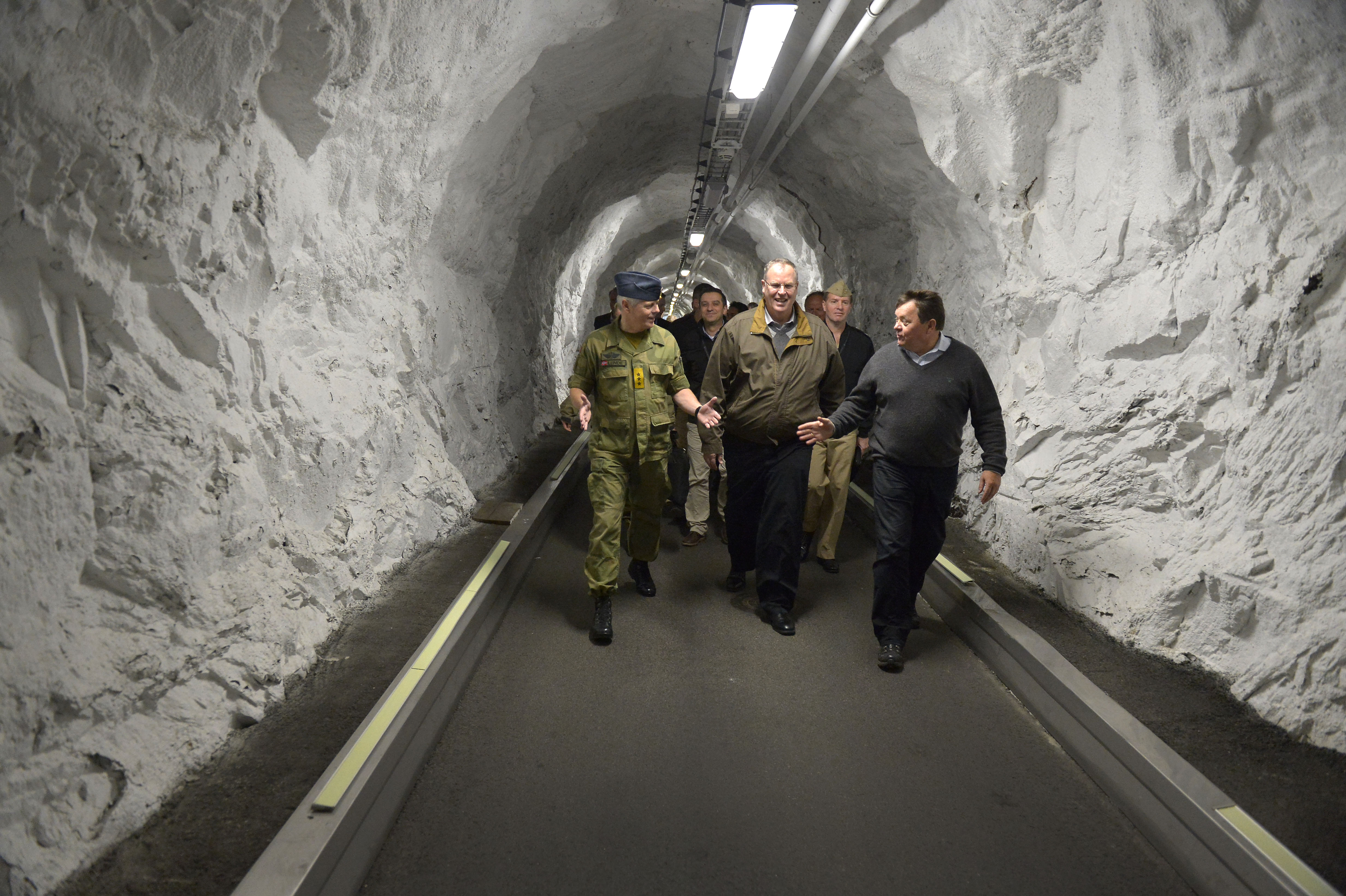
Deputy Secretary of Defense of the USA, Robert O. Work, gets a tour of The NJHQ by Air Marshal Morten Haga Lunde and Secretary of State Øystein Bø in 2015

The Norwegian Joint Headquarters, NJHQ (Norwegian: Forsvarets operative hovedkvarter, FOH) is the Norwegian Armed Forces operational commando-center. It is located at Reitan in Bodø Municipality, where during the Cold War NATO's Allied Command North Norway was based. The current organization was created on 1 August 2009, replacing a former joint commando center in Stavanger Municipality, which merged with the Northern Norway Command. It is led by chief-of-command, Lieutenant general, Yngve Odlo. His predecessor was Rune Jakobsen.

The Norwegian Armed Forces states that a total number of 500 people are somehow connected to the Commando Central. The Commando Central cooperates with Forsvarets Logistikkorganisasjon (Flo) and Cyberforsvaret (CYFOR) so that the Operational Headquarters may work as planned.

== Main tasks ==
- Keep an eye with Norway's vast sea and air territories, and have a current understanding of the overall situation.
- Exercise sovereignty in Norway's land, sea and air territories – and exercise national jurisdiction in these areas.
- Be present, and be able to handle crisis of any kind.
- Support civil society.
- Plan and lead military exercises.
- Provide control and support to Norwegian forces in international operations.

== Head ==
- 2009–2011: Lieutenant General Bernt Iver Ferdinand Brovold (Army)
- 2011–2013: Vice Admiral Haakon Bruun-Hansen (Navy)
- 2013–2015: Air Marshal Morten Haga Lunde (Air Force)
- 2015–2021: Lieutenant General Rune Jakobsen (Army)
- 2021–: Lieutenant General Yngve Odlo (Army)
