= Coat of arms of Bergen =

City seal of Bergen

The city seal of Bergen, Norway, consists of a wall with a gate that stands on golden hills. At the edge of the seal, the Latin text of "SIGILLUM COMMUNITATIS DE CIVITATE BERGENSI" is written, which translates to "Seal of the Town Community of Bergen". The elements date back to a two sided seal used in Bergen from 1293 to 1426. The current text was from the side of the seal which had the image of a longship, while the image was from the other side, which featured a castle. The old seal was replaced by a seal with a new castle as the main component in the 16th century. The seven hills below the castle have been interpreted as an image of Bergen's seven hills.

The current form has been used since 1833. Bergen is the only Norwegian municipality that has gotten approval of a city seal that dates back to a middle age seal.

The seal has similarities with 13th century seals of the German cities Lübeck and Hamburg, which were members of the Hanseatic League like Bergen.

== Historical city seals ==
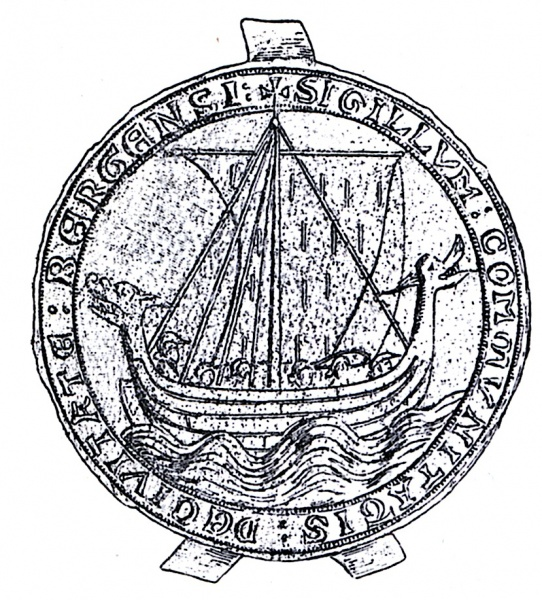
Longship city seal of Bergen, c. 1293.

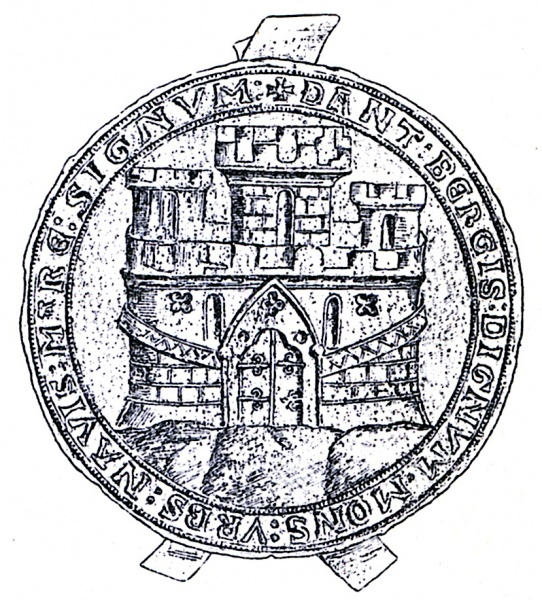
Castle city seal of Bergen, c. 1293.

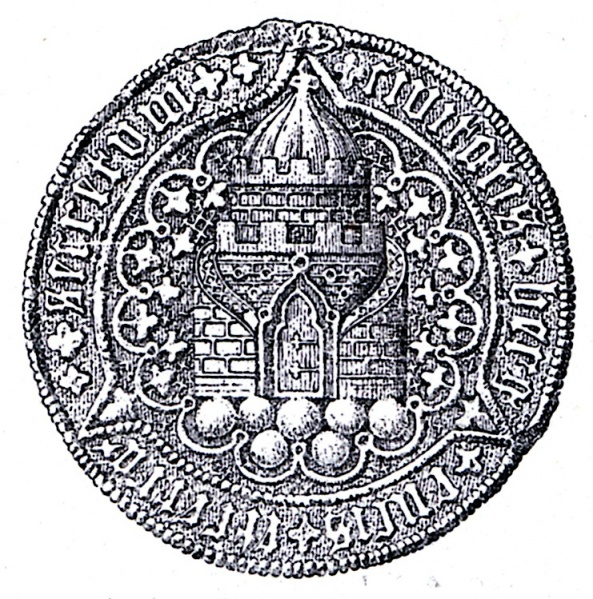
City seal of Bergen, 1531.

== Literature ==
- Hans Cappelen and Knut Johannessen: Norske kommunevåpen, Oslo 1987
