= HNoMS Valkyrien =

HNoMS Valkyrien, HNoMS Valkyrjen (in Norwegian the prefix KNM is used) has been the name of several ships in the Royal Norwegian Navy. Most of them have been in some way connected to the Royal Norwegian Navy's torpedo boats. The name honours the valkyries of Norse mythology. It has also been said that the ships have been given this name in honour of all women. Some of the ships:

- The Dano-Norwegian gunship Valkyrien. Launched 10 March 1810. Decommissioned in December 1814.
- Gun schooner Valkyrjen launched 1808 and decommissioned from the Royal Norwegian Navy in 1839.
- HNoMS Valkyrjen – Launched 1896.
- HNoMS Valkyrien (1953) – Formerly known as the passenger ship SS Polarlys
- HNoMS Valkyrien (1965) – Formerly known as HMCS Toronto and HNoMS Garm.
- HNoMS Valkyrien (A535) – The present support vessel for the Coastal Combat Flotilla.
