= Coat of arms of Hordaland =

Coat of arms of Hordaland

The coat of arms of Hordaland shows two golden axes and a crown in red. The initiative for a coat of arms for Hordaland was launched as early as 1918, but the county council waited until 1949 to officially start the process of adopting a coat of arms.

The following process took 12 years and the arms were officially granted on December 1, 1961. One or two axes had been used as a royal symbol on Norwegian coins for centuries and the Norwegian Heraldic Authority was considering reserving the crossed axe symbol for the Norwegian state but eventually released it to the county of Hordaland.

The arms are derived from the old seal of the guild of Saint Olav, King of Norway, from Onarheim in Tysnes Municipality. This seal was used by the delegates of Sunnhordland in 1344 on the document issued on July 17 of that year to install king Haakon V of Norway. It was thus the oldest symbol used for the region and adapted as the arms in 1961. The age of the guild is unknown but it is believed to have been in existence in the 10th century.

The seal was that of the Olavbrothers but was used by delegates to represent all the farmers and populace of Sunnhordland. The main motive of the seal is a coat of arms with a crown over two crossed axes, almost identical to the current coat of arms. The axe was the holy symbol of saint Olav as he was martyred with an axe. There are two of them to represent Olsok, 29 July and the lesser feast day of Saint Olav, 3 August. The crown is the Crown of Saint Olav, King of Norway. In the seal the coat of arms was surrounded by the inscription "S'CONVIVARVM: BETI: OLAVI: DE: HONAREI"; The seal of the Guild of Saint Olav on Onarheim.
