= Coat of arms of Vestfold =

Heraldic coat of arms for Vestfold

2024–onwards

The coat of arms of Vestfold alludes to the tradition of the ancient Norwegian Royal house of Yngling originated in Vestfold. It is a golden medieval cloverleaf crown on red background. It was created by Hallvard Trettebærg and approved on 30. January 1970.

The current coat of arms is a redesigned version of the coat of arms for Vestfold from 1970 until the merger with Telemark in 2020.

1970 – 2020

== Literature ==
- Hans Cappelen and Knut Johannessen: Norske kommunevåpen, Oslo 1987
