= Norwegian Cyber Defence Force =

Branch of the Norwegian Armed Forces

- Cyberforsvaret
- Badge of Cyberforsvaret
- Founded: September 18, 2012; 14 years ago
- Country: Norway
- Type: Cyber force
- Size: 1,200 (2017)
- Part of: Norwegian Armed Forces
- Garrison/HQ: Jørstadmoen Leir

Commanders
- Commander-in-Chief: Haakon VIII
- Ceremonial chief: Generalmajor Halvor Johansen

The Norwegian Cyber Defence Force (Norwegian: Cyberforsvaret) is a branch of the Norwegian Armed Forces responsible for military communications and defensive cyberwarfare in Norway. The force employs 1,500 people located at more than 60 locations. The main base is at Jørstadmoen in Fåberg with a secondary base at Kolsås outside Oslo.

When founded in 2012, Norway was among the first countries in the world to place its cyber defence force on an equal footing with the traditional branches of the armed forces (army, navy, air force), having status as a separate entity with the status of a military branch.

== History ==
The Cyber Defence was established as its own branch on 18 September 2012, which was originally known as the Norwegian Defence Information Infrastructure (Forsvarets informasjonsinfrastruktur).

== Commanders ==
- 2012–2013: Roar Sundseth
- 2013–2016: Odd Egil Pedersen
- 2016–2017: Kurt Pedersen (acting)
- 2017–2022: Inge Kampenes
- 2022–: Halvor Johansen
