= Alta-class minesweeper =

Norwegian class of minesweepers

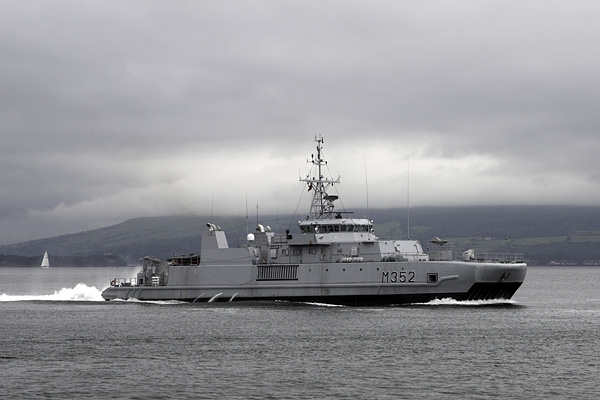
- Norwegian Alta-class minesweeper Rauma (M352)

Class overview
- Name: Alta class
- Builders: Kværner Mandal, Mandal, Norway
- Operators: Royal Norwegian Navy
- In commission: 1996–present
- Completed: 5
- Active: 3
- Lost: 1
- Retired: 1

General characteristics
- Type: Minesweeper
- Displacement: 375 tonnes
- Length: 55.2 metres
- Beam: 13.6 metres
- Height: 21 metres
- Draught: 2.5 metres
- Propulsion: 2 × 2.7 MW (3,621 hp) MTU 12V 396 TE84 diesel engines; 2 × Kværner water jets
- Speed: 30 knots (56 km/h; 35 mph)
- Range: 1,500 mi (2,400 km)
- Complement: 32
- Sensors & processing systems: Oropesa mechanical sweep; Kongsberg Defence & Aerospace (KDA) Agate (Air Gun and Transducer Equipment) acoustic minesweeping system; Elma magnetic sweepers
- Armament: 1 × Sadral surface-to-air missile system; 1 or 2 × Rheinmetall 20 mm AA guns; 2 × 12.7 mm machine guns

The Alta class is a ship class of minesweepers operated by the Royal Norwegian Navy. An almost identical class of minehunters is known as the Oksøy class.

== Design ==
The Alta class was built by Kværner Mandal during 1996 and 1997, while the related Oksøy class was built in 1994 and 1995. A total of nine vessels were built, five minesweepers and four minehunters. The catamaran hull is built in a fibre-reinforced plastic sandwich of very low magnetic signature.

Two large fans located on each side create an air cushion between the two hulls and a front and aft rubber skirt, lifting the vessel, giving small drag and a high cruise speed, as well as low susceptibility to the shock of exploding mines since only a small portion of the hull is actually exposed in the water. Propulsion by water jet, again one in each hull, gives a low acoustic signature. A degaussing system gives the vessels extremely low electromagnetic signature.

== Ships ==
Builder	Number	Name	Commissioned	Status	Image
Kværner, Mandal	M350	Alta	12 January 1996	Scrapped some time prior to 23 July 2022	
Kværner, Mandal	M351	Otra	8 November 1996		
Kværner, Mandal	M352	Rauma	2 December 1996		
Kværner, Mandal	M353	Orkla		Destroyed by fire on 19 November 2002	
Kværner, Mandal	M354	Glomma	1 July 1997	Sold 2009	

== Service history ==
Orkla was destroyed by fire on 19 November 2002. Glomma is no longer in active service. Alta was scrapped along with the Oksøy class M341 Karmøy prior to 23 July 2022
