= Oksøy-class mine hunter =

Norwegian navy ship class

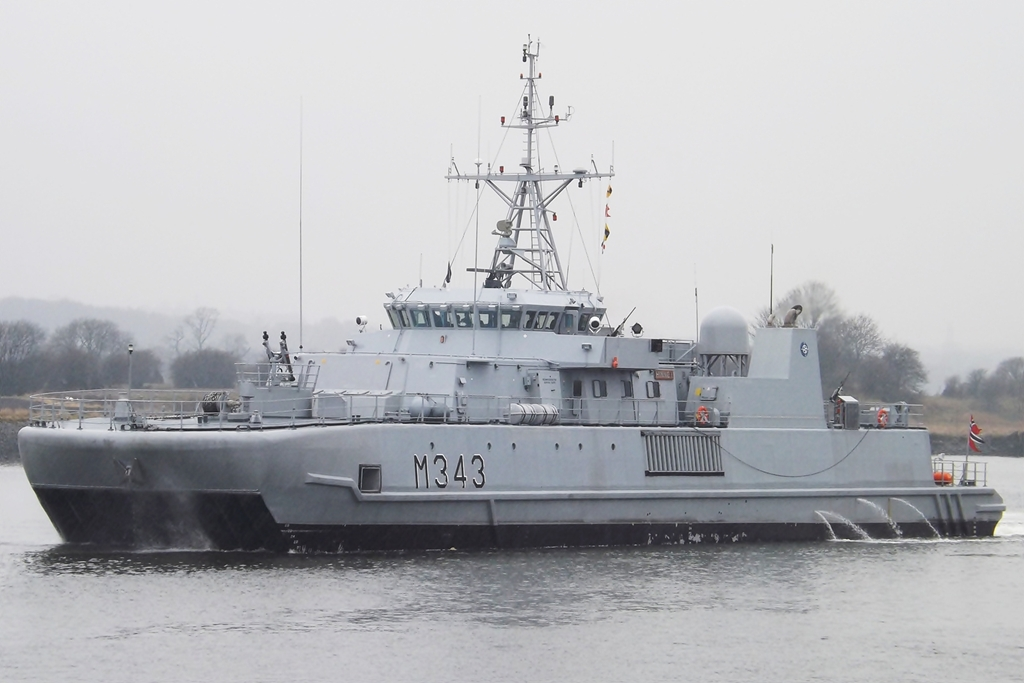
- Hinnøy in 2013.

Class overview
- Name: Oksøy class
- Builders: Kvaerner Mandal, Mandal, Norway
- Operators: Royal Norwegian Navy
- In commission: 1995–present
- Completed: 4
- Active: 3
- Retired: 1

General characteristics
- Type: Minesweeper
- Displacement: 375 tonnes
- Length: 55.2 metres
- Beam: 13.6 metres
- Height: 21 metres
- Draught: 2.5 metres
- Propulsion: 2 × 2.7 MW (3,621 hp) MTU 12V 396 TE84 diesel engines; 2 × Kvaerner water jets
- Speed: Over 20 knots (37 km/h; 23 mph)
- Range: 1,500 mi (2,400 km)
- Complement: 32
- Sensors & processing systems: Oropesa mechanical sweep; Kongsberg Defence & Aerospace (KDA) Agate (Air Gun and Transducer Equipment) acoustic minesweeping system; Elma magnetic sweepers
- Armament: 1 × Sadral surface-to-air missile system; 1 or 2 × Rheinmetall 20 mm AA guns; 2 × 12.7 mm machine guns

The Oksøy-class mine hunters are a class of vessels of the Royal Norwegian Navy active since the mid-1990s.

Almost identical to the Alta class, the only differences are the equipment on the aft deck and aft 1. deck, the sonars (two instead of one), and the length of the superstructure on 1. deck. The minehunters carry two ROV's, and when in active service a few highly trained divers, with competence in mine clearing. While the minesweepers have only one rigid inflatable boat, the Oksøy-class carries two, one for the divers and one for other purposes.

== Ships ==
Oksøy class
Number	Name	Builder	Commissioned	Status
M340	Oksøy	Kvaerner, Mandal	24 March 1994	Ran aground in Hjeltefjorden in 2005; sold in 2009.
M341	Karmøy	Kvaerner, Mandal	24 October 1994	Scrapped alongside M350 Alta some time prior to 23 July 2022
M342	Måløy	Kvaerner, Mandal	24 March 1995	
M343	Hinnøy	Kvaerner, Mandal	8 September 1995	

== Service history ==
HNoMS Oksøy was damaged when it ran aground in 2005.

== See also ==
- Alta-class minesweeper
