= Norwegian Home Guard =

Rapid mobilisation force in the Norwegian military

- Heimevernet
- Emblem
- Founded: December 6, 1946; 79 years ago
- Country: Norway
- Allegiance: King of Norway
- Type: Light infantry
- Size: 40,500
- Part of: Norwegian Armed Forces
- Headquarters: Terningmoen
- Mottos: Overalt – alltid (Everywhere – always)

Commanders
- Chief of Defence: General Eirik Kristoffersen
- Chief of the Home Guard: Major General Frode Ommundsen

Insignia
- Flag

- Standard

The Norwegian Home Guard (Norwegian: Heimevernet – "HV") is the rapid mobilization force within the Norwegian armed forces. Its main focus is local defense and civil support, but it can also detach volunteers for international operations. Its main tasks are safeguarding territorial integrity, strengthening military presence, and protecting important infrastructure.

Founded on 6 December 1946, this second-youngest branch of the Norwegian Armed Forces after the Norwegian Cyber Defence Force (Cyberforsvaret) and was established following the 1940 German occupation of Norway to address the need for a rapidly deployable territorial force. It formally incorporated the decentralised structure of the wartime resistance movement, Milorg, to establish a permanent nationwide defence network.

== Strength ==
The Home Guard has 40,500 soldiers all over the country, distributed on eleven regional districts. The Home Guard also has several rapid-reaction intervention forces consisting of 3,000 voluntarily recruited and well-trained soldiers.

== Organization ==
The Home Guard is divided into 12 districts ("HV-districts"), typically covering one or two counties, which again is divided into smaller units. In a wartime situation Heimevernet will typically be used to protect the local infrastructure and population.

The Home Guard district commanders represent a level of command subordinate to the Joint Operational Headquarters but with territorial responsibility which includes responsibility for operational planning. They also have a responsibility to the Chief of Staff of the Norwegian Home Guard for force production.

The Home Guard’s relies on deep-rooted connections with the civil community. At the local and county levels, regional commanders are directly responsible for cultivating strategic partnerships with law enforcement and municipal authorities. Through these established civil-military cooperation (CIMIC) channels, the Home Guard can provide critical support across a number of civilian-led activities such as disaster response and search and rescue operations.

Home Guard personnel normally undertake annual training. Ordinary soldiers may be called up for up to six days of annual Home Guard service, while specialists, NCOs and officers may serve for up to nine days. Personnel assigned to the Home Guard's rapid-reaction forces ("innsatsstyrker") undertake more extensive annual training.

Headquarters of Norwegian Home Guard districts

Region 1

- Oslofjord Heimevernsdistrikt 01 – HV-01 – Rygge. Responsible for territorial defence of Østfold and Vestfold.
- Oslo og Akershus Heimevernsdistrikt 02 – HV-02 – Lutvann. Responsible for territorial defence of Oslo and Akershus.
- Telemark og Buskerud Heimevernsdistrikt 03 – HV-03 – Heistadmoen. Responsible for territorial defence of Telemark and Buskerud.
- Opplandske Heimevernsdistrikt 05 – HV-05 – Terningmoen. Responsible for territorial defence of Innlandet.

Region 2

- Agder Heimevernsdistrikt 07 – HV-07 – Kjevik. Responsible for territorial defence of Agder.
- Rogaland Heimevernsdistrikt 08 – HV-08 – Vatneleiren. Responsible for territorial defence of Rogaland.
- Bergenhus Heimevernsdistrikt 09 – HV-09 – Bergenhus. Responsible for territorial defence of most of Vestland.

Region 3

- Møre og Romsdal Heimevernsdistrikt 11 – HV-11 – Setnesmoen. Responsible for territorial defence of Møre og Romsdal and northern parts of Vestland.
- Trøndelag Heimevernsdistrikt 12 – HV-12 – Værnes. Responsible for territorial defence of Trøndelag.
- Sør-Hålogaland Heimevernsdistrikt 14 – HV-14 – Drevjamoen. Responsible for territorial defence of most of Nordland.

Region 4

- Nord-Hålogaland Heimevernsdistrikt 16 – HV-16 – Elvegårdsmoen. Responsible for territorial defence of Troms and northern parts of Nordland.
- Finnmark Heimevernsdistrikt 17 – HV-17 – Porsangermoen. Responsible for territorial defence of Finnmark.

=== The Rapid Reaction Forces ===
From 2005, the Home Guard has recruited personnel for a high-readiness force with better-trained and better-equipped personnel. It is called the "Rapid Reaction Force" (Innsatsstyrke). This is the spearhead of the combat force and consists of specially selected, trained and equipped personnel. The force can be mobilized rapidly and is a national resource. The Rapid Reaction Forces contribute to national security.

Soldiers often come from operational units within the Armed Forces and commit themselves to a minimum of 3 years of service. They can be ordered to undertake operational missions in Norway. They must continuously maintain and further develop their military competence. They can attend a number of courses, task force missions and other defence activities.

There is one Rapid Reaction Force per district, with a total of 3,000 men and women. The Rapid Reaction Force is the spearhead of the Norwegian Home Guard and consists of flexible and mobile units. It has the highest priority for weapons, equipment and training resources. The force is ready to respond within hours to acts of terrorism, bomb threats and other emergencies. In peacetime, the RRFs can support the police and civilian authorities with a variety of tasks, including providing security for the public and supporting the enforcement of police regulations.

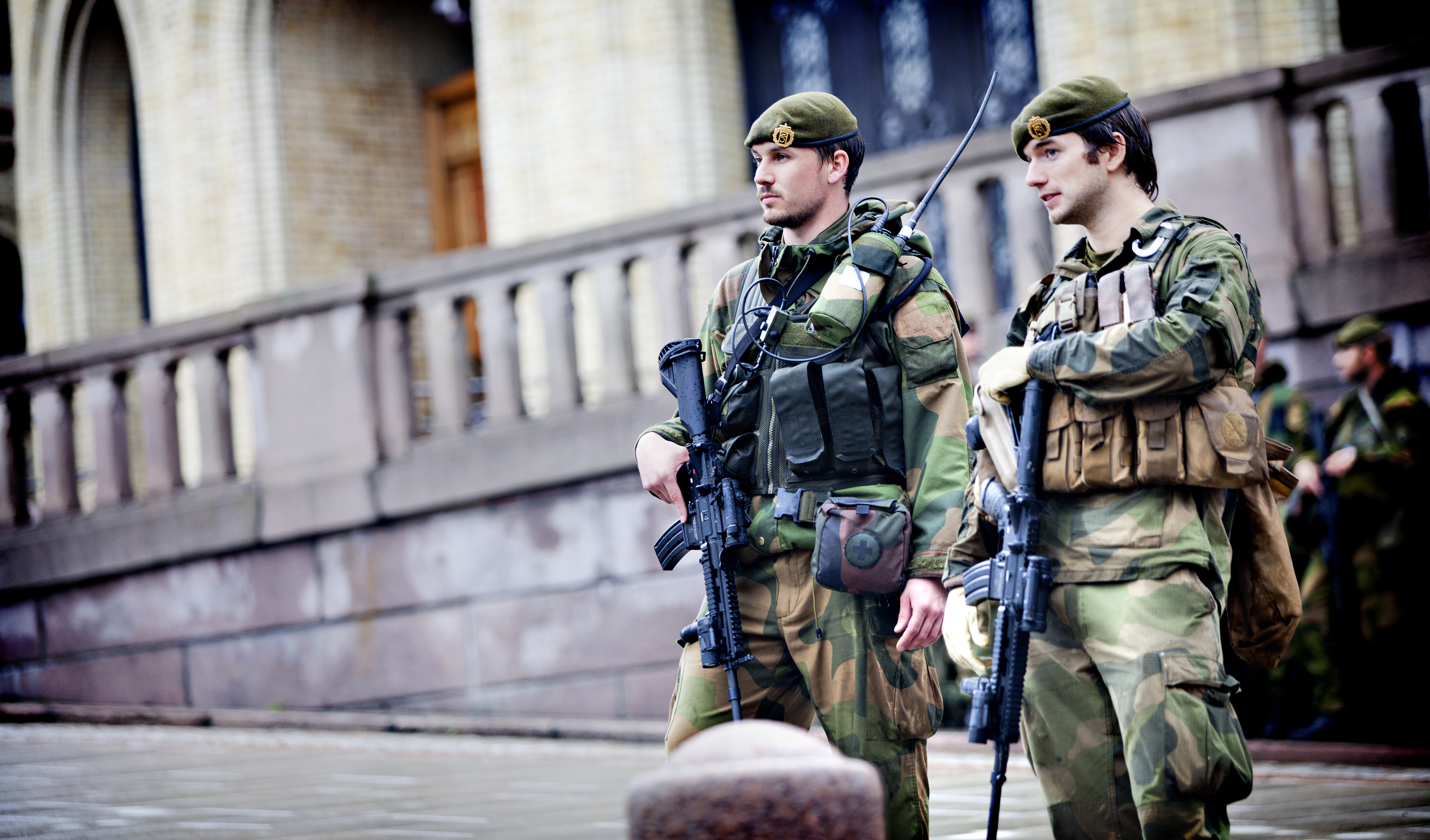
Home Guard soldiers guard the Storting after the 22 July 2011 terrorist attack

The RRFs are named after operations carried out during World War II by the Norwegian Independent Company 1 (a.k.a. Linge Company):

- Oslofjord HV-district 01: RRF Polar Bear VI
- Oslo and Akershus HV-district 02: RRF Derby
- Telemark and Buskerud HV-district 03: RRF Gunnerside
- Opplandske HV-district 05: RRF Grebe
- Agder and Rogaland HV-district 08: RRF Osprey and Varg
- Bergenhus HV-district 09: RRF Bjørn West
- Møre and Fjordane HV-district 11: RRF Archery
- Trøndelag HV-district 12: RRF Rype
- Sør-Hålogaland HV-district 14: RRF Heron
- Nord-Hålogaland HV-district 16: RRF Claymore
- Finnmark HV-district 17: RRF Ida & Lyra and Delfin

The Naval branch of the Home Guard used to be four RRFs, but the Norwegian government closed the units down in 2017 due to saving costs.

- South: RRF Bundle
- West: RRF Salamander
- North: RRFs Waxwing and Anklet

==== Platoons ====
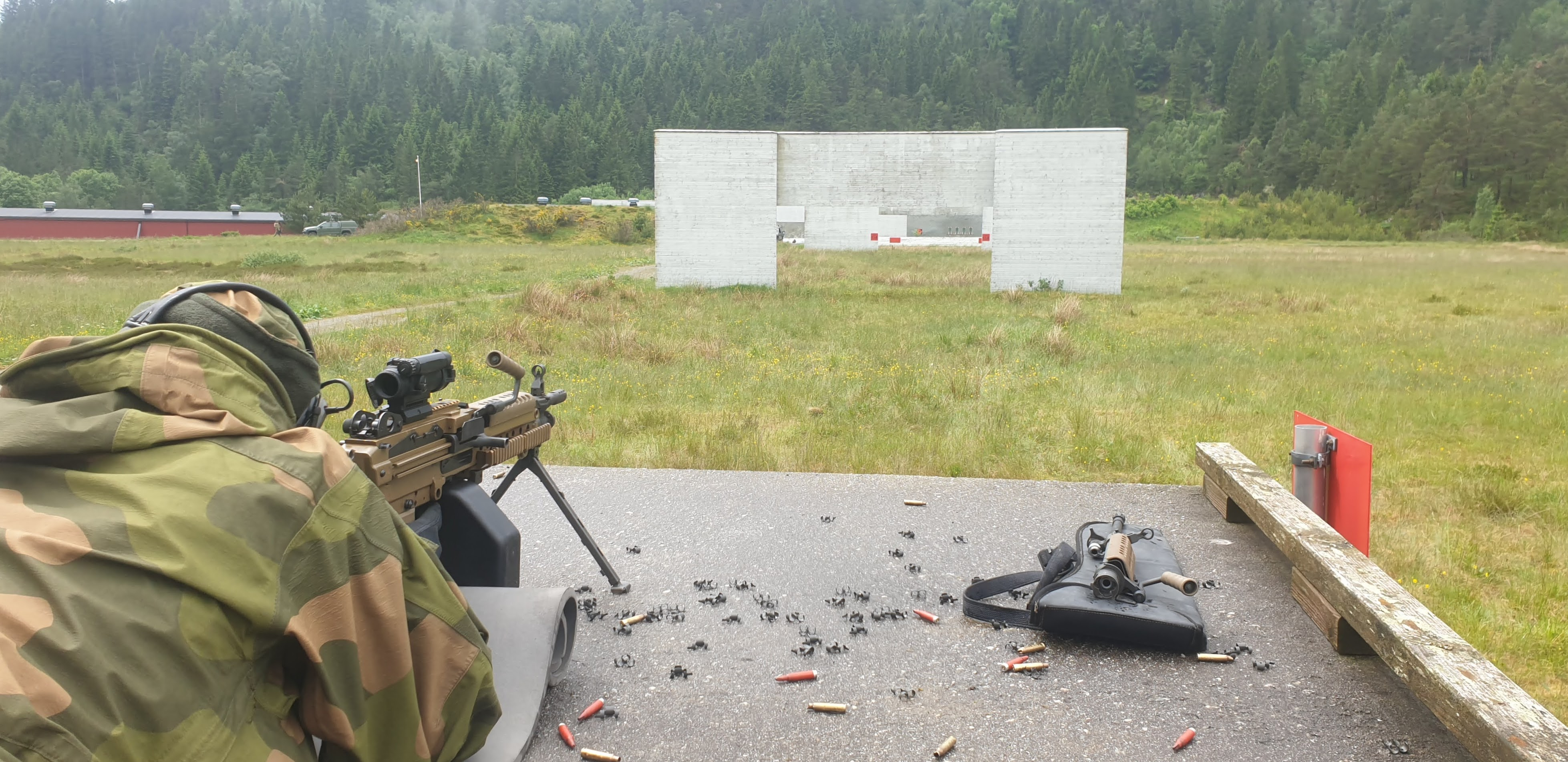
A Home Guard soldier trains at Ulven camp with the FN Minimi light machine gun in 2021,

The Rapid Reaction Forces consists of several different platoons within each district. In this way, each district will be able to respond to any kind of incident that could occur, without having to rely on outside help. Each district (with some variations) will have trained operators in these different types of units:

- Jegertropp (Ranger platoon)
- Skarpskyttertropp (Sniper platoon)
- MP-tjeneste (Military Police)
- Hundetjenesten (K9 unit)
- Stabstropp (Staff platoon – (S-1, to S-4), transport & logistics)
- Sambandstropp (Signal platoon)
- Dykkerlag (Diving team – Underwater reconnaissance, explosives-detection)
- Sanitetstropp (Medical platoon)
- Innsatstropper (Infantry platoons)

A Light Mechanized unit has been established in district's 12, 14 and 16. this one is called Multi-Troppen (Multi Platoon). These platoons handle the custom made Geländewagen 290 multi III and is the speartip of the RRF's.

In Oslo, one of the Home Guard units is styled as a cavalry squadron, and wears black cavalry berets, because it used to be equipped with M24 Chaffee light tanks and M3 White armored cars, and was manned by former army dragoons. Its main mission was the defense of the former Fornebu airport; this mission was changed to escort duties, and it is now one of the rapid response units in Oslo.

== Equipment ==
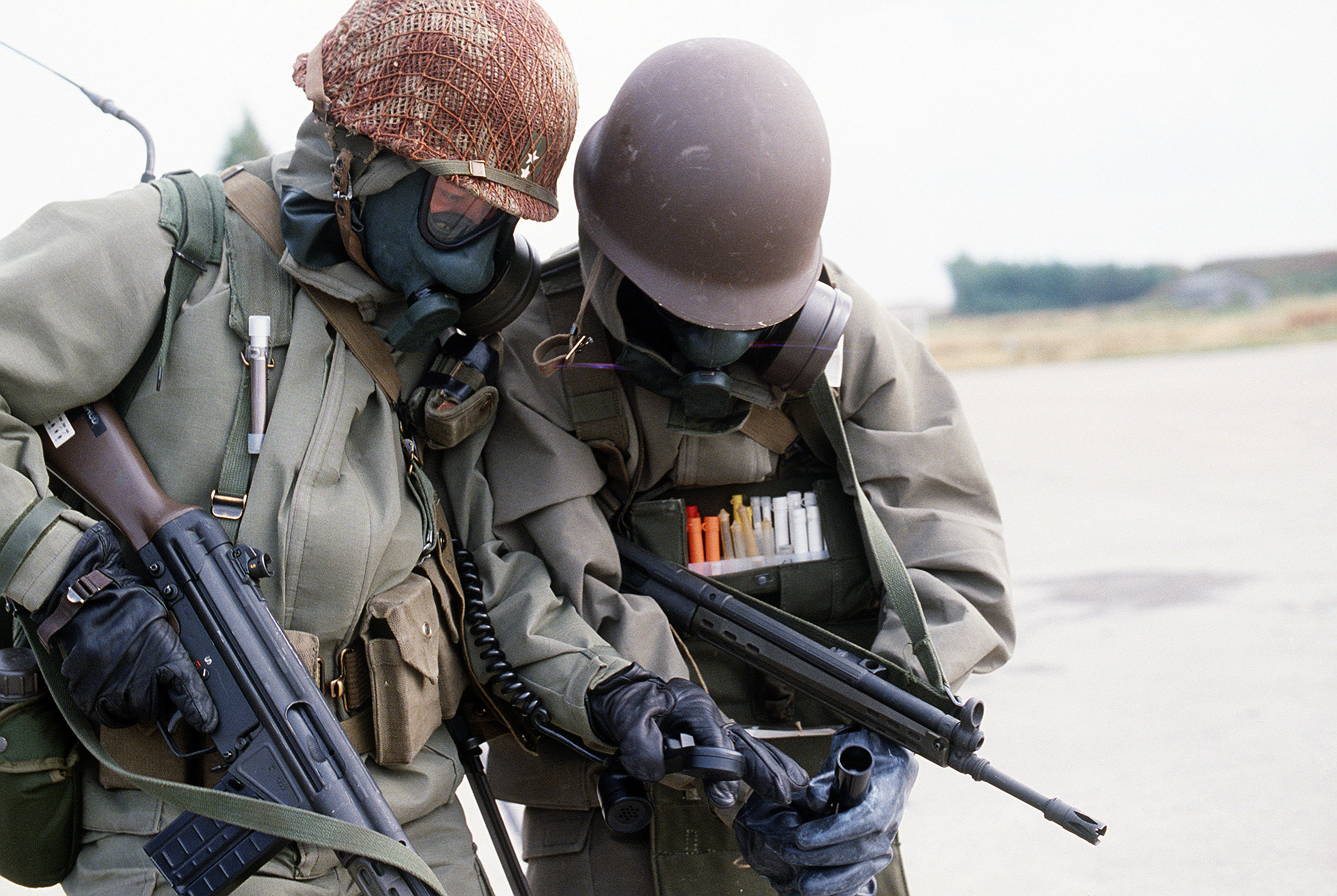
Norwegian Home Guardsman with AG-3 in 1983

Until the end of the 1960s, the Home Guard used second-hand weapons from the Norwegian Army. At the end of the period, the Home Guard was equipped with more modern and heavier weapons.

The Home Guard today uses small arms like the MP-7 submachine guns, HK416 automatic rifles, MG-3 machine gun and FN Minimi light machine guns. Additionally, the Barrett M82 sniper rifle and Glock 17 pistol are used. Additionally, the Carl Gustaf 8.4cm recoilless rifle is used by the rapid reaction forces infantry platoons.

The vehicle fleet consists mainly of Mercedes-Benz G-Class utility vehicles, ambulances, BV 206 and Scania lorries. In November 2020, The Rapid Reaction Forces received 420 new Volkswagen Amarok field wagons, to replace the older MB 240 wagons.

== Weapons school ==
The Home Guards weapon school Heimevernets våpenskole (HVVS) established in 1947 is located at Dombås. The training centre is providing education and courses for Home Guard personnel, but also for the other branches in the armed forces.

HVVS schools 1200 NCOs and officers yearly, and offers 70 different courses of various length.

== Traditions ==
Standard of the Oslofjord Home Guard district incorporating the colors of the Østfold Infantry Regiment

=== Troop exchange ===
The Home Guard does a troop exchange with the Minnesota National Guard every year. The exchange grew from Norwegian American soldiers sent to Norway to assist resistance fighters in World War II. As part of the exchange, American Guard members are flown to Værnes Air Station and Norwegians are sent to Camp Ripley. Troops complete each other's training, and tour the area.

=== Standards ===
The Home Guard districts received their first standards in 1991. These were solid green with a gold Norwegian lion in the centre and the district's emblem in each corner. This was unlike the standards used by their counterparts in the Army, the Territorial Regiments, which were made up of several different colours and also bore the names of the wars in which the regiments had participated. Following the disbandment of the territorial regiments in 2002, the Home Guard continued their traditions and incorporated many of their personnel. It was therefore only natural that the colours on the territorial regiments' standards were passed on to the Home Guard districts when the current standards were created. These were handed over by King Harald in a 2002 ceremony celebrating the Home Guard's 60th anniversary.

== See also ==
- Directives for Military Officers and Ministry Officials upon an Attack of Norway
- Home Guard
