= NoCGV Barentshav =

Norwegian Coast Guard vessel

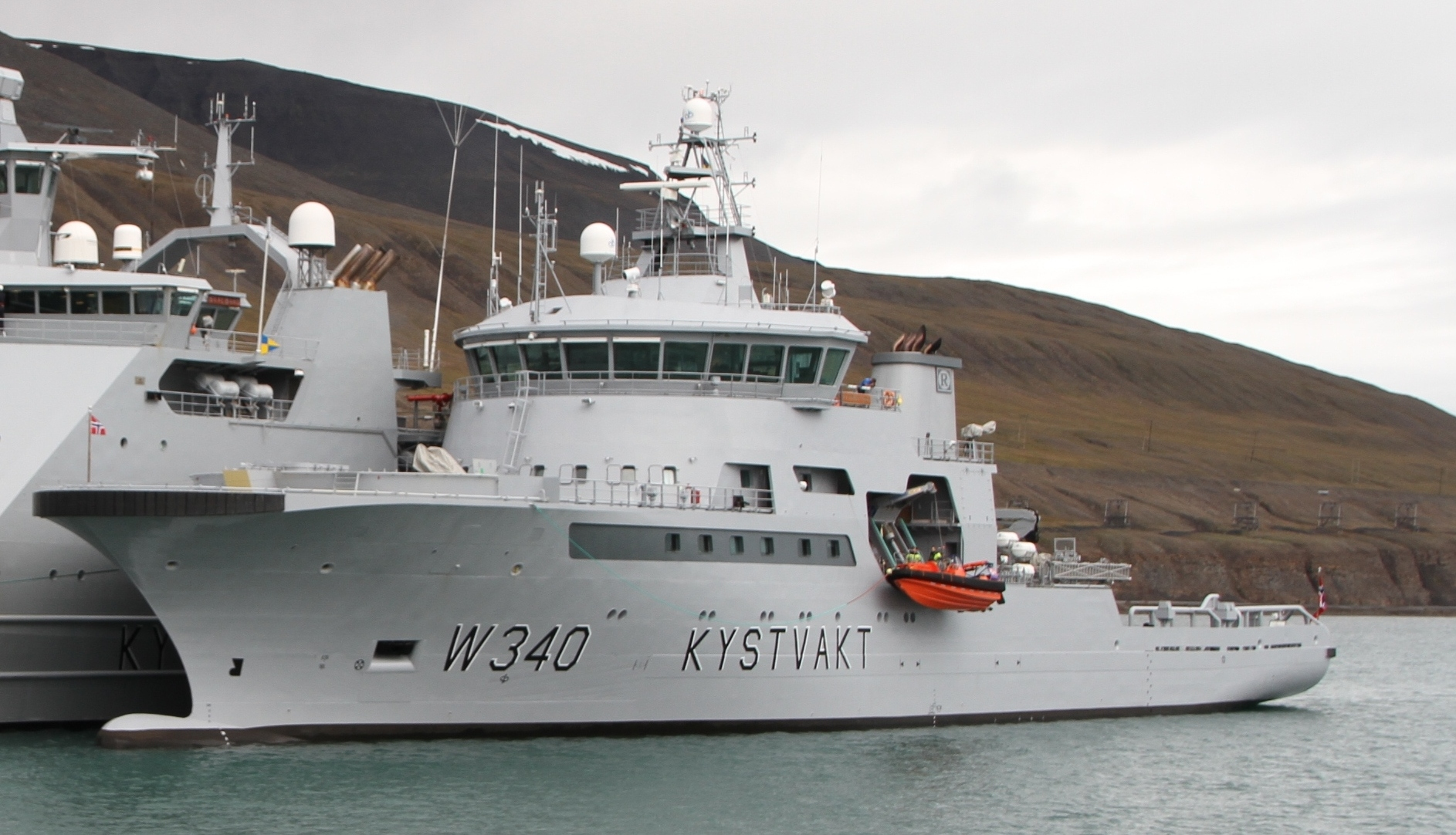
- NoCGV Barentshav

History

Norway
- Name: NoCGV Barentshav
- Namesake: Barents Sea
- Ordered: 21 October 2005
- Builder: Myklebust Verft, Norway
- Launched: 6 August 2008
- Acquired: August 2009
- Identification: IMO number: 9389356; MMSI number: 259317000; Callsign: LAQL
- Status: Active

General characteristics
- Class & type: Barentshav-class offshore patrol vessel
- Displacement: 3,200 long tons (3,251 t)
- Length: 93 m (305 ft)
- Beam: 16.6 m (54 ft)
- Draught: 5.8 m (19 ft)
- Propulsion: Hybrid diesel-LNG engines
- Speed: 20 knots (37 km/h; 23 mph)
- Complement: 16
- Armament: 1 × Bofors 40 mm gun
- Notes: Bollard pull: 110 tons

NoCGV Barentshav is a large offshore patrol vessel of the Norwegian Coast Guard, and is their first liquefied natural gas-powered vessel. The contract was signed 21 October 2005, and NoCGV Barentshav was delivered in August 2009.

== Operational history ==
On 11 and 12 September 2023, Barentshav was following the Russian intelligence vessel Yantar in the Fram Strait. At 12:35 on Monday, the Russian ship started closely following Kronprins Haakon, and would continue to do so for 16.5 hours. The Russian ship was operating without AIS and would overtly copy all of the research vessel's stops and movements, at one point closing to a distance of 200–370 metres (660–1,210 ft). While the Norwegian Polar Institute characterised the incident as "harassment", and the Royal Norwegian Navy reportedly keeps a close eye on the Russian intelligence vessel, all relevant Norwegian authorities assessed that Yantar did not violate international maritime law. Yantar left the research vessel at 05:05 the next day, and Barentshav continued following the Russian spy ship.

== See also ==
- Barentshav-class offshore patrol vessel
- NoCGV Harstad
