= Jan Mayen-class patrol vessel =

Class of Norwegian Coast Guard ship

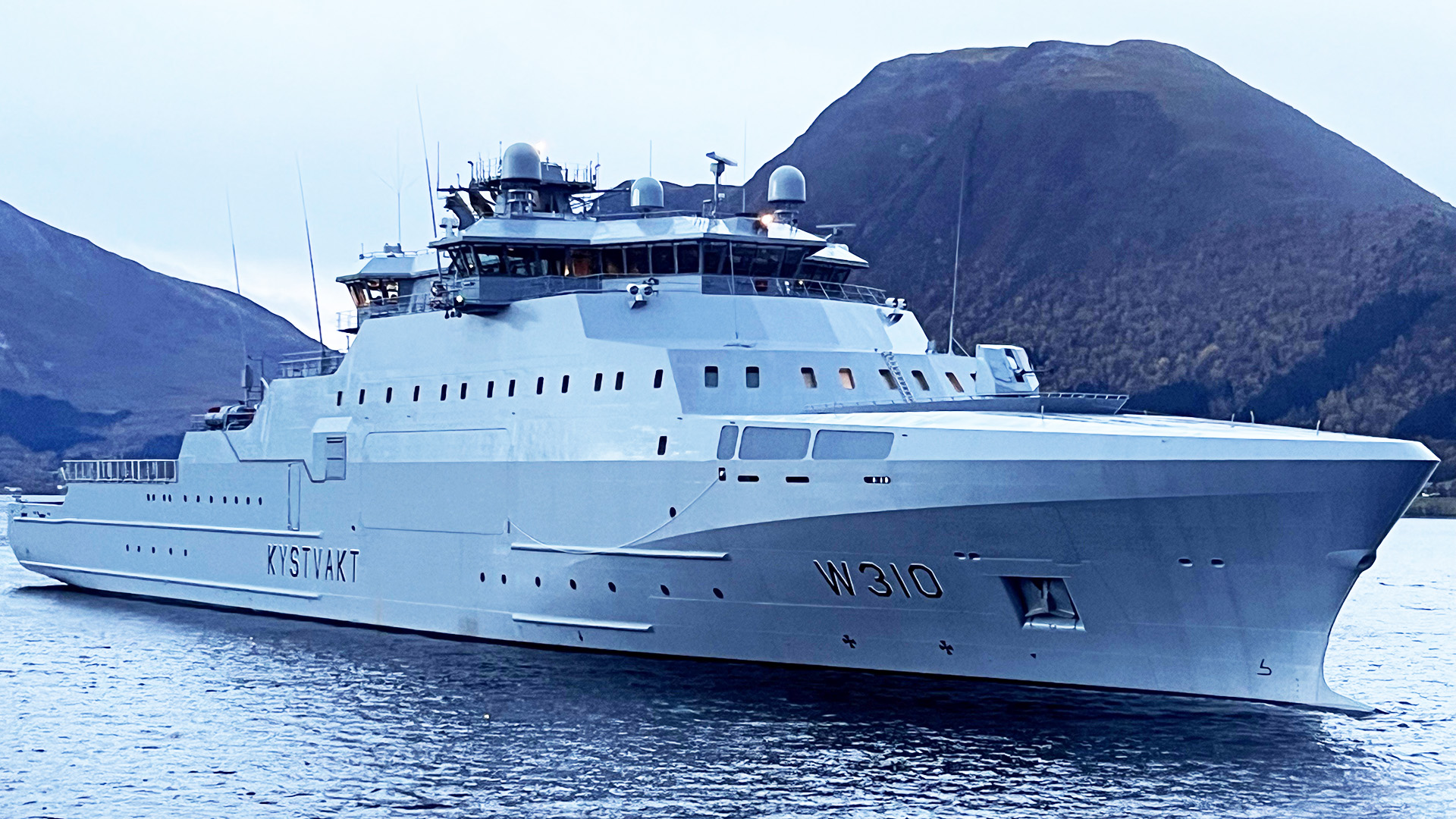
- NoCGV Jan Mayen

Class overview
- Name: Jan Mayen class
- Operators: Norwegian Coast Guard/Royal Norwegian Navy
- Preceded by: Nordkapp class
- Cost: 5-billion kroner (for 3 vessels)
- Completed: 3
- Active: 3

General characteristics
- Type: Offshore patrol vessel
- Displacement: 9,800 tons (standard)
- Length: 136.4 m (447 ft 6 in)
- Beam: 22 m (72 ft 2 in)
- Draught: 6.2 m (20 ft 4 in)
- Propulsion: 2 × MTU 20V 8000 M91L Diesels 10000Kw (27200 HP in total)
- Speed: 22–23 knots (41–43 km/h; 25–26 mph)
- Complement: max. 100
- Sensors & processing systems: TRS-3D/32 radar; CEROS 200 Tracker [9LV Mk3 Basic] radar; SS1221 sonar; EOS 500 visual and infrared camera with laser rangefinder
- Armament: 1 × Bofors 57 mm L/70 gun; .50 calibre machine guns
- Aircraft carried: 1 × Sikorsky SH-60 (planned)
- Aviation facilities: Hangar for two helicopters

The Jan Mayen class is a class of offshore patrol vessels used by the Norwegian Coast Guard. The Coast Guard first announced plans for the class in September 2016, to increase their capability to patrol Norway's expansive coastal waters, and to replace the ageing Nordkapp-class vessels.

Considerably larger than their predecessors, the hulls of these ships were constructed at the Vard Tulcea shipyard in Romania. The hulls were then towed to Norway where the ships were outfitted and tested at the Vard Langsten shipyard.

The total cost for the 3 ships in the class is expected to be 7.2 billion kroner ($645 million), one of the largest maritime defense expenditures ever made by Norway.

== Design ==
The design of the ships was contracted to LMG Marin, a Norwegian engineering services company.

The hull of the Jan-Mayen-class is designed to be ice-strengthened, to enable independent navigation of icy seas. The deck is large enough at stern to accommodate an AW101 helicopter, and it includes a hangar that can house a further two NH90s.

These ships are armed with a single Bofors 57 mm L/70 gun for use against surface and airborne targets, as well as .50 calibre machine guns for use against soft surface targets. They will utilize the 9LV Combat Management System for fire control.

For navigation, Jan-Mayen-class ships will utilize a Marins-series inertial navigation system, along with a Quadrans gyrocompass and a Netans navigation data distribution and computation system. Communication onboard the ship, along with external communications, will be handled by the TactiCall Integrated Communication System, from Saab AB.

The ships are designed for a crew of 100, and will be able to support operations longer than 60 days.

== Ships in class ==
The ships are named after the Norwegian arctic islands of Jan Mayen, Bjørnøya and Hopen.

Pennant number	Name	Ordered	Laid down	Launched	Commissioned	Status
W310	Jan Mayen	25 June 2018	April 2020	August 2021	Early 2023	Active
W311	Bjørnøya	25 June 2018	April 2020		November 2023	Active
W312	Hopen	25 June 2018			September 2024	Active
