= Barentshav-class patrol vessel =

Ship class

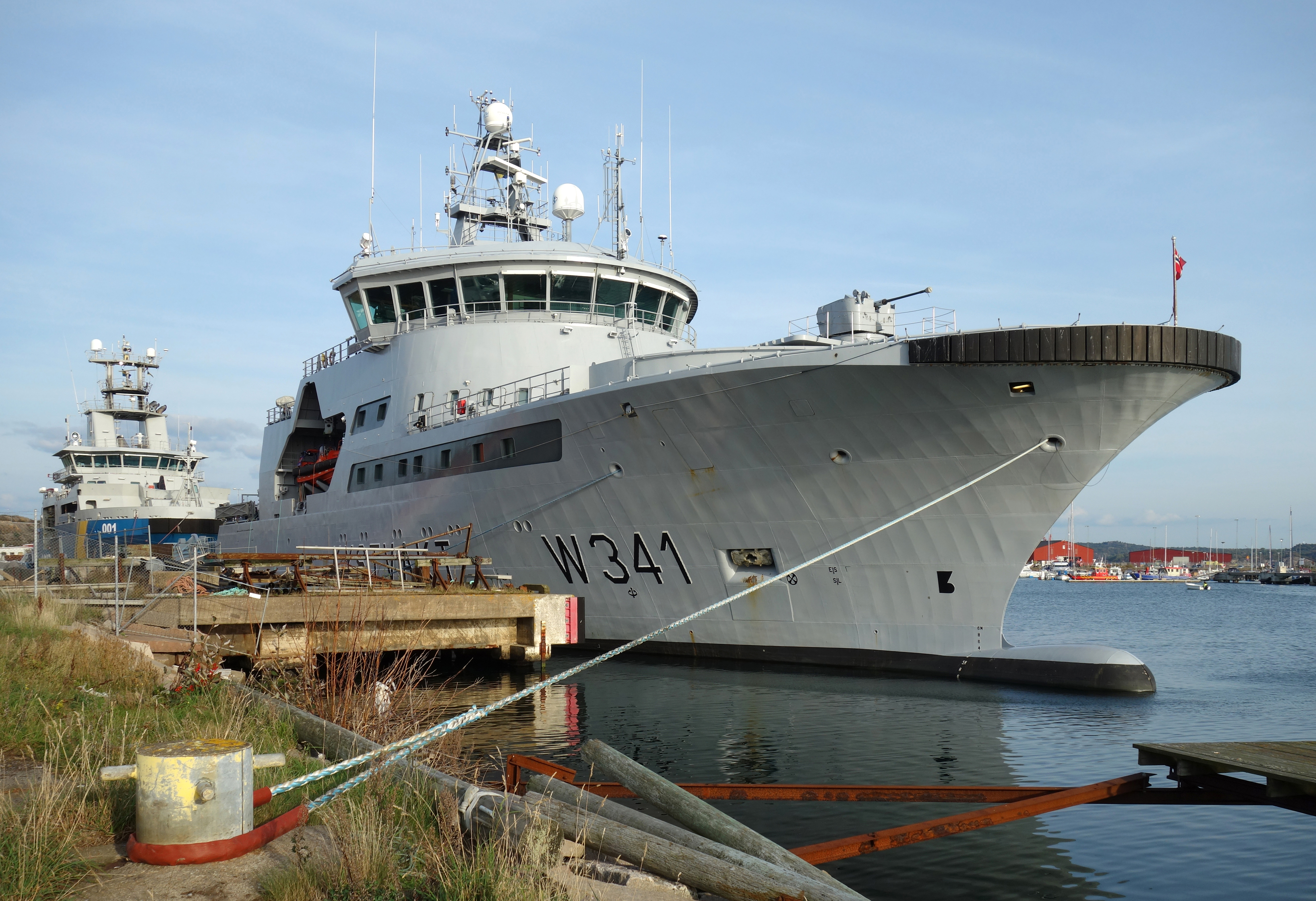
- NoCGV Bergen visiting in Lysekil, Sweden

Class overview
- Name: Barentshav class
- Builders: Myklebust Verft
- Operators: Royal Norwegian Navy
- In commission: 2009-
- Planned: 3
- Active: 3

General characteristics
- Type: Offshore patrol vessel
- Displacement: 3,200 long tons (3,251 t)
- Length: 303 ft (92 m)
- Beam: 54 ft (16 m)
- Draught: 20 ft (6.1 m)
- Propulsion: Bergen Diesel B32 engine; →4000 kilowatts; Gas generator sets 3 × Mitsubishi GS16R-MPTK, 1 × GS12R-MPTK; →3237 kilowatts; Auxiliary engine Mitsubishi S6A3-MPTA; →350 kilowatts
- Speed: 16.5 knots (19.0 mph; 30.6 km/h) (gas); 18.5 knots (21.3 mph; 34.3 km/h) (diesel); Over 20 knots (23 mph; 37 km/h) (combined gas/diesel)
- Complement: 8 officers (combination of civilian and military) and 8 conscripts, designed for a crew of 40
- Armament: Bofors 40 mm gun
- Notes: Bollard pull: 110 tons; Deck equipment: Rolls-Royce towing winch, 250 ton breaking capacity; Deck crane, SWL 8 tons at 6.3 m extension

The Barentshav class of offshore patrol vessels consists of three vessels powered by liquefied natural gas. Ordered for the Norwegian Coast Guard, their main tasks are EEZ patrol, fishery inspection, search and rescue as well as tug readiness along the shore of Norway which is seeing increasing traffic from tankers.

== Design ==
The vessels are of the Vik-Sandvik design VS 794 CGV, and were built by Myklebust Verft and operated by Remøy Management on behalf of the Norwegian Coast Guard.

The Coast Guard expects a 90% decrease in NO_{x} fume releases, and a 20% decrease in CO_{2} releases compared to a conventionally powered vessel of similar size.

The ships replace NoCGV Chieftain, Tromsø and Stålbas. Stålbas' lease contract expired at the end of 2006, Tromsø's on 20 March 2007, and Chieftain's at the end of 2007. NoCGV Barentshav was delivered in August 2009, Bergen in late 2009/early 2010 and Sortland in 2010.

The Barentshav class is equipped for the NATO Submarine Rescue System.

== Vessels ==
Barentshav class
#	Name	Laid down	Launched	Commissioned	Status
W340	Barentshav			August 2009	
W341	Bergen			10 April 2010	
W342	Sortland			14 July 2010	

== See also ==
- NoCGV Harstad
