= NoCGV Ålesund =

Ship built in 1996

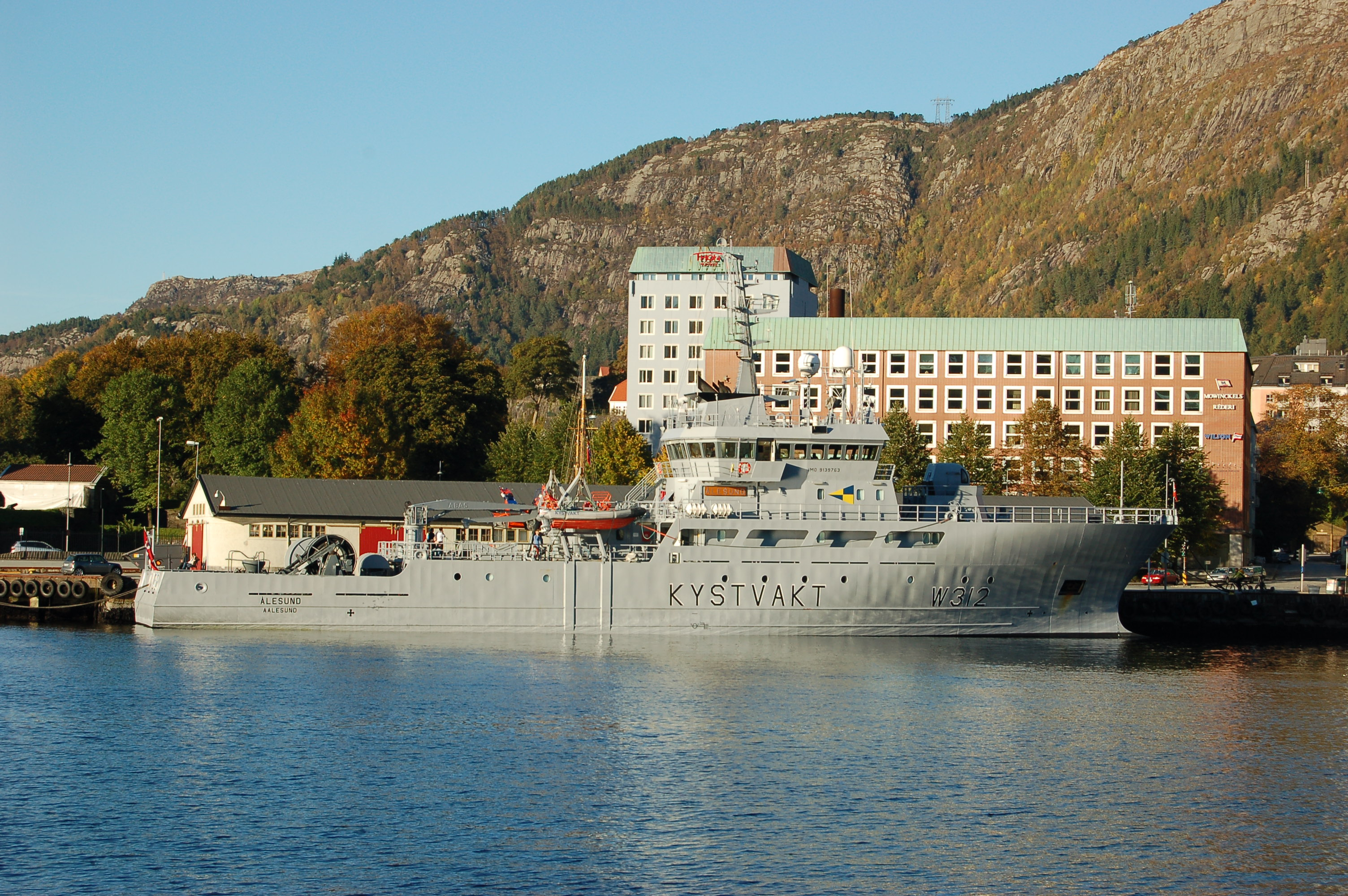
- NoCGV Ålesund in Bergen

History

Norway
- Name: NoCGV Ålesund
- Namesake: Ålesund
- Builder: Myklebust Mekaniske Verksted, Gurskebotn
- Commissioned: 1996
- Identification: IMO number: 9139763; MMSI number: 259337000; Call sign: W312 and LHXC
- Status: Out of service

General characteristics
- Type: Offshore patrol vessel
- Displacement: 1350 tons
- Length: 63.20 m (207 ft 4 in) oa; 57.00 m (187 ft 0 in) pp
- Beam: 11.50 m (37 ft 9 in)
- Draught: 4.67 m (15 ft 4 in)
- Installed power: Wärtsilä Wichmann 8V28B, 3,600 hp (2,700 kW)
- Speed: 18 knots (33 km/h; 21 mph)
- Complement: 23 (5 officers, 15 other ranks and 3 civilians)
- Armament: 40 mm/L70 Bofors cannon and 12,7 mm machine guns

NoCGV Ålesund was a purpose-built, leased, offshore patrol vessel for the Norwegian Coast Guard of the Royal Norwegian Navy.

In November 1995, the Norwegian Coast Guard ordered two purpose-built chartered Fishery Protection Vessels, the NoCGV Tromsø, a 2,100-ton Polish-built vessel chartered from Tromsø Dampskibsselskab, and Ålesund, a 1,350-ton vessel chartered from Remøy Shipping. Ålesund entered service in April 1996.

Ålesund is named after the city Ålesund in Western Norway. She is a 1,350-ton vessel, and was armed with a Bofors 40 mm gun and Colt 12,7mm heavy machine guns. Ålesund was used for general EEZ patrol, including fishery inspection and search and rescue. She was based at the naval base Haakonsvern in Bergen. Her crew contained 10 officers and 12 conscripts.

She is currently disarmed and laid up in Herøy by owners. No plans for future use is known.
