= NoCGV Svalbard =

Norwegian offshore patrol vessel

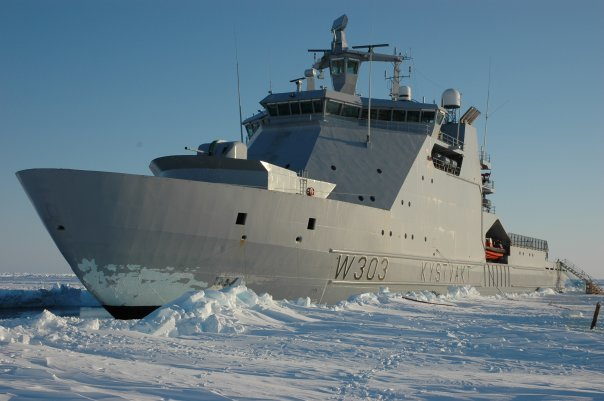

History

Norway
- Name: Svalbard
- Namesake: Svalbard
- Builder: Hull at Tangen Verft, Kragerø Outfitting at Langsten Tomrefjord
- Cost: NOK 575 million (Note: Radar and helicopter not included.); USD 66.9 million
- Laid down: 9 August 2000
- Launched: 17 February 2001
- Commissioned: 15 December 2001
- Identification: Callsign: LBSV; IMO number: 8640387; MMSI number: 259040000
- Status: In service

General characteristics
- Class & type: Offshore patrol vessel
- Displacement: 6,375 tonnes
- Length: 340.2 ft (103.7 m) (overall); 292 ft (89 m) (waterline)
- Beam: 62.6 ft (19.1 m)
- Draught: 21.3 ft (6.5 m)
- Depth: 27.2 ft (8.3 m)
- Installed power: Four Bergen BRG-8 diesel generators (4 × 3,390 kW)
- Propulsion: Diesel-electric; Two ABB Azipod VI1500A units (2 × 5 MW)
- Speed: 17.5 knots (32.4 km/h; 20.1 mph)
- Complement: 50 (20 officers and 45 other ranks split into 3 shifts with 2 shifts on board at any one time)
- Sensors & processing systems: TRS-3D with IFF
- Armament: 57 mm gun; 12.7 mm machine gun; Can carry 1 Simbad surface-to-air missile system
- Aircraft carried: Capacity for two helicopters; one Westland Lynx carried initially, NHIndustries NH90 from 2009

NoCGV Svalbard (W303) is a Norwegian Coast Guard icebreaker and offshore patrol vessel. The ship was constructed by Langsten at Tangen Verft shipyard in Kragerø and launched on 17 February 2001. She was named 15 December 2001 in Tomrefjord with Minister of Defence Kristin Krohn Devold as godmother, and delivered to the Coast Guard on 18 January 2002. She entered service in mid-2002 and is homeported in Sortland. Her primary operating area is in the Arctic waters north of Norway, the Barents Sea and around the Svalbard islands.

Svalbard is the second largest ship in Norway's military armed forces (by tonnage), designed to supplement the three other helicopter-carrying ships of the Norwegian Coast Guard - the Nordkapp-class offshore patrol vessels. She is NBC-protected with constant overpressure, and is capable of icebreaking and emergency towing up to 100,000 tons. The Norwegian coastline is generally free of ice, thus Svalbard is the one of just two Norwegian icebreaking-capable vessel, the other being Kronprins Haakon. A double acting ship, Svalbard is designed to break ice both ahead and astern.

== Career ==
On 21 August 2019, Svalbard became the first Norwegian ship to reach the North Pole.

In October 2020, Svalbard was deployed to the Bering Sea to retrieve scientific instruments belonging to the Coordinated Arctic Acoustic Thermometry Experiment (CAATEX) from the seabed, a task previously assigned to the United States Coast Guard icebreaker USCGC Healy that had been sidelined earlier that year following an onboard fire. The vessel sailed to the western hemisphere along a high-latitude route north of Svalbard and Franz Josef Land, and outside of Russian territorial waters. Despite the scientific mission, a number of Russian media outlets interpreted this voyage as an "intrusion" to the Russian Arctic by an "armed NATO warship".

In 2023, the ship carried out joint scientific and rescue exercises in the Arctic with the USCC Healy. The 2023 defence acquisition plan indicated that the ship would receive necessary upgrades to permit her to continue in service.

== Foreign analogs ==
On 9 July 2007 Canadian Prime Minister Stephen Harper announced that Canada would build six to eight Arctic offshore patrol ships (AOPS) for the Royal Canadian Navy (RCN), modeled after Svalbard's design. The vessels' design was modified to meet the needs of the RCN. Some of the modifications include: increasing the ships' ice breaking capabilities, adding a larger and fully enclosed forecastle/cable deck for greater arctic protection, addition of a multipurpose operational space, updated command and control systems, an updated sensor suite, and an extended hangar for the larger Sikorsky CH-148 Cyclone helicopter. The project was criticized for its high costs. For example, Irving Shipbuilding was awarded a CA$288 million design contract for the vessel while the design of Svalbard and similar patrol ships within other countries paid less than one-tenth as much. The first ship in its class, Harry DeWolf, was delivered to the RCN on 31 July 2020, with its commissioning anticipated in mid-2021 following the completion of post-acceptance sea trials.

In 2015 Russia started constructing the first of several vessels in its Project 23550. Think tank Global Security pointed out these vessels are almost the same length, displacement, power and endurance as the Svalbard class. They will also be able to travel through roughly the same depth of ice. The Russian vessels will be more heavily armed, with a 76 or 100 mm (3.0 or 3.9 in) main cannon, an anti-missile gatling gun, and launchers for eight cruise missiles.
