= Tulcea shipyard =

Shipyard in Romania

Coordinates: 45°11′36″N 28°47′05″E

Vard Shipyards Romania - Tulcea

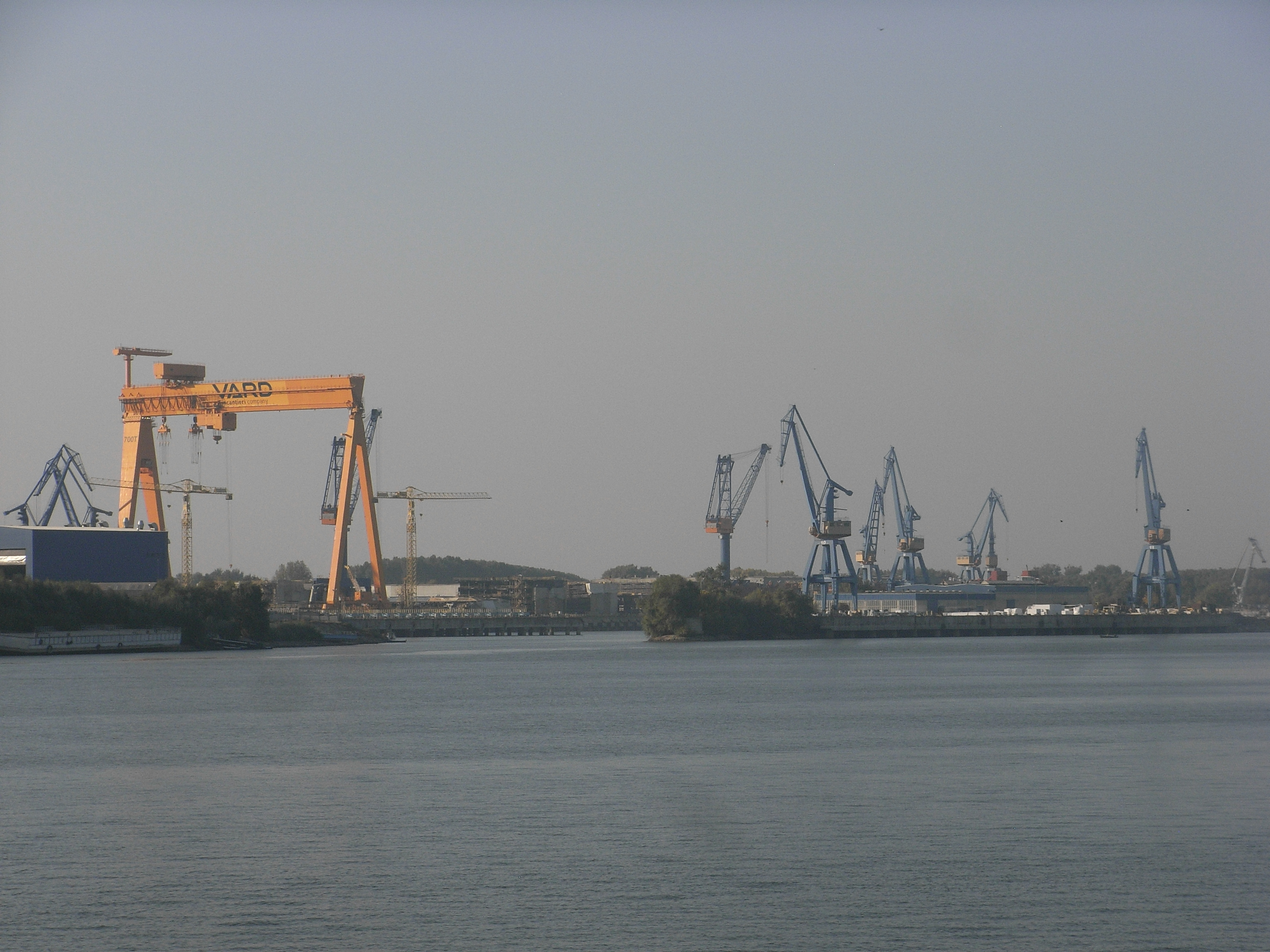
- View of the shipyard, 2018
- Industry: Shipbuilding, ship repair and conversion
- Founded: 21 March 1975; 51 years ago
- Headquarters: Tulcea, Romania
- Products: Commercial ships, riverboats, military ships
- Revenue: ▲2.7 billion RON (2024)
- Net income: ▼ -9.95 million RON (2024)
- Number of employees: 3,924 (2024)
- Parent: VARD
- Website: www.vard.com/location/romania/vard-tulcea

Shipyards of Romania

The Tulcea shipyard (Romanian: Șantierul Naval Tulcea), formally Vard Shipyards Romania - Tulcea, is a shipyard located on the banks of the Danube in the city of Tulcea. It was founded in 1975 for the repair of Romania's ocean fishing ships, and later expanded for building various commercial, river, technical and military ships.

== History ==
The shipyard was established on 21 March 1975. Initially, it was to serve for repairing Romania's ocean fishing vessels. The shipyard was later expanded to enable shipbuilding and, in 1985, it completed its first 7500 DWT cargo ship. Following the events of 1989, Tulcea began ship exports to the Western market in 1995. In 1996, the shipyard began collaborating with the Norwegian Aker Brattvaag AS. In 2000, the Tulcea shipyard was privatized with the Norwegian company acquiring the majority stake. By 2004, nearly $4 million were invested in the shipyard.

Initially named Aker Tulcea, it was renamed STX RO Offshore Tulcea in 2008 following the purchase of Aker Yards by the South Korean STX Offshore & Shipbuilding company. During this period, the shipyard continued to be modernized for the increasingly complex vessels. The current name of the shipyard dates to 2013, when Fincantieri purchased all the yards from the STX group, renaming the company from STX Europe to Vard.

== Operations ==
The shipyard offers a wide range of services from ship conversion and repair to shipbuilding with products including dredgers, fishing vessels, oil tankers, tugboats, container ships as well as military ships, with a capacity of up to 15000 - 16000 DWT. Between 1978 and 2015, the Tulcea shipyard delivered 393 vessels, 174 of which were delivered since its privatization.

Some of the more complex shipbuilding projects at the yard included the construction of the advanced cable-laying ships Leonardo Da Vinci and Mona Lisa for Prysmian Group. Between 2017 and 2019, the shipyard completed the hull construction of the yacht research vessel REV Ocean, contracted by businessman Kjell Inge Røkke.

In 2026, the US-based research organization Inkfish, owned by Gabe Newell, ordered a new deep-sea research vessel, named RV11000, which will feature the largest battery installation on a ship. The ship is also the largest order secured by Vard, worth $816 million. Another ship previously ordered by Inkfish, the RV6000, is being built by Vard at the Brăila shipyard.

Other important projects included the constructions of three Jan Mayen-class patrol vessels for the Norwegian Coast Guard, and six Ponant Explorers-class cruise ships for Compagnie du Ponant.

== Gallery ==
Notable ships built at Vard Tulcea

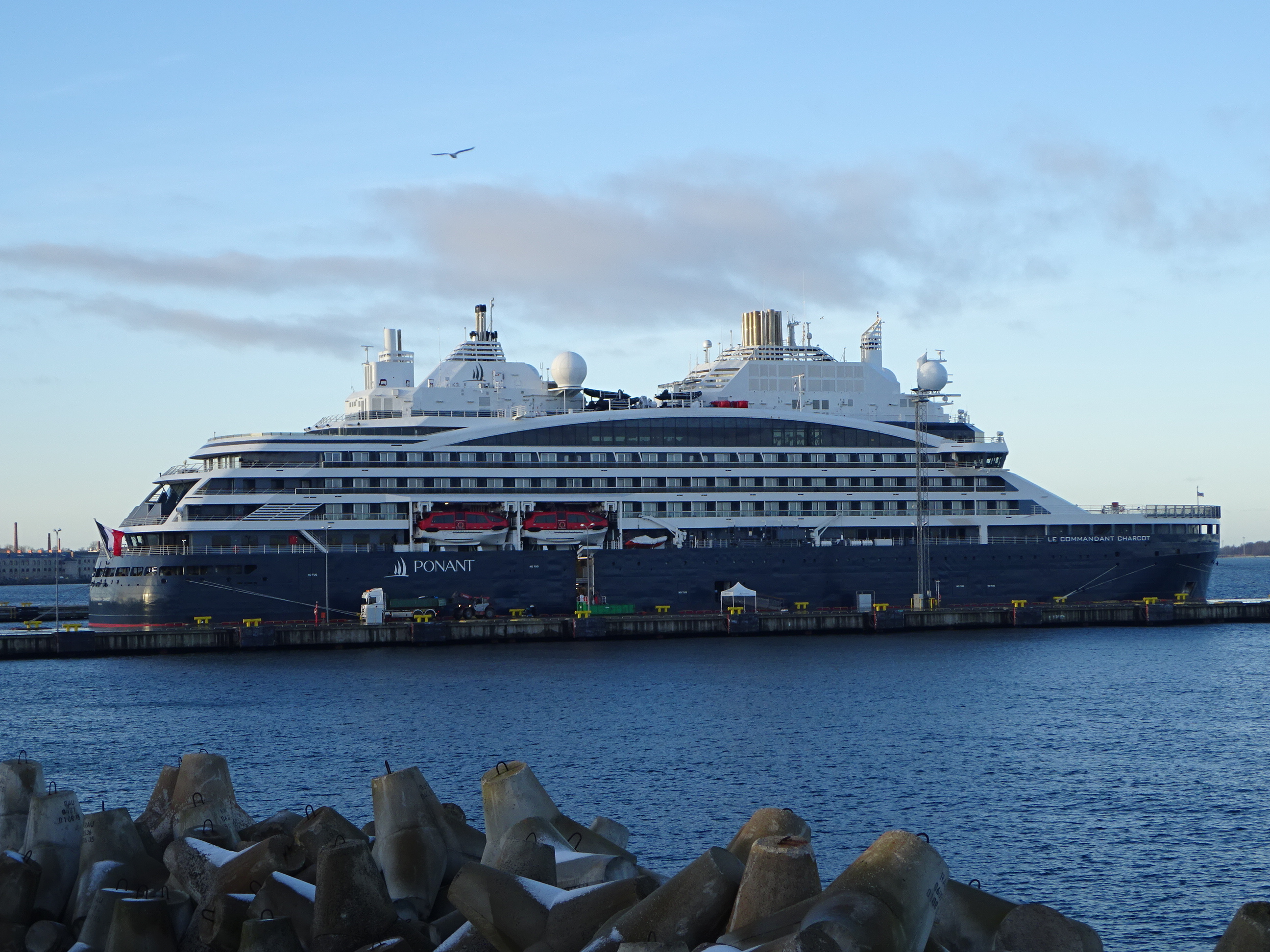
Le Commandant Charcot icebreaker cruise ship

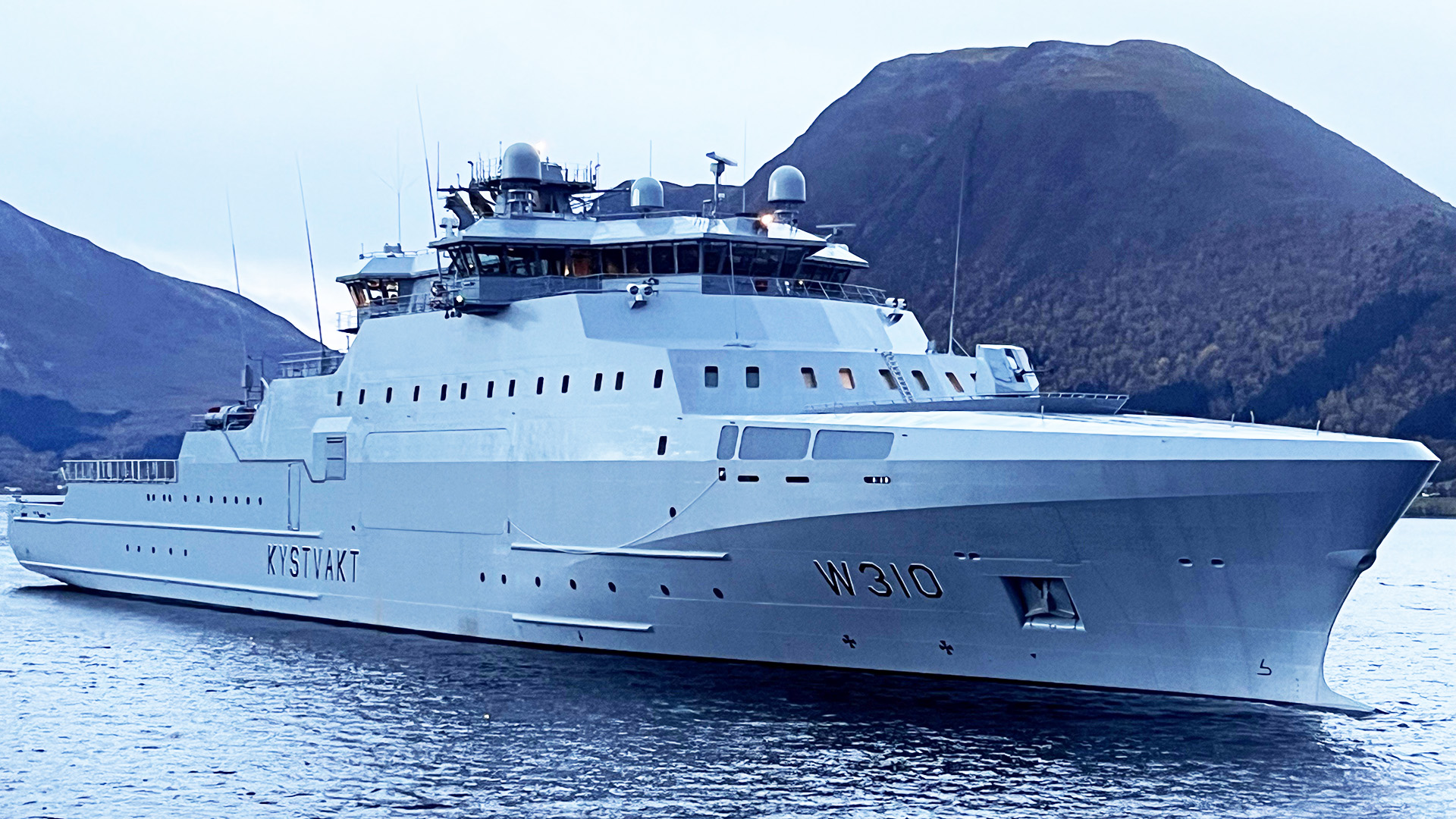
NoCGV Jan Mayen patrol vessel

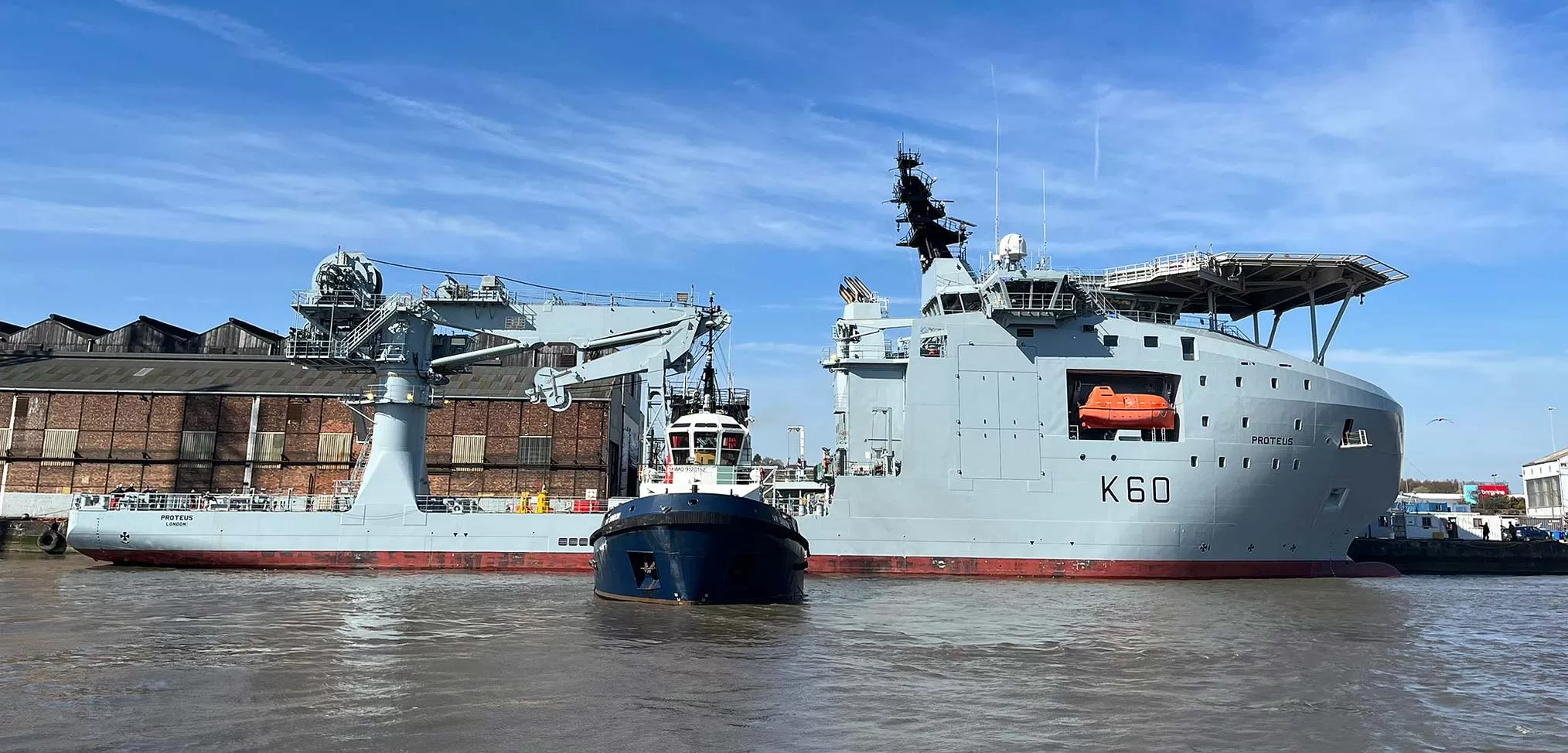
RFA Proteus (built as the Topaz Tangaroa platform supply vessel)

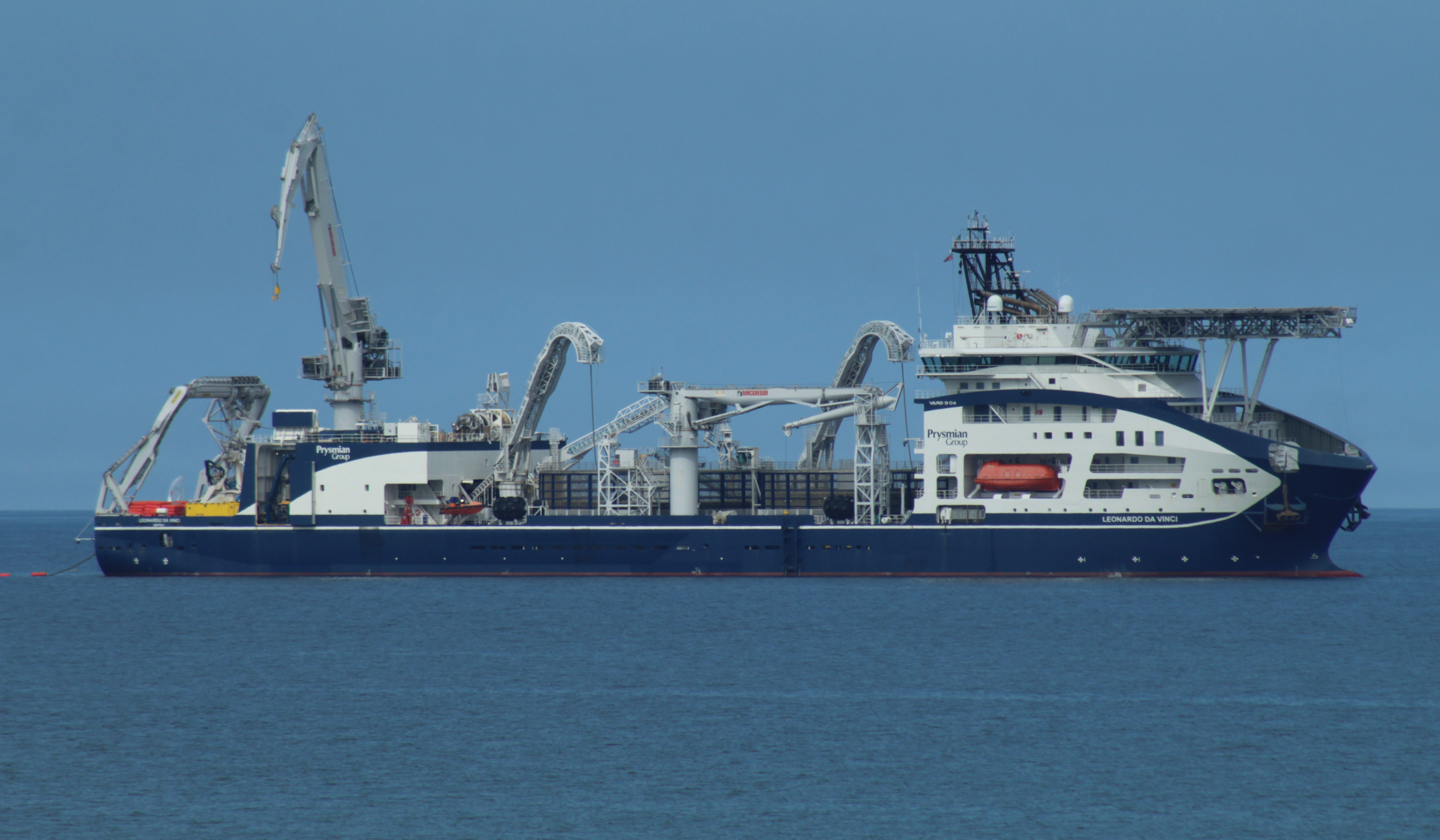
Leonardo Da Vinci cable layer

== See also ==
- Brăila shipyard (Vard Shipyards Romania - Brăila)
