= List of Royal Norwegian Navy bases =

Royal Norwegian Navy bases

A list of Royal Norwegian Navy bases both past and present.

== Active ==
- Haakonsvern orlogsstasjon established 1962, the main base.
- Ramsund Naval Base is a Norwegian logistics base and holds a detachment of Norwegian Naval EOD Commandos and includes training facilities for the Norwegian Naval Special Operations Command. While having no permanent troops stationed there, the US Navy rotates contractors and military personnel in order to maintain facilities and service US ships.
- Trondenes Fort established 1943, main base for the Norwegian Coastal Ranger Command.
- Sortland Naval Base, base for Coast Guard Squadron North of the Norwegian Coast Guard.
- KNM Harald Haarfagre at Madla, Royal Norwegian Navy (and Air Force) Basic Training Establishment.
- Karljohansvern former main base, minor units still present.
  - Including Norske Løve Fortress

== Ceremonial commands ==
Places where the Navy has the formal command and maintains a commandantship, but where the military activity beyond administration and ceremony is very low.

- Bergenhus Fortress (ca. 1200–today)
  - Including Sverresborg
- Vardøhus Fortress (1306–today)

== Former bases ==
- Olavsvern (?–2009) auxiliary base.
- Fredriksvern (1677–2002), was the main base until 1864.
- Hysnes orlogsstasjon (?–2002)
- Marvika orlogsstasjon(?–2002)
- Ulsnes orlogsstasjon(?–2002)

=== Coastal artillery forts and fortresses ===
Coastal artillery was part of the Navy organisation from 1934 until it was disbanded in 2002.

- Agdenes Fortress 1898 -
  - Brettingen Fort
  - Hysnes Fort
  - Hambara Fort
- Bolærne Fort (1916–2005) Located outside Tønsberg, outer oslofjord. Disbanded.
- Breiviknes Fort Disbanded
- Fjell Fortress (1942–2004), disbanded 1999, sold 2004.
- Grøtsund Fort Disbanded.
- Herdla Fort (1940–2001) Disbanded, now a museum.
- Korsnes Fort Disbanded, and demolished
- Krossodden Fort
- Kråkvåg Fort Disbanded and demolished
- Kvalvik Fort
- Malangen Fort Disbanded and demolished
- Meløyvær Fortress Disbanded, now a museum.
- Nes Fort (?–2001) Disbanded and demolished
- Nesje Fort (1940–2004), in the Sognefjord, the fort was handed over to the Norwegian Home Guard in 1958 and was operated by that organisation until 2004.
- Oddane Fort - maintained as a possible future museum.
- Odderøya Fort (1667–1999), at Odderøya near Kristiansand.
- Oscarsborg Fortress (1643–2003)
- Rauøy Fort Disbanded and partly demolished. Now a training ground for Norwegian special forces.
- Rødbergodden Fort
- Skjellanger Fort Disbanded
- Vigdel Fort, near Stavanger
- Visterøy Fort Disbanded
- Årøybukt Fort Disbanded
