= Nornen-class patrol vessel =

Norwegian coast guard patrol ship

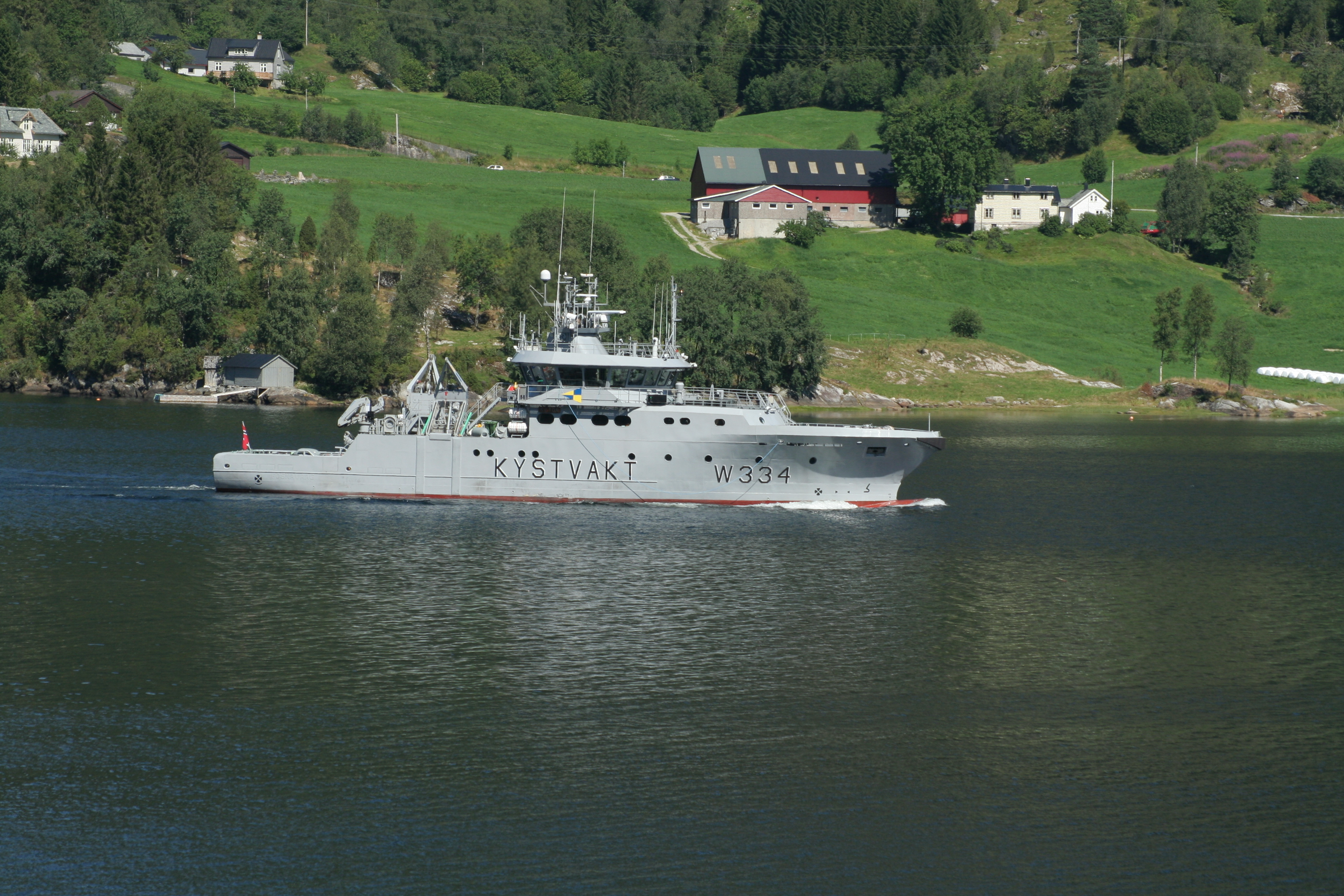
- NoCGV Tor, a Nornen-class ship, in inner Førdefjord, July 2008

Class overview
- Name: Nornen class
- Builders: Stocznia Remontowa Gryfia, Szczecin, Poland
- Operators: Norwegian Coast Guard
- Built: 2006–2007
- In commission: 2007–present
- Completed: 5
- Active: 5

General characteristics
- Type: Patrol vessel
- Tonnage: 761 GT
- Displacement: 743 t (731 long tons; 819 short tons)
- Length: 47.2 m (154 ft 10 in) o/a; 42 m (137 ft 10 in) p/p
- Beam: 10.3 m (33 ft 10 in)
- Draught: 3.25 m (10 ft 8 in)
- Depth: 5 m (16 ft 5 in) to main deck
- Ice class: 1C
- Propulsion: Diesel-electric, 2,200 kW (2,950 hp), 1 bow thruster
- Speed: 16 knots (30 km/h; 18 mph)
- Boats & landing craft carried: 2 × RHIB (to be replaced by a Sjøbjørn 38 /Seabear 38 from 2025-2026)
- Complement: 20
- Armament: 12.7 mm (0.50 in) machine gun
- Notes: Bollard pull: 20+ tons

The Nornen-class patrol vessel is a Norwegian inshore patrol vessel designed for coast guard duties such as search and rescue, fire fighting, environmental protection, customs duties and police duties.

== Design ==
The Nornen class consists of five vessels of the ST-610 design by Skipsteknisk AS. The contract for the delivery of these vessels was signed on November 24, 2004, and they were delivered with 12–14 months. The vessels were leased for 15 years. These purpose-built vessels replaced the five oldest vessels in the inshore coast guard (No:Indre Kystvakt). They provided significantly improved capabilities in all regards compared to the vessels they replaced. This included seaworthiness (they are larger), towing capacity, fire fighting and environmental protection (collecting oil spills). The aft deck is for the winch only (not for helicopter landing).

The Reine-class patrol vessel shares the same basic design, but is modified for the use of the Norwegian Sea Home Guard.

== Service history ==
In October 2011 the Norwegian government announced that they had bought the five ships for 477 million kroner from Remøy Shipping, from whom they previously leased the ships, for a projected saving of 111 million kroner before the vessels are scrapped around 2030.

== Ships in class ==
The vessels of the Nornen class are named after Norse mythology gods and beings. The Norwegian prefix for the vessels is KV instead of NoCGV.

- NoCGV Nornen (W330)
- NoCGV Farm (W331)
- NoCGV Heimdal (W332)
- NoCGV Njord (W333)
- NoCGV Tor (W334)
