= NoCGV Tromsø =

History

Norway
- Name: NoCGV Tromsø
- Builder: Naval Shipyard Gdynia
- In service: April 1996
- Identification: IMO number: 9152882; Callsign: LIOA

General characteristics
- Displacement: 2,100 t (full load)
- Length: 70.0 m (229 ft 8 in)
- Beam: 12.40 metres (40 ft 8 in)
- Draught: 5.50 m (18 ft 1 in)
- Propulsion: 1 × diesel, 1 shaft, 3,600 bhp (2,700 kW)
- Speed: 17 kn (20 mph; 31 km/h)
- Complement: 5 officers, 10 enlisted, 5 civilians
- Armament: 1 × 40 mm/L60 Bofors cannon

NoCGV Tromsø was a purpose-built, but leased, offshore patrol vessel for the Norwegian Coast Guard.

NoCGV Tromsø is named after the city Tromsø in northern Norway. She is a 1,900-ton vessel with a Bofors 40 mm gun. NoCGV Tromsø is used for general EEZ patrol, including fishery inspection and search and rescue. NoCGV Tromsø was originally assigned to KV Nord (Norwegian Coastguard North), but during the end of her career was stationed with KV Sør (Norwegian Coastguard South), with base at Haakonsvern.

The NoCGV Tromsø's lease contract ran out on March 20, 2007. She was set to be replaced with a ship of the Barentshav-class in 2008. The leased fishing vessel NoCGV Leikvin took over Tromsø's patrol area until the new ship arrived.

The Tromsø now serves as a Panamanian-registered survey vessel named Fugro Discovery.
