= Nordkapp-class patrol vessel =

Class of Norwegian Coast Guard ship

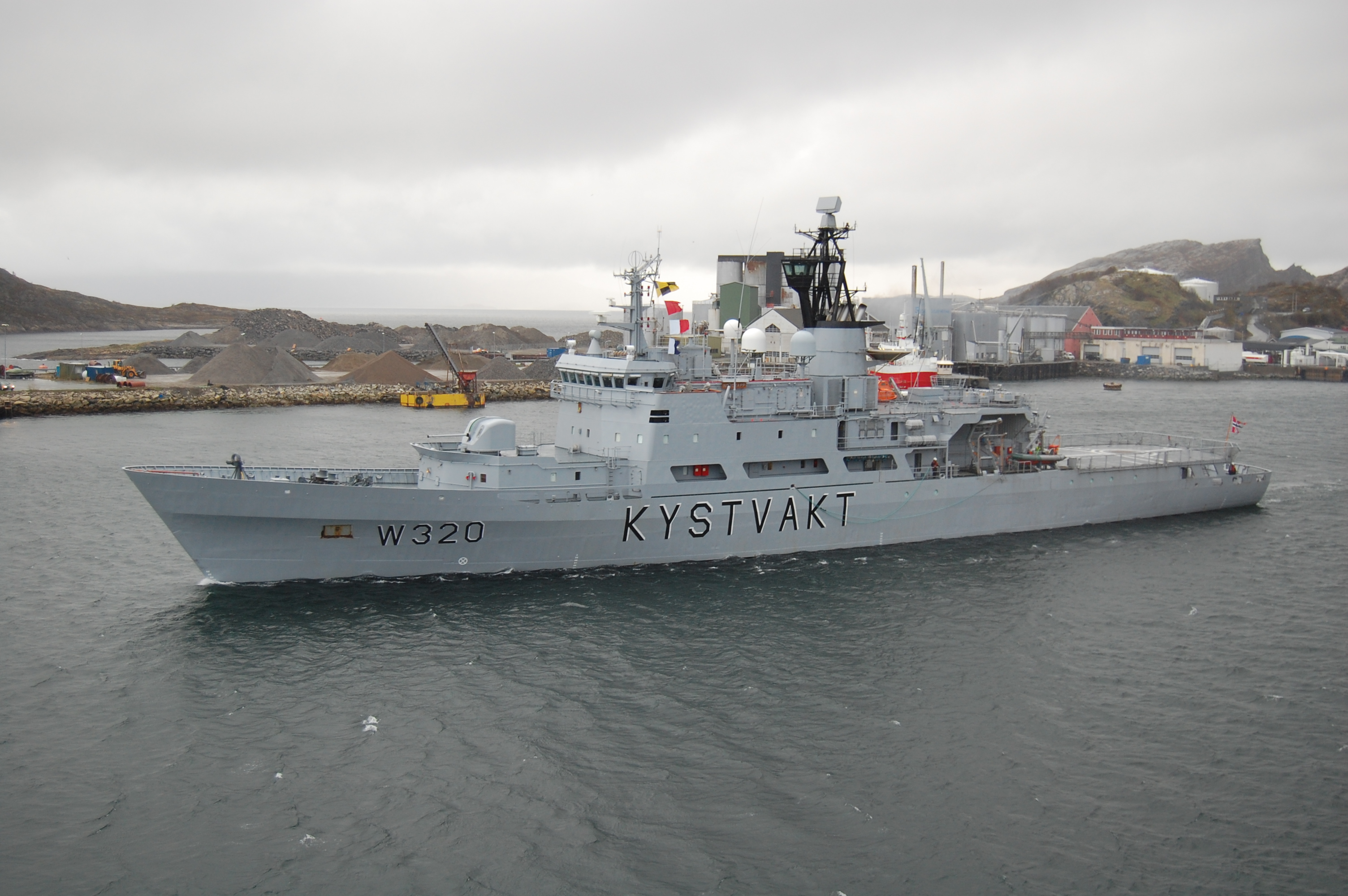
- NoCGV Nordkapp in Bodø harbour

Class overview
- Name: Nordkapp class
- Operators: Norwegian Coast Guard/Royal Norwegian Navy
- Completed: 3
- Active: 1
- Retired: 2

General characteristics
- Type: Offshore patrol vessel
- Displacement: 3,200 tons
- Length: 105.05 m (344.7 ft)
- Propulsion: Wichmann 4 x 9AXAG
- Speed: 22 knots (41 km/h; 25 mph)
- Range: 7,500 miles
- Crew: 52 + 6 (Helicopter)
- Sensors & processing systems: EADS TRS-3D 16 ES air/surface radar (from 2006); 2 x navigational radars; 1 CelsiusTech 9LV 218 Fire Control; Simrad SS105 hull-mounted sonar
- Electronic warfare & decoys: Can carry an Electronic Warfare system and decoys
- Armament: 1 × Bofors 57 mm cannon; 12.7 mm machine guns; Depth charges; Provisions for carrying Penguin missiles, torpedoes, 20 mm guns, and Mistral surface to air missiles if required
- Aircraft carried: 1 × Lynx (at launch)
- Aviation facilities: Hangar for a single helicopter

The Nordkapp class is a Norwegian Coast Guard ship class built in the 1980s, and used for rescue, fishery inspection, research purposes and general EEZ patrol in Norwegian waters until the early 2020s. It is a class of ships purpose-built for the Norwegian Coast Guard with a secondary role as wartime naval escorts. The Norwegian Coast Guard is a part of the Royal Norwegian Navy, and has some police authority.

In June 2018 it was announced that the Vard Group, a subsidiary of Fincantieri, would build three replacement vessels for NOK 5 billion; delivery of the three new vessels started in 2023 with the final vessel envisaged in 2024. As of November 2023, only Nordkapp remains operational, having been transferred to the Navy to fulfill a mine warfare command role. The other vessels have been decommissioned.

== Design ==
The Nordkapp class carried one helicopter at launch, the Westland Lynx, but was decommissioned in 2014. The ships are capable of ice browsing. Due to the fact that these vessels may serve as wartime naval escorts they have provisions to carry additional weapons and sensors, such as anti-ship missiles and torpedoes.

== Namesake ==
The Nordkapp-class is named after North Cape, in Norwegian: Nordkapp, which is also the name of one of the vessels of the class.

A fisheries protection vessel named Nordkapp served the Royal Norwegian Navy from 1937 to 1954, including distinguished World War II service.

== History ==
NoCGV Andenes patrolled the Persian Gulf during the Gulf War in 1991 as part of the Coalition forces. In 1994, the ship was involved in an altercation with the Sea Shepherd Conservation Society's ship Whales Forever, leading to a collision and damage to both ships.

The Nordkapp-class vessels are to be replaced from 2022 by the new, and larger, Jan-Mayen class patrol vessels currently under construction.

NoCGV Senja was decommissioned in November 2021 followed by Andenes in October 2023.

NoCGV Nordkapp was transferred to the Navy's mine warfare branch in November 2022, and changed her prefix to HNoMS. In 2023 she operated as the flagship in Standing NATO Mine Countermeasures Group 1.

== Ships ==
The class consists of three vessels:

- NoCGV Nordkapp (W320) - transferred to the navy as HNoMS Nordkapp (A531) on 1 November 2022. Mine countermeasures command role; served as the flagship of Standing NATO Mine Countermeasures Group 1 in 2023.
- NoCGV Senja (W321) - Decommissioned November 2021
- NoCGV Andenes (W322) - Decommissioned October 2023
