= NoCGV Harstad =

Offshore patrol vessel of the Norwegian Coast Guard

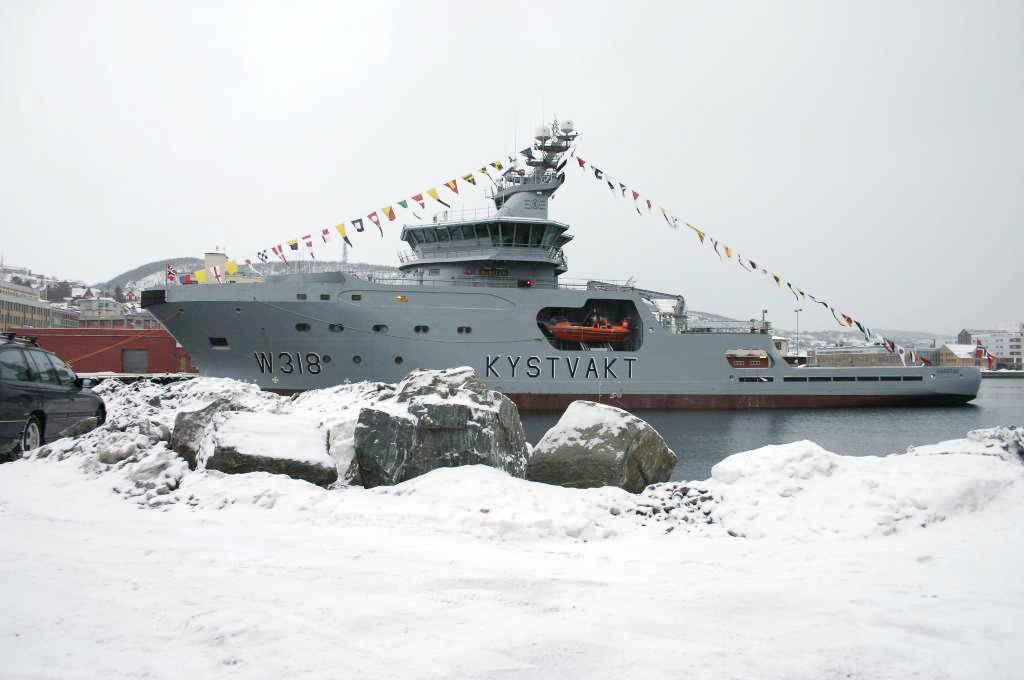
- NoCGV Harstad moored in Harstad

History

Norway
- Name: NoCGV Harstad
- Namesake: The town of Harstad
- Builder: Søviknes yard
- Commissioned: January 2005
- In service: 2009
- Identification: IMO number: 9312107; MMSI number: 259050000; Callsign: JWBR; Pennant number: W318
- Status: Active

General characteristics
- Class & type: Offshore Patrol Vessel
- Type: Patrol and Oil recovery vessel
- Displacement: 3,121 long tons (3,171 t)
- Length: 270 ft (82 m)
- Beam: 51 ft (16 m)
- Depth: 6 m (20 ft)
- Propulsion: Two Bergen Engines B32:40 Diesel Engines, 4000kW each; Two screws; one azimuth thruster, 883kW
- Speed: 18.4 knots (34.1 km/h; 21.2 mph)
- Boats & landing craft carried: 2 × MOB boats type NORSAFE
- Complement: 26
- Armament: 40 mm Bofors
- Notes: Crane: 15m/5 tons; Modified to support the Nato Submarine Rescue System

NoCGV Harstad is a purpose-built offshore patrol vessel for the Norwegian Coast Guard. She is named after the city Harstad in Northern Norway.

Harstad was built as a multipurpose vessel, but optimised for emergency towing of large oil tankers (up to 200,000 tonnes deadweight (DWT)), oil spill clean-up and fire fighting. The most common duty will be fishery inspection and search and rescue in Norway's large exclusive economic zone.

Harstad is equipped for the NATO Submarine Rescue System.

== Construction and service ==
Harstad was built in 2005 to a UT 512 design. The hull was constructed at Aker Yards in Tulcea, Romania, before the vessel was completed and outfitted at Søviknes Verft in Norway. It was delivered in 2005 and initially leased to the Coast Guard by the civilian shipping company Remøy Shipping. In 2009, the Coast Guard formally took over the vessel and has since been responsible for its operation and crewing.

=== Mid-life update ===
In 2023, a mid-life update of the ship was approved, with an initial budget framework of NOK 235 million. The contract was signed around the turn of 2025/2026, but the project has been delayed due to contractual and financial factors. The upgrade is expected to begin in late 2026 at the earliest, with the vessel returning to operational service around 2028.

== See also ==
- ICGV Þór (2009)
- Barentshav class OPV
