= List of active Royal Norwegian Navy ships =

The Royal Norwegian Navy is the branch of the Norwegian Armed Forces responsible for naval operations of the state of Norway. As of 2008, the RNoN consists of approximately 3,700 personnel (9,450 in mobilized state, 32,000 when fully mobilized) and 69 vessels, including 4 frigates, 6 submarines, 6 corvettes, 3 minesweepers, 3 minehunters, 3 support vessels and 2 training vessels. The navy also includes the Coast Guard.

In Norwegian, Royal Norwegian Navy vessels have since 1946 been given the ship prefix "KNM", short for Kongelig Norske Marine (Royal Norwegian Navy). In English, they are given the prefix "HNoMS", short for "His/Her Norwegian Majesty's Ship" ("HNMS" could be also used for the Royal Netherlands Navy, for which "HNLMS" is used instead). Coast Guard vessels are given the prefix "KV" for KystVakt (Coast Guard) in Norwegian and "NoCGV" for Norwegian Coast Guard Vessel in English.

== Active fleet ==
=== Navy ===
==== Submarines ====
| Class | In service | Origin | Picture | Type | Ship | No. | Comm. | Dp. | Notes |
|---|---|---|---|---|---|---|---|---|---|
| Ula class Type 210 | 6 | Germany; Norway | | Diesel-electricattack submarines | HNoMS Ula | S300 | 1988 | 1,150 tonnes (submerged); 1,040 tonnes (surfaced) | |
| Ula class Type 210 | 6 | Germany; Norway | | Diesel-electricattack submarines | HNoMS Utsira | S301 | 1991 | 1,150 tonnes (submerged); 1,040 tonnes (surfaced) | |
| Ula class Type 210 | 6 | Germany; Norway | | Diesel-electricattack submarines | HNoMS Utstein | S302 | 1991 | 1,150 tonnes (submerged); 1,040 tonnes (surfaced) | |
| Ula class Type 210 | 6 | Germany; Norway | | Diesel-electricattack submarines | HNoMS Utvær | S303 | 1990 | 1,150 tonnes (submerged); 1,040 tonnes (surfaced) | |
| Ula class Type 210 | 6 | Germany; Norway | | Diesel-electricattack submarines | HNoMS Uthaug | S304 | 1991 | 1,150 tonnes (submerged); 1,040 tonnes (surfaced) | |
| Ula class Type 210 | 6 | Germany; Norway | | Diesel-electricattack submarines | KNM Uredd | S305 | 1990 | 1,150 tonnes (submerged); 1,040 tonnes (surfaced) | |

==== Surface warship fleet ====
Fleet in service
| Class | In service | Origin | Picture | Type | Ship | No. | Comm. | Dp. | Notes |
Frigates (4)
| Fridtjof Nansen class (Derivative of F-100 frigate - Álvaro de Bazán class) | 4 | Spain | | ASW frigate | HNoMS Fridtjof Nansen | F310 | 2006 | 5,290 tonnes | The 5th frigate of this class, the HNoMS Helge Ingstad sunk in 2018. To be replaced by 5 frigates. |
| Fridtjof Nansen class (Derivative of F-100 frigate - Álvaro de Bazán class) | 4 | Spain | | ASW frigate | HNoMS Roald Amundsen | F311 | 2007 | 5,290 tonnes | The 5th frigate of this class, the HNoMS Helge Ingstad sunk in 2018. To be replaced by 5 frigates. |
| Fridtjof Nansen class (Derivative of F-100 frigate - Álvaro de Bazán class) | 4 | Spain | | ASW frigate | HNoMS Otto Sverdrup | F312 | 2008 | 5,290 tonnes | The 5th frigate of this class, the HNoMS Helge Ingstad sunk in 2018. To be replaced by 5 frigates. |
| Fridtjof Nansen class (Derivative of F-100 frigate - Álvaro de Bazán class) | 4 | Spain | | ASW frigate | HNoMS Thor Heyerdahl | F314 | 2011 | 5,290 tonnes | The 5th frigate of this class, the HNoMS Helge Ingstad sunk in 2018. To be replaced by 5 frigates. |
Corvettes (6)
| Skjold class | 6 | Norway | | Coastal corvette | HNoMS Skjold | P960 | 1999 | 274 tonnes | To be replaced by 2030 by 6 vessels. |
| Skjold class | 6 | Norway | | Coastal corvette | HNoMS Storm | P961 | 2010 | 274 tonnes | To be replaced by 2030 by 6 vessels. |
| Skjold class | 6 | Norway | | Coastal corvette | HNoMS Skudd | P962 | 2010 | 274 tonnes | To be replaced by 2030 by 6 vessels. |
| Skjold class | 6 | Norway | | Coastal corvette | HNoMS Steil | P963 | 2011 | 274 tonnes | To be replaced by 2030 by 6 vessels. |
| Skjold class | 6 | Norway | | Coastal corvette | HNoMS Glimt | P964 | 2012 | 274 tonnes | To be replaced by 2030 by 6 vessels. |
| Skjold class | 6 | Norway | | Coastal corvette | HNoMS Gnist | P965 | 2012 | 274 tonnes | To be replaced by 2030 by 6 vessels. |
Quick marine reaction (18)
| CB90 class Stridsbåt 90N | 6 | Sweden | | Fast assault craft | KNM Hellen | L4512 | 1996 | 13 tonnes (empty); 20 tonnes (full load) | 20 purchased, 6 left in service. Upgraded in 2014 with new engines and a Kongsberg Sea Protector RCWS equipped with a M2 machine gun. |
| CB90 class Stridsbåt 90N | 6 | Sweden | | Fast assault craft | KNM Tangen | L4526 | – | 13 tonnes (empty); 20 tonnes (full load) | 20 purchased, 6 left in service. Upgraded in 2014 with new engines and a Kongsberg Sea Protector RCWS equipped with a M2 machine gun. |
| CB90 class Stridsbåt 90N | 6 | Sweden | | Fast assault craft | KNM Møvik | L4514 | – | 13 tonnes (empty); 20 tonnes (full load) | 20 purchased, 6 left in service. Upgraded in 2014 with new engines and a Kongsberg Sea Protector RCWS equipped with a M2 machine gun. |
| CB90 class Stridsbåt 90N | 6 | Sweden | | Fast assault craft | KNM Malmøya | L4528 | – | 13 tonnes (empty); 20 tonnes (full load) | 20 purchased, 6 left in service. Upgraded in 2014 with new engines and a Kongsberg Sea Protector RCWS equipped with a M2 machine gun. |
| CB90 class Stridsbåt 90N | 6 | Sweden | | Fast assault craft | KNM Osternes | L4532 | – | 13 tonnes (empty); 20 tonnes (full load) | 20 purchased, 6 left in service. Upgraded in 2014 with new engines and a Kongsberg Sea Protector RCWS equipped with a M2 machine gun. |
| CB90 class Stridsbåt 90N | 6 | Sweden | | Fast assault craft | KNM Oddane | L4527 | – | 13 tonnes (empty); 20 tonnes (full load) | 20 purchased, 6 left in service. Upgraded in 2014 with new engines and a Kongsberg Sea Protector RCWS equipped with a M2 machine gun. |
| IC20M serie Interceptor Craft | 2 | Sweden | | Fast patrol boat | KNM August Nærø | – | 2015 | | Manufactured by Dockstavarvet AB. |
| IC20M serie Interceptor Craft | 2 | Sweden | | Fast patrol boat | KNM Petter B Salen | – | 2017 | | Manufactured by Dockstavarvet AB. |
| Goldfish 36 | 10 | Norway | | Rigid hull inflatable boat | – | – | – | – | Goldfish Boats AS |
| Sea-Doo | – | Canada | – | Jet skis | – | – | – | – | RXT-X RS/ RXP-X 325 |
Mine countermeasures vessels (5)
| Nordkapp class | 1 | Norway | | Mine countermeasure command vessel (ex OPV) | HNoMS Nordkapp | A531 | 2022 (1982) | 3,320 tonnes | Ex W320 transferred to the Navy |
| Oksøy class | 2 | Norway | | Minehunter | HNoMS Måløy | M342 | 1995 | 375 tonnes | |
| Oksøy class | 2 | Norway | | Minehunter | HNoMS Hinnøy | M343 | 1995 | 375 tonnes | |
| Alta class | 2 | Norway | | Minesweeper | HNoMS Otra | M351 | 1996 | 375 tonnes | |
| Alta class | 2 | Norway | | Minesweeper | HNoMS Rauma | M352 | 1996 | 375 tonnes | |

==== Auxiliary ships ====
| Class | In service | Origin | Picture | Type | Ship | No. | Comm. | Dp. | Notes |
Logistics ships (3)
| AEGIR class | 1 | South Korea | | Auxiliary Oil Replenishment | HNoMS Maud | A530 | 2019 | 27,500 tonnes | |
| Reine class | 2 | Poland | | Logistics command vessels | HNoMS Olav Tryggvason | A536 (P380) | 2013 (2010) | 760 tonnes | Delays in HNoMS Maud, former inner coast guard vessels transferred to Navy as support vessels. Since 2013 in Navy logistics command. |
| Reine class | 2 | Poland | | Logistics command vessels | HNoMS Magnus Lagabøte | A537 (P381) | 2018 (2011) | 760 tonnes | Used by: Norwegian Home Guard: 2011 - 13; Norwegian Coast Guard: 2013 - 18; Navy logistics command: since 2018. |
Yacht (1)
| – | 1 | United Kingdom | | Royal yacht | HNoMY Norge | A553 | 1948 | 1,628 tonnes | |
Autonomous Underwater Vehicle (–)
| Kongsberg 2X HUGIN | – | Norway | (Illustration) | Autonomous Underwater Vehicle | – | – | – | – | Contained in 20' container. |

=== Intelligence Service ===
| Class | In service | Origin | Picture | Type | Ship | No. | Comm. | Dp. | Notes |
Signal intelligence ships
| – | 1 | Norway | | ELINT collection vessel | FS Eger | | 1995 | 7,560 tonnes | Former FS Marjata III. |
| – | 1 | Romania; United States; Norway | | ELINT collection vessel | FS Marjata IV | – | 2016 | 21,040 tonnes | |

=== Coast Guard ===
==== Outer Coast Guard ====
This unit of the coast guard specialises in asserting sovereignty over the exclusive economic zone of the coast of Norway and Svalbard, and it uses the following ships:

| Class | In service | Origin | Picture | Type | Ship | No. | Comm. | Dp. | Notes |
Patrol Vessels (8)
| NoCGV Svalbard | 1 | Norway | | Icebreaker / offshore patrol vessel | KV Svalbard | W303 | 2001 | 6,375 tonnes | |
| NoCGV Harstad | 1 | Norway | | Offshore patrol vessel | KV Harstad | W318 | 2005 | 3,130 tonnes | Rolls-Royce Marine AS design. |
| Barentshav class | 3 | Norway | | Offshore patrol vessel | KV Barentshav | W340 | 2009 | 4,000 tonnes | |
| Barentshav class | 3 | Norway | | Offshore patrol vessel | KV Bergen | W341 | 2010 | 4,000 tonnes | |
| Barentshav class | 3 | Norway | | Offshore patrol vessel | KV Sortland | W342 | 2010 | 4,000 tonnes | |
| Jan Mayen class | 3 | Norway | | Offshore patrol vessel | KV Jan Mayen | W310 | 2023 | 9,800 tonnes | CBRN protection and is ice-strengthened. |
| Jan Mayen class | 3 | Norway | | Offshore patrol vessel | KV Bjørnøya | W311 | 2023 | 9,800 tonnes | CBRN protection and is ice-strengthened. |
| Jan Mayen class | 3 | Norway | | Offshore patrol vessel | KV Hopen | W312 | 2024 | 9,800 tonnes | CBRN protection and is ice-strengthened. |
Support vessels (2)
| VS 491 CD; Bergen Group Fosen | 2 | Norway | | Emergency towing vessels / platform supply vessel | KV Bison | W323 | 2020 | 6,250 tonnes | Second-hand ships built in 2012 - 2014. Ships leased. |
| VS 491 CD; Bergen Group Fosen | 2 | Norway | | Emergency towing vessels / platform supply vessel | KV Jarl | W324 | 2020 | 6,250 tonnes | Second-hand ships built in 2012 - 2014. Ships leased. |

==== Inner Coast Guard ====
Ships
| Class | In service | Origin | Picture | Type | Ship | No. | Comm. | Dp. | Notes |
Patrol vessels (5)
| Nornen class ST-610 design | 5 | Norway; Poland | | Patrol vessels | KV Nornen | W330 | 2007 | 675 tonnes | Skipsteknisk AS design, made in Poland. |
| Nornen class ST-610 design | 5 | Norway; Poland | | Patrol vessels | KV Farm | W331 | 2007 | 675 tonnes | Skipsteknisk AS design, made in Poland. |
| Nornen class ST-610 design | 5 | Norway; Poland | | Patrol vessels | KV Heimdal | W332 | 2007 | 675 tonnes | Skipsteknisk AS design, made in Poland. |
| Nornen class ST-610 design | 5 | Norway; Poland | | Patrol vessels | KV Njord | W333 | 2007 | 675 tonnes | Skipsteknisk AS design, made in Poland. |
| Nornen class ST-610 design | 5 | Norway; Poland | | Patrol vessels | KV Tor | W334 | 2007 | 675 tonnes | Skipsteknisk AS design, made in Poland. |

== Future fleet ==
=== On order ===
==== Submarines ====
| Class | On order | Origin | Picture | Type | Ship | No. | Comm. | Dp. | Notes |
|---|---|---|---|---|---|---|---|---|---|
| Type 212CD | 6 | Germany; Norway | | Attack submarine | – | – | 2029 | 2,800 tonnes (submerged); 2,500 tonnes (surfaced) | Orders: 4 in 2021; 2 in 2025 |
| Type 212CD | 6 | Germany; Norway | | Attack submarine | – | – | 2031 | 2,800 tonnes (submerged); 2,500 tonnes (surfaced) | Orders: 4 in 2021; 2 in 2025 |
| Type 212CD | 6 | Germany; Norway | | Attack submarine | – | – | 2033 | 2,800 tonnes (submerged); 2,500 tonnes (surfaced) | Orders: 4 in 2021; 2 in 2025 |
| Type 212CD | 6 | Germany; Norway | | Attack submarine | – | – | 2035 | 2,800 tonnes (submerged); 2,500 tonnes (surfaced) | Orders: 4 in 2021; 2 in 2025 |
| Type 212CD | 6 | Germany; Norway | | Attack submarine | – | – | – | 2,800 tonnes (submerged); 2,500 tonnes (surfaced) | Orders: 4 in 2021; 2 in 2025 |
| Type 212CD | 6 | Germany; Norway | | Attack submarine | – | – | – | 2,800 tonnes (submerged); 2,500 tonnes (surfaced) | Orders: 4 in 2021; 2 in 2025 |

==== Surface fleet ====
| Class | Quantity ordered | Origin | Picture | Type | Ship | No. | Comm. | Dp. | Notes |
Frigates (5)
| Type 26 frigate | 5 (+ options) | United Kingdom | (Illustration) | ASW frigate | – | – | 2030 | 8,000 tonnes | |
| Type 26 frigate | 5 (+ options) | United Kingdom | (Illustration) | ASW frigate | – | – | 2032 | 8,000 tonnes | |
| Type 26 frigate | 5 (+ options) | United Kingdom | (Illustration) | ASW frigate | – | – | – | 8,000 tonnes | |
| Type 26 frigate | 5 (+ options) | United Kingdom | (Illustration) | ASW frigate | – | – | – | 8,000 tonnes | |
| Type 26 frigate | 5 (+ options) | United Kingdom | (Illustration) | ASW frigate | – | – | – | 8,000 tonnes | |
Quick marine reaction (2)
| Combatant Craft Medium (CCM) | 2 (+ options) | United States | | Multi-mission surface tactical mobility vessel | – | – | 2026 | 29.8 tonnes | 2 ordered in 2023, planned for 2025 |
| Combatant Craft Medium (CCM) | 2 (+ options) | United States | | Multi-mission surface tactical mobility vessel | – | – | 2026 | 29.8 tonnes | 2 ordered in 2023, planned for 2025 |

=== Planned orders ===
==== Surface fleet ====
| Programme | Quantity planned | Origin | Type | Comm. planned | Notes |
|---|---|---|---|---|---|
| Standardised, flexible platforms 90-meter 2000-tonne vessels | 10 | Norway | Multi-mission offshore large vessel (logistics, support operations to surveillance and preparedness) | – | Ulstein Group and Larsnes Mek will compete to manufacture them. |
| Standardised, flexible platforms 55-meter vessel | 18 | Norway | Multi-mission offshore standard vessel (logistics, support operations to surveillance and preparedness) | – | Ulstein Group and Larsnes Mek will compete to manufacture them. |
| Amphibious assault vessel | – | Germany; Norway | Amphibious assault craft | – | Norway and the UK collaborate on is looking for a new coastal ranger commando vessel. |

== See also ==
- Royal Norwegian Navy
  - Equipment of the Norwegian Navy
- Norwegian Army
  - Equipment of the Norwegian Army
- Royal Norwegian Air Force
  - Aircraft of the Norwegian Air Force
