= USS Ogden (LPD-5) =

Austin-class amphibious transport dock

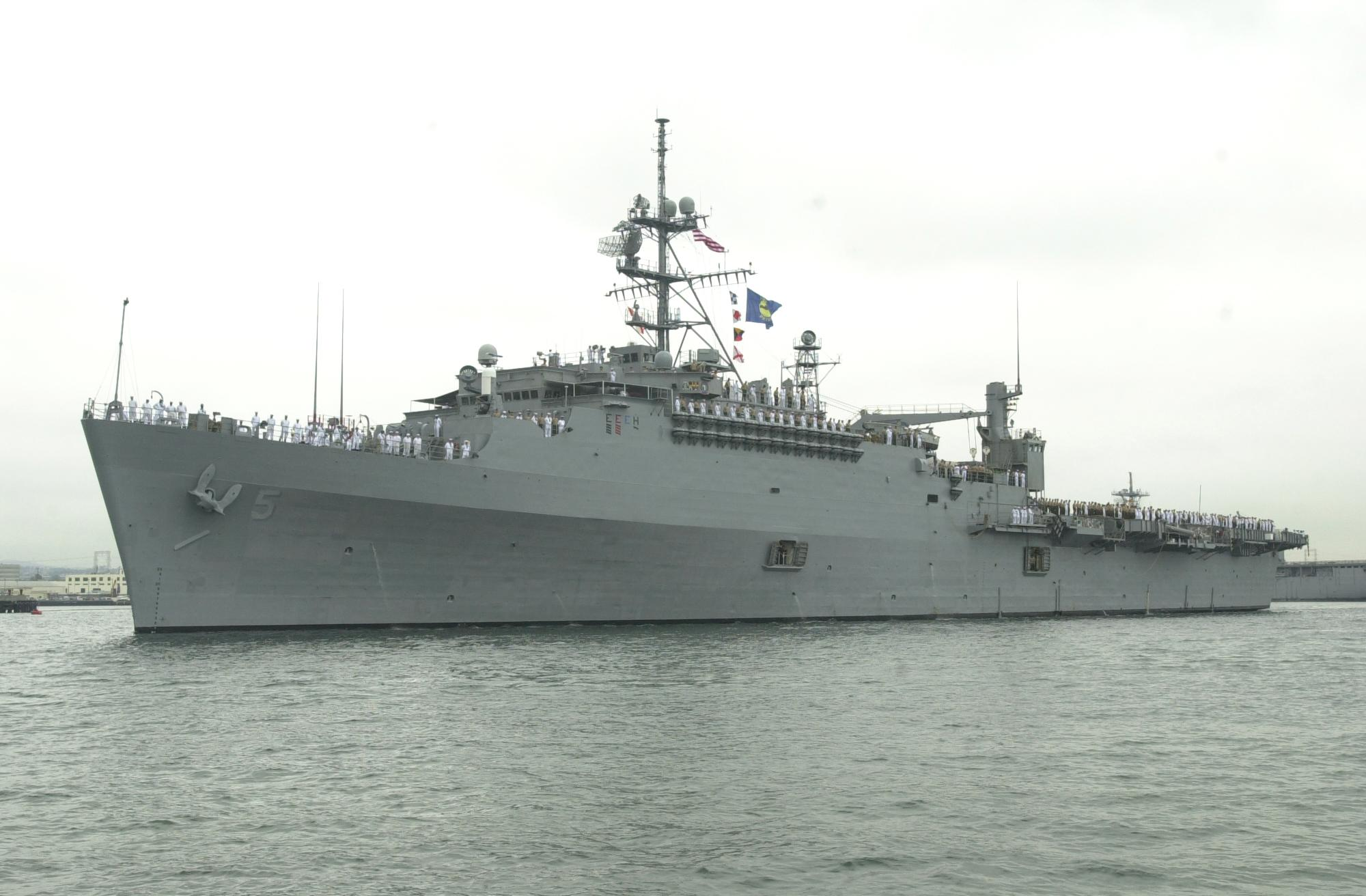
- USS Ogden

History

United States
- Name: Ogden
- Namesake: Ogden, Utah
- Ordered: 21 September 1961
- Laid down: 4 February 1963
- Launched: 27 June 1964
- Commissioned: 19 June 1965
- Decommissioned: 21 February 2007
- Home port: San Diego, California
- Identification: Hull number: LPD-5
- Motto: Flexible Response
- Nickname(s): "Oggie Doggie"
- Fate: Sunk as target 10 July 2014
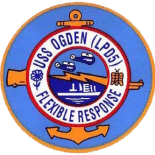
- Badge

General characteristics
- Class & type: Austin-class amphibious transport dock
- Tonnage: 7,408 DWT
- Displacement: 9962 tons light, 17370 tons full
- Length: 173.4 m (569 ft) overall, 167 meters (548 ft) waterline
- Beam: 32.9 m (108 ft) extreme, 25.6 meters (84 ft) waterline
- Draft: 6.7 m (22 ft) maximum, 7 meters (23 ft) limit
- Propulsion: Two Babcock Willcox 600 psi (4,100 kPa) boilers, two steam turbines
- Speed: 21 knots (39 km/h; 24 mph)
- Capacity: One LCAC or one LCU or four LCM-8 or nine LCM-6 or 24 amphibious assault vehicles (AAV)
- Complement: 24 officers, 396 enlisted (plus 900 U.S. Marines and others)
- Armament: 2 × 20 mm Phalanx CIWS; 2 × 25 mm Mk 38 guns; 8 × .50-caliber machine guns
- Aircraft carried: None, but telescopic hangar installed aboard. The hangar is not used to accommodate helicopters but on the flight deck there is space for up to six CH-46 helicopters.

USS Ogden (LPD-5), an Austin-class amphibious transport dock, was the second ship of the United States Navy to be named for Ogden, Utah. Ogden was laid down on 4 February 1963 by the New York Naval Shipyard. She was launched on 27 June 1964 sponsored by Mrs. Laurence J. Burton, and commissioned at New York City on 19 June 1965.

== Operational history ==
=== Vietnam era ===
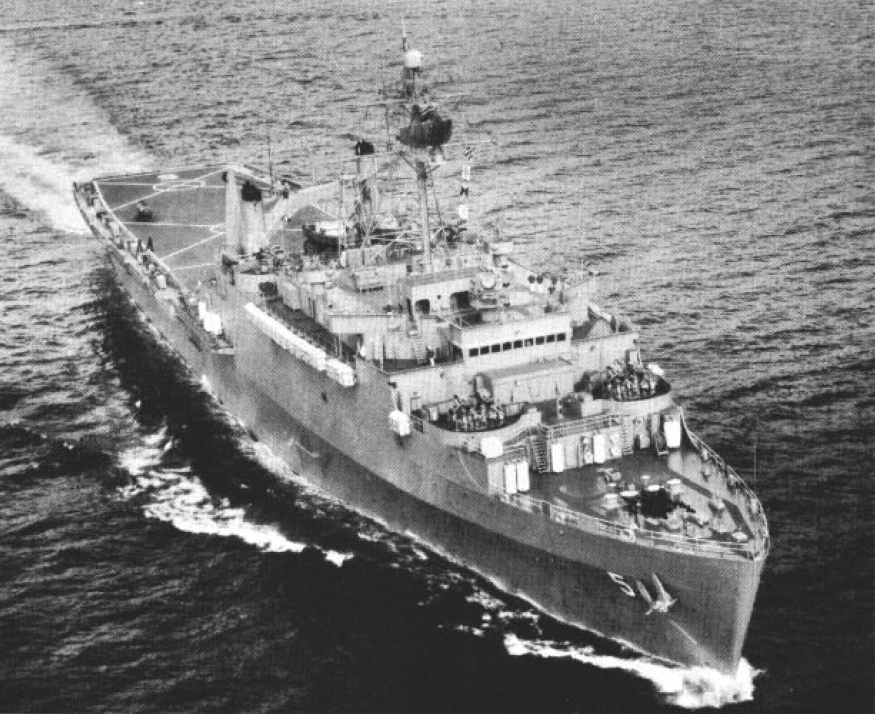
Ogden in 1965.

After training off Norfolk, Virginia, Ogden arrived at San Diego, California, on 29 October 1965 to join the United States Pacific Fleet and complete her initial training. In her first year of service the ship deployed twice to South Vietnam (8 February through 4 April 1966 and 16 May through 7 July 1966), bringing Marines and their equipment to the Vietnam War. On her return passages, she brought damaged vehicles home for repair. During the summer of 1966, she conducted experiments with aircraft capable of vertical or short landing and take-off. Ogden participated in Operation End Sweep in Haiphong Harbor as a member of Task Force 78 from January 1973 through July 1973, clearing mines with RH-53A helicopters.

During this operation, at least 23 crewman refused to obey orders and demanded to see the captain. Ten of them were convinced to return to duty. The remainder were court-martialed in The Philippines. They were sentenced to loss of rank and up to 75 days hard labor.

In the summer of 1977, Ogden stood off Camp Pendleton Marine Corps Base and acted as the base vessel for the U.S. Army's 2nd Battalion 39th Infantry Regiment of the 1st Brigade of the 9th Infantry Division as it was undergoing amphibious warfare training. After this was completed Ogden embarked this unit and transported it back to Fort Lewis, Washington.

==== 1989 Exxon Valdez oil spill Oil Spill Task Force 2 ====
As a part of the Oil Spill Task Force 2 created after the 1989 Exxon Valdez oil spill, Ogden supported over 400 civilians with beds, food, operational command for the task force helicopters. She was relieved by USS Duluth after two months.

=== Western Pacific ===
Ogden had turned sailors and Marines into Golden Shellbacks on at least five occasions. On 10 November 1976, 24 June 1985, 1988, 1992, and again in November 1999, Ogden crossed the Equator and the International Dateline simultaneously. During the 2001 crossing, Ogden hosted Alpha Company 1st Battalion, 4th Marines of the 13th Marine Expeditionary Unit.

Ogden was damaged when she collided with the submarine USS Greeneville on 27 February 2002, which opened a 5-by-18-inch (130 by 460 mm) hole in one of her fuel tanks.

=== Middle East ===
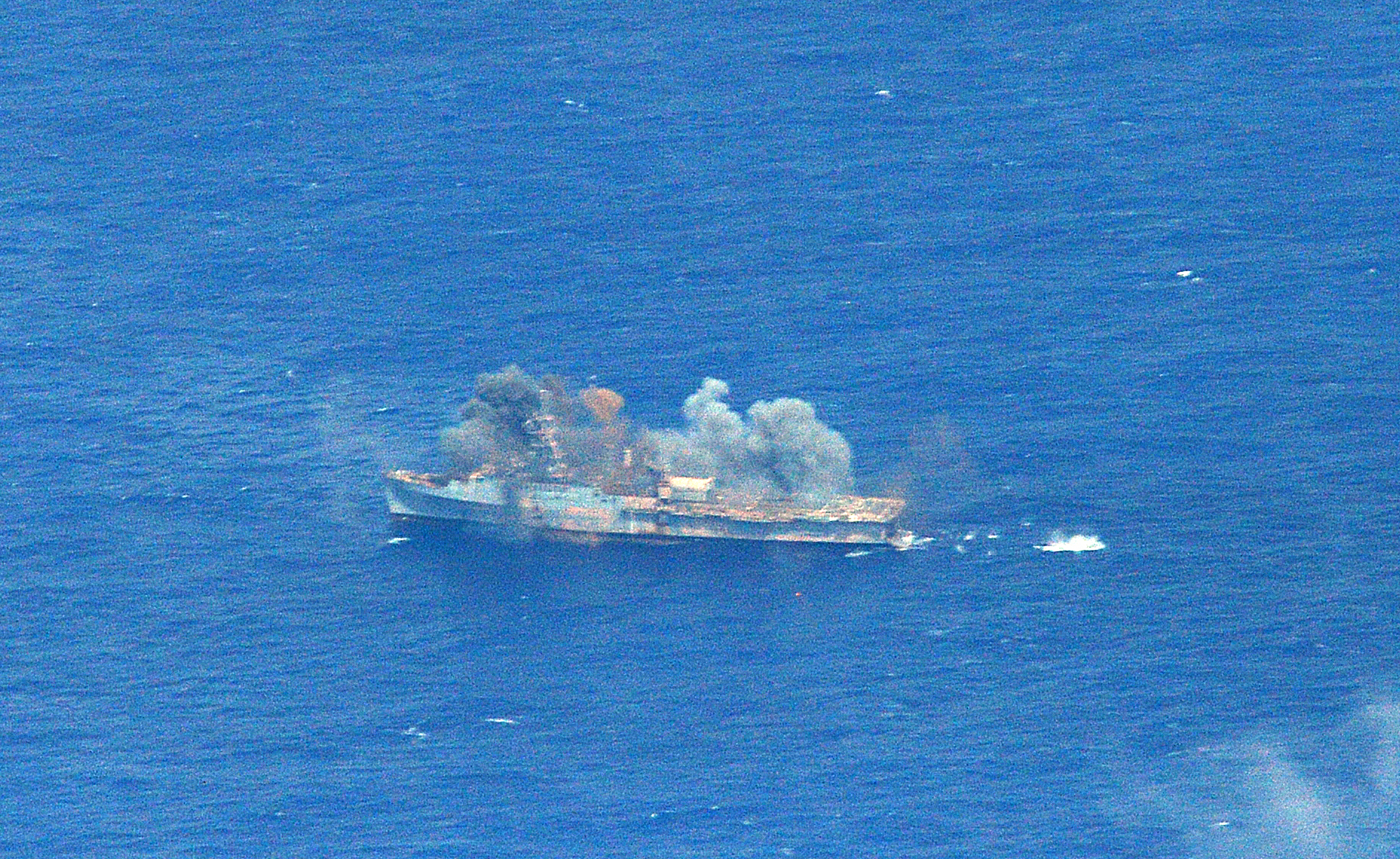
Ogden being sunk in July 2014

She was commissioned as part of the United States Third Fleet. She deployed in early 2006 with the 11th Marine Expeditionary Unit as part of a battle group. They were the first amphibious fleet to be sent to the Persian Gulf during Operation Desert Shield. During this time she was mostly used for intercepting blockade running freighters and tankers.

During Operation Desert Storm, Ogden was part of the task force sent to capture Failaka Island. The island was captured with very little resistance and Ogden transferred the prisoners to Saudi Arabia, making the largest transfer of prisoners on a ship ever.

The ship was originally scheduled for decommissioning in 2000, but with the requirements of the Operation Iraqi Freedom it was rescheduled.

On 16 February 2007, Ogden was awarded the 2006 Battle "E" award.

After a ceremony held aboard the ship in port at Naval Base San Diego, Ogden was decommissioned from the United States Navy on 21 February 2007.

== Fate ==
On 10 July 2014 during the naval exercise RIMPAC 2014, she was used as a missile target and sank 55 miles (89 km) northwest of Hawaii after being hit by a Naval Strike Missile launched by the Royal Norwegian Navy frigate HNoMS Fridtjof Nansen.
