= HNoMS Otto Sverdrup =

Norwegian navy frigate

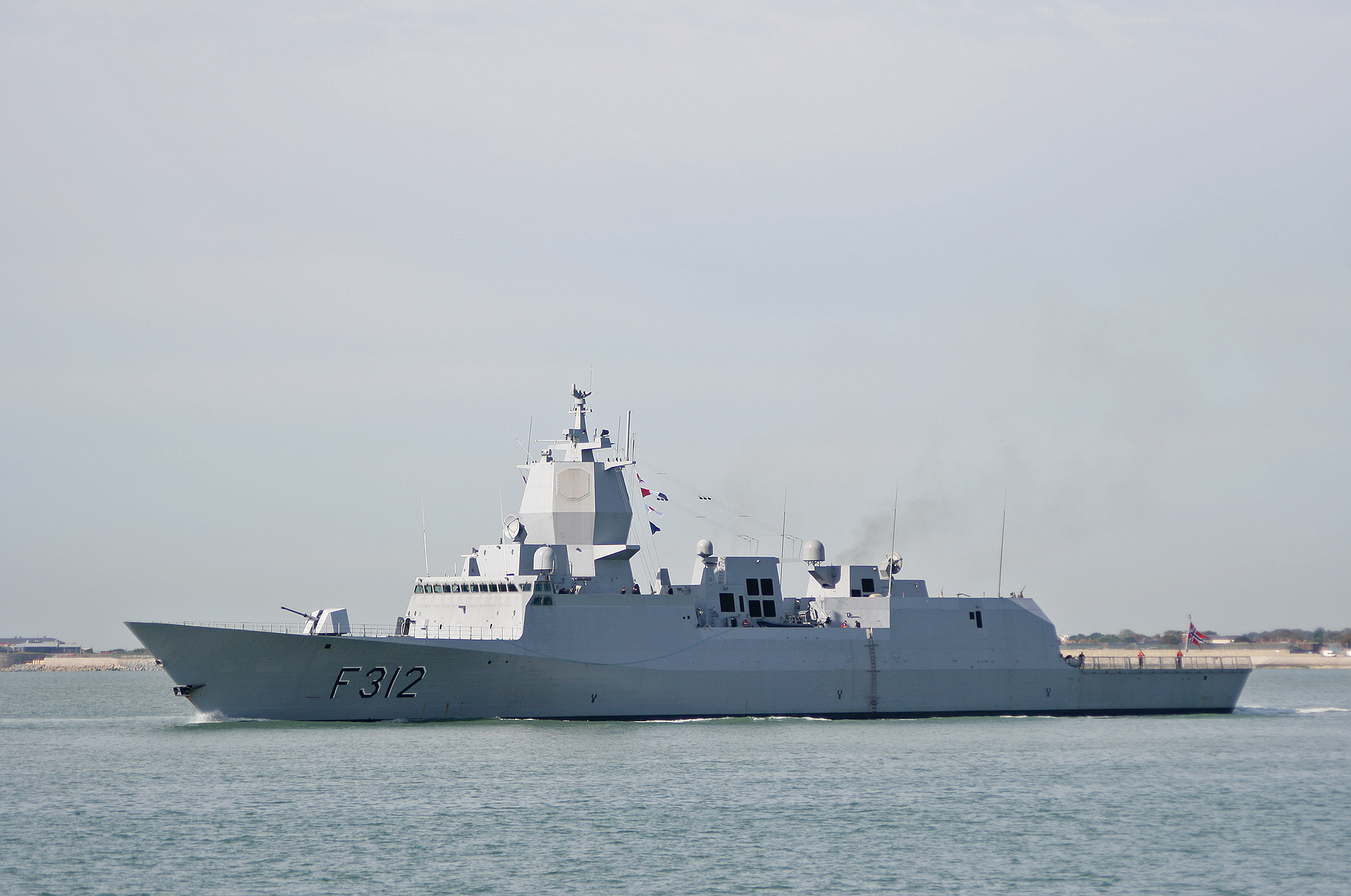
- Otto Sverdrup in 2009

History

Norway
- Name: Otto Sverdrup
- Namesake: Norwegian explorer Otto Sverdrup
- Ordered: 23 June 2000
- Builder: Navantia, Ferrol
- Laid down: 25 May 2005
- Launched: 28 April 2006
- Commissioned: 30 April 2008
- Identification: Pennant number: F312; MMSI number: 259043000; Callsign: LABS
- Status: Active
- Badge

General characteristics
- Class & type: Fridtjof Nansen-class frigate
- Displacement: 5,290 tons
- Length: 134 m (439.63 ft)
- Beam: 16.8 m (55.12 ft)
- Draft: 7.6 m (24.93 ft)
- Propulsion: Combined diesel and gas (CODAG); Two BAZAN BRAVO 12V 4.5 MW diesel engines for cruising; One GE LM2500 21.5 MW gas turbine for high speed running; MAAG gearboxes; two shafts driving controllable pitch propellers; Bow Thruster Retractable (Electric)1 MW Brunvoll; Diesel Generators 4 × MTU 396 Serie 12V 1250 KVA
- Speed: 27 knots (50.00 km/h)
- Range: 4,500 nautical miles (8,334.00 km)
- Complement: 120 men, accommodations for 146; Lockheed Martin AN/SPY-1F 3-D multifunction radar; Reutech RSR 210N air/sea surveillance radar; Sagem Vigy 20 Electro Optical Director; MRS 2000 hull mounted sonar; Captas MK II V1 active/passive towed sonar; 2 × Mark 82 fire-control radar
- Electronic warfare & decoys: Terma DL-12T decoy launcher, Loki torpedo countermeasure
- Armament: 8-cell Mk41 VLS for 32 × RIM-162 ESSM; 8 × Naval Strike Missile SSMs; 4 × torpedo tubes for Sting Ray torpedoes; Depth charges; 1 × 76 mm OTO Melara Super Rapid gun; 4 × 12,7 mm Browning M2HB HMG; 4 × Protector (RWS) ( Sea PROTECTOR ); 2 × LRAD Long Range Acoustic Device; Prepared for, but not equipped with: 1 × Otobreda 127 mm/54 gun to replace the 76 mm; 1 × spare 76mm OTO Melara Super Rapid gun; 1 × spare CIWS gun w/ calibre 40 mm or less; 3 × spare 8- cell Mk41 VLS launchers; Low cost ASW; ECM: Active Off-board Decoy
- Aircraft carried: 1 × NH90 helicopter

HNoMS Otto Sverdrup is a Fridtjof Nansen-class frigate of the Royal Norwegian Navy.

== Construction and commissioning ==
Built by the Spanish shipbuilders Navantia, in Ferrol, Otto Sverdrup was the third of the Fridtjof Nansen class to be launched and then commissioned into the Royal Norwegian Navy.

== Service ==
In November 2017 Otto Sverdrup visited London's West India Dock with the Portuguese frigate Francisco de Almeida. Both ships were part of Standing NATO Maritime Group 1 at the time.
