= HNoMS Thor Heyerdahl =

Norwegian naval frigate

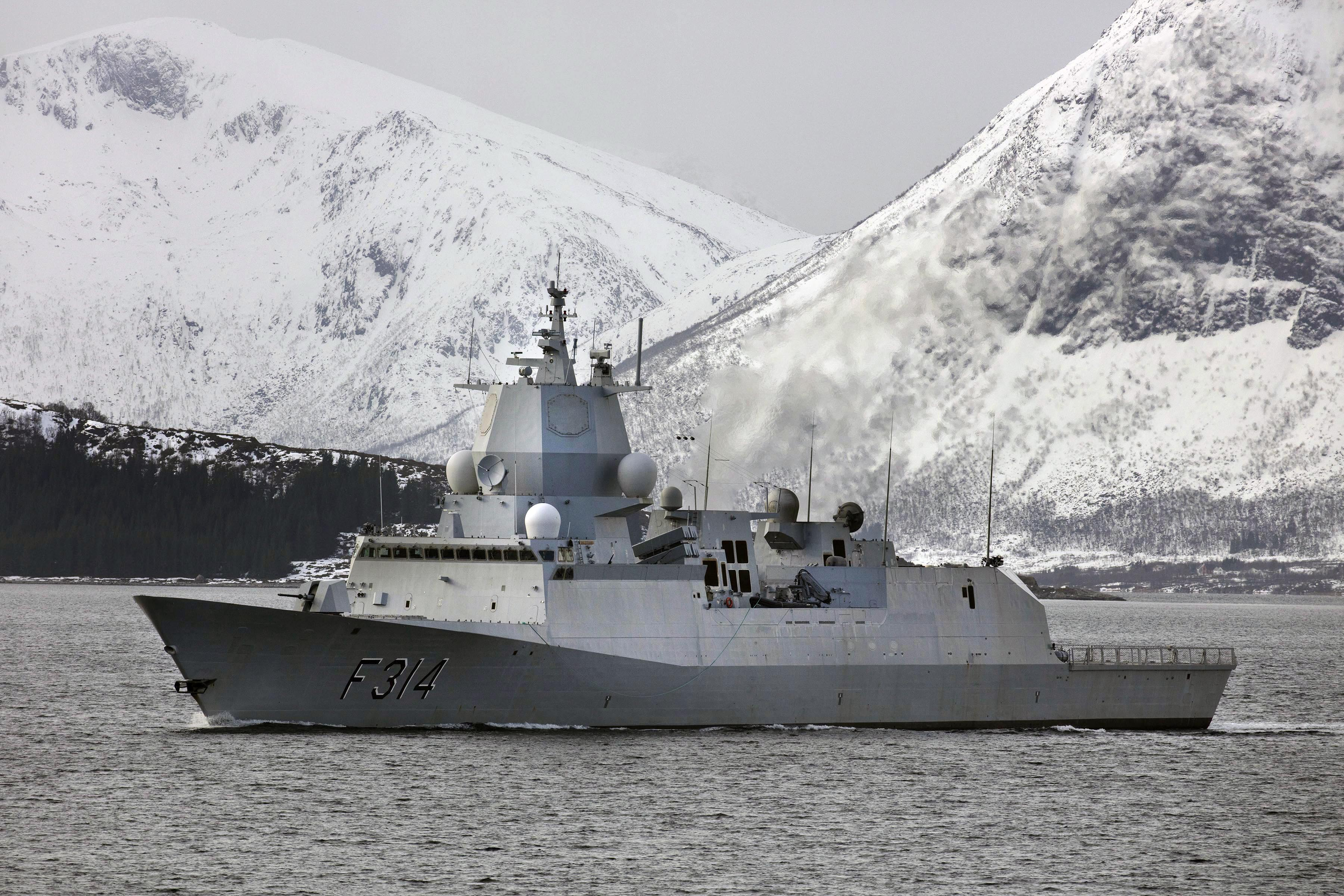
- Exercising with HMS Lancaster in March 2021

History

Norway
- Name: Thor Heyerdahl
- Namesake: Norwegian explorer Thor Heyerdahl
- Ordered: 23 June 2000
- Builder: Navantia, Ferrol
- Laid down: 23 November 2007
- Launched: 11 February 2009
- Commissioned: 18 February 2011
- Identification: Pennant number: F314; MMSI number: 259045000; Callsign: LABH
- Status: Active
- Badge

General characteristics
- Class & type: Fridtjof Nansen-class frigate
- Displacement: 5,290 tons
- Length: 134 m (439.63 ft)
- Beam: 16.8 m (55.12 ft)
- Draft: 7.6 m (24.93 ft)
- Propulsion: Combined diesel and gas (CODAG); Two BAZAN BRAVO 12V 4.5 MW diesel engines for cruising; One GE LM2500 21.5 MW gas turbine for high speed running; MAAG gearboxes; two shafts driving controllable pitch propellers; Bow Thruster Retractable (Electric)1 MW Brunvoll; Diesel Generators 4 × MTU 396 Serie 12V 1250 KVA
- Speed: 27 knots (50.00 km/h)
- Range: 4,500 nautical miles (8,334.00 km)
- Complement: 120 men, accommodations for 146; Lockheed Martin AN/SPY-1F 3-D multifunction radar; Reutech RSR 210N air/sea surveillance radar; Sagem Vigy 20 Electro Optical Director; MRS 2000 hull mounted sonar; Captas MK II V1 active/passive towed sonar; 2 × Mark 82 fire-control radar
- Electronic warfare & decoys: Terma DL-12T decoy launcher, Loki torpedo countermeasure
- Armament: 2 x 8-cell Mk41 VLS for 64 × RIM-162 ESSM; 8 × Naval Strike Missile SSMs; 4 × torpedo tubes for Sting Ray torpedoes; Depth charges; 1 × 76 mm OTO Melara Super Rapid gun; 4 × 12,7 mm Browning M2HB HMG; 4 × Protector (RWS) ( Sea PROTECTOR ); 2 × LRAD Long Range Acoustic Device; Prepared for, but not equipped with: 1 × Otobreda 127 mm/54 gun to replace the 76 mm; 1 × spare 76mm OTO Melara Super Rapid gun; 1 × spare CIWS gun w/ calibre 40 mm or less; 3 × spare 8- cell Mk41 VLS launchers; Low cost ASW; ECM: Active Off-board Decoy
- Aircraft carried: 1 × NH90 helicopter

HNoMS Thor Heyerdahl is a Fridtjof Nansen-class frigate of the Royal Norwegian Navy.

== Construction and commissioning ==
Built by the Spanish shipbuilders Navantia, in Ferrol, Thor Heyerdahl was the fifth and last of the Fridtjof Nansen class to be launched and then commissioned into the Royal Norwegian Navy. Unlike the other members of her class, she was built with two 8-cell VLS modules instead of one.
