= Fridtjof Nansen-class frigate =

Class of ships of the Royal Norwegian Navy

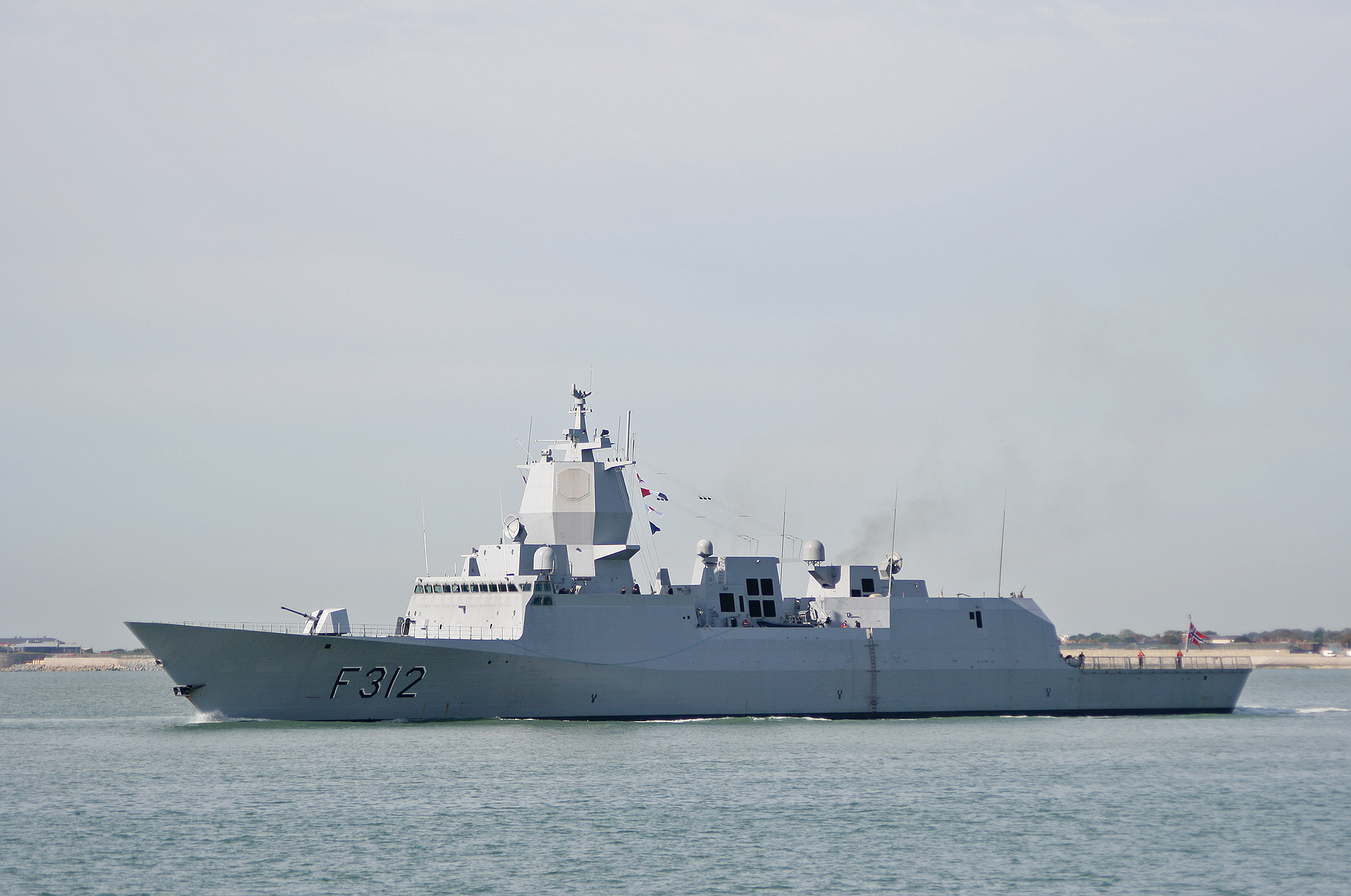
- HNoMS Otto Sverdrup

Class overview
- Name: Fridtjof Nansen class
- Builders: Navantia, Ferrol, Spain
- Operators: Royal Norwegian Navy
- Preceded by: Oslo class
- Succeeded by: Type 26 frigate
- Cost: NOK 21 billion (2003) for 5 units (est.); NOK 4.2 billion (2003) per unit (est.); USD 489 million per unit (est.)
- In commission: 2006-present
- Completed: 5
- Active: 4
- Lost: 1 (Helge Ingstad)
- Retired: 1 (Helge Ingstad)

General characteristics
- Type: Multi-role frigate
- Displacement: 5,290 tons full load
- Length: 134 m (439 ft 8 in)
- Beam: 16.8 m (55 ft 1 in)
- Draft: 7.6 m (24 ft 11 in)
- Propulsion: Combined diesel and gas turbine (CODAG); Two BAZAN BRAVO 12V 4.5 MW diesel engines for cruising; One GE LM2500 21.5 MW gas turbine for high speed running; MAAG gearboxes; Two shafts driving controllable pitch propellers; Bow Thruster Retractable (Electric) 1 MW Brunvoll; Diesel generators 4 × MTU 396 Serie 12V 1250 KVA
- Speed: 27 knots (50 km/h; 31 mph)+
- Range: 4.500 nmi (8.334 km; 5.179 mi) at 16 knots (30 km/h; 18 mph)
- Complement: 120, accommodations for 146
- Sensors & processing systems: Lockheed Martin AN/SPY-1F 3D multifunction radar; Reutech RSR 210N air/sea surveillance radar; Sagem Vigy 20 Electro Optical Director; Kongsberg MSI 2005F ASW combat system; MRS 2000 hull mounted sonar; Captas MK II V1 active/passive towed array sonar; 2 × Mark 82 AN/SPG-62 fire-control radar
- Electronic warfare & decoys: Condor CS-3701 ECM:/ESM: suite; Terma DL-12T decoy launcher; Loki torpedo countermeasure
- Armament: 1 or 2 × 8-cell Mk 41 VLS (32 × RIM-162 ESSM); 8 × Naval Strike Missile SSMs; 4 × torpedo tubes for Sting Ray torpedoes; Depth charges; 1 × 76 mm OTO Melara Super Rapid gun; 3 × 12.7 mm Browning M2HB machine gun in Sea Protector mounts; 2 × 7.62mm MG 3 machine gun; Capabilities for other weapons (Note: The class is prepared for, but not equipped with: * 1 × Otobreda 127 mm/54 gun to replace the 76 mm * 1 × spare 76mm OTO Melara Super Rapid gun * 1 × spare CIWS gun of 40 mm calibre or less * 1 × spare 8-cell Mk 41 VLS launchers * Low cost ASROC * ECM: Active Off-board Decoy * 3 × Protector (RWS) (Sea Protector)); 2 × LRAD Long Range Acoustic Device
- Aircraft carried: 1 × medium-sized ASW helicopter

The Fridtjof Nansen-class frigates are a class of frigates that are the main surface combatant units of the Royal Norwegian Navy. The ships are named after famous Norwegian explorers, with the lead ship of the class bearing the name of Fridtjof Nansen. Five ships were ordered from Spanish shipbuilder Bazan (now Navantia).

The total projected cost for all five ships in 2009 was 21 billion kr (about US$2.44 billion). As of November 2018, four are in active service and one was scrapped following a severe collision that led to its sinking.

== Design ==
The frigates were originally intended as a replacement for the aging Oslo-class frigates, with a primary focus on anti-submarine warfare (ASW). Eventually, the need for a robust anti-aircraft defense as well as the possibility of incorporating the Naval Strike Missile surface-to-surface missile produced by Norwegian company Kongsberg Defence & Aerospace led to a more multi-role design. The selection of Navantia as prime contractor led to the design being very similar to the Spanish Navy's Álvaro de Bazán-class frigates, including the incorporation of Lockheed Martin's AEGIS combat system.

== Improvements ==
The Fridtjof Nansen-class frigates are larger, and have more personnel and equipment than the Oslo-class frigates. Compared to the Oslo-class vessels, the new vessels are 35 meters longer, nine meters taller and two meters deeper below water. They are also five meters broader and have three times the water displacement of the old ships. The frigates operated six NFH NH90 helicopters, with the role as an extended "arm" of the frigates' anti-submarine and anti-surface capabilities but these will be taken out of services (2022) and returned to NH Industries. In 2023, Norway announced the acquisition of 6 MH-60R helicopters. While the helicopters would be prepared to be equipped for anti-submarine operations, they were initially to be deployed with the Norwegian Coast Guard. This meant that the replacement of helicopters specifically to operate off the Fridtjof Nansen-class remained outstanding.

The 2023 defence acquisitions plan indicated that the frigates would undergo technical upgrades beginning in 2025 in order to maintain their operational capabilities.

== Service history ==
On 26 February 2009, the Norwegian government decided to deploy Fridtjof Nansen to the Gulf of Aden, thereby participating in the ongoing Operation Atalanta, the European Union's counter-piracy campaign in Somalia. Fridtjof Nansen joined the campaign in August 2009.

Fridtjof Nansen's engagement in Operation Atalanta was carried out without a permanently stationed helicopter. Mainly due to delays in delivery of the new NH-90, the ship was equipped with two fast RHIBs for its onboard contingent of maritime special operations forces (Marinejegerkommandoen).

In November 2009 she became involved in a firefight with suspected pirates after being attacked while inspecting a fishing vessel.

In December 2013 HNoMS Helge Ingstad and the Danish Absalon-class support ship HDMS Esbern Snare were sent to the Syrian port of Latakia to escort the Norwegian registered RoRo cargo ship Taiko and the Danish cargo ship Ark Futura, which transported Syrian chemical weapons to Italy where they were handed over to a United States Navy ship for destruction in international waters.

On 8 November 2018, while returning from participation in Exercise Trident Juncture, Helge Ingstad was involved in a collision with a Maltese-registered oil tanker, Sola TS, that severely damaged the frigate and caused a severe list that placed it in serious danger of sinking in spite of its position. The frigate first ran aground and then was successfully beached and tethered with wire cable to prevent it sinking and allow the crew to be evacuated. In the early hours of 13 November the vessel partially sank with only smaller sections of the superstructure remaining above water. The vessel was recovered but with the cost of repair prohibitive it was decommissioned and scrapped.

== Ships in class ==
The ships are named after explorers Fridtjof Nansen, Roald Amundsen, Otto Sverdrup, Helge Ingstad and Thor Heyerdahl.

Pennant number	Name	Ordered	Laid down	Launched	Commissioned	Decommissioned	Status
F310	Fridtjof Nansen	23 June 2000	9 April 2003	3 June 2004	5 April 2006		Active
F311	Roald Amundsen	23 June 2000	3 June 2004	25 May 2005	21 May 2007		Active
F312	Otto Sverdrup	23 June 2000	25 May 2005	28 April 2006	30 April 2008		Active
F313	Helge Ingstad	23 June 2000	28 April 2006	23 November 2007	29 September 2009	24 June 2019	Scrapped, January 2021
F314	Thor Heyerdahl	23 June 2000	23 November 2007	11 February 2009	18 January 2011		Active

== Future replacement ==
In June 2023, the Norwegian Ministry of Defence published The Military Advice of the Chief of Defence 2023, in which General Eirik Kristoffersen (Chief of Defence) recommended that Norway replace the RNoN's in-service Fridtjof Nansen-class frigates and increase the force level to six ships. Delivering a new frigate likely will be central to the government’s long-term plan to build a new surface force structure within a wider fleet renewal programme. The government likely will emphasize the need to deliver the future frigate through partnership with close allies.

In the New Norwegian Long Term Plan on Defence from April 2024, it is proposed to replace the class with five new frigates with the same focus (ASW) as the Fridtjof Nansen class.

In August 2025, after a competition between the F126, Constellation, and FDI designs, it was announced that the British Type 26 frigate would succeed the class, with deliveries beginning in 2030.

== Images ==
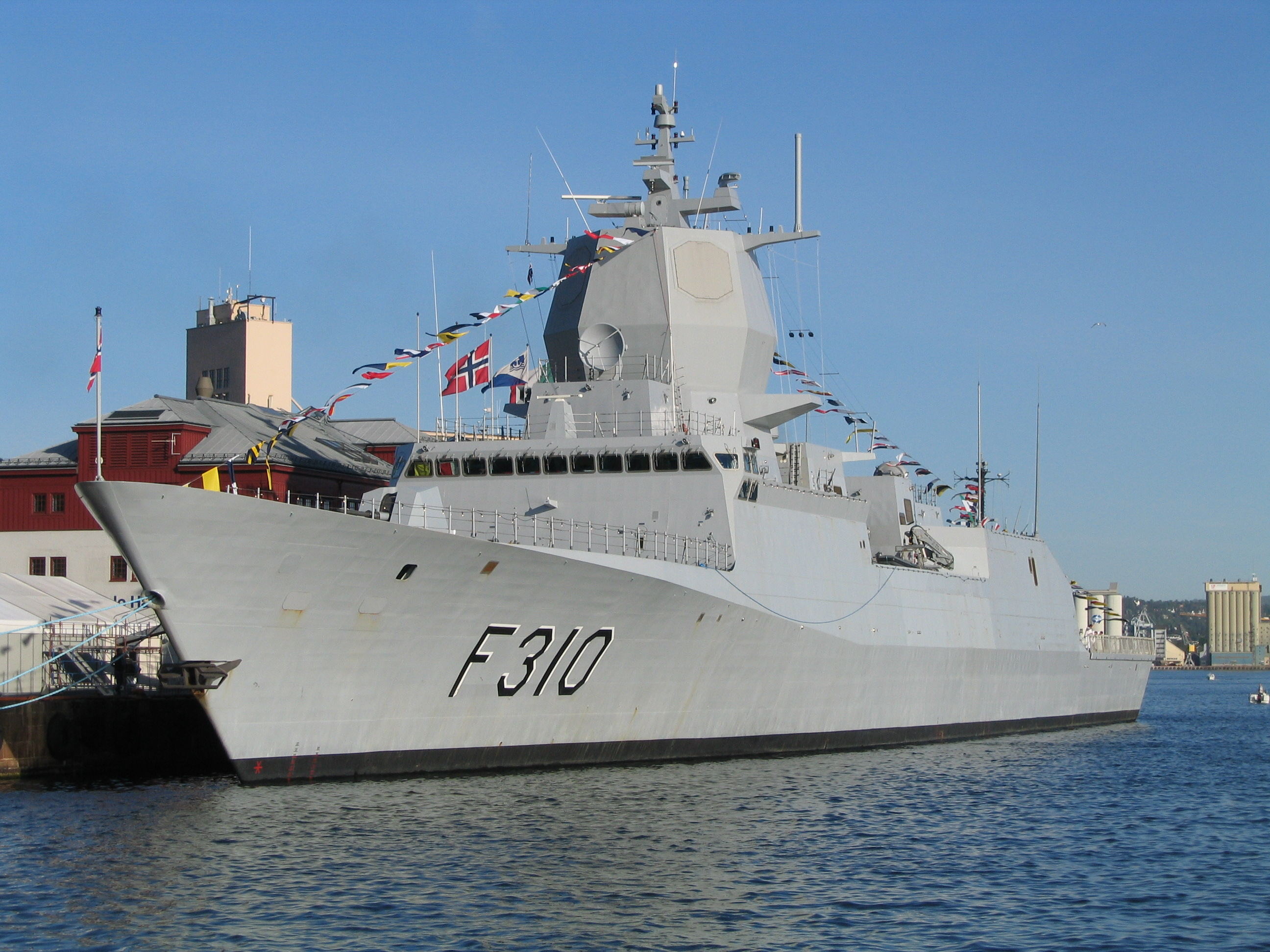
View of the lead ship of the class, Fridtjof Nansen

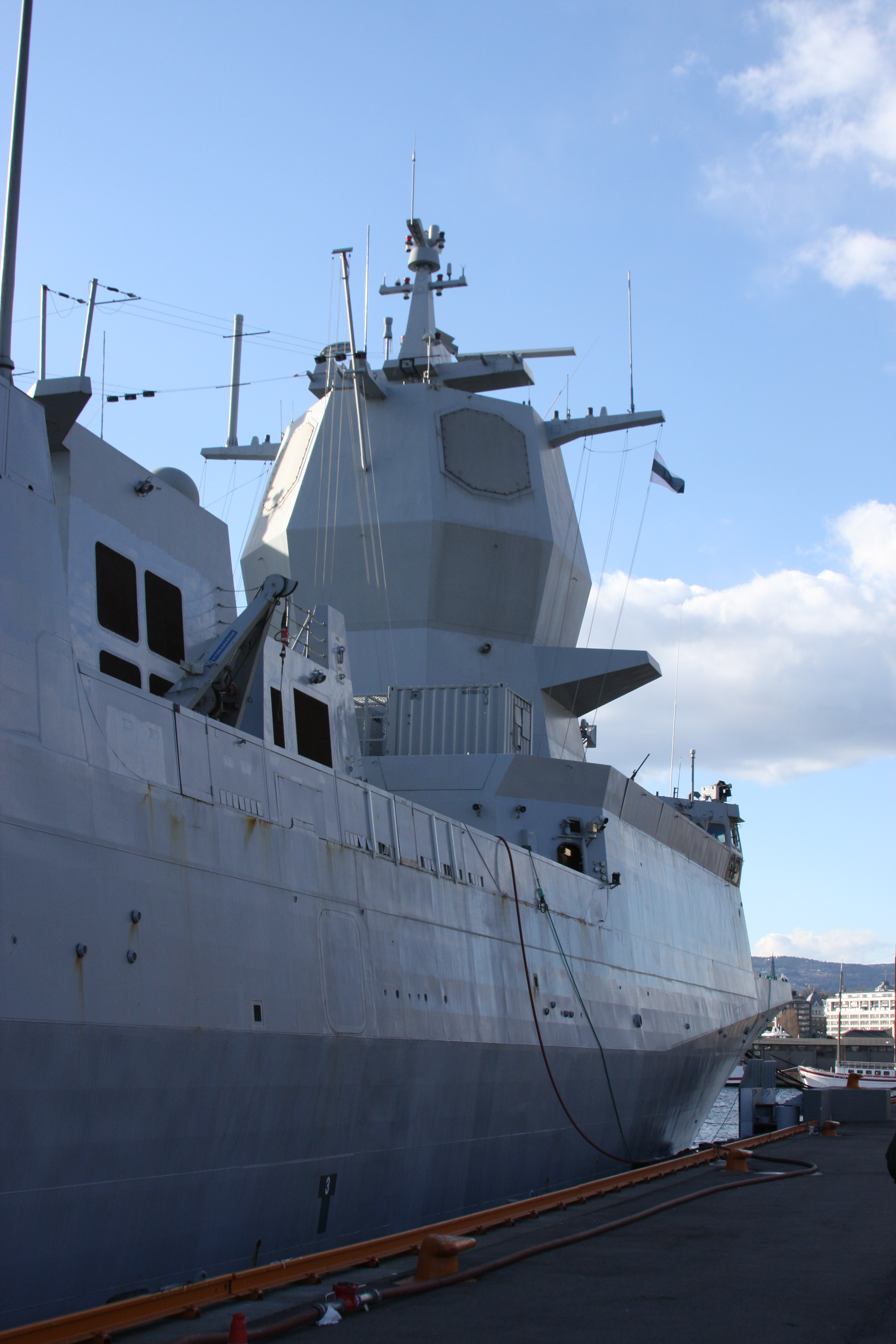
Close-up of superstructure of Fridtjof Nansen

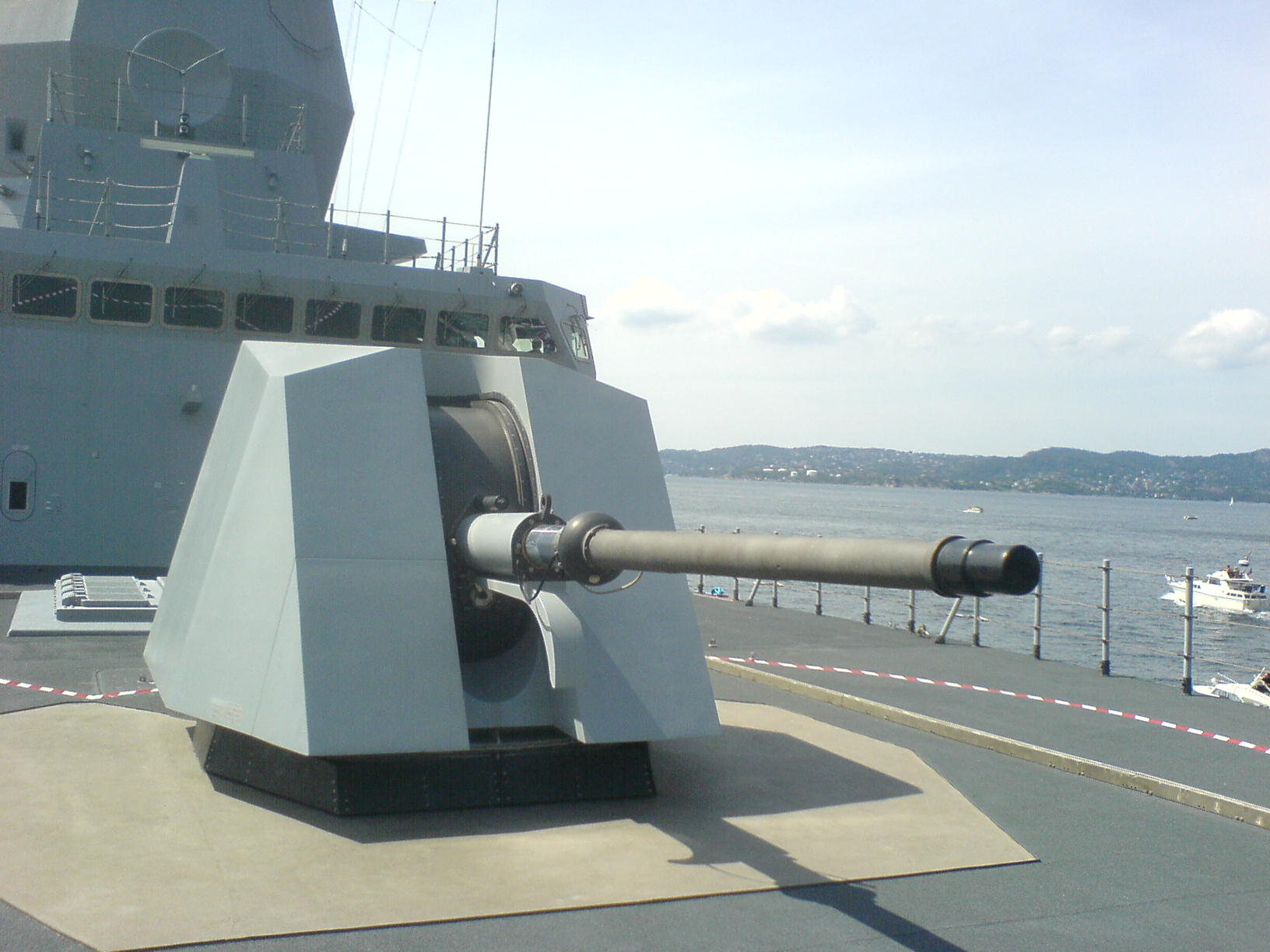
The OTO Breda 76 mm gun. Note the low-RCS design of both the gun house and the exposed part of the barbette.

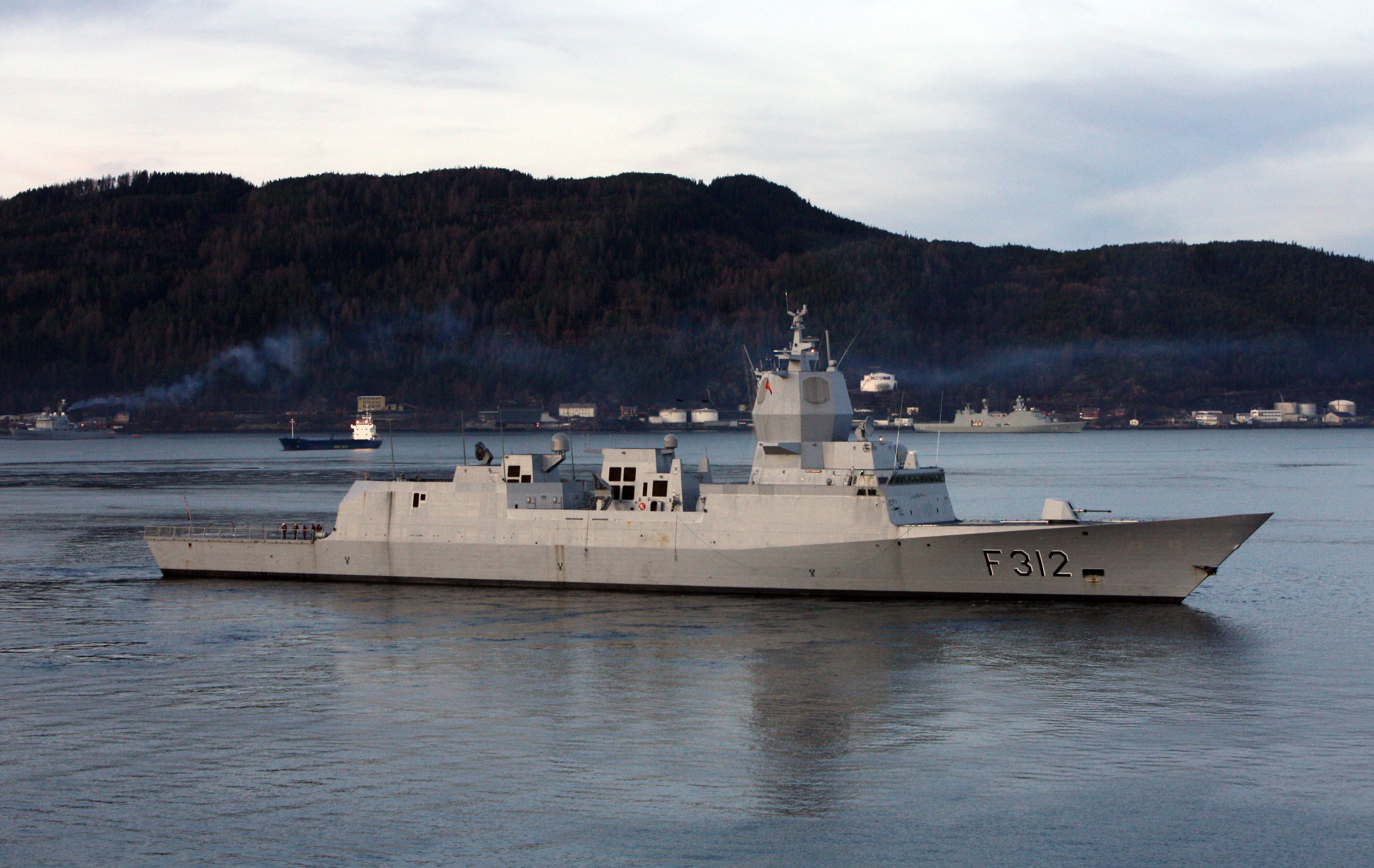
Otto Sverdrup leaving Trondheim, Norway, November 2009.

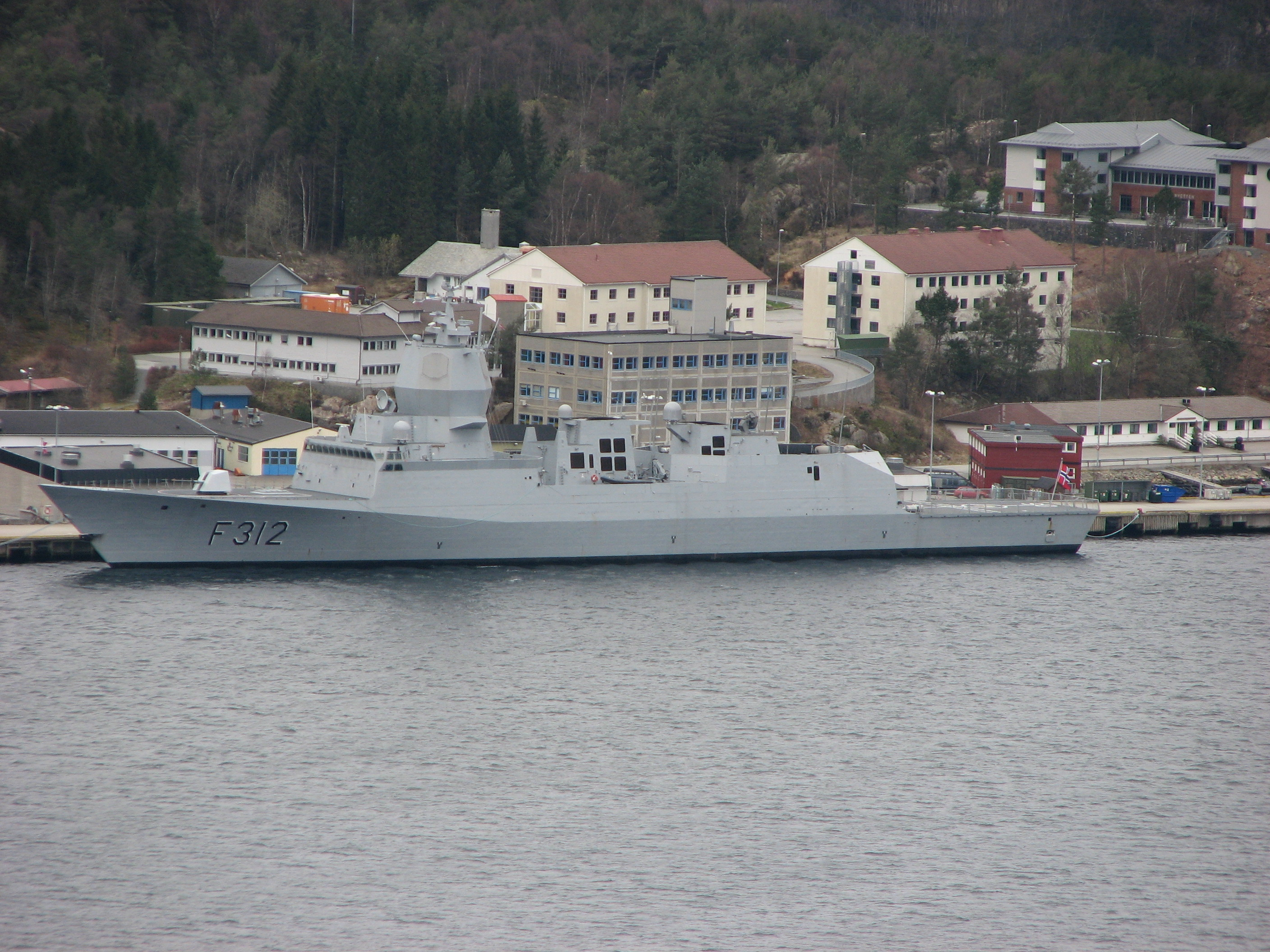
Otto Sverdrup at Haakonsvern Naval Base.

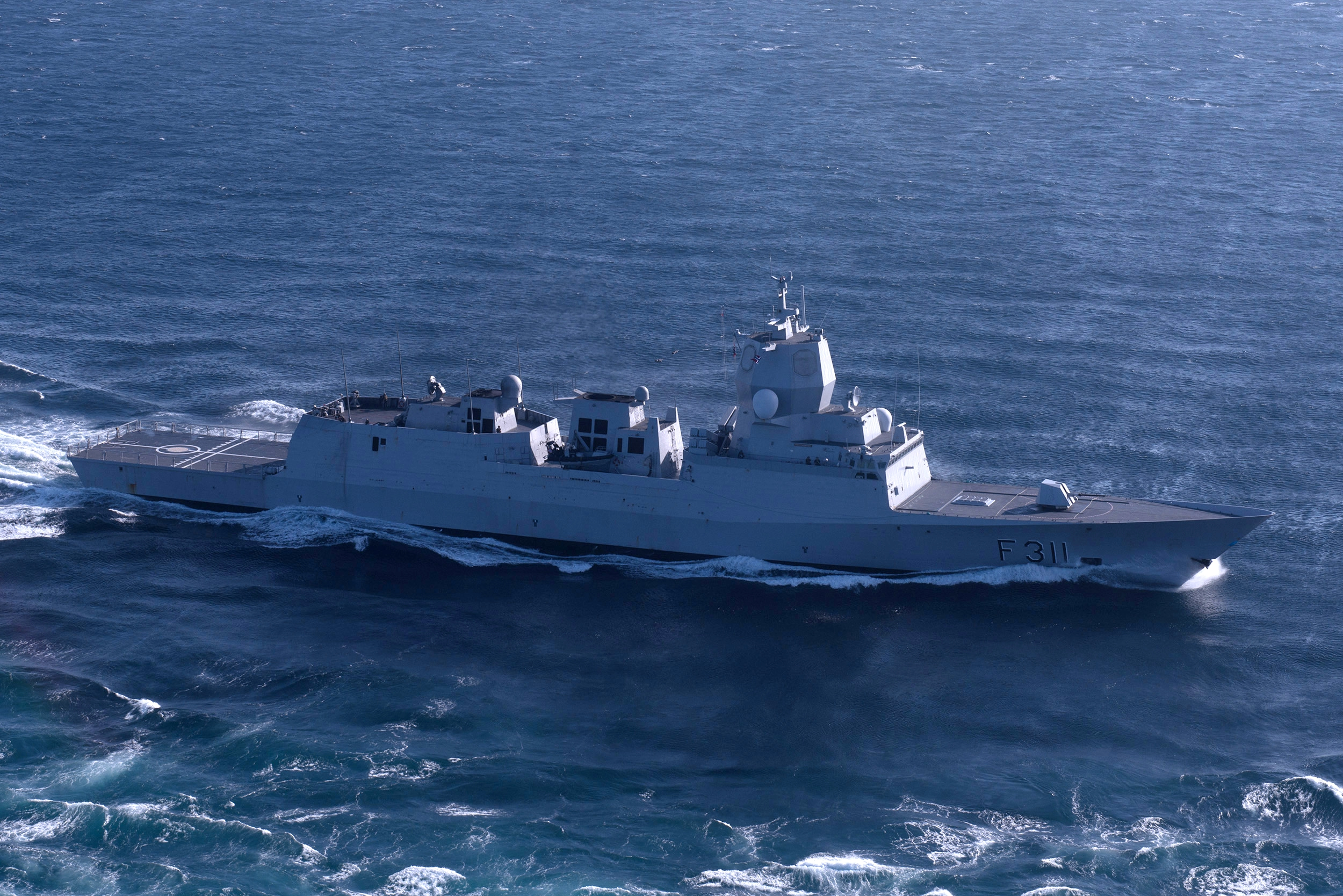
Roald Amundsen.

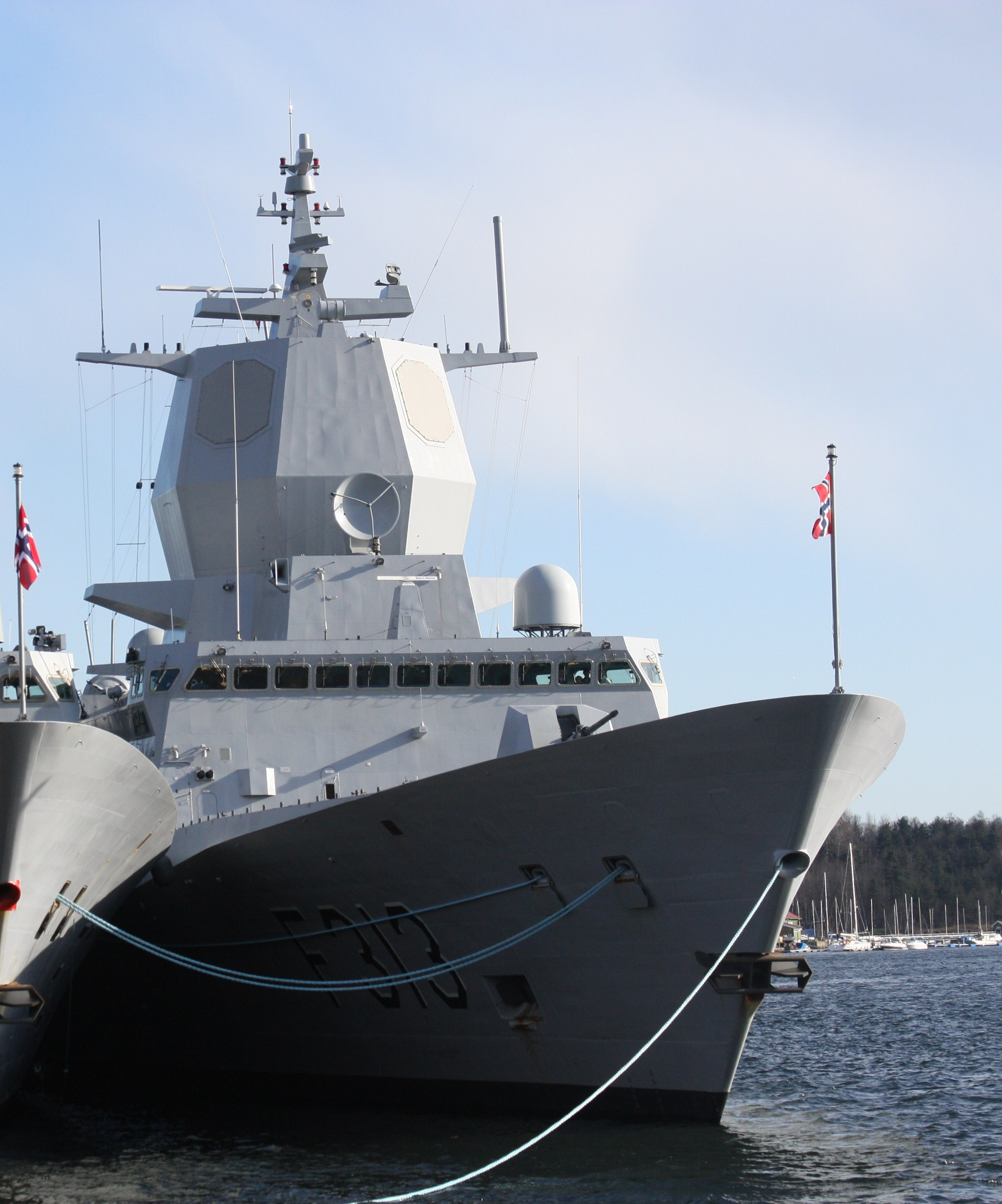
Helge Ingstad

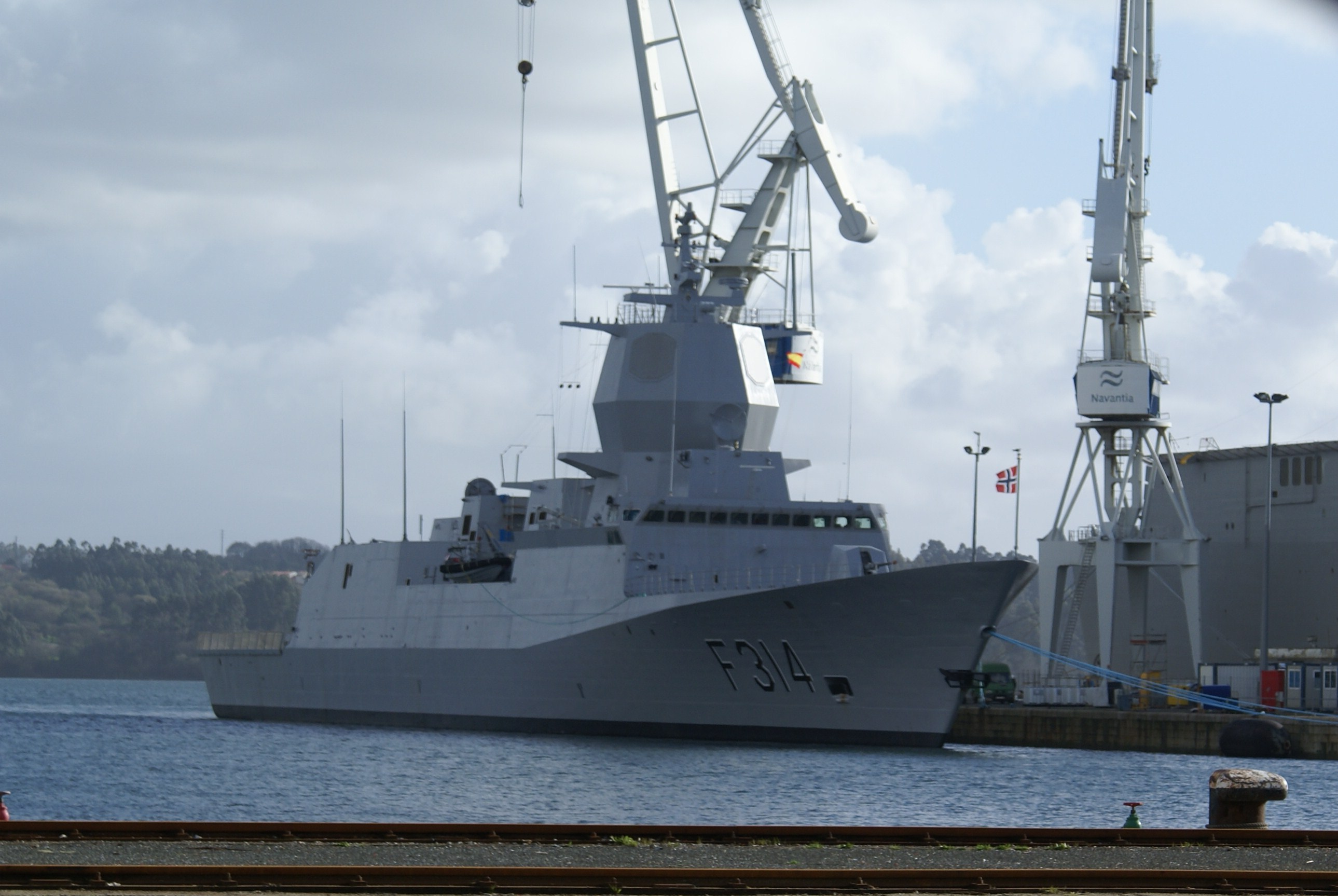
Thor Heyerdahl

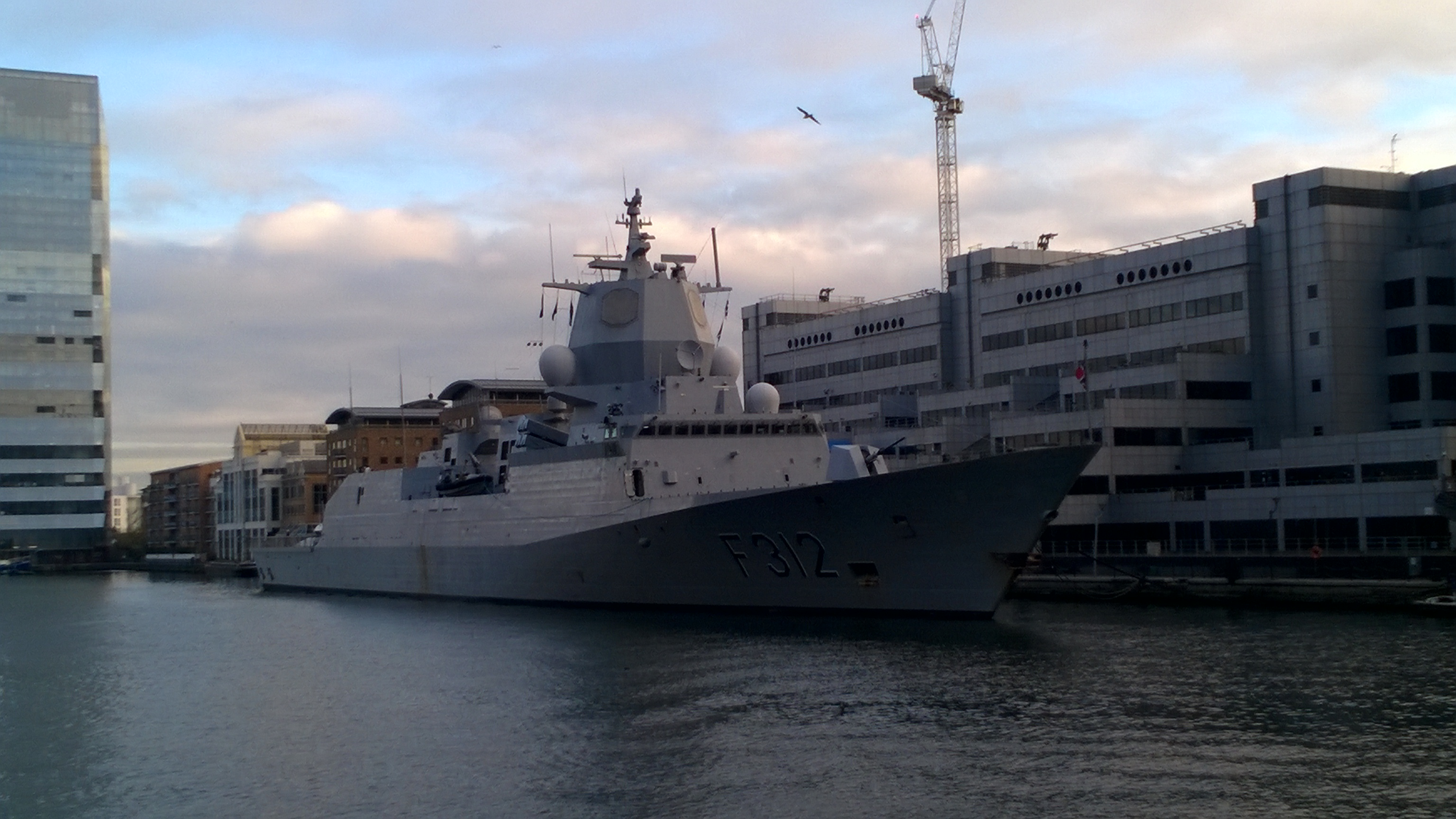
Otto Sverdrup moored at South Quay in London, December 2017

== See also ==
- List of active Royal Norwegian Navy ships
- List of frigate classes in service

=== Equivalent frigates of the same era ===
- Absalon class
- Valour class
- Project 11356R
- Incheon class
- Formidable class
- Type 054
