= HNoMS Fridtjof Nansen (F310) =

Norwegian frigate

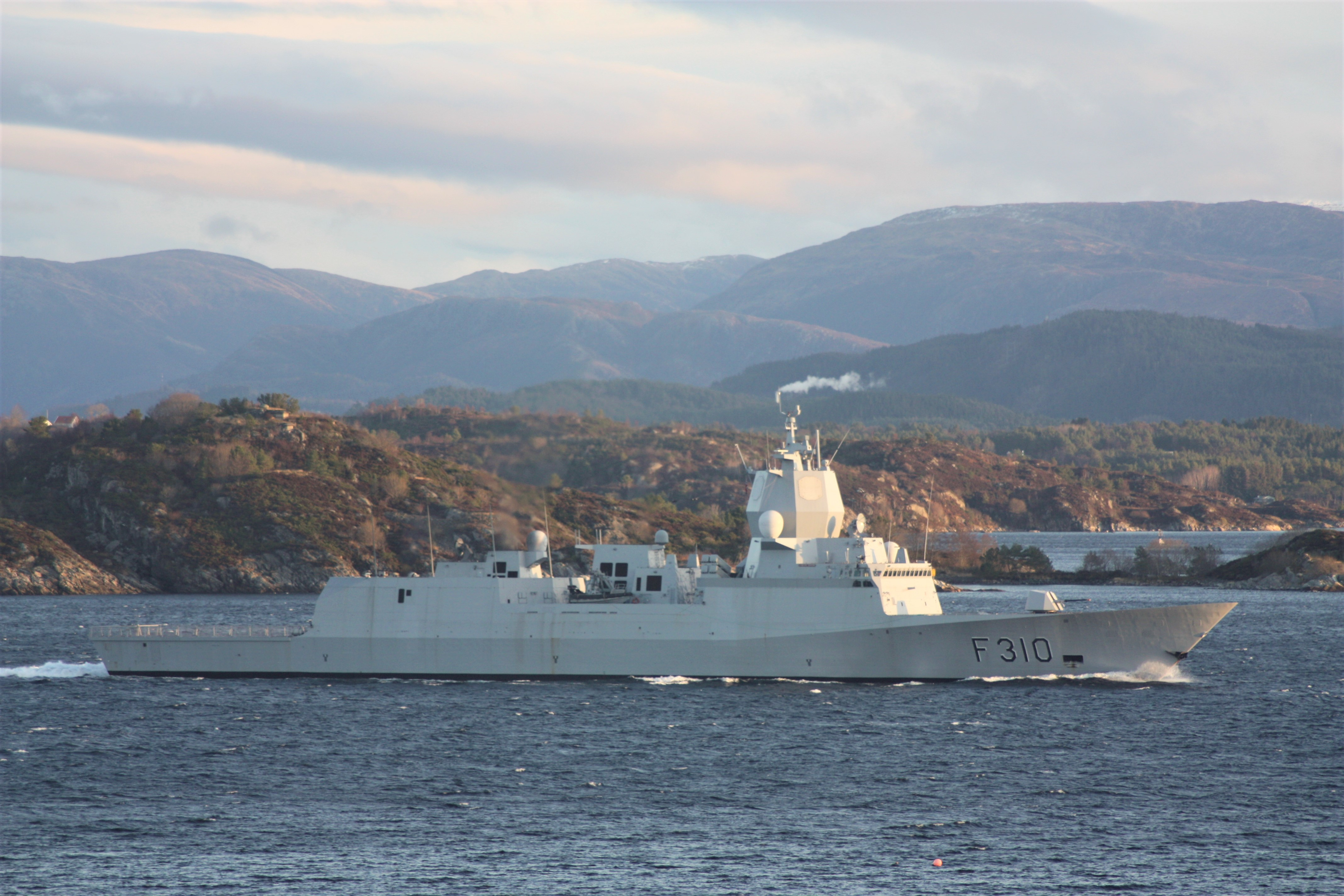
- Fridtjof Nansen in Korsfjorden

History

Norway
- Name: Fridtjof Nansen
- Namesake: Norwegian explorer Fridtjof Nansen
- Builder: Navantia, Ferrol, Spain
- Yard number: F310
- Laid down: 9 April 2003
- Launched: 3 June 2004
- Commissioned: 5 April 2006
- Identification: MMSI number: 259041000; Callsign: LABN
- Status: Active
- Badge

General characteristics
- Class & type: Fridtjof Nansen-class frigate
- Displacement: 5,290 tons
- Length: 134 m (439.63 ft)
- Beam: 16.8 m (55.12 ft)
- Draft: 7.6 m (24.93 ft)
- Propulsion: Combined diesel and gas (CODAG); Two BAZAN BRAVO 12V 4.5 MW diesel engines for cruising; One GE LM2500 21.5 MW gas turbine for high speed running; MAAG gearboxes; two shafts driving controllable pitch propellers; Bow Thruster Retractable (Electric)1 MW Brunvoll; Diesel Generators 4 × MTU 396 Serie 12V 1250 KVA
- Speed: 27 knots (50.00 km/h)
- Range: 4,500 nautical miles (8,334.00 km)
- Complement: 120, accommodations for 146; Lockheed Martin AN/SPY-1F 3-D multifunction radar; Reutech RSR 210N air/sea surveillance radar; Sagem Vigy 20 Electro Optical Director; MRS 2000 hull mounted sonar; Captas MK II V1 active/passive towed sonar; 2 × Mark 82 fire-control radar
- Electronic warfare & decoys: Terma DL-12T decoy launcher, Loki torpedo countermeasure
- Armament: 8-cell Mk41 VLS for 32 × RIM-162 ESSM; 8 × Naval Strike Missile SSMs; 4 × torpedo tubes for Sting Ray torpedoes; Depth charges; 1 × 76 mm OTO Melara Super Rapid gun; 4 × 12,7 mm Browning M2HB HMG; 4 × Protector (RWS) ( Sea PROTECTOR ); 2 × LRAD Long Range Acoustic Device; Prepared for, but not equipped with: 1 × Otobreda 127 mm/54 gun to replace the 76 mm; 1 × spare 76mm OTO Melara Super Rapid gun; 1 × spare CIWS gun w/ calibre 40 mm or less; 3 × spare 8- cell Mk41 VLS launchers; Low cost ASW; ECM: Active Off-board Decoy
- Aircraft carried: 1 × NH90 helicopter

HNoMS Fridtjof Nansen is a frigate of the Royal Norwegian Navy. Commissioned on 5 April 2006, she is the lead ship of the Fridtjof Nansen class of warships.

== Counter-piracy ==
On 26 February 2009, the Norwegian government decided to deploy HNoMS Fridtjof Nansen to the Gulf of Aden, thereby participating in the ongoing Operation Atalanta, the European Union's counter-piracy campaign in Somalia. Fridtjof Nansen joined the campaign in August 2009.

Fridtjof Nansen's engagement in Operation Atalanta was carried out without a permanently stationed helicopter. Mainly due to delays in delivery of the new NH-90, the ship is equipped with two ultra-fast RHIBs as a replacement. In November 2009 she became involved in a fire-fight with suspected pirates after being attacked while inspecting a fishing vessel.

== RIMPAC 2014 ==
In 2014, Fridtjof Nansen took part in the naval exercise RIMPAC 2014 in the Pacific Ocean. During the exercise, she used a Naval Strike Missile to sink the USS Ogden (LPD-5), a decommissioned U.S. Navy amphibious transport dock, as a target 55 nautical miles northwest of Hawaii on 10 July 2014.

== Carrier Strike Group 8 ==
From September 2021 to May 2022, Fridtjof Nansen was fully integrated with the US Navy's Carrier Strike Group 8 (CSG-8) as part of the USN's Cooperative Deployment Program. The Nansen arrived at Naval Station Norfolk, Virginia in September 2021 and underwent extensive training, testing and certification before deploying with the USS Harry S. Truman (CVN-75) and the rest of the strike group in December 2021. The strike group was originally planned to transit the Suez Canal in early February for a cruise through the Middle East and Persian Gulf regions, but in light of the tensions surrounding the ongoing standoff between Russia and Ukraine, they were ordered to remain in the Mediterranean until further notice. The Nansen served a full 6 month deployment with the group before returning to Norway in May 2022.

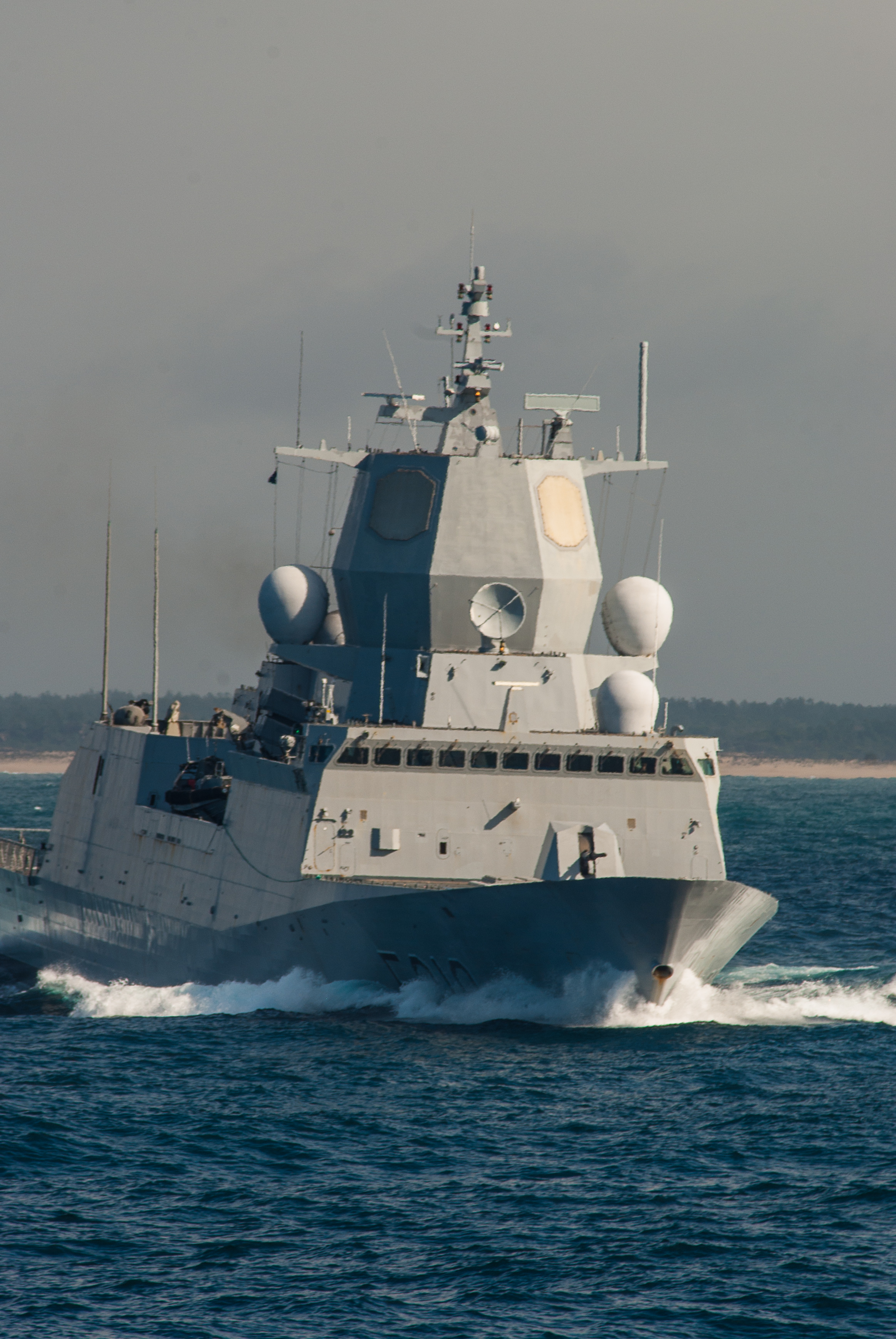
Fridtjof Nansen at the end of exercise Trident Juncture 2015
