= Battle of Failaka =

Part of the Iraqi invasion of Kuwait

- Part of the Gulf War
Date	3 August 1990
Location	Failaka Island, Kuwait 29°23′12.96″N 47°59′50.57″E
Result	Iraqi victory: Expulsion of Failaka's population to the mainland

Belligerents
Iraq	Kuwait

Commanders and leaders
(Ba'athist Iraq) Ra'ad al-Hamdani	(Kuwait) Saif Al-Anezi † (Kuwait) Ghazi Ahmed †

Units involved
Iraqi Special Forces Battalion; Marine Battalion; Helicopter Support	Infantry Company; Company of Border Guards

The Battle of Failaka broke out between the Kuwaiti garrison of Failaka Island and attacking Iraqi forces during the Iraqi Invasion of Kuwait, on 2 August 1990. The Kuwaiti garrison consisted of an infantry company and a company of border guards, in addition to air defense company armed with Hawk SAMs. Iraqi forces consisted of a special forces battalion transported by helicopters reinforced with a battalion of marines.

== Aftermath ==
After the successful takeover by the Iraqi army, the island of Failaka was depopulated, with its 2,000 residents expelled to the mainland. The island was retaken by US forces in 1991, using tools of psychological warfare, making the Iraqi contingent of 1,400 surrender without a single shot.

== See also ==
- The Battle of the Bridges
