= Protector RWS =

Remotely controlled weapons system

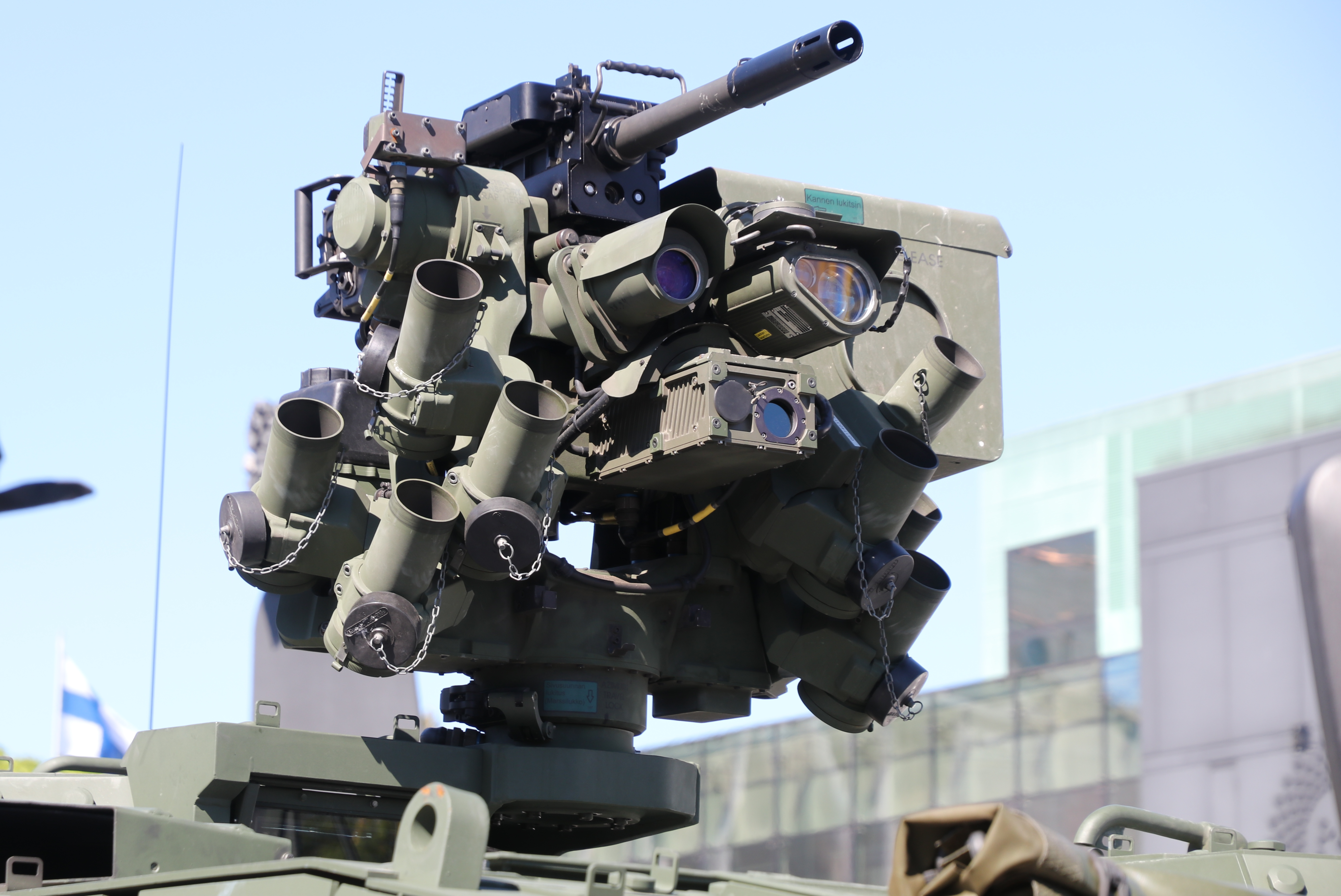
- A Protector RWS used with a HK GMG mounted on a Patria AMV.
- Type: Remote controlled weapon station
- Place of origin: Norway

Service history
- Used by: See Operators

Production history
- Designer: Kongsberg Defence & Aerospace
- Produced: 2001–present
- Variants: See Variants

The Protector RWS is a remotely controlled weapons station (RWS) that can be mounted to vehicles and stationary platforms. It has been in full scale production since December 2001. It is manufactured by Kongsberg Defence & Aerospace of Norway.

== Design ==
The system consists of a stabilized firing platform, a fire-control system and control grips. Several weapons can be mounted to the platform, such as:

- M2 Browning 12.7×99 .50 BMG heavy machine gun
- NSV 12.7×108 heavy machine gun
- M240/FN MAG 7.62×51mm NATO general-purpose machine gun
- M249/FN Minimi 5.56×45mm NATO light machine gun
- MK19 40×53 mm automatic grenade launcher
- H&K GMG 40×53 mm automatic grenade launcher
- XM307 Advanced Crew Served Weapon
- Javelin anti-tank guided missile
- Hellfire anti-tank guided missile (from a modified Protector)

== Versions ==
Several versions of Protector have been developed with more than 20,000 units sold around the world in service with 23 countries. Between the M151 and M153 variants Kongsberg has delivered more than 18,000 systems to the U.S. Armed Forces. These systems are in-service within every branch of the U.S. military and many US agencies.

=== Overview ===
The Protector family includes the RS2, RS4 and RS6 Remote Weapon Stations, with weapons from light machine guns (5.56 mm) to light cannons (30×113mmB M230LF cannon). It also includes the Remote Turrets, designed for medium caliber cannons like 30×173mm and 40×180mm (Mk44 Bushmaster II).

Name	Former name / version / program
RS2	Protector Lite, Protector Super Lite
RS4	M151, M153 (CROWS), Protector nordic
RS4 low profile	RWS Low profile, M153 (CROWS)
RS4 naval	RWS naval, Sea Protector
RS6	RWS LW30, M153 (CROWS)
RT20	MCT-30 (Medium Caliber Turret 30 mm), Protector Medium Caliber RWS
RT40	MCT-30 (Medium Caliber Turret 30 mm); Protector Medium Caliber RWS
RT60	MCT-40 (Medium Caliber Turret 40 mm); Protector Medium Caliber RWS

=== M151 versions ===
- M151 Protector – deployed with the first Stryker brigades
- M151 E1 (Block 1) – includes improved thermal cameras
- M151 E2 (Block 2) – stabilized version
- Several country specific adaptations
- Weight (kg): 135
- Height (mm): 749
- Operating temperature (in °Celsius): −46 to +65
- Storage temperature (in °Celsius): −51 to +71

The system also features 4 M6 Smoke Grenade Dischargers. Specifications (excluding weapons and ammo):

=== M153 Protector ===
M153 Protector is designed to meet CROWS II requirement. Specifications (excluding weapons and ammo):

- Weight (kg): 172
- Height (mm): 762
- Operating temperature (in °Celsius): −46 to +65
- Storage temperature (in °Celsius): −51 to +71

=== Other variants ===
Protector Lite
Protector Lite is a lightweight version for 7.62 mm machine gun with 200 rounds of ammunition carried.
Protector Super Lite
Protector Super Lite is the lightest version currently available, and is a lightweight (30 kg), man-portable system that can be operated both remotely and manually. The Super Lite is fully stabilized and adaptable to any wheeled, tracked or stabilized platform, including tripods.
Protector Medium Caliber RWS
Protector Medium Caliber RWS is designed as a vehicle turret for 20 to 50 mm autocannons, with coaxial machinegun of 5.56 to 7.62 mm. Specifications (including weapons and ammo):
Sea Protector

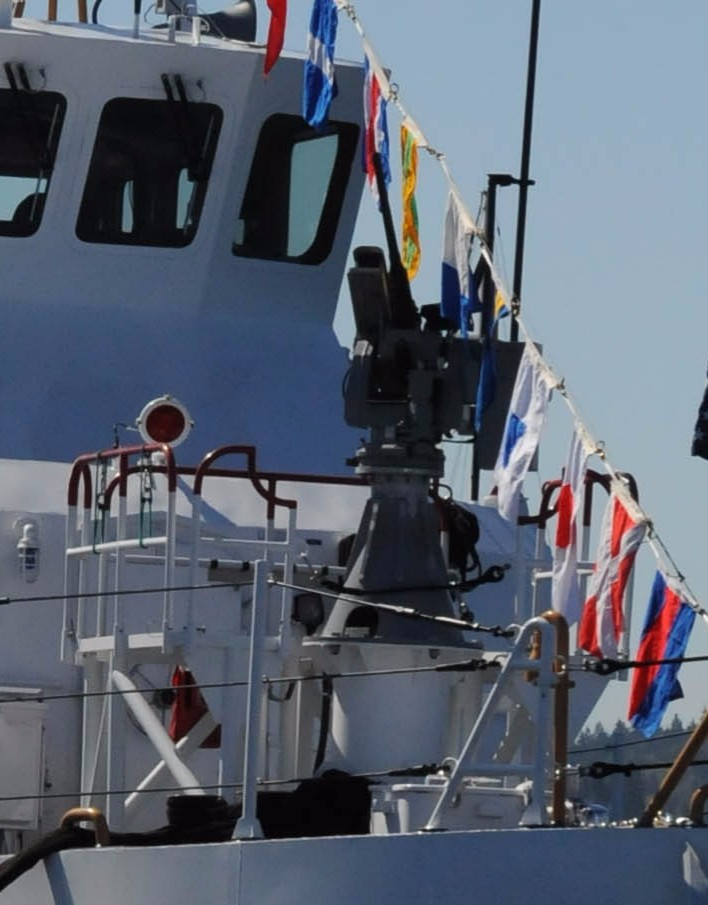
The USCGC Sea Devil (WPB-87368) with an M2 Browning .50 Caliber Machine Gun.

Sea Protector is developed for naval applications.
In operation, maximum azimuth slew rate >100°/s, with maximum elevation slew Rate >50°/s. Range of Elevation −20° to +60°
Protector Dual RWS

Protector Dual RWS mounts two weapons. It provides a dual user functionality (Gunner / Commander). The coaxial weapon is mounted on the same axis as the main gun.

Protector with Non Lethal Effectors
Protector with Non Lethal Effectors is designed to close a capability gap in peacekeeping, peace enforcement and humanitarian operations as well as today's asymmetric warfare.
Protector Nordic
Protector Nordic is claimed by the Norwegian remote weapon station developer as the most technically advanced Protector RWS ordered to date, and is a key element in the foundation for cooperation in the Nordic material programs. The extended functionality includes the Day Camera VIS 95 with 95 field of view and the Infrared Aim Laser (850 nm), both developed by Kongsberg.
Protector NM221
Protector NM221 includes internal ammunition feed.

== Users ==
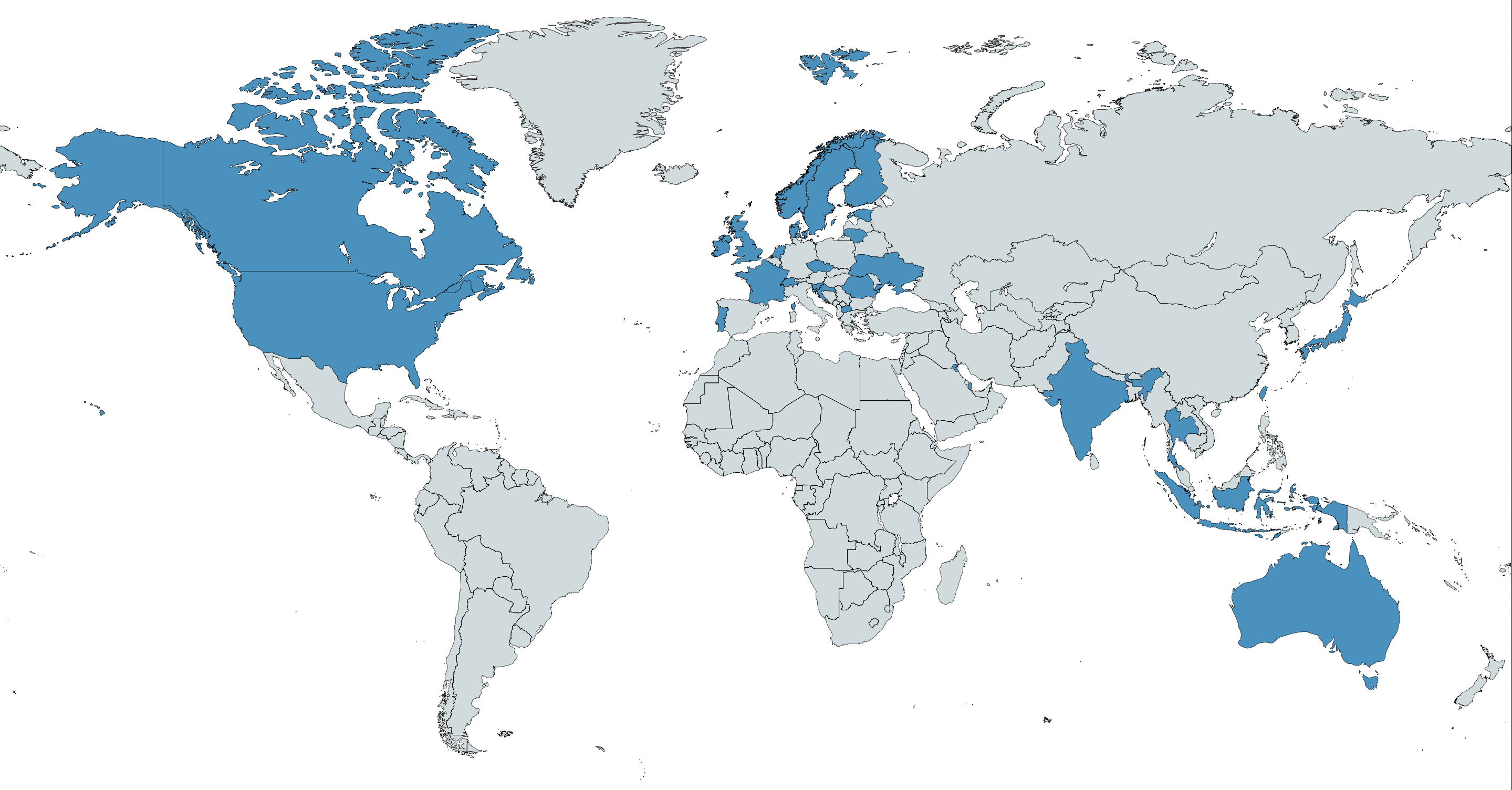
Map with users of the Protector RWS in blue

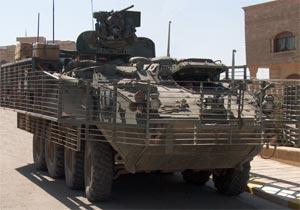
A M151 Protector on a Stryker ICV

- Argentina – Stryker
- Australia – ASLAV PC vehicle
- Canada – Originally installed on the RG-31 fleet in Afghanistan. These were later upgraded and fitted on Leopard 2 support variants (ARV and AEV). Later, 364 procured for TAPV fleet. Additional units are on order for integration on the ACSV fleet, with deliveries starting in late 2020.
- Croatia – Patria AMV, 175
- Czech Republic – LMV
- Denmark – Used on Piranha V vehicles.
- Estonia – CV90 family
- Finland – Patria AMV vehicle
- France – Renault VAB
- India – TATA Kestrel
- Indonesia – KMC Komando Fast Assault Craft & KMC-38M Patrol Vessel (Sea Protector Mk50)
- Ireland – Mowag Piranha IIIH CRV and RG-32M LTV
- Japan – Currently only a few for testing
- Kuwait – VBL Mk 2
- Lithuania – used on Joint Light Tactical Vehicles.
- Luxembourg – Dingo 2 vehicle
- Netherlands – Boxer vehicle
- North Macedonia – Unknown
- Norway – CV90 family (Protector Nordic), NM205F3 APC (Protector NM221), Iveco LMV (Protector Lite), Fridtjof Nansen-class frigate (Sea Protector), HNoMS Maud and Skjold-class corvette (Sea Protector)
- Portugal – Pandur II
- Qatar – to be used on 490 VCBI IFVs.
- Romania – Unknown
- Slovenia – Patria AMV
- Switzerland – Piranha I vehicle cdmt, Mowag Duro IIIP and canot-patrouilleur 16
- Sweden – Sisu Pasi, Patria AMV, Archer Artillery System, RG-32M
- Thailand – Stryker
- Taiwan – Unknown
- Ukraine - Stryker, Sargan 3000
- United Kingdom – used on Mastiff vehicles in Iraq and Afghanistan, Ajax family of vehicles
- United States – Stryker, M1A2 Abrams, and numerous other vehicles. Protector RWS made by Kongsberg Protech Systems USA.

== Gallery ==
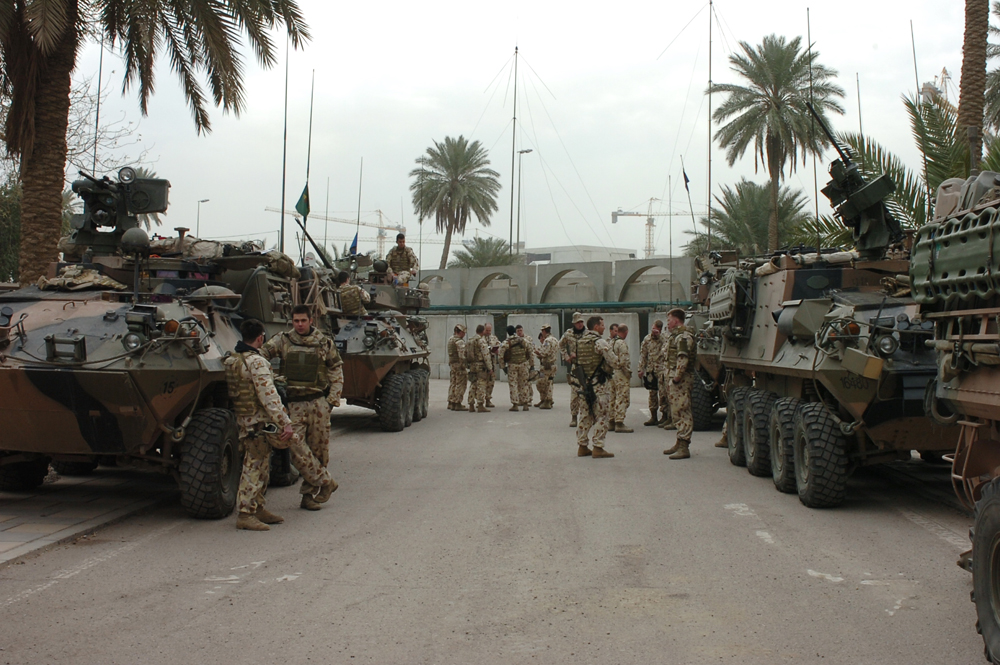
Australian ASLAV-PCs in Iraq

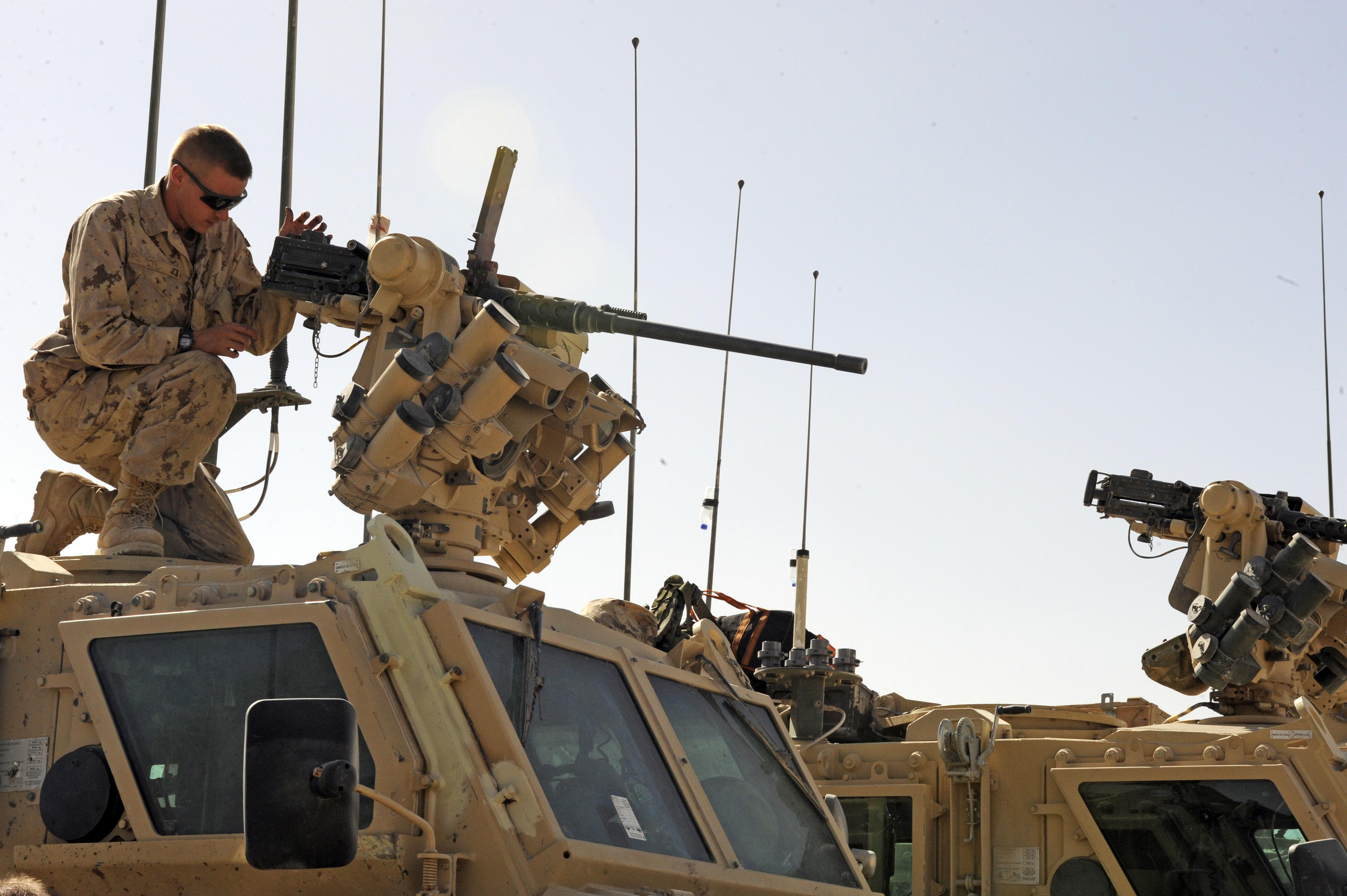
Canadian RG-31s in Afghanistan

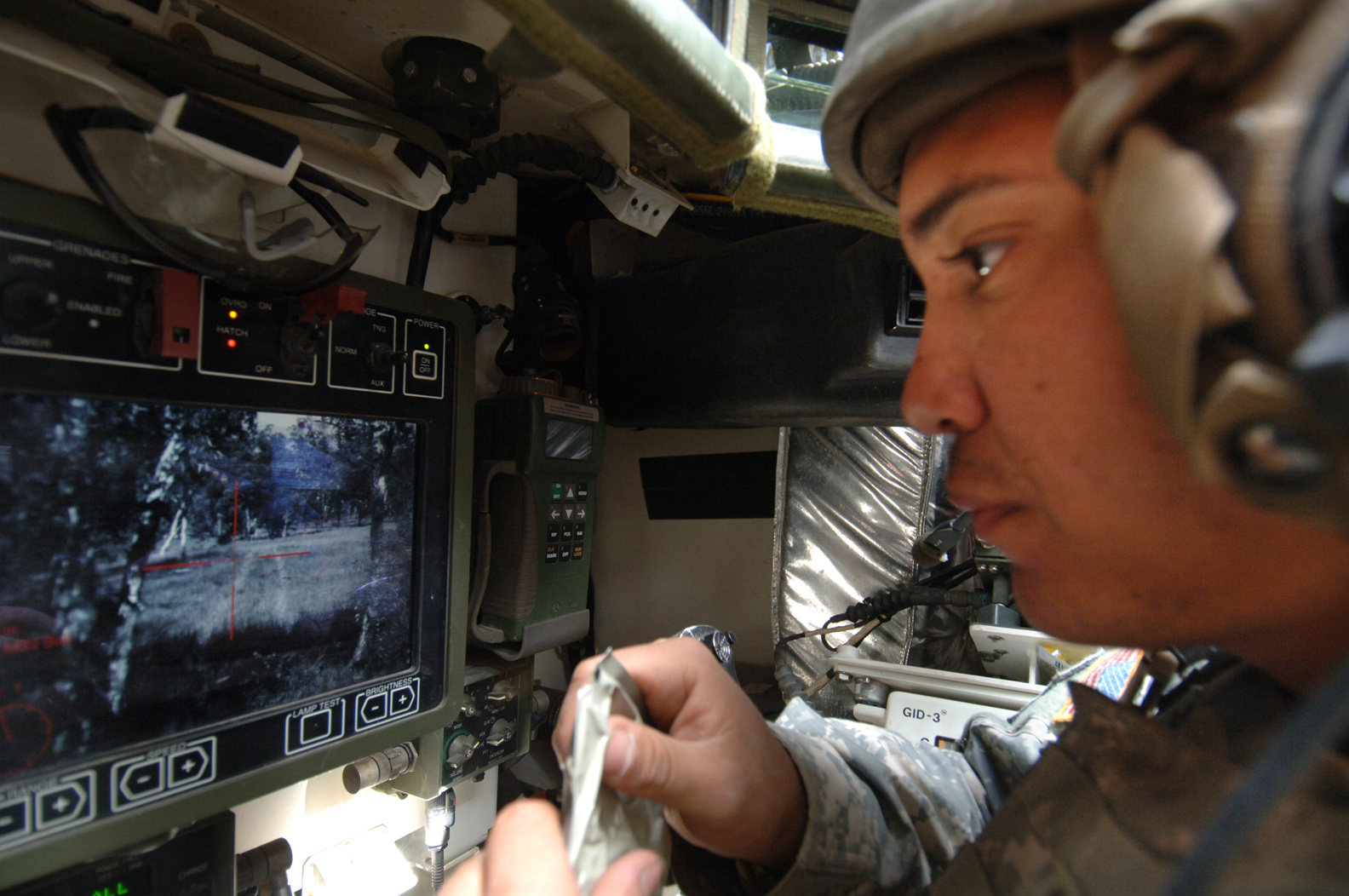
Interior control station for M151 Protector Remote Weapon Station in Stryker ICV

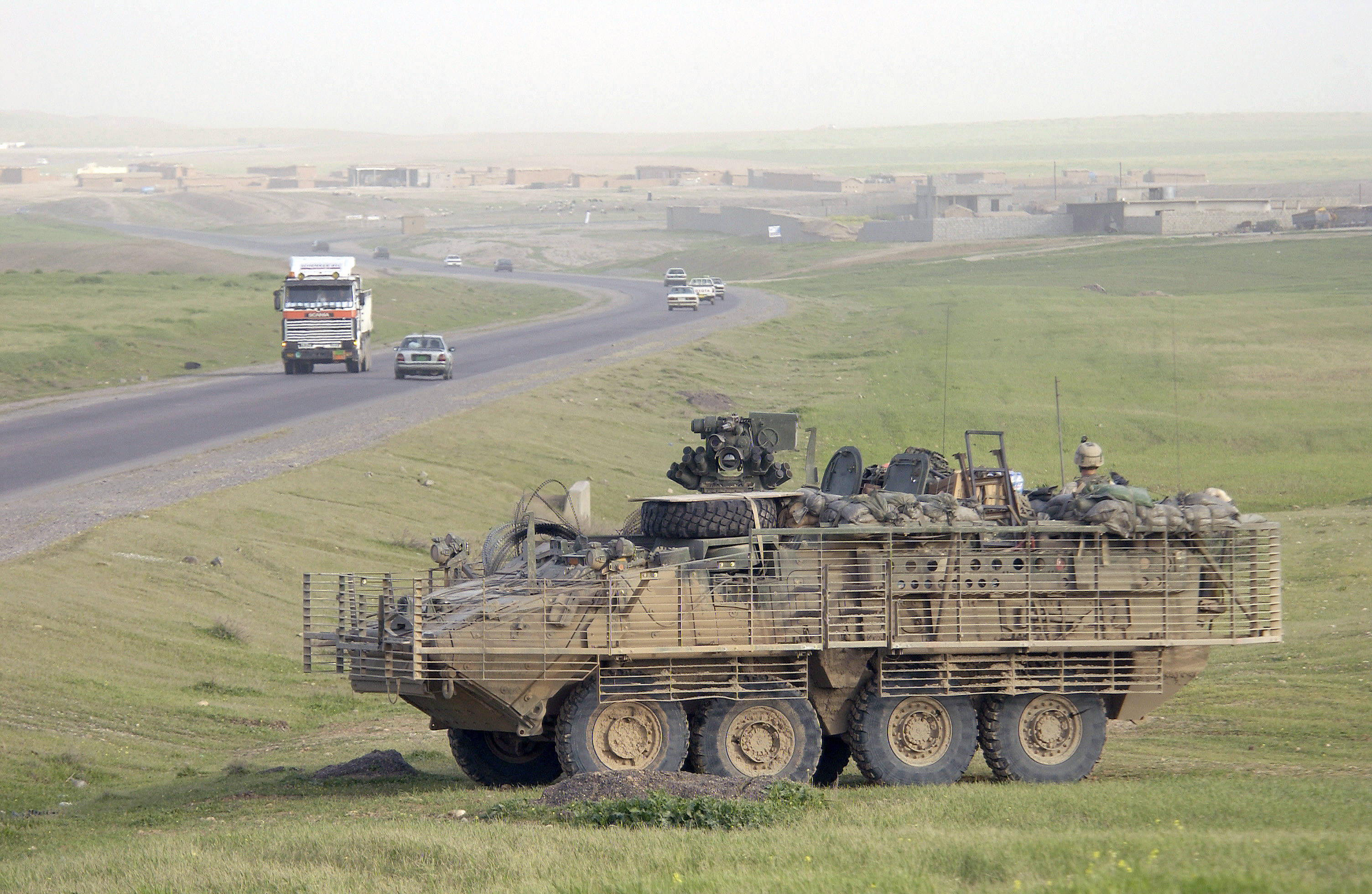
Stryker ICV on patrol in Iraq

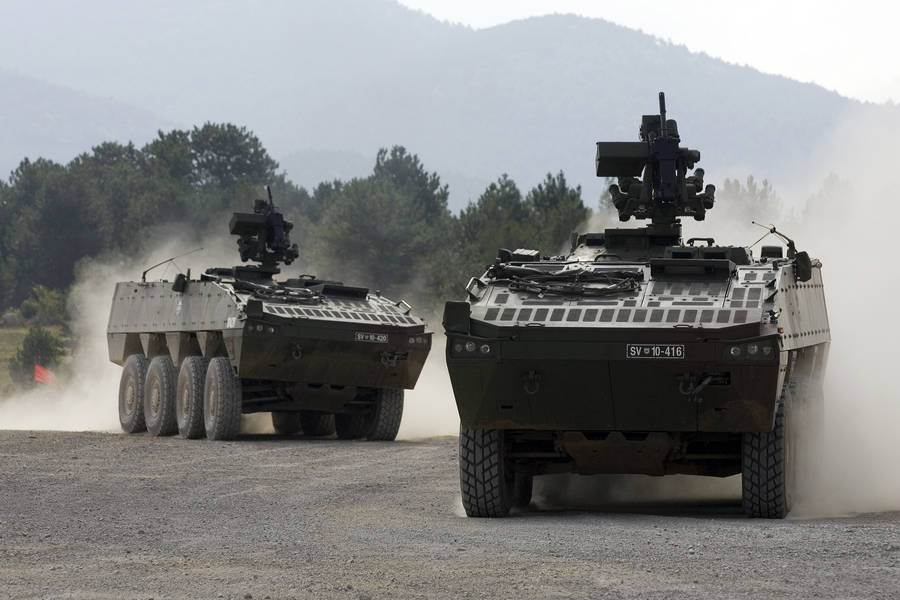
Slovenian Patria AMVs with 40 mm Mk 19 automatic grenade launchers.
