= HNoMS Æger (1936) =

Coordinates: 59°00′27″N 5°43′07″E

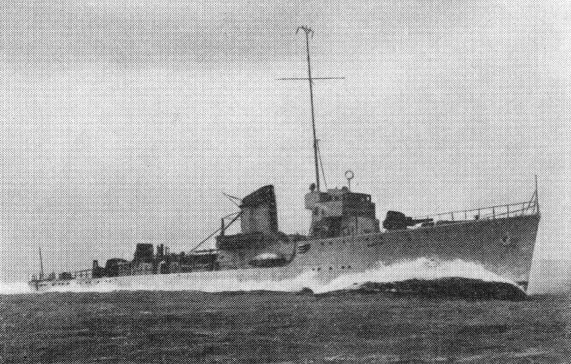
- Æger at sea, sometime before the Second World War

History

Norway
- Name: Æger
- Namesake: Ægir – the Jötunn king of the sea in Norse mythology
- Builder: The Royal Norwegian Navy's shipyard at Karljohansvern, Horten
- Yard number: 122
- Launched: 25 August 1936
- Commissioned: 1936
- Fate: Bombed and beached 9 April 1940

General characteristics
- Class & type: Sleipner-class destroyer
- Displacement: 735 tons
- Length: 74.30 m (243.77 ft)
- Beam: 7.75 m (25.43 ft)
- Draft: 4.15 m (13.62 ft)
- Propulsion: Two De Laval geared turbines with two shafts and 12,500 hp
- Speed: 32 knots (59.26 km/h)
- Range: 3,500 nautical miles (6,482.00 km) at 15 knots (27.78 km/h)
- Complement: 75 men
- Armament: 3 × 10 cm guns; 1 × 40 mm Bofors L/60; anti-aircraft gun; 2 × 12.7 mm Colt; anti-aircraft machine guns; 2 × 53.3 cm trainable torpedo tubes; 4 × depth charge throwers

Service record
- Commanders: Captain Niels Larsen Bruun; (? – 9 April 1940)
- Operations: Opposing the German invasion of Norway
- Victories: 1 ship (6,780 tons) sunk; 2 bombers downed

HNoMS Æger was a Sleipner-class destroyer launched at Karljohansvern naval shipyard in Horten in 1936. The Sleipner class was part of a Norwegian rearmament scheme started as war became ever more likely in the 1930s. When the Germans invaded Norway on 9 April 1940, Æger intercepted and sank the clandestine German supply ship Roda. She was shortly afterwards attacked and sunk by German bombers, claiming two of the attacking aircraft with her anti-aircraft armament before being taken out of action by a heavy bomb. This makes her the first naval ship sunk by aeroplane in hostility.

== Construction ==
Æger was built at Karljohansvern naval shipyard with yard number 122. She was launched on 25 August 1936.

== Second World War ==
After the outbreak of the Second World War, Æger formed part of the Norwegian 2nd Naval District's 2nd Destroyer Division, covering an area roughly the same as the Vestlandet and Trøndelag regions.

=== The German invasion ===
Æger was amongst the first Royal Norwegian Navy units to encounter the German invasion forces of Operation Weserübung when in the early morning of 9 April 1940 she intercepted the German cargo ship Roda off the port city of Stavanger.

==== Roda ====
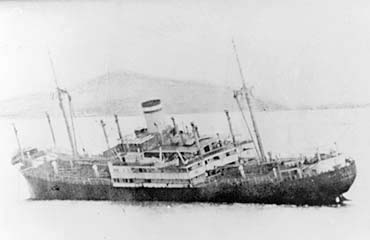
Roda sinking

At around 01:00 on 9 April Norwegian customs officers came on board Æger while she was at anchor in Stavanger and reported their suspicion that the 6,780-ton cargo ship Roda anchored near Ullsnes was probably carrying a different cargo than the 7,000 tons of coke stated in her cargo documents. The German vessel was riding far too high in the water to carry such a cargo. Adding still more suspicion was that the Germans claimed they were bringing the coke to the Norwegian company Sigval Bergesen, a company the customs officers knew had never before taken deliveries of coke. Although the situation was unclear the Norwegian destroyer's commander, Captain Niels Larsen Bruun, decided to take Roda as a prize.

When the Norwegian destroyer found the German ship in the Byfjord near Stavanger and signalled that they were going to seize the German vessel the crew of Roda resisted, leading to Captain Larsen Bruun deciding to sink the cargo ship. After the German crew had abandoned their ship, Æger fired twenty-five 10 cm cold rounds (without explosives) into each side of the vessel, sinking her in deep waters.

==== Air attacks ====
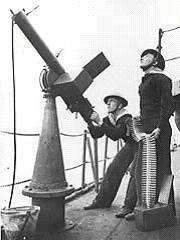
Colt MG52 12.7 mm anti-aircraft machine gun on the destroyer Sleipner

A short while after the sinking of Roda Luftwaffe aircraft started appearing overhead. At 08:30 the first three of in total ten Luftwaffe Junkers Ju 88 bombers from III/Kampfgeschwader 4 began attacking Æger at low altitude. Junkers Ju 87s from StG 1 also attacked the ship and have been credited with its sinking.

Responding with her single 40 mm Bofors gun and two 12.7 mm Colt anti-aircraft machine guns Æger claimed two of the attacking bombers shot down while zig-zagging to avoid the stacks of bombs being unleashed at her. However, while trying to avoid an attack by three aircraft all from different directions Æger was hit amidships by a 250 kg bomb, tearing up the deck of the destroyer and blowing out the sides of the ship.

Seven crew members were killed outright, one mortally and three lightly wounded, with the ship being left dead in the water. Three of the dead were officers and five were enlisted men. As seven more German aircraft continued to attack the crippled destroyer another bomb hit the mast, leaving it bent out of shape but bouncing off into the sea without exploding. Yet another bomb hit the side of the ship midship, but stuck without exploding. All the time the attacking aircraft were pelting the crippled vessel with their machine guns.

As all of the ship's anti-aircraft weapons were by now knocked out, Captain Bruun ordered his crew to abandon ship. The entire surviving crew managed to get ashore without any further casualties.

==== Aftermath ====
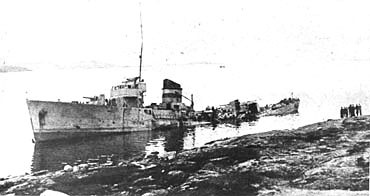
The wreck of Æger near Stavanger in April 1940

Captain Bruun now had fifty-seven unwounded crew members under his command and originally intended to keep his crew together and bring them to unoccupied areas to continue the fight. However, as both Stavanger and the nearby Sola Air Station had been occupied by the invaders, he instead decided to dismiss the crew. He also encouraged them to form small groups and make their way to unoccupied areas to continue the fighting, something a majority of the crew did.

The wreck of Æger later drifted ashore at nearby Hundvåg and attracted many civilian spectators until removed for scrapping. The three 10 cm main guns of Æger were removed by the Germans, the first two in May, the third in August 1940, for use as coastal artillery. The guns were deployed as a harbour defence battery at Grødemhammeren just north of Stavanger.

Roda's cargo later turned out to have been the entire contingent of heavy anti-aircraft guns intended for the defence of Sola Air Station after its capture by German paratroops, the loss of the guns leaving the newly captured air strips vulnerable to RAF attack.

== Bibliography ==
- Abelsen, Frank (1986). Norwegian naval ships 1939–1945 (in Norwegian and English). Oslo: Sem & Stenersen AS. ISBN 82-7046-050-8.
- Berg, Ole F. (1997). I skjærgården og på havet – Marinens krig 8. april 1940 – 8. mai 1945 (in Norwegian). Oslo: Marinens krigsveteranforening. ISBN 82-993545-2-8.
- Bjørnsen, Bjørn (1977). Det utrolige døgnet (in Norwegian). Oslo: Gyldendal Norsk Forlag. ISBN 82-05-10553-7.
- Fjeld, Odd T. (1999). Klar til strid – Kystartilleriet gjennom århundrene (in Norwegian). Oslo: Kystartilleriets Offisersforening. ISBN 82-995208-0-0.
- Haarr, Geirr H. (2009). The German invasion of Norway – April 1940. Barnsley: Seaforth Publishing. ISBN 978-1-84832-032-1.
- Sivertsen, Svein Carl, ed. (2000). Med Kongen til fornyet kamp - Oppbyggingen av Marinen ute under Den andre verdenskrig (in Norwegian). Hundvåg: Sjømilitære Samfund ved Norsk Tidsskrift for Sjøvesen. ISBN 82-994738-8-8.
