= Niels Larsen Bruun =

Norwegian admiral (1893–1970)

- Born: 10 July 1893; Frederikshald, Norway
- Died: 11 July 1970 (aged 77); Oslo, Norway
- Burial place: Vestre gravlund, Oslo
- Other name: Nils Larsen Bruun
- Spouse: Ingrid Sakkestad (m. 1920–1970) (his death)
- Military career
- Allegiance: Norway
- Branch: Royal Norwegian Navy
- Service years: 1915–1957
- Rank: Rear admiral (acting)
- Units: HNoMS Viking (1915–1916); HNoMS Sleipner (1931); HNoMS Heimdal (1931); Royal Norwegian Navy High Command (1946–1949)
- Commands: HNoMS Stegg (1932); HNoMS Æger (1939–1940); 1st Destroyer Division (1939–1940); Royal Norwegian Navy training unit at Port Edgar, Scotland (1941–1942); Sjømilitære korps (1942–1946); Royal Norwegian Naval Academy (1943–1946); Naval District Ålesund (1945–1946); Naval Command Southern Norway (1948–1949); Naval Command Northern Norway (1949–1957)
- Conflicts: Second World War: German invasion of Norway
- Awards: Haakon VII 70th Anniversary Medal; Defence Medal 1940–1945; St. Olav's Medal with Oak Branch

Niels Larsen Bruun (10 July 1893 – 11 July 1970) was a Norwegian officer who served in the Royal Norwegian Navy for more than four decades. Bruun took part in neutrality protection duties during the First World War, seeing service on several naval vessels and assuming his first command. He continued his service in the inter-war years, teaching at naval schools in addition to shipboard service.

At the outbreak of the Second World War Bruun again served on neutrality protection duties, commanding the destroyer Æger. During the first day of the German invasion of Norway, Æger intercepted a German supply ship, which Bruun ordered sunk before he knew for certain if Norway was under attack by the Germans or the Allies. Bruun's own ship was sunk by German bombers the same day, with the surviving crew members dispersing two days later with instructions from Bruun to try to continue to fight.

Bruun escaped German-occupied Norway in 1941, travelling east through Sweden, the Soviet Union, India, and the United States to join the exiled Norwegian forces in the United Kingdom. Remaining in the United Kingdom for the duration of the war, Bruun led units training personnel and officers for the exiled Royal Norwegian Navy.

Returning to Norway at the end of the Second World War, Bruun worked in the administration of the post-war Royal Norwegian Navy. He concluded his career as a rear admiral (acting) in command of the northernmost Norwegian naval command. During the eight years he held his last command, he played an important role in the establishment of the naval component of the Norwegian Home Guard.

== Early and personal life ==
Bruun was born in Frederikshald, Norway, on 10 July 1893. He was the son of the merchant Ludvig Otto Bruun and Magdalene Elise Larsen.

On 17 April 1920 Bruun married Haugesund-born Ingrid Sakkestad, three years his junior, in Haugesund. The couple had a daughter.

== Career ==
In 1912, Bruun joined the Royal Norwegian Naval Academy as a cadet no. 651. Becoming an officer in the Royal Norwegian Navy on 1 October 1915, Bruun saw service on neutrality protection patrols during the First World War, serving as a second lieutenant on the gunboat Viking from 9 October 1915 to 29 April 1916. After the end of the conflict, during which Norway remained neutral, he participated in minesweeping operations from 1918 to 1920.

In November 1917, Bruun graduated from the Royal Norwegian Naval Academy and was promoted from second lieutenant to first lieutenant. From 1917 to 1920 he was in command of a torpedo boat. In the years that followed, he continued his military education with courses in torpedo warfare, naval gunnery and radio training.

In the interwar period he served on Norwegian fishery protection vessels, torpedo boats, minelayers and coastal defence ships. He also served with the navigation department, the 1st Naval District Command and various training units. Amongst the ships on which Bruun served was the gunboat Sleipner, where he served as a first lieutenant from 19 May 1931 to 1 October 1931. At the time, Sleipner was being used as a tender for the Royal Norwegian Navy Air Service. In late 1931, Bruun served on the fishery protection vessel Heimdal during a cruise to Finnmark in the far north of Norway. On 1 July 1931 he was temporarily promoted to the rank of acting captain, a promotion which was made permanent in December 1933. In mid-1932 Bruun held command of the torpedo boat Stegg, and by 1933, he was the second-in-command at the Royal Norwegian Navy's torpedo school. He also worked part-time as a teacher at the Royal Norwegian Navy's mine warfare school.

=== Second World War ===
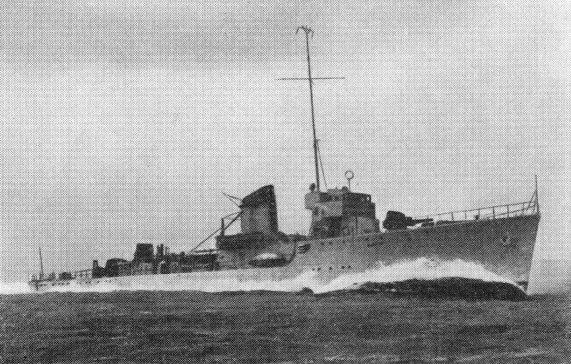
The destroyer Æger at sea, c. 1936

At the outbreak of the Second World War in 1939, Norway declared itself neutral. To defend Norwegian territory from neutrality violations by the warring parties, the Royal Norwegian Navy mobilized. Bruun was put in command of the Sleipner-class destroyer HNoMS Æger, one of the four modern destroyers then in Norwegian service. (Note: The other three modern Norwegian destroyers commissioned by the time of the outbreak of war were Æger's sister ships Sleipner, Gyller, and Odin. Most of the other ships in the service of the Royal Norwegian Navy were old and outdated. Two more Sleipner-class ships, Tor and Balder, were under construction, but not completed by the time of the German invasion.) He was also the commander of the 1st Destroyer Division, consisting of the destroyers Æger, Sleipner, and Gyller. Initially Æger and the other ships of the 1st Destroyer Division were part of the 1st Naval District and were based in Kristiansand, in the south of Norway.

The outbreak of the Finno-Soviet Winter War in late 1939 caused Bruun and the 1st Destroyer Division to be despatched to Northern Norway to protect Norwegian neutrality. With the end of the Winter War in March 1940, the warships then in Northern Norway were redeployed separately along the coast to carry out neutrality patrols. By April 1940, Bruun's destroyer Æger was deployed to the 2nd Naval District, based at Tananger and patrolling the coast between the port city of Stavanger and Haugesund. In addition to Æger, the area between Stavanger and Haugesund was guarded by the old destroyer Draug, the torpedo boat Stegg, the patrol boat Sperm and Motorboat no. 7. Aircraft from the Royal Norwegian Navy Air Service and the Norwegian Army Air Service assisted in patrolling the coastline. (Note: From July 1934 until the 1940 German invasion of Norway, the Royal Norwegian Navy was organized into three naval districts. The 1st Naval District covered the coast from the Norway–Sweden border to the westernmost point in Jæren, the 2nd Naval District was responsible for the coast from Jæren to the northernmost point of the county Nord-Trøndelag, and the 3rd Naval District's area of operations included Nordland, Troms, and Finnmark, as far as the Finland–Norway border in the country's far north-east.)

==== German invasion ====
In the early hours of 8 April, Bruun was ordered to patrol with Æger off Jæren and look for suspicious activity, after the British claimed to have laid a naval minefield in the area. By 09:00 he returned to Tananger and reported to his superiors that nothing out of the ordinary had been observed. Thereafter Bruun brought Æger to Stavanger to restock provisions and carry out maintenance on the destroyer's weapons. The destroyer had only two torpedoes on board. At 22:00 Bruun was ordered by naval command to increase his ship's readiness and prepare for potential war. After hearing on the NRK radio news of the sinking of the German ship Rio de Janeiro off the Norwegian port of Lillesand, and reports of German warship movements in the Kattegat south of Norway, Bruun was increasingly concerned about the situation.

On 9 April 1940, Germany carried out a surprise invasion of Norway, attacking strategic ports along the Norwegian coast. Six naval task forces carried out landings at points from Oslo in the south-east to Narvik in the north of Norway. In addition to the naval landing forces, airborne troops were despatched against the strategically important airports at Sola near Stavanger and Fornebu near Oslo.

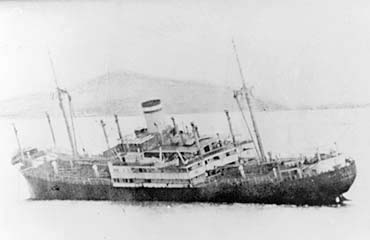
The German supply ship Roda sinking on 9 April 1940

As part of their invasion plan, the Germans sent several supply ships to Norway separately from the invasion force itself. (Note: Beginning on 3 April 1940, the German Kriegsmarine despatched supply ships, troop ships and tankers in advance of the warships of the invasion force. The ships, sailing singly and unescorted to Norway, were planned to be in place in Norwegian ports targeted by the German invasion. The ships sent in advance of the invasion force suffered heavy casualties from Norwegian and British forces.) One of the supply ships, which were camouflaged as civilian merchant ships, was the 6,800 GRT German freighter Roda. Loaded with supplies for German airborne troops set to seize Sola Airport on 9 April 1940, (Note: Sola Airport was captured by 09:00 on 9 April 1940, by German paratroopers of Fallschirmjäger-Regiment 1 jumping from Junkers Ju 52 transport aircraft. The landing was supported by Messerschmitt Bf 110 fighters of Zerstörergeschwader 76 and Junkers Ju 88 bombers of Kampfgeschwader 4.) Roda had set sail from Hamburg on 7 April and arrived at Stavanger in time for the invasion. Roda had anchored off Hundvåg to await the arrival of German invasion forces. The most important of the cargo on board Roda were heavy anti-aircraft guns and four 21 cm coastal artillery pieces meant to secure the Stavanger area once the Germans had seized it.

Shortly after midnight on 9 April Bruun was alerted by the local police and customs officials of the presence of Roda. The officials were suspicious of the ship, as the crew claimed she was loaded with 7,000 tonnes of coke despite the ship appearing to be a passenger/cargo vessel and was riding high in the water for such a heavy cargo. The ship's hatches were blocked by being covered with coke, preventing inspection. The suspicion was further heightened by reports coming in of neutrality violations taking place in Eastern Norway. By 01:05 customs officers boarded Æger and conferred with Bruun about the situation. After meeting with the police, Bruun ordered an inspection of Roda. Before despatching a seven-strong boarding crew led by his second-in-command to Roda, Bruun was approached by the German consulate in Stavanger, whose representatives requested to be let on board the German ship, requests which Bruun rejected. Before boarding Roda, Bruun spoke with his commanding officer, Admiral Carsten Tank-Nielsen on the telephone. Tank-Nielsen supported Bruun's decision to inspect the German ship. Tank-Nielsen also told Bruun to act on his own judgement in case the military situation escalated in Norway. The military commander in Stavanger, Colonel Gunnar Spørck, had also requested that Roda be inspected, as he feared the ship carried German troops, but his message never reached Bruun.

While the boarding crew were away, Bruun received a message from the 2nd Naval District by radio, informing him that the forts in the Oslofjord were in action against unidentified warships. Requests on the part of Bruun regarding the nationality of the intruding foreign ships were never answered. When the boarding crew returned from Roda, they reported that they had been prevented from properly inspecting the ship's cargo. The German captain had opposed the boarding crew in their attempt to access the ship's cargo holds. At 04:15 Bruun received a new report from the 2nd Naval District, informing him that unidentified foreign warships were forcing their way towards the city of Bergen. A follow-up radio message relaying the identity of the intruding warships as German, did not reach Bruun. Relying on the reports he had received, and what he had heard on the radio news, Bruun reasoned that he could not be certain if the intruders were German or British. While awaiting clarification of the situation, he decided to seize Roda as a prize and move his own and the German ship to Riskafjord further to the south. An eight-man prize crew was despatched to Roda with instructions to replace the German flag with the Norwegian naval ensign, disable the ship's radio transmitter, and order the German captain to move to Riskafjord. After the German captain had refused to follow the instructions of the prize crew, Bruun threatened him with opening fire, but the crew on Roda kept delaying while awaiting the coming German invasion.

However, it proceeded slowly... I then tired of it all and decided to sink the ship to get rid of it, war with Germany or not. I figured that if it is not the Germans we are at war with, then the Norwegian state will have to compensate and I be discharged as a naval officer.

— Bruun describing his decision to sink Roda in a 1955 report (Note: Norwegian: Det gikk imidlertid langsomt... ...Jeg ble da lei av det hele og besluttet å senke fartøyet for å bli kvitt det, krig med Tyskland eller ikke. Jeg tenkte at er det ikke tyskerne vi er i krig med, så får den norske stat erstatte og jeg selv få avskjed som sjøoffiser.)

By 06:00 Bruun concluded that it was taking too long for Roda to start her engines, and decided to sink the German ship. Although still not certain about which warring party was attacking Norway, and out of contact with his superiors and other military units, Bruun wanted to end the situation and free up his ship for other tasks. After Bruun had recalled his prize crew and ordered the German crew to abandon ship in their lifeboats, he ordered his gunners to sink the German vessel. Æger first fired 25 "cold" 10 cm rounds (non-explosive shells intended for use as warning shots rather than warfare) into Roda's starboard side, then a further 25 cold rounds into the German ship's port side. Before Roda's captain abandoned ship, he radioed a message describing the situation. Picked up by another German ship in the area, Tübingen, the message had been relayed to the invasion headquarters in Hamburg, Germany. The crew of Æger was stunned by Bruun's order to open fire, which he had to repeat three times before they carried it out. By 08:00 Roda was sinking slowly, finally disappearing beneath the surface by the afternoon of 9 April and settling at a depth of 50 metres (160 ft).

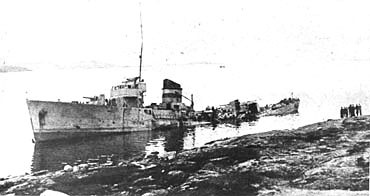
The bombed-out wreck of Æger

Shortly after shelling Roda, Æger observed German aircraft, sightings which revealed the identity of the invaders. Æger opened fire at the aircraft with her anti-aircraft armament. The first wave of German aircraft avoided Æger, but soon after 8–10 German Junkers Ju 88 bombers from the Luftwaffe's Kampfgeschwader 4, thought by Bruun to have been called in by Roda's captain, attacked Æger with machine-gun fire and bombs. The Ju 88s had been attacking Sola Airport, before turning their attention to Æger. Although the German military headquarters in Germany knew of Æger, the Luftwaffe bombers off Stavanger most likely attacked because Æger had opened fire first. Bruun made evasive manoeuvres in the Åmøyfjord off Stavanger and headed for the more open waters of the nearby Byfjorden. The anti-aircraft gunners on Æger returned fire at the German bombers, and claimed to have downed two of them. (Note: According to Luftwaffe records Kampfgeschwader 4 lost only one of its Ju 88s at Stavanger on 9 April 1940.) At 08:30 Æger was struck by a German 250 kg bomb midships, which wrecked the destroyer, killing eight crew members and wounding a further three. As the destroyer was dead in the water and appeared to be sinking, Bruun ordered his crew to man the lifeboats and abandon ship in order to make their way to the island of Hundvåg. The German bombers kept attacking the stationary Æger until Bruun ordered the ship's colours to be struck. The wreck of Æger later drifted ashore on Hundvåg. Following the loss of Æger, Bruun initially retained command of the 57 unwounded survivors of his crew, with the intent of bringing them as a unit to join up with other forces fighting the German invasion elsewhere in Norway. Initially Bruun tried to locate and join up with the local land forces commanded by Colonel Spørck. As German forces were in control of the Stavanger area and were blocking communications, Bruun eventually dismissed his crew on 11 April, instructing them to make their way in small groups out of the area to continue the fight. Some members of the crew managed to escape the Stavanger region and fight in other areas of South Norway.

==== Exile ====
Here in exile all Norwegians are in the same boat. We must just do our best for our country.

— Bruun in August 1941, welcoming a group of Norwegian naval personnel who had escaped occupied Norway and made their way to the United Kingdom (Note: Norwegian: Her i utlendighet er alle nordmenn i samme båt. Vi må bare gjøre vårt beste for landet vårt.)

In 1941 Bruun escaped from German-occupied Norway to neutral Sweden. In a three-month journey, he made his way from Sweden to the Soviet Union, passing through Moscow and Baku on his way to India, then travelling through the United States before making the final stretch from New York City to the United Kingdom. After making his way to the United Kingdom, Bruun joined the Norwegian Armed Forces in exile. From 1941 to 1942 he commanded the Royal Norwegian Navy's training unit at Port Edgar in Scotland. In 1942 he was promoted to the rank of commander, and from February that year headed the Sjømilitære korps – the unit responsible for training enlisted personnel and non-commissioned officers for the Royal Norwegian Navy. Starting on 18 June 1943 he also commanded the exiled Royal Norwegian Naval Academy. Part of Bruun's job as head of the Sjømilitære korps in exile was to formalize and bring order to the improvised system of recruitment employed by low-level commanders up until that point. Each warship commander had in the early phase of the Royal Norwegian Navy's time in exile personally recruited and employed crew members for his ship. At the Royal Norwegian Naval Academy, which had been re-established in the United Kingdom in January 1943, Bruun played a central role in adapting the academy to the conditions of war and exile. The academy's curriculum changed, with an increased focus on practical training. On Bruun's initiative, the academy in 1944 replaced its old entrance requirement for cadets to a new one adapted to the conditions of exile in the United Kingdom. While the old requirements had included secondary education and prior service in the merchant navy, the new ones required Examen artium qualifications in science and mathematics. The reform was motivated by a lack of potential cadets with a background in the merchant navy, combined with an ample supply of university students amongst Norwegian refugees who had made their way to neutral Sweden. One Norwegian naval cadet who joined the Royal Norwegian Navy in the United Kingdom in August 1941 described Bruun as having an informal and encouraging way of interacting with lower ranking naval personnel, instilling in the cadet "a feeling of security" as well as "eagerness and a go-ahead spirit".

During the Allied operations in Norway following the German surrender in May 1945, Bruun was deployed to Naval Command Mid-Norway as a district commander, based in Ålesund. He held this position until May 1946.

=== Post-war ===
Bruun continued to command both Sjømilitære korps and the Royal Norwegian Naval Academy until 1 May 1946, when he transferred to the Royal Norwegian Navy High Command, where he led the command section. The re-establishment of the Royal Norwegian Naval Academy on Norwegian soil in late 1945 proved a challenging task for Bruun. The buildings in Horten, which the academy had used until the German invasion in 1940, had been taken over by other military institutions by the time Bruun returned to Norway. Horten's military facilities had suffered heavily from bombing during the war years, with many buildings completely destroyed. Without asking for permission from his military superiors, Bruun decided to move the academy to Oslo, requisitioning several former German wooden barracks in Vogts gate in Sagene as the academy's temporary new home. Bruun was criticized by his superiors for his unauthorized act, but the academy was allowed to stay in the buildings he had taken over. In 1945 he unsuccessfully applied for four different positions within the Royal Norwegian Navy: a promotion to the rank of rear admiral and command of Naval Command East, a promotion to the rank of rear admiral and command of Naval Command West, a promotion to the rank of commodore and command of Naval Command Trøndelag, and a promotion to the rank of rear admiral and command of Naval Command North. The following year, 1946, he was promoted to the rank of commodore.

In the period 1948 to 1949 he held temporary command of Naval Command Southern Norway. From November 1949 to 1957 he was in charge of Naval Command Northern Norway, holding the rank of acting rear admiral. During his last assignment Bruun's headquarters was located first in the city of Tromsø, then in Harstad. In 1951 he unsuccessfully applied for three different positions: a promotion to the rank of permanent rear admiral and command of Naval Command Western Norway, a position as commodore and commander of Naval Command Southern Norway, and a promotion to the rank of permanent rear admiral and command of Naval Command Eastern Norway. He retired from the Royal Norwegian Navy on 1 January 1957.

During his years in Northern Norway, Bruun played a role in the establishment of the naval component of the Norwegian Home Guard. In mid-1949, he was one of five high-ranking and mid-level officers who held discussions with the commander of the Royal Norwegian Navy, Admiral Edvard Christian Danielsen, during the latter's fact-finding mission to Northern Norway in connection with a potential establishment of a Naval Home Guard. (Note: The other officers involved in the 1949 meetings with Admiral Danielsen were Home Guard major Håkon Kyllingmark, Home Guard captain Boy Rist, Lieutenant Commander Hartvig Sverdrup, and Rear Admiral Thore Horve.) These discussions led to the first Naval Home Guard courses being held 1951, at Reine in the Lofoten Islands, within Bruun's area of command. From Northern Norway, the Naval Home Guard was expanded to the other regions of Norway. Bruun's involvement with the establishment of the Naval Home Guard has led to some authors referring to him as "the father of the Naval Home Guard". Bruun was enthusiastic about expanding the Home Guard from a solely land-based force to one which included a branch that operated along the coast using requisitioned fishing vessels. Bruun provided the Naval Home Guard in his region with ample supplies of equipment, ammunition and explosives, and flexible rules of operation. This attitude set Bruun aside from many of his colleagues, who did not see a role for the Royal Norwegian Navy in cooperating with the Naval Home Guard. Bruun also promoted closer cooperation between the Naval Home Guard and the Norwegian Coast Guard in patrolling the coastline, and in inspecting and detaining fishing vessels operating in breach of Norwegian laws.

In addition to his military work, Bruun wrote several journal articles on naval matters, including a 1936 article in the naval journal Norsk tidsskrift for sjøvesen detailing his views on the future role and disposition of aircraft in the Norwegian Armed Forces. In 1949 Bruun contributed two articles to the 60th anniversary book of the Stavanger Military Association, one on the naval strategic value of Rogaland and Stavanger, and another on his experiences as the commander of the destroyer Æger on 9 April 1940. In addition to military-oriented articles, Bruun in 1932 wrote a piece published in the newspaper Aftenposten, detailing his experiences celebrating Christmas in Finnmark in 1931, including a visit and performance by star boys on board his ship while at anchor in the town of Vardø.

Bruun died in Oslo on 11 July 1970, and was buried at the cemetery Vestre gravlund in Oslo on 14 August 1970.

== Honours and awards ==
For his service in exiled Norwegian forces Bruun was awarded the Haakon VII 70th Anniversary Medal and the Defence Medal 1940–1945. In 1949 he received the St. Olav's Medal with Oak Branch as further recognition for his wartime service, specifically for his efforts during the 1940 Norwegian Campaign.
