= Royal Norwegian Navy =

- Sjøforsvaret
- Coat of arms
- Founded: 955, 1509 (not official); April 12, 1814; 212 years ago
- Country: Norway
- Type: Navy
- Role: Naval warfare
- Size: 4,009 personnel as of 2020
- Part of: Norwegian Armed Forces
- Headquarters: Haakonsvern
- Engagements: Civil War - King Sverre (1197); Scottish–Norwegian War (1262-1266); Swedish War of Liberation (1510–23); Count's Feud (1534–36); Nordic Seven Years' War (1563–70); Kalmar War (1611–13); Torstenson War (1643–45); Second Nordic War (1657–60); Scanian War (1675–79); Great Nordic War (1700 & 1709–20); Action of 16 May 1797; Battle of Copenhagen (1801); Battle of Copenhagen (1807); Gunboat War (1807–14); First Schleswig War (1848–51); World War II (1940–45); Cold War (1945–92); War on terror (2001– ) Operation Prosperity Guardian (2023– )

Commanders
- Commander-in-Chief: Haakon VIII
- Prime Minister: (Norway) Jonas Gahr Støre
- Minister of Defence: Tore O. Sandvik
- Chief of Defence: General Eirik Kristoffersen
- Chief of the Royal Norwegian Navy: Rear Admiral Oliver Berdal
- Command Master Chief Petty Officer of the Royal Norwegian Navy: Master Chief Petty Officer Arild Edinsen
- Notable commanders: Peter Tordenskjold; Cort Adeler; Niels Juel; Lauritz Galtung; Kristoffer Throndsen; Henrik Bjelke; Niels Larsen Bruun; Thore Horve; Leif Larsen

Insignia
- Pennant and Naval Jack

- Naval Ensign

The Royal Norwegian Navy (Norwegian: Sjøforsvaret, lit. 'Sea defence') is the branch of the Norwegian Armed Forces responsible for naval operations of Norway, including those of the Norwegian Coast Guard. As of 2008, the Royal Norwegian Navy consists of approximately 3,700 personnel (9,450 in mobilized state, 32,000 when fully mobilized) and 70 vessels, including 4 heavy frigates, 6 submarines, 14 patrol boats, 4 minesweepers, 4 minehunters, 1 mine detection vessel, 4 support vessels and 2 training vessels.

This navy has a history dating back to 955. From 1509 to 1814, it formed part of the navy of Denmark-Norway, also referred to as the "Common Fleet". Since 1814, the Royal Norwegian Navy has again existed as a separate navy.

In Norwegian, all its naval vessels since 1946 bear the ship prefix KNM, which stands for "Kongelige Norske Marine" (which translates to "Royal Norwegian Navy"); in English, these vessels are identified by the prefix HNoMS, meaning "His/Her Norwegian Majesty's Ship". (Note: HNMS could be also used for the Royal Netherlands Navy, for which HNLMS is used instead) Coast Guard vessels bear the prefix KV, for "Kystvakt" (which translates to "Coast Guard"); in English, these vessels are identified by the prefix NoCGV, for "Norwegian Coast Guard Vessel".

== History ==
=== Early history ===
The history of Norwegian state-operated naval forces is long, and goes back to the leidang which was first established by King Håkon the Good at the Gulating in 955, although variants of the Leidang had at that time already existed for hundreds of years. During the last part of the Middle Ages the system of levying of ships, equipment, and manpower for the leidang was mainly used to levying tax and existed as such into the 17th Century.

During most of the union between Norway and Denmark the two countries had a common fleet. This fleet was established by King Hans in 1509 in Denmark. A large proportion of the crew and officers in this new Navy organisation were Norwegian. In 1709 there were about 15,000 personnel enrolled in the common fleet; of these 10,000 were Norwegian. When Peter Tordenskjold carried out his famous raid at Dynekil in 1716 more than 80 percent of the sailors and 90 percent of the soldiers in his force were Norwegian. Because of this the Royal Norwegian Navy shares its history from 1509 to 1814 with the Royal Danish Navy.

The modern, separate Royal Norwegian Navy was founded (restructured) on April 12, 1814, by Prince Christian Fredrik on the remnants of the Dano-Norwegian Navy. At the time of separation, the Royal Dano-Norwegian Navy was in a poor state and Norway was left with the lesser share. All officers of Danish birth were ordered to return to Denmark and the first commander of the Norwegian navy became Captain Thomas Fasting. It then consisted of 39 officers, seven brigs (one more under construction), one schooner-brig, eight gun schooners, 46 gun chalups and 51 gun barges. April 1, 1815, the Royal Norwegian Navy's leadership was reorganized into a navy ministry, and Fasting became the first navy minister.

Norway retained its independent armed forces, including the navy, during the union with Sweden. During most of the union the navy was subjected to low funding, even though there were ambitious plans to expand it. In the late 19th century, the fleet was increased to defend a possible independent Norway from her Swedish neighbours.

In 1900, just five years prior to the separation from Sweden, the navy, which was maintained for coastal defence, consisted of: two British-built coastal defence ships (HNoMS Harald Haarfagre and HNoMS Tordenskjold – each armored and displacing about 3,500 tons), four ironclad monitors, three unarmored gun vessels, twelve gunboats, sixteen small (sixty ton) gunboats, and a flotilla of twenty-seven torpedo boats. These were operated by 116 active duty officers (with an additional sixty reserve) and 700 petty officers and seamen.

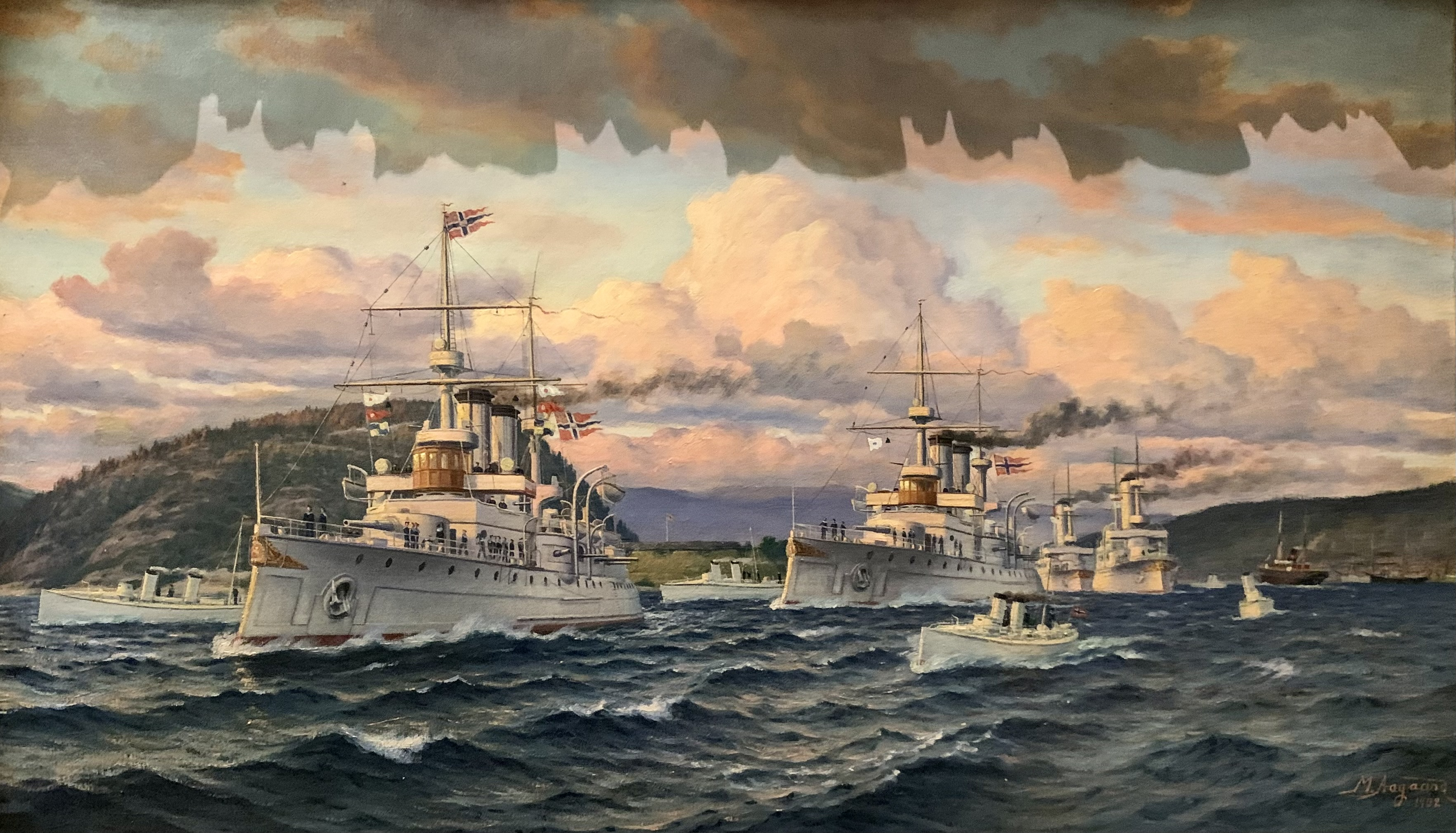
Hårfagre og Tordenskjold

=== World War I ===
Norway was neutral during World War I, but the armed forces were mobilised to protect Norway's neutrality. The neutrality was sorely tested – the nation's merchant fleet suffered heavy casualties to German U-boats and commerce raiders.

=== World War II ===
World War II began for the Royal Norwegian Navy on April 8, 1940, when the German torpedo boat Albatross attacked the guard ship Pol III. In the opening hours of the Battle of Narvik, the old coastal defence ships ("panserskip") HNoMS Eidsvold and HNoMS Norge, both built before 1905 and hopelessly obsolete, attempted to put up a fight against the invading German warships; both were torpedoed and sunk. The German invasion fleet heading for Oslo was significantly delayed when Oscarsborg Fortress opened fire with two of its three old 28 cm guns, followed by the 15 cm guns on Kopås on the eastern side of the Drøbak strait. The artillery pieces inflicted heavy damage on the German heavy cruiser Blücher, which was subsequently sunk by torpedoes fired from Oscarsborg's land-based torpedo battery. Blücher sank with over 1,000 casualties among its crew and soldiers aboard. The German invasion fleet – believing Blücher had struck a mine – retreated south and called for air strikes on the fortress. This delay allowed King Haakon VII of Norway and the Royal family, as well as the government, to escape capture.

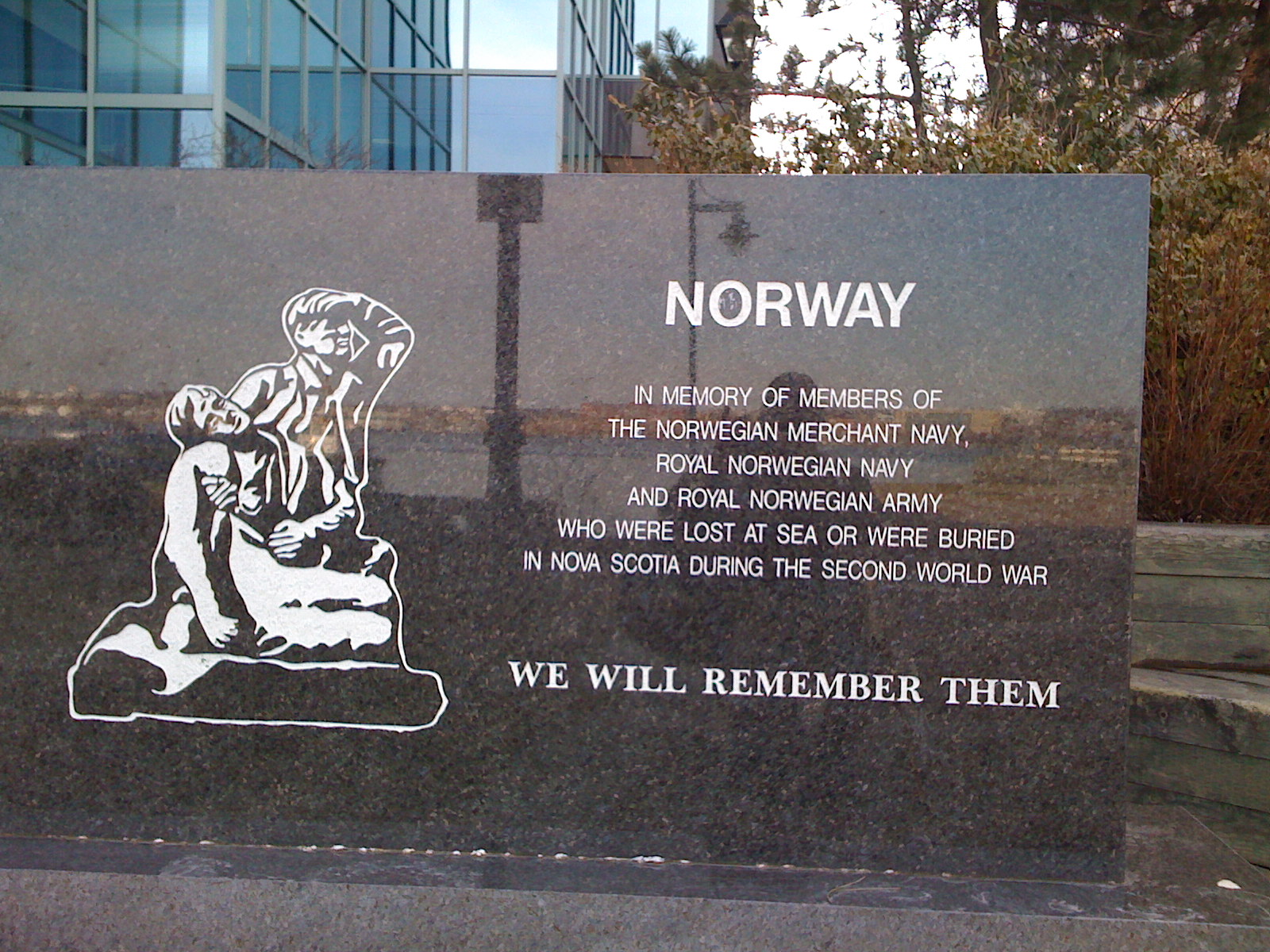
Memorial to members of the Royal Norwegian Navy, Army and Merchant Marine in Halifax, Nova Scotia, Canada, on the flag plaza outside the Maritime Museum of the Atlantic

On June 7, 1940, thirteen vessels, five aircraft and 500 men from the Royal Norwegian Navy followed the King to the United Kingdom and continued the fight from bases there until the war ended. The number of men was steadily increased as Norwegians living abroad, civilian sailors and men escaping from Norway joined the Royal Norwegian Navy. Funds from Nortraship were used to buy new ships, aircraft and equipment.

Ten ships and 1,000 men from the Royal Norwegian Navy participated in the Normandy Invasion in 1944.

During the war the navy operated 118 ships, at the end of the war it had 58 ships and 7,500 men in service. They lost 27 ships, 18 fishing boats (of the Shetland bus) and 933 men in World War II.

The navy had its own air force from 1912 to 1944.

After the war, three Type VII U-boats which had surrendered to the Allies in May 1945 were transferred to the Royal Norwegian Navy : U-926, U-995 and U-1202 entered service as Kya, Kaura and Kinn respectively.

=== 1960s to present ===
The building of a new fleet in the 1960s was made possible with substantial economic support from the United States. During the Cold War, the navy was optimized for sea denial in coastal waters to make an invasion from the sea as difficult and costly as possible. With that mission in mind, the Royal Norwegian Navy consisted of a large number of small vessels and up to 15 small diesel-electric submarines. The navy is now replacing those vessels with a smaller number of larger and more capable vessels.

The Royal Norwegian Navy Museum is dedicated to the preservation and promotion of Norway's naval history.

=== Ensign and Jack ===
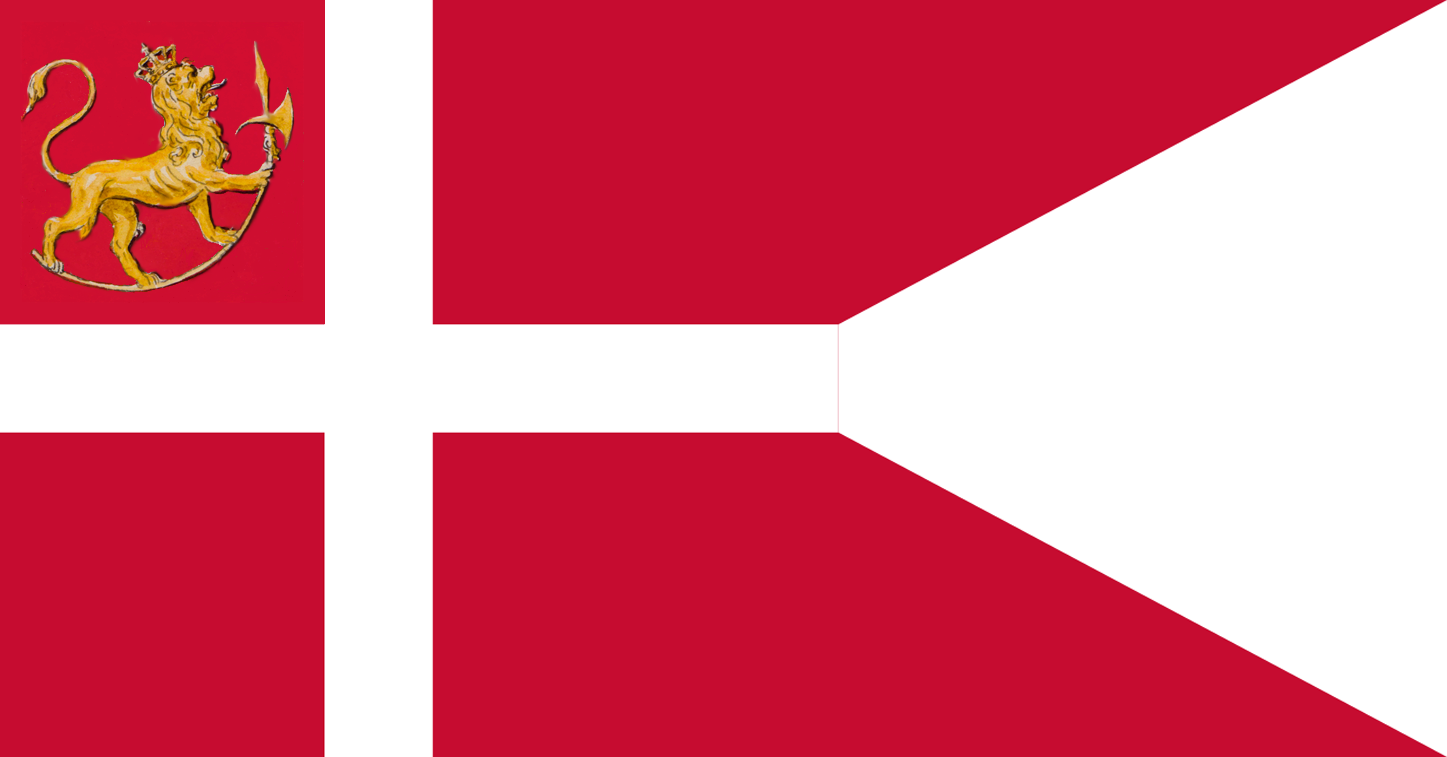
Naval Ensign 1814–1815

Naval Ensign 1815–1844
(during Union with Sweden, also used by the Swedish Navy)

Naval Ensign 1844–1905
(during Union with Sweden)

Naval Ensign since 1905

Naval Jack 1844–1905
(during Union with Sweden, also used by the Swedish Navy)

Naval Jack since 1905

== Bases ==
Royal Norwegian Navy bases

Some of The Royal Norwegian Navy's bases are:

- Haakonsvern in Bergen Municipality (main base for the navy).
- Ramsund in Tjeldsund Municipality, between the towns of Harstad and Narvik (special operations/Marinejegerkommandoen)
- Trondenes Fort in Harstad Municipality (Coastal Ranger Command)
- Sortland Naval Base in Sortland Municipality (Coast Guard Squadron North)
- KNM Harald Haarfagre in Stavanger Municipality (basic training facility for navy and air force conscripts)
- Karljohansvern in Horten Municipality (training facility)

== Organization ==
The Navy is organized into the Fleet, the Coast Guard, and the main bases.

The Fleet consists of:

- Fleet Chief Staff,
- 1st Frigate Squadron (1. Fregattskvadron)
- Submarine Branch (Ubåtvåpenet)
- 1st Corvette Squadron (1. Korvettskvadron)
- 1st Minesweeper Squadron (1. Minerydderskvadron)
- Fleet Logistics Commando (Marinens Logistikkkommando)
- Coastal Ranger Commando (Kystjegerkommandoen)
- Naval EOD Command (Minedykkerkommandoen)

The Naval Schools are:

- Royal Norwegian Naval Basic Training Establishment, KNM Harald Haarfagre, Stavanger
- Royal Norwegian Navy Officer Candidate School, Horten and Bergen
- Royal Norwegian Naval Academy, Laksevåg, Bergen
- Royal Norwegian Naval Training Establishment, KNM Tordenskjold, Haakonsvern, Bergen

Two of the schools of the Navy retain ship prefixes, reminiscent of Royal Navy practises.

Museum: Royal Norwegian Navy Museum, Horten

== Fleet units and vessels (present) ==
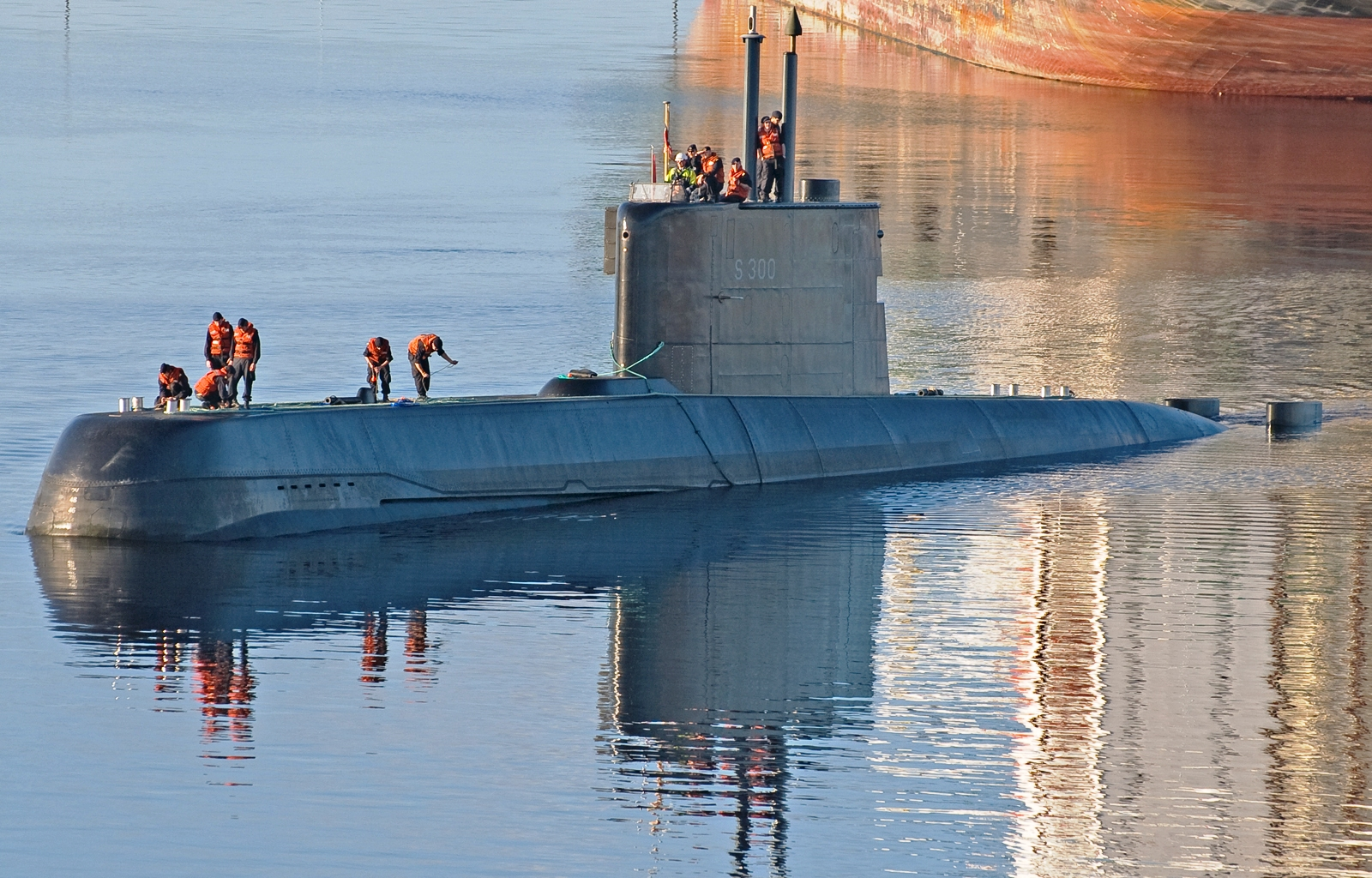
Ula class submarine

=== Submarine Branch ===
The submarine fleet consists of several Ula-class submarines. "Ubåtvåpenet" maintain six Ula-class submarines:

- Ula (S300)
- Utsira (S301)
- Utstein (S302)
- Utvær (S303)
- Uthaug (S304)
- Uredd (S305)

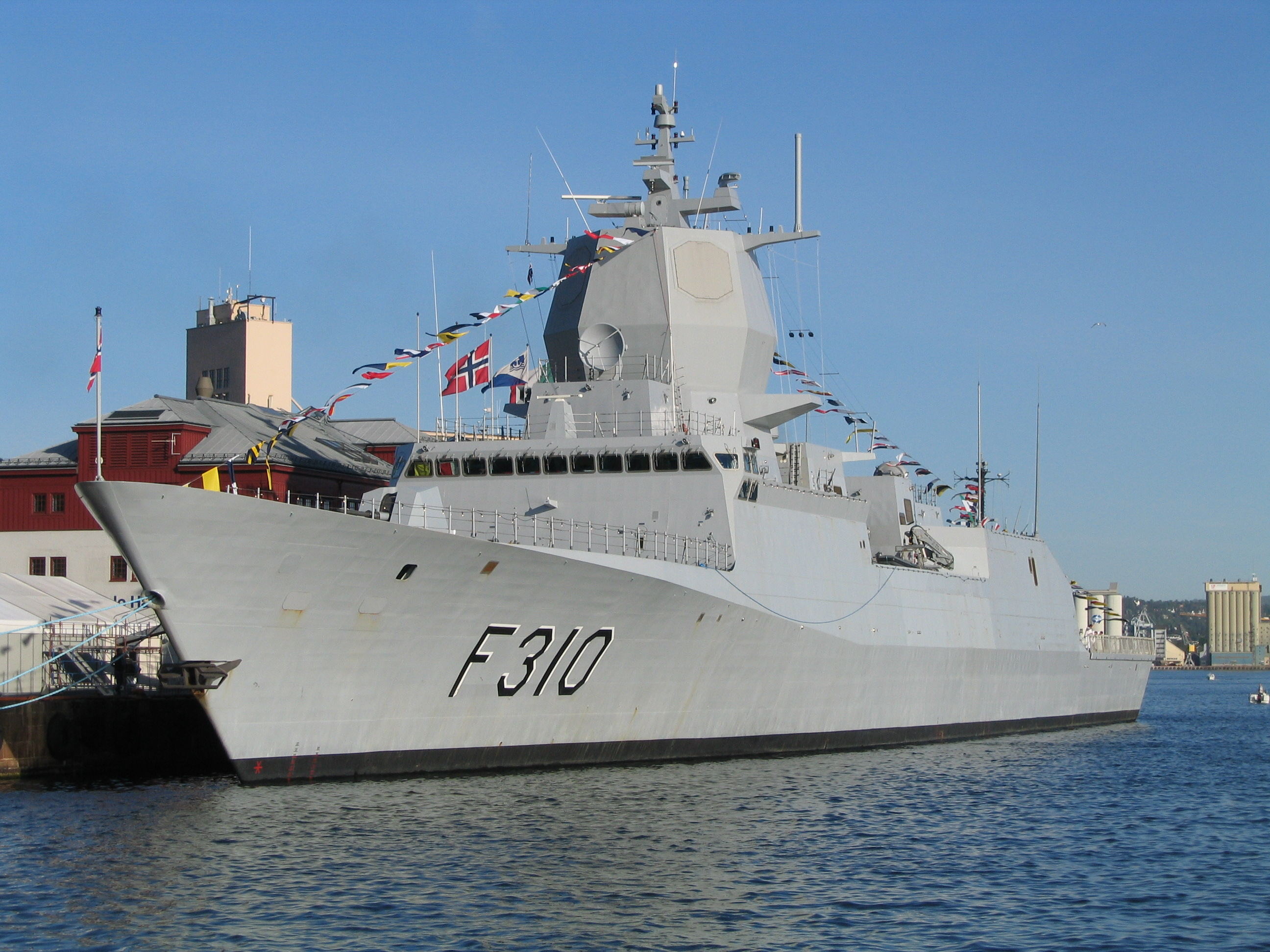
HNoMS Fridtjof Nansen

=== 1st Frigate Squadron ===
Note: These ships are generally considered destroyers by their officers and other navies due to their size and role. Helge Ingstad was decommissioned and sold for scrap after a collision with an oil tanker in November 2018 severely damaged the ship.

- Fridtjof Nansen-class frigate. Five vessels commissioned. Since late 2018, four in service.
  - Fridtjof Nansen (F310) Launched June 3, 2004. Commissioned April 5, 2006.
  - Roald Amundsen (F311) Launched May 25, 2005. Commissioned May 21, 2007.
  - Otto Sverdrup (F312) Launched April 28, 2006. Commissioned April 30, 2008.
  - Thor Heyerdahl (F314) Launched February 11, 2009. Commissioned January 18, 2011.

=== 1st Corvette Squadron ===
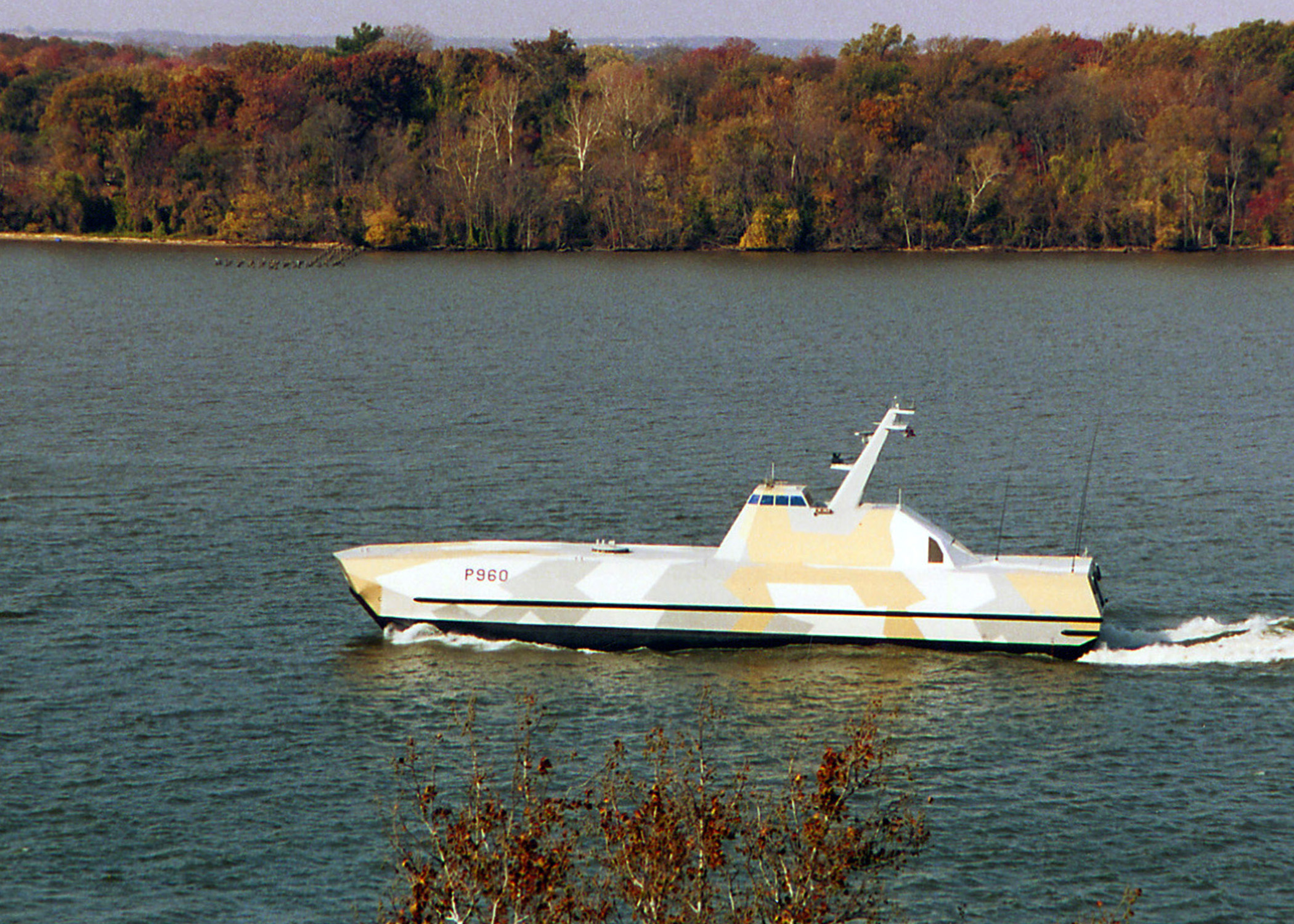
Skjold-class patrol boat

The Coastal Warfare fleet consists of Skjold-class corvettes.

- Missile Patrol Boat (Skjold class), all 6 commissioned:

- Skjold (P960) Launched September 22, 1998. Commissioned April 17, 1999
- Storm (P961) Launched November 1, 2006.
- Skudd (P962) Launched April 30, 2007.
- Steil (P963) Launched January 15, 2008.
- Glimt (P964)
- Gnist (P965)

=== Mine Branch ===
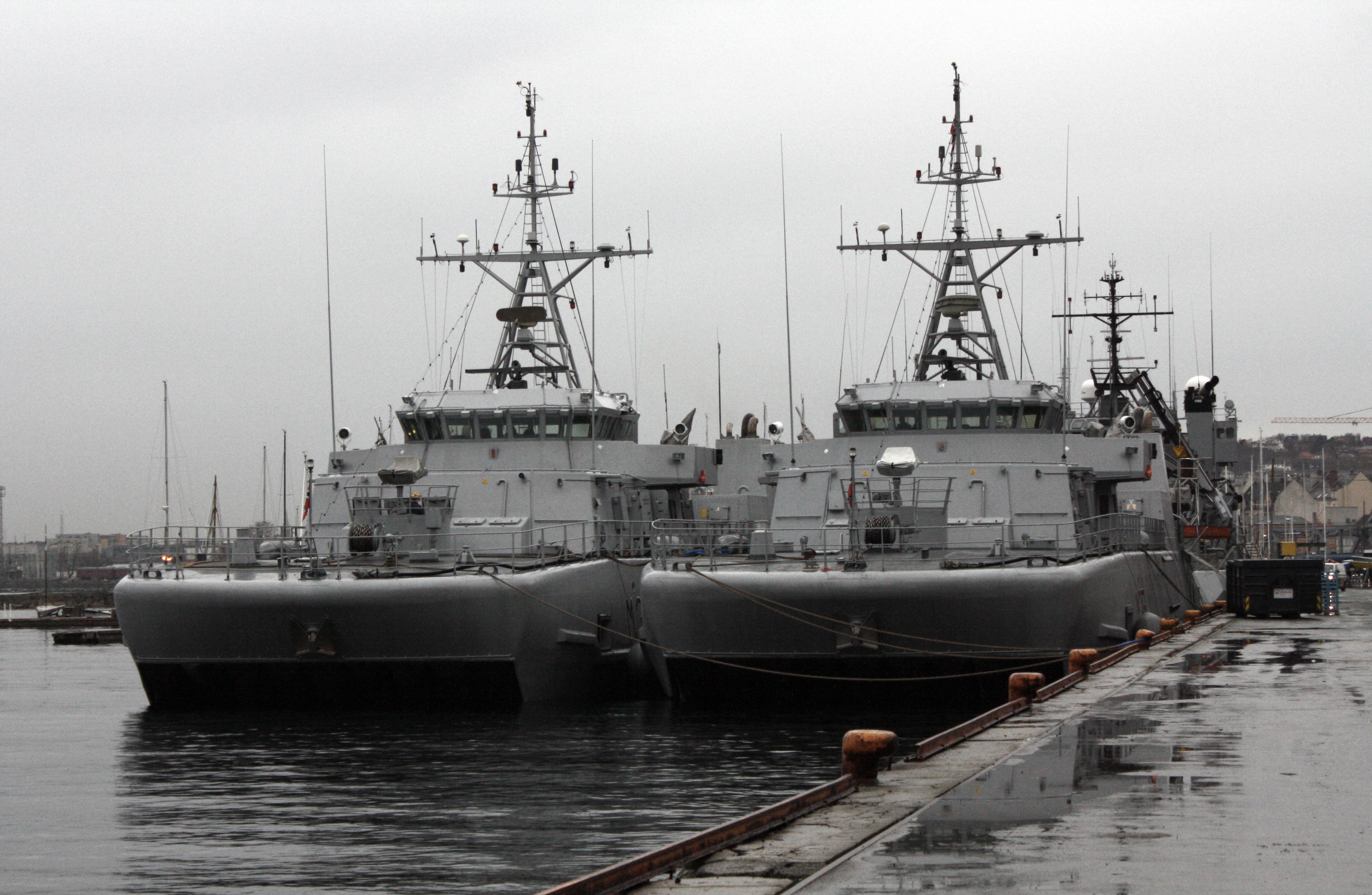
HNoMS Otra and HNoMS Hinnøy

- 1st Mine Clearing Squadron
  - Flagship
    - Nordkapp A531 (1980) - former coast guard patrol vessel (W320) commissioned into navy service effective 1 November 2022.
  - Oksøy-class mine hunter (1994)
    - Måløy M342
    - Hinnøy M343

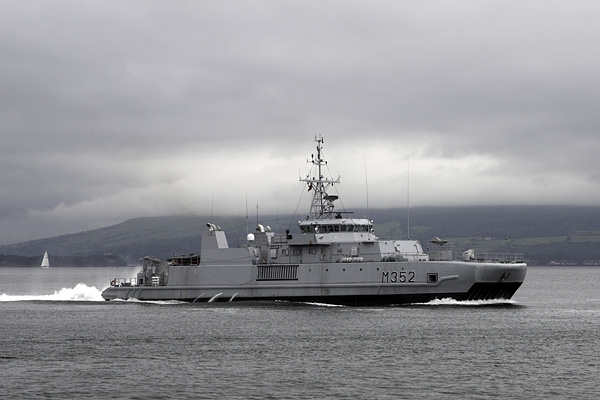
HNoMS Rauma (M352), an Alta-class minesweeper

- Alta-class minesweeper (1996):
  - Otra M351
  - Rauma M352

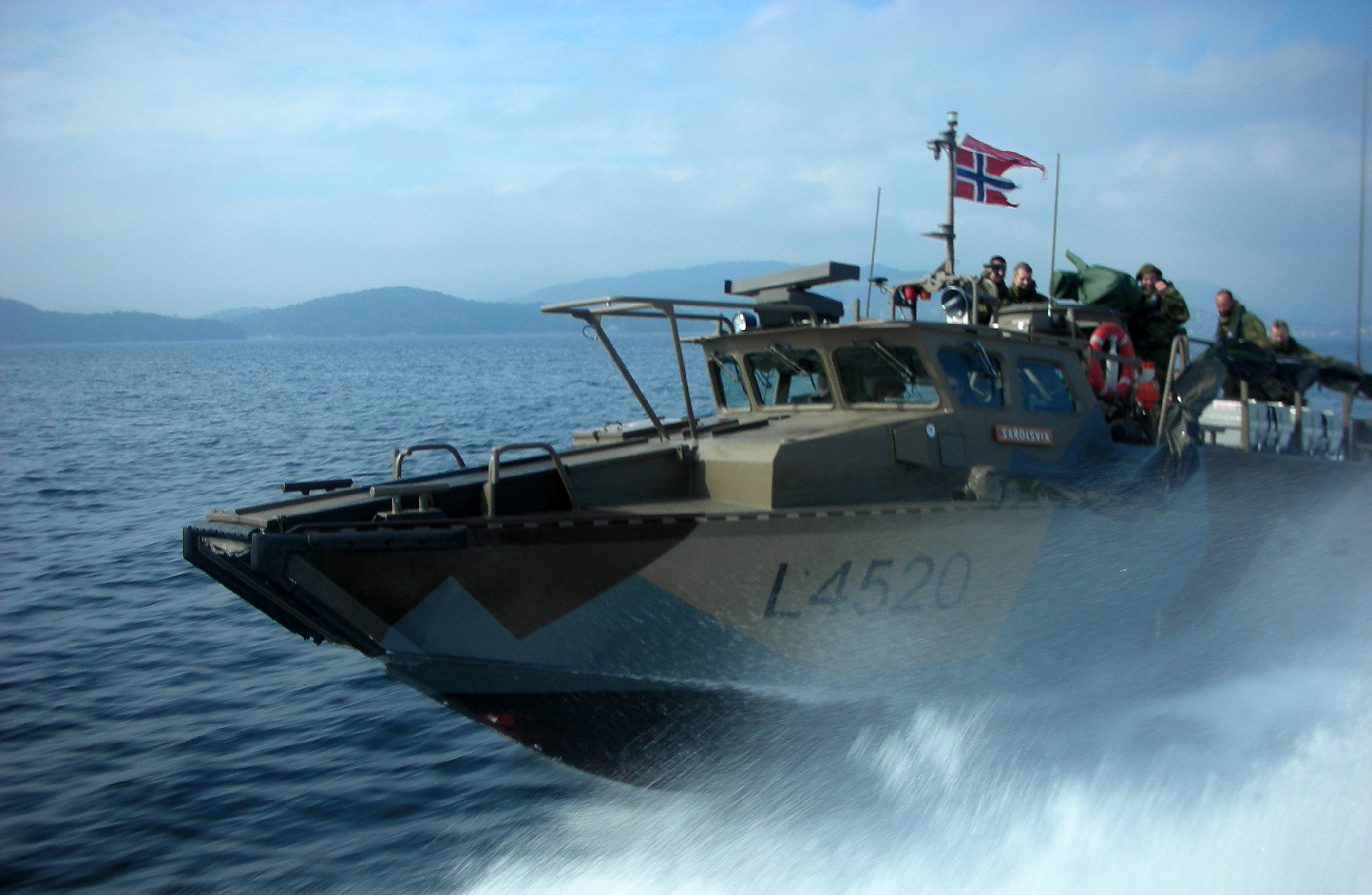
HNoMS Skrolsvik (L4520), a Combat Boat 90N

=== Coastal Ranger Command ===
- Tactical Boat Squadron
  - Combat Boat 90N (1996)
    - Trondenes
    - Skrolsvik
    - Kråkenes
    - Stangnes
    - Kjøkøy
    - Mørvika
    - Kopås
    - Tangen
    - Oddane
    - Malmøya
    - Hysnes
    - Brettingen
    - Løkhaug
    - Søviknes
    - Hellen
    - Osternes
    - Fjell
    - Lerøy
    - Torås
    - Møvik

=== Fleet Logistics Command ===
- Supply/underway replenishment ship Maud (A530). Acquired in November 2018 and first "maiden deployment" initiated in September 2021.

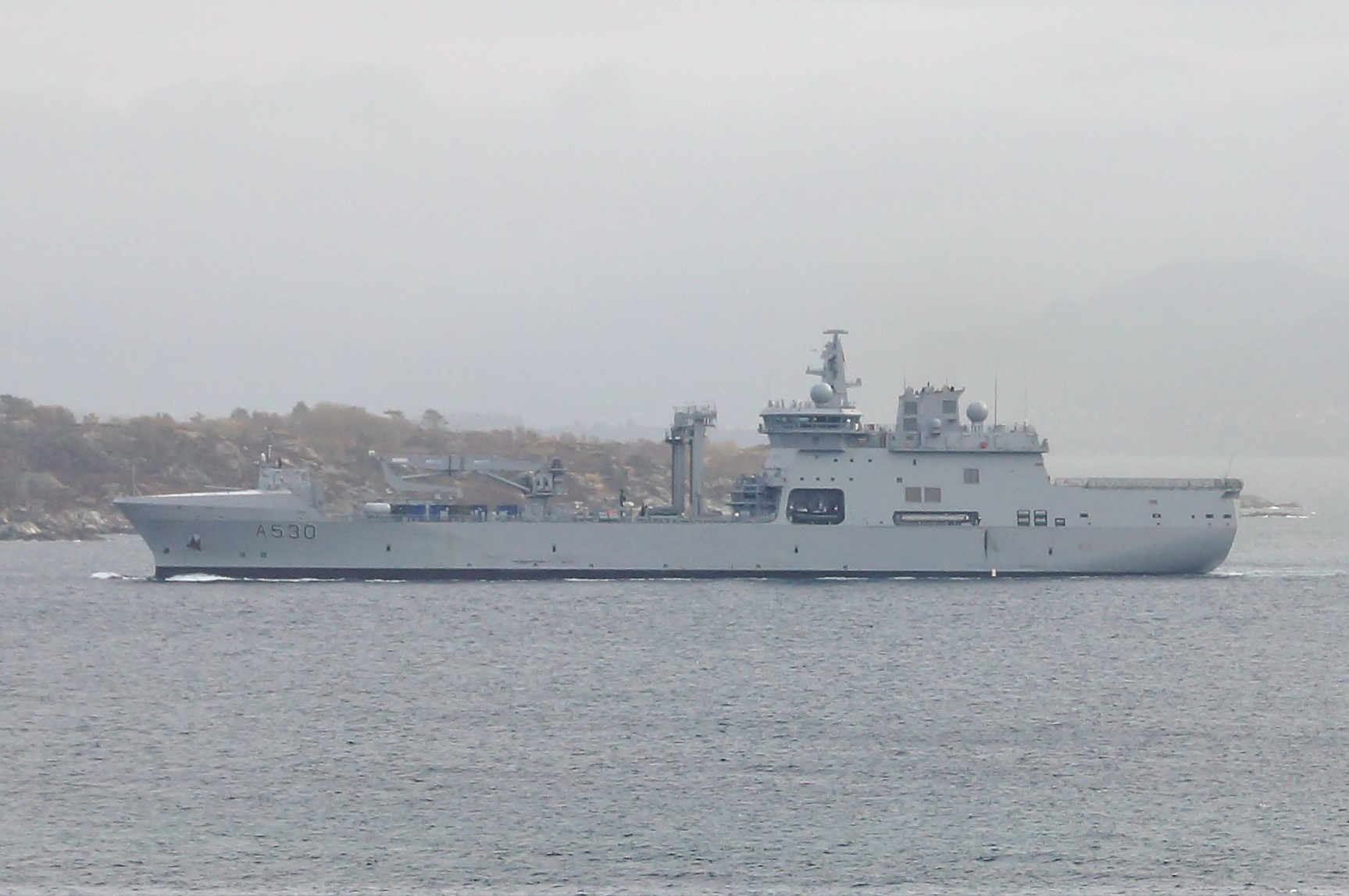
HNoMS Maud

- Royal yacht:
  - Norge (A553)
- Reine-class patrol vessels:
  - Magnus Lagabøte (A537)
  - Olav Trygvasson (A536)

== Coast Guard units and vessels ==
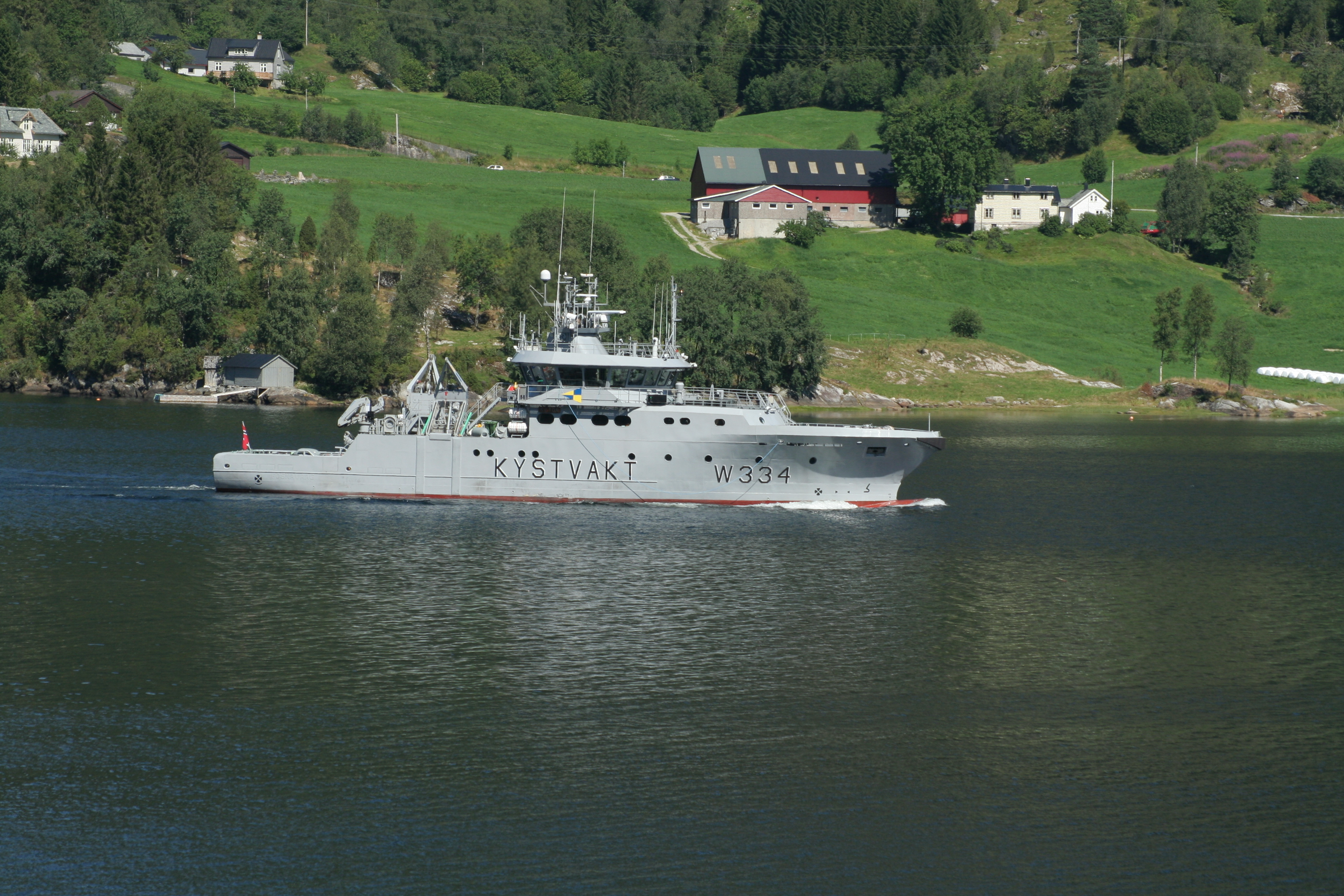
NoCGV Tor (W334 KYSTVAKT)

- Jan Mayen
- Bjørnøya
- Harstad
- Svalbard
- Barentshav
- Sortland
- Bergen
- Nornen
- Njord
- Tor
- Heimdal
- Farm

== Future vessels ==
Norway has prioritized replacing its current submarine fleet. In February 2017 the German manufacturer Thyssen Krupp was selected to deliver four new submarines, of the Type 212CD submarine-class design, starting in the latter 2020s to replace the Ula-class boats. A firm build contract with Thyssen Krupp was anticipated in the first half of 2020 as part of a joint program under which Norway will procure four submarines and Germany two. However, as of the end of 2020 a contract had not yet been signed. In March 2021 it was indicated that an agreement had been reached between Norway and Germany to initiate the acquisition program, pending approval by the Bundestag. The contract was signed in July 2021 and construction of the first vessel began in September 2023. Delivery of the first boat to the Royal Norwegian Navy is anticipated in 2029.

The Coast Guard is replacing its existing Nordkapp-class vessels with significantly larger ice-capable ships, each displacing just under 10,000 tonnes. The three new Jan Mayen-class ships are armed with a 57mm main gun and are capable of operating up to two medium-sized helicopters. The ships have an overall length of 446 feet with a beam of 72 feet and a draft of 20 feet. The maximum speed is 22 knots with more than 60 days endurance and the complement is up to 100 people. The first ship, KV Jan Mayen, was launched by the Vard Tulcea shipyard in Romania in 2021 and towed to the Vard Langsten shipyard in Tomrefjord for completion. She was christened in November 2022, having started builder's sea trials in October. The ship was delivered in early 2023. The second ship of the class, KV Bjørnøya, was transferred to Norway for her final fit out at the Vard Langsten yard in February/March 2022 and was delivered in November 2023. The third and final ship of the class, KV Hopen, was transferred to Norway for her final fit out in January 2023.

In early 2023 it was announced that the Navy was seeking a new class of coastal Ranger commando vessels to replace the CB90-class vessels. To be procured under Project P6380, the vessels are to have a top speed of 45 knots, stay at sea for up to a week and hold a crew of up to six personnel along with a coastal ranger platoon, its equipment or, alternatively, a UAV under 150kg for day/night operations. Deliveries are envisaged between 2026 and 2028. Two Special Forces Combatant Craft Medium (CCM) vessels are also to be procured from US shipbuilder ReconCraft.

From 2024, the Navy will begin to procure a new mine countermeasures capability based on autonomous systems. As part of the development of this capability, two "motherships" for autonomous systems will be acquired.

The 2020 Norwegian defence plan envisages the replacement of the current major surface vessels "after 2030". Decisions concerning type and number of vessels are to be "made in the next planning period".

In August 2025, Norway announced it had chosen the UK as its strategic partner to acquire new frigates, as part of a £10 billion agreement to purchase 5 Type 26 frigates. It is described as Norway's largest defence investment to date. The frigates will form a combined fleet of 13 anti-submarine warfare frigates (8 British and at least 5 Norwegian) to operate jointly in northern Europe. Delivery of the frigates is planned to start from 2030.

== Insignia ==
Commissioned officer ranks

The rank insignia of commissioned officers.

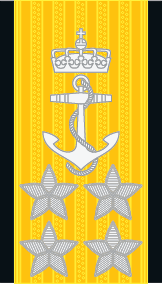
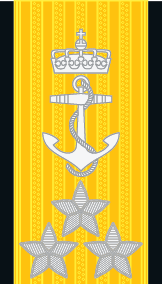
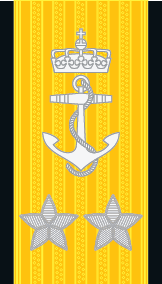
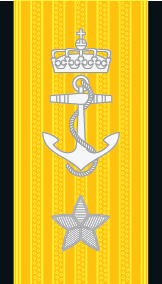
NATO code	OF-10	OF-9	OF-8	OF-7	OF-6	OF-5	OF-4	OF-3	OF-2	OF-1
Royal Norwegian Navy
Royal Norwegian Navy		Admiral	Viseadmiral	Kontreadmiral	Flaggkommandør	Kommandør	Kommandørkaptein	Orlogskaptein	Kapteinløytnant	Løytnant	Fenrik

Other ranks

The rank insignia of non-commissioned officers and enlisted personnel.

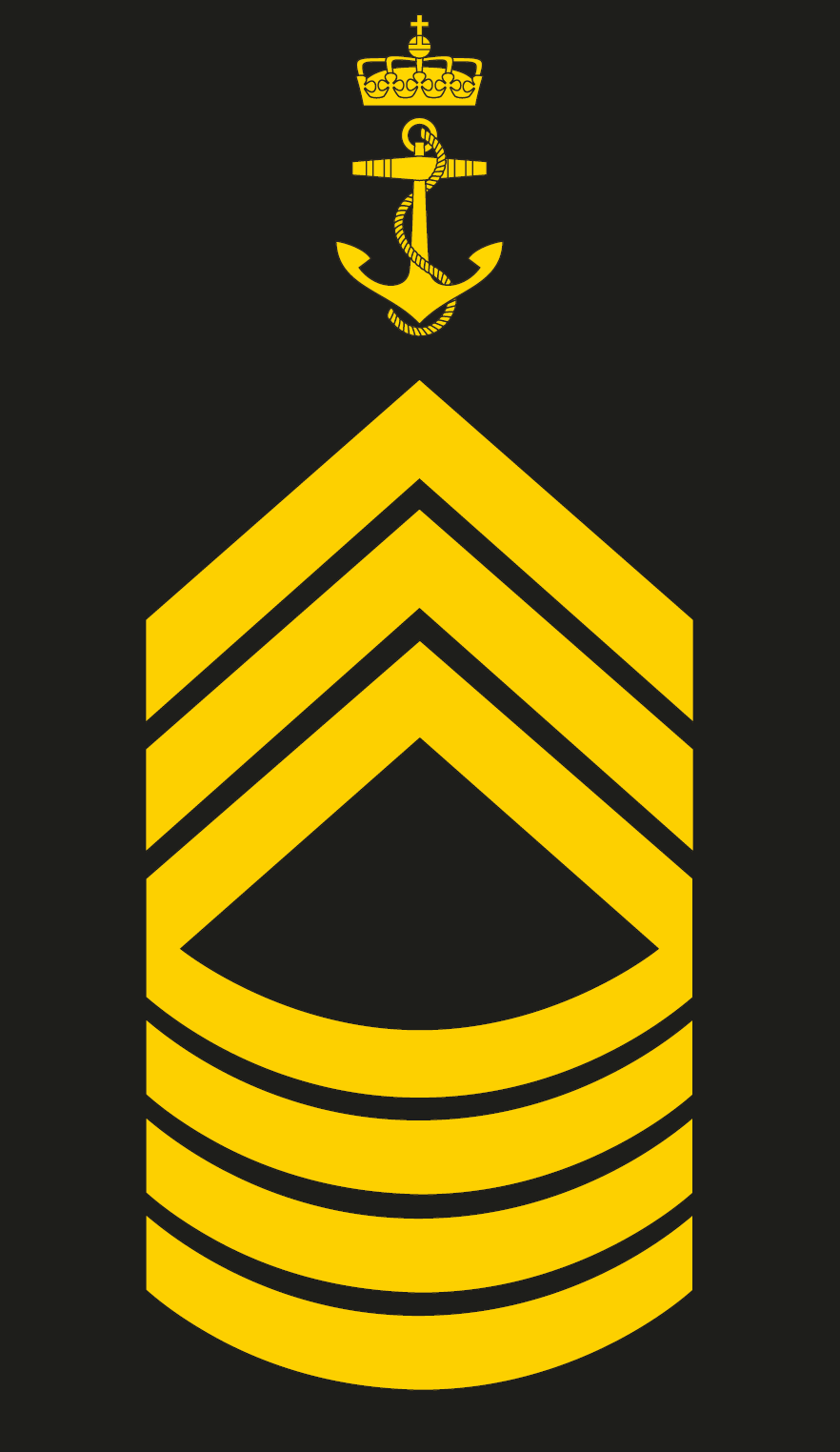
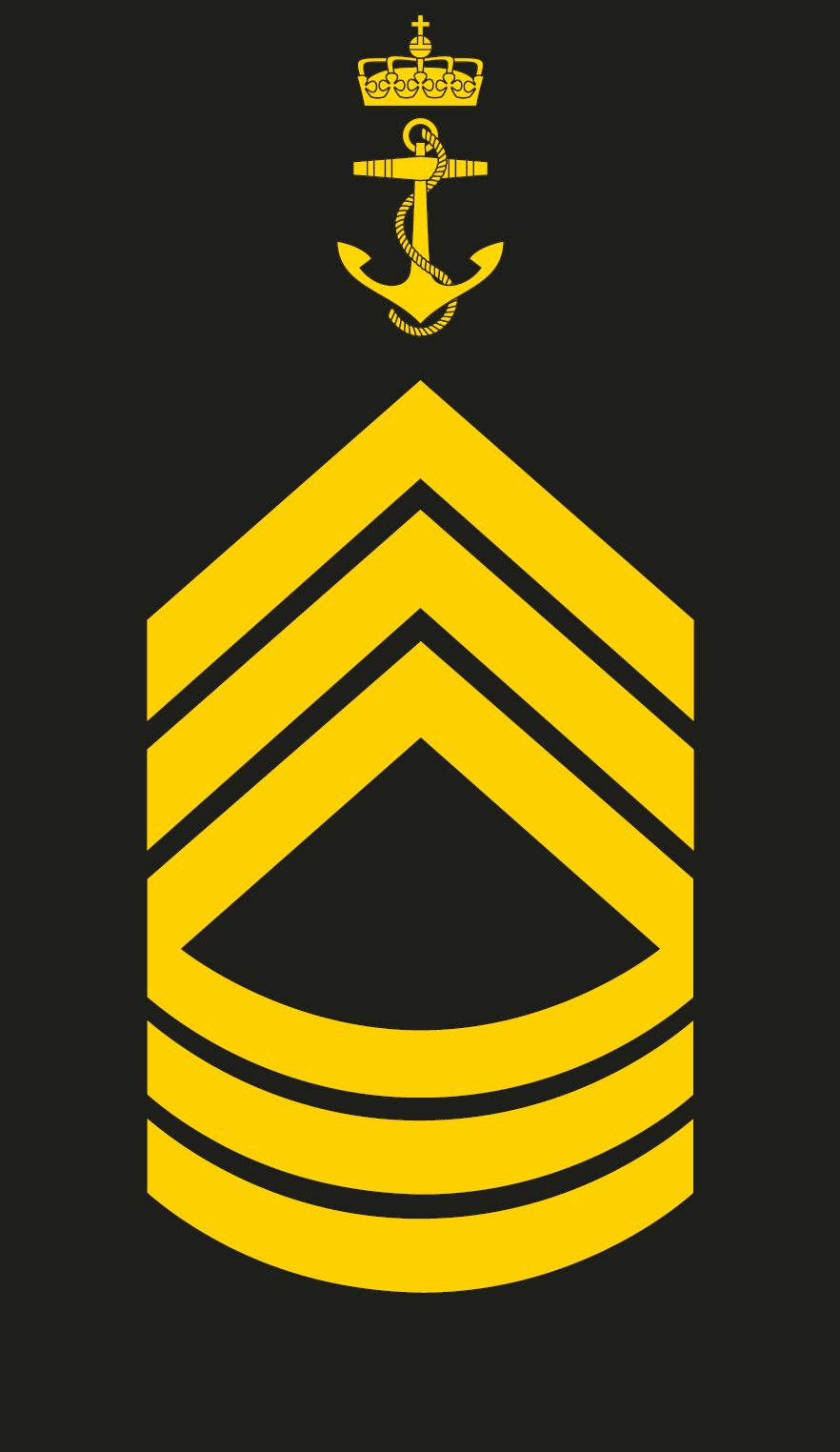
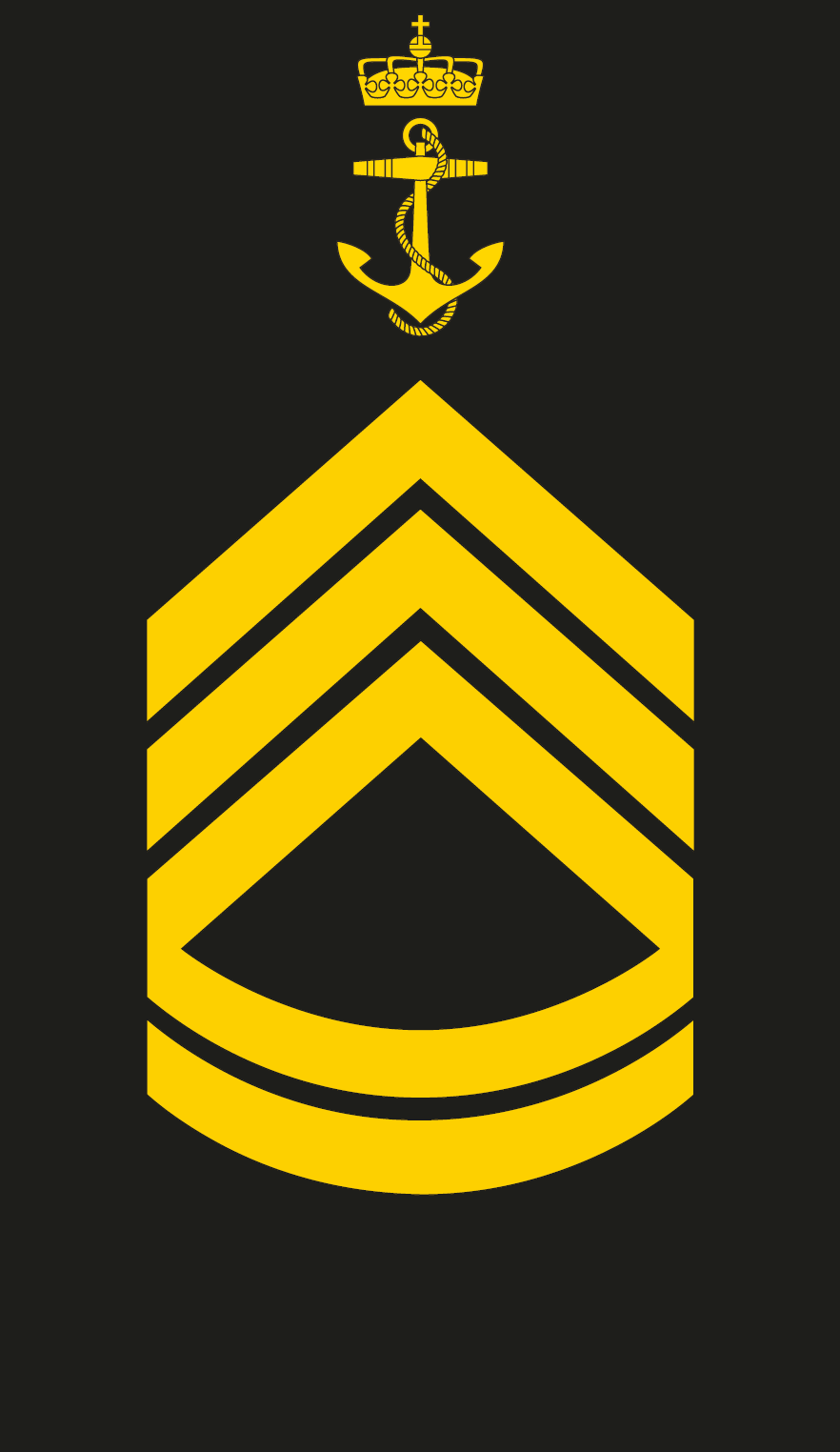
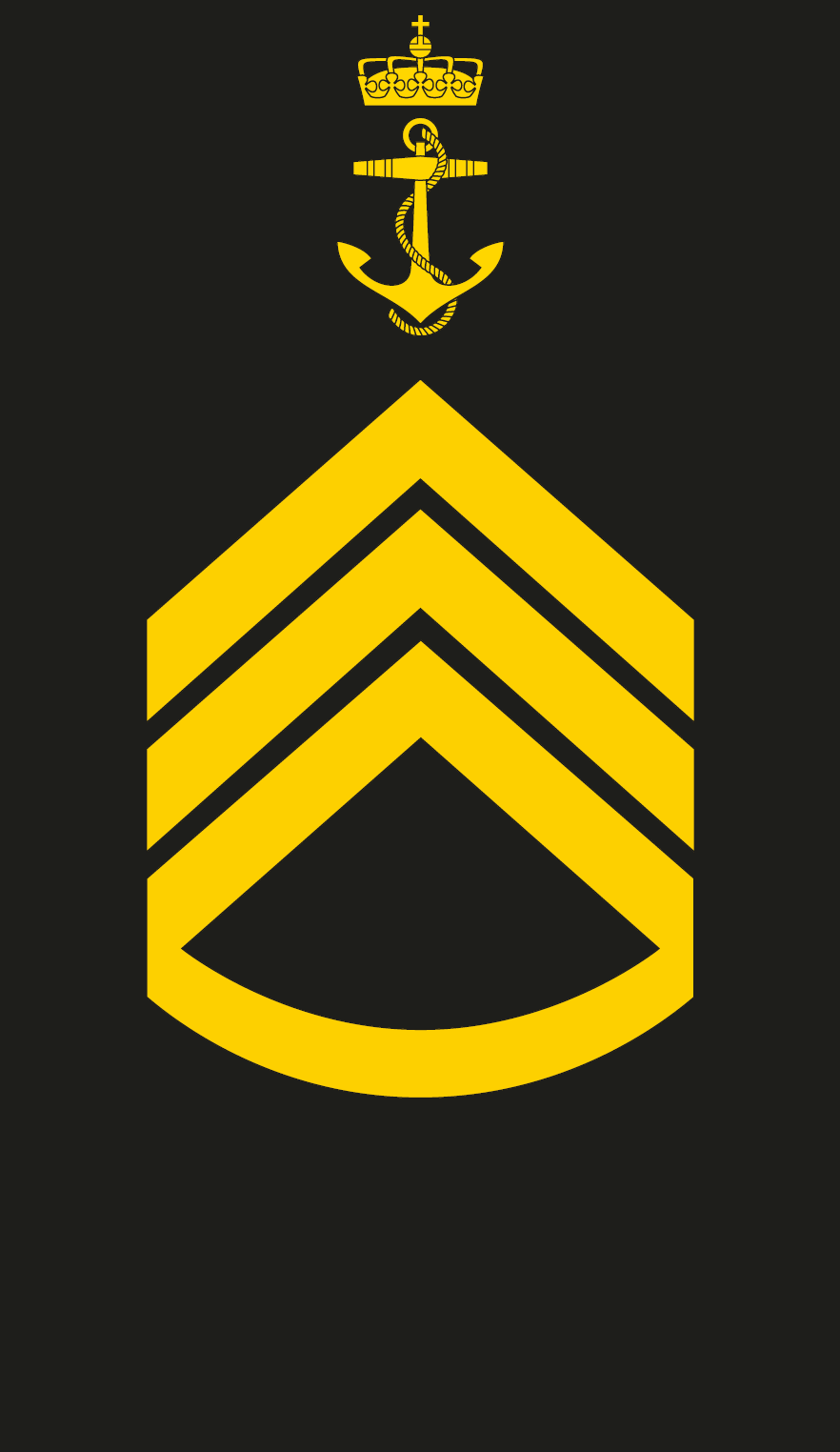
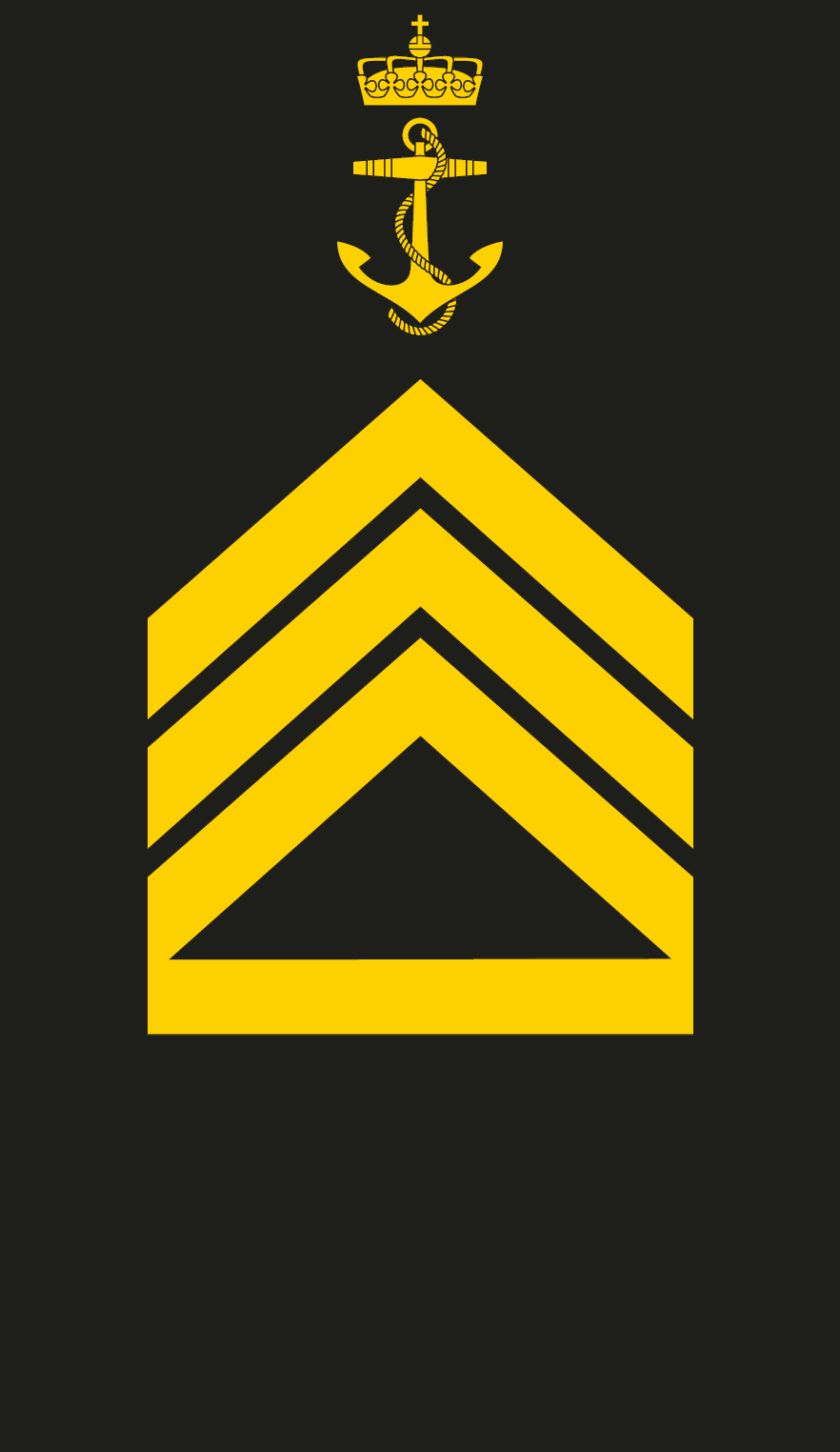
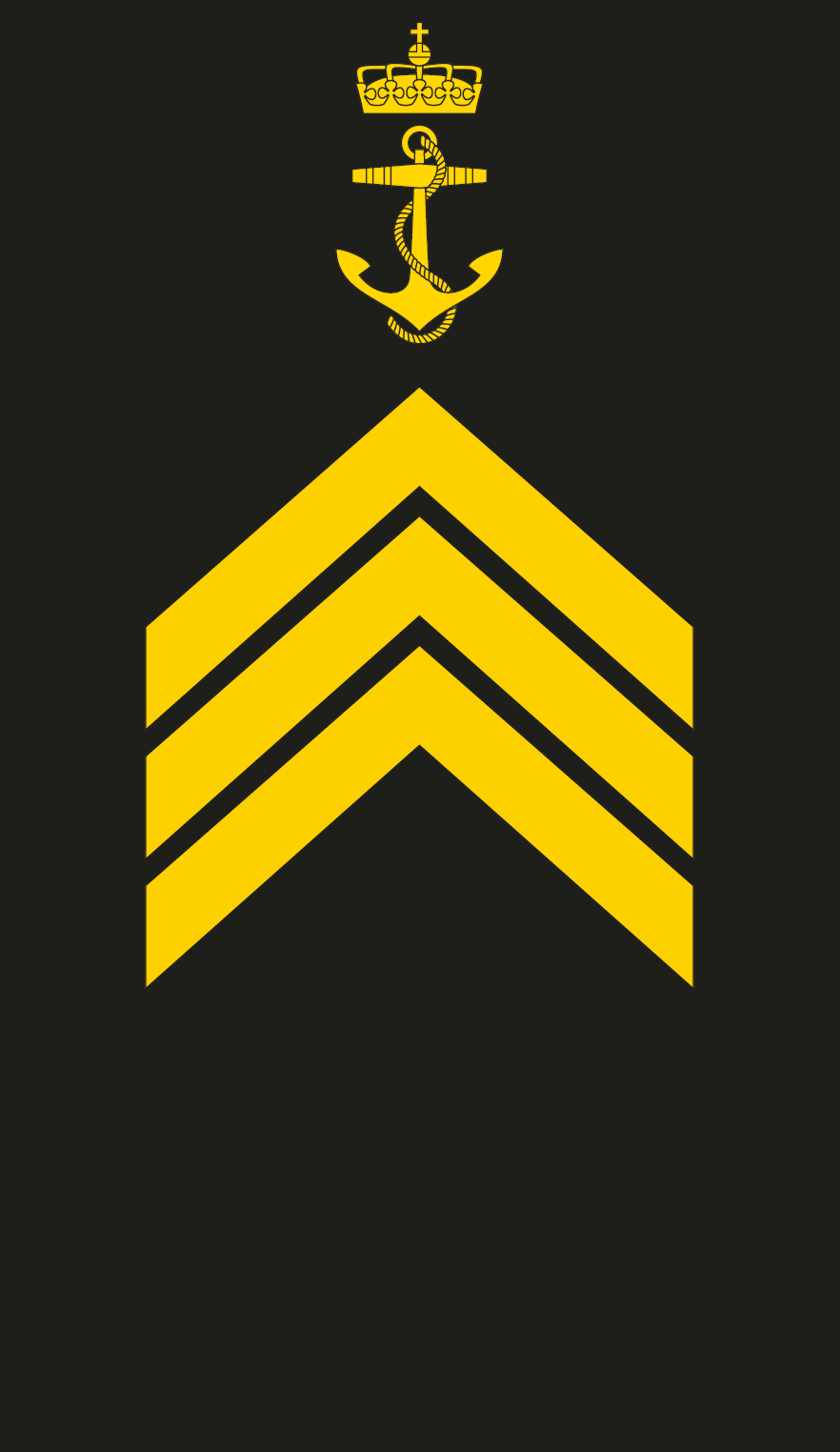
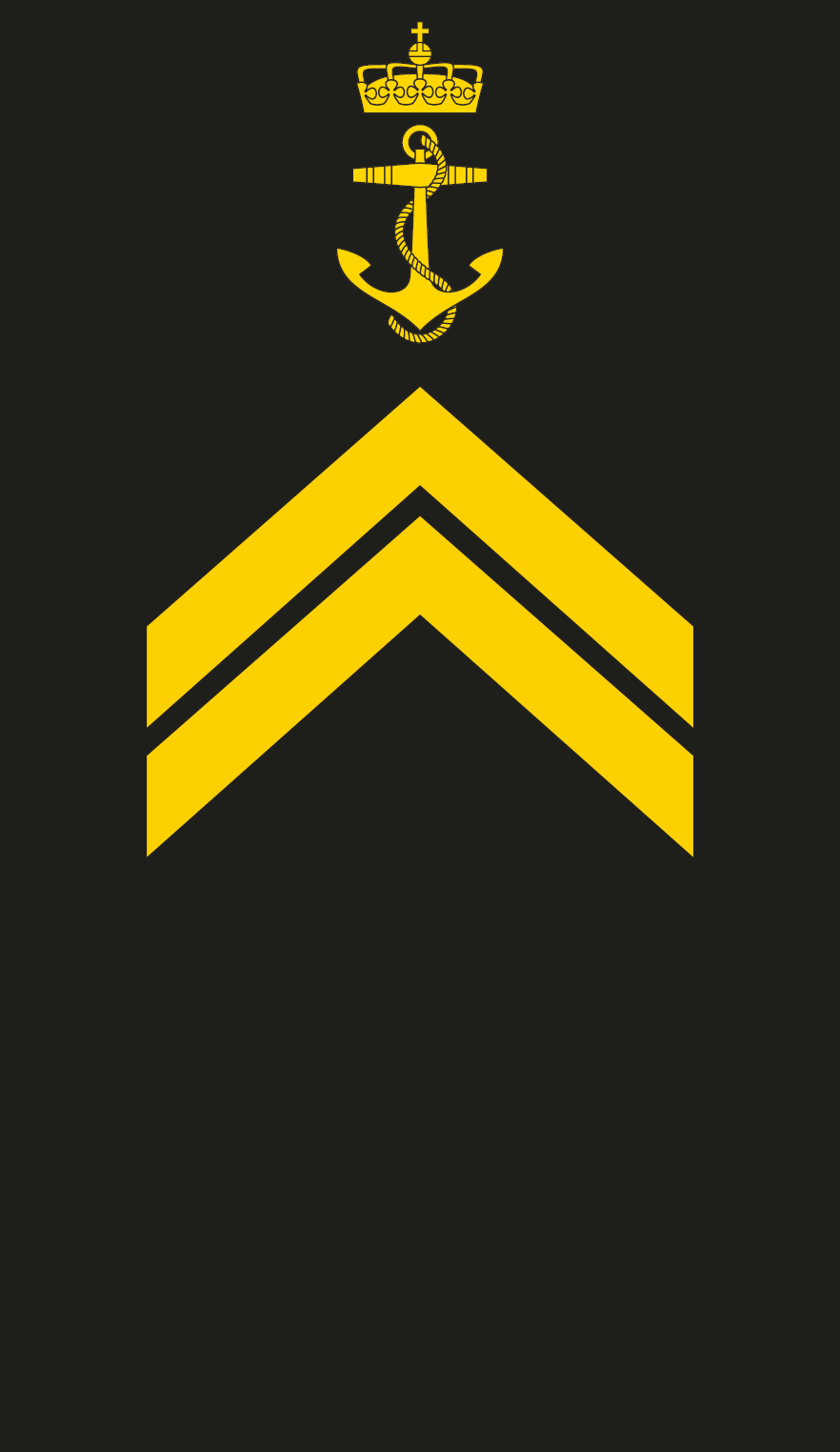
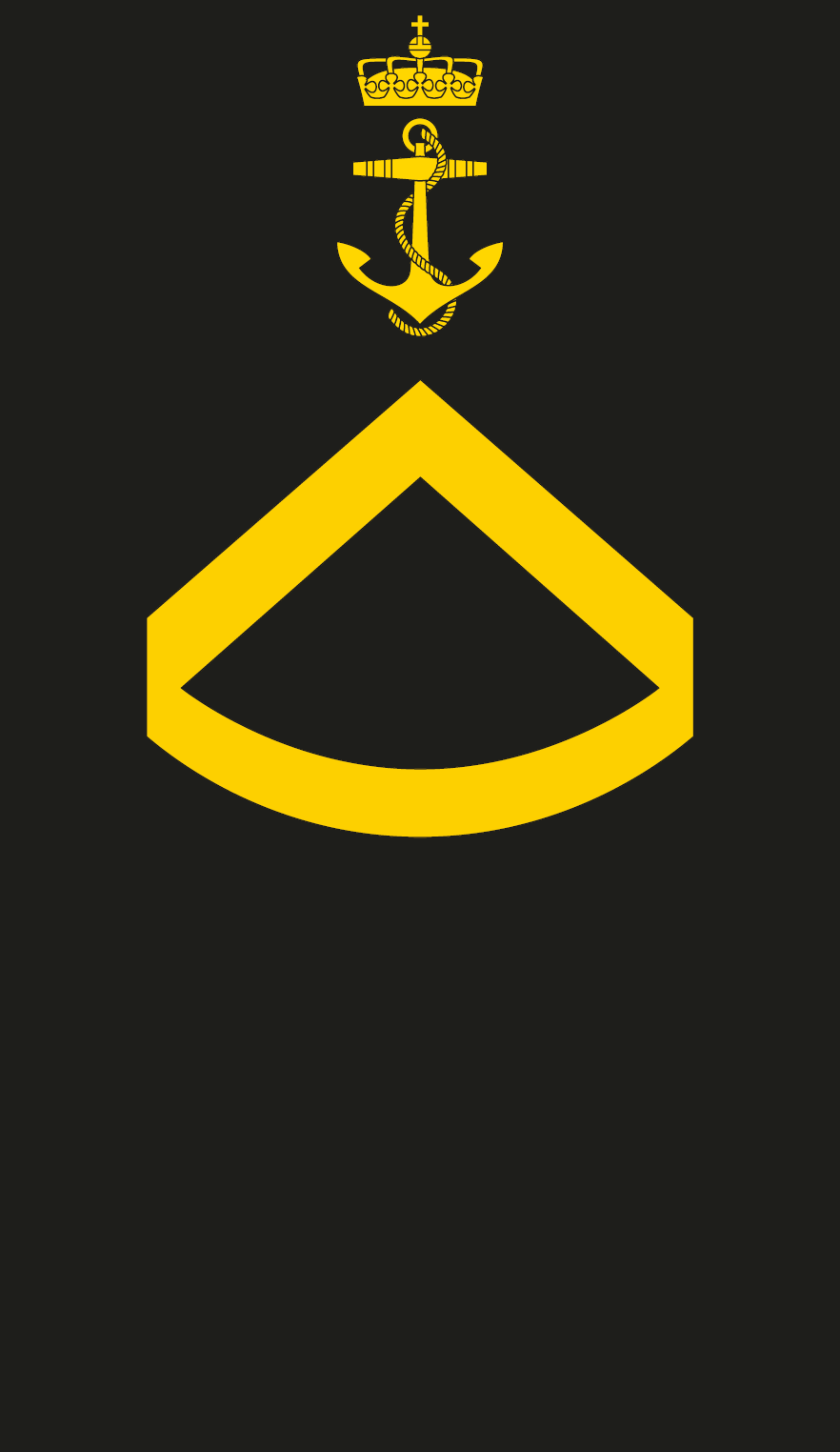
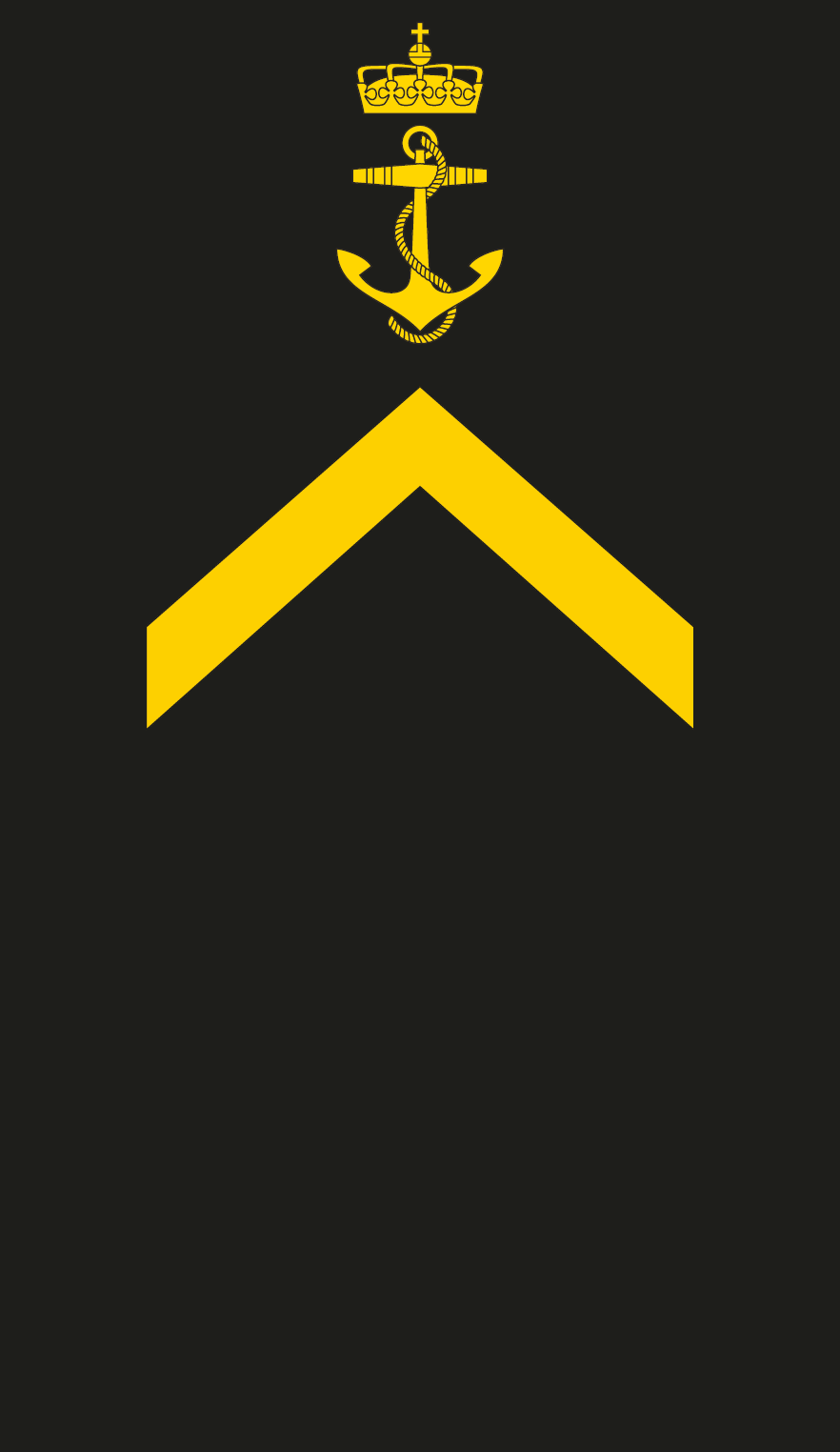
NATO code	OR-9	OR-8	OR-7	OR-6	OR-5		OR-4	OR-3	OR-2	OR-1
Royal Norwegian Navy
Royal Norwegian Navy	Flaggmester	Orlogsmester	Flotiljemester	Skvadronmester	Senior kvartermester	Kvartermester	Konstabel	Senior visekonstabel	Visekonstabel	Ledende menig	Menig

== See also ==
- List of Royal Norwegian Navy ships
- Free Norwegian Forces
