= Kampfgeschwader 4 =

- Active: 1939–1945
- Country: Nazi Germany
- Branch: Luftwaffe
- Type: Bomber unit
- Role: Tactical and Direct Ground Support.
- Size: Air Force Wing
- Nickname: General Wever
- Patron: Walther Wever
- Equipment: Dornier Do 17; Heinkel He 111; Heinkel He 177; Junkers Ju 88
- Engagements: Polish Campaign; German invasion of Denmark (1940); Norwegian Campaign; Battle of the Netherlands; Battle of Belgium; Battle of France; Battle of Britain; German invasion of Yugoslavia; Battle of Greece; Battle of Crete; Anglo-Iraqi War; Eastern Front

Insignia
- Identification symbol: Geschwaderkennung of 5J

Kampfgeschwader 4 "General Wever" (KG 4) (Battle Wing 4) was a Luftwaffe bomber wing during World War II. The unit was formed in May 1939. The unit operated the Dornier Do 17, Junkers Ju 88 and Heinkel He 111 medium bombers, with later service on the Heinkel He 177 heavy bomber. The wing was named after General Walther Wever, the prime pre-war proponent for a strategic bombing capability for the Luftwaffe, who was killed in an aircraft accident in 1936.

== History ==
Stab/KG 4 and I./KG 4 were formed on 1 May 1939 at Erfurt and was initially equipped with the He 111 Ps, borrowed from KG 253. The unit spent most of the summer training and recruiting personnel from the flight schools.

== Operational history ==
=== Invasion of Poland ===
On 25 August the unit was transferred to Langenau under the Command of Luftflotte 4. It began the Polish Campaign attacking airfields and railway yards. Stab/KG 4 was withdrawn on 20 September. I./KG 4 attacked airfields at Dęblin and Kraków on 1 September and again on 2 September. From 3–6 September rail targets in Eastern Poland were attacked, and between 6–9 September bridges along the Vistula River and in Warsaw itself were bombed. From 6–14 September rail targets were again bombed. Troop concentrations became the main targets after this until the Polish surrender. II./KG 4 also supported 10.Armee over Kutno in mid September. After the campaign the unit began training in night flying and began to lay mines of the Norwegian coast in January 1940, in preparation for the Norwegian Campaign. III./KG 4 participated in the Battle of the Bzura in which the Polish Army was surrounded and destroyed (largely by the Luftwaffe).

=== Invasions of Denmark and Norway ===
In December 1939 III./KG4 transferred from Nordhausen to Vechta and commenced intensive training for night flying and minelaying operations, while conversion to the Junkers Ju 88 began in February-1940. On 1 February 1940 KG 4 transferred to Quakenbrück in northern Germany. II./KG 4 were part of the bomber fleet that flew a "demonstration of strength" raid over Copenhagen on 9 April 1940. The unit attacked rail and airfield targets as well as anti-shipping strikes. A Staffel of Ju 88s of III./KG 4 attacked the airfield at Sola Air Station near Stavanger and sank the Norwegian destroyer Æger near Stavanger on 9 April.

=== Battle of the Netherlands and France ===
KG 4 commanded by "Geschwaderkomodore" "Oberst" Martin Fiebig helped neutralise Dutch air power on 10 May 1940 by striking at airfields and Dutch AA positions and airlifted supplies to the Fallschirmjäger units in the Netherlands. Three Heinkels 111 leading an attack on Waalhaven-airport, Rotterdam in the early morning of May 10 belonged to "Stabsstaffel". Ca. 30 planes followed. After the German bombing, First Lieutenant P.Noomen of Dutch 3 JaVa took off as patrol commander in a Fokker G.I.A-311 armed with eight machineguns and managed to hit the leading, middle Heinkel 111 (5J+DA) flown by pilot Hlubeck and commanded by "Oberst" Fiebig. It tried to escape by flying lowly back northward over the Northsea. It was subsequently downed by famous Dutch pilot G. Sonderman flying his Fokker G-1 after he had successfully hit and downed both a German Junkers Ju 52 and a Messerschmitt. After the quick surrender of the Dutch, KG 4 shifted its attention to Belgium. During the Battle of France KG 4 helped paralyse Allied rail networks across Belgium. KG 4 also flew sorties over Dunkirk. The II Gruppe also took part in the bombing of Rotterdam. After the Belgian capitulation on 3 June KG 4 took part in Operation Paula striking at airfields in and around Paris to destroy the remaining units of the Armée de l’Air. By 5 June French aerial resistance, while never effective and sporadic, ceased.

‘Fall Rot’ (Operation Red), the second phase of the conquest of France was launched on 5 June 1940. From 5–19 June, KG 4 attacked harbours and rail targets around Dieppe, and then military columns retreating through the Loire valley and the Tours area. After the French surrender on 25 June 1940 the unit was ordered to Soesterberg, the Netherlands in July 1940, to begin operations over Great Britain.

=== Battle of Britain ===
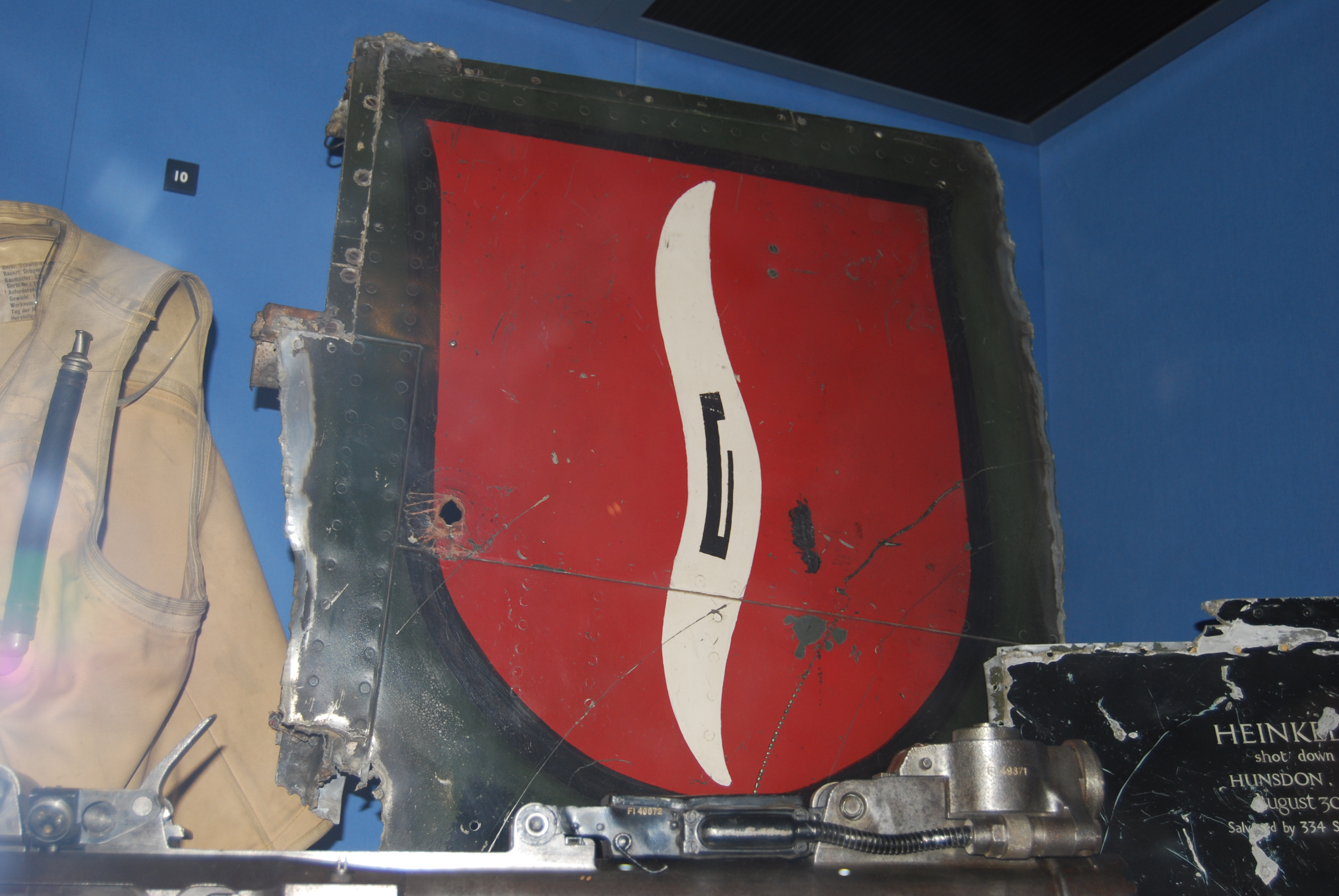
Remains of a Heinkel 111 of Kampfgeschwader 4 shot down during the Battle of Britain over Hunsdon Herts, England, August 30, 1940.

Before the French campaign was over, KG 4 struck at British ports and targets in Wales. On the night of 18/19 June KG 4 lost six Do 17s and He 111s, including Major Dietrich von Massenbach, Kommandeur of II./KG 4, who was shot down over Norfolk by a Blenheim of 23 squadron flown by Flt Lt Duke-Woolley, He 111 5J+DM crash landed on the beach at Cley Next the Sea, where the entire crew were taken prisoner.

On 4 September II./KG 4 had 37 He 111s (30 serviceable). II./KG suffered light losses during this period, due to flying at night. III./KG 4 had 25 Ju 88s on strength with 23 serviceable on 13 August 1940. By 4 September that had shrunk to 14 combat ready out of a total of 30 machines, due to losses.

The Battle of Britain was a costly failure. KG 4 had operated a minelaying unit along the British coast and participated in the Blitz and the raids on Coventry on the night of the 14/15 November. Bombing missions continued until February 1941, when III./KG 4 transferred to Gerbini, Sicily.

=== Balkans Campaign and Mediterranean theatre ===
On 29 March 1941 the unit relocated to Wien-Aspern in Austria to begin operations over Yugoslavia and Greece for the coming Balkans Campaign. During the Yugoslavian invasion, II./KG 4 participated in the bombing of Belgrade, with 25 He 111s (out of 28 serviceable) on 6 April 1941. II. Gruppe mined the waters off Alexandria and the Suez Canal. A detachment, 4.staffel, under the command of Hauptmann Schwanhauser, was sent to Iraq to support pro-Axis Iraqi forces during the Anglo-Iraqi War.

On 6 April 1941 III./KG4 bombed and mined Piraeus harbour, sinking several vessels and damaging the harbour installations. On 11 April elements of III./KG 4 attempted to lay mines at the entrance to Volos harbour. High-scoring RAF ace S/L “Pat” Pattle of No. 33 Squadron attacked the units involved and shot down a Ju 88 of III./KG 30 and a Ju 88A-5 ‘4D+FS’ of 8./KG 4.

=== Eastern Front ===
Stab. KG 4 supported Army Group North during its advance to Leningrad. In January 1942 the unit relocated to Pskov. On 22 January 1942 it helped drop supplies to the Kholm Pocket, and in February–March it flew supply missions over the Demyansk Pocket suffering heavy losses. I. Gruppe was committed to supporting Army Group Centre II. Gruppe began its aerial offensive over the city on 1 October. During the winter the unit also flew bombing raids over Moscow. II. Gruppe supported Army Group South and its offensive into the Ukraine. II. Gruppe flew its 10,000th sortie on 9 March 1943. A notable success occurred on 14 March when the Gruppe attacked a Soviet airfield around Kursk destroying 40 enemy machines and damaging 23 others. II. Gruppe also flew strategic bombing missions, against the Tank factory at Gorky and missions against the rubber factories near Yaroslavl. III. Gruppe was committed to the Southern wing of the front and managed to hit targets over Astrakhan. In October 1943 the unit was partially equipped with the Heinkel He 177A to perform heavy bomber missions. In the period 1943-45 the Kampfgeschwader covered the continuous retreat of the Wehrmacht until the end of the war, in the tactical and supply role. On 8 May 1945 the unit surrendered to British forces.

== Organisation ==
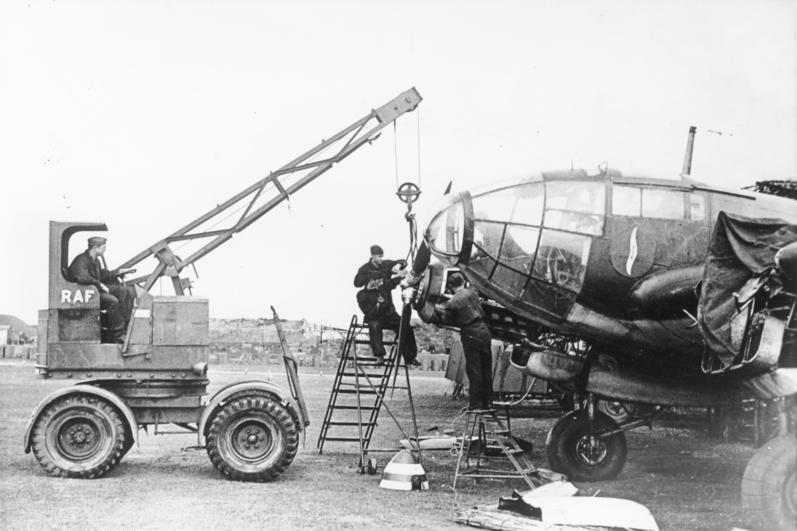
Heinkel He 111 of the Kampfgeschwader 4 (KG 4) "General Wever"

Stab.

Formed 1 May 1939. Disbanded 8 May 1945.

I. Gruppe

Formed 1 May 1939, exchanged identities with I./KG 100 10 October 1943, then became III./KG 1 on 31 May 1944.

II. Gruppe

Formed 1 May 1939

III. Gruppe

Formed on 1 May 1939

IV(Erg). Gruppe

Formed on 18 June 1940. Dissolved on 15 August 1944

14. Staffel

Formed mid-October 1942. Disbanded in January 1943.

== Commanding officers ==
- Oberst Martin Fiebig, 1 September 1939 - 10 May 1940
- Major Reinhard Graubner, 4 December 1944 - 8 May 1945

== See also ==
- Kampfgeschwader 100, with whom KG 4 swapped some units and aircraft (1943–45).
