= List of military aircraft of Norway =

List of military aircraft of Norway consists of the aircraft of Royal Norwegian Air Force, established in 1944 with the amalgamation of the Royal Norwegian Navy Air Service and the Norwegian Army Air Service, both of which were established in 1912.

Below is a list of aircraft used by the Norwegian Air Forces throughout their history. The majority of aircraft before 1940 were built in Norway while the majority of aircraft used after 1940 were built either in the United Kingdom or the United States.

== Aircraft used by the Air Force and its predecessors ==
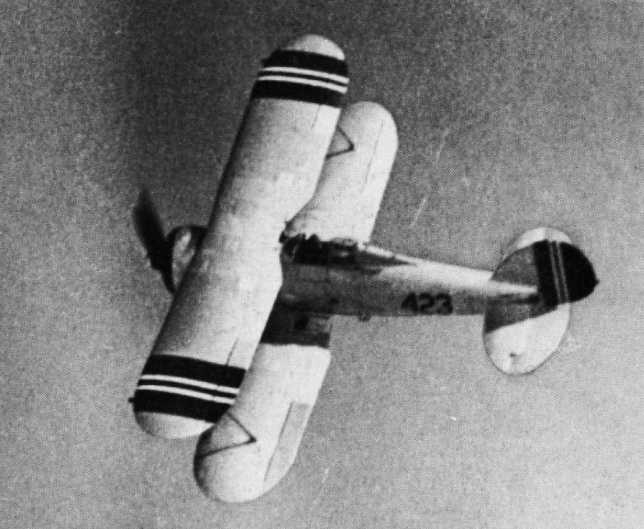
Gloster Gladiator 423 in 1938-1940

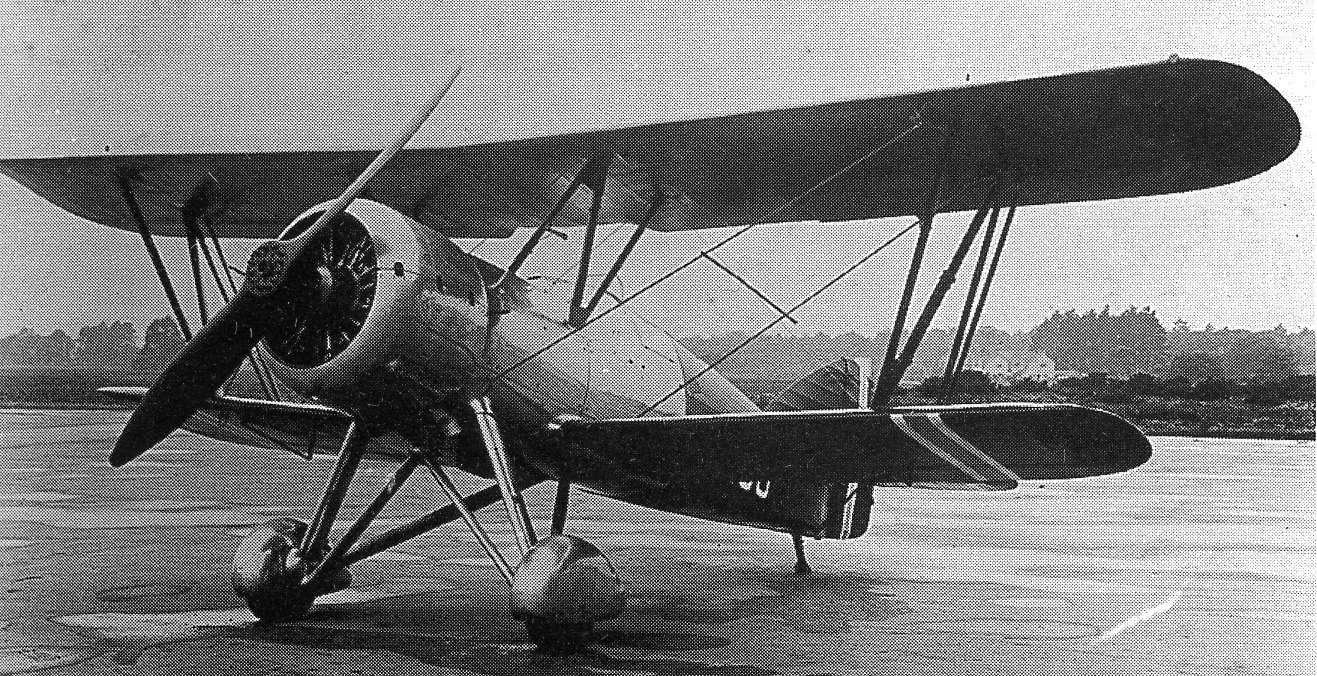
Armstrong Whitworth Scimitar

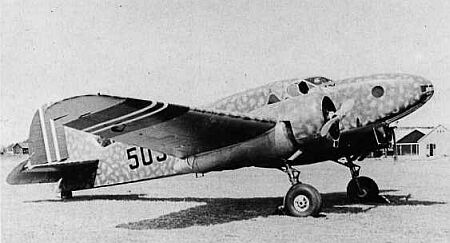
One of the four Norwegian Caproni Ca.310s c. 1939

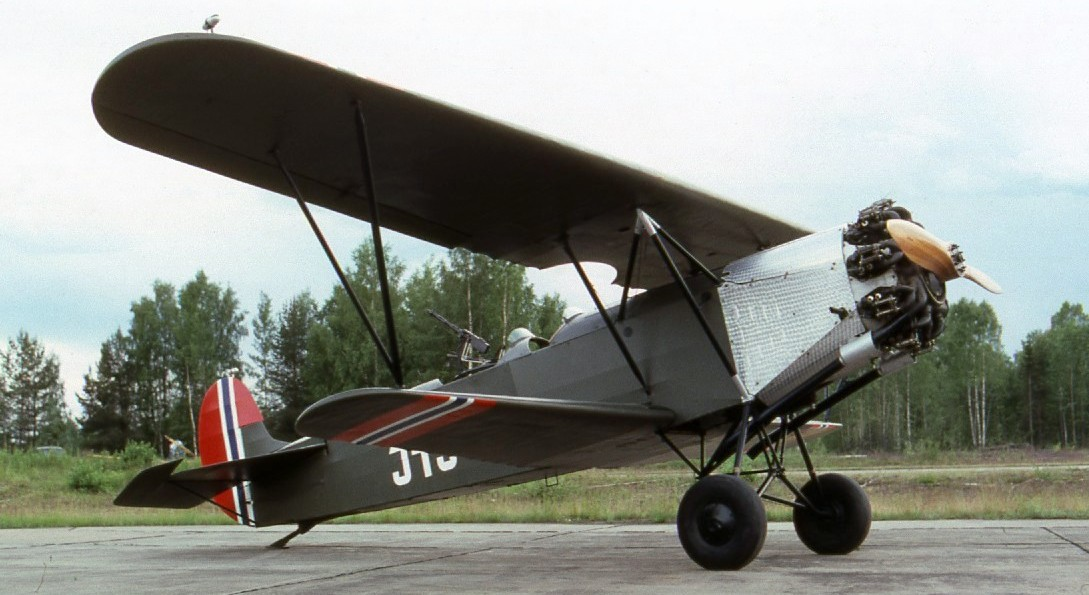
Norwegian Army Air Service Fokker CV-D photographed in 1990

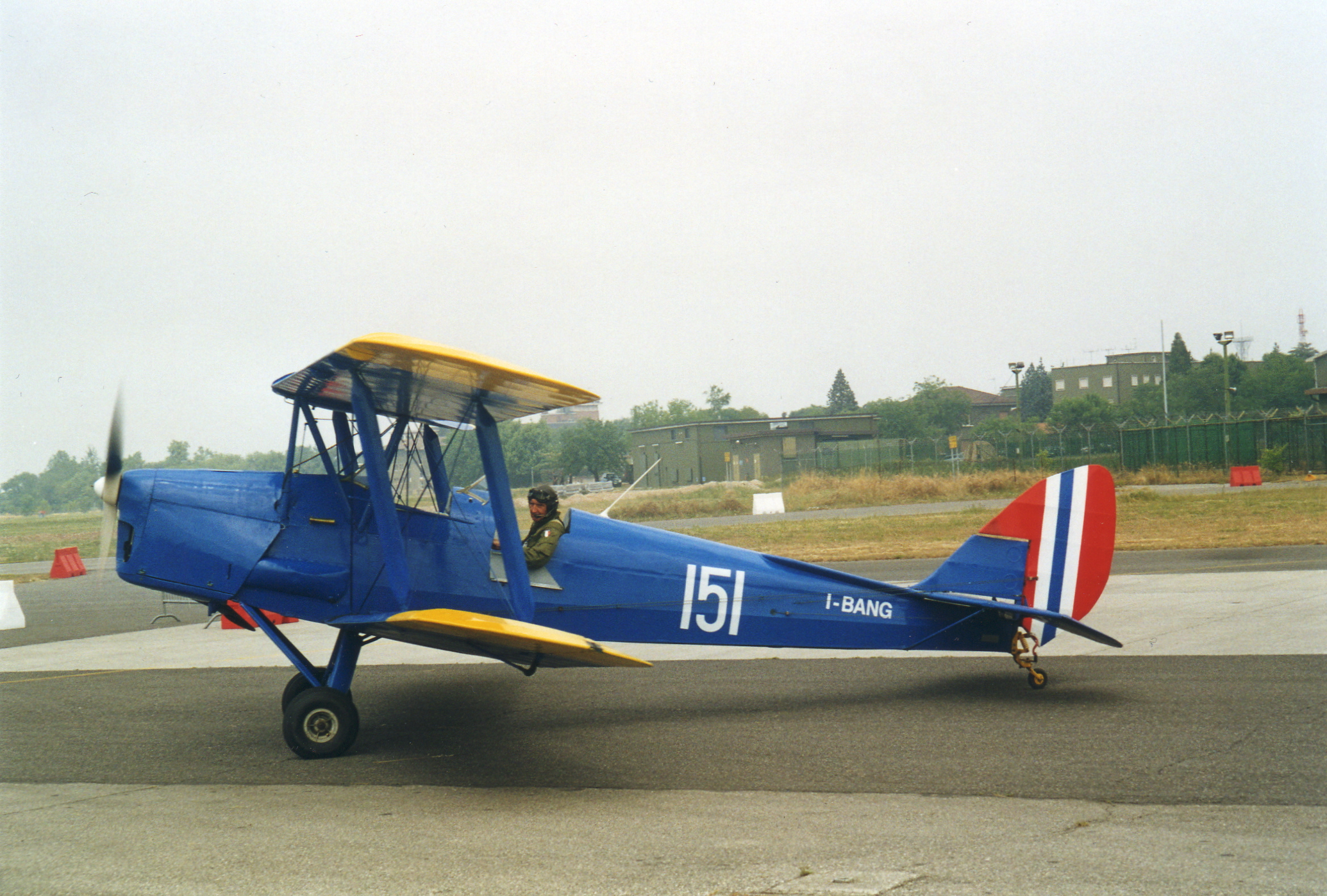
Tiger Moth in Norwegian markings, 24 June 2001

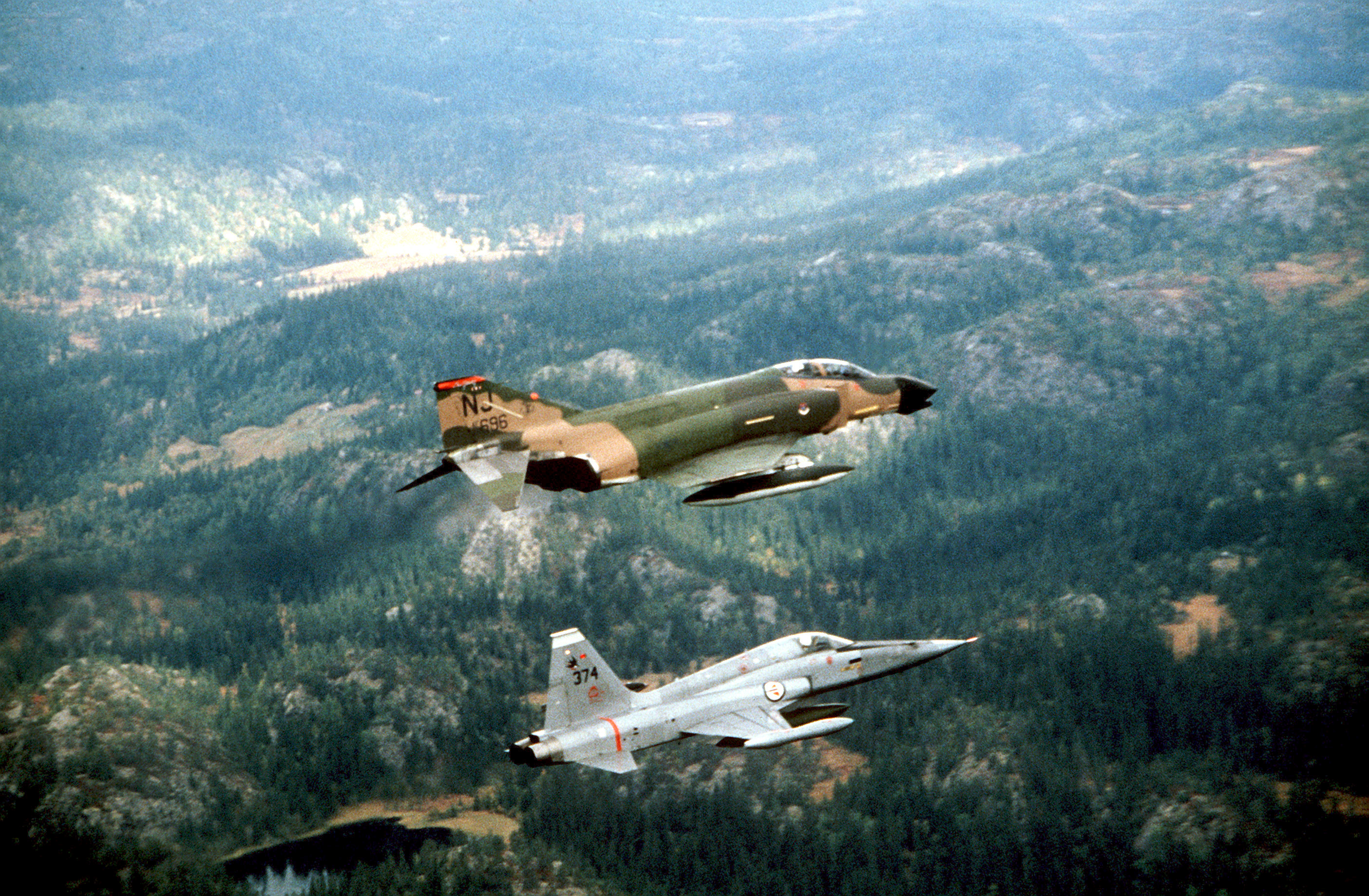
Royal Norwegian Air Force F-5A Freedom Fighter aircraft flying in close formation with a New Jersey Air National Guard F-4 Phantom II aircraft during an exercise in 1982.

Type	# in use	Period	Notes
Royal Norwegian Navy Air Service
Rumpler Taube	1	1912-1922	Start, with first flights 1 and 7 June 1912, the first aircraft of the Royal Norwegian Navy Air Service that was established in 1916.
Maurice Farman S.3 Longhorn	1	1914	Roald Amundsen was originally a gift from Roald Amundsen to the Norwegian Army Air Service, but was lent to the Royal Norwegian Navy Air Service
Marinens Flyvebaatfabrikk MF.1	6	1915-	
Marinens Flyvebaatfabrikk MF.2	3	1916-1924	
Marinens Flyvebaatfabrikk MF.3	4	1917-1924	
Sopwith Baby	18	1917-1931	
Marinens Flyvebaatfabrikk MF.4	7	1918-	Some MF.1s were rebuilt to MF.4 to bring the number to seven
Marinens Flyvebaatfabrikk MF.5	8	1918-1926	
Nielsen & Winther	1	1918	
Supermarine Channel I	5	1920-1923	
Lübeck-Travemünde F.4	2	1920-1924	Last flight 1924, scrapped 1927 and 1930
Marinens Flyvebaatfabrikk MF.6	2	1921-1927	
Savoia S.13	1	1921-1928	Gift
Hansa Brandenburg W.33	30	1922-1935	
Marinens Flyvebaatfabrikk MF.7	2	1923-1931	
Marinens Flyvebaatfabrikk MF.8	2; 8B: 2	1924-1934; 1930-1939*	
Douglas DT-2B/C	8	1925-1940	Single example delivered by Douglas, the rest built under licence by Marinens Flyvebaatfabrikk.
Marinens Flyvebaatfabrikk MF.9	15	1926-1932	
Marinens Flyvebaatfabrikk MF.10	4	1929-1940	
Marinens Flyvebaatfabrikk MF.11	29	1932-1940	Three aircraft interned in Finland were used by the Finns until 1944
Breda Ba 28	4	1936-1940	Five were ordered to save an Italian-Norwegian cod fish trading deal, one crashed in Italy almost killing Finn Lützow-Holm
Marinens Flyvebaatfabrikk MF.12	1	1939	
Heinkel He 115A-2	6+2	1939-1943	Six delivered in 1939, plus two captured from the Luftwaffe after the invasion. An order for a further six were placed, but the aircraft were not delivered by 9 April 1940. The last of the delivered aircraft were scrapped in Woodhaven in 1943. Four aircraft served with RAF, one served in Finland
Junkers Ju 52	1	1940	Hauken was rented from DNL from January 1940 until the invasion 9 April
Arado Ar 196A	1	1940	Interned near Kristiansund 8 April 1940, taken into Norwegian service the following day. Destroyed in landing accident in Glasgow later in April 1940
Norwegian Army Air Service
Maurice Farman S.3 Longhorn	3	1912-1925	Ganger Rolf and Njaal were bought with funds from Norsk Luftseiladsforening. Olav Trygvassøn was a gift with a clause; it was to be stationed in Trøndelag. Specified in 3 rows below.
Maurice Farman MF.7	(1)	1912-1925	Ganger Rolf, built at Heradsbygd south of Elverum in 1912 with Norways first military flight 1 September 1912, one of the first two aircraft of the Royal Norwegian Air Force.
Maurice Farman MF.7	(1)	1912-1925	Njaal, built at Kjeller airport with first flight at Kjeller 21 September 1912, one of the first two aircraft of the Royal Norwegian Air Force.
Maurice Farman MF.7	(1)	1914-1925	S.3, trainer donated by Roald Amundsen in 1914 and transferred to Royal Norwegian Navy Air Service.
Bleriot XI	1	1914-1915	Tryggve Gran's Nordsjøen
Hærens Flyvemaskinfabrikk FF.1			Einar Sem-Jacobsen visited Maurice Farman in France, but could not get the drawings for the aircraft he saw there, so he drew FF.1 from memory
Hærens Flyvemaskinfabrikk FF.2			Based on FF.1
Hærens Flyvemaskinfabrikk FF.3 Hydro	4	1917-	Based on a Farman Sem-Jacobsen had obtained drawings of.
Farman F.40	XL II: 2 LX: 10	1916-1917; 1917-1922	
Royal Aircraft Factory BE.2e	15	1917-1925	
Avro 504	5	1918-1930	The last, delivered in 1922, was a gift from Roald Amundsen.
Hærens Flyvemaskinfabrikk FF.4	2		Five planned, but prototype was a failure. An improved version did not fare much better, and both were soon withdrawn from service and sold at an auction
Hærens Flyvemaskinfabrikk FF.5 (T.1)	T.1: 1 T.1B: 6 T.1C: 11	1918; 1919- 1921-1924	T.1, based on BE.2e, was a failure. T.1B, based on Avro 504 got into use, but was no success.
Farman F.46	2	1920-1922	
Hærens Flyvemaskinfabrikk FF.6 (T.2)	1	1921	Five planned, but the prototype turned out to be a failure; the test pilot refused to go up again after the first test flight. Scrapped 1922
Bristol F.2 Fighter	5	1921-1930	
Hærens Flyvemaskinfabrikk FF.7 Hauk	14	1923-1929	Hannoversche Waggonfabrik's CL.V built under licence
Hærens Flyvemaskinfabrikk FF.8 Måke	Måke I: 2 Måke II: 7 Måke III: 4	-1928; 1921- 1928-	Hansa Brandenburg W.29 built under licence, Måke I and II by Norsk Aerofabrik, Måke III by HF
Hærens Flyvemaskinfabrikk FF.9 Kaje			
Fokker C.V.D	27	1931-1940	All built under licence by Hærens Flyvemaskinfabrikk
Fokker C.V.E	20	1930-1940	Five delivered by Fokker, the rest built under licence by HF
de Havilland DH.60 Moth	13	1930-1940	Three second-hand aircraft bought from de Havilland, 10 built under licence by HF
de Havilland DH.82 Tiger Moth	38	1933-1940	All built under licence by HF
Cierva C.30A	1	1935-1936	Gift, sold after a year, hardly used
Svenska Aero J6B Jaktfalk	1	1932-1936	One Jaktfalk and One Fury bought for a fly-off for the next Norw. fighter
Hawker Fury I	1	1933-1936	
Armstrong Whitworth AW35 Scimitar	4	1936-1940	40 projected built under licence by HFF, project abandoned when Scimitar was not selected by RAF
Gloster Gladiator	Mk.I: 6 Mk.II: 6	1937-1940; 1940	
Caproni Ca.310	4	1938-1940	Bought in a dried and salted cod deal. In addition, two Ca.312 were ordered in the spring of 1940.
Curtiss 75A-6	19	1940	19 from an order of 24 delivered prior to the German invasion, most still in crates. Shipment with last five diverted to UK
War years: Little Norway, squadrons in RAF and the Stockholm Element
Hawker Hurricane			331 Sqdn
Supermarine Spitfire			331 & 332 Sqdn
Auster AOP.1	9	1944-1945	132 (N.) Wing (331 & 332 Sqdn.) hack
Bristol Beaufighter I	3	1943	On loan to 333 Sqdn from 235 Sqdn
Airspeed Oxford I	2		
Northrop N-3PB	24		330 Sqdn
Fairchild M-62			Little Norway
Curtiss 75A-8	36		Little Norway
Douglas 8A-5	36		Little Norway
Interstate Cadet	2		Little Norway
Waco SRE			Little Norway
Stinson Reliant	7		Little Norway
Noorduyn Norseman IV	1		Little Norway, rented a short period
Consolidated Catalina IIIA			
Short Sunderland	Mk. III: Mk.V:		
de Havilland Mosquito			
Lockheed Lodestar			Stockholm Element
Royal Norwegian Air Force 1945-
Agusta-Bell 47J/J-2; Bell 47D-1; G-3	5; 6; 3	1958-1967; 1953-1971; 1954-1970	
Airspeed Oxford I/II	22	1947-1953	
Avro Anson I	10	1947-1951	
Bell UH-1B	37	1963-1990	
Bell 412SP	18	1987-	
Cessna L-19A (O-1A)	27	1960-1992	
Consolidated Catalina	IV A: (3); IV B: 12; PBY-5A: 6	1945-1946; 1945-1954; 1954-1961	
Dassault Falcon 20	3	1972-	
de Havilland Canada DHC-3 Otter	10	1953-1968	
de Havilland Canada DHC-6 Twin Otter	5	1967-2001	
de Havilland Mosquito	T.III: 3 FB VI: 19	1947-1952; 1945-1952	
de Havilland Vampire	T.55: 6 F.III: 20; FB 52: 36	1952-1955; 1948-1957; 1949-1957	
Douglas C-47A	7; 10	1945-1946; 1950-1974	
Douglas C-53D	3	1945-1946	
Fairchild M-62	74	1945-1957	
Fairchild C-119G Flying Boxcar	8	1956-1969	
Fiesler Fi 156 Storch	30	1945-1954	
General Dynamics F-16 Fighting Falcon	A: 60; B: 14	1980-2022; 1980-2022	Original order of 74 aircraft built under licence by Fokker mainly being (block 15 and 20 but, earlier on block 1, 5 and 10), two attrition aircraft from GD. most jets were upgraded to the OCU and later on MLU upgrades. On 6 January 2022, Norway announced that all F-16s had been retired.
Grumman HU-16B (ASW) Albatross	18	1961-1969	
Junkers Ju 52/3m	18	1945-1951	
Lockheed C-56B/C-60A Lodestar	7	1945-1950	
Lockheed C-130E/H Hercules	6	1969-2008	
Lockheed C-130J Super Hercules	5	2008-	
Lockheed F-104 Starfighter; Canadair CF-104	F-104G: 24; TF-104G: 4 CF-104: 21; CF-104D: 3	1963-1981; 1963-1983; 1973-1983; 1973-1983	
Lockheed Martin F-35 Lightning IIA	49	2016-	52 F-35As planned in total.
Lockheed P-3 Orion	B: 5 C: 4 N: 2	1969-1989; 1989- 1980-	
Lockheed T-33A	22	1953-1968	
MFI 15 Safari	18	1981-	
Noorduyn Norseman IV/VI	24	1945-1959	
North American Harvard II/IIB/SNJ3/4	39	1945-1956	
North American F-86 Sabre	F-86F: 115; F-86K: 64	1957-1967; 1955-1967	
Northrop N-3PB	2	1945-1956	
Northrop F-5 Freedom Fighter	A: 98; B: 14; RF-5A: 16	1966-2000; 1966-2000; 1969-2000	
Piper L-18C	16	1955-1992	
Republic F-84 Thunderjet	F-84E: 6 F:84G: 200; RF-84F: 35	1951-1956; 1952-1960; 1956-1970	
SAAB 91B/B-2 Safir	30	1956-1988	
Short Sunderland Mk V	(11)	1945	
Sikorsky H-19D-4	4	1958-1967	
Supermarine Spitfire	LF.IXe: 73; PR XI: 3	1945-1952; 1946-1954	
Westland Lynx Mk.86	6	1981-2014	
Westland Sea King Mk.43/43B	12	1971-	To be replaced by AW101
Focke-Wulf Fw 189A-2	1	1945-1946	
Messerschmitt Bf 108 Taifun	2	1945	
Junkers W 34	1	1945-1946	
AW101 SAR Queen	16	2020-	All 16 delivered to Norway by June 2025
