= Kristian Østby (aviator) =

Norwegian naval aviator

Kristian August Østby
- Born: 29 January 1900
- Died: 11 June 1981 (age 81)
- Occupation: Military aviator

Kristian August Østby (29 January 1900 – 11 June 1981) was a Norwegian naval aviator.

== Early years ==
Østby attended the Norwegian Naval Flying School from 1924, graduating in 1925. He soon became an instructor, then test pilot at Marinens Flyvebaatfabrikk.

== Military career ==
=== World War II ===
The Marinens Flyvebaatfabrikk M.F.12 (sometimes known as the Høver M.F.12, after its designer) was a seaplane built in Norway in 1939 as a military trainer aircraft to replace the Royal Norwegian Navy Air Service's aging fleet of M.F.8 trainers. In 1939, Østby was the factory's control officer and also responsible for introducing the Heinkel He 115 torpedo bombers ordered by the RNNAS.

With Captain Birger Motzfeldt of the Norwegian Army Air Service, Østby was instrumental in the purchase of aircraft from the United States just prior to the German invasion of Norway in 1940. Norway had recognised that the equipment of its armed forces was obsolete, and sent a purchasing commission to the United States in February 1940, including a Royal Norwegian Navy Air Service contingent headed by Cmdr. Østby. Amongst the requirements the commission hoped to fill was to replace the Royal Norwegian Navy Air Service's M.F.11 biplane patrol aircraft.

After visits to many of the aviation companies, Østby determined that only one manufacturer had both a design, company designation Model 8-A and available production capacity, Northrop Aircraft Incorporated. The commission ordered 24 floatplanes renamed the Northrop N-3PB "off the drawing board" (literally, the aircraft being ordered prior to the type having flown) from Northrop on 8 March 1940, at a total cost of 6,550,000 kr to meet this requirement. Østby remained at Northrop as the head of the Norwegian acceptance team of 12 technical staff and flight crews who worked closely with design and production personnel at the plant. He supervised all the final fitting of equipment and participated in the flight testing of the N-3PDs at Lake Elsinore, California.

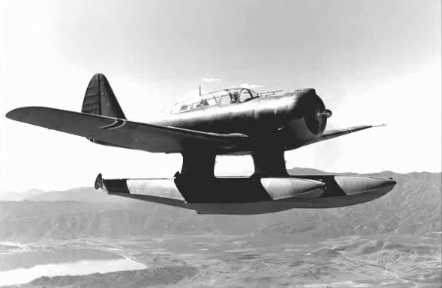
Royal Norwegian Navy Air Service Northrop N-3PB carrying out a test flight over Lake Elsinore, California, c. 1940–1941. Cmdr. Østby carried out some of the flight testing and accepted the aircraft off the production line.

When the final N-3PD production run was completed in March 1941, Østby was appointed air attaché to the Norwegian embassy in Washington. After arriving in the United Kingdom, the Norwegian government-in-exile began the process of setting up a new base of operations. A decision was swiftly made to keep the existing Norwegian pilots that had escaped to the United Kingdom, as an independent unit, consequently, none were allowed to participate in the Battle of Britain. Østby worked with Bernt Balchen, a Norwegian aviator, who enlisted with the Royal Norwegian Air Force and had come to the United States on a crucial mission to negotiate "matters pertaining to aircraft ordnance and ammunition with the question of the Norwegian government's possible purchase of such materials in the United States of America."

The Norwegian Government-in-exile in London changed to a new directive: to set up a training camp and school for expatriate Norwegian airmen and soldiers in Canada and Østby was one of the principal "architects" of the training program, helping to negotiate with Canadian government officials to obtain an agreement to use available airport facilities in Canada. Arrangements were made to transfer Norwegian pilots to a North American headquarters while various locations were considered, a base around the Toronto Island Airport in Canada was chosen. Once the base known as "Little Norway" was established, young Norwegians migrated to the site to enroll in the RNoAF in Canada.

=== Postwar ===
After the war Østby served in the Royal Norwegian Air Force in several technical positions, among others as director of Horten flyfabrikk and Kjeller Flyfabrikk. Østby retired from the Royal Norwegian Air Force in 1963 as a colonel.
