= Marinens Flyvebaatfabrikk M.F.2 =

- M.F.2

General information
- Type: Maritime reconnaissance, bomber
- Manufacturer: Marinens Flyvebaatfabrikk
- Designer: Halfdan Gyth Dehli
- Primary user: Royal Norwegian Navy Air Service
- Number built: 3

History
- Manufactured: 1916–1918
- Introduction date: 1916
- Retired: 2 October 1924
- Developed from: M.F.1

The Marinens Flyvebaatfabrikk M.F.2 was a two-seat military biplane floatplane produced by Marinens Flyvebaatfabrikk in 1915 and 1916. It was designed by naval captain Halfdan Gyth Dehli, based on former models by French designer Maurice Farman and improvements by Einar Sem-Jacobsen of the Norwegian Army Air Service's aircraft factory Kjeller Flyfabrikk.

== Background ==
The M.F.2 was the second type of aircraft manufactured by Marinens Flyvebaatfabrikk, and was financed by the extraordinary appropriations to the Norwegian Armed Forces after the outbreak of the First World War.

== Production ==
Two examples of the M.F.2 were delivered from the Marinens Flyvebaatfabrikk in the summer of 1916, with the numerals F.10 and F.12. A third example, F.10 (II), was delivered in March 1918, replacing the original F.10, which had crashed at Karljohansvern naval base on 21 April 1917 after a total of 22 hours flying time.

== Service ==
The M.F.2s were employed for neutrality protection patrols, in addition to being used for student pilots taking their certificates. The M.F.2s were based at the Royal Norwegian Navy's main naval base at Karljohansvern in Horten until July 1918, when F.10 (II) and F.12 were redeployed to the newly established naval station at Kristiansand. The M.F.2s were part of the First Aerial Group prior to the move to Kristiansand. At Kristiansand the two M.F.2s served together with three Sopwith Baby seaplane fighters, and were housed in two aircraft sheds.

The M.F.2 type served with the Royal Norwegian Navy Air Service until 2 October 1924, when F.12 was written off after 95 hours and 30 minutes of flying time. F.10 (II) had been wrecked during takeoff from Kristiansand naval air station on 22 July 1919.

The engine of the M.F.2 was a 150 hp Sunbeam V8. The aircraft was equipped with a radio transmitter. It was armed with a fixed Madsen machine gun and could carry a bomb load of 2 x 50 kg, in the form of two small bombs or mines. The M.F.2 was the first aircraft operated by the Royal Norwegian Navy Air Service that had permanent armament, or could carry a bomb load. The preceding Rumpler Etrich Taube, Maurice Farman MF.7 and Marinens Flyvebaatfabrikk M.F.1 types had only been able to carry carbines and pistols.

The wings of the M.F.2 were shorter than those of the M.F.1, and the tail section of the M.F.2 was completely different from its predecessor and included a new elevators and rudders.

== Specifications ==
Data from Marinens Flygevåpen 1912–1944

General characteristics

- Crew: 2
- Length: 9.73 m (31 ft 11 in)
- Wingspan: 15.6 m (51 ft 2 in)
- Height: 3.59 m (11 ft 9 in)
- Empty weight: 1,050 kg (2,315 lb)
- Gross weight: 1,390 kg (3,064 lb)
- Powerplant: 1 × Sunbeam 150hp V-8 water-cooled piston engine, 110–120 kW (150–160 hp)

Performance

- Maximum speed: 110 km/h (68 mph, 59 kn)
- Cruise speed: 100 km/h (62 mph, 54 kn)
- Range: 350 km (220 mi, 190 nmi)

Armament

- 1 × Madsen machine gun
- 2 × bombs or mines

|power main=150–160 hp

== Bibliography ==
- Hafsten, Bjørn; Arheim, Tom (2003). Marinens Flygevåpen 1912–1944 (in Norwegian). Oslo: TankeStreken AS. ISBN 82-993535-1-3.
- Henriksen, Vera (1994). Fra opptakt til nederlag. Luftforsvarets historie (in Norwegian). Vol. 1. Oslo: Aschehoug. ISBN 82-03-22068--1.
