= Marinens Flyvebaatfabrikk M.F.3 =

General information
- Type: Maritime reconnaissance
- Manufacturer: Marinens Flyvebaatfabrikk
- Designer: Halfdan Gyth Dehli
- Primary user: Royal Norwegian Navy Air Service
- Number built: 4

History
- Manufactured: 1917
- Introduction date: 1917
- First flight: 11 April 1917
- Retired: 2 October 1924

The Marinens Flyvebaatfabrikk M.F.3 was a reconnaissance floatplane built by the Royal Norwegian Navy Air Service aircraft factory Marinens Flyvebaatfabrikk in 1917. The aircraft was financed by extraordinary appropriations during the First World War and served until October 1924.

== Background ==
The M.F.3 was the last reconnaissance aircraft of the Maurice Farman type built by the Marinens Flyvebaatfabrikk. In the autumn of 1916 Captain Halfdan Gyth Dehli proposed building a series of four aircraft for reconnaissance purposes. The proposal was approved by the Commanding Admiral of the Royal Norwegian Navy on 30 October 1916 and by the Norwegian Ministry of Defence on 8 November of the same year. The production of the four aircraft was financed through the extraordinary appropriations to the Norwegian Armed Forces after the outbreak of the First World War.

== Production ==
The production of the four M.F.3 aircraft was the first to be completed solely at the Marinens Flyvebaatfabrikk and took place during 1917. The M.F.3 production marked the completion of full-scale production facilities at the factory in Horten. The factory at first had a production capacity of four aircraft per year. The four M.F.3s were given numerals between F.14 and F.20.

The M.F.3 type had a larger gondola and a more powerful engine than the earlier types used by the Royal Norwegian Navy Air Service and was considered well suited to Norwegian conditions. The powerful engine made the aircraft able to take off from ice and snow, and tests at this were carried out at the Royal Norwegian Navy's main base of Karljohansvern in Horten during the winter of 1917–1918. The M.F.3's load carrying ability also enabled the Royal Norwegian Navy Air Service to carry out its first experiments at dropping torpedoes from an aircraft. M.F.3 F.14 carried out test drops of the Royal Norwegian Navy's Type 2 and Type 3 35 cm torpedoes during the autumn of 1918. The torpedo tests carried out in 1918, and further tests in 1923, led to the Royal Norwegian Navy Air Service deciding to acquire dedicated torpedo bombers. In 1924 the Douglas DT-2B was ordered from the Douglas Aircraft Company in California.

== Service ==
The type's first flight occurred when F.14 took off on 11 April 1917. F.16 first flew on 10 May 1917, F.18 on 3 July 1917, and F.20 on 4 November 1917. All four M.F.3s flew with the First Aerial Group, operating out of Horten. F.14 left the First Aerial Group in August 1918, with the other three M.F.3s continuing to serve in the unit until 14 December 1918. None of the four aircraft were lost to accidents. F.14, F.16, and F.18 were written off on 10 February 1921 and F.20 on 2 October 1924. F.20 had suffered damages in a crash in the inner harbour of Horten on 22 September 1924.

== Specifications ==
Data from Marinens Flygevåpen 1912–1944.

General characteristics

- Crew: 2
- Length: 10.15 m (33 ft 4 in)
- Wingspan: 15.7 m (51 ft 6 in)
- Height: 3.335 m (10 ft 11 in)
- Empty weight: 1,150 kg (2,535 lb)
- Gross weight: 1,500 kg (3,307 lb)
- Powerplant: 1 × Curtiss C-6 6-cylinder water-cooled in-line piston engine, 120–130 kW (160–180 hp)
- Propellers: 4-bladed fixed-pitch wooden pusher propeller

Performance

- Maximum speed: 125 km/h (78 mph, 67 kn)
- Cruise speed: 110 km/h (68 mph, 59 kn)
- Range: 660 km (410 mi, 360 nmi)
- Rate of climb: 1.85 m/s (364 ft/min)

Armament

- 1 × Madsen machine gun
- 2 × bombs or mines

== Bibliography ==
- Hafsten, Bjørn; Arheim, Tom (2003). Marinens Flygevåpen 1912–1944 (in Norwegian). Oslo: TankeStreken AS. ISBN 82-993535-1-3.
