= Marinens Flyvebaatfabrikk M.F.10 =

M.F.10
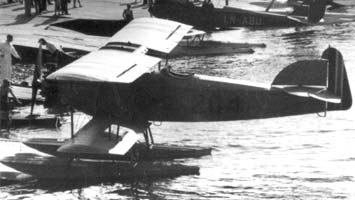
- M.F.10 F.204.

General information
- Type: Military trainer seaplane
- National origin: Norway
- Manufacturer: Marinens Flyvebaatfabrikk
- Designer: Johann E. Høver
- Primary user: Royal Norwegian Navy Air Service
- Number built: 4

History
- First flight: 7 July 1929
- Retired: 10 April 1940

The Marinens Flyvebaatfabrikk M.F.10 (also known as the Høver M.F.10, after its designer) was a military trainer seaplane built in Norway in 1929.

== Characteristics ==
It was a largely conventional biplane design derived from the M.F.9 fighter, and sharing its single-bay wings with additional struts bracing the lower wings to the fuselage sides. It differed from its predecessor in having two a second open cockpit in tandem with the pilot's, and while the prototype shared the M.F.9's wooden construction and Vee-engine, later examples had a tubular structure and a radial engine. Intended for advanced training, the aircraft was built strongly enough to allow for aerobatics and dive bombing. Having been built by the specifications from a US light dive bomber, the M.F.10 could both dive and fly on its back.

== Design and construction ==
Marinens Flyvebaatfabrikk began construction of a new trainer to replace the Hansa-Brandenburg W.33 in this role. The prototype, F.4 (V), first flew on 7 July 1929 and underwent stringent testing before moving on to the production stage. F.4 first flew with a 160 horsepower (120 kW) Mercedes engine with a top speed of 157 km/h and a climbing speed of 2,000 meters in 25 minutes. The Mercedes power plant was replaced with a Hispano Suiza model with a top speed of 185 km/h and an ability to climb 2,000 metres in less than eight minutes.

== Operational use ==
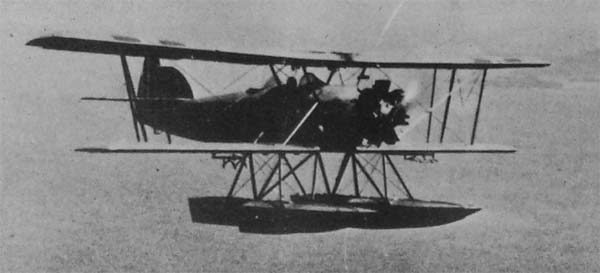
An M.F.10 airborne.

=== Early service ===
From May 1930 the prototype was given the registration number F.200, in line with the new number series to be used for two-seat trainers. The Royal Norwegian Navy Air Service's (RNNAS) goal for the type was to have one aircraft based at each of the three Norwegian naval air stations, leading to the delivery of two new aircraft, one in 1932 and another in 1933. The two new-built aircraft were delivered with Armstrong Siddeley Cheetah engines and a steel tube hull instead of F.200's wooden hull. Designated as M.F.10Bs and numbered F.202 and F.204, the two aircraft were modified with a new type balance rudder which greatly improved their flying characteristics. When F.202 was written off after a May 1935 crash a replacement aircraft was built and delivered in March 1936 as the fourth and last of the type. The same year F.200 had its wooden hull replaced with a steel tube one. In addition to its training role the M.F.10 was also used for operational tests, such as seaplanes' ability to land on and take off from snow and ice on frozen lakes. Successful tests were carried out in March 1933 with F.202 both on Borresvannet lake and on the snow-covered Kjeller air station.

=== Handling issues ===
The type had a degree of difficulties as to getting out of a spin, something which on 14 October 1938 led to an accident with F.200 during a training mission with a student pilot. When the student was to bring the aircraft out of its spin the rudders failed to respond and the engine ceased. At 400 metres altitude the student was ordered to parachute, while the aircraft regained control at the same moment the student, 2nd Lt. Follevåg, jumped. The instructor, 1st. Lt. Brinch landed on the water and picked up the student.

=== Second World War ===
==== In Norwegian service ====
At the outbreak of the Second World War two M.F.10s (F.202 and F.204) were still in service with the RNNAS and deployed for neutrality guard duties, both first being based at Karljohansvern naval air station but with F.204 relocation to Kristiansand on 7 March 1940. In the evening of 8 April 1940 it became clear to the commander of Karljohansvern naval air station, Lieutenant Commander Gösta Wendelbo, that the situation was becoming critical and he ordered all flyable aircraft under his command to fly to Oscarsborg Fortress to await the situation. The decision led to the dispatched aircraft becoming caught up in the Battle of Drøbak Sound and lost. Seven aircraft, including M.F.10 F.202, landed near Oscarsborg Fortress and were there when intense fighting between a German invasion flotilla and Norwegian coastal fortifications began. The aircraft were blocked in the area and soon froze in, making it impossible for them to escape. On 11 April 1940 the leader of the unit's four remaining aircraft, including F.202, disbanded the unit. Four airmen remained trying to get one aircraft airborne, but after a week they removed the machine guns and bombs from the aircraft and left the area, the aircraft eventually being picked up by the Germans and moved to Horten. F.200 did not take part in the neutrality protection duties due to undergoing major maintenance at Marinens Flyvebaatfabrikk in Horten and was captured there on 9 April 1940. F.204, based in Kristiansand, was flown to a fjord west of the port of Lillesand when the German invasion began and destroyed there by its own crew on 10 April 1940.

==== Possible German use ====
After the beginning of the German invasion of Norway, one M.F.10 was flown by the Germans from Horten to Gressholmen Airport near Oslo. At Gressholmen the aircraft was repainted and given the Norwegian word Fiskerioppsyn on one side and Fischereidienst on the other, both words meaning fisheries service. The Germans' intention was to use the M.F.10 and one Douglas DT-2 (number F.84) for fisheries surveillance duties off the coast of Møre. The project probably never got under way as the Luftwaffe demanded to have total control over the Norwegian airspace and were unlikely to have allowed any form of para-military organisation to fly over Norway. Although there were widespread contemporary rumours claiming that the aircraft were to be used for surveillance of Norwegian fishing boats, these have not been confirmed after searches of Norwegian and German archives.

== Specifications ==
Data from Hafsten 2003, 230

General characteristics

- Crew: Two, pilot and instructor
- Length: 8.735 m (26 ft 3 in)
- Wingspan: 12.50 m (40 ft 8 in)
- Height: 3.50 m (11 ft 2 in)
- Wing area: 34.0 m^{2} (366 sq ft)
- Empty weight: 1,040 kg (2,293 lb)
- Gross weight: 1,415 kg (3,120 lb)
- Powerplant: 1 × Armstrong Siddeley Cheetah IIA , 224 kW (300 hp)

Performance

- Maximum speed: 200 km/h (120 mph, 110 kn)
- Cruise speed: 135 km/h (84 mph, 73 kn)
- Range: 450 km (280 mi, 240 nmi)
- Rate of climb: 5.55 m/s (1,093 ft/min)

== See also ==
Related lists

- List of aircraft of World War II
