= Marinens Flyvebaatfabrikk M.F.5 =

General information
- Type: Scout (reconnaissance)
- Manufacturer: Marinens Flyvebaatfabrikk
- Designer: Halfdan Gyth Dehli
- Primary user: Royal Norwegian Navy Air Service
- Number built: 9

History
- Manufactured: 1918–1922
- Introduction date: 1919
- First flight: 19 November 1918
- Retired: 5 August 1926

The Marinens Flyvebaatfabrikk M.F.5 was a two-seat biplane floatplane built by the Royal Norwegian Navy Air Service aircraft factory Marinens Flyvebaatfabrikk from 1918. The M.F.5 was the first tractor configuration aircraft designed and built in Norway. During almost eight years of service the M.F.5 was mainly used as a reconnaissance aircraft, although one example saw service as a trainer.

== Design and development ==
During the latter part of the First World War, Marinens Flyvebaatfabrikk manufactured Sopwith Baby floatplane fighter aircraft under licence from the United Kingdom. Based on the experience with this aircraft type the factory's director, Captain Halfdan Gyth Dehli, designed the M.F.5, work beginning in 1917. The M.F.5 was designed with a tractor (or "puller") propulsion configuration, making it the first tractor aircraft designed in Norway. Up until the M.F.5 the Marinens Flyvebaatfabrikk factory had designed and built four different pusher types.

The M.F.5 was manufactured at Marinens Flyvebaatfabrikk's factory in Horten from 1918. A total of nine scout aircraft of the type were produced. Another two M.F.5s were planned, but not completed. When initiated, the production of the M.F.5s occupied the full capacity of the aircraft factory in Horten. The aircraft were powered by 160 hp 16-cylinder Sunbeam water-cooled engines imported from the United Kingdom from 1917 onwards. The Sunbeams did not perform as well as had been hoped, leading to Norwegian attempts at returning the engines, ending in an agreement that reduced the price on 12 of the 16 imported engines. The engines never functioned fully satisfactory, and were rebuilt several times over the years it saw service with the M.F.5. The last M.F.5s to be manufactured were equipped with more powerful 240 hp 6-cylinder Siddeley Puma water-cooled engines.

== Operational history ==
The type's first flight took place on 19 November 1918, shortly after the armistice between the German Empire and the Allies that ended the First World War. The first aircraft to fly was M.F.5 F.22, which was lost little over two weeks later when, on 4 December 1918, it suffered an engine malfunction and went into a spin. The aircraft crashed in Horten harbour, with one of the two on board suffering injuries and being hospitalised at the Royal Norwegian Navy's hospital in Horten. M.F.5 F.22 had only flown for 1 hour and 55 minutes before being lost.

In the winter of 1922, M.F.5 F.22 (II), one of the M.F.5s powered by a 240 hp Siddeley Puma engine, was used for a series of successful test landings and take-offs with floats on snow and ice. Tests on ice were carried out at Karljohansvern naval base in Horten, while tests on snow-covered surfaces were carried out on the nearby Lake Borrevannet.

During the type's close to eight years of service, six of the nine aircraft built were lost in accidents. In three of the six crashes engine failure was found to be the main cause of the incident. Pilot error was deemed the cause in two of the three remaining crashes, while M.F.22 (II) was lost to a sudden burst of wind during take-off on 29 May 1922. There were no deaths in any of the M.F.5 crashes. All but one of the type's crashes occurred in the area around the Royal Norwegian Navy's main base at Karljohansvern in Horten, with F.32 being the exception by suffering engine failure and crashing off the port city of Kristiansand.

All three surviving M.F.5s were retired from service on 5 August 1926. One of these three, M.F.5 F.26, had clocked the longest flying time of the type, a total of 55 hours in little over seven years of service. Although the type was designed and built as a scout aircraft for reconnaissance, one of the M.F.5s, F.34, served as a trainer with the Royal Norwegian Navy's flying school until lost to pilot error on 19 September 1921. The M.F.5 was not considered to have been a success, with only F.26 achieving more than 50 hours of flying time during its career.

== Specifications ==
Data from Hafsten and Arheim

General characteristics

- Crew: Two
- Length: 10 m (32 ft 10 in)
- Wingspan: 15 m (49 ft 3 in)
- Height: 3.66 m (12 ft 0 in)
- Empty weight: 1,200 kg (2,646 lb)
- Gross weight: 1,580 kg (3,483 lb)
- Powerplant: 1 × Sunbeam 6-cylinder piston engine, 120 kW (160 hp)
- Propellers: 2-bladed

Performance

- Maximum speed: 132 km/h (82 mph, 71 kn)
- Cruise speed: 115 km/h (71 mph, 62 kn)
- Range: 500 km (310 mi, 270 nmi)
- Rate of climb: 1.19 m/s (234 ft/min)

Armament

- Guns: 1 × Madsen machine gun (later replaced with a Lewis Gun)
- Bombs: 1 × 40 kg mine or five 10 kg bombs

== Bibliography ==
- Arheim, Tom (1994). Fra Spitfire til F-16: Luftforsvaret 50 år 1944–1994 (in Norwegian). Oslo: Sem & Stenersen. ISBN 82-7046-068-0.
- Hafsten, Bjørn; Tom Arheim (2003). Marinens Flygevåpen 1912–1944 (in Norwegian). Oslo: TankeStreken AS. ISBN 82-993535-1-3.
- Meyer, Fredrik (1977). Hærens og Marinens flyvåpen 1912–1945 (in Norwegian) (2nd ed.). Oslo: Gyldendal Norsk Forlag. ISBN 82-05-05608-0.
