= Marinens Flyvebaatfabrikk M.F.7 =

General information
- Type: Trainer
- Manufacturer: Marinens Flyvebaatfabrikk
- Primary user: Royal Norwegian Navy Air Service
- Number built: 2

History
- Manufactured: 1922–23
- Introduction date: 19 September 1923
- First flight: 30 January 1923
- Retired: 1931

The Marinens Flyvebaatfabrikk M.F.7 was a two-seat biplane floatplane built by the Royal Norwegian Navy Air Service aircraft factory Marinens Flyvebaatfabrikk in 1923. The M.F.7 was designed and employed as a trainer aircraft, and functioned as a temporary solution until a better aircraft was designed. Soon after it entered service, the aircraft factory's experience with the M.F.7 led to the construction of the Marinens Flyvebaatfabrikk M.F.8, which remained in service as the main trainer aircraft of the Royal Norwegian Navy Air Service until the German invasion of Norway in 1940.

== Design and development ==
By the early 1920s the Royal Norwegian Navy Air Service's main trainer aircraft, the pusher configuration Marinens Flyvebaatfabrikk M.F.4, which had been introduced in 1918, was outdated. The introduction of such new aircraft as the Hansa-Brandenburg W.33 reconnaissance aircraft left the M.F.4 unfit for service as a trainer. The wings of the M.F.4s were also considered to be too weak. This led to a requirement for a new trainer aircraft of the tractor configuration. Until a tractor aircraft could be designed, a final pusher type was built as an emergency measure, in the shape of the Marinens Flyvebaatfabrikk M.F.6. Design and construction of the Marinens Flyvebaatfabrikk M.F.7 began in March 1922. Initial orders from the Royal Norwegian Navy Air Service were for two aircraft, which in the end turned out to be the final number of aircraft built of the type.

The M.F.7, powered by a 160 hp (119 kW) Sunbeam engine, had stronger wings than its predecessor, and was initially fitted with floats made out of duralumin alloy imported from Germany.

Soon after test flying began, the imported duralumin-based floats proved troublesome, as they would not plane on water. The metal alloy floats were soon replaced by wooden floats bought by the Marinens Flyvebaatfabrikk after the bankruptcy of the civilian aircraft manufacturer Norsk Aeroplanfabrik. At the same time the carburettors in the aircraft's engines were replaced with newer models. Later the aircraft had their engines replaced with 160 hp (119 kW) Mercedes engines. Built as a trainer, the aircraft carried no armament.

== Operational history ==
The type's first flight took place on 30 January 1923, when First Lieutenant Finn Lützow-Holm took off with M.F.7 F.2 (III) from the Royal Norwegian Navy's main base at Horten. Lützow-Holm test flew the second M.F.7 built on 7 April 1923, when he took off in M.F.7 F.8 (III). After the changes to type's engine and floats had been carried out, test pilot Lützow-Holm declared that the aircraft was ready for service. In his report, Lützow-Holm stated that the aircraft was easy to manoeuvre both on water and in the air, although it was rear heavy and sensitive to gusts of wind. F.8 (III) entered service with the Royal Norwegian Navy Air Service Flying School on 19 September 1923, with F.2 (III) following suit on 15 October 1923. (Note: Finn Lützow-Holm had a long career in the Royal Norwegian Navy Air Service, rising to command the service from 1938.)

Based on its experience with the M.F.7, the Marinens Flyvebaatfabrikk began development of its successor already in October 1923. Among the weaknesses in the M.F.7, which were to be remedied in the Marinens Flyvebaatfabrikk M.F.8, was the low landing speed of only 50 km/h (31 mph). When the work on the M.F.8 was completed in 1924, it was a successful trainer type which remained in Norwegian service until the German invasion in 1940.

The M.F.7 remained in service for several years after the introduction of the M.F.8. M.F.7 F.2 (III) was discarded in January 1930, having flown for a total of 456 hours and 10 minutes. The other M.F.7, F.8 (III), was disassembled in the spring of 1931, having flown for 855 hours and 50 minutes. F.8 (III) was finally discarded on 2 February 1934. Although an interim solution to the Royal Norwegian Navy Air Service's training needs, the aircraft type was considered a success.

== Specifications ==
Data from Hafsten and Arheim

General characteristics

- Crew: Two
- Length: 9.9 m (32 ft 6 in)
- Wingspan: 14.7 m (48 ft 3 in)
- Height: 3.5 m (11 ft 6 in)
- Empty weight: 828 kg (1,825 lb)
- Gross weight: 1,120 kg (2,469 lb)
- Powerplant: 1 × Mercedes D.III 6-cyl. water-cooled in-line piston engine, 120 kW (160 hp)
- Propellers: 2-bladed

Performance

- Maximum speed: 120 km/h (75 mph, 65 kn)
- Cruise speed: 90 km/h (56 mph, 49 kn)
- Range: 275 km (171 mi, 148 nmi)
- Rate of climb: 1.39 m/s (274 ft/min)
