= Marinens Flyvebaatfabrikk M.F.12 =

M.F.12
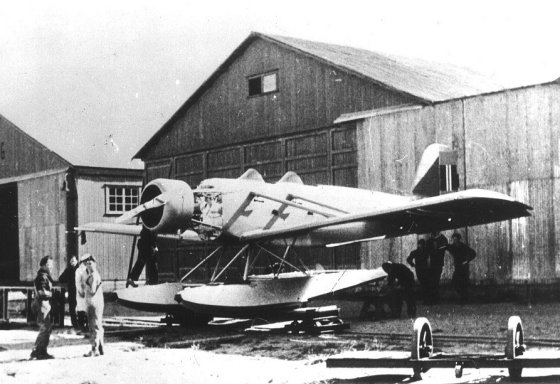
- The M.F.12 prototype F.14 (V).

General information
- Type: Military trainer seaplane
- National origin: Norway
- Manufacturer: Marinens Flyvebaatfabrikk
- Designer: Johan E. Høver
- Primary user: Royal Norwegian Navy Air Service
- Number built: 1

History
- First flight: 11 July 1939

The Marinens Flyvebaatfabrikk M.F.12 (sometimes known as the Høver M.F.12, after its designer) was a seaplane built in Norway in 1939 as a military trainer aircraft to replace the Norwegian Navy's aging fleet of M.F.8 trainers. Only a single prototype was constructed before Germany's invasion of Norway in 1940. The prototype, M.F.12 F.14 (V), was the last trainer built for the Royal Norwegian Navy Air Service (RNNAS).

== Design and manufacture ==
By the late 1930s flying school of the RNNAS requested that a new trainer aircraft be acquired to replace the M.F.8s. Following international aircraft development, a monoplane design seemed preferable and once again the RNNAS decided to design and construct the aircraft themselves. The order was given to the seaplane factory Marinens Flyvebaatfabrikk on 15 June 1937. The factory immediately began work on the design. The M.F.12 was a conventional design with two open cockpits in tandem and a low, strut-braced monoplane wing. The cockpit design was carried over from the M.F.11 reconnaissance aircraft then in service, and while it was originally intended to use the same float design that Marinens Flyvebaatfabrikk had been producing for their licence-built Hansa-Brandenburg W.33s, eventually floats by American manufacturer EDO were chosen. Four engines were considered for the M.F-12: the Wright R-670, Lycoming R-530-D2, Jacobs L-4M and the Continental K, with the Jacobs engine eventually selected.

== First flights ==
The first, unofficial, flight occurred on 11 July 1939, the day the aircraft was launched, at the hands of Johan E. Høver himself, a fact initially kept secret because he was unauthorised to make it, and the first official flight took place six days later. The official orders for 11 July 1939 had been to merely taxi the M.F.12 F.14 (V) to the northern slipway, where it was to wait until the factory's control officer Kristian Østby returned from a trip to Germany to accept the first of the Heinkel He 115 torpedo bombers ordered by the RNNAS. All new aircraft were supposed to be first tested by the control officer, who also received a 500 Norwegian kroner (NOK) fee for each such test. However, as Høver felt that the aircraft seemed to work fine, he made a 20-minute flight, being very pleased with its performance when he landed. The issue was kept secret, and Østby could make the official first flight and collect his 500 NOK on 17 July.

== Development halted ==
Development stalled after a flight test by Lützow Holm, commander of the Karljohansvern base. After a rough landing, following drastic and hazardous flying, he demanded that the design be revised to strengthen it before entering production. The construction yard opposed this, pointing out that the design was already 10% stronger than had been specified by the Navy. While the dispute continued, the M.F.12 was grounded at Karljohansvern. In June 1939, shortly before the M.F.12 took to the air for the first time, the Norwegian Ministry of Defence set down a joint military and civilian commission to decide on a new common trainer for both the Royal Norwegian Navy Air Service, its Army cousin; the Norwegian Army Air Service, and the civilian air schools. Further work on the M.F.12 was put on hold while the commission worked on its report. Before any conclusion could be made, the Germans invaded Norway on 9 April 1940.

== Fate of the prototype ==
The final disposition of the prototype is lost to history, but Høver recalls it being impounded by the German occupation forces, after having been abandoned at Horten on 9 April 1940. F.14 (V) had been at Karljohansvern naval base in Horten for repairs when the Germans landed in Norway.

== Quotations ==
It was a first-rate, nice little bus. It flew all on its own when in hands off mode, incredibly light and comfortable.

— Johan E. Høver after his secret 11 July 1939 flight, page 103 in Bjørn Hafsten's Marinens Flygevåpen 1912–1944 (Note: Norwegian: Det var en førsteklasses, fin liten buss. Den fløy helt av seg selv når innstillet på hands off, storartet lett og behagelig. Hafsten 2003, 103)

== Specifications ==
Data from "Skoleflyet MF-12"

General characteristics

- Crew: Two, pilot and instructor
- Length: 9.73 m (31 ft 11 in)
- Wingspan: 13.60 m (34 ft 7 in)
- Height: 2.60 m (8 ft 6 in)
- Powerplant: 1 × Jacobs L-4M , 168 kW (225 hp)

Performance

- Maximum speed: 195 km/h (121 mph, 105 kn)

== Bibliography ==
- Hafsten, Bjørn; Tom Arheim (2003). Marinens Flygevåpen 1912–1944 (in Norwegian). Oslo: TankeStreken AS. ISBN 82-993535-1-3.
- Taylor, Michael J. H. (1989). Jane's Encyclopedia of Aviation. London: Studio Editions.
- Stein, Gulli. "Skoleflyet MF-12". Borreminne (in Norwegian). Borre Historielag. Archived from the original on 11 August 2007.
