= Armstrong Siddeley Cheetah =

1930s British piston aircraft engine

Cheetah
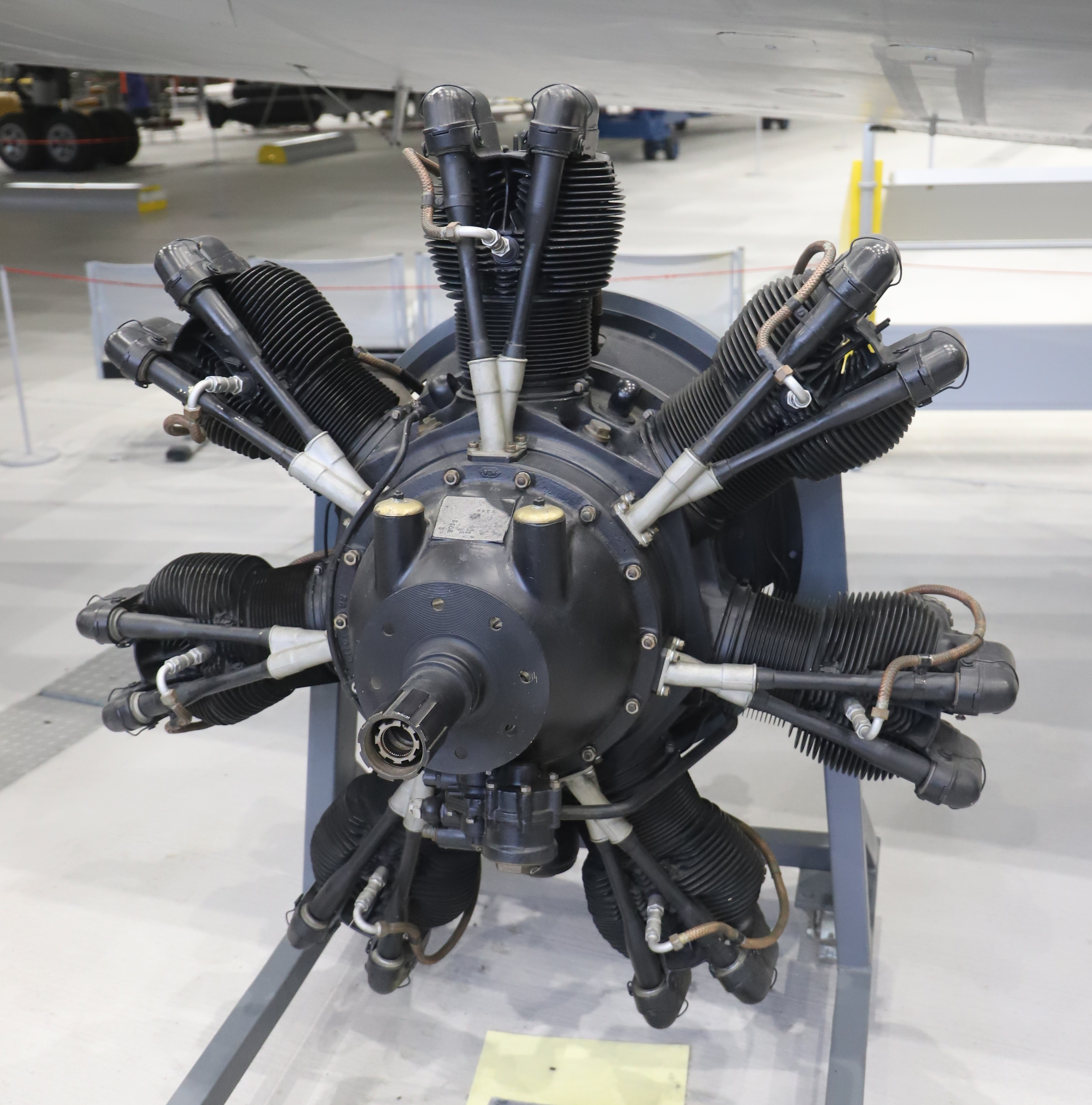
- Armstrong Siddeley Cheetah engine on display at the Imperial War Museum Duxford
- Type: Radial engine
- National origin: United Kingdom
- Manufacturer: Armstrong Siddeley Motors Ltd.
- First run: 1935
- Major applications: Airspeed Oxford
- Number built: >37,200
- Developed from: Armstrong Siddeley Lynx

The Armstrong Siddeley Cheetah is a seven-cylinder British air-cooled aircraft radial engine of 834 cu in (13.65 L) capacity introduced in 1935 and produced until 1948. Early variants of the Cheetah were initially known as the Lynx Major.

The Cheetah was used to power many British trainer aircraft during World War II including the Avro Anson and Airspeed Oxford.

== Design and development ==
The Cheetah was developed from the earlier Lynx using the increased bore cylinders from the Armstrong Siddeley Panther but the engine retained the stroke of the Lynx. Initially only direct-drive variants were produced with later engines being made available with propeller reduction gear of various ratios. Superchargers were also available for later variants, both geared and directly driven by the crankshaft.

The basic design of the Cheetah remained unchanged from its introduction in 1935 to the last examples built in 1948. It was the first engine of its type to be certified for 1,200 hours of operational time between overhauls (TBO), with over 37,200 examples built.

== Variants ==
List from: LumsdenNote:

Lynx V (Lynx Major)
1930, 230 hp (171 kW).
Cheetah V
1935, 270 hp (201 kW) at 2,100 rpm.
Cheetah VA
1935, 285 hp (212 kW) at 2,425 rpm.
Cheetah VI
1935, 307 hp (229 kW) at 2,425 rpm.
Cheetah VIA
1936, as Mk VI but with Mk IX cylinders.

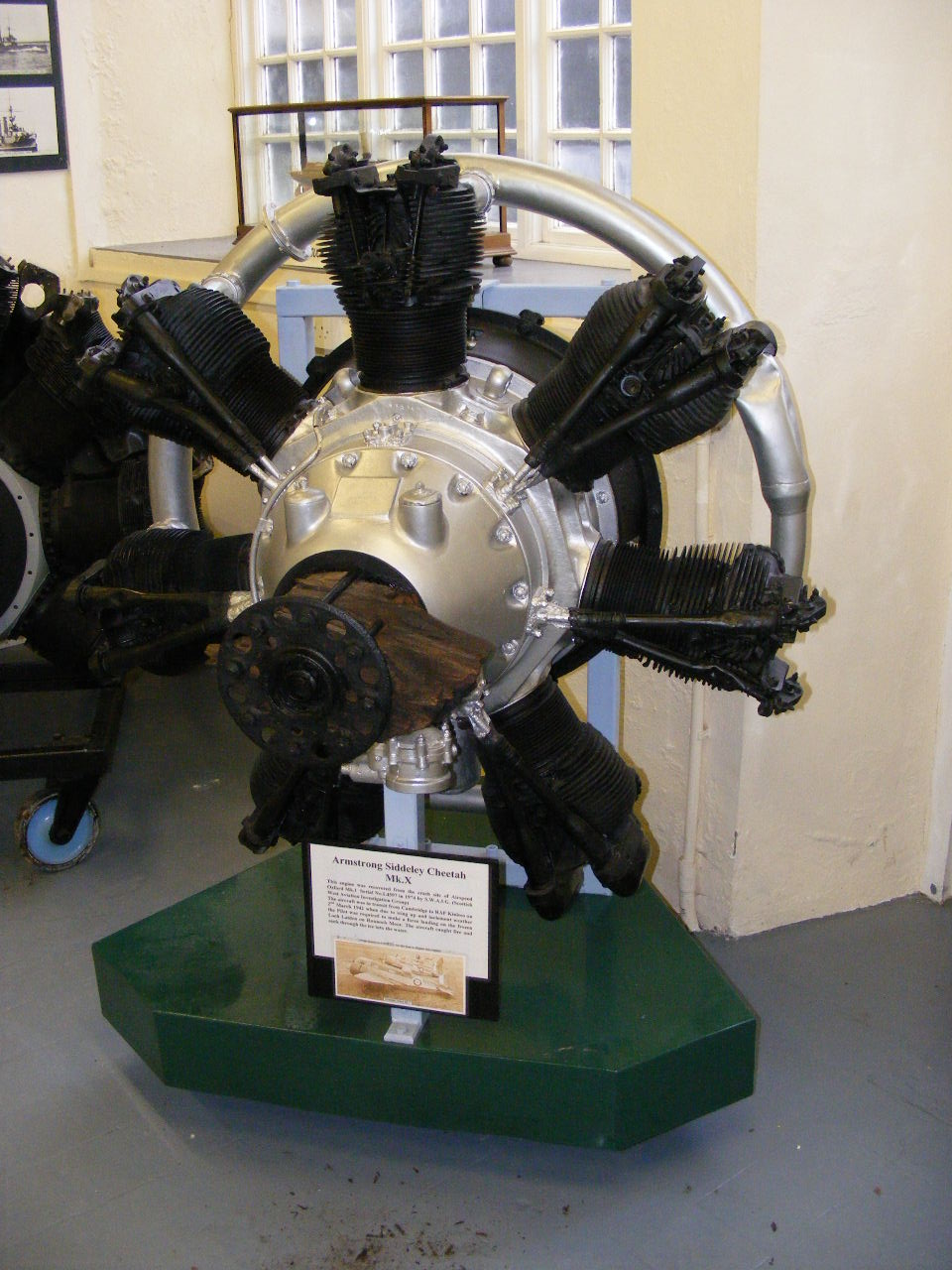
Preserved Cheetah X

Cheetah IX
1937, 345 hp (257 kW) at 2,425 rpm.
Cheetah X
1938, 375 hp (280 kW) at 2,300 rpm.
Cheetah XI
345 hp (257 kW) at 2,425 rpm, geared version of Cheetah X.
Cheetah XII
Similar to Mk X, adapted for target drone aircraft.
Cheetah XV
420 hp (313 kW) at 2,425 rpm.
Cheetah XVII
1948, 385 hp (287 kW) at 2,425 rpm.
Cheetah XVIII
385 hp (287 kW) at 2,425 rpm, carburettor modified for aerobatics.
Cheetah XIX
355 hp (265 kW) at 2,425 rpm
Cheetah 25
345 hp (257 kW) at 2,425 rpm, Cheetah XV uprated to 475 hp (355 kW) at 2,700 rpm, modified constant-speed unit.
Cheetah 26
385 hp (287 kW).
Cheetah 27
1948, 385 hp (287 kW).

== Applications ==
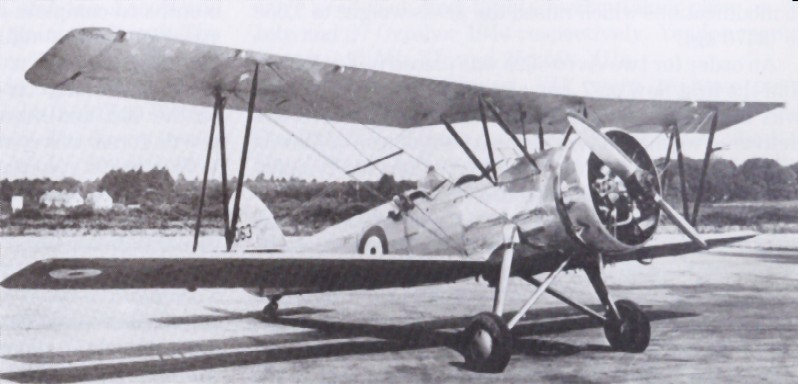
Avro 626 Prefect

- Airspeed Consul
- Airspeed Courier
- Airspeed Envoy
- Airspeed Oxford
- Airspeed Queen Wasp
- Airspeed Viceroy
- Avro 626
- Avro 652
- Avro Anson
- Blackburn Lincock
- Bristol Bulldog TM (type 124)
- CASA C-201 Alcotán
- de Havilland Hawk Moth
- Handley Page H.P.R.2
- Hispano HS-42
- IAe.22 DL
- Kingsford Smith PL.7
- Koolhoven F.K.51
- Lancashire Aircraft Prospector
- Marinens Flyvebaatfabrikk M.F.8
- Marinens Flyvebaatfabrikk M.F.10
- Percival Provost (prototype)
- SEA.1
- VEF JDA-10M

== Surviving engines ==
As of October 2008 at least four Cheetah engines remained airworthy. Two Cheetah 17s power the Anson T21 operated by the Classic Air Force and another pair of Cheetah 17s are fitted to Avro Nineteen, G-AHKX registered to BAE Systems but normally based at the Shuttleworth Collection.

== Engines on display ==
Preserved Armstrong Siddeley Cheetah engines are on public display at the following museums:

- Arkansas Air & Military Museum
- Aviation Heritage Museum (Western Australia)
- Brooklands Museum
- City of Norwich Aviation Museum in Horsham St Faith, Norfolk.
- Fleet Air Arm Museum
- Historical Aircraft Restoration Society Albion Park, New South Wales, Australia
- Malta Aviation Museum
- Museo del Aire y del Espacio, Cuatro Vientos, Madrid (Spain)
- Port Elizabeth branch of the South African Air Force Museum
- Royal Air Force Museum Cosford
- South Australian Aviation Museum, Adelaide. Two Mk9 Operational Displays

== Specifications (Cheetah IX) ==
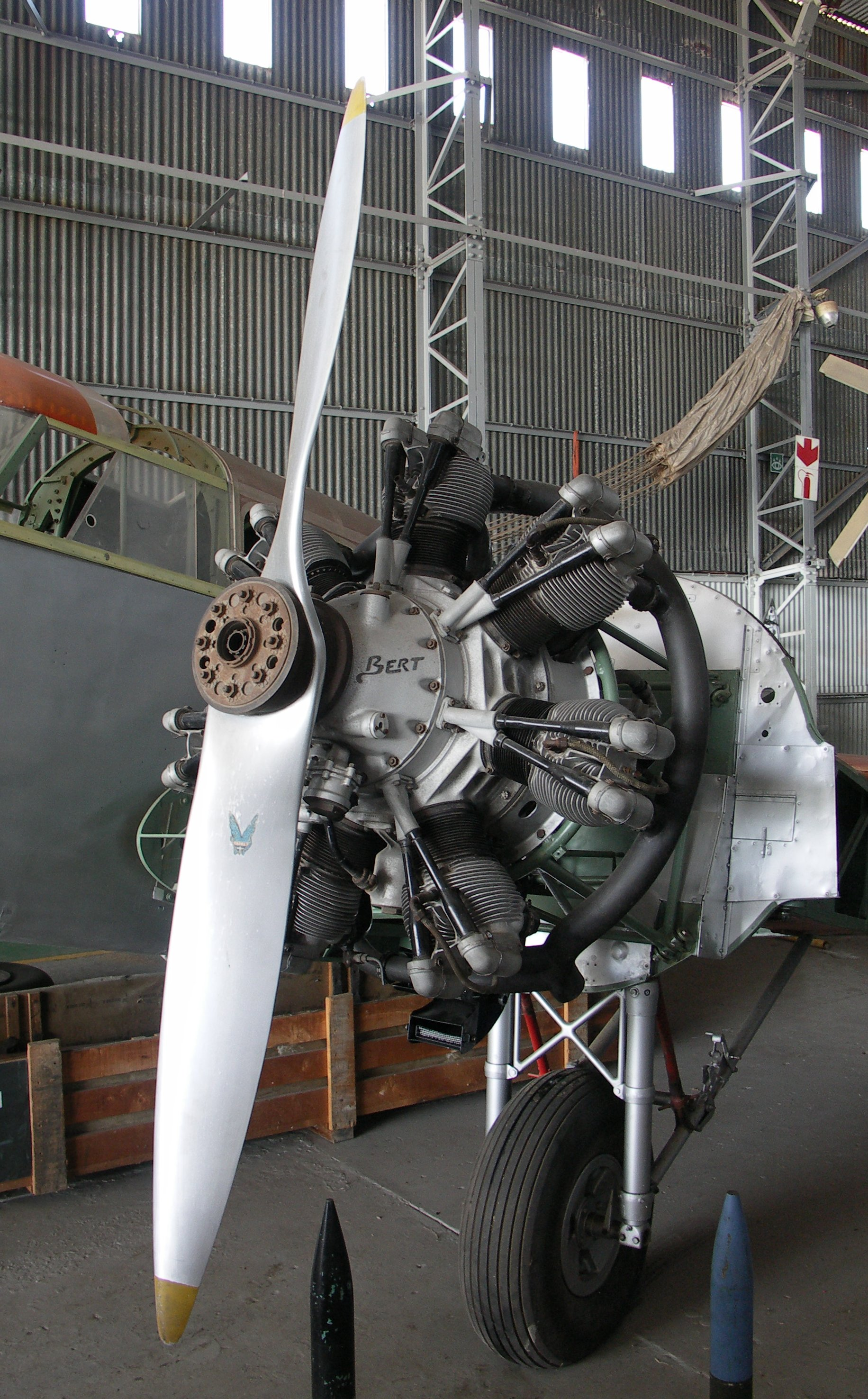
Cheetah engine fitted to an Airspeed Oxford undergoing restoration

Data from

=== General characteristics ===
- Type: Seven-cylinder single-row supercharged air-cooled radial engine
- Bore: 5.25 in (133 mm)
- Stroke: 5.5 in (140 mm)
- Displacement: 834 cu in (13.65 L)
- Length: 52.8 in (1,342 mm)
- Diameter: 47.6 in (1,210 mm)
- Dry weight: 637 lb (289 kg)

=== Components ===
- Valvetrain: Two pushrod-actuated valves per cylinder
- Supercharger: Centrifugal, 5.4:1 reduction
- Fuel system: Claudel-Hobson carburettor
- Fuel type: 87 octane rating petrol
- Cooling system: Air-cooled
- Reduction gear: No

=== Performance ===
- Power output:
- 338 hp (252 kW) at 2,100 rpm for takeoff
- 345 hp (257 kW) at 2,425 rpm at 7,875 ft (2,400 m)
- Specific power: 0.41 hp/cu in (18.83 kW/L)
- Compression ratio: 6.35:1
- Specific fuel consumption: 0.45 lb/hp/hr (271 g/kW/hr)
- Oil consumption: 0.24–0.45 oz/hp/hr (9–17 g/kW/hr)
- Power-to-weight ratio: 0.54 hp/lb (0.89 kW/kg)

== See also ==
Related development

- Armstrong Siddeley Lynx
- Armstrong Siddeley Panther

Comparable engines

- Avia Rk.17
- Bristol Neptune
- Gnome-Rhône 7K
- Jacobs R-830
- Piaggio Stella P.VII
- Pratt & Whitney Wasp Junior
- Wright R-760

Related lists

- List of aircraft engines
