= Marinens Flyvebaatfabrikk M.F.6 =

General information
- Type: Trainer
- Manufacturer: Marinens Flyvebaatfabrikk
- Primary user: Royal Norwegian Navy Air Service
- Number built: 2

History
- Manufactured: 1921–22
- First flight: 30 April 1921
- Retired: May 1927

The Marinens Flyvebaatfabrikk M.F.6 was a two-seat biplane floatplane built by the Royal Norwegian Navy Air Service aircraft factory Marinens Flyvebaatfabrikk in 1921. The M.F.6 was designed and employed as a trainer aircraft. The type was the last pusher configuration aircraft in service with the Royal Norwegian Navy Air Service. The M.F.6 functioned as a makeshift solution until a more modern tractor configuration aircraft could be built. The type was retired once a more permanent solution to the Royal Norwegian Navy Air Service's training needs was found in mid-1920s.

== Design and development ==
In the early 1920s the Royal Norwegian Navy Air Service discovered that its main trainer type, the Marinens Flyvebaatfabrikk M.F.4, suffered from weaknesses in the wings. Initially requests for new aircraft were dismissed by the Ministry of Defence, but following the loss of one M.F.4 permission was granted for the construction of two Farman type pusher aircraft as an emergency solution. The Marinens Flyvebaatfabrikk M.F.6 was the last Maurice Farman type built for the Royal Norwegian Navy Air Service, as well as the service's last pusher type. The M.F.6 was powered by a Beardmore 160 hp engine, imported from the United Kingdom. Concurrently with the construction of the M.F.6 another interim aircraft type was designed by Marinens Flyvebaatfabrikk for the Royal Norwegian Navy Air Service, the tractor configuration type Marinens Flyvebaatfabrikk M.F.7.

== Operational history ==
One M.F.6 (F.10 (IV)) was delivered from Marinens Flyvebaatfabrikk in 1921, and a second (F.4 (IV))in 1922. F.10 (IV) had its first flight on 30 April 1921, followed by F.4 (IV) on 16 June 1922. The type served until replaced by the much more modern Marinens Flyvebaatfabrikk M.F.8 in the mid-1920s. F.10 (IV) was discarded in 1926 and F.4 (IV) in May 1927, following the 1924 introduction of the M.F.8. By the time of retirement, F.10 (IV) had flown for 439 hours and 50 minutes, while F.4 (IV) had flown for 333 hours and 50 minutes. None of the two aircraft suffered any major accidents during their service lives.

== Specifications ==
Data from Hafsten and Arheim

General characteristics

- Crew: Two
- Length: 10.2 m (33 ft 6 in)
- Wingspan: 15.6 m (51 ft 2 in)
- Height: 3.52 m (11 ft 7 in)
- Empty weight: 1,030 kg (2,271 lb)
- Gross weight: 1,330 kg (2,932 lb)
- Powerplant: 1 × Beardmore 160 hp 6-cyl. water-cooled in-line upright piston engine, 120 kW (160 hp)
- Propellers: 2-bladed

Performance

- Maximum speed: 120 km/h (75 mph, 65 kn)
- Cruise speed: 90 km/h (56 mph, 49 kn)
- Range: 200 km (120 mi, 110 nmi)
- Rate of climb: 1.66 m/s (327 ft/min)
