= SEA.1 =

General information
- Type: Twin engine light transport
- National origin: Belgium
- Manufacturer: Société Belge d'Etudes Aéronautiques (SEA)
- Designer: Maurice Peetermans
- Number built: 1

History
- First flight: mid-1936

The SEA.1 was a Belgian, multi-purpose, light twin engine monoplane flown in 1936. Only one was built; it was later converted into a single engine aircraft and used by the military.

== Design ==
The SEA-1 was the first aircraft built by the Société Belge d'Etudes Aéronautiques to their own design. It was intended to be capable of many rôles, both civil and military, in the same way as the Avro Anson and Potez 26 families. It was an up-to-date aircraft with a simple structure, not needing advanced construction skills or facilities.

In plan its cantilever low wing was strongly straight tapered, with almost all the sweep on the trailing edge. The wingtips were semi-elliptical. It had a one-piece, wooden, two box spar structure with plywood skin. The outer parts of the wing carried broad chord, fabric covered ailerons with flaps inboard from the ailerons to the fuselage. Its 123 kW (165 hp), five cylinder Armstrong Siddeley Genet Major IA radial engines were mounted close to the fuselage, well ahead of the leading edges. They were enclosed in broad chord cowlings, with long nacelles behind them that reached to the trailing edges. Their fuel tanks were in the wing.

The slim, tapered, flat-sided fuselage was built around four chrome-molybdenum steel longerons and was fabric covered. Its enclosed cockpit had side-by-side seats at the leading edge, with a cabin behind them lit by four windows on each side and fitted with up to six passenger seats. It was entered by a large, port-side door. At the rear, the tapered horizontal tail was mounted close to the top of the fuselage and carried inset, trim tab-assisted elevators. The SEA-1 had a small fin but a large, rounded, balanced rudder which was also tab-assisted. The tail surfaces were all ply covered.

The SEA-1 had a retractable undercarriage. Its low pressure mainwheels were fork-mounted with oleo strut shock absorbers under the engines, resulting in a track of 3.20 m (126 in); the wheels were enclosed in the nacelles in flight. There was a small tailwheel on the fuselage under the rudder.

== Development ==
The SEA-1 was registered as a Peetermans SEA.1, OO-PET, on 28 May 1936. The date of its first flight is not known but by early September 1936 it had flown for fifteen hours. It appeared at the Brussels Aero show in 1937, which opened on 26 May, but by mid-1938 it had undergone major revisions which replaced the twin Genet Majors with a single 190 kW (260 hp), seven cylinder Armstrong Siddeley Cheetah radial and also replaced the retractable undercarriage with fixed gear.

It was removed from the civil register on 7 July 1938 and used as a training machine by the Belgian forces.

== Specifications ==
Data from Les Ailes 9 September 1936

General characteristics

- Crew: One or two
- Capacity: up to six passengers
- Length: 9.50 m (31 ft 2 in)
- Wingspan: 12.50 m (41 ft 0 in)
- Height: 1.80 m (5 ft 11 in)
- Wing area: 20 m^{2} (220 sq ft)
- Aspect ratio: 7.8
- Empty weight: 1,150 kg (2,535 lb)
- Gross weight: 1,950 kg (4,299 lb)
- Powerplant: 2 × Armstrong Siddeley Genet Major IA 5-cylinder radial, 123 kW (165 hp) each
- Propellers: 2-bladed

Performance

- Maximum speed: 280 km/h (170 mph, 150 kn)
- Cruise speed: 260 km/h (160 mph, 140 kn)
- Range: 1,850 km (1,150 mi, 1,000 nmi) with 380 kg (840 lb)
- Service ceiling: 5,300 m (17,400 ft) practical
