= Marinens Flyvebaatfabrikk M.F.8 =

MF.8
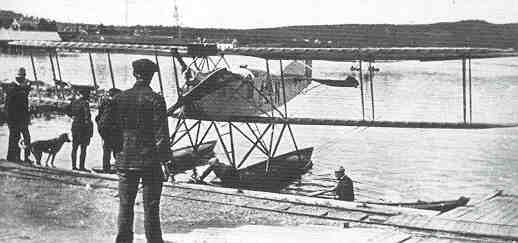

General information
- Type: Training seaplane
- National origin: Norway
- Manufacturer: Marinens Flyvebaatfabrikk
- Designer: Johann E. Høver
- Primary user: Royal Norwegian Navy Air Service
- Number built: 8

History
- First flight: 30 May 1924

The Marinens Flyvebaatfabrikk MF.8 (also known as the Høver MF.8, after its designer) was a military training seaplane built in Norway in the 1920s.

== Design and development ==
It was a conventional two-bay biplane design based on the M.F.6 and M.F.7, with open cockpits in tandem for the student and instructor. The main difference between the M.F.8 and the M.F.7 were that M.F.8 had a new tail rudder and wing profile, in order to increase landing speed. The new profile had been developed by the Swedish professor Nordensvan, in cooperation with the Norwegian Army Air Service.

=== Engine problems ===
The first building of the two first aircraft began in December 1923, F.6 (III) being finished 30 May 1924 and F.12 in August the same year. The first aircraft were delivered with 100 hp (75 kW) Scania-Vabis engines, which proved too weak and was replaced with 160 hp (120 kW) Beardmore or Sunbeam engines. For the next two aircraft produced the Royal Norwegian Navy Air Service (RNNAS) settled on a 160 hp (120 kW) Mercedes engine and aircraft with this engine were redesignated as M.F.8Bs. However, in 1932 Marinens Flyvebaatfabrikk had to find a replacement for the Mercedes engines as spare parts became hard to procure. A Bristol Lucifer was borrowed from Kjeller Aircraft Factory and a Walter Regulus from a factory in Prague, were both tested at Horten. Still, both engines proved too costly to finance. Barely used Armstrong Siddeley Cheetah IIA engines were found in British surplus stockpiles and purchased for 500 Norwegian kroner apiece. After rebuilding with a larger propeller engine output was reduced from 265 hp (198 kW) to 180 hp (130 kW) making them suitable for a trainer, and these were fitted to both M.F.8 and M.F.10 trainers. By early summer 1936 all M.F.8s had been rebuilt with Armstrong Siddeley Cheetah IIA engines however with the engine out of production spare parts once more became a problem.

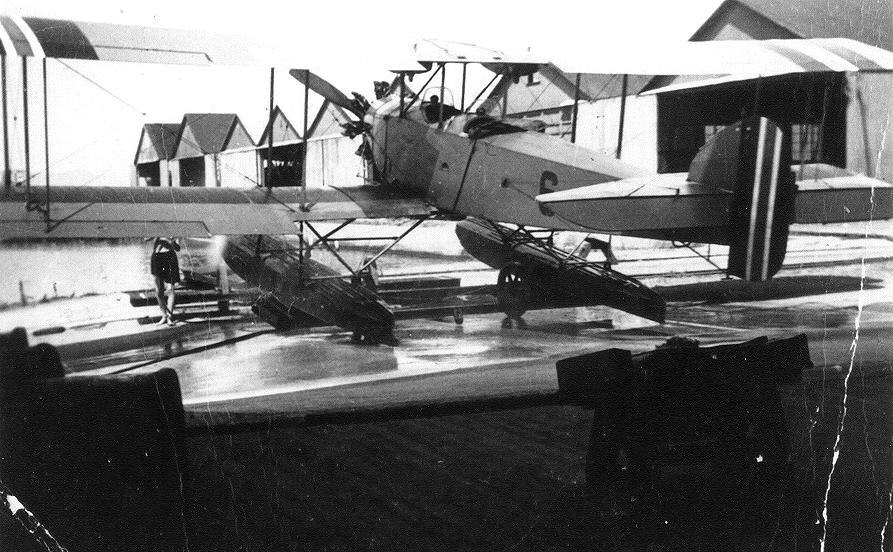
Rear view of an M.F.8.

The Walter Regulus engine had performed well during the testing in Horten and examples were purchased, however the engine did not perform as well as anticipated and in 1938 the Czech factory ceased production. The American Jacobs L-4M engine was used to replace the Walter Regulus during the winter of 1939-1940.

== Operational use ==
In all the M.F.8 design was very successful, with the pilots of the RNNAS receiving their first training on it up until the German invasion of Norway, the last of the type having been delivered in October 1935. Plans to replace it with a version of the Army's Tiger Moth trainer equipped with floats failed when tests in 1934 showed that the Tiger Moth was of little value as a seaplane. Marinens Flyvebaatfabrikk began designing and prototype production on the monoplane trainer Marinens Flyvebaatfabrikk M.F.12 from 15 June 1937, intended as a replacement for the M.F.8, but internal disagreements delayed the introduction of the new type until the German invasion halted all work. Five of the eight M.F.8s produced were still in service at the outbreak of the Second World War, flying for the last times on 13 and 14 December 1939 before being placed in storage at Karljohansvern where they were all captured by the Germans on 9 April 1940.

== Specifications ==
Data from Hafsten 2003, p.225

General characteristics

- Crew: Two, pilot and instructor
- Length: 9.70 m (31 ft 10 in)
- Wingspan: 14.50 m (47 ft 7 in)
- Height: 3.50 m (11 ft 6 in)
- Empty weight: 975 kg (2,150 lb)
- Gross weight: 1,275 kg (2,810 lb)
- Powerplant: 1 × Armstrong Siddeley Cheetah IIA , 210 kW (280 hp)

Performance

- Maximum speed: 105 km/h (65 mph, 56 kn)
- Cruise speed: 80 km/h (50 mph, 43 kn)
- Range: 370 km (230 mi, 200 nmi)

== See also ==
Related lists

- List of aircraft of World War II
