= Marinens Flyvebaatfabrikk M.F.9 =

Fighter seaplane built in Norway in the 1920s

M.F.9 Høverjager
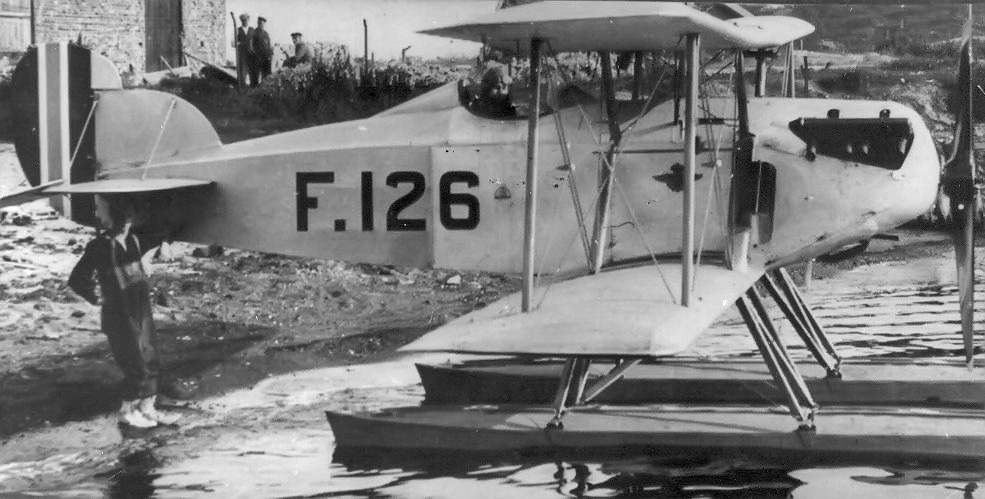
- The M.F.9B fighter aircraft F.126.

General information
- Type: Fighter seaplane
- National origin: Norway
- Manufacturer: Marinens Flyvebaatfabrikk
- Designer: Johann E. Høver
- Primary user: Royal Norwegian Navy Air Service
- Number built: 10

History
- First flight: 4 June 1925
- Retired: 17 July 1932

The Marinens Flyvebaatfabrikk M.F.9 Høverjager ("Høver fighter"), also known as the Høver M.F.9 after its designer, Johann E. Høver. It was a fighter seaplane built in Norway in the 1920s.

== Background ==
In the early 1920s the Royal Norwegian Navy Air Service (RNNAS) began looking for a replacement for its Sopwith Baby fighter aircraft, contacting 19 foreign manufacturers asking for bids for licence production of four fighter aircraft in Norway. While many offers were received, only a few of the aircraft types on offer were for purpose-designed seaplanes. As it was the clear request of the RNNAS to have a tried and tested seaplane fighter only the bids coming in from Fokker and Nieuport Astra satisfied the requirement. As the cost of both these offers were considered far too high, Johann E. Høver, managing director at Marinens Flyvebaatfabrikk, recommended that a future fighter should be designed and constructed at his factory in Horten. Høver claimed that he could deliver four fighters with 300 horsepower (220 kW) Hispano-Suiza engines at the cost of 220,000 Norwegian kroner, just half of what the foreign bidders demanded. After cost estimates and calculations had been carried out, the Norwegian Ministry of Defence approved the project on 8 March 1924. The project was then submitted to the Permanent Flying Commission (Norwegian: Den permanente Flyvekommisjon) and evaluated on 1 May 1924. Only Klingenberg, managing director of the Kjeller Aircraft Factory, had a negative opinion of the design, being especially critical of the choice of a relatively weak engine. The manufacture of parts for the prototype M.F.9 began in August 1924 and the wing construction was tested at an aeronautical institute in Göttingen in the German Weimar Republic, as well as being brought to breaking point in Horten. The Royal Norwegian Navy required the aircraft to have a top speed of 200 km/h, reach an altitude of 3,000 metres in 12 minutes and have a sturdy construction able to endure dog fighting. The aircraft also needed to be a stable platform and be easy to manoeuvre on water.

== Design ==
It was a largely conventional single-bay biplane design, but featured an additional set of struts bracing the lower wings to the fuselage sides. An open cockpit was provided for the pilot and construction throughout was of wood. Performance was impressive, with the type setting a European altitude record of 8,600 m (28,200 ft) in 1931 but it was never a popular aircraft with pilots on account of its tendency to spin.

== Operational use ==
The prototype first flew on 4 June 1925 and completed four trips on the first day with very satisfying results. The next day speed and altitude tests were held, again with good results. Testing was then unexpectedly halted as the testing officer, Lützow-Holm, was ordered to Svalbard to take part in the search for the missing polar explorer Roald Amundsen and his two Dornier Wal flying boats.

The prototype, F.120, was used as a target aircraft during anti-aircraft artillery demonstrations on 13 September 1925, fitted with skis in February–March 1926 and was handed over for active service on 15 July 1926. F.120 exceeded all expectations as to speed, rate of climb and maximum altitude, leading the way for the manufacture of the remaining three aircraft on order from July 1925. Having been slightly modified from the prototype, the three other aircraft were designated as M.F.9Bs (F.122, F.124 and F.126). At first the M.F.9s received an enthusiastic welcome in the RNNAS, but after a near-fatal spin accident due to a structural breakage in the engine in September 1926 confidence in the aircraft type began to wane.

=== Problems and retirement ===
In July and August 1928 another series of four M.F.9Bs (F.128, F.130, F.132 and F.134) were delivered from the factory in Horten. Although M.F.9s were used during the annual summer exercises only the most experienced officer pilots were allowed to fly the type, all forms of acrobatics being banned and most pilots unwilling to perform any drastic manoeuvres. The first total loss of the type occurred on 27 August 1929 when F.120 crashed during landing. A replacement aircraft, F.120 (II) was finished in June 1930.

As the weak Hispano-Suiza engine prevented the M.F.9 from being a truly effective fighter aircraft work was carried out from the autumn of 1929 to the spring of 1931 to find a different engine to have in reserve and install in case of war. Two engines were tested, first a 425 hp (317 kW) Bristol Jupiter which at the time was the standard engine of the Norwegian Army Air Service's Fokker C.V-E scout-bombers, and secondly an Armstrong Siddeley Jaguar VII 14-cylinder air-cooled engine.

However, accidents involving the aircraft entering uncontrolled spins continued with another aircraft being lost on 25 July 1930. At this point pilot confidence in the aircraft reached an all-time low, with seven officer pilots writing a letter of protest to the Ministry of Defence, voicing their opposition to the further use of the M.F.9. The criticism led to the halting of work on five M.F.9s then under construction (F.136, F.138, F.140 and replacement machines F.130 and F.132), although one almost complete M.F.9c (F.142) was finished in February 1932. F.142 and the incomplete aircraft had steel tube hulls instead of the wooden constructions of the earlier aircraft. An investigative commission concluded on 4 May 1932 that even the improved M.F.9c model was not usable for training purposes and recommended that the type should be discarded entirely. Director Høver strongly opposed this view, but did not win through with his view that further improvements could save the aircraft and the type was retired and put in reserve on 17 July 1932. The document sent by the Ministry of Defence to the RNNAS was signed by the Agrarian Party Minister of Defence, Vidkun Quisling.

The reason that the M.F.9 was put in reserve and not scrapped outright was the Sopwith Baby fighters had been scrapped a short time earlier, necessitating the retention of the M.F.9 as a reserve fighter force. Still, by the mid-1930s most of the aircraft were scrapped, the last four being retired in May 1939. The last M.F.9 operational, M.F.9c F.142, was used by the Marinens Flyvebaatfabrikk control officer until 28 May 1937 and then stored at the factory until 6 May 1939 when the Ministry of Defence approved of plans to preserve it as a museum piece. Although the final fate of F.142 is not known, it is assumed that it was burned by the German occupation forces during the Second World War. The M.F.9 was never replaced as a fighter in the RNNAS, the service instead choosing to focus on reconnaissance and torpedo aircraft.

== Specifications ==
Data from Marinens Flygevåpen 1912–1944, Jane's all the World's Aircraft 1928

General characteristics

- Crew: 1
- Length: 10.45 m (34 ft 3 in)
- Wingspan: 7.77 m (25 ft 6 in)
- Height: 3.12 m (10 ft 3 in)
- Wing area: 28 m^{2} (300 sq ft)
- Empty weight: 860 kg (1,896 lb)
- Gross weight: 1,230 kg (2,712 lb)
- Powerplant: 1 × Hispano-Suiza 8F V-8 water-cooled piston engine, 220 kW (300 hp)
- Propellers: 2-bladed fixed-pitch wooden propeller

Performance

- Maximum speed: 200 km/h (120 mph, 110 kn)
- Cruise speed: 150 km/h (93 mph, 81 kn)
- Range: 550 km (340 mi, 300 nmi)
- Rate of climb: 5.55 m/s (1,093 ft/min)
- Wing loading: 44 kg/m^{2} (9.0 lb/sq ft)
- Power/mass: 0.1749 kW/kg (0.1064 hp/lb)

Armament
