= Marinens Flyvebaatfabrikk M.F.1 =

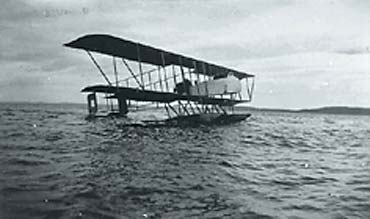
- M.F.1

General information
- Type: Maritime reconnaissance
- Manufacturer: Marinens Flyvebaatfabrikk
- Designer: Maurice Farman
- Primary user: Royal Norwegian Navy Air Service
- Number built: 5

History
- Manufactured: 1915–1917
- Introduction date: 1915
- First flight: 4 June 1915

The Marinens Flyvebaatfabrikk M.F.1 was a two-seat biplane floatplane, the first aircraft produced by the Royal Norwegian Navy Air Service's aircraft factory Marinens Flyvebaatfabrikk in Horten, built after Maurice Farman's MF.7 design. The construction began in the summer of 1915, with plans borrowed from the Norwegian Army Air Service's aircraft factory at Kjeller.

== Background ==
Until the delivery of the M.F.1s the Royal Norwegian Navy Air Service had operated a Farman given to the Norwegian Army by Norwegian polar explorer Roald Amundsen on 3 August 1914. Amundsen had intended to use the aircraft for an expedition through the North-East Passage and the Arctic Ocean. The Norwegian Army had lent Amundsen's Farman to the Royal Norwegian Navy Air Service to enable it to carry out neutrality protection duties during the First World War. The Royal Norwegian Navy Air Service was very pleased with the performance of Amundsen's Farman and wanted to produce aircraft of the same model. The delivery of M.F.1s allowed the Royal Norwegian Navy Air Service to hand Amundsen's Farman back to the Norwegian Army Air Service.

== Production ==
At the time Marinens Flyvebaatfabrikk consisted of a 30 square metres room and the production of parts was done at the navy yard at Karljohansvern. Only the assembly and minor work was done at the factory itself. The first M.F.1 F.2 was launched on 26 May 1915 and tested on the water in Horten harbour. The first flight of the M.F.1 occurred on 4 June 1915 when Captain Halfdan Gyth Dehli made two flights in the aircraft. The type was armed with one Krag–Jørgensen carbine with 120 rounds and one Colt M1911 pistol. The M.F.1 had a 100–130 horsepower Hall-Scott eight-cylinder engine and a top speed of 100 km/h (62 mph).

Three M.F.1s were operated by the Royal Norwegian Navy Air Service's First Aerial Group based at the Royal Norwegian Navy's main base at Karljohansvern in Horten between 4 August 1915 and 15 July 1918. Three aircraft were built in 1915 (F.2, F.4 and F.6) one in 1916, F.8 and one in 1917 F.8 (II). The first four were lost in accidents in the period 1916–1918. The last aircraft of the type to be built, F.8 (II), was constructed to replace the original F.8, which had crashed at Karljohansvern on 20 May 1916 due to engine failure. F.8 (II), delivered on 2 June 1917, was rebuilt to type M.F.4 with new wings and nacelle in the autumn of 1918 and decommissioned on 13 July 1922 after flying for 322 hours and 15 minutes.

== Specifications ==
Data from Marinens Flygevåpen 1912–1944.

General characteristics

- Crew: 2
- Length: 9.7 m (31 ft 10 in)
- Wingspan: 19.02 m (62 ft 5 in)
- Height: 3.9 m (12 ft 10 in)
- Empty weight: 980 kg (2,161 lb)
- Gross weight: 1,340 kg (2,954 lb)
- Powerplant: 1 × Hall-Scott A-4 V-8 water-cooled piston engine, 97 kW (130 hp)
- Propellers: 4-bladed wooden fixed-pitch propeller

Performance

- Maximum speed: 100 km/h (62 mph, 54 kn)
- Cruise speed: 80 km/h (50 mph, 43 kn)
- Range: 480 km (300 mi, 260 nmi)
- Rate of climb: 0.8 m/s (160 ft/min)

Armament

- 1 × Krag–Jørgensen carbine
- 1 × Colt M1911 pistol

== Bibliography ==
- Hafsten, Bjørn; Tom Arheim (2003). Marinens Flygevåpen 1912–1944 (in Norwegian). Oslo: TankeStreken AS. ISBN 82-993535-1-3.
- Henriksen, Vera (1994). Fra opptakt til nederlag. Luftforsvarets historie (in Norwegian). Vol. 1. Oslo: Aschehoug. ISBN 82-03-22068--1.
