= Marinens Flyvebaatfabrikk M.F.4 =

Retired floatplane retired in 1924

General information
- Type: Trainer
- Manufacturer: Marinens Flyvebaatfabrikk
- Primary user: Royal Norwegian Navy Air Service
- Number built: 6

History
- Manufactured: 1918–1921
- Introduction date: 1918
- First flight: 13 March 1918
- Retired: 2 October 1924
- Developed from: Marinens Flyvebaatfabrikk M.F.1

The Marinens Flyvebaatfabrikk M.F.4 was a biplane floatplane built by the Royal Norwegian Navy Air Service aircraft factory Marinens Flyvebaatfabrikk from 1918. The aircraft was the first purpose-built trainer aircraft in Norwegian service and served until retired in October 1924.

== Background ==
The M.F.4 was based on the first aircraft model built by Marinens Flyvebaatfabrikk, the Marinens Flyvebaatfabrikk M.F.1, and was intended to replace the latter on a 1 to 1 basis. Amongst the modifications added to the M.F.4 model was such changes as a monoplane tail section and a shorter wingspan.

== Production ==
The M.F.4 was manufactured at Marinens Flyvebaatsfabrikk's facility in Horten from 1918, the production of the trainer aircraft necessitating an expansion of the aircraft factory and the construction of a new workshop. A total of six aircraft were manufactured between 1918 and 1921. Two of the M.F.4s were constructed in 1918 by converting M.F.1 airframes. The first M.F.4 aircraft built, F.2 (II), was equipped with a Renault 130 hp V-8 engine until rebuilt with a 110 hp (82 kW) Scania-Vabis PD engine on 22 July 1918. The other five aircraft of the type built were all powered by the Scania-Vabis engine. The last M.F.4 to be manufactured, F.12A (II), was first test flown on 7 April 1921.

== Service ==
The type's first flight occurred on 13 March 1918, when F.2 (II) was test flown by the Marinens Flyvebaatfabrikk. The M.F.4 was the first purpose-built trainer aircraft in service with the Royal Norwegian Navy Air Service; the M.F.1s that had been used up until then having to be improvised in order to perform the trainer task.

In 1920 the Royal Norwegian Navy Air Service and the civilian air company Det Norske Luftfartrederi cooperated on starting the first experimental civilian passenger/post route in Norway. Initiated by the Norwegian postal service, the route was flown between the port cities of Horten, Kristiania and Kristiansand. When the Supermarine Channel flying boats employed on the route suffered technical malfunctions, other military seaplanes took over several flights. Amongst the aircraft used were the M.F.4.

By the early 1920s the M.F.4 aircraft, and the preceding M.F.1, were outdated and unsuited for the service they were supposed to perform. In one accident the M.F.4 flown by the head of the Royal Norwegian Navy Air Service's flying school lost its wings. The replacement for the M.F.4, the Marinens Flyvebaatfabrikk M.F.6, had its first flight on 3 April 1920. Even though outdated, the M.F.4 remained the most flown aircraft in the Royal Norwegian Navy Air Service's inventory until retired in October 1924.

During the type's close to six years of service, three of the six aircraft were written off in crashes. No aviators were killed or injured flying the M.F.4. The last of the M.F.4s, F.6 (II), was removed from service on 2 October 1924, having flown a total of 489 hours and 40 minutes.

== Specifications ==
Data from Marinens Flygevåpen 1912–1944

General characteristics

- Crew: 2
- Length: 9.9 m (32 ft 6 in)
- Wingspan: 15.6 m (51 ft 2 in)
- Height: 3.6 m (11 ft 10 in)
- Empty weight: 940 kg (2,072 lb)
- Gross weight: 1,390 kg (3,064 lb)
- Powerplant: 1 × Scania-Vabis PD 6-cylinder water-cooled in-line piston engione air-cooled piston engine, 82 kW (110 hp) (97 kW (130 hp) Renault 130hp V-8 - 1st aircraft)
- Propellers: 4-bladed fixed-pitch pusher propeller

Performance

- Maximum speed: 100 km/h (62 mph, 54 kn)
- Cruise speed: 80 km/h (50 mph, 43 kn)
- Range: 250 km (160 mi, 130 nmi)
- Rate of climb: 0.83 m/s (163 ft/min)

== Bibliography ==
- Arheim, Tom (1994). Fra Spitfire til F-16: Luftforsvaret 50 år 1944–1994 (in Norwegian). Oslo: Sem & Stenersen. ISBN 82-7046-068-0.
- Hafsten, Bjørn; Tom Arheim (2003). Marinens Flygevåpen 1912–1944 (in Norwegian). Oslo: TankeStreken AS. ISBN 82-993535-1-3.
