= Marinens Flyvebaatfabrikk M.F.11 =

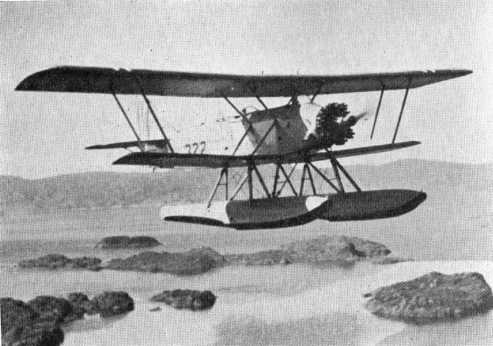

General information
- Type: Maritime reconnaissance
- Manufacturer: Marinens Flyvebaatfabrikk
- Designer: Captain Johan E. Høver
- Primary users: Royal Norwegian Navy Air Service Luftwaffe; Finnish Air Force
- Number built: 29

History
- Manufactured: 1930 – 1939
- Introduction date: 1932
- First flight: 29 September 1931

The Marinens Flyvebaatfabrikk M.F.11 (or Høver M.F.11, for its designer) was a three-seat, single-engine biplane used by the Royal Norwegian Navy Air Service for maritime reconnaissance in the decade before the Second World War.

The M.F.11 was the main aircraft of the Royal Norwegian Navy Air Service (RNoNAS) until the German invasion of Norway in 1940.

== Design and production ==
As the final Hansa Brandenburg W.33 seaplane left the Marinens Flyvebaatfabrikk in Horten in 1929 it was clear a new machine was needed to replace it and in the summer of 1929 Marinens Flyvebaatfabrikk and its chief designer, Captain J.E. Høver were ordered to develop a new seaplane. In cooperation with aircrew and other specialists Høver designed the M.F.11 in little over a year, during which several foreign designs were also evaluated, and by 11 October 1930 the Norwegian Ministry of Defence ordered the M.F.11, as a "self-defence scout plane".

The pilots wanted a monoplane, but as the RNoNAS demanded that it have a maximum wingspan of 15.4 m (51 ft), to fit into existing hangars, a biplane configuration was thought necessary.

The fuselage of the M.F.11 was made of welded steel tubes and wood formers, covered with doped canvas. Crew members used gosport tubes for communication.

Its first flight was on 29 September 1931, equipped with the British Armstrong Siddeley Panther II radial engine, the first 14 of which were made in the United Kingdom. From 1934 license manufacturing of the engine began in Norway at Marinens Minevesen in Horten, with F.314 being the first aircraft equipped with a Norwegian-made engine. As the Norwegian power plants were installed they proved to be of superior quality to the British originals. Production ended in 1938 as imported engines became available at a low cost after being retired by the British. Twenty-nine aircraft were produced.

== The M.F.11 in Norwegian service ==
=== Pre-war service ===
The M.F.11 entered service with the RNoNAS in 1932 and was used for numerous tasks along the coast of Norway and in Norwegian territorial waters.

After the outbreak of the Second World War in 1939, this included military exercises, searching for mines and missing ships, while being stationed at coastal fortifications to provide reconnaissance flights. When the Germans invaded, some aircraft had accumulated close to 900 hours of flight time. Shortly before the war the Royal Norwegian Navy Air Service decided on a replacement for the M.F.11, and 24 Northrop N-3PBs were ordered in March 1940 from the US but none arrived before the Germans invaded.

=== Trøndelag Naval District ===
M.F.11s saw active service along Norwegian coastlines following the German invasion. An M.F.11 was among the first Norwegian units to make contact with the invasion forces when on 8 April 1940 an aircraft of the Trøndelag Naval District was dispatched to the Kornstadfjord near Lyngstad in Eide Municipality where a German Arado Ar 196 had made an emergency landing. After the German aircrew approached locals trying to purchase fuel they were captured by some civilians before being transferred to the custody of police officers. The crew of the M.F.11 transported the Germans and their Arado to Kristiansund for internment. The Arado had been catapult launched from the German cruiser Admiral Hipper.

=== Romsdalsfjord Air Group ===
The Air Group's composition – One of the Norwegian air units in which the M.F.11 saw action was the improvised Romsdalsfjord Air Group (Norwegian: Romsdalsfjordgruppa). The air group eventually consisted of four aircraft; an M.F.11 originally from Trøndelag Naval District, the Arado Ar 196 captured at Lyngstad, and two ex-Fleet Air Arm Supermarine Walrus amphibians. The first 700 Naval Air Squadron Walrus was released by Norwegian authorities after having been interned in Kristiansund on 8 April after failing to return to the battleship HMS Rodney. The other arrived in Molde on 13 April to inform the Royal Norwegian Navy of the imminent arrival of the RN task force whose crew decided to temporarily join the Romsdalsfjord Air Group. The air group was based out of Eidsøra, where the newly built school was used as a barracks and the local rifle association provided a guard force of around twenty-five officers and men for observation of air or naval activity, which was kept supplied with food and other supplies by a group of local women.

Operations – The Romsdalsfjord Air Group was restricted to scouting the coast of Romsdal for enemy forces because the group had only 2,000 rounds of machine gun ammunition, no tracer ammunition or bombs and only fuel for a few days if all four planes were used. On 12 April, the M.F.11 reported the position of two German merchant vessels, which helped RNoN warships including HNoMS Sleipner seize the German ships that day. Contact with German forces was seldom but on one reconnaissance mission over Trøndelag, the M.F.11 came under fire from German aircraft, but escaped with minimal damage. The only real combat involving the air group occurred off Vigra on 14 April when the M.F.11 encountered a German Heinkel He 115 and exchanged fire with it however neither the German or the Norwegian aircraft scored any hits, and the He 115 then escaped northwards and the M.F.11 lacked the speed to keep up.

Escape to the UK – On 17 April, the RNoN Commander decided that the four aircraft would be evacuated as fuel reserves for only five to six hours flying time remained. The plan was for the Norwegians to return with better aircraft and supplies. At 0330hrs the next day the Arado Ar 196 departed first with a crew of three, to Shetland and landed safely around 0630. As the air group had only two sets of maps the M.F.11 had to fly in formation with the two Walrus' planes. When they approached Orkney the M.F.11 was lagging behind the Walruses and was intercepted by three Scapa Flow Gloster Gladiators which attacked the M.F 11. Luckily for the Norwegians, they managed to put down on the water. Although their aircraft was hit by forty to fifty rounds the crew were uninjured. After this friendly fire episode the Norwegians were welcomed and reported the situation in the Romsdal area to the British commanders. The Arado attracted attention amongst the British, it was flown to Helensburgh where it would be examined and tested, however it sank during the landing. Even though the Norwegians wished to return to continue the fight, none of them made it back in time before fighting ended.

== Use in Finland ==
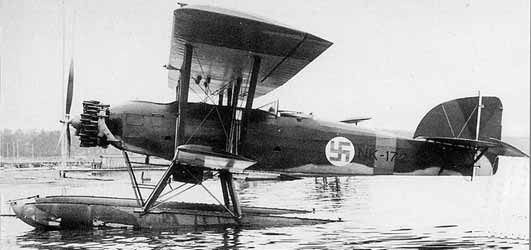
Finnish Air Force Høver M.F.11 NK-172 (ex-Norwegian F.336) during the Continuation War.

As the Norwegian Campaign was ending in June 1940, Norwegian pilots were ordered to prevent their aircraft from falling into German hands. Most of the Norwegian He 115s escaped to the UK, but three M.F.11s and one He 115 couldn't make that trip, and flying to Finland was the only option.

On 8 June 1940, three M.F.11s landed on Salmijärvi Lake in Petsamo, and were interned by Finnish authorities. They were first stored and repaired at the Finnish Polytechnic School and the Finnish State Aircraft Factory before being handed over to the Lentolaivue 15 in August 1941. All three M.F.11s were fitted with shackles for 200 kg (440 lb) depth charges.

During the autumn of 1941, the aircraft carried out around 20 reconnaissance and propaganda missions in the Lake Ladoga area before ice conditions ended flying and they were put into winter storage. The aircraft were also used during the Continuation War to support long-range patrols behind Soviet lines.

During the summer of 1942, the three aircraft were operated by Lentolaivue 6 from Mariehamn, Åland on anti-submarine missions over the Baltic. At two occasions during the summer, Soviet submarines were attacked, without observable results.

During the summers of 1943 and 1944, similar types of missions were flown over the Baltic but, at least in part due to an anti-submarine net having been positioned across the Gulf of Finland, no submarines were spotted. The Baltic missions ended on 21 August 1944. Following the Moscow Armistice on 4 September 1944, the M.F.11s were sent to Detachment Jauri in the far north of Finland to participate in the Lapland War, flying roughly 60 transport missions in October. In November 1944, the M.F.11s were put into permanent storage.

In Finnish service the M.F.11s were given the designation numbers NK-171 to 173, after the Finnish abbreviation for "Norwegian Machine" ("norjalainen kone").

Two of the Finnish-operated M.F.11s were offered for sale in 1948 and 1950, but lack of interest resulting in them being scrapped.

== German-operated M.F.11s ==
The German invasion forces captured as many as 16 Norwegian M.F.11s. The aircraft were seized in repair shops and air bases around the country, along with several examples at the factory in Horten.

The captured aircraft were likely used for communications and mail flights supporting the German occupation of Norway. German records show M.F.11s being brought in for maintenance as late as February 1942.

The Germans operated them from Finnmark in the north of Norway to Warnemünde in the north east of Germany.

== Users ==
Finland

- Finnish Air Force – (Three aircraft) Norwegian aircraft that were interned in June 1940 after evacuating from North Norway to Petsamo

Germany

- Luftwaffe – Up to 16 captured Norwegian aircraft used to support the German occupation of Norway

Norway

- Royal Norwegian Navy Air Service – (25 aircraft)

== Specifications (Finnish Air Force Høver M.F.11) ==
Data from Warplanes of the Second World War Vol. 6 : Floatplanes

General characteristics

- Crew: three
- Length: 11.72 m (38 ft 5 in)
- Wingspan: 15.4 m (50 ft 6 in)
- Height: 4.45 m (14 ft 7 in)
- Wing area: 53.5 m^{2} (576 sq ft)
- Empty weight: 1,850 kg (4,079 lb)
- Max takeoff weight: 2,850 kg (6,283 lb)
- Powerplant: 1 × Armstrong Siddeley Panther IIA 14-cylinder air-cooled radial piston engine, 429 kW (575 hp)
- Propellers: 2-bladed wooden fixed-pitch propeller

Performance

- Maximum speed: 235 km/h (146 mph, 127 kn) at 850 m (2,790 ft)

214 km/h (133 mph; 116 kn) at sea level

- Cruise speed: 170 km/h (110 mph, 92 kn)
- Range: 800 km (500 mi, 430 nmi)
- Service ceiling: 4,999 m (16,401 ft)
- Time to altitude:

- 1,000 m (3,300 ft) in 3 minutes 5 seconds
- 2,000 m (6,600 ft) in 7 minutes 7 seconds
- 3,000 m (9,800 ft) in 14 minutes

Armament

- Guns: *1 - 2 × 7.7 mm (.303 in) M1919 Browning machine gun or 1 × 7.92 mm (0.312 in) M1919 Browning machine gun fixed on the central part of the upper wing.
- 1× 7.7 mm (.303 in) M1919 Browning machine gun or 7.92 mm (0.312 in) M1919 Browning machine gun in the gunner position
- 1× Oerlikon 20 mm cannon Autocannon Gun pod mounted on the left wing (one example only).
- Bombs: *3 × 100 kg (220 lb) bombs or depth charges mounted under the fuselage

or

- 4 × 50 kg (110 lb) bombs mounted under the fuselage

or

- 1 × 200 kg (440 lb) bomb or depth charge (Finnish modification)

== See also ==
Related lists

- List of aircraft of World War II
- List of military aircraft of Norway

== Bibliography ==
- Hafsten, Bjørn; Arheim, Tom (2003). Marinens Flygevåpen 1912–1944 (in Norwegian). Oslo: TankeStreken AS. ISBN 82-993535-1-3.
- Hafsten, Bjørn; Ulf Larsstuvold; Bjørn Olsen; Sten Stenersen (2005). Flyalarm – luftkrigen over Norge 1939–1945 (in Norwegian) (2nd, revised ed.). Oslo: Sem og Stenersen AS. ISBN 82-7046-074-5.
- Heinonen, Timo: Thulinista Hornetiin, 1992, Keski-Suomen ilmailumuseo, ISBN 951-95688-2-4 (in Finnish)
- Kjæraas, Arild (ed.): Profiles in Norway no. 2: Høver M.F.11, Profiles in Norway, Andebu 2003 (in English and Norwegian)
- Sivertsen, Svein Carl (ed.): Jageren Sleipner i Romsdalsfjord sjøforsvarsdistrikt april 1940, Sjømilitære Samfund ved Norsk Tidsskrift for Sjøvesen, Hundvåg 1999 ISBN 82-994738-3-7 (in Norwegian)
