= Einar Sem-Jacobsen =

Norwegian military officer, engineer and aviation pioneer

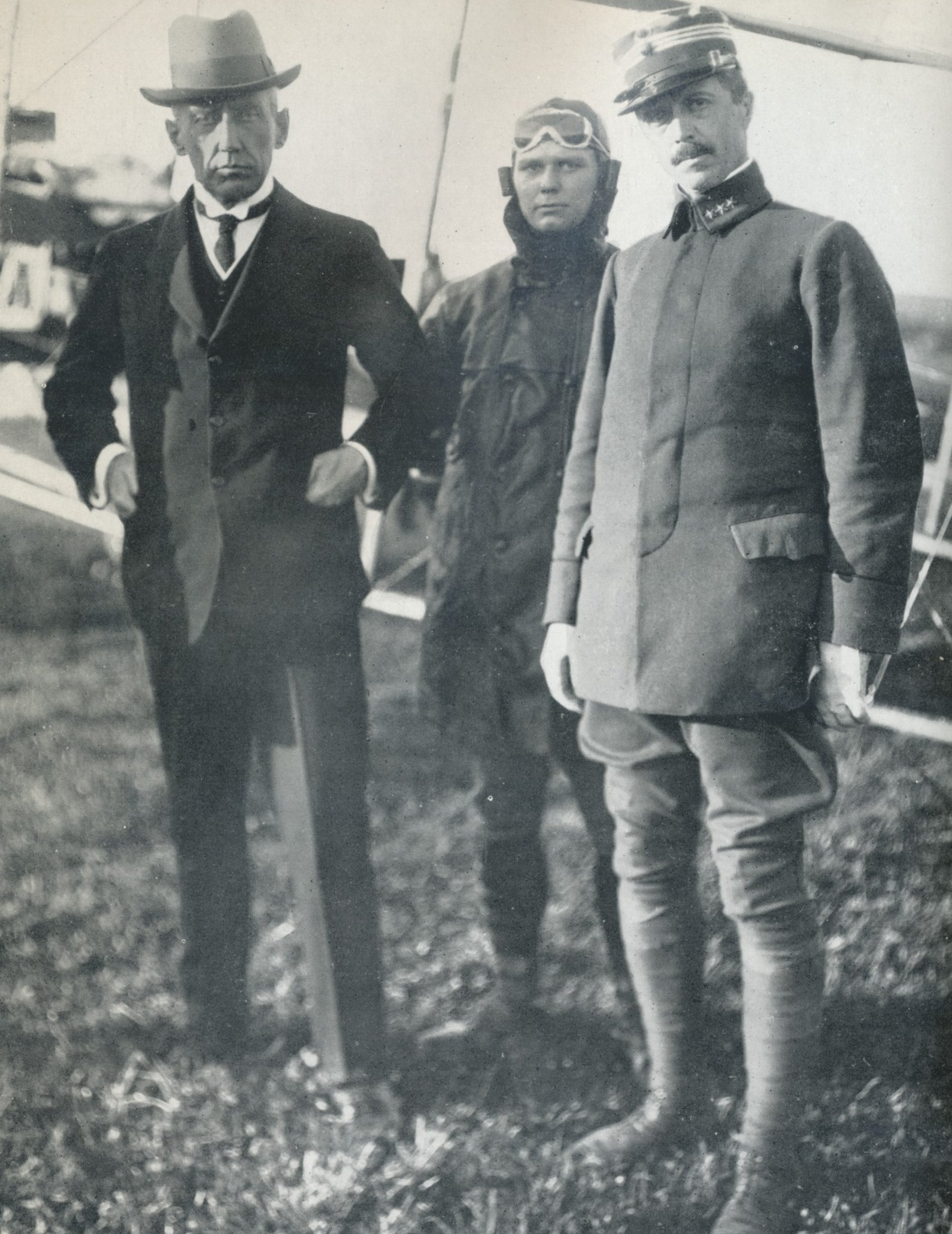
Einar Sem-Jacobsen (to the right) Roald Amundsen to the left

Einar Sem-Jacobsen (3 August 1878 – 15 October 1936) was a Norwegian military officer, engineer and aviation pioneer.

Einar Olaf Sem-Jacobsen was born in Kristiania (now Oslo), Norway. He graduated in 1896 from the Norwegian Military Academy and joined the engineering corp of the Norwegian Army in 1899. He was promoted to Captain in 1911 and Major in 1930. He co-founded the society Norwegian Airways Association (Norsk Luftseiladsforening) in 1909. From 1910 to 11, Sem-Jacobsen attended aeronautical engineering studies in Paris. He was the manager of the Army Air Force Factory (Kjeller Flyfabrikk) at Kjeller Airport in Skedsmo from 1916 to 1922. He subsequently returned to the engineering corp.

In 1926, he was discharged from the air force. From 1930 until his death in 1936, he was an aerotechnical consultant for the maritime testing, inspection and research facility, Det norske Veritas.
