= Marinens Flyvebaatfabrikk =

Norwegian aircraft manufacturing company from 1915 to 1940

Marinens Flyvebaatfabrikk - The Navy's Flying Boat Factory - was the Royal Norwegian Navy Air Service' aeroplane manufacturer. It was established in Horten in 1915 and produced 120 aircraft from then until it ceased to exist in 1940.

== Aircraft produced ==
=== Local designs ===
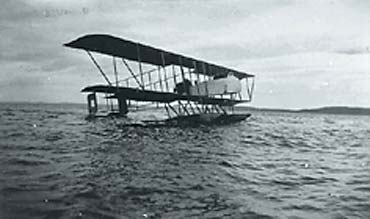
The M.F. 1 - the first aircraft manufactured by Marinens Flyvebaatfabrikk

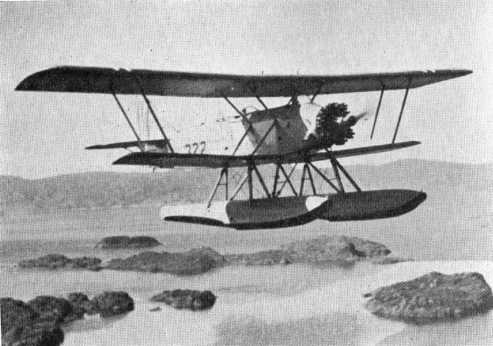
The M.F.11 - the last aircraft in regular production at Marinens Flyvebaatfabrikk

- M.F.1, a development of the Maurice Farman MF.7 floatplane, type 1914, six built.
- M.F.2, a development of the Maurice Farman MF.11 floatplane, could carry two 50 kg mines/bombs, radio and machine gun.
- M.F.3, further development of the MF.11, carried out the first RNoN aircraft test with torpedoes.
- M.F.4, the first purpose-built trainer aircraft also developed from the Farman MF.11
- M.F.5, the first Norwegian tractor aircraft
- M.F.6. a trainer and the last Farman pusher built by the factory
- M.F.7, trainer
- 8 M.F.8, trainer
- 10 M.F.9, fighter
- 4 M.F.10, trainer
- 29 M.F.11, reconnaissance
- 1 M.F.12, monoplane trainer

=== Built under license ===
- 8 Sopwith Baby
- 7 Douglas DT-2B/C
- Hansa-Brandenburg Make, a licence-built Hansa-Brandenburg W.33
  - 6 Make I
  - 24 Make II
  - 11 Make III built at Kjeller Flyfabrikk as the Kjeller F.F.8 Make III.

== External links and references ==
- History of the Royal Norwegian Air Force (in Norwegian)
- Polish page about Norwegian airplanes (in Polish)
