= Douglas DT =

American naval torpedo bomber

DT
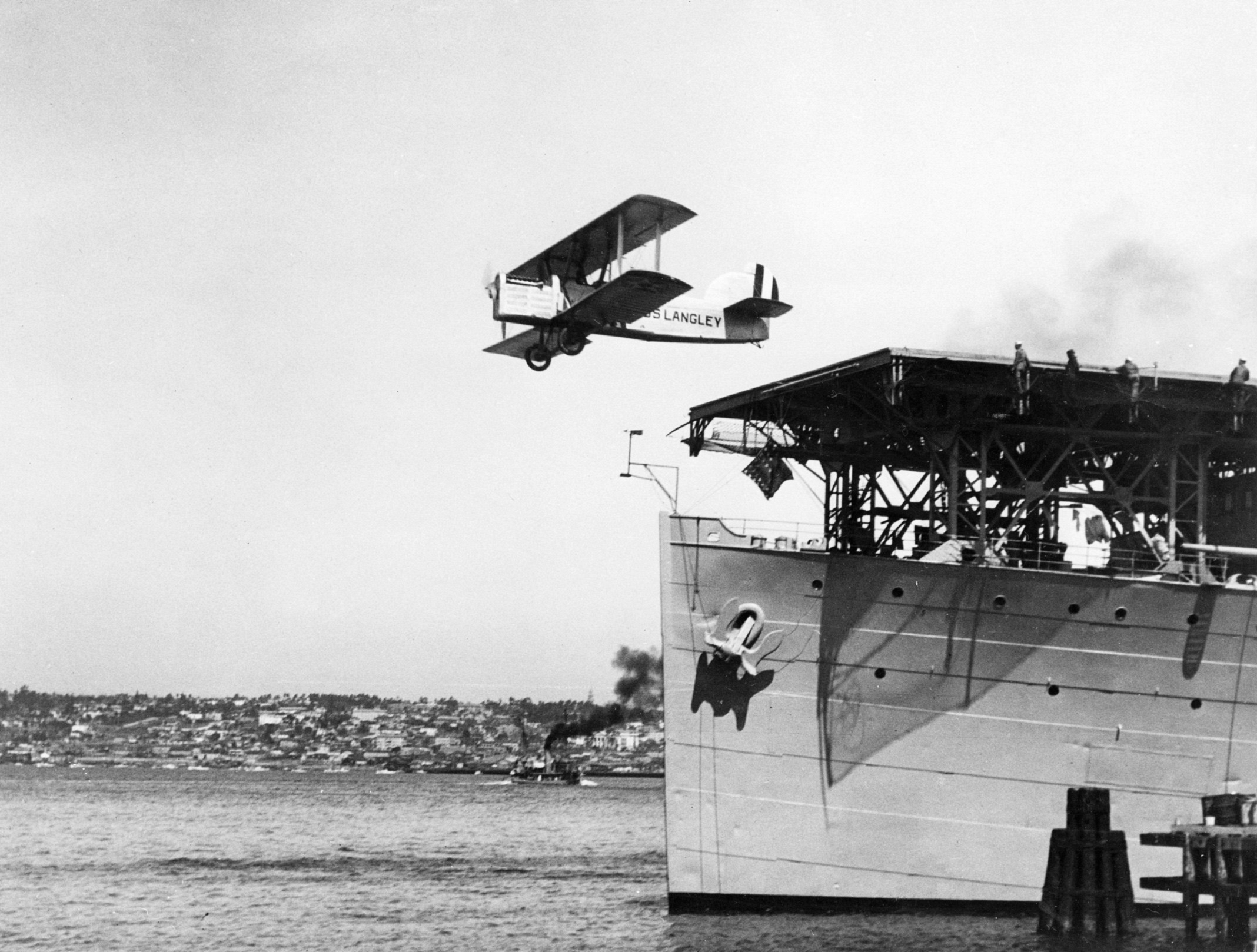
- Douglas DT-2 launched from USS Langley, San Diego, California

General information
- Type: Torpedo bomber
- Manufacturer: Douglas Aircraft Company
- Primary user: United States Navy
- Number built: 90

History
- Manufactured: 1921–1929
- First flight: November 1921
- Variant: Douglas World Cruiser

The Douglas DT bomber was the Douglas Aircraft Company's first military contract, forging a link between the company and the United States Navy. Navy Contract No. 53305 of April 1, 1921, required only 18 pages to set out the specifications that resulted in the purchase of three DT (D for Douglas, T for torpedo) folding-wing aircraft.

The DT used a welded steel fuselage with aluminum covering the forward and center sections and fabric covering the rear section. Douglas built 46 DT-1 and DT-2 torpedo bombers for the U.S. Navy, Norwegian Navy, and Peruvian Navy. 20 DT-2 aircraft were built under license by the L-W-F Engineering Company Inc., six by the Naval Aircraft Factory (NAF), and 11 by the Dayton-Wright Company. Another seven were built for Norway under license by Marinens Flyvebåtfabrik. Although still in service when the Germans invaded Norway, the Norwegian DTs did not see action in the Norwegian Campaign. The DT could be fitted either with pontoons or wheeled landing gear and could carry a 1,800 lb (816 kg) torpedo.

The first flight was in November 1921 and production continued until 1929. The DT operated off the U.S. Navy's first aircraft carrier, USS Langley, from land bases, and from seaplane tenders. Several were flown by the Marine Corps.

Variations of the DT-2 aircraft were designated DT-4, DT-5, DT-6, and DTB. Machines licence-built by Dayton-Wright were internally designated SDW by that company. The type became the basis for the Douglas World Cruiser.

== Variants ==
DT-1
Preproduction prototypes; three built.

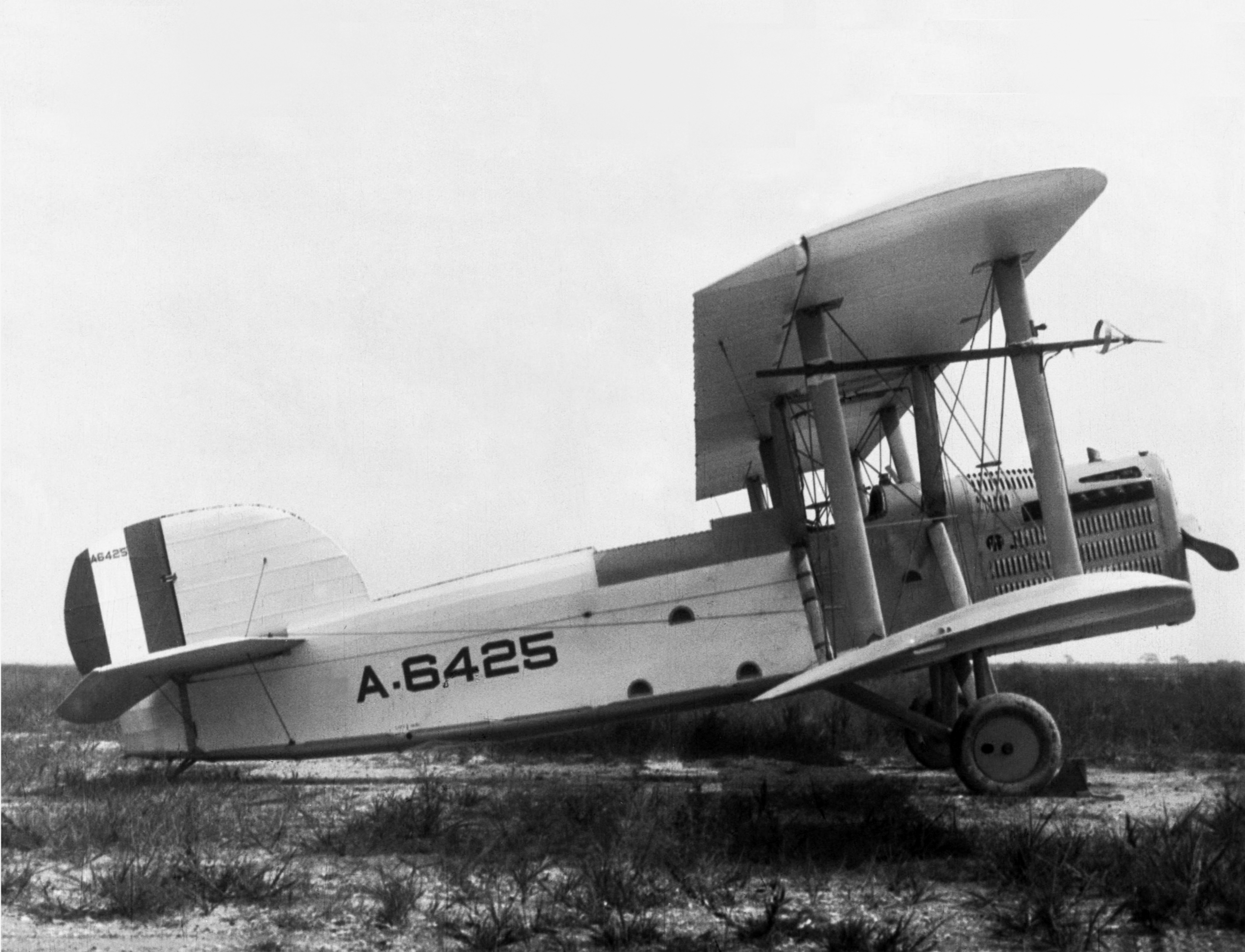
Douglas DT-2 at Langley

DT-2
Two-seat torpedo-bomber biplane, powered by a 450 hp (340 kW) Liberty V-12 piston engine; 87 built.
DT-3
Proposed version of the DT-2. Not built.
DT-4
Four DT-2s converted into bomber aircraft by the Naval Aircraft Factory. The aircraft were fitted with direct-drive Wright T-2 V-12 engines.
DT-5
Redesignation of two DT-4s fitted with a geared 650 hp (480 kW) Wright T-2B V-12 engine.
DT-6
One DT-2 aircraft fitted with a 450 hp (340 kW) Wright P-1 radial piston engine.
DT-2B
This designation was given to one DT-2 aircraft supplied to the Norwegian government. Seven similar aircraft were built under licence in Norway.
DTB
Export version for Peru. Four aircraft built for the Peruvian navy, fitted with 650 hp (480 kW) Wright Typhoon V-12 piston engines.
SDW-1
Redesignation of three DT-2s modified by the Dayton-Wright company.

== Operators ==
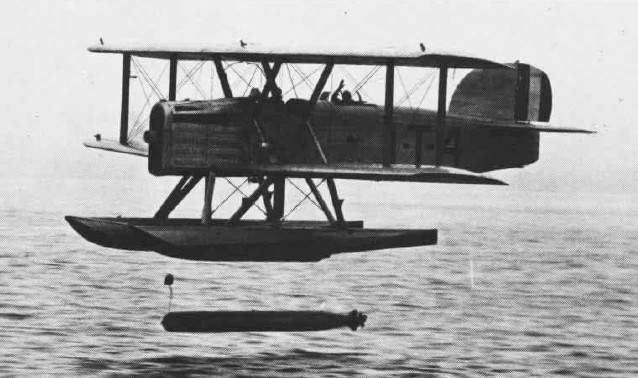
A Douglas DT of the U.S. Navy dropping a torpedo.

Norway

- Royal Norwegian Navy Air Service

Peru

- Peruvian Navy

United States

- United States Marine Corps
- United States Navy

== Specifications (DT-2 floatplane) ==
Data from McDonnell Douglas Aircraft since 1920 Vol.1.

General characteristics

- Crew: two
- Length: 38 ft 9 in (11.8 m)
- Wingspan: 51 ft 10 in (15.8 m)
- Height: 15 ft 1 in (4.60 m)
- Wing area: 707 sq ft (65.7 m^{2})
- Empty weight: 4,528 lb (2,054 kg)
- Gross weight: 7,293 lb (3,308 kg)
- Powerplant: 1 × Liberty L-12 V-12 water-cooled piston engine, 450 hp (340 kW)
- Propellers: 2-bladed wooden propeller

Performance

- Maximum speed: 100 mph (160 km/h, 87 kn)
- Range: 274 mi (441 km, 238 nmi)
- Service ceiling: 7,400 ft (2,300 m)
- Rate of climb: 345 ft/min (1.75 m/s)
- Time to altitude: 14.5 min to 5,000 ft (1,524 m)
- Wing loading: 10.3 lb/sq ft (50 kg/m^{2})
- Power/mass: 0.0617 hp/lb (0.1 kW/kg)

Armament

- Guns: 1× 0.30 in (7.62 mm) M1919 Browning machine gun
- Bombs: 1× 1,835 lb (832 kg) aerial torpedo

== See also ==
Related development

- Douglas World Cruiser
