= Halfdan Gyth Dehli =

Norwegian businessperson and aviator

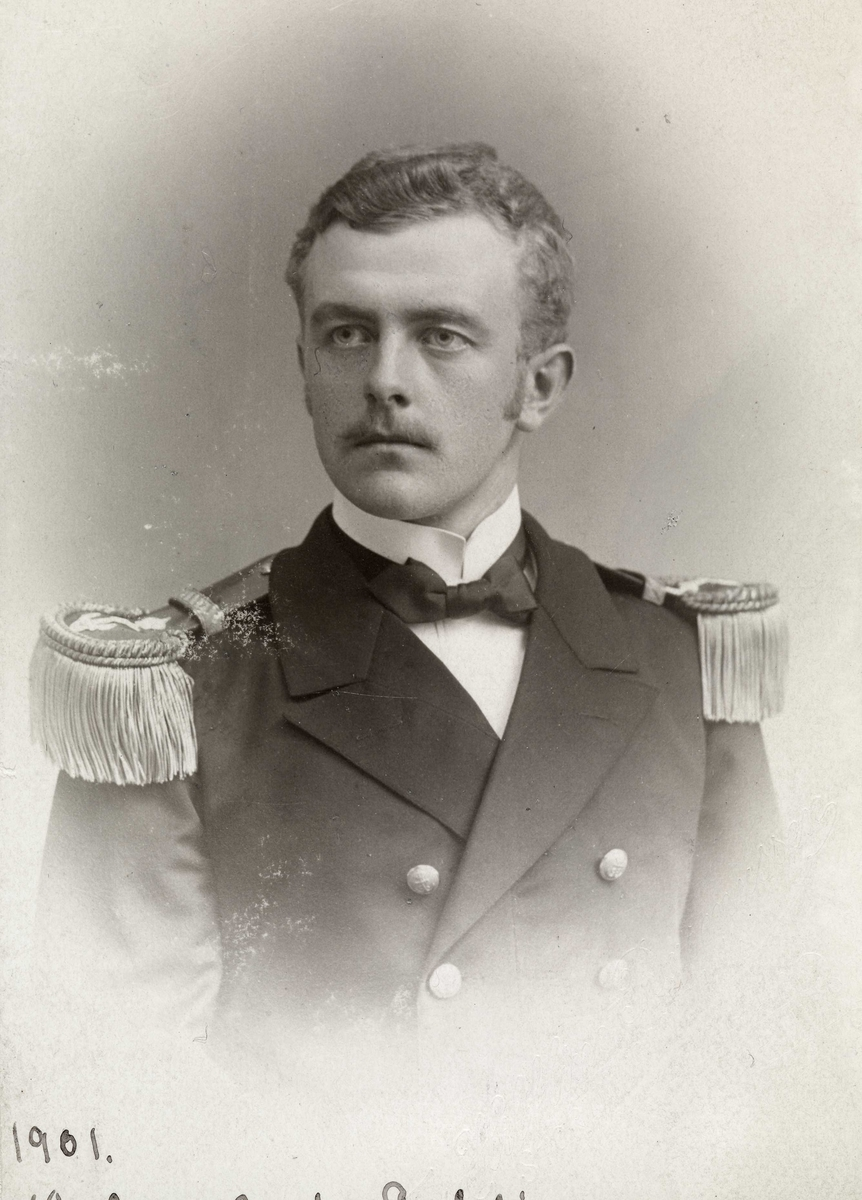
HalfdanGythDehli

Halfdan Gyth Dehli (15 June 1881 – 22 August 1963) was a Norwegian businessperson and aviator.

He was a son of barrister Ole Dehli (1851–1924) and women's health pioneer Maria Dehli, née Gyth (1851–1926). His sister Bergljot was married to Colonel Jacob Ager Laurantzon, and through them he was an uncle of Trygve Dehli Laurantzon.

He is best known as the director of Marinens Flyvebaatfabrikk from 1916 to 1918, and had also performed the first flight with its first aircraft M.F.1 in 1915. From 1918 to 1923 Gyth Dehli was a technical director in Det Norske Luftfartsrederi. He later settled as a farmer in Stange Municipality, then later moved to Lillehammer.

During the occupation of Norway by Nazi Germany he was imprisoned in Grini concentration camp from 13 to 21 January 1942.
