= Royal Norwegian Navy Air Service =

Royal Norwegian Navy Air Service (RNNAS)
- Marinens flygevåpen
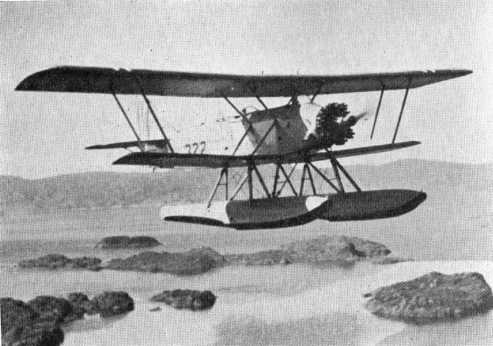
- The RNoNAS' main aircraft in 1940 - the Marinens Flyvebaatfabrikk M.F.11
- Active: 1912 to 10 November 1944
- Allegiance: Norway
- Branch: Royal Norwegian Navy
- Engagements: Second World War: Norwegian Campaign; Battle of the Atlantic

The Royal Norwegian Navy Air Service (Norwegian: Marinens flygevåpen) was alongside the Norwegian Army Air Service the forerunner to the modern-day Royal Norwegian Air Force.

== History ==
The RNNAS was established on 1 June 1912, with the maiden flight of the HNoMS Start, piloted by Hans Dons. The founding of the Air Service was based largely on pride. On 19 April 1912 newspapers had reported that a Swedish pilot was planning to fly over Moss and Horten. Horten was the site of the main base of the Royal Norwegian Navy. Three officers of the Norwegian submarine Kobben decided that it would be a shame if they were not able to beat him to it.

Later that year, the Maurice Farman biplanes Njaal and Gange Rolf were purchased.

In 1915 the Navy established its own aircraft factory and a flying school.

The main flight base was established in Horten. Other naval air stations were established in Kristiansand in 1918, Bergen in 1919 and in Tromsø shortly before the invasion in 1940.

=== Second World War ===
==== The Norwegian Campaign ====
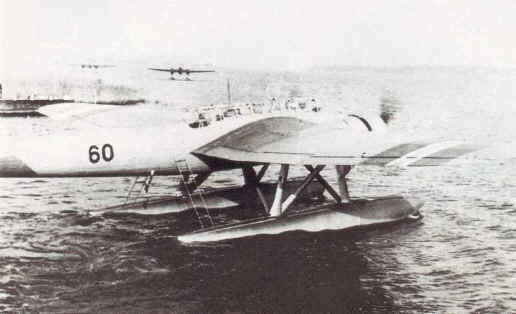
Norwegian He 115Ns in 1939-1940

In 1940 most of the planes in Norwegian service were outdated, and the 1 100 transport and fighter planes of the Luftwaffe soon gained air superiority. The armed resistance in Norway was abandoned 9 June 1940, although some Norwegians would continue the fight abroad. The aircraft of the Norwegian Naval Airforce were the only ones which had the range to fly all the way from the remaining bases in Northern Norway to Britain. Amongst the Norwegian aircraft which reached Britain were four German made Heinkel He 115 sea planes, a fifth escaping to Finland. Three Marinens Flyvebaatfabrikk M.F.11 maritime reconnaissance aircraft also made it to Finland, landing on Lake Salmijärvi in Petsamo on 8 June. Six He 115s were bought before the war, and another two were captured from the Germans during the Norwegian Campaign. A captured Arado Ar 196 from the German heavy cruiser Admiral Hipper was also flown from Norway to Britain for testing.

==== The RNNAS in exile ====
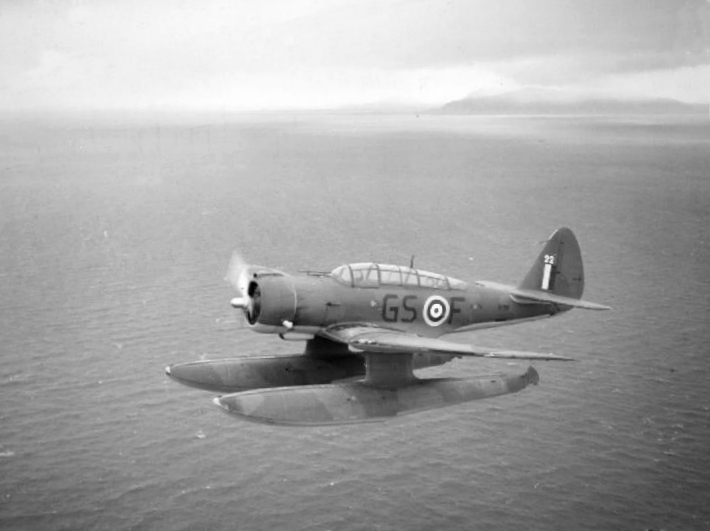
A Northrop N3P-B, 22 'GS-F', of No. 330 (Norwegian) Squadron based at Akureyri, Iceland, in flight over the North Atlantic Ocean

The Army and Navy air forces established themselves in Britain under the command of the Joint Chiefs of Staff. Norwegian air and ground crews operated as part of the British Royal Air Force, both in wholly Norwegian squadrons, and in others. The first exile air unit was the 330 Squadron equipped with Northrop torpedo-bombers. This squadron was established in the autumn of 1940 and was operating from Akureyri, Iceland, from July 1941. On 28 January 1943 the entire squadron relocated to Oban, Scotland where it began to re-equip with Short Sunderlands. The second maritime squadron was the 333 squadron established in 1943 in Woodhaven, Scotland equipped with Catalina sea planes and Mosquito fighter-bombers. At the start of the war, Norwegian personnel received flight training at Toronto, Canada, at Toronto Island Airport. The advantage of this site was its ability to provide both basic flight and seaplane training. Although the airport is located on an island in the harbour, personnel were housed in barracks on the mainland, in a neighbourhood which is still known today as Little Norway. On 10 May 1945 the Mosquitos were formed into a third separate squadron - 334 Squadron. Both planes and running costs were financed by the exiled Norwegian government.

== The Royal Norwegian Air Force ==
The Royal Norwegian Navy Air Service ceased to exist on 10 November 1944 when the Royal Norwegian Air Force was established.

In honour of the achievements of the RNoAF Squadrons of the World War II The Royal Norwegian Air Force has maintained the RAF squadron names. Thus Norway still has 330 and 333 squadrons, respectively flying Sea King helicopters and Orion Maritime Patrol Aircraft. 334 Squadron is currently deactivated and is going to reform with NH90 utility helicopters sometime in 2007.

== See also ==
- Marinens Flyvebaatfabrikk
- Norwegian Army Air Service

== Bibliography ==
- Gulli, Stein (August 1994). "L'aviation navale norvégienne, Avril-Juin 1940 (2ème partie)" [Norwegian Naval Aviation, April–June 1940, Part 2]. Avions: Toute l'aéronautique et son histoire (in French) (18): 40–43. ISSN 1243-8650.
