= 1954 Bjørnøya Consolidated PBY Catalina crash =

1954 aviation accident

Bjørnøya Accident
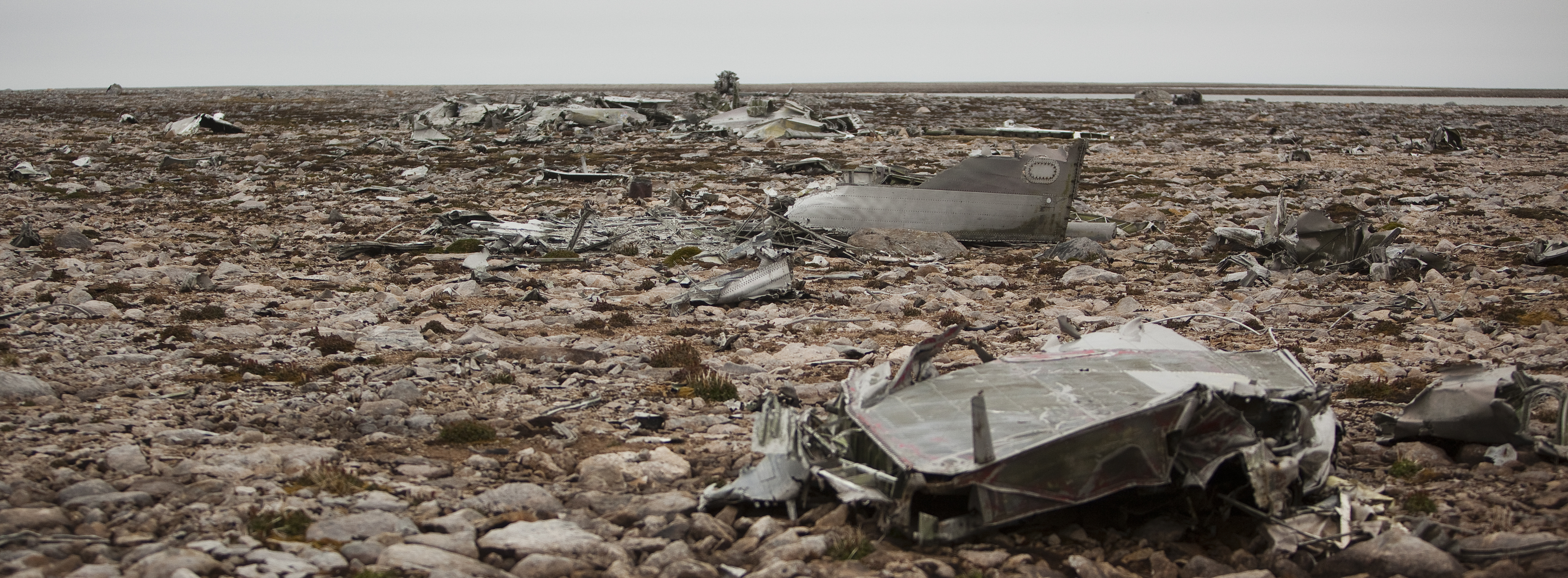
- The crash site of the PBY Catalina

Accident
- Date: 28 March 1954
- Summary: Controlled flight into terrain
- Site: Bjørnøya, Svalbard, Norway; 74.46°N 18.92°E

Aircraft
- Aircraft type: Boeing-Canada PB2B-1 Catalina IVB
- Operator: Royal Norwegian Air Force, 333 Squadron
- Registration: KK-N
- Flight origin: Tromsø Airport, Skattøra
- 1st stopover: Bjørnøya Radio
- 2nd stopover: Isfjord Radio
- 3rd stopover: Longyearbyen
- 4th stopover: Ny-Ålesund
- 5th stopover: Hopen Radio
- Destination: Tromsø Airport, Skattøra
- Passengers: 1
- Crew: 8
- Fatalities: 8
- Survivors: 1

The 1954 Bjørnøya Consolidated PBY Catalina crash (Norwegian: Bjørnøya-ulykken) was a controlled flight into terrain (CFIT) of a Consolidated PBY Catalina on the island of Bjørnøya in Svalbard, Norway, on 28 March 1954 at ca. 15:00. The Royal Norwegian Air Force aircraft of No. 333 Squadron RNoAF (333 Sqn) was conducting a postal drop flight from Tromsø to five settlements on Svalbard, including Bjørnøya Radio, making a low pass over Bjørnøya at a height of 40 meters (130 ft) before crashing into the ground. Only one of the nine on board survived.

The crew at the station set out to find the aircraft in 3 ft (1 m) of snow, and did not manage to bring the survivor back to the station until the following day. Four military ships were dispatched to search for the aircraft. Once it was found, Andenes and Sørøy returned to Tromsø and then took the investigation commission to Bjørnøya. They concluded that the accident was caused by the aircraft losing altitude through a sideslip, possibly due to the pilot losing spatial awareness in the poor visibility.

== Background ==
Svalbard had since its settlement in the early 20th century been entirely isolated from the world during winter, when ice closed its ports. As a trial, the air force carried out a postal delivery expedition in April 1949, dropping mail at Longyearbyen, Ny-Ålesund and Sveagruva. Another flight was carried out the following year, with two more in 1951. The services continued with increasing frequency throughout the 1950s.

The aircraft was a Boeing-Canada PB2B-1 Catalina IVB—a version of the Consolidated PBY Catalina—with construction number 28129 and the Squadron code of KK-N. It was built in 1944 for the United States Navy. The aircraft was sold to Norway after the Second World War ended. It was bought by Vingtor Luftveier of Oslo and registered as LN-OAP on 2 June 1947. The RNoAF bought the aircraft on 15 September 1948. It was originally given the squadron code K-AN, which was later changed to KK-N. The aircraft was part of No. 333 Squadron based at Sola Air Station.

== Flight and crash ==
The flight was a postal delivery flight which was to drop mail at six Norwegian settlements and outposts in Svalbard. The flight plan was to take a load of post from Tromsø Airport, Skattøra and fly a route to drop it at Bjørnøya Radio, Isfjord Radio, Longyearbyen, Ny-Ålesund, Hopen Radio and then fly back via Bjørnøya. The flight had an estimated duration of sixteen hours. It had been delayed for several days because of bad weather. The aircraft was prepared for the flight on 27 March.

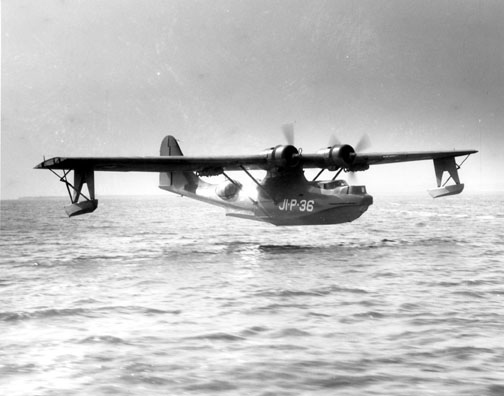
A Catalina similar to the accident aircraft

The aircraft had a crew of eight: three pilots, two navigators, two radio operators and a mechanic. The same crew had been attached to the aircraft and flown it together the past 20 months. In addition there was a passenger, a journalist from the Norwegian Broadcasting Corporation, who was making a radio program about the flight. Originally the broadcaster had appointed Jan Frydenlund to the task, but when it became clear that the flight would be delayed by several days he was replaced by local radio journalist Sigvart Tingvoll.

The aircraft departed Skattøra on 28 March at 01:55. The flight went as planned, with the post being dropped at Bjørnøya and all the other settlements. The surviving crewmember reported that the residents of the various settlements greeted the aircraft enthusiastically at all locations. The weather was generally poor, with low-laying rainclouds. However, there were clear spots in between the clouds which provided pockets of good sight.

On the return leg from Hopen the aircraft followed a route via Bjørnøya, approaching the island from the northeast. At 14:57 it passed at low altitude just west of the station, while it retained radio contact. Minutes later the station lost contact with the aircraft, although the operators there simply presumed that the aircraft's radio had stopped working—a common occurrence at the time. The aircraft was flying at an altitude of only 40 meters (130 ft) above the ground over Bjørnøya. While passing the radio operator on the Catalina had made contact with Bjørnøya Radio. He had attempted to make contact again just before impact, which was thought by the investigation commission to be possibly because the crew had discovered something wrong with the aircraft. This possible problem may have been the cause of the accident. The impact took place 4.5 kilometers (3 mi) south of the station, when the tip of the right wing hit the ground and subsequently the aircraft crashed into the ground in an explosion. The landscape at the accident site is completely flat.

The investigation commission concluded that the accident was caused by the aircraft losing altitude, falling into a sideslip and descending into the ground, first hitting it with the right wingtip. The cause of loss of altitude was unknown, but could either have been part of a sideways banking maneuver or uncontrolled. The varying weather with pockets of good and poor visibility led the commission to believe that the aircraft could have flown into an area with fog and lost sight of the horizon. It reported that the accident took place towards the end of a very long flight and that fatigue could have reduced the pilots' faculties. This could be a decisive pivoting factor in the narrow margins while maneuvering at such low altitudes. The commission found no signs of technical error on the aircraft. It also commented that flying at low altitudes over the sea was common because of the lower wind speeds.

The only person to survive the crash was Paul Olsen, one of the two radio operators. He was sitting in the aircraft's rear in one of the Catalina's side blisters. Upon impact he was ejected 50 meters (160 ft) from the aircraft. Olsen stated that he did not recall anything from the accident and that he initially was unconscious. After waking up he tried calling to the other crew members. He then tried to walk around, but the pain in his foot made this impossible. The aircraft was still on fire and he dared not approach it. Because of the aircraft's poor insulation, Olsen was wearing a leather jacket and a sheepskin sweater, which kept him warm until he was rescued.

== Rescue and investigation ==
The RNoAF initiated rescue preparedness three-quarters of an hour after estimated time of arrival to Skattøra. A distress signal alert was issued by the air traffic control at Skattøra at 18:20. A Catalina was dispatched in a search and rescue mission. It flew the route from Tromsø to Bjørnøya and back that evening. Four Royal Norwegian Navy ships, Andenes and Sørøy and two minesweepers, were dispatched to participate in the operation. Other ships participating in the search were G. O. Sars and Norsel. Allied Forces Northern Europe at Kolsås was alerted and assistance was initiated from the US Third Air Force and the RAF Coastal Command, which were due to arrive at Bodø Main Air Station the following morning.

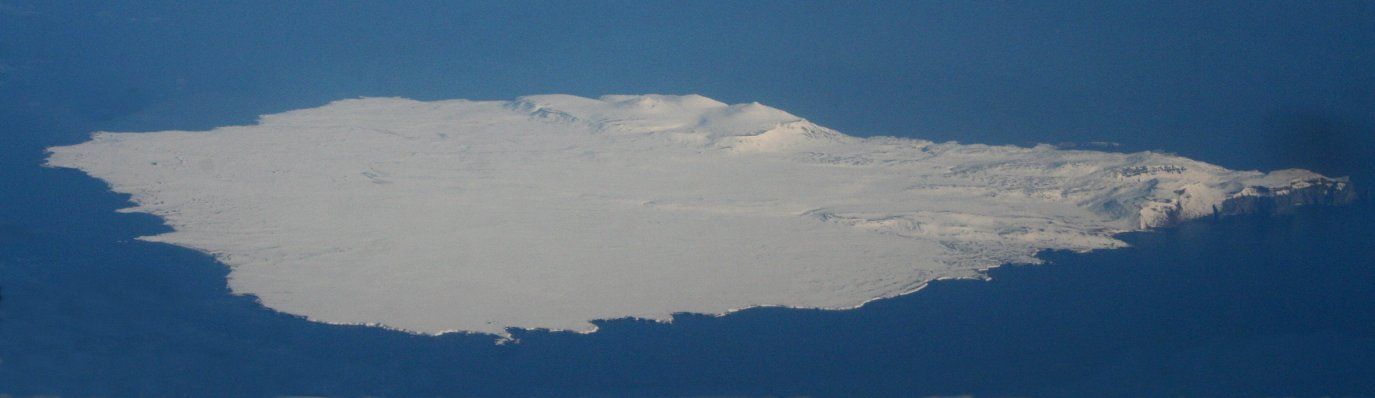
Aerial view of Bjørnøya

The distress call was received by the crew at Bjørnøya Radio and they decided to send two men, Einar Strand and Alv Alvær, to look for the aircraft on the island. After an hour of searching in one meter (3 ft) deep snow, the two spotted the aircraft, which they quickly identified as they saw flames. They arrived three hours after the accident and found Olsen. Strand and Alvær attempted to drag the survivor with them, but this proved too strenuous. Instead Alvær went back to the station and Strand stayed with Olsen. On the return trip Alvær got lost at one time, but finally managed to reach the station. Bjørnøya Radio contacted Skattøra at 21:45 reporting that the wreck had been found.

Strand built an ad hoc sled out of his skis and attempted to drag Olsen on it. It was difficult as Strand was forced to put down his backpack, drag the sled a distance and then return to walk back to bring forth the backpack. As he could not wear his skis, it was a strenuous exercise. The hauling proved futile, and instead Strand decided to return to the station for help. He left his flashlight with Olsen so that he could find him again, although even with this aid relocating the stranded survivor proved difficult, as this part of Bjørnøya is flat and there were no visual references to help orient the searchers. Strand did not return until morning, and Olsen was getting wetter and colder as he waited for help. In the end Olsen decided that further help would not come in time and started following Strand's footsteps, but he soon had to give up, having traversed about 200 meters (660 ft). Three of the four crew at the station returned and transported Olsen to safety. (As the station needed to remain staffed at all times, one of the crew was forced to stay behind.) Olsen reached the station at 13:00 on 29 March.

Andøya and Sørøy were recalled to Tromsø. There they were attached to the investigation commission, led by Major Anonsen. He was assisted by two pilots, a technical officer, a medical doctor and a police officer. Most of the commission was transported by Sørøy, while further supplies and eight coffins were sent by Andenes. Sørøy arrived at Bjørnøya at 23:00 on 29 March, while Andenes arrived on 30 March. Also aboard was a contingent of fifty conscripts who stayed in Bjørnøya for five days. The commission started its work by investigating the wreck and removing the bodies. The deceased were transported to Tromsø, arriving at 13:30 on 1 April. There was a common memorial service at Tromsø before the deceased were transported to their respective hometowns for burial.

== Aftermath ==
The accident was the 333 Squadron's third fatal accident with the Catalinas. It was the first aviation accident in Svalbard and remained the deadliest aviation accident of a civilian nature in the territory until Vnukovo Airlines Flight 2801 in 1996, which killed 141 people. The air force continued on the postal service until 1959. By then a winter airport had been built in Adventdalen outside Longyearbyen and Braathens SAFE took over the postal flights. A memorial plaque with a part of the aircraft's propeller was erected at the station at Bjørnøya on 1 November 1984. The 333 Squadron commemorated the accident on its 50th anniversary in 2004 by flying two Lockheed P-3 Orion aircraft over Bjørnøya and dropping flowers over the site. The wreckage has never been cleaned up and is still located at the crash site.
