= Sola =

Sola may refer to:

== Arts and entertainment ==
=== Music ===
==== Albums ====
- Saints of Los Angeles, a 2008 album by Mötley Crüe
- Sola, an album by Olga Tañón
- Sola, an album by Zayda y los Culpables

==== Songs ====
- "Sola" (Becky G song), 2016
- "Sola" (Francesca Michielin song), 2012
- "Sola" (Héctor el Father song), 2006
- "Sola" (J Balvin song), 2013
- "Sola", a song by Anuel AA
- "Sola", a song by the Cat Empire from Stolen Diamonds
- "Sola", a song by Danna Paola from K.O.
- "Sola", a song by Daniela Romo from her album Amor Prohibido
- "Sola", a song by La India
- "Sola", a song by Irán Castillo from Tatuada en tus besos
- "Sola", a song by Ivy Queen from her 2015 EP Vendetta: Bachata
- "Sola", a song by Leslie Grace
- "Sola", a song by Luis Fonsi from Vida
- "Sola", a song by Jennifer Lopez from her album Como Ama una Mujer
- "Sola", a song by La Oreja de Van Gogh from A las cinco en el Astoria
- "Sola", a song by Manuel Turizo from ADN
- "Sola", a song by Mónica Naranjo from her eponymous album
- "Sola", a song by Playa Limbo

=== Other uses in arts and entertainment ===
- Sola (manga), a 2006 Japanese manga and anime series
- Sola Naberrie, older sister of Padme Amidala in the Star Wars prequel trilogy

== Organizations ==
- SOLA Group, a South African renewable energy infrastructure company

== People ==
=== Surname ===
- Charles Michael Alexis Sola (1786–1857), Italian guitarist and composer mainly resident in England
- Josep Comas i Solà (1868–1937), Spanish astronomer
- Guillermo Solá (1929-2020), Chilean distance runner
- Enrique Sola (born 1986), Spanish footballer
- Sara Solá de Castellanos (1890-?), Argentine poet, novelist, playwright, lyricist
- Vera Sola, stage name of singer and songwriter Danielle Aykroyd
- Šola, a surname found in Croatia and Bosnia and Herzegovina (includes a list of people with the name)

=== Given name ===
- Sola, a variant of Shola (name)
- Sola, an alternate spelling of Sora (Japanese given name)
- Liu Sola (born 1955), Chinese composer, author and vocalist
- Sola Sierra (1935–1999), Chilean human rights activist

== Places ==
- Sola Municipality, a municipality in Rogaland county, Norway
  - Sola (village), a village within Sola Municipality in Rogaland county, Norway
  - Sola Air Station, a base for the Royal Norwegian Air Force
  - Stavanger Airport, Sola, an international airport in Rogaland county, Norway (locally known as Sola)
- Sola, Togo, a village in Kara Region, Togo
- Sola, Vanuatu, the capital city of Torba Province, Vanuatu
- Sola (province), Occitan name for Soule in southwest France
- Sola (restaurant), in London
- Sola (Sierra de Cubitas), a town in Camagüey Province, Cuba
- Soła, a river in Poland
- SoLA, an abbreviation for South Los Angeles

== Other uses ==
- Five Solas, five Latin phrases summarizing the core beliefs of the Protestant Reformation
- SOLA, School of Leadership Afghanistan
- Sola submachine gun, built by Societe Luxembourgeoise SA in Luxembourg between 1954 and 1957.
- Xperia sola, a cell phone by Sony
- Aeschynomene aspera, a flowering plant from Asia with pithy stems
- Sola Digital Arts, a Japanese animation studio

== See also ==
- Sole (disambiguation)
- Sora (disambiguation)
- Solas (disambiguation)
