= Tromsø Airport, Skattøra =

- IATA: none; ICAO: none

Summary
- Airport type: Joint (military and civil)
- Operator: Royal Norwegian Navy Air Service; Tromsø Municipality
- Serves: Tromsø, Norway
- Location: Skattøra, Tromsø
- Elevation AMSL: 0 m / 0 ft
- Coordinates: 69.6958°N 019.0189°E

Map

Runways
Direction	Length		Surface
Direction	m	ft	Surface
			Water

Tromsø Airport, Skattøra (Norwegian: Tromsø sjøflyhavn, Skattøra), also known by its military designation Skattøra Naval Air Station (Norwegian: Skattøra sjøflystasjon, German: Seefliegerhorst Tromsö) was a water aerodrome and air base situated at Skattøra in the city of Tromsø in Tromsø Municipality in Troms county, Norway. Construction began in 1938 and the aerodrome was in use until 1975. At its peak it was the largest water airport in Northern Europe.

The first water airport in Tromsø was located at the port in the city center and opened in 1935 to serve Norwegian Air Lines (DNL) flights. Skattøra was first built by the Royal Norwegian Navy Air Service, with construction starting in 1938. With the break-out of the Second World War in Norway on 9 April 1940, Skattøra was the home to Heinkel He 115 and Marinens Flyvebaatfabrikk M.F.11, which participated in the Norwegian Campaign. From June the air station was taken over by the Luftwaffe, which expanded the facilities and made it the center for its seaplane fleet in the North Atlantic.

The Royal Norwegian Air Force (RNoAF) took over Skattøra in 1945 and from 1947 it was designated a main air station. Until the military left in 1959, it hosted the 21 Transport Flight of Noorduyn Norseman transporters and the 333 Squadron with Consolidated PBY Catalina reconnaissance aircraft. It also hosted the area control center for Northern Norway until 1957. Civilian traffic commenced in 1946, first by DNL and later its successor Scandinavian Airlines System. Widerøe took over the scheduled flights in 1954, but withdrew in 1964 with the opening of Tromsø Airport, Langnes. Later operators at the airport included Helikopter Service from 1948 and Nor-Wing, and its successor Norving, from 1965. The control tower was closed in 1967 and the aerodrome abandoned in 1975.

== History ==
=== Preamble ===
The first proposals for an airport in Tromsø was presented in 1918 by Det Norske Luftfartsrederi, who intended to operate air route to Northern Norway. They conducted surveys in 1919, but filed for bankruptcy the following year without their plans being carried through. A 1922 report from Blehr's Second Cabinet proposed water aerodromes as far north as Harstad, but not Tromsø. Five years later the city was included in the plans for future airline routes. The plans went unsubstantiated until the mid-1930s.

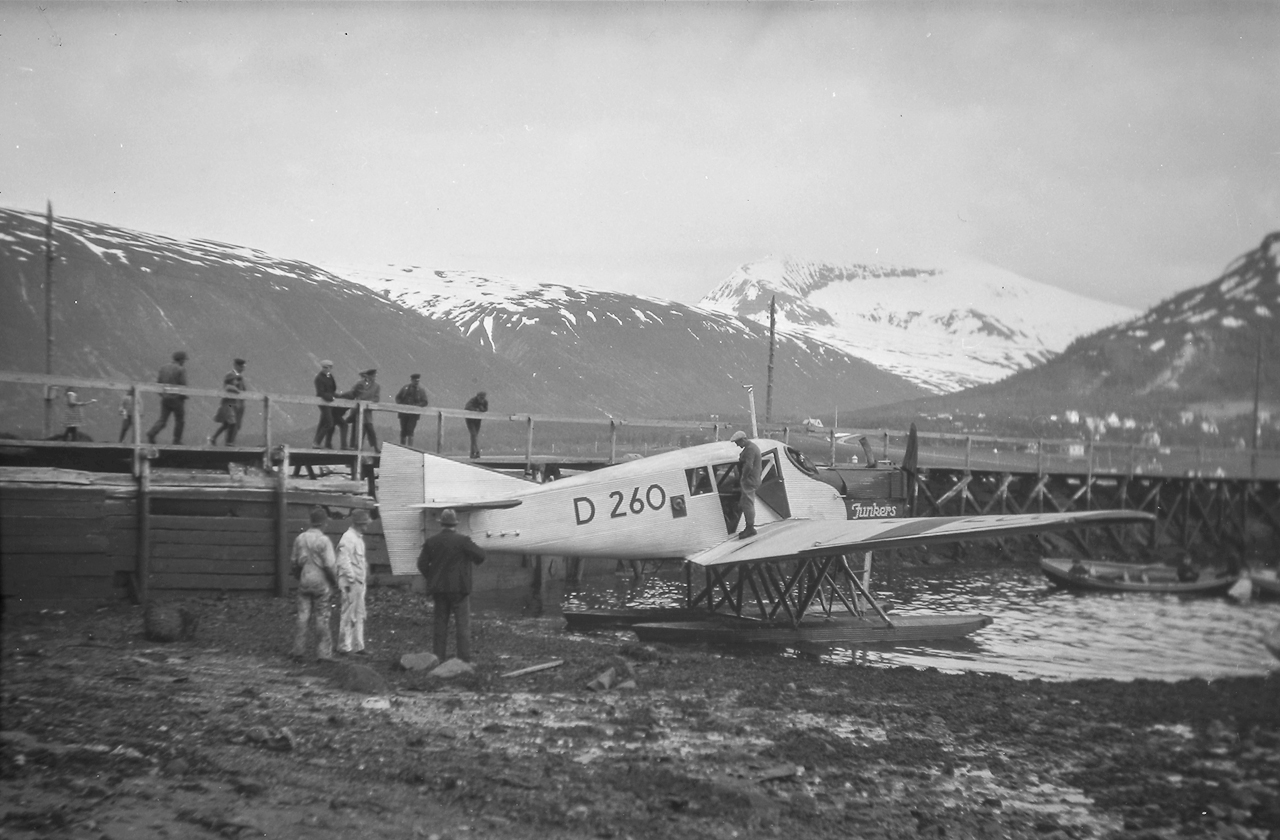
Junkers aircraft visiting Tromsø in 1923, docked at the port in the city center

When domestic air routes were established in 1935, there only went months from the approval to the services commenced. Permission was granted in April, at which time a suitable site for an aerodrome had yet to be identified. As an interim solution a buoy was founded for the first season. Norwegian Air Lines set up Tromsø as the last stop on its coastal service north of Bergen. Using a Junkers W 34, the route was inaugurated on 7 July and ran three times weekly for four weeks in the first season. Travel time to Bergen was ten and a half hours.

From the 1936 season a permanent location for the airport was needed. A key factor was the need to place it as close to the city center as possible. Tromsøysundet was selected as the runway and the docks and terminal were located at Dampskipkaien. DNL specified their needs and Tromsø Municipality built the airport after the specifications. The most costly part was a floating docks, which was built using twelve used oil drums. A barracks in the inner parts of the port was used as a terminal building.

=== Naval establishment ===
Parliament approved construction of a naval air station in Northern Norway in 1933. The following year the Ministry of Defense asked that two Marinens Flyvebaatfabrikk M.F.11 be station to the north. Ramsund Naval Base was initially proposed as a suitable location, as it would allow it to be co-located with the rest of the operations of the Royal Norwegian Navy. Also Salangen Municipality and Harstad Municipality were considered. However, the need for a base closer to Finnmark county caused them to be discarded.

The search was intensified with a committee appointed in 1936. They looked at four sites in Troms: Gibostad, Eidkjosen, Hessfjord, and Breivika. The latter included sites both at and south of Skattøra. It was chosen due to its proximity to Finnmark, proximity to the Navy's offices in Tromsø and good landing conditions under a variety of wind conditions. The plans included two hangars the size of the ultimate building, two barracks, a terminal two slipways, docks and ammunition storage. The goal was to make the airport the main air station for seaplanes in Northern Norway. Funding of 100,000 Norwegian krone was granted in 1936 and the project was scheduled for completion in 1941.

The Navy signed a lease for 2.6 hectares (6.4 acres) of land for five years. This was because the station was presumed to be provisional. However, as the fear of war rose, the state chose to expropriate the property on 25 July 1938. Construction commenced in January 1939, consisting of a slipway, a guard station, a barracks and a fuel depot. Further work was started to allow six torpedo bombers and twelve reconnaissance aircraft be stationed at Skattøra.

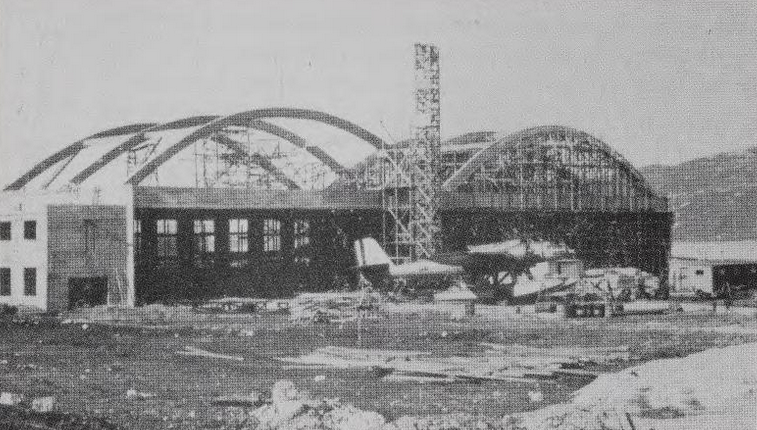
Heinkel He 115 of the Royal Norwegian Navy Air Service at the airport on 28 May 1940, during the Norwegian Campaign

With the full mobilization in September 1939, the Navy Air Service organized its 3rd Air Wing at Skattøra, with detachments at Hammerfest and Vadsø. The air wing was activated on 27 September, consisting of a single M.F.11. At the time the aerodrome only had a few buoys to anchor to. In October three Heinkel He 115 torpedo bombers were dispatched and were used to patrol the coast from Kirkenes to Helgeland.

With Operation Weserübung—the German invasion of Norway on 9 April 1940—the aircraft at Skattøra did not conduct any activities until 13 April, when they partook in reconnaissance in Ofotfjorden. They were thereafter spread to locations from Central Hålogaland to Finnmark, with as few aircraft as possible at Skattøra at any given time. Through May the 3rd Air Wing received reinforcements from the south and was by then operating six He 115s and six M.F.11s. This included two captures He 115s. Nygaardsvold's Cabinet took office in Tromsø and from 13 May the airport was used for flights to and from Sweden and Shetland. In addition to the 3rd Air Wing, these flights were carried out by the French Air Force and the Royal Air Force, the latter who for a period had a Short Sunderland stationed there. The aircraft and crew flew 174 missions, including reconnaissance, transport and bombing of German targets in Ofoten.

=== Luftwaffe operation ===
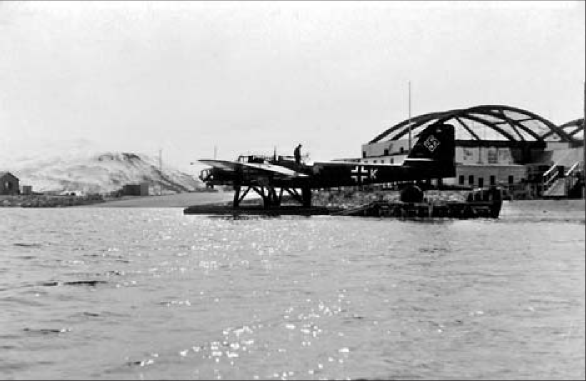
A Heinkel He 115C of Luftwaffe at Skattøra in 1940

Following the surrender in Northern Norway on 10 July 1940, the Luftwaffe took control over Skattøra. Two days later the airport was cleared for use by German aircraft. Skattøra was first used by 1. Küstenfliegergruppen/506, but their He 115s were soon bombed or destroyed in a fire. Skattøra was taken over by 2. Küstenfliegergruppen/506., which also operated He 115s. From September these aircraft were used to send freight and supplies to Jan Mayen and Svalbard. Until October an air ambulance operated out of Skattøra.

German water airport efforts in Northern Norway originally centered around their own plans for Billefjord Airport and Sørreisa Airport. However, with the onset of the fall storms, the Luftwaffe realized the favorable location of Skattøra. From 1941 they therefore resumed the Norwegian plans for completing the air station. Work progressed with limited supplies and those needed for the Polar Line were cannibalized to give way for the airport's completion. From 5 July the workforce was supplemented and later dominated by Eastern European prisoners of war (POW), mostly from Yugoslavia and the Soviet Union. As of 1 January 1943 there were 441 POWs in Tromsø, most of which were working at Skattøra. By 1 April 1945 the number had increased to 1,325, of which 661 were working at Skattøra. Eighteen POWs died in Tromsø during the war.

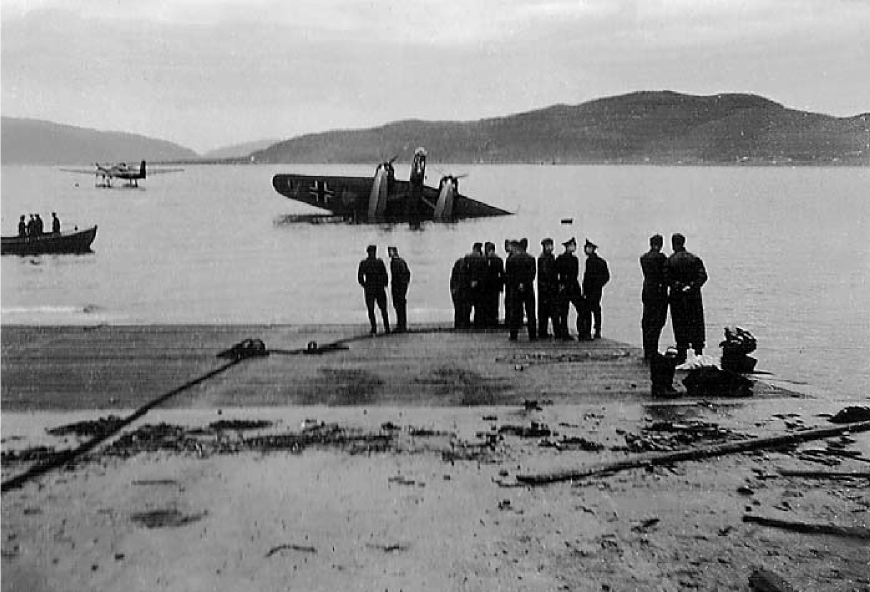
Aftermath of the bombing of the airport on 26 August 1940

About ninety percent of Luftwaffe's seaplane fleet was allocated to Norway, and of that between eighty and ninety percent was allocated to Seefliegerhorst Tromsö. Although the center of operations, The Seefliegerhorst commanded water air stations along the coast from Ålesund Airport, Sørneset to Kirkenes. Aircraft based at Skattøra included He 115 torpedo bombers; Arado Ar 196, Arado Ar 199, He 59 and Blohm & Voss BV 222 communication aircraft; BV 138, Dornier Do 18 and Do 24 and reconnaissance aircraft, Do 24 search and rescue aircraft and Fieseler Fi 156. There were also patrol boats, two catapult ships and various auxiliary ships stationed at Skattøra.

About 1,500 people were working at Skattøra. There were not sufficient quarters for these at the air station, so they were lodged throughout Tromsø. An important task was patrol of the Arctic convoys, in which the reconnaissance aircraft would search for and then report the position of the convoys to naval ships and U-boats. Deutsche Luft Hansa operated an airline route from Kirkenes via Tromsø to Hamburg. It was flown three times a week during the summer and at least once a week during the winter. Initially operating with a Ju 52, it was later upgraded to the BV 222.

There were two Allied bombings of Skattøra. The first was on 26 August 1940, conducted by a British Supermarine Walrus. The second took place on 12 April 1942, when the aerodrome was hit by bombs from a Soviet Ilyushin DB-3. Damage was limited to a few blasted oil drums and a few injured soldiers.

=== Royal Norwegian Air Force operations ===
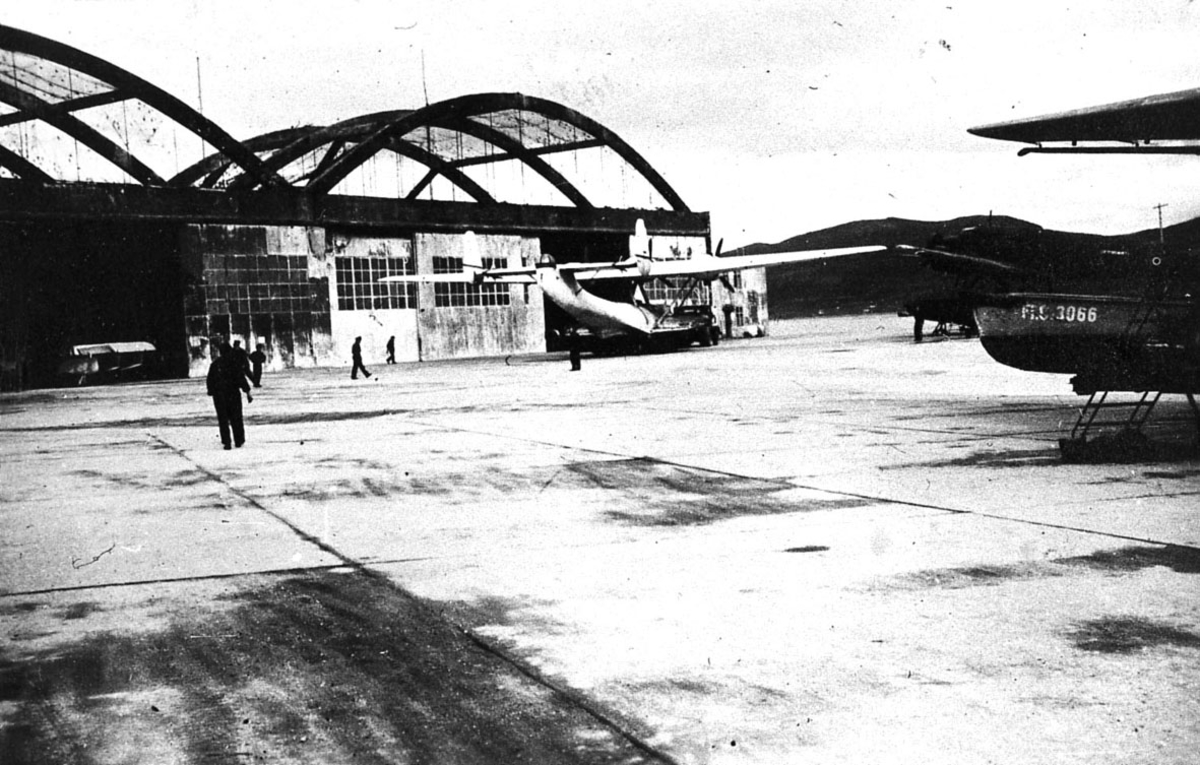
Dornier Do 24 at Skattøra in 1945–46

The RNoAF returned to Skattøra in May 1945, after the end of the war. The No. 8601 Demolition Squadron RAF was flown to Tromsø to demolish the majority of the Luftwaffe's aircraft. Two Do 24 were taken over by the RNoAF. They were crewed with German pilots and were used to transport German soldiers to conduct minesweeping, as well as to act as ambulances. They were moved to Fornebu Air Station in October, but returned for the 1946 season.

No. 21 Communication Flight was set up at Skattøra almost immediately after the surrender. They flew Noorduyn Norseman transporters. This task was taken over by the Small Transport Wing in 1946. They would retain between two and four Norsemen at the airport until its closing for military operations. Skattøra was also the base for three Junkers Ju 52 transports of the 335 Squadron from 22 June to November 1945.

The 333 Squadron was from 1 January 1946 equipped with Consolidated PBY Catalinas. A detachment of these were station at Skattøra. Their main task was transporting freight, passengers and goods to Svalbard, including the communities of Longyearbyen, Isfjord Radio, Ny-Ålesund, Hopen and Bjørnøya. The squadron also performed search and rescue and air ambulance missions.

Two-thirds of the building complex at the station was demolished in the remainder of 1945. This was done to secure building material for the reconstruction of Finnmark. For instance Gunnarnes Chapel is a former barracks built at Skattøra. Skattøra was the only naval air station of the Navy Air Service to resume use after the war. All other seaplane bases were jointly located with land airport. The Air Force decided in 1947 to make Skattøra one of its five main air stations—and the only one of these to be a water airport. The Air Force and the civilian aviation authorities determined that Norway would receive two area control centers for its air traffic control. One of these was located at Tromsø and located in the subterranean structure at Marielund. This also acted as a rescue coordination center. The fire station was converted to a joint control tower and weather station.

With the advent of the Korean War, the 333 Squadron was moved from Sola Air Station to Skattøra in 1950. Their new main mission was surveillance of the northern sea area of the Norwegian Sea and the Barents Sea. The squadron moved back to Sola in May 1952, although a detachment remained in Tromsø. From 1953 to 1 November 1955 the squadron also operated Noorduyn Norseman transporters. Flights to Svalbard and Jan Mayen were then flown out of Bodø Main Air Station, although they did not have sufficient range for these missions and had to land at Tromsø for refueling. The Catalinas therefore continued to operate out of Skattøra until 1959.

The Royal Norwegian Navy had a small guard unit at Skattøra from 1945 to 1949. From 1954 the 21 Communication Flight was equipped with de Havilland Canada DHC-3 Otters, to supplements its Norsemen. They originally had pontoons, later they received amphibious pontoons. The air artillery set up a unit at Skattøra in 1955, with the task of providing air defense for Tromsø. They remained until 1960.

With Norway's entry into the North Atlantic Treaty Organization a large amount of funding was allocated to building new land airports. This and the technological development meant that seaplanes would no longer be a central part of the Air Force. Skattøra was during the 1950s the only NATO water air station. However, it would take over a decade before the other infrastructure and aircraft had reached such a standard that the air station could be closed. With the replacement of the Catalinas with Grumman HU-16 Albatross, the northern detachment of the 333 Squadron relocated to Andøya Air Station. The military activity at Skattøra was therefore terminated in March 1959. However, Albatrosses would continue to use the civilian airport throughout the 1960s.

The Navy returned to Skattøra in 1962 and used the hangar as a depot. It also had a surveillance vessel, Havørn, which was disguised as a fishing vessel. During the preamble for establishing the Coast Guard during the 1960s, Skattøra was considered as a possible main base for the flotilla. The Navy pulled out of Skattøra in 1969.

=== Commercial operations ===
When commercial flights resumed on 27 May 1946, Skattøra was allocated to also serve as the civilian airport for Tromsø. DNL resumed its coastal route, still flown with Junkers Ju 52 aircraft. The following year the 37-passenger Short Sandringham flying boats were introduced on the haul, which remained in use until 1952. SAS's flights continued until 1954, from 1951 as part of the Scandinavian Airlines System consortium.

Polarfly was established in 1948 and stationed two Norsemen at Skattøra to act as air ambulance and air taxi. The following year Polarfly merged with Widerøe. Skattøra soon became the airline's main technical base in Northern Norway. Due to security concerns, a separate passenger terminal was built at the aerodrome in 1952, outside the gate of the air station.

Bodø Airport opened as the first civilian land airport in Northern Norway in 1952. It was followed by Bardufoss Airport in 1956. The latter served only a small community, but its military counterpart, Bardufoss Air Station, was expanded to meet NATO demands. SAS started direct flights from Bardufoss to Oslo, using it to serve all of Troms. Subsequently, it also shut down its operations out of Skattøra. Tromsø Air Traffic Control Center remained until 1 January 1957, when it was relocated to Bodø.

Widerøe was given the task of flying the seaplane routes to Finnmark on SAS's concession from 1954. For this Widerøe bought new Otters. Two years later the airline took over maintenance of the military aircraft at Skattøra. The services out of Tromsø continue until 1962, when the government abolished the subsidies for the routes. The following year three land airports opened in Finnmark. Widerøe remained at Skattøra until 14 September 1964, when Tromsø Airport, Langnes opened. Langnes received its own water aerodrome and Widerøe moved its operations there, abandoning Skattøra.

Scancopterservice, later Helikopter Service, established itself at Skattøra in 1958. Its Bell 47 was the first helicopter based in Troms. Most of its early contracts were tied to construction of hydroelectric power stations. Nor-Wings was established in 1965 and made Skattøra its base for general aviation jobs. At first it operated a Norseman and later a Hønningstad C.5 Polar. The control tower at Skattøra was closed on 1 January 1967. Nor-Wing merged with Varangfly in 1971 to create Norving. Other airlines which for shorter or longer periods had an aircraft stationed at Skattøra were Bjørumfly, Mørefly, Norfly, Norrønafly and Ski og Sjøfly. Helikopter pulled out of Skattøra in 1972 and Norving abandoned the airport three years later.

=== Later use ===
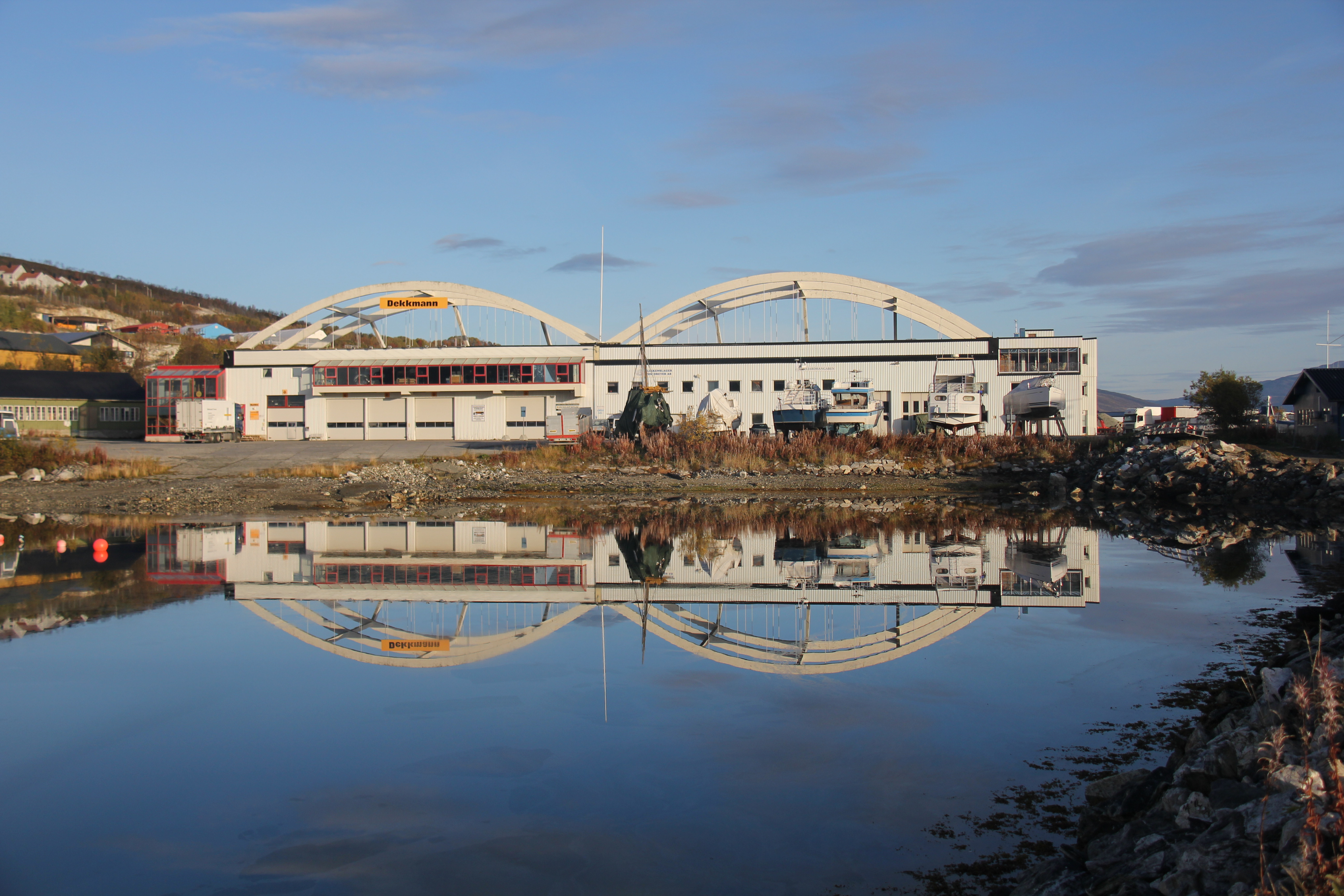
Contemporary view of the airport

Civilian use of the company began in the 1950s. The ward was in 1955 converted to a psychiatric clinic. The civilian cafeteria was taken over by Northern Troms Vocational School in 1957 and used as a dormitory. The mess hall was converted to a gym in 1960 and its basement as a shooting range used by the Home Guard.

Starting in the 1970s the Skattøra area became a popular growth area and the seaside properties in the area experienced a development into industrial sites. Røstad Båt og Motorco moved into the hangar in 1980. The supplier of boats and boat equipment started the process of converting the docks into a marina. Later it used the hangars for boat construction. The hangar was rebuilt during the 1990s and given two stories, such that most of the interior does not represent its original form. However, the exterior is largely intact. Tromsø Municipality retains ownership of most of the properties at the site.

Local historical enthusiasts proposed in 2003 that the remains of the airport be listed as a cultural heritage. This was followed up by Troms County Municipality in December 2009, when they started the listing process. The rationale is that Skattøra represents the best preserved water airport in Northern Europe and the best preserved military installation in Troms from modern times.

== Facilities ==
The airport was situated at Skattøra in what was then Tromsøysund Municipality, in today's Tromsø, some 6 kilometers (3.7 mi) north of the city center. The predominant structure at the airport was the twin hangar building. It consists of two concrete arch triplets which carry the roof. Inside the hangar is split in two with a reinforced wall. The structure measures 2,000 square meters (22,000 sq ft). There were two slipways, one falling down from the hangar and one further north. There was a 63-meter (207 ft) pier which ran out from the airport, with a small building at the end. A reinforced wall was built to protect aircraft from attack.

From 1937 to 1945 there was an aeradio at the airport. It was then merged and taken over by and co-located with Tromsø Radio. The airport had a control tower situated in the former fire station. From 1947 to 1957 Tromsø Air Traffic Control Center was situated in a subterranean facility at Marielund. Its area of operation covered from Trøndelag and north in Norway, as well as the Atlantic Ocean out to Svalbard, Jan Mayen and Iceland.

Luftwaffe installed a subterranean fuel depot. It was taken over by Norsk Brændselolje, which was again taken over by BP. At its peak eight people were employed with the fuel service. Shell was responsible for aviation fuel from 1945 to 1972. The base had from 1947 a post office and from 1949 a general store. Both were closed in 1969.

== Bibliography ==
- Arheim, Tom; Hafsten, Bjørn; Olsen, Bjørn; Thuve, Sverre (1994). Fra Spitfire til F-16: Luftforsvaret 50 år 1944–1994 (in Norwegian). Oslo: Sem & Stenersen. ISBN 82-7046-068-0.
- Eilertsen, Roar (1984). Næringslivet i Tromsø (in Norwegian). Tromsø: Tromsø Sparebank.
- Hafsten, Bjørn; Larsstuvold, Ulf; Olsen, Bjørn; Stenersen, Sten (1991). Flyalarm: Luftkrigen over Norge 1939–1945 (in Norwegian). Oslo: Sem & Stenersen. p. 225. ISBN 82-7046-058-3.
- Hafsten, Bjørn; Arheim, Tom (2003). Marinens flygevåpen 1912–1944 (in Norwegian). TankeStreken. ISBN 82-993535-1-3.
- Jensen, Einar-Roald (2001). Skattøra sjøflystasjon: 1937–75 – Historisk overblikk (PDF) (in Norwegian). Archived (PDF) from the original on 20 January 2015.
- Melling, Kjersti (2009). Nordavind fra alle kanter (in Norwegian). Oslo: Pilotforlaget.
- Olsen-Hagen, Bernt; Gulstad, Anne Blix; Gynnild, Olav (2012). Tromsø lufthavn, Langnes – Dokumentasjon for arkivmessig bevaring (PDF) (in Norwegian). Norwegian Aviation Museum. Archived (PDF) from the original on 19 January 2015.
- Troms County Municipality (2014). Fredning av Skattøra – Offentlig ettersyn (PDF) (in Norwegian). Archived (PDF) from the original on 20 January 2015.
