= Sora (Korean given name) =

- Hangul: 소라
- RR: Sora
- MR: Sora

Sora is a Korean given name. The word itself is a native Korean word meaning "conch shell" and does not have corresponding hanja. However, since Korean given names can be created arbitrarily, it may also be a name with hanja (e.g. 素羅).

The homophony with the Japanese name Sora is coincidental.

== List ==
Notable people with this name include:

- Bak So-ra (fl. 1990s), South Korean voice actress
- Choi Sora (born 1992), South Korean fashion model
- Jung So-ra (born 1991), South Korean beauty pageant winner
- Kang So-ra (born 1990), South Korean film actress
- Lee So-ra (disambiguation), multiple people:
  - Lee So-ra (model) (born 1969), South Korean model
  - Lee So-ra (singer) (born 1969), South Korean singer
  - Lee So-ra (tennis) (born 1994), South Korean tennis player
  - Lee So-ra (volleyball) (born 1987), South Korean volleyball player

== See also ==
- List of Korean given names
- Sora Jung (born 1968), South Korean television actress
