= Sora =

Sora or SORA may refer to:

== People ==
- Sora (Japanese given name), a unisex Japanese given name
- Sora (Korean given name), a Korean given name
- Lembu Sora (fl. c. 1300), Indonesian warlord
- Ciprian Sora, Romanian former kickboxer
- Mihai Șora, Romanian philosopher
- Sora people, an Indian ethnic group
  - Sora language

== Places ==
- Sora, Chile
- Sora, Boyacá, Central Boyacá Province, Colombia
- Sora (Klipphausen), Meißen, Saxony, Germany
- Sora (Wilthen), Bautzen, Saxony, Germany
- Sora, Lazio, Italy
- Sorá, Chame District, Panama
- Sora, Medvode, Slovenia
- Sora (river), in Upper Carniola, Slovenia
- Sora-myeon, Yeosu, South Jeolla, South Korea
- Sora, Barcelona, Catalonia, Spain
- Sora (Anatolia), Turkey

== Entertainment ==
- Sora (album), a 2007 album by Japanese singer Yui Aragaki, or the title track
- "Sora" (song), by Soulhead, 2003
- Sora (Kingdom Hearts), the protagonist in the Kingdom Hearts series
- Sora (Ninjago), a character in Ninjago
- Sora Ltd., a Japanese video game developer
- Sora Harewataru, a main character in Soaring Sky! Pretty Cure
- Project Sora, a subsidiary of Japanese video game developer Nintendo
- Soap opera rapid aging syndrome, a plot device in television dramas

== Biology ==
- Sora (bird), a small waterbird of the family Rallidae
- Selective orexin receptor antagonist, a substance that inhibits the activity of one or the other of the OX_{1} and OX_{2} receptors
- Sora (beetle), a darkling beetle genus in the subfamily Lagriinae
- SORA (Searchable Ornithological Research Archive), a pioneering open-access ornithological journal archive launched in 2004

== Technology ==
- Sora-Q, tiny Lunar rover developed in Japan
- Sora (text-to-video model), developed by OpenAI

== Transportation ==
- Southern Rails Cooperative, with reporting mark "SORA"
- ACS-100 Sora, a Brazilian light sports aircraft
- Shimano Sora, an entry-level road bicycle component groupset by Shimano

== Other uses ==
- Sapporo Convention Center, also known as SORA
- A.S.D. G.C. Sora, an Italian association football club

== See also ==
- Sola (disambiguation)
