= 2001–02 Serie C1 =

Italian football league season

The 2001–02 Serie C1 was the 24th season of Serie C1, the third tier of Italian football, which is now known as Serie C.

== Group A (North) ==
	A	Pt	G	V	N	P	GF	GS
1.	Calcio Livorno (P)	73	34	20	13	1	62	21
2.	Spezia	70	34	19	13	2	53	20
3.	Lucchese	56	34	16	8	10	40	29
4.	Treviso	56	34	15	11	8	36	24
5.	Triestina (OP)	53	34	13	14	7	41	33
6.	Calcio Varese	50	34	12	14	8	38	38
7.	Calcio Lumezzane	49	34	13	10	12	45	40
8.	Cesena	45	34	11	12	11	34	39
9.	Padova	44	34	11	11	12	43	43
10.	Calcio Lecco (ERR)	42	34	10	12	12	46	40
11.	Pisa	42	34	13	3	18	39	45
12.	SPAL	41	34	9	14	11	44	46
13.	Albinoleffe	41	34	8	17	9	33	35
14.	Reggiana	37	34	10	7	17	36	55
15.	Carrarese (T)	37	34	9	10	15	33	50
16.	Arezzo	30	34	8	6	20	37	58
17.	Alzano Virescit (T)	30	34	7	9	18	27	51
18.	Calcio Monza (R)	24	34	4	12	18	27	47

=== Play-off ===
Semifinal

	Result		Date
Triestina	2 - 0	Spezia	Trieste, 19 May 2002
Spezia	1 - 0	Triestina	La Spezia, 26 May 2002
Treviso	0 - 1	Lucchese	Treviso, 19 May 2002
Lucchese	2 - 1	Treviso	Lucca, 26 June 2002

Final

	Result		Date
Triestina	2 - 0	Lucchese	Trieste, 2 June 2002
Lucchese	3 - 3 d.t.s.	Triestina	Lucca, 9 June 2002

=== Play-out ===
	Result		Date
Alzano Virescit	2 - 1	Reggiana	Alzano Lombardo, 19 May 2002
Reggiana	2 - 1	Alzano Virescit	Reggio Emilia, 26 May 2002
Arezzo	1 - 2	Carrarese	Arezzo, 19 May 2002
Carrarese	0 - 3	Arezzo	Carrara, 26 May 2002

== Group B (South) ==
	B	Pt	G	V	N	P	GF	GS
1.	Ascoli	67	34	18	13	3	55	26
2.	Taranto	62	34	17	11	6	50	30
3.	Catania	58	34	17	7	10	44	26
4.	Pescara	53	34	13	14	7	48	29
5.	Lanciano	51	34	14	9	11	36	30
6.	Giulianova	51	34	13	12	9	44	31
7.	Avellino	48	34	11	15	8	39	41
8.	Chieti	47	34	11	14	9	28	27
9.	Fermana	46	34	12	10	12	32	33
10.	Viterbese	44	34	10	14	10	33	35
11.	Sassari Torres	43	34	11	10	13	41	35
12.	Vis Pesaro	43	34	9	16	9	32	32
13.	L'Aquila	43	34	11	10	13	31	45
14.	Castel di Sangro	39	34	10	9	15	27	37
15.	Benevento	39	34	10	9	15	27	38
16.	Nocerina	30	34	7	9	18	32	59
17.	Sora	29	34	6	11	17	21	39
18.	Lodigiani	23	34	4	11	19	24	51

=== Play-off ===
Semifinal

	Result		Date
Lanciano	3 - 2	Taranto	Lanciano, 19 May 2002
Taranto	2 - 1	Lanciano	Taranto, 26 May 2002
Pescara	1 - 0	Catania	Pescara, 19 May 2002
Catania	1 - 0	Pescara	Catania, 26 May 2002

Final

	Result		Date
Catania	1 - 0	Taranto	Catania, 2 June 2002
Taranto	0 - 0	Catania	Taranto, 9 June 2002

=== Play-out ===
	Result		Date
Sora	1 - 0	Castel di Sangro	Sora, 19 May 2002
Castel di Sangro	0 - 0	Sora	Castel di Sangro, 26 May 2002
Nocerina	0 - 1	Benevento	Nocera Inferiore, 19 May 2002
Benevento	0 - 1	Nocerina	Benevento, 26 May 2002

== Supercup ==
Ascoli 1–0 Livorno, Stadio Del Duca, Ascoli Piceno

Livorno 2–1 Ascoli, Stadio Armando Picchi, Livorno

Ascoli (group B) won on away goals rule, aggregate 2–2

== References and sources ==
- Almanacco Illustrato del Calcio - La Storia 1898-2004, Panini Edizioni, Modena, September 2005

Specific
