= Šola =

Šola (pronounced [ʃôla]) is a surname found in Croatia and Bosnia and Herzegovina.

Notable people with the name include:

- Antonija Šola (born 1979), Croatian musician and actress
- Ivan Šola (born 1961), Croatian bobsledder and racer
- Ivica Šola (born 1968), Croatian theologian and communication scientist
- John Sola (born 1944), Canadian politician of Croatian origin
- Tomislav Šola (born 1948), Croatian museologist
- Vlado Šola (born 1968), Croatian handball coach and player
- Vojislav Šola (1863–1921), Bosnian Serb activist and politician
