= Solas =

Solas may refer to:

== Arts and entertainment ==
- Solas (group), an Irish-American musical group
- Solas (album), by The Answer
- Solas Festival, a Scottish music festival
- Solas (film), a 1999 Spanish film directed by Benito Zambrano
- "Solas" (song), by Jamie Duffy

== People ==
- Solås, a Norwegian surname
- Daniel Solas (born 1946), French former footballer
- Humberto Solás (1941–2008), Cuban director
- María Ruiz Solás (born 1970), Spanish journalist, businesswoman, politician

=== Fictional characters ===
- Solas (Dragon Age), the name of an Elven Mage from Dragon Age: Inquisition

== Science and technology ==
- Surface Ocean Lower Atmosphere Study, a research project
- Service-Oriented Localisation Architecture Solution, software
- SOLAS (cable system), in the List of international submarine communications cables

== Other uses ==
- SOLAS Convention (Safety of Life at Sea), an international convention
- Sollas (Scottish Gaelic: Solas), a village, Outer Hebrides, Scotland, UK
- SOLAS (Ireland), an Irish state agency, successor to Foras Áiseanna Saothair

== See also ==
- Five solas (five solae), Latin phrases summarizing the core beliefs behind the Protestant Reformation
- A solas (disambiguation)
- Sola (disambiguation)
