= Solås =

Solås is a Norwegian surname. Notable people with the surname include:

- Eyvind Solås (1937–2011), Norwegian musician, composer, actor and program host in NRK
- Håvard Solås Taugbøl (born 1993), Norwegian cross-country skier
- Kjerstin Boge Solås (born 1997), Norwegian handball player
- Monica Kristensen Solås (born 1950), Norwegian glaciologist, meteorologist, polar explorer and crime novelist

== See also ==
- Solas (disambiguation)
