= Woodhaven, Fife =

British locality

Coordinates: 56.433°N 2.953°W

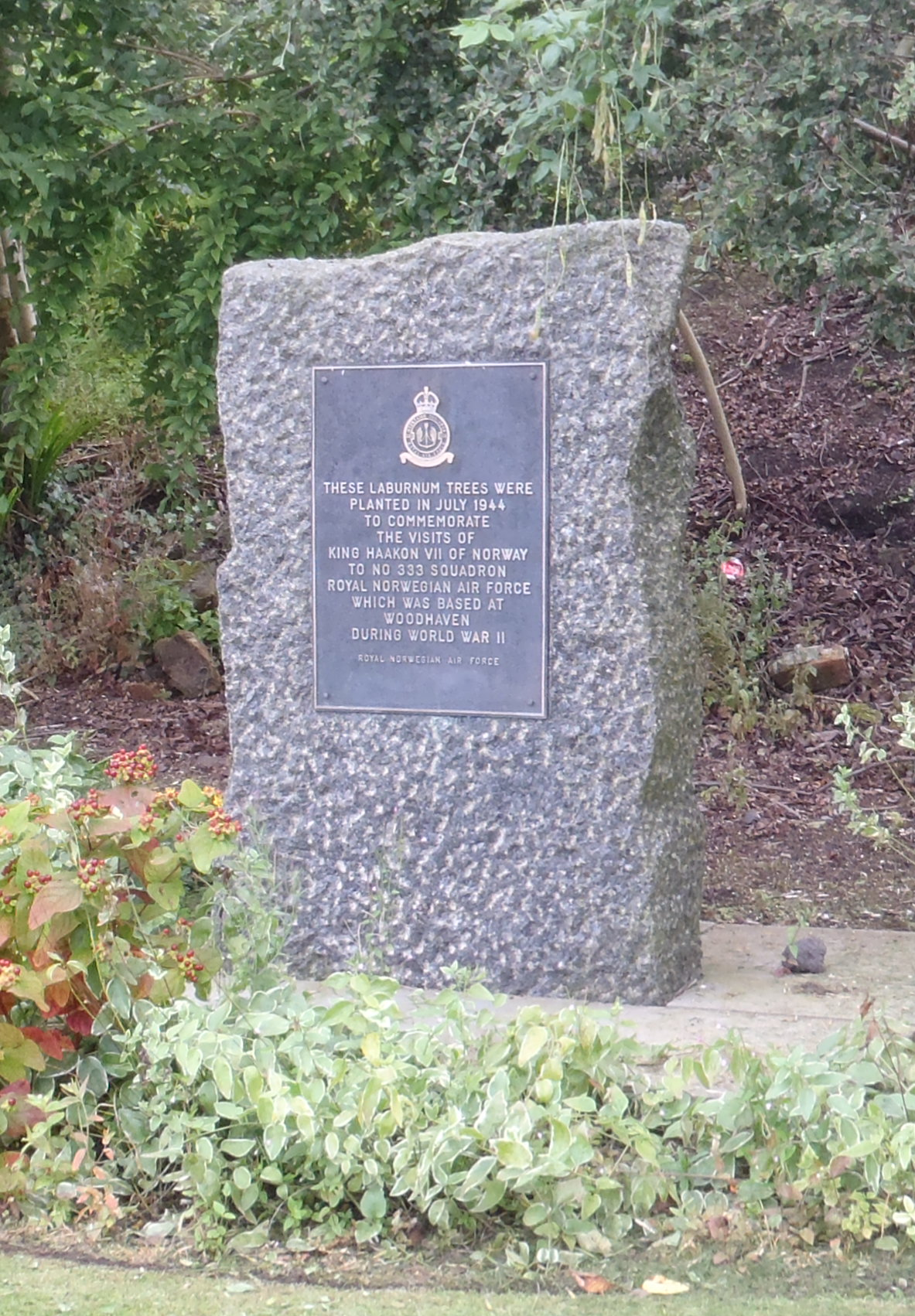
Royal Norwegian Air Force Commemorative Stone in Woodhaven.

Woodhaven used to be a small village between Newport-on-Tay and Wormit in Fife, Scotland. Due to expansion of these two villages over the years, it is now just the name for a harbour and pier (Grid Reference NO407270). During World War II there was a flying boat station at Woodhaven operating four PBY5 Catalina aircraft manned by Flight A of No. 333 (Norwegian) Squadron, Royal Air Force. The Norwegian personnel were based at RAF Leuchars along with their colleagues in Flight B who flew land based Mosquito aircraft.

From 1869 to 1929 HMS Mars was moored off Woodhaven, serving as a training ship.

A commemorative stone at the Woodhaven harbour reads:

These laburnum trees were planted in July 1944 to commemorate the visits of King Haakon VII of Norway to No 333 Squadron Royal Norwegian Air Force which was based at Woodhaven during World War II. Royal Norwegian Air Force

Next to the pier there has been The Old Boathouse bed & breakfast.

== Sources ==
- http://www.british-history.ac.uk/report.asp?compid=16176
