= Lee So-ra =

Lee So-ra (이소라) is the name of:

- Lee So-ra (model) (born 1969), South Korean model
- Lee So-ra (singer) (born 1969), South Korean singer
- Lee So-ra (volleyball) (born 1987), South Korean volleyball player
- Lee So-ra (tennis) (born 1994), South Korean tennis player
