= No. 333 Squadron RNoAF =

333 Squadron Royal Norwegian Air Force No. 333 (Norwegian) Squadron Royal Air Force
- Active: 5 May 1943 – 21 November 1945; 21 November 1945 -
- Country: Norway; United Kingdom (1943-45)
- Allegiance: (Norway) Norwegian Government in exile (1943-45)
- Branch: Royal Norwegian Air Force; Royal Air Force (1943-45)
- Base: Andøya Air Station
- Mottos: Norwegian: For Konge, Fedreland og flaggets heder ("For King, fatherland, and the honour of the flag")

Insignia
- Squadron Badge heraldry: In front of a pair of wings elevated and conjoined in base a Viking ship affrontée
- Squadron Codes: KK (Sep 1944 – Nov 1945)

333 Squadron of the Royal Norwegian Air Force is a maritime patrol aircraft squadron. It traces its history, unbroken, to the establishment of No. 333 (Norwegian) Squadron Royal Air Force of the Second World War, formed in May 1943.

== History ==
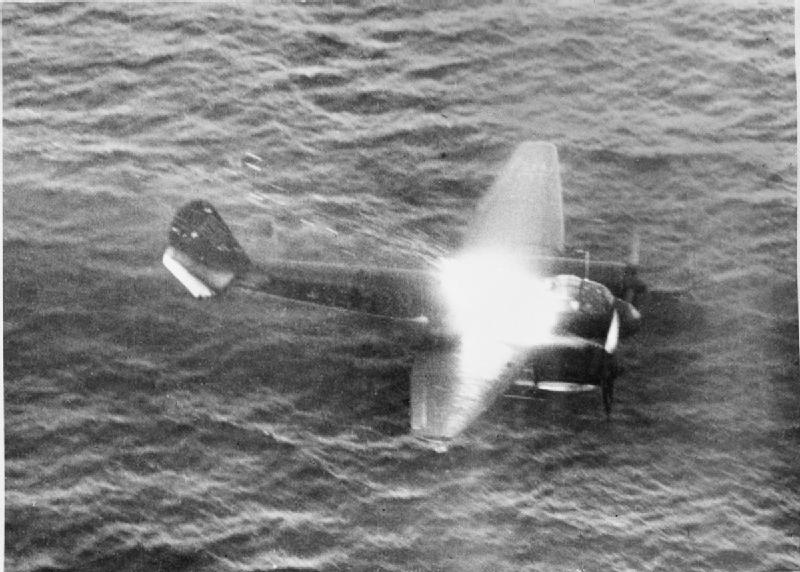
A Ju 88 with one engine on fire, about to ditch after being damaged by cannon fire from a 333 Squadron Mosquito.

The Squadron was established as a detachment (No. 1477 (Norwegian) Flight) under the 210 Squadron of the British Royal Air Force, on 8 February 1942, by Captain Finn Lambrechts. The squadron was located in Woodhaven, Fife, Scotland. On 10 May 1943, 333 Squadron was formed from this flight with de Havilland Mosquito IIs at RAF Leuchars and Consolidated PBY Catalina IBs at Woodhaven. The Mosquitoes were operated on shipping reconnaissance flights along the Norwegian coast, whilst the Catalinas carried out anti-submarine patrols to the north of Scotland. The squadron's Catalinas also operated in the 'Special Duties' role landing both personnel and supplies at points along the Norwegian coast.

In September 1944 the Mosquito flight joined the Banff strike wing and acted in the Pathfinder role. However, on 30 May 1945 this flight was redesignated No. 334 (Norwegian) Squadron RAF and No. 333 became a pure Catalina unit.

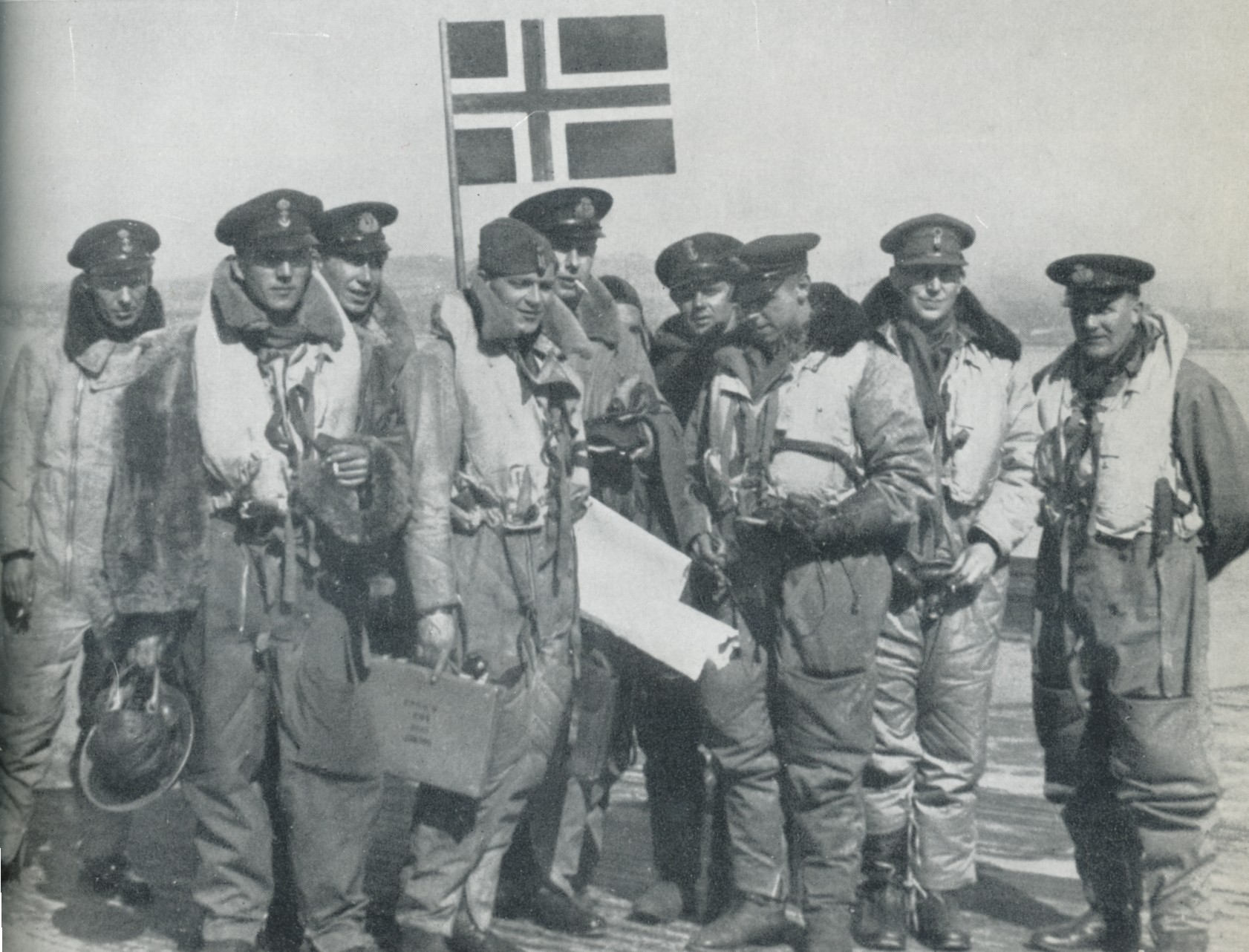
May 1942 : back from a mission over Norway. Nordahl Grieg 2nd from right

On their first mission to Norway, the poet, and news-reporter Nordahl Grieg was with 333 Squadron to report from the flight. This was then a secret mission. After this mission, he wrote the poem Flagget. During the Second World War, the missions of 333 Squadron included dangerous search-and-destroy submarine missions, patrolling, and secret missions along the Norwegian coastline, behind the German defence lines. They landed and picked up agents, illegal radios, and transmitters. They also dropped Christmas presents to the Norwegian population, and did search and rescue missions.

=== Post-war ===
After the war, the squadron returned to Norway, being based at Fornebu, helping to rebuild the northern parts of the country, transporting people and equipment from the south to the north. The oil-activity, establishment of the Norwegian economic zone, and establishment of the coast-guard, created new demands on the squadron. They had to carry out surveillance of large sea areas, requiring new airplanes, the Lockheed P-3 Orion.

In the 1980s the squadron undertook search-and-destroy submarine missions along the coastline and in the fjords.

The Boeing P-8 Poseidon was introduced in the summer of 2023, and the squadron was subsequently relocated to Evenes Air Station, while the P-3 Orion was phased out.

The squadron regularly does various missions, including surveillance of military maritime operations, patrolling the economic zone, controlling fishing and resources, submarine searches, and search and rescue missions. They also take part in international missions and training. The squadron is the only one that has been active continuously since World War II, and is part of the 133 Air Wing.

== Aircraft operated ==
From	To	Aircraft	Version
May 1942	Nov 1943	de Havilland Mosquito	II
May 1942	Feb 1945	Consolidated Catalina	Ib
Nov 1943	Feb 1945	de Havilland Mosquito	VI
May 1944	Nov 1945	Consolidated Catalina	IVa
1945	1954	Consolidated Catalina	PBY-5 (Vingtor, Jøssing, Viking, Ulabrand)
1954	1961	Consolidated Catalina	PBY-5A (21 aircraft in total) these were never owned by Norway, but were on loan to them
1961	1969	Grummann Albatross	HU-16 (amphibious)
1969	1989	Lockheed Orion	P-3B*
1989	2023	Lockheed Orion	P-3N
1989	2023	Lockheed Orion	P-3C Update III (Vingtor, Jøssing, Viking, Ulabrand)
2022	present	Boeing P-8 Poseidon	P-8A Poseidon

- = Two of the P-3Bs were modified to P-3N standard (Fritjof Nansen, Roald Amundsen, Gunnar Isachsen, Otto Sverdrup, Hjalmar Riiser Larsen, Bernt Balchen, Finn Lambrechts) Last operational flight with P-3C «Ulabrand» took place 30 Jun 2023.

== Bases operated from ==
From	To	Base	Remarks
May 1943	Aug 1944	RAF Leuchars	
May 1943	Jun 1945	Woodhaven, Scotland	Detachment
Aug 1944	Jun 1945	RAF Banff	
Jun 1945	1963	Fornebu, Sola	Detachments in Skattøra, Andøya, and Bodø.
1963	30 Jun 2023	Andøya Air Station, Norway	
30 Jun 2023	Present	Evenes Air Station, Norway	
