= A solas =

A solas (Spanish for "alone") may refer to:

- "A solas", a song by María Becerra from Animal
- "A solas", a song by Karol G from Unstoppable
- "A solas", a song by Lunay and Lyanno
- "A solas", a song by Rels B and Indigo Jams

== See also ==
- Solas (disambiguation)
