= Ivica Šola =

- Ivica Šola, 2026
- Born: 1968. Đakovo
- Occupations: theologian, communication scientist, columnist, professor

Ivica Šola (born 1968) is a Croatian theologian, communication scientist, columnist and university professor.

== Biography ==
Šola was born in 1968 in Đakovo. He received a bachelor's degree from University of Zagreb in 1994, a master's degree from Pontifical Lateran University in Rome (philosophy of Martin Buber) in 1998, and a doctoral degree in 2012 in Zagreb with a dissertation titled "Ethical aspects of philosophy of Luigi Pareyson: truth, ontos and freedom".

== Academic work ==
Šola is a full tenured professor at the Academy of Arts, University of Osijek, where he teaches courses in ethics, religion, culture and media theory. His main fields of scientific interest are interdisciplinary topics of philosophy, religion, culture, media, and society.

He has published many scholarly papers and essays in Croatian, English, Polish, Slovenian, German, and Italian, and a few academic books, among others:

1) Religion and Culture, Introduction to the Science of Religions (in Croatian)

2) Pareyson, Levinas and the Ethics of the Final, Facing neo-Paganism (in Croatian)

3) Theological Notebook, the World through Theological Eyes (in Croatian)

He was mentor to more than 100 M.A. students and Ph.D. students.

== Journalistic work ==
Since 2001, he has been active in journalism. He was a full-time commentator in the daily newspaper Glas Slavonije, the most influential newspaper in eastern Croatia with a long tradition, which began publication in 1920, where he also served as executive editor and editor of special editions. In the real economy sector, he was co-owner and chairman of the supervisory board of Glas Slavonije, deputy editor-in-chief and editor of the weekly supplement Magazin.

He has been publishing articles, commentaries, feuilletons, polemics and travelogues in almost all national daily newspapers or cultural periodicals and weeklies, especially in Novi list, Globus, Vjesnik, Vijenac, Večernji list and Slobodna Dalmacija. In addition to national daily newspapers, he has published texts in many media abroad: Večer (Slovenia), Movis (Switzerland), Svjetlo Riječi (Bosnia and Herzegovina), Sieci (Poland). He has also collaborated with large television companies with national concessions with which he had signed contracts as a political commentator and advisor, especially with RTL (parliamentary elections), Croatian Television (PressClub) and Z1. He was a contractual commentator, alongside Slobodan Prosperov Novak, on the HRT show "Pola ure kulture". In 1996 Šola was commentator of Biblical texts on Radio Vatican. Šola was informal adviser to two Croatian prime-ministers.

Together with Nikica Gović (editor-in-chief), he turned the semi-tabloid 7Dnevno into a serious political weekly magazine and connected it to the Dnevno.hr portal. As of 2026, 7Dnevno is the best-selling political weekly.

He participates in many public debates and television shows. As an editor and host, in 2025 he originated and created a new and unique television genre called "historytainment". In the show "Šola&Šola: Poglavniku nema tko da piše", Ivica Šola and Pero Šola apply the method of the French historical school, dealing with the everyday life of people instead of major events, based on archival material
