= Sora, Chile =

Sora
- Village
- Interactive map of Sora
- Country: Chile
- Region: Arica and Parinacota Region

Sora is a village in the Arica and Parinacota Region, Chile.
