= Sora (Japanese given name) =

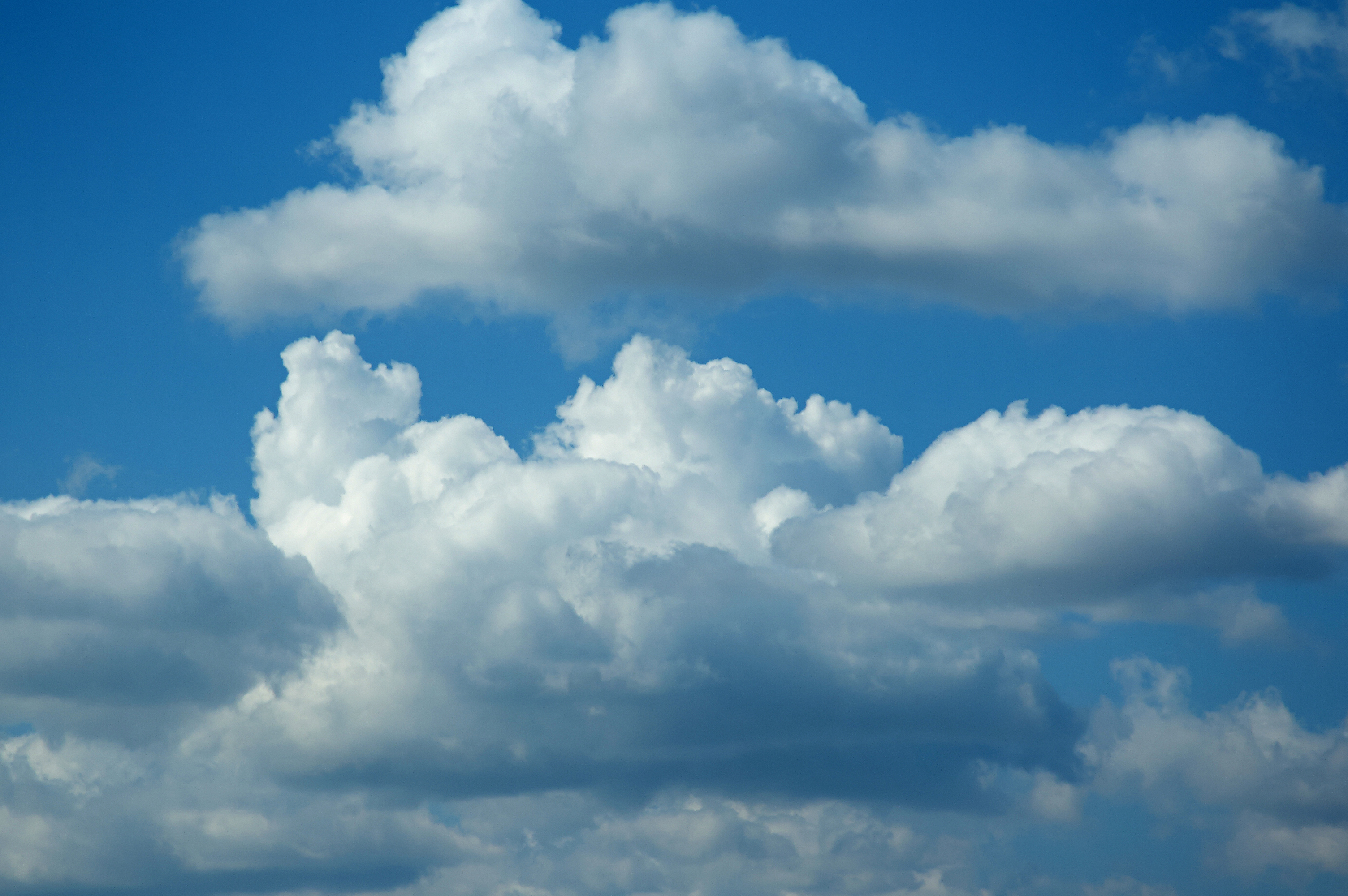
- Pronunciation: [so.ɾa]
- Gender: Unisex, Predominately Female
- Language: Japanese

Origin
- Meaning: sky, empty

Other names
- Alternative spelling: Sola

Sora (written: 天, 穹, 青空 or 曾良) is a unisex Japanese given name. Notable people with the name include:

== People ==
- Sora Amamiya (雨宮 天; born 1993), Japanese voice actress
- Sora Igawa (井川 空; born 2000), Japanese footballer
- Sora Inoue (illustrator), known for Samurai Girl: Real Bout High School
- Sora Izumikawa (イズミカワ ソラ; born 1971), Japanese artist, singer-songwriter, voice actress, composer and producer
- Kawai Sora (河合 曾良), Japanese poet
- Sora Kobori (小堀 空; born 2002), Japanese footballer
- Sora Ma (born 1984), Malaysian born Singaporean actress
- Sora Ogawa (小川 大空; born 1999), Japanese footballer
- Sora Shirai (白井 空良; born 2001), Japanese professional skateboarder
- Sora Tokui (徳井 青空; born 1989), Japanese voice actress and singer
- Sola Aoi (蒼井 そら, Sora Aoi), stage name of Japanese AV idol, model, and media personality

== Fictional characters ==
- Sora (.hack), character from the Japanese multimedia project .hack
- Sora (Kingdom Hearts), main character in the video game series Kingdom Hearts
- Sora, one of the main characters of the anime No Game No Life
- Sora, character in the Japanese anime Naruto Shippuden
- Sora Aoi (manga), character in the Japanese manga series Aki Sora
- Sora Harewataru, character from the Japanese anime series Soaring Sky! Pretty Cure
- Sora Harukawa, character from Ensemble Stars!
- Sora Inoue, brother of Orihime Inoue, a character in the anime/manga series Bleach
- Sora Kasugano, character from the Japanese visual novel Yosuga no Sora
- Sora Naegino, character in the Japanese anime series Kaleido Star
- Sora Otosumi, protagonist of the Japanese tokusatsu series Kamen Rider MY-TH
- Tokino Sora (ときの そら), a virtual YouTuber character, affiliated with Hololive Production
- Sora Perse, a character in the Japanese anime series Yu-Gi-Oh! Arc-V
- Sora Sosuke, character in the video game Yandere Simulator
- Sora Takanashi, character in the Japanese light novel series Listen to Me, Girls. I Am Your Father!
- Sora Takenouchi, character in the Japanese anime series Digimon Adventure
- Sora Takeuchi, character in the Japanese manga series Air Gear

== See also ==
- Sola (disambiguation)
- Sora (disambiguation)
