= Andøya Air Station =

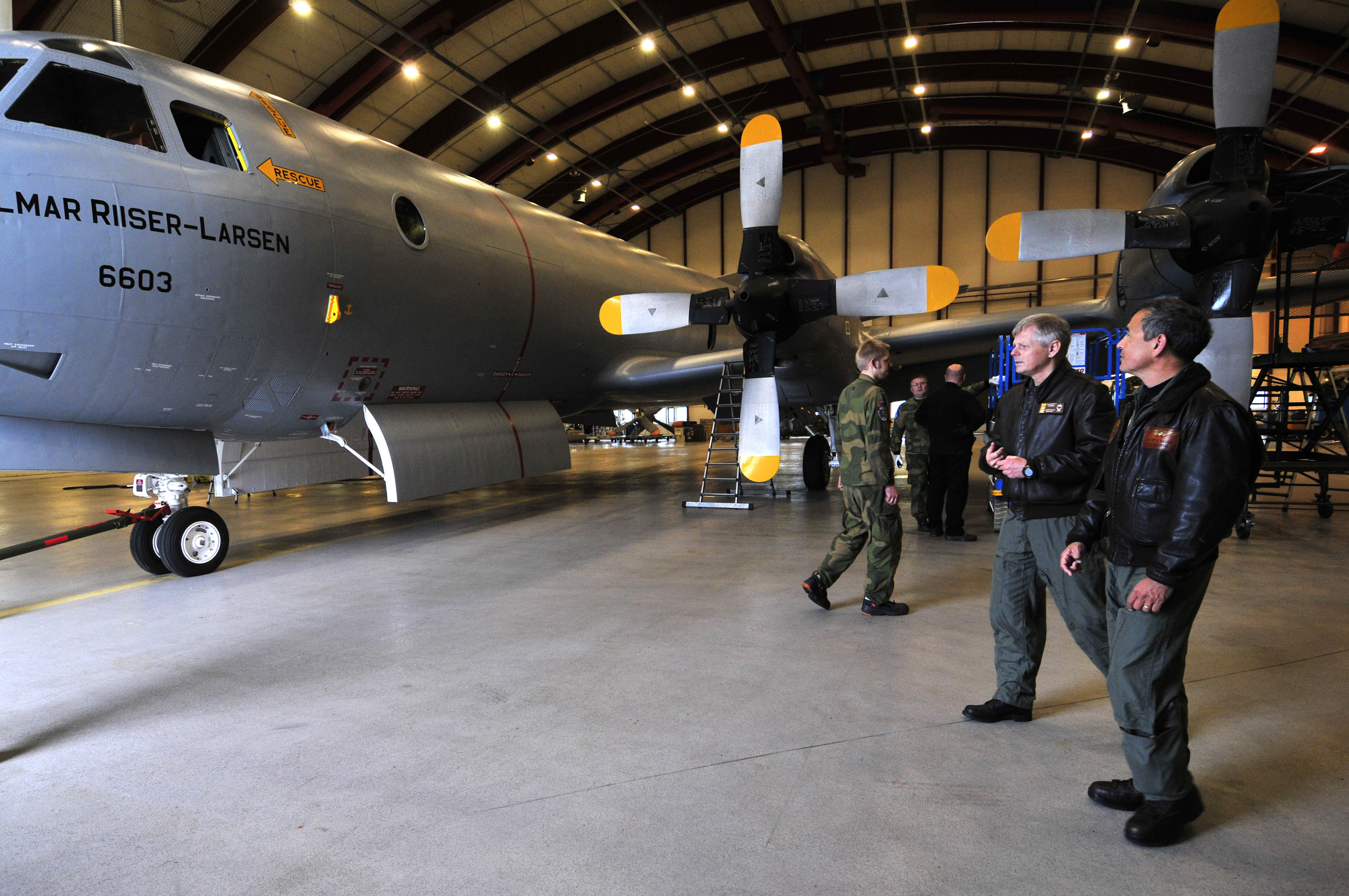
- A Norwegian P-3 Orion aircraft at Andøya, in 2011.
- IATA: ANX; ICAO: ENAN

Summary
- Airport type: Military/Public
- Operator: Royal Norwegian Air Force
- Serves: Andenes
- Elevation AMSL: 43 ft (13 m)
- Coordinates: 69°17′33″N 016°08′39″E

Map
- Location in Norway Andøya (Nordland)

Runways
Direction	Length		Surface
Direction	ft	m	Surface
03/21	5,486	1,672(Closed)	Asphalt
14/32	8,097	2,468	Asphalt

Andøya Air Station (Norwegian: Andøya Flystasjon) is a military air station in Andøy Municipality in Nordland county, Norway. The station is located near the village of Andenes at the northern end of the island of Andøya in the Vesterålen archipelago. 333 Squadron of the Royal Norwegian Air Force was based here with Lockheed P-3C Orions. As of Q2 2024, the government has made a proposal in regard to reverting an earlier decision to close the airbase.

The civil airport Andøya Airport, Andenes and the civilian sounding rocket launch facility Andøya Rocket Range are also located nearby.

== History ==
The first idea of building a military airport was launched at a NATO meeting in Lisbon in 1951. In March 1952 the Norwegian Minister of Defence, Nils Langhelle announced that the airport was going to be built. There were multiple suggested locations, and the decision fell on the village Haugnes. The entire village with 310 residents was expropriated to give enough area for the airport. The community at Andøy only had 2000 residents at the time, and a large growth was expected.

A Douglas Dakota was the first aircraft landing on September 17, 1954. The air station was operational from the fall of 1957. The headquarters were located about 13 km away at Skarsteindalen, as part of NATOs spread tactic. In 1961 the first squadron, the 333, was moved to the air station, from Sola Air Station, with HU-16B Albatross aircraft.

After a period of solely military use, civilian services commenced on April 2, 1964. The first scheduled commercial flight was flown by Scandinavian Airlines with a Metropolitan. In 1968 the second runway was completed. In the 1970s the airport became part of the new network of regional airports in Lofoten and Vesterålen with government subsidised operations using de Havilland DHC-6 Twin Otter aircraft seating 20 and operated by Widerøe.

In 1969 the Albatrosses were replaced by P-3B Orion aircraft. The P-3B lacked the ability to work with the Norwegian Coast Guard, and in 1989 they were sold to the Spanish Air Force. They were replaced with new P-3C aircraft. Following the end of the Cold War in the 1990s the air station has been reduced.

The Norwegian parliament decided in November 2016 to close the air station. Prior to 30 June 2023, the station was the base for the 333 squadron. Since 30 June 2023, that squadron operates from Evenes Air Station. According to a white paper from the Defense Ministry in 2022, Andøya will be a “permanent military reception base for allied forces.”

== Accidents and incidents ==
- On February 1, 1982, a Lockheed SR-71, tail number 980, diverted to the airport. It stayed there four days before being flown out.
- On July 31, 1988, four people died when a private Cessna 172 aircraft crashed west of the airport just after takeoff.
- As of June 2025, large portions of the maneuvering area at Andøya Air Station have been closed due to surface damage, with significant uncertainty if and when repairs will be carried out.

== See also ==
- List of the largest airports in the Nordic countries
