= Sora (Anatolia) =

Ancient and Byzantine town in Paphlagonia

Coordinates: 41°08′23″N 32°37′21″E

Sora was a town of ancient Anatolia in the borderlands between ancient Bithynia and Paphlagonia, inhabited in Byzantine times.

Its site is located near Zora, Asiatic Turkey.
