= Evenes Air Station =

Norwegian military airbase

- IATA: EVE; ICAO: ENEV

Summary
- Airport type: Forward Air Station
- Operator: Royal Norwegian Air Force
- Serves: Harstad and Narvik, Norway
- Location: Evenes, Nordland, Norway
- Elevation AMSL: 26 m (85 ft)
- Coordinates: 68°29′20″N 016°40′42″E

Map
- Location within Norway

Runways
Direction	Length		Surface
Direction	m	ft	Surface
17/35	2,812	9,226	Asphalt

Evenes Air Station is a military airbase of the Royal Norwegian Air Force (RNoAF) located just north of the village of Evenes in Evenes Municipality in Nordland county, Norway.

== History ==
The air station was initially opened in 1979 as a hub for Bodø Main Air Station, but became an independent entity in 1988. Infrastructure includes 36 third generation hardened shelters with enough space for daily operations of F-35, although a smaller number of shelters have been updated. Operations at Evenes were reduced in 1993 and the station was taken out of full operational use.

In 2012, the parliament decided to turn Evenes into a forward air base for Quick Reaction Alert. The air station will have a capacity for stationing a QRA of 15 fighter aircraft, as well as handling exercises with allied aircraft. The air station is estimated to produce 1,600 aircraft movements per year once operative.

From 1 January 2020, the new 133 Luftving was reestablished at Evenes, making Evenes the home base of Norway's fleet of 5 Boeing P-8 Poseidon.

The first F-35 squadron started operations from Evenes in September 2021.

U.S Marine Corps, Marine Fighter Attack Squadron VMFA-542 deployed to Evenes air station in February 2024. This was their first deployment with F-35B. In April that same year, a critical communications cable outside the base's parameter was found to have been sabotaged.

In the spring of 2025, the United States Navy patrol squadron VP-1 “Screaming Eagles” was deployed to Evenes Air Station. Operating the P-8A Poseidon maritime patrol aircraft, the squadron conducted a range of surveillance and reconnaissance missions in the Barents Sea and the Baltic Sea. Amerikanerne opererer ut fra Evenes – mot russiske Kaliningrad i Østersjøen

On 12 March 2026, Norwegian defence minister stated that an anti drone system, counter-unmanned aerial systems (CUAS), was operational at Evenes.

== Operations ==
Evenes Air Station is the main base for the Royal Norwegian Air Force in Northern Norway. The Norwegian Defence Estates Agency was commissioned to ensure that sufficient construction (EBA) and infrastructure are in place by August 2022. Test operations together with the Armed Forces and the Air Force are expected to start at the same time. By the end of the first quarter of 2023, all EBA should be ready for the Armed Forces for full operation. What will be built on Evenes will cover the national needs of maritime patrol aircraft, as well as consist of offices and administrative facilities for the 333 Squadron.

Additionally, adaptation of hangars and the construction of facilities for the F-35, new construction of office buildings, officers' quarters, crew quarters and a hospital, as well as security measures will be constructed. The largest construction assignment is the P-8 hangar with associated operational surfaces, which will be ready in 2021/22. Runway arresting gear has been installed for the new fighter jets.

Evenes is the home base for the Royal Norwegian Air Force fleet of Boeing P-8 Poseidon, used for surveillance of the Barents Sea and the northern part of the Norwegian Sea. The first operational flights started in April 2023, and from 1.July 2023, the P8 Poseidon have taken over the responsibilities from their predecessor P3C Orion.

Evenes Air Station has integrated air defence with an air defence batalion with Nasams III as main weapon, and there is also base defense. By 2025, it is planned that there will be up to 500 employees and 300 conscripts at Evenes.
