= Bodø Main Air Station =

Military air base in Bodø, Norway

Bodø Air Station Bodø hovedflystasjon
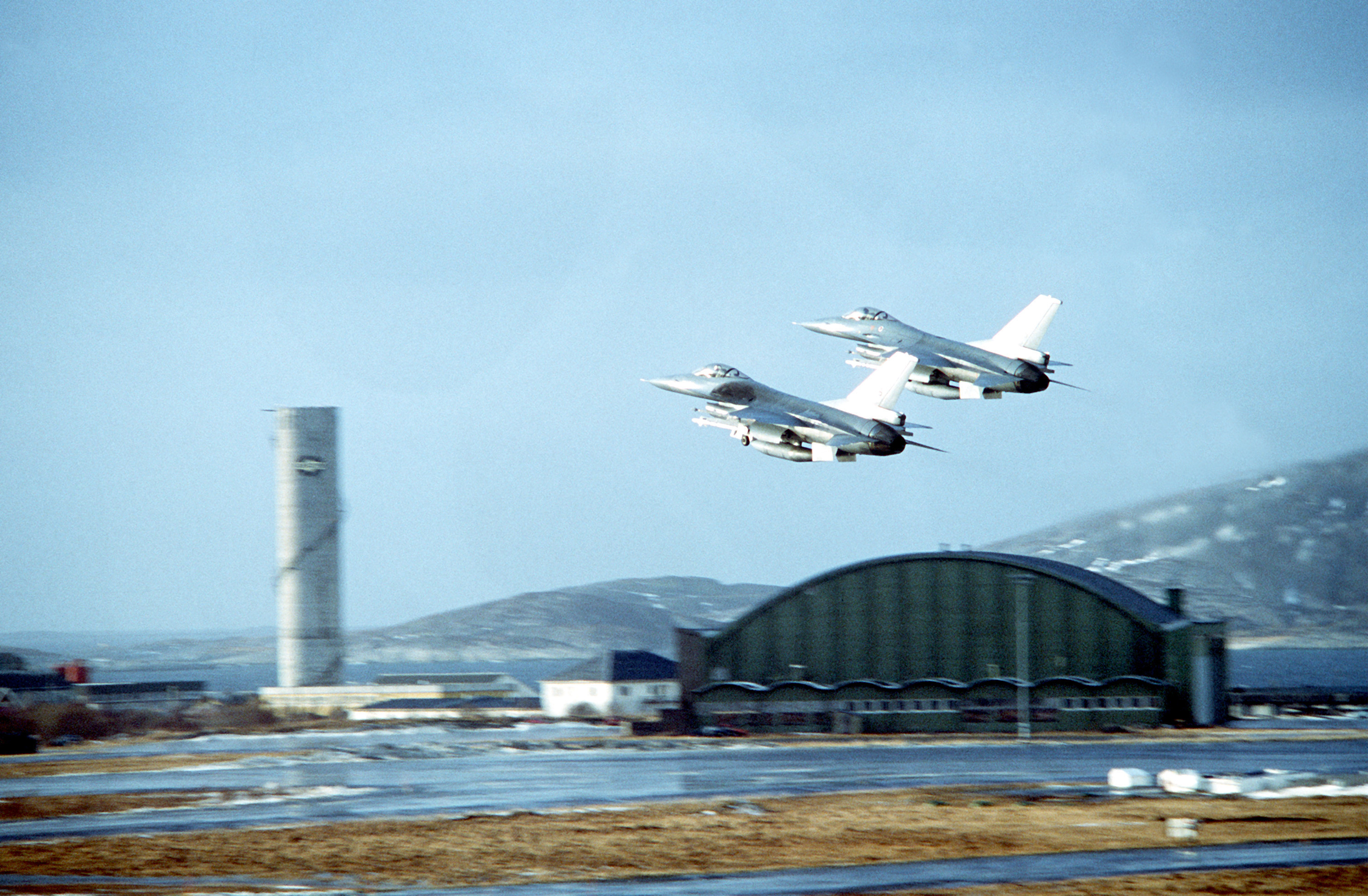
- Two F-16 fighters taking off from Bodø in 1982
- IATA: BOO; ICAO: ENBO

Summary
- Airport type: Joint (military and civil)
- Operator: Royal Norwegian Air Force
- Serves: Bodø
- Elevation AMSL: 13 m (43 ft)
- Coordinates: 67°16′09″N 14°21′55″E
- Website: www.mil.no/luft/start/omlf/stasjoner/bodo/

Map
- Location in Norway

Runways
Direction	Length		Surface
Direction	m	ft	Surface
07–25	3,394	11,136	Concrete

Bodø Air Station (IATA: BOO, ICAO: ENBO) is a military air base of the Royal Norwegian Air Force (RNoAF) located in the town of Bodø in Bodø Municipality, Nordland county, Norway.

The base is home for a detachment of AgustaWestland AW101 search and rescue (SAR) helicopters of the 330 Squadron.

The base was, until 2022, the home base for NATO's Quick Reaction Alert (QRA) mission. The mission is now carried out by F-35s from Evenes Air Station, located in Nordland county. Bodø serves as the main air station for Northern Norway and shares its 3,394-meter (11,135 ft) runway with Bodø Airport.

The first airfield was a simple wooden runway built in May 1940 by Allied forces during the Norwegian Campaign (8 April–10 June 1940) of World War II. The airfield was quickly bombed by the Luftwaffe, who chose to build a new airport in the same location. It remained in German use until 1945, when it was taken over by the RNoAF. Upgradation to North Atlantic Treaty Organization (NATO) standards started in 1950, and fighters have been stationed at Bodø since 1955. Aircraft previously stationed are the F-84 Thunderjet, the F-86 Sabre and the F-104 Starfighter. The air station will be closed with the delivery of the F-35 Lightning II, and only the SAR detachment will remain.

== History ==
=== World War II ===
The first military aircraft to land in Bodø was a Hansa-Brandenburg aircraft of the Royal Norwegian Navy Air Service which landed in July 1922. From the mid-1930s, regular seaplane flights were started from Bodø to Southern Norway. Two military Tiger Moth aircraft were sent from Trøndelag to scout the Bodø area for a possible site to land aircraft, and landed at Rønvikjordene. From 1935 additional aircraft missions were carried out to the area. In 1939 a plan for establishing airports in Nordland was made, which included a main air station at Bardufoss and five other smaller airport, including Rønvik. At the time of the break-out of World War II in Norway in April 1940, construction had yet to start. At the time both Germany and the United Kingdom believed that there was an airport in Bodø.

During the Norwegian Campaign, the German troops were isolated in Narvik and the Allies decided to build an airport in the yet unoccupied Bodø area to allow air raids against German troops in a flanking maneuver in combination with Bardufoss Air Station, located in Troms county. A 540-by-35-meter (1,772 by 115 ft) airstrip made of peat and nets was built at Hernes in the course of twelve days in May. During construction German aircraft practiced landing on the strip, flying just 10 meters (33 ft) above. A detachment of the Royal Air Force's 263 Squadron with sixteen Gloster Gladiator aircraft was stationed at Bodø from 21 May and 46 Squadron with eight Hawker Hurricane. The aircraft were used for raids on German aircraft in Saltdalen and evacuate Allied soldiers in Rognan on 26 May. The following day, ten German Junkers Ju 87, escorted by four Messerschmitt Bf 110, bombed the airport. In the evening the Luftwaffe bombed not only the rest of the airport, but also the town.

German forces captured Bodø on 1 June and immediately started preparing for a new airstrip. By August a 900-meter (3,000 ft) runway was finished and the work was completed by April 1941 with a 1,200-by-80-meter (3,940 by 260 ft) runway, in addition to various buildings. The need for the airport was both to counteract Allied raids and to allow reinforcements for a planned attack on the Soviet Union. At first fighters and reconnaissance aircraft were stationed at Bodø, but later also bombers. From January to April 1942 the Luftwaffe dispatched the 7th Squadron of the Jagdgeschwader 5 to Bodø, consisting of fifteen Messerschmitt Bf 109.

New squadrons, largely of Ju 87s, were stationed in Bodø. However, there were no Allied raids, so the aircraft were sent to the Murmansk Front. Throughout the war the Wehrmacht built "Festung Bodø", consisting of army, navy and air force installations, including starting work on a concrete runway to replace the wooden runway. From the fall of 1944, Bodø again received an increasing number of aircraft, as Germany moved their fleet northwards following Finnish capitulation. Up to forty fighters plus other aircraft were stationed at the airport. When Germany capitulated on 8 May 1945 there were thirty aircraft at the airport.

=== Reestablishment ===
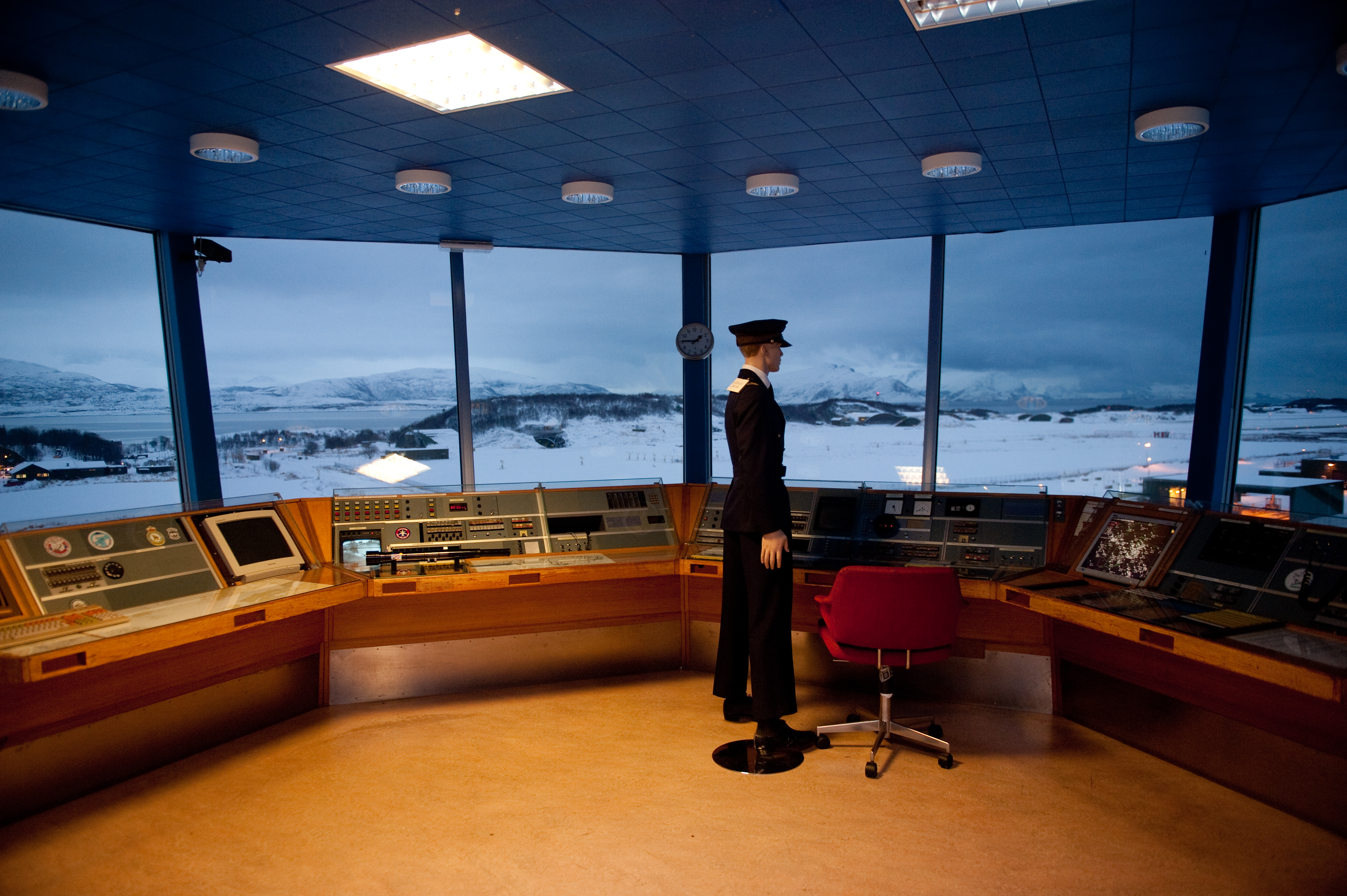
The old control tower in Bodø, now part of the Norwegian Aviation Museum

Upon the German capitulation, the airport was taken over by the Norwegian Armed Forces. At first the airport was staffed by Germans, but operations were quickly taken over by Norwegians. All but a few Fiesler Storch aircraft were destroyed by the RAF. The Air Force decided to keep the airport operational and stationed thirty men for its operation. It was mostly used as a layover for aircraft flying between Bardufoss and Værnes Air Station. During this period, the airport consisted of an officers' mess, two barracks, three hangars, a fire station, an air traffic control building and some smaller buildings. Some of the wood was used for reconstruction, and by 1948 the runway was 1,000 by 50 meters (3,280 by 160 ft).

After the war, there was military agreement that Bardufoss should be the main air station for Northern Norway, and Bodø would not station any aircraft. The Air Force saw the strategic advantage of a second air station in Northern Norway, although it was at first the civilian needs for an airport that were most interested in an upgrade of Bodø. By 1949, internal notes within the Air Force were discussing the possibilities of moving the command center for the Air Force in Northern Norway to Bodø. During 1948, following incidents such as the Czechoslovak coup d'état of 1948, the Berlin Blockade and increased Soviet pressure on Finland, the Norwegian government increased military spending, and Norway became a founding member of NATO the following year.

Norway thus shifted its military strategy towards holding the country until allied forces could be dispatched. Northern Norway became a central part of this strategy because of NATO's north flank in the Norway–Soviet Union border, and Norway planned to have two fighter squadrons and one reconnaissance squadron in the north. The Ministry of Defense awarded NOK 3.7 million in 1950 to expand Bodø's runway to 2,700 meters (8,900 ft), with construction starting in October. The rest of the air station was designed through a main plan which was completed on 30 July 1951. The civilian sector was placed north of the runway, on the town side, while the military sector was placed south.

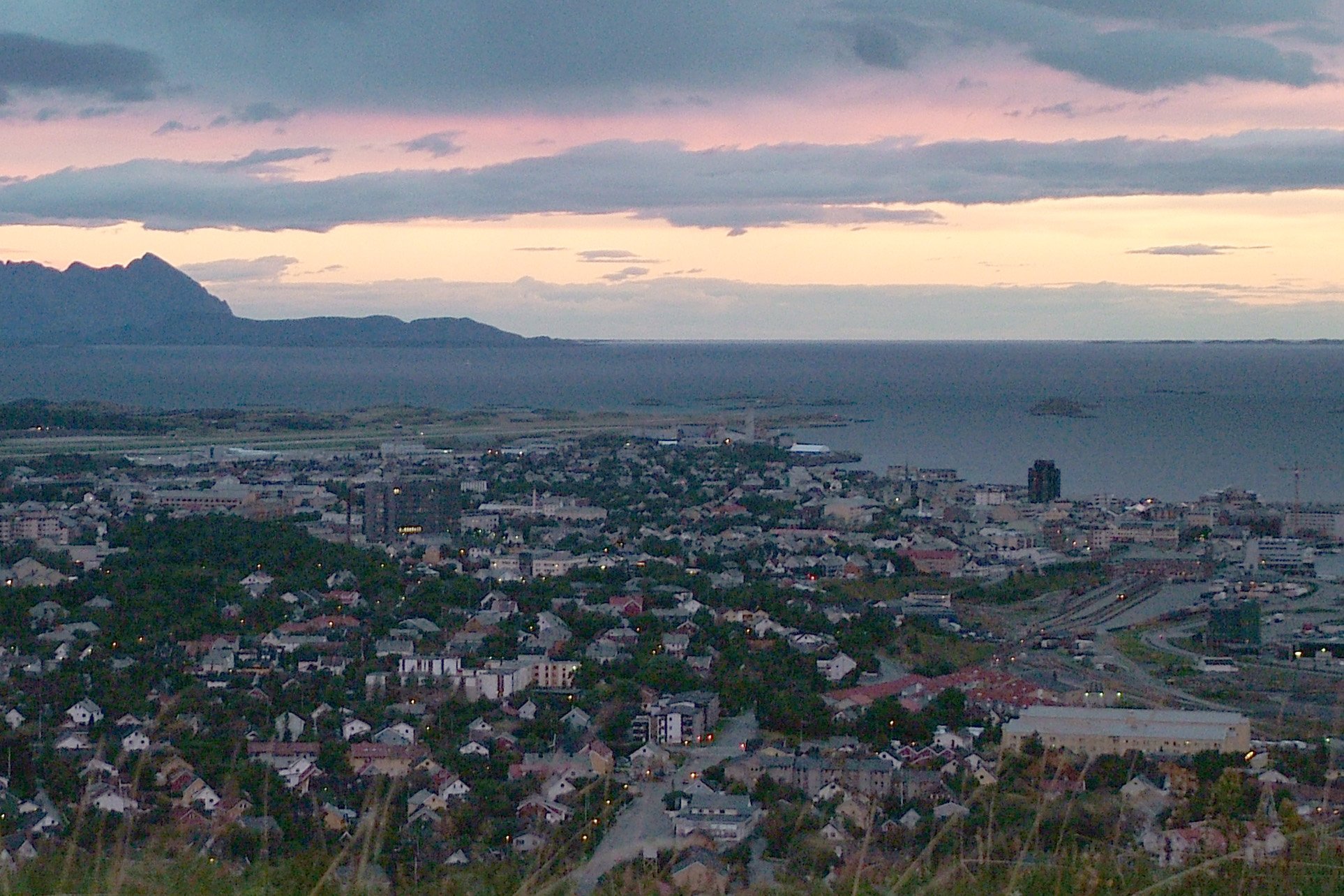
An overview of central Bodø showing the town center to the right and the airfield to the left

The military expropriated the entire peninsula south of the runway. The location of the airport was at the time controversial, mostly because of expropriation of agricultural land. Alternative locations were considered such as at Straumøya and Fauskemyrene, but Bodø was preferred by civilian authorities because of its proximity to the town. Later, two other major concerns, which were not evident at the time, would arise. First, the air station's occupation of the central location meant that Bodø would spread out west-east, giving a less compact cityscape. Second, introduction of new aircraft would create significant noise pollution.

Funding was increased further from 1951, as it was considered as an advance on common alliance infrastructure, resulting in a further NOK 5.5 million for Bodø. The following year the government decided to acquire the F-84 Thunderjet, which required a 120-meter (390 ft) longer runway than was being installed. Civilian traffic commenced on 12 May 1952. The first detachment of aircraft were stationed during the exercise Main Brace from 13 to 25 September, before the base was completed. Parliament decided in 1952 that Bodø would become the main air station for Northern Norway and that Air Force Command for Northern Norway would move from Bardufoss on 1 July 1953. The first aircraft to be stationed at Bodø was a Bell 47 in May 1954, and two new de Havilland Canada DHC-3 Otters from July. Bodø was found ready to host squadrons in 1955, and was allocated the 331 and 334 Squadrons of F-84Gs previously based at Sola Air Station. The 334 moved to Bodø in mid July, while 331 moved in late August. A ground-controlled approach system was installed at Bodø in 1955.

Parallel to the construction of the air station, air defense batteries were built at nine locations, including 88-millimeter (3.5 in) batteries at Skipsholmen, Geitvågen, Landbruksskolen, Hernesskagen and Bestemorsenga. Several of these were upgrades of existing German installations. The air defense was completed in 1953. It became part of the Air Force in 1958, and L70 batteries were installed. Construction of a base in Bodin Municipality was completed in July 1954, which was used for training. From 1959, a troop of M24 Chaffee tanks were stationed at Bodin to strengthen the air defense. Housing for enlisted crew and their families was secured through prefabricated fourplexes which were built in town. Later, additional housing was constructed, in part through housing cooperatives. A network of radar stations was built throughout Northern Norway in the late 1950s. These were from 1956 headquartered at Hernes, which included one of two command and reporting centers for the region.

=== Cold War ===
The F-84s were replaced by the F-86 Sabre in mid and late 1958. During two periods in 1958 and 1959 the runway was extended further, and the aircraft were for these periods stationed at Bardufoss and Andøya Air Station. A support wing was transferred from Skattøra in 1959 and consisted of two Bell 47, two Sikorsky H-19 and five Otters. From 20 August 1960, the 334 Squadron replaced its F-86F with F-86K, which included radar and were thus better suited for reconnaissance. As there was need for additional fighters in Bodø, the 339 Squadron of F-86Ks was transferred from Gardermoen Air Station in September. With these realignments, the air station was rebuilt and expanded to handle more aircraft.

In case a war broke out between NATO and the Soviet Union, the fighter aircraft stationed in Bodø were to support NATO's Atomic Strike Plan, which would see US Strategic Air Command (SAC) bomber aircraft drop nuclear warheads over the base of the Soviet Northern Fleet. Norwegian fighter pilots trained on techniques for dropping nuclear bombs, but the battle plans called for them to be used for reconnaissance and precision bombing of radar and communications targets with conventional bombs. With the introduction of intercontinental ballistic missiles, SAC's interest for Bodø dwindled from 1959.

Norway agreed in 1955 that both US and UK reconnaissance flights could operate out of Bodø and other northern airports, given they not violate Soviet air space. American U-2 aircraft, used for high-altitude reconnaissance over Soviet territory, were first operated out of Bodø in 1958. The U-2 shoot-down on 1 May 1960, where the aircraft was heading for Bodø, had a severe negative impact on Norway's relations both with the Soviet Union and the United States. In the aftermath, Soviet First Secretary Nikita Khrushchev threatened to bomb Bodø Main Air Station as he regarded it as a strategic target. This was the first Soviet threat of targeting Norway with nuclear weapons.

SAC was given thirty days to withdraw its communications personnel from Bodø and prohibited allies from using Norwegian airports for flights in international airspace east of the 24th meridian east. Minister of Defense Gudmund Harlem withdrew on 18 February 1961, largely because of his lack of control over Colonel Vilhelm Evang at Bodø and his liberal permissions to US reconnaissance missions. Evang on his side had given permission largely because of misleading information from the Central Intelligence Agency regarding the nature of their missions.

The 332 Squadron switched to F-86K in 1962 and relocated a substantial portion of the Bodø aircraft. Squadrons 334 and 339 were merged in April 1963, with 334 responsible for operations and 339 for the technical aspects. 339 was closed later in 1963. On 7 August, the first thirteen F-104 Starfighters were delivered to Bodø. The increased noise, especially from use of afterburners during take-off, resulted in significantly more noise pollution in town and became a major concern among the residents. As the Sabres were used for interception, the Starfighters were at first used as fighter-bombers.

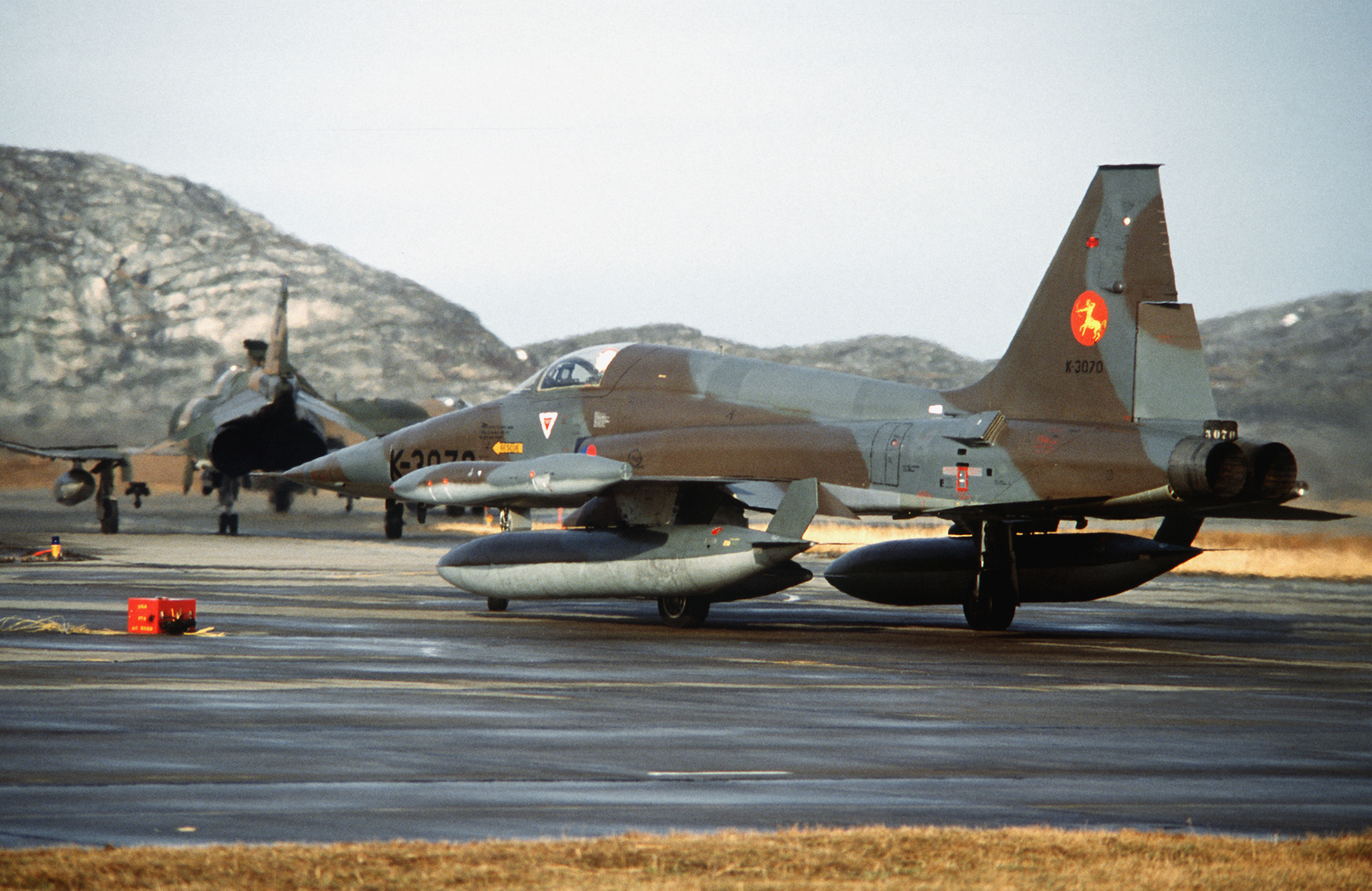
A Dutch F-5 Freedom Fighter at Bodø in 1982

Bodø received a split strategic role during the 1960s. From Norway's point of view it was largely used to control the air space and intercept Soviet aircraft in Norway air space. Because of the Sabres' limited range, they were often deployed at Banak Air Station. For NATO, Bodø was largely a site for exercises and reinforcements in case of war. The 719 Squadron was created on 1 January 1966 and consisted of the four helicopters and five Otters which had previously been designated as the 7193 Support Wing. The newly created squadron received its first Bell UH-1 helicopter in late 1966 and the first de Havilland Canada DHC-6 Twin Otter in mid 1967. The Sabres were replaced by the F-5 Freedom Fighters from 1967. This involved a swap of roles, whereby the Starfighters took on the role as interception aircraft, and the Freedom Fighters, which lacked radar and advanced navigation equipment, took on the role as fighter-bombers.

The central command for Northern Norway was unified at Bodin from 1967, and moved into a new operations' center at Reita outside Bodø in 1971. International exercises and squadron exchanges became increasingly common throughout the late 1960s, with annual exercises in Bodø. A nearly annual visitor was the Royal Netherlands Air Force 314 Squadron as part of Allied Command Europe Mobile Force to protect NATO's northern flank. Most exercises were carried out during the fall and winter and was important for the air station to practice reception of allied reinforcements and flexible use of area. These included the Supreme Allied Commander Atlantic-organized land and amphibian Team-Work every fourth years from 1964, the annual Express under the Supreme Allied Commander Europe, Northern Wedding every fourth year from 1970, and Ocean Safari every other year from 1975.

The Ministry of Justice started the process of establishing a search and rescue service in the late 1960s. The plans to order ten Westland Sea Kings were passed by Parliament in 1970. The 330 Squadron was recreated on 25 April 1973 and based at Bodø. Three detachments were created, at Sola, Ørland and Banak. This allowed any part of the coast to be reached within ninety minutes. From the 1970s, NATO became increasingly concerned about protecting grounded aircraft for nuclear warfare and sixteen underground hangars were built between 1973 and 1975.

In an effort to rationalize operations and renew the fighter inventory, Norway took delivery of twenty-two used CF-104 Starfighters from the Royal Canadian Air Force. These were stationed with the 334 Squadron in order to exploit commonality with the F-104s already stationed in Bodø. Unlike the F-104, the CF-104 was built as a fighter-bomber, but radar was retrofitting before entering Norwegian service. The aircraft's primary role was naval bombardment. During larger exercises, the 334 Squadron would routinely relocate to Bardufoss. Bodø became one of nine co-located operating bases (COB), following an agreement between the Norwegian Armed Forces and the USAF in May 1974. This involved permanent storage of ammunition, parts and equipment, as well as a tighter organizational cooperation, with the USAF.

The Soviet Union built a steadily increasing military presence on the Kola Peninsula during the 1970s, leading to both a Norwegian and a NATO interest in strengthening Bodø. Soviet aircraft would routinely operate westward in international airspace in the Barents Sea and Norwegian Sea. The fighters at Bodø were therefore frequently scrambled to reconnaissance and intercept such aircraft, and were occasionally the first NATO aircraft to photograph new Soviet aircraft. Norway did not allow allied aircraft to carry out identification missions.

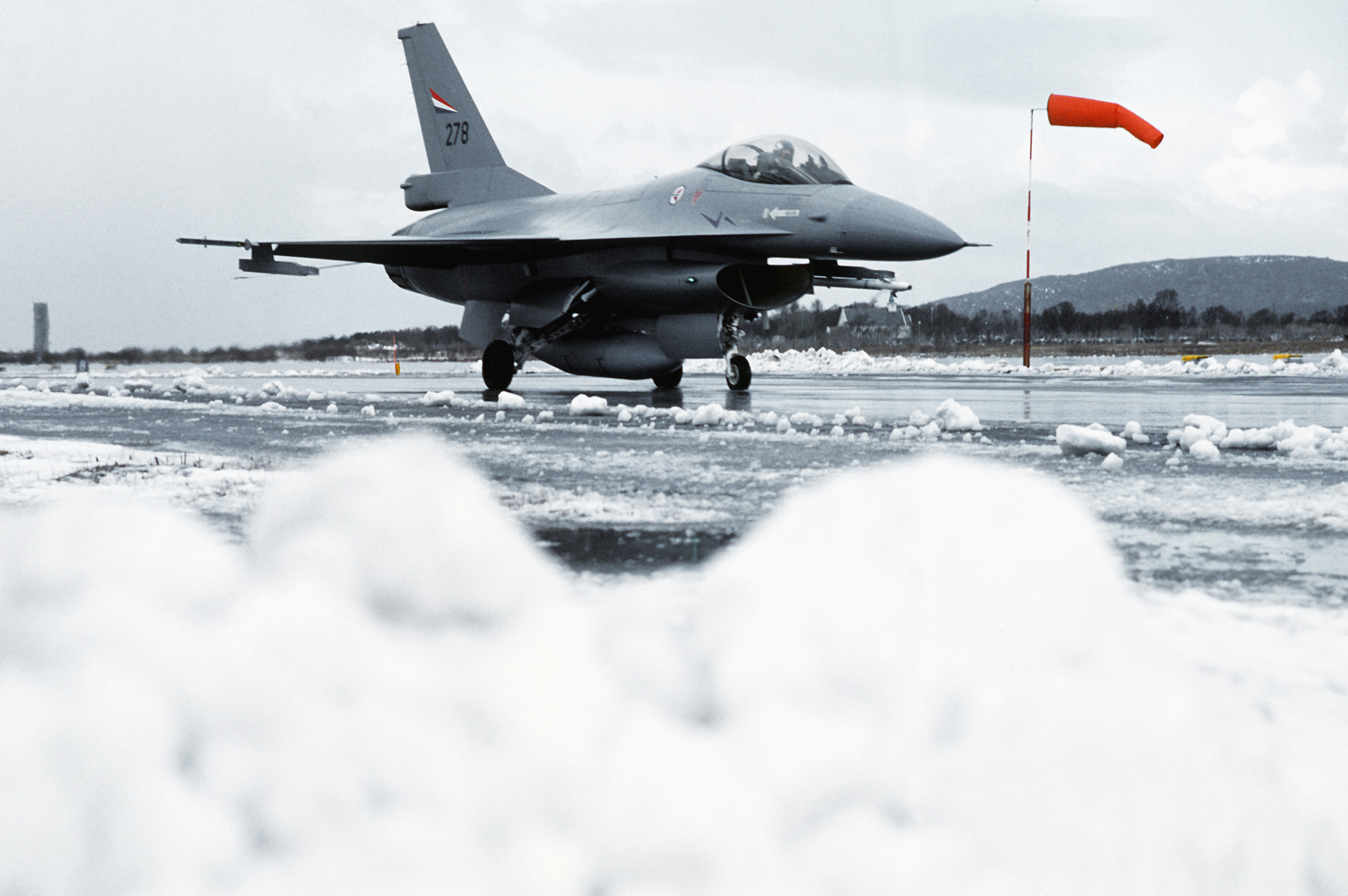
An F-16 at Bodø

Norway chose to purchase the F-16 Fighting Falcon in 1975, with two of the four squadrons to be stationed in Bodø. The first F-16 was delivered to Bodø in February 1982 and the last CF-104 was retired on 22 April 1983. Bodø experienced an acute lack of pilots during the early in 1980s, and in 1984 there were more fighters than pilots. This was balanced with a lack of technicians. The deployment as COB was completed in 1985. The air force had originally planned during the 1970s to upgrade to the Roland II air defense system, but chose to install six I-Hawk batteries between 1985 1987. During the 1980s, both U-2 and SR-71 Blackbirds used Bodø as a reserve airport.

=== Later history ===
With an increasing allied presence on the northern flank, Bodø was set for a large NATO-financed upgrade starting in late 1989. Costing NOK 670 million, it included new underground hangars, 2,000 meters (6,600 ft) new taxiways, an extension of the parallel taxiway to 4,000 meters (13,000 ft), a 1.8-hectare (4.4-acre) apron, a new 1,800-meter (5,900 ft) parallel taxiway north of the runway, and filling in 40 hectares (99 acres) of sea west of the airfield. The upgrades also included 43 underground hangars and a new fire station. The upgrades were completed in 1993 and were largely funded by NATO.

From 1990, the 719 Squadron replaced its helicopters with Bell 412. However, these were later moved to the 330 Squadron, with the 719 becoming a pure Twin Otter operator. Passenger transport was reorganized from 25 October 1992, whereby the military's charter flights were terminated and the military instead bought tickets with scheduled flights. As part of this reorganization, the military air terminal was closed and the service moved to the civilian terminal. In 1996 and 1997, the Hawk system was replaced with the Norwegian Adapted Surface-to-Air Missile System (NASAMS).

Following the 2008 decision to purchase the F-35 Lightning II, the Norwegian Armed Forces carried out an analysis of its air base structure. The military wanted to reduce the number of bases for the F-35 to one, with Bardufoss, Bodø, Evenes and Ørland being the prime candidates. Ørland, with an advanced base at Evenes, was selected because of its location centrally in Norway and its existing squadron of F-16s. The increased noise levels of the F-35 became a major concern during the evaluation of Bodø, as the air station's proximity to the town would create even higher levels of noise pollution. This would have required the runway to be moved southwestwards, incurring high costs. At the same time, Bodø lacked proper training areas and would give less flexibility in a forty-year perspective. This will cause Bodø Main Air Station to be closed, although the 330 Squadron detachment will remain.

The base were home to the F-16 Fighting Falcons of the 331 and 332 Squadrons before F-16 were phased out of the RNoAF. The squadrons were moved to Ørland Main Air Station in 2023, with F-35s.

== Operations ==
The 330 Squadron has a detachment with AgustaWestland AW101 SAR Queen helicopters at Bodø. The detachment flew 367 missions and 840 hours in 2009. The SAR Queens primary role is for search and rescue (SAR) mission, with a portfolio northwards to central Troms and southward throughout Nordland. In SAR missions, the squadron operates under the management of the Joint Rescue Coordination Centre of Northern Norway located in downtown Bodø. The detachment's secondary responsibility is as an air ambulance, in which it is under management of Nordland Hospital Trust.

== Civilian sector ==
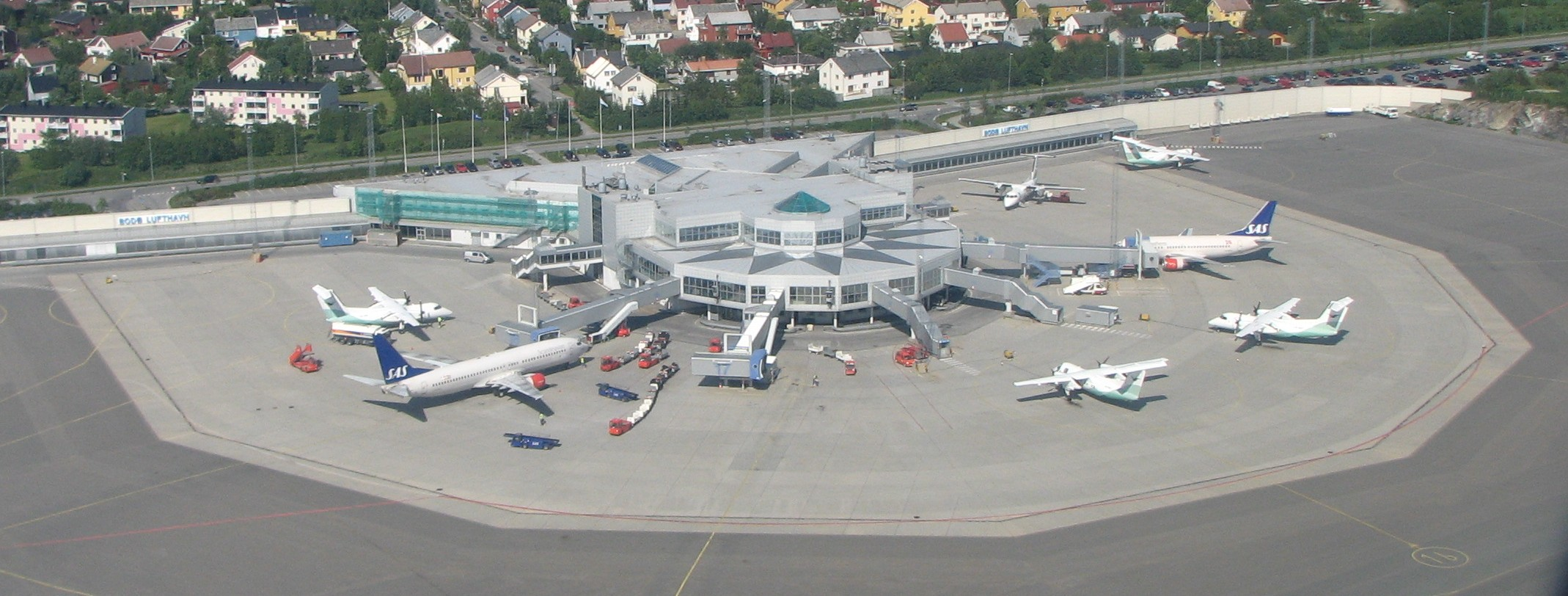
The passenger terminal of Bodø Airport, with five Bombardier Dash 8 aircraft of Widerøe and two Boeing 737 of Scandinavian Airlines on the apron

The Norwegian Aviation Museum is located on the premises of Bodø Airport. Bodø is also home to the Civil Aviation Authority of Norway and Bodø Air Traffic Control Center.
