= Lee So-ra (volleyball) =

South Korean volleyball player (born 1987)

Lee So-ra (Korean: 이소라; Hanja: 李蘇羅; born 1 September 1987) is a South Korean female professional volleyball player. She was part of the silver medal winning team at the 2010 Asian Games.
