= Sola Air Station =

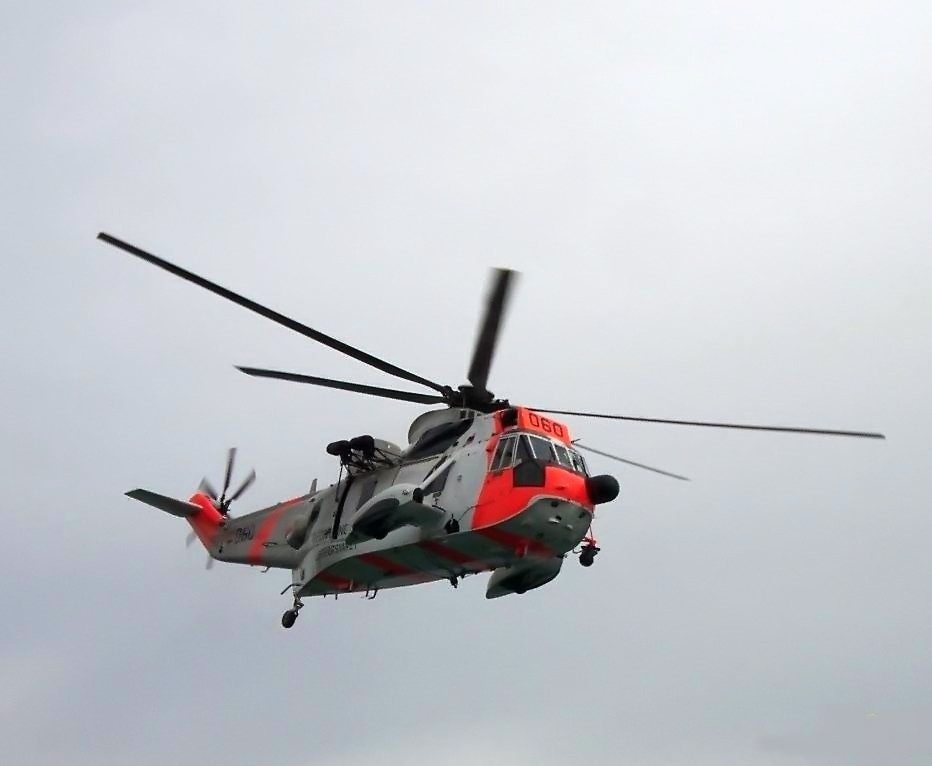
- A Westland Sea King helicopter operated by 330 Squadron at Sola Air Station
- IATA: SVG; ICAO: ENZV

Summary
- Airport type: Military/Public
- Operator: Royal Norwegian Air Force
- Location: Stavanger
- Elevation AMSL: 9 m / 29 ft
- Coordinates: 58°52′36″N 05°38′16″E

Map
- Location in Norway

Runways
Direction	Length		Surface
Direction	m	ft	Surface
18/36	2,856	9,369	Asphalt
11/29	2,449	8,035	Asphalt

Sola Air Station (IATA: SVG, ICAO: ENZV) (Norwegian: Sola flystasjon) is a base for the Royal Norwegian Air Force. It is located in Sola Municipality in Rogaland county, Norway. Rescue Helicopter Service is stationed at Sola along with Helicopter Squadron 330.

Also located at Sola is Stavanger Airport, Sola and an aviation museum. Near Sola, at Jåttå in Stavanger is NATO's Joint Warfare Center.

== Operations ==
The air station is the headquarters of the Rescue Helicopter Service with 330 Squadron who operates AgustaWestland AW101 SAR Queen search and rescue helicopters. The 12 helicopters are also detached to Rygge Air Station, Ørland Main Air Station, Bodø Main Air Station and Banak Air Station, with one helicopter on stand-by at any given time.

Other represented units from the Norwegian Armed Forces include the Home Guard, Norwegian Defence Logistics Organization, and Norwegian Cyber Defence Force.

== History ==
=== Opening ===
Sola Air Station was founded at May 29, 1937 by King Haakon VII, an air show with 42 aircraft marking the occasion. In 1939, it was decided to station military aircraft on the airfield (because of the tense situation unfolding in Europe at the time). August 5, 1939, the first Caproni Ca.310 bomber landed here.

=== Operation Weserübung ===
On April 9, 1940, in reaction to the German invasion of Norway, the bomber squadron was ordered to the east, but before they could take off, six German aircraft attacked. The bombers were damaged, only a few getting airborne to later be abandoned elsewhere and the airport was seized. Here, the first opposed landing by paratroopers took place as 132 German fallschirmjägers from 1st battalion of the 1st Regiment, 7th Flieger Division were dropped on the airfield. Around 3 fallschirmjägers became casualties as the air station's sole completed machine gun bunker fired on the attackers until being knocked out by a hand grenade, seriously wounding the gunner.

During the German occupation, the Luftwaffe used the facility's seaplane base for operations in support of Kriegsmarine ships based on the Norwegian coast. Embarked Air Squadron 1/196 made three partial deployments to the facility in 1940 and 1941 before the entire squadron was based there through April and May 1944, after which part of the squadron would remain until into July 1944.

8. Staffel III./Kampfgeschwader 76 equipped with Arado Ar 234s operated from the base during the final weeks of the war before surrendering to British forces.

=== Liberation and post-war ===
The next paratrooper landing at Sola took place May 9, 1945. This time, it was British and Norwegian troops that recaptured the airfield.

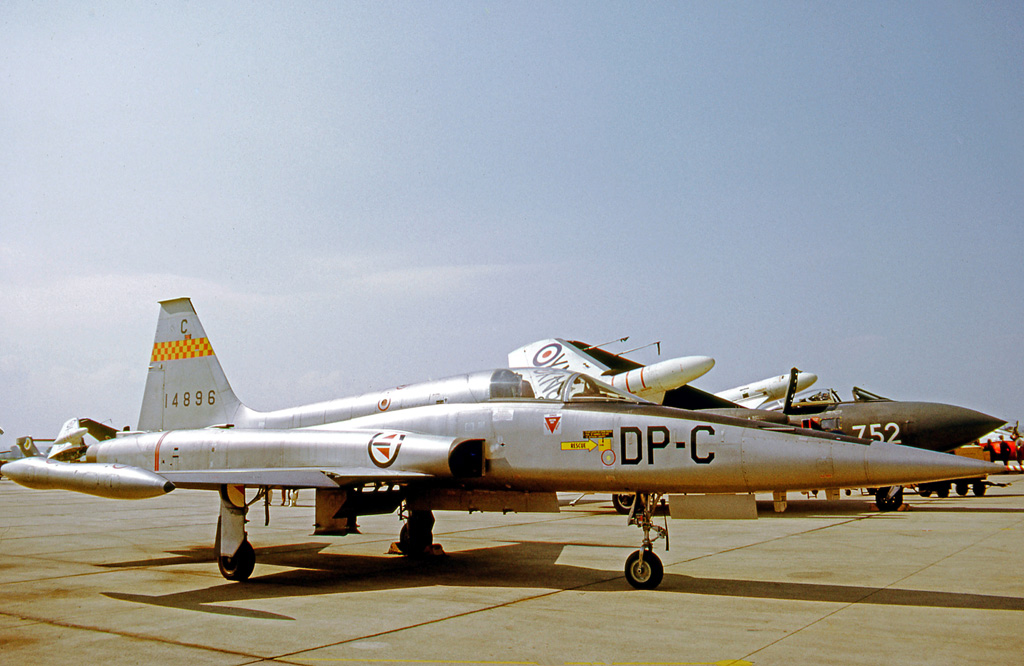
Northrop F-5A of 718 Squadron based at Sola in the early 1970s

330 Squadron was the first Norwegian squadron to land after the war. The squadron had been founded in Britain during the war and Sola was the first airfield to host Norwegian war-planes after the war. Squadron 330 was later disbanded, but the airfield remained as the biggest military airfield in the country up to the 1960s.

In early 1946, 333 Squadron came here, but it was moved to Tromsø during the Korean War. In 1953 it came back, but left for Andøya in 1963. 331 Squadron came in 1952. It was later disbanded and reformed until it moved to Bodø in 1955. 718 Squadron was formed here in 1952 and during the 1970s operated the Northrop F-5 fighter. The squadron remained until it was disbanded in 1982.

Sola Air Station has been considered to be closed, but will continue as a base for maritime helicopter operations.

=== NATO Use ===
The United States Air Force 426th Air Base Squadron provides support to 220 U.S. service members and their families working in support of NATO's Joint Warfare Center. The squadron also supports “Operating Location-A” in Oslo, Norway, shipping for $50 million war readiness material and $900 million U.S. Marine Corps and U.S. Navy equipment.
