= Widerøe (disambiguation) =

Widerøe is a Norwegian regional airline.

Widerøe may also refer to:

== People ==
- Rolf Widerøe (1902–1996), Norwegian accelerator physicist
- Turi Widerøe (born 1937), Norwegian aviator
- Viggo Widerøe (1904–2002), Norwegian aviator and founder of the airline

== Other ==
- Mount Widerøe, Antarctica
- Widerøe Polar, an aircraft
