= Aviation in Norway =

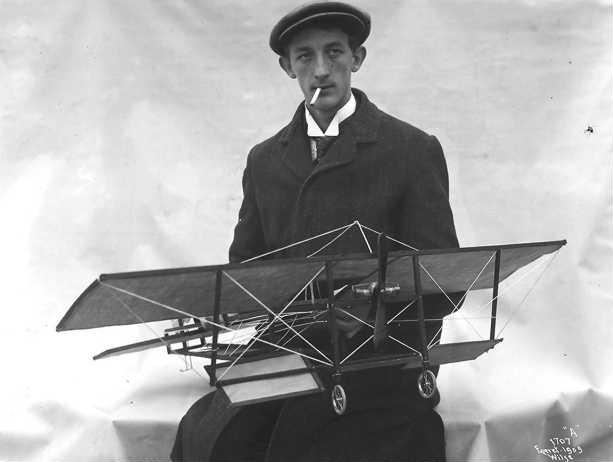
Einar Lilloe Gran with a scale model of his aircraft design in 1909.

Aviation has been a part of Norwegian society since the early twentieth century.

== Early attempts ==
In the early days of Norwegian aviation the Norwegian enthusiasts lacked an engine and were therefore unable to perform real flights. The first engine powered aircraft was ordered during the world's first air show in Reims and came to Kristiania in December 1909. It was purchased by Wilhelm Henie and was a Voisin biplane. The plane was however so damaged by a snowstorm that it would never fly.

In 1910 engineer Einar Lilloe Gran constructed the first motorised aircraft in Norway. It had a wing span of 10 meters and cost 12,000 kr to build. There were made several attempts to make the aircraft airborne, but without any significant results.

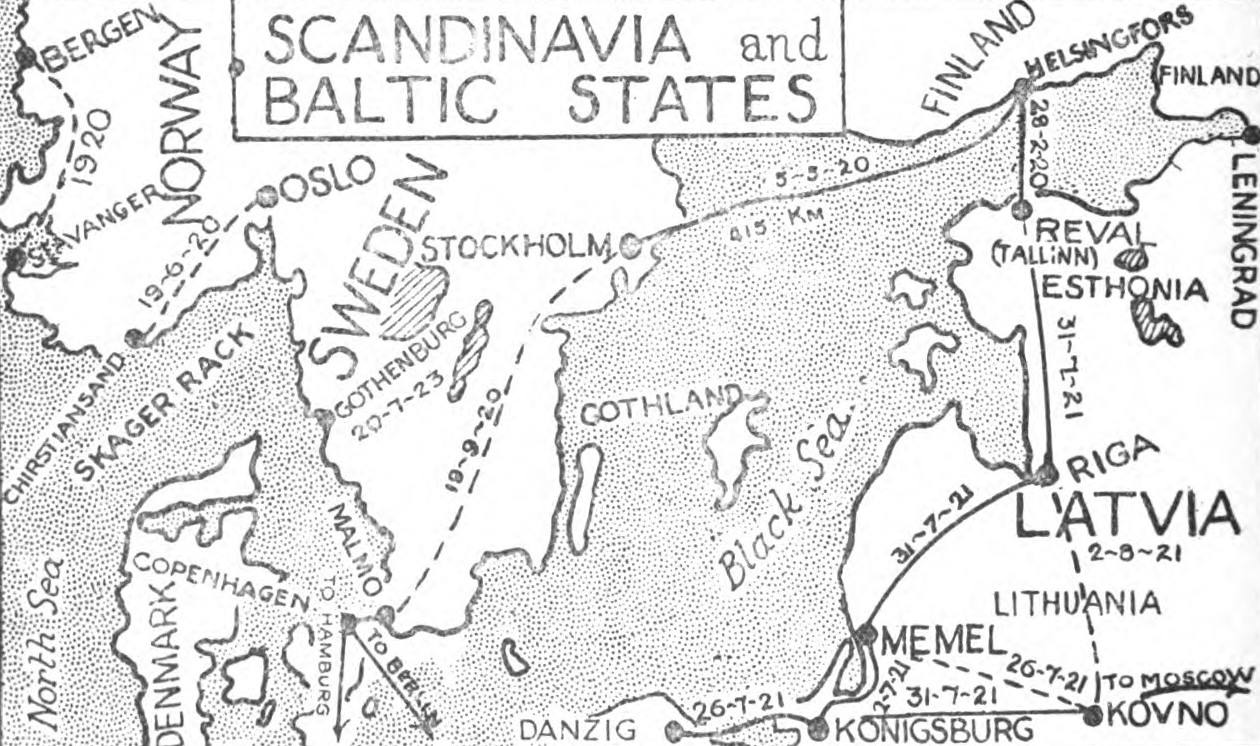
Commercial air routes in Scandinavia, and Norway, in 1925

Norwegian aviator Tryggve Gran (1889–1980) became a skilled pilot at Louis Blériot's aviation school in Paris, and on 30 July 1914, became the first pilot in history to cross the North Sea. He took off from Cruden Bay, Scotland, and landed about 4½ hours later at Jæren, Norway, flying a Blériot XI-2 monoplane.

The first confirmed flight was by the Swedish baron Carl Cederström on 14 October 1910. A 23-minute flight over Oslo with a top speed of 52 knots. The first motorized flight was made by Hans Dons in the HNoMS Start on 1 June 1912 from Horten to Øra close to Fredrikstad. Einar Sem-Jacobsen entered the first flight in a military mission at Elverum 1 September 1912 with Ganger Rolf, one of two Farman Longhorn that initiated the Army Air Forces the same year. Ganger Rolf and Njaal were both built in France and based at Kjeller airport - Norway oldest and one of the world oldest aerodromes.

Kjeller airport and Norwegian military airpower celebrated in 2012 100 years of flying in Norway with successful airshows at Kjevik (Kristiansand), Kjeller airport, Sola (Stavanger), Bodø, Andøya and the main impressive event in Oslo 1 September - along with several smaller events.

== Organized aviation ==
The public agency of civil aviation in Norway is Avinor. It was organized as a directorate from 1947, but this was preceded by an office organized under the Norwegian Ministry of Defence, created in 1920.

Widerøe (Widerøe's Flyveselskap) is among the older existing aviation companies in Norway, established in 1934. It had its roots in two smaller companies that were active in the early 1930s. Pioneers during this time include Viggo Widerøe, Halvor Bjørneby, Helge Skappel, Leiv Brun, Ditlef Smith and Erik Engnæs. Both Scandinavian Airlines System and Braathens were established in 1946. Braathens no longer exists, having been merged with SAS as SAS Braathens. A newer, large company is Norwegian Air Shuttle.

== Current ==
The main airport in Norway is Oslo Airport, Gardermoen. It replaced Oslo Airport, Fornebu, which was the main airport from 1 June 1939 to 7 October 1998.

The longest domestic non-stop flight is Scandinavian Airlines' Oslo-Longyearbyen service, well over 2000 kilometres.

SAS Scandinavian Airlines, based in Norway, Denmark and Sweden, has a network that reaches many countries across the world. Another major Norwegian airline is Norwegian Air Shuttle.
