= Hans Dons =

Norwegian navy officer (1882–1940)

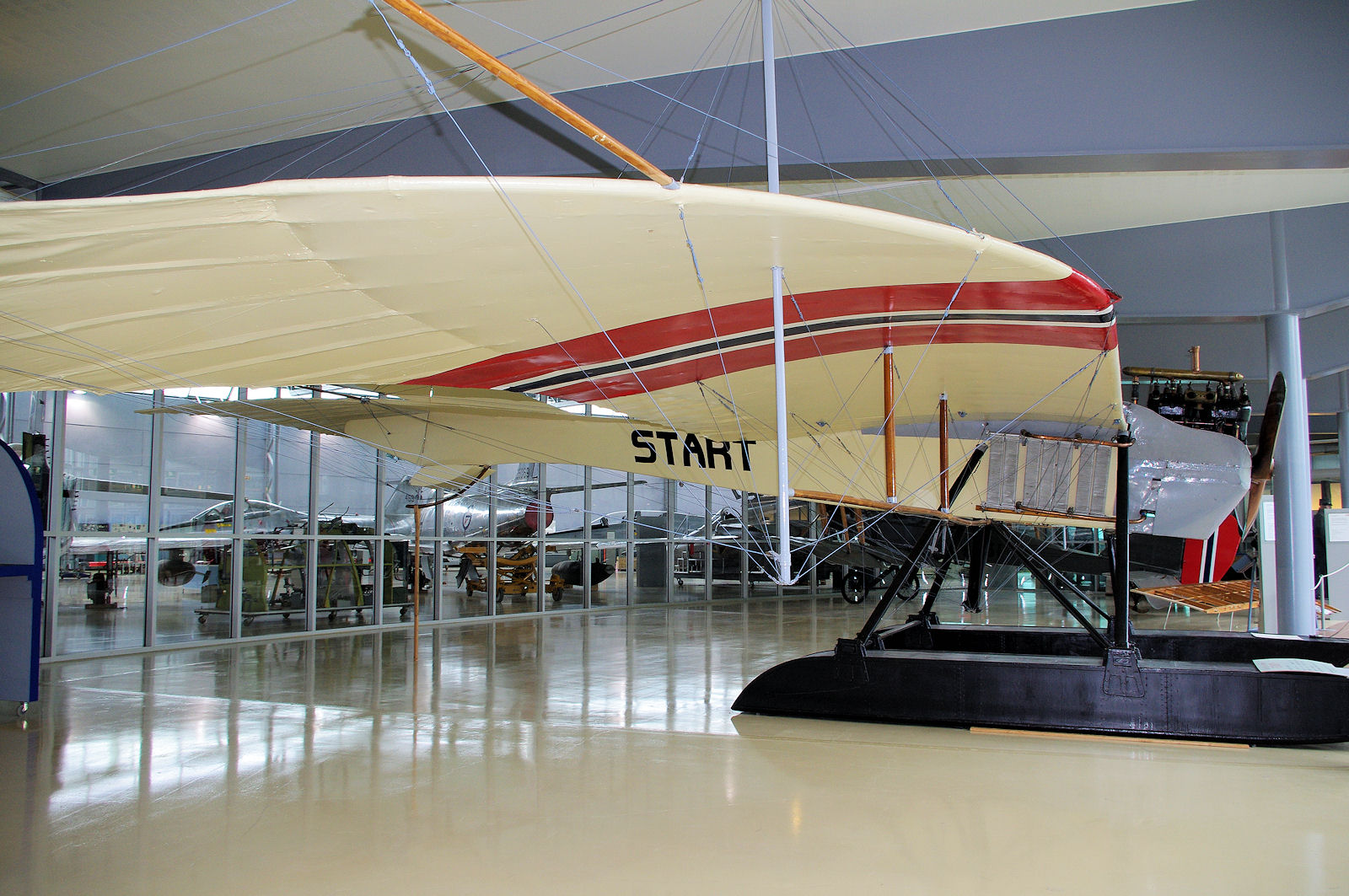
Start exhibited at Gardermoen

Hans Fleischer Dons (13 June 1882 – 28 October 1940) was a Royal Norwegian Navy officer. He is most associated with the first manned flight in Norway.

== Biography ==
Dons was born in Øvre Eiker, Norway. He was the son of Johannes Albrecht Dons (1839–1921) and Johanne Marie Fleischer (1850–1943). He attended the Royal Norwegian Naval Academy (1901–05) and Technische Hochschule Charlottenburg (1907–08). From 1909, he served in the Royal Norwegian Navy as second-in-command of Norway's first submarine, HNoMS Kobben. He was a naval attache at the Norwegian Legation in Washington, D.C. (1917–19) and held the same position in London and Paris (1927–30). Dons was the head of the submarine fleet and served on the Admiral Staff (1929–35).

On 1 June 1912 Dons piloted the first manned flight in Norway in a monoplane named Start. The fixed-wing aircraft was designed by Etrich Taube and was made in Germany by Edmund Rumpler. On 7 June, Dons flew from Borre over Horten, crossing Oslofjord to Moss and Fredrikstad – covering a distance of 48 kilometres (30 mi) in 35 minutes.

In 1935 Dons published his book Start: En norsk flyvehistorie fra 1912-13 (Oslo: Cammermeyers, 1935).

Start is on display at the Norwegian Armed Forces Aircraft Collection located at Gardermoen, north of Oslo, Norway.

== See also ==
- Aviation in Norway

== Related reading ==
- John Andreas Olsen (2014) European Air Power: Challenges and Opportunities (Potomac Books) ISBN 978-1612346816
