= Eva Harr =

Norwegian visual artist (1951–2024)

- Born: 10 March 1951; Harstad, Norway
- Died: 9 February 2024 (aged 72); Oslo, Norway
- Education: Norwegian National Academy of Craft and Art Industry; Norwegian National Academy of Fine Arts
- Occupation: Visual artist
- Relatives: Karl Erik Harr

Eva Harr (10 March 1951 – 9 February 2024) was a Norwegian visual artist.

== Life and career ==
Eva Harr was born in Harstad, Norway, on 10 March 1951, a daughter of Randi Heitmann and Karl Harr. She was a sister of Karl Erik Harr and Jan Harr.

Harr studied at the Norwegian National Academy of Craft and Art Industry from 1972 to 1977, and at the Norwegian National Academy of Fine Arts from 1977 to 1981, under Arne Malmedal and Guttorm Guttormsgaard.

Known for her landscape motives from Northern Norway, Harr is represented at the National Museum of Norway.

Harr died on 9 February 2024, of cancer, aged 72.
