= Kristian Østby =

Kristian Østby may refer to:

- Kristian Østby (aviator)
- Kristian Østby (ice hockey)
