= Northrop N-3PB Nomad =

American military floatplane by Northrop

N-3PB Nomad
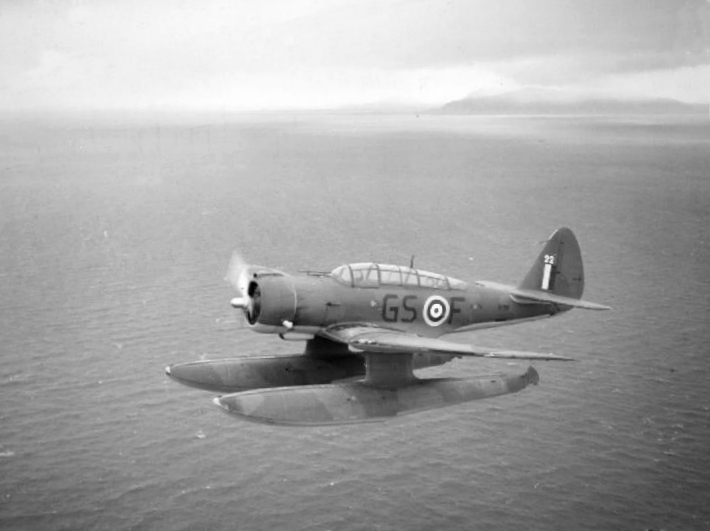
- Northrop N-3PB, 22 "GS-F", of No. 330 (Norwegian) Squadron based at Akureyri, Iceland, photographed in flight over the North Atlantic Ocean, October 1941.

General information
- Type: Patrol bomber/torpedo bomber floatplane
- Manufacturer: Northrop Aircraft Inc.
- Primary user: Royal Norwegian Navy Air Service
- Number built: 24

History
- Introduction date: 1941
- First flight: 22 December 1940
- Developed from: Northrop A-17

The Northrop N-3PB Nomad was a single-engined American floatplane of the 1940s. Northrop developed the N-3PB as an export model based on the earlier Northrop A-17 design. Twenty-four were purchased by Norway, but were not delivered until after the Fall of Norway during the Second World War. Exiled Norwegian forces used them from 1941, operating from Iceland, for convoy escort, antisubmarine patrols, and training purposes from "Little Norway" in Canada. Within two years of delivery, the design was obsolete for front-line service, and the remaining N-3PBs were replaced by larger aircraft in 1943.

== Design and development ==
Following increased international tension surrounding the German annexation of the Sudetenland in 1938, the Norwegian parliament granted extraordinary appropriations to modernize the Norwegian Armed Forces. The Royal Norwegian Navy Air Service (RNNAS) and the Norwegian Army Air Service were prioritized for funds from the 50,000,000 kr Norwegian Neutrality Fund. The RNNAS' share of the funds was reserved to buy 12 Heinkel He 115 torpedo bombers and 24 reconnaissance aircraft, as well as several new naval air stations. The Dornier Do 22, Northrop 8-A, Northrop 2GP, and Vultee V-11 GB were considered and proposals retrieved. The commission quickly decided the Vultee V-11 GB was the best aircraft to satisfy both air services' needs. On the part of the Royal Norwegian Air Service, the requirements were for a reconnaissance aircraft with a range of 1,500 km (930 mi), a top speed no less than 320 km/h (200 mph), and a capacity of a 900 kg (2,000 lb) torpedo or the equivalent in bombs.

On 30 December 1939, Norway sent a purchasing commission to the United States, consisting of a Royal Norwegian Navy Air Service contingent headed by Cmdr. Kristian Østby and a Norwegian Army Air Service contingent led by Birger Fredrik Motzfeldt. The goal of the commission was to inspect the Vultee V-11, which would serve as a new common reconnaissance bomber for the two air services. Amongst the requirements the commission hoped to fill was replacing the Royal Norwegian Navy Air Service's M.F.11 biplane patrol aircraft. Once in the US, the commission found that Vultee would not be able to deliver the V-11 within a reasonable amount of time, so another aircraft had to be found. Motzfeldt quickly found that the Douglas 8A-5N would satisfy the NOAAS' requirements. As the Douglas 8A-5N could not be fitted with floats, Østby continued to look for an aircraft suitable for the RNNAS. After visits to many of the aviation companies in February 1940, Østby determined that only one manufacturer had both a design and available production capacity, Northrop Aircraft Incorporated. The commission ordered 24 floatplanes based on the Model 8-A, renamed the N-3PB, "off the drawing board" (literally, the aircraft being ordered prior to the type having flown) from Northrop on 8 March 1940, at a total cost of 6,550,000 kr to meet this requirement. Half the amount was paid shortly before Operation Weserübung, the German invasion of Norway, on 9 April 1940.

The Model 8-A, the export model of the Northrop attack bomber series had to be redesigned to meet the requirements of the Norwegian order. The new N-3PB was the first product of Northrop Aircraft, which had reformed in 1939 and was a low-winged cantilever monoplane fitted with twin floats. (Note: Northrop's previous company had been taken over by Douglas in 1937.) First intended for a lower-powered engine, the N-3PB was ultimately powered by a Wright Cyclone radial engine, of the same type specified for the Douglas 8A-5N bombers and Curtiss Hawk 75A-8s ordered by Norway at the same time, simplifying the maintenance and operation requirements for the Norwegian military aircraft fleets.

With the Norwegian operation requirements drawn up for a coastal reconnaissance floatplane, a series of modifications was requested to the original design. The changes included a redesign of the float structure to accommodate either a torpedo or bomb load carried under the center fuselage to supplement five underwing bomb racks. Additional armament changes led to a combination of six machine guns replacing the four machine guns (two fixed forward, two flexible rear-mounted 7.9 mm)/one cannon (forward facing, fixed 20 mm) arrangement that was in the initial design. Provision for a rear under-fuselage gun was also made. Further equipment requirements including fitting a rear fuselage-mounted camera as well as changes to instruments and radio equipment.

Before Northrop could complete any aircraft, Norway was invaded by Germany. The invasion and occupation of Norway necessitated that the armament of the N-3PB, originally to be installed in Norway, had to be changed. Initial specifications listed one Oerlikon 20 mm cannon in each wing, as well as two 7.9 mm Fabrique Nationale machine guns each in the fuselage and rear gunner stations. Owing to the lack of availability of the originally specified armament, Norwegian-manufactured Colt heavy machine guns were substituted with four Colt MG53A .50 cal. machine guns in the wings and two .30 cal. Colt MG40s mounted in dorsal and ventral positions of the gunner's rear cockpit.

== Operational history ==
=== Delivery ===
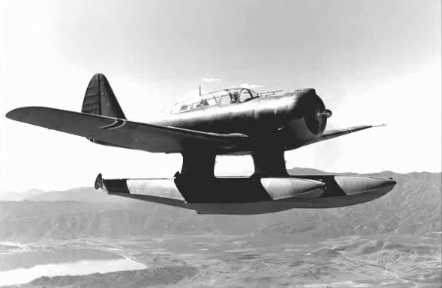
Northrop N-3PB carrying out a test flight over Lake Elsinore, California, c. 1940–1941

Northrop's Chief Test Pilot Vance Breese flew the first N-3PB (c/n 301) on 22 December 1940 from Lake Elsinore, California. The flight test and customer acceptance trials were completed using the first production aircraft. Due to the use of the more powerful Cyclone engine, all performance estimates were exceeded and flight characteristics including maneuverability were considered "excellent". All 24 aircraft were delivered to the exiled Royal Norwegian Navy Air Service by the end of March 1941.

=== Training ===
In late February 1941, six production N-3PBs were flown to Royal Canadian Air Force (RCAF) Station Patricia Bay, Vancouver Island, Canada, one of the Canadian winter bases of the Flyvåpnenes Treningsleir (FTL) Norwegian training bases known as "Little Norway". The N-3PB's service as an advanced trainer in Canada in the "Little Norway" summer base at Island Harbour, Toronto, and winter bases along the western coast of Canada, was relatively brief and ended when pilot and aircrew graduates were determined to be integrated into RAF squadrons. Arrangements were made later in 1941 for the advanced flight training of Norwegian pilots to be carried out in RAF and RCAF schools on types that better fit the transition to combat flying. The three surviving N-3PBs were stored until shipped to Iceland in March 1942 on the steamer Delta.

=== Combat use ===
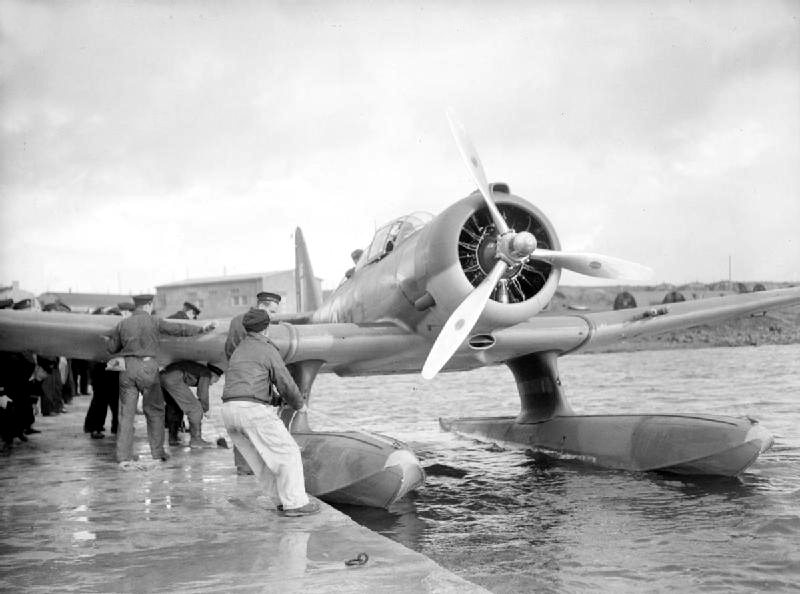
Northrop N-3PB of the Norwegian-manned No. 330(N) Squadron operated in Iceland, October 1941

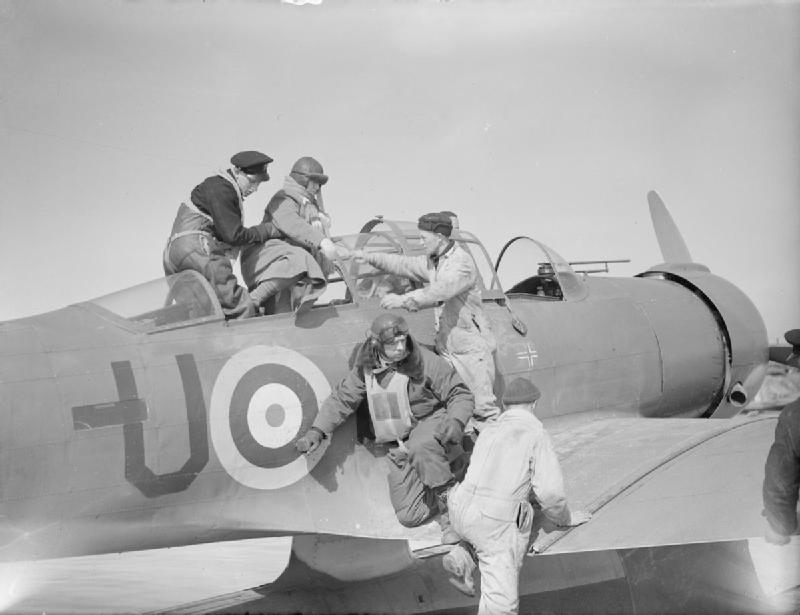
Northrop N-3PB from No. 330 (N) Squadron used to transport a seriously ill woman to hospital in Reykjavik in Iceland, May 1942

The remaining 18 N-3PBs were used to equip No. 330 (Norwegian) Squadron RAF in Reykjavík, Iceland. The N-3PBs sent to Iceland were all shipped across the Atlantic in crates on board the Norwegian steamer Fjordheim, with the voyage from New York City to Reykjavik taking 13 days to complete. Part of the reason for deploying the N-3PBs to Iceland was to avoid having the unusual aircraft operating over the United Kingdom, with the involved risk of friendly fire incidents. The exiled Norwegian military authorities had originally wanted to base the squadron in the United Kingdom to be able to operate off German-occupied Norway.

No. 330 (N) Squadron was declared operational on 25 April 1941; the N-3PBs were erected in a seaplane hangar at Reykjavik, with the first aircraft flying by 2 June 1941. The squadron flew antisubmarine and convoy patrols from 23 June 1941, with flights based at Reykjavík, Akureyri, and Búðareyri. While the squadron's N-3PBs carried out eight attacks on German U-boats, including one on U-570 after it had surrendered to the British, no U-boats were sunk. On a number of occasions in 1942, the N-3PBs clashed with Focke-Wulf Fw 200 long-range reconnaissance bombers and Blohm & Voss BV 138 flying boats, being credited with at least one damaged. On 10 October 1942, a "Northrop" from Búðareyri was involved in a friendly fire incident, attacking a British Lockheed Hudson. The incident ended without any of the aircraft involved being hit. (Note: The No. 330 (N) pilots and crews called their aircraft, "Northrops".)

To publicize the N-3PB operations, the British Air Ministry circulated a report that two Norwegian-flown aircraft had been involved in the attack on the German battleship Bismarck on 21–22 May 1941, but this was a lie. Despite many aviation historians disputing the claim, it still appears in current accounts of the sinking of the Bismarck. No. 330 (N) was formed on 25 April 1941 and received the first of 18 N-3PBs on 19 May, two days before the attack on the Bismark, but did not fly until 2 June 1941, and their first official operational sortie took place 23 June 1941. No. 330 (N) Squadron began supplementing the N-3PBs with Consolidated Catalina flying boats in 1942 and both the Catalina and the N-3PB began to be displaced in February 1943 by the arrival of the more capable Short Sunderland. Flying boats allowed for longer patrols to be carried out, and had superior seakeeping qualities to the N-3PB. The surviving N-3PBs continued to operate alongside the Catalinas, flying fighter patrol, escort, and antisubmarine operations off the east coast of Iceland until early 1943. Throughout the transition to other types, the squadron's C Flight maintained an "all-Northrop" unit, predominately involved in secondary roles, including army cooperation, transport, air-sea rescue, ice reconnaissance, and air ambulance. In early 1943, the crews of 330 (N) moved to Oban, Scotland, aboard the troop ship Leinster. Two of the remaining N-3PBs flew to Oban. The eight aircraft left behind in Iceland were scrapped in Reykjavik between December 1942 and April 1943.

Throughout its combat service from 23 June 1941 to 30 March 1943, No. 330 (N) Squadron carried out 1,1011 operational N-3PB sorties of 3,512 hours flying time. Although the eight attacks they carried out on U-boats proved inconclusive, N-3PB escort patrols and antisubmarine sweeps were an important part of the Allied effort in keeping the North Atlantic sea lanes open. After the end of the type's combat service in Iceland, the Norwegian naval authorities considered basing two N-3PBs on Svalbard, an Arctic archipelago previously known as Spitzbergen. Operation Zitronella, a German naval raid on 8 September 1943, resulted in the deployment being cancelled.

== Military operators ==
Norway

- Royal Norwegian Navy Air Service
  - No. 330(N) Squadron RAF
  - The Flyvåpnenes Treningsleir (FTL), "Little Norway" Training Unit

== Surviving aircraft ==
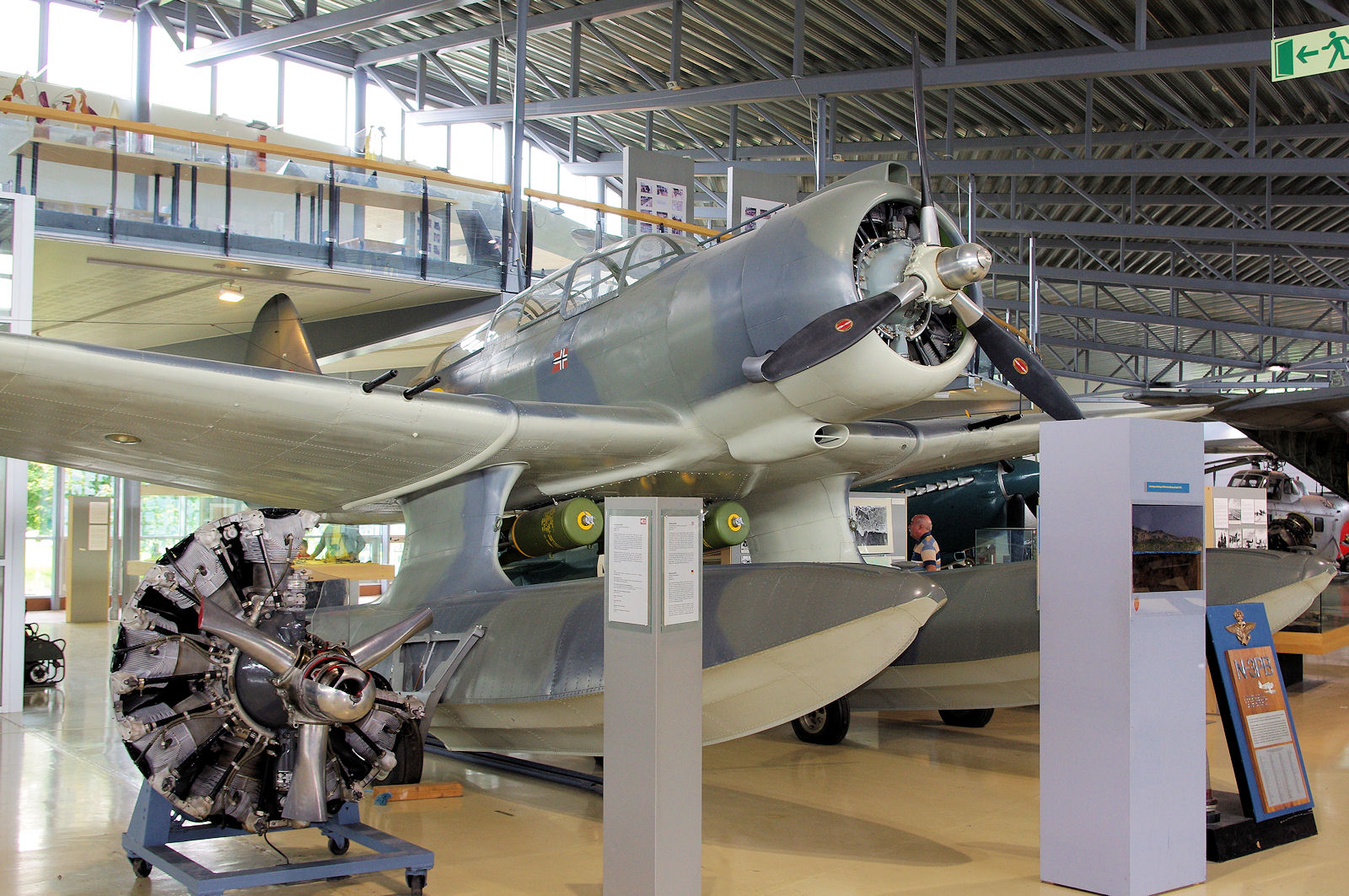
The restored N-3PB (c/n 320) displayed at the Norwegian Armed Forces Aircraft Collection

After the war, two surviving N-3PBs (c/n 306, 322) aircraft were flown to Norway, sold for salvage, with c/n 306 being scrapped in 1949 and c/n 322 scrapped in 1956.

After a search through records, Ragnar R. Ragnarsson, then-vice president of the Icelandic Aviation Historical Society, pinpointed the crash site of N-3PB (c/n 320 ["U"]). In 1979, the N-3PB wreck was recovered from the Þjórsá River in Iceland. Due to bad weather over Iceland's east coast, the N-3PB flown by Lt. W.W. Bulukin, operating from Búðareyri and transiting to Reykjavik, made a forced landing on 21 April 1943. After being stuck in the silt, it gradually sunk to the river's bottom.

US Navy divers began its initial recovery, later aided by a team of volunteer divers from Great Britain, Iceland, Norway, and the United States, bringing up the remains that were sent to the Northrop Aircraft Corporation in Hawthorne, California. Restoration was completed by a 300-strong volunteer group, including 14 retired ex-Northrop employees who had been involved in the original N-3PB production line. The complex restoration required the construction of replacement parts primarily by templating many damaged or corroded original aircraft components to create a complete airframe. In November 1980 the restored N-3PB was given to Norway by the Northrop Aircraft Corporation and the San Diego Aerospace Museum. This only surviving aircraft is currently on exhibition as part of Norwegian Armed Forces Aircraft Collection at Gardermoen, Norway.

On 27 August 2002, ICGV Baldur, while on a hydrographic surveying mission, discovered a relatively intact wreckage of a Northrop N-3PB lying upside down at the depth around 11 m (36 ft) in Skerjafjörður, close to Reykjavík. A diving ban was imposed in a 20-meter radius of the wreckage, as whether the plane was carrying any bombs, and with the cockpit being closed, the likelihood of it being a watery grave were unknown. Later evidence indicated that this was a N-3PB that crashed during landing on 22 October 1942 without the loss of life. In 2003, the National Archeology Department of Iceland issued conservation document in which the wreckage of the plane is declared protected.

== Specifications (N-3PB) ==
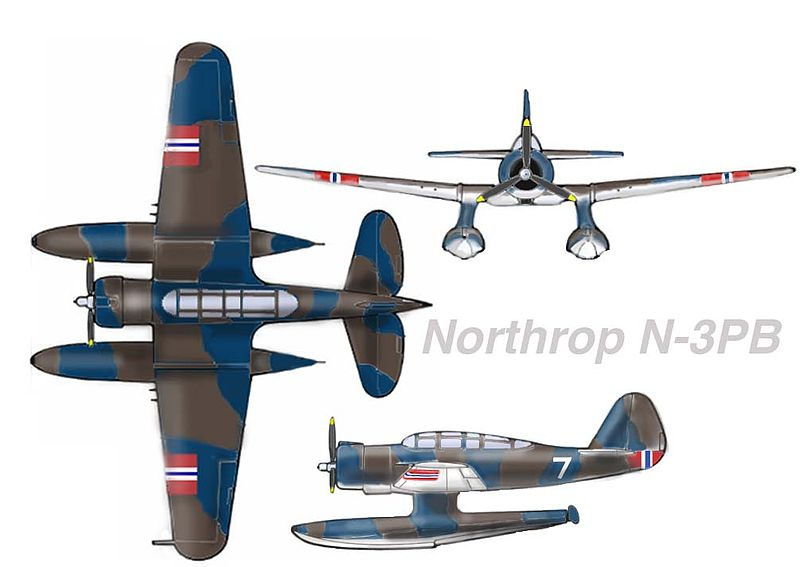
Northrop N-3PB in "Little Norway" colours, c. 1941

Data from War Planes of the Second World War: Volume Six Floatplanes, The Encyclopedia of Weapons of World War II

General characteristics

- Crew: Three (pilot, navigator/bombardier and wireless operator/rear gunner)
- Length: 36 ft (11 m)
- Wingspan: 48 ft 11 in (14.91 m)
- Height: 12 ft (3.7 m)
- Wing area: 376.8 sq ft (35.01 m^{2})
- Empty weight: 6,190 lb (2,808 kg)
- Gross weight: 8,500 lb (3,856 kg)
- Max takeoff weight: 10,600 lb (4,808 kg)
- Powerplant: 1 × Wright GR-1820-G205A 9-cyl. air-cooled radial piston engine, 1,200 hp (890 kW)
- Propellers: 3-bladed variable-pitch propeller

Performance

- Maximum speed: 257 mph (414 km/h, 223 kn) at sea level
- Cruise speed: 184 mph (296 km/h, 160 kn)
- Range: 1,000 mi (1,600 km, 870 nmi)
- Service ceiling: 24,000 ft (7,300 m)
- Time to altitude: 15,000 ft (4,600 m) in 4.4 minutes

Armament

- Guns: 4 × fixed forward firing 0.50 in (12.70 mm) machine guns
- 2 × 0.30 in (7.62 mm) machine guns in dorsal and ventral positions
- Bombs: 1 × 2,000 lb (910 kg) torpedo or equivalent weight of bombs or depth charges

== See also ==
Aircraft of comparable role, configuration, and era

- Aichi E13A
- Arado Ar 196
- Curtiss SC Seahawk
- Curtiss SO3C Seamew
- Fairey Seafox
- Fokker C.XI
- Latécoère 298
- Mitsubishi F1M
- Vought OS2U Kingfisher

Related lists

- List of aircraft of the Royal Air Force
- List of aircraft of World War II
- List of military aircraft of Norway
- List of flying boats and floatplanes
