= Muskoka Airport =

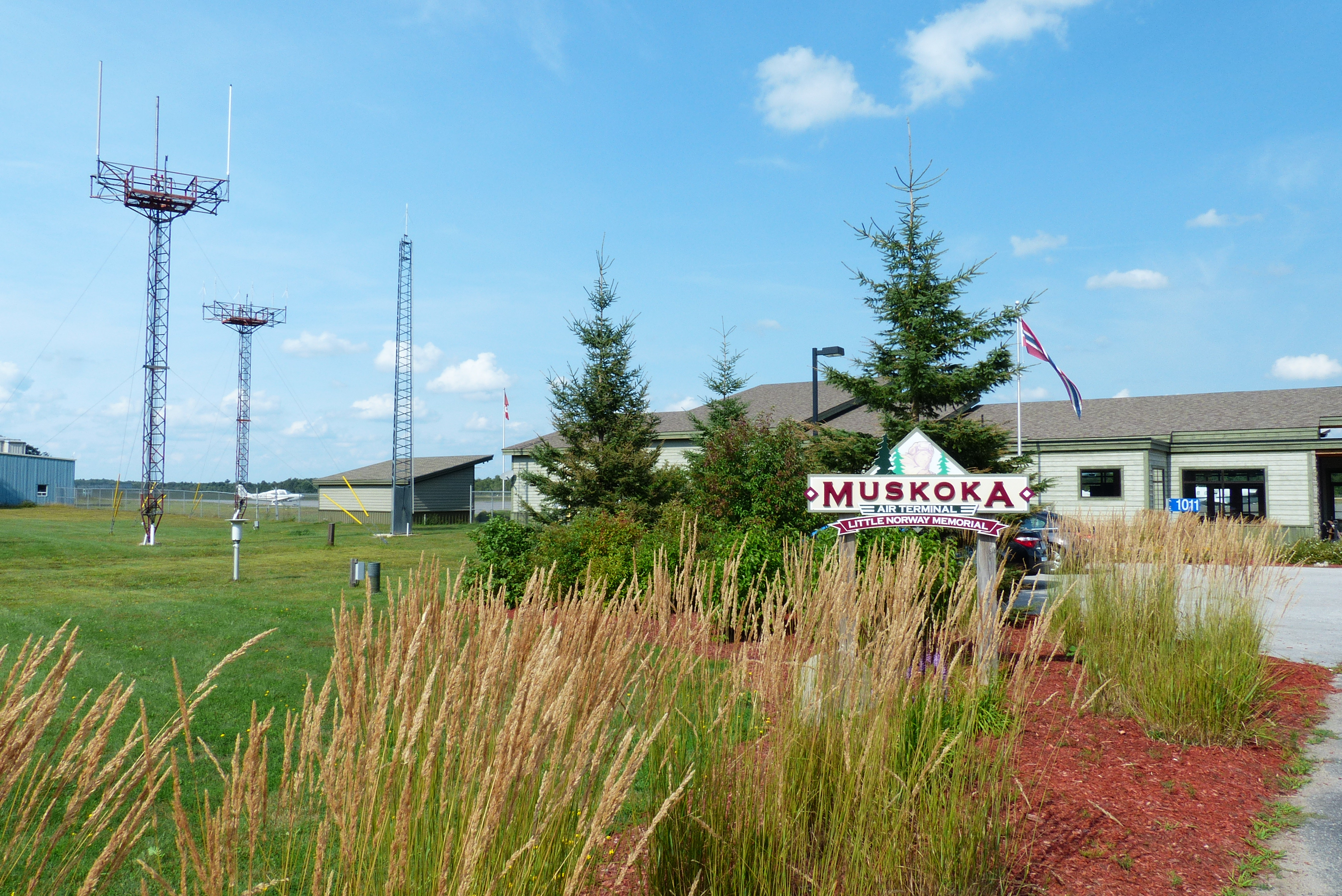
- IATA: YQA; ICAO: CYQA; WMO: 71630

Summary
- Airport type: Public
- Owner/Operator: District Municipality of Muskoka
- Serves: District Municipality of Muskoka
- Location: Gravenhurst, Ontario
- Opened: 1936
- Time zone: EST (UTC−05:00)
  - Summer (DST): EDT (UTC−04:00)
- Elevation AMSL: 918 ft (280 m)
- Coordinates: 44°58′35″N 079°18′24″W
- Website: www.muskoka.on.ca/en/airport/airport.aspx

Map
- Location in Ontario

Runways
| Direction | Length | | Surface |
| Direction | ft | m | Surface |
|---|---|---|---|
| 18/36 | 6,000 | 1,829 | Asphalt |

Statistics (2010)
- Aircraft movements: 16,417
- Source: Canada Flight Supplement; Environment Canada; Movements from Statistics Canada

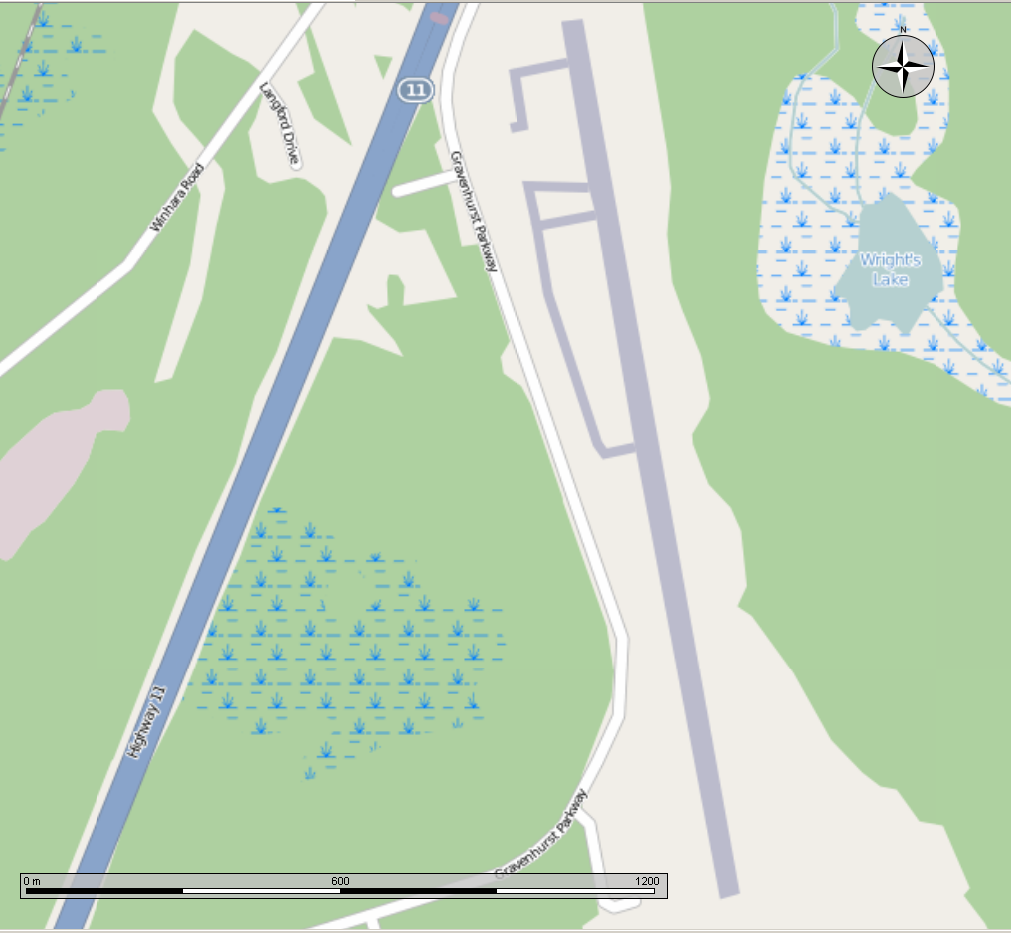
Map of the airport and runway

Muskoka Airport (IATA: YQA, ICAO: CYQA) is a small regional airport located in Gravenhurst,4 nautical miles (7.4 km; 4.6 mi) south of Bracebridge, Ontario, Canada. The airport is classified as an airport of entry by Nav Canada and is staffed by the Canada Border Services Agency (CBSA) on a call-out basis. CBSA officers at this airport can handle general aviation aircraft only, with no more than 15 passengers.

== History ==
The airport began construction in 1933 as part of the make-work project during the Great Depression. Staff were paid $1 plus keep per day to clear and level the landing strip. It was opened in 1936 as Reay Airport and renamed to the current name in 1938. From 1942 to end of World War II, it served as a training facility for the Royal Norwegian Air Force. Known as "Little Norway", it replaced the Toronto Island Airport as their main training base in Canada. The Royal Canadian Air Force (RCAF) used Muskoka Airport as an auxiliary airfield to CFB Borden during World War II.

Military use ended and ownership of the airport was transferred to Transport Canada. During the mid 20th century the airport was an emergency landing facility for Trans Canada Airlines and the RCAF. The airport has been owned by the District Municipality of Muskoka since 1996. A permanent memorial dedicated to the airport's contribution to Norway's air force was opened in 2007.

In 2019 and 2022, Porter Airlines operated scheduled summer seasonal flights from Billy Bishop Toronto City Airport but the service did not resume in 2023.

The airport is used by general aviation, charters and other operators:

- Royal Canadian Mounted Police
- Canadian Forces
- Ontario Ministry of Natural Resources

== Ground Transportation ==
=== Airline coaches ===
| Operator | Destinations |
|---|---|
| Air Canada (operated by Landline) | Toronto–Pearson |

Air Canada operates "land-air" motorcoach connection services between Muskoka Airport and Toronto Pearson International Airport, as they are deemed too close geographically for regularly scheduled flights to be operated economically. The service provides ticketed Air Canada and Star Alliance passengers with multiple daily non-stop ground connections between Muskoka Airport and Terminal 1 at Toronto Pearson.
