= Walter Rogowski =

German physicist

- Born: 7 May 1881; Obrighoven, German Empire
- Died: 10 March 1947 (aged 65); Aachen, Germany
- Education: RWTH Aachen University; Gdańsk University of Technology
- Known for: Rogowski coil Rogowski electrode
- Scientific career
- Fields: Applied physics, Electrical engineering
- Workplaces: RWTH Aachen University
- Doctoral students: Rolf Widerøe

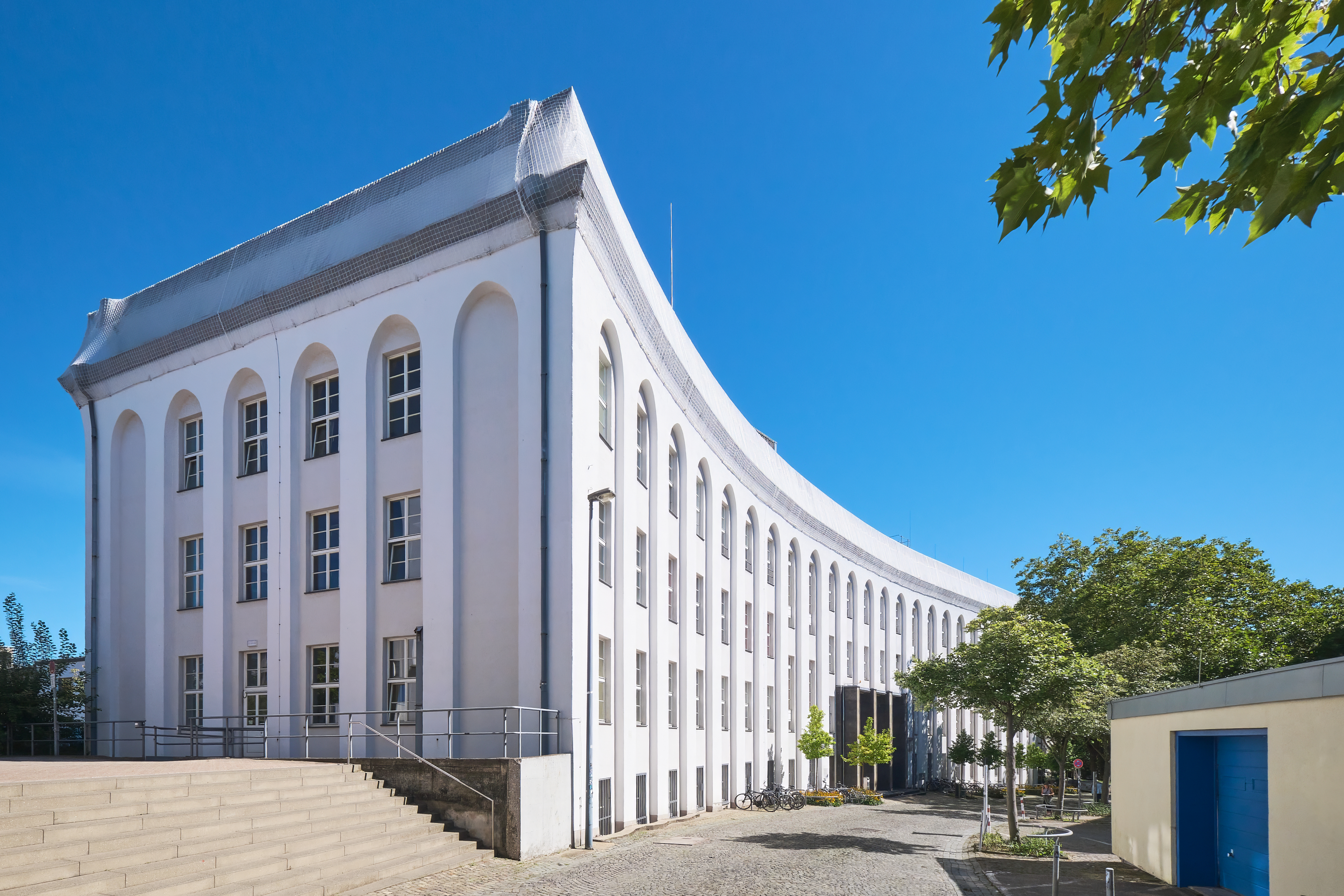
Rogowski-Institut der RWTH Aachen

Walter Rogowski (7 May 1881 – 10 March 1947) was a German physicist who bridged the gap between theoretical physics and applied technology in numerous areas of electronics. The Rogowski coil was named after him.

== Biography ==
In 1900, Rogowski began his studies at the RWTH Aachen, under Arnold Sommerfeld, who occupied the Chair for Applied Mechanics. He acquired his Vordiplom in 1902 and went on to study at the Danzig Technische Hochschule (now Gdańsk University of Technology), where he was also a scientific assistant. He completed his studies at Danzig in 1904, but stayed on until 1908, when he went to be a scientific assistant at the Physikalisch Technische Reichsanstalt in Berlin, specializing in high current technology, telecommunications technology, and electrical physics.

After World War I, Rogowski returned to Aachen, in 1920, and became an ordinarius professor for theoretical electro-technology and director of the Institute for Electro-Technology. At that time, the institute was in the mining industry building. Rogowski, with his head assistant Eugen Flegler, began to put together a plan for their own building. The draft submission to the Ministry of Education was made by the university in 1923. However, the plan was not accomplished until 1925, with inauguration of the generous institute building on 27 October 1929. The original plan proposed to house the entire electrical engineering section in the building. However, during the construction phase, it was decided the building would house only Rogowski’s Institute. The main thrust of the institute was to bridge the gap between physics and electro-technology. Work carried out in the institute included general electro-technology, theoretical electro-technology, telecommunications technology, high frequency engineering, electrical discharges in gases, and high voltage technology.

In 1927, the Norwegian Rolf Widerøe received his doctorate of engineering under Rogowski. Widerøe worked primarily on then-new oscillating-field particle accelerators and build the first linear particle accelerator at RWTH Aachen in 1928. It was his 1927 paper in Archiv für Elektrotechnik that Ernest Lawrence read in 1929, which gave him the idea for electrical resonance particle acceleration of protons, resulting in the cyclotron.

Ernst Sommerfeld, the son of Arnold Sommerfeld, worked with Rogowski at his institute.

The institute was renamed in Rogowski’s honor and became the Rogowski-Institut der RWTH Aachen.
