= Walter Mauderli =

American physicist

- Walter Mauderli
- Born: March 8, 1924
- Died: March 27, 2005 (aged 81)
- Education: Swiss Federal Institute of Technology
- Occupation: Medical physicist
- Years active: 1956-present
- Organization: American Association of Physicists in Medicine (AAPM)

Walter Mauderli DSc (March 8, 1924 – March 27, 2005) was a pioneer in the development of the field of medical physics. He earned his doctorate from the Swiss Federal Institute of Technology under the instruction of notable physicists as Nobel Laureate physicist Wolfgang Pauli.

== Career ==
Mauderli trained in the dosimetry of low- and high-energy radiations at the University of Zurich Medical Center with Professor Rolf Widerøe, the developer of particle accelerators. Mauderli moved to the United States in May 1956 and assumed a position at the University of Arkansas. In 1960 he became the first medical physicist at the University of Florida ("UF") and retired as Professor Emeritus in 1988. He was also academically affiliated with the Departments of Nuclear Engineering Sciences and Environmental Engineering Sciences. In the 1960s Mauderli was one of the founders of the medical physics graduate program at UF and radiologic technology training programs at two regional community colleges. He supervised many graduate students in their master's and doctoral research efforts.

Active in developing the use of computers in radiology, Mauderli performed fundamental research in electronic instrumentation in the fields of therapeutic radiology and nuclear medicine. He had 68 publications in his scientific career.

Mauderli was a founding member of the American Association of Physicists in Medicine (AAPM) and served on the initial board of directors with other leaders in the field.

== Awards and recognition ==
In order to recognize Mauderli's lifetime achievement in the field of medical physics in the state of Florida, in 2003 the Mauderli Award was created by the Florida Chapter of AAPM. This award bearing his name is given from time to time to a Florida medical physicist who is distinguished by significant scientific or clinical research, outstanding service as an educator in medical physics, or outstanding clinical service in medical physics.
