= Helge Skappel =

Norwegian aviator, photographer, and cartographer

Helge Sommerfelt Skappel
- Born: Helge Sommerfelt Skappel; 5 September 1907; Ringsaker Municipality, Hedmark, Norway
- Died: 17 October 2001 (aged 94); Nøtterøy Municipality, Vestfold, Norway
- Spouse: Gjertrud Lillian Nielsen
- Military career
- Allegiance: Norway
- Service: Norwegian Resistance
- Member: 1940-1945
- Awards: Defence Medal 1940–1945; King's Medal of Merit

Helge Sommerfelt Skappel (5 September 1907 – 17 October 2001) was a Norwegian aviator, photographer and cartographer. He was among the early aviation company owners in Norway, and later became known as a photographer in Widerøe from 1934 to 1975, except for four years during World War II when he was imprisoned in concentration camps for resistance work. He pioneered the use of aerophotogrammetry in Norway.

== Pre-war life ==
He was born in Ringsaker Municipality as a son of banker Halvdan Skappel and Dagny Sommerfelt Skappel. He took a pilot's education from 1929 to 1930 under the Norwegian Army at Kjeller. Skappel soon became involved in the pioneer days of aviation in Norway. He owned the company Lotsberg & Skappel, along with Leiv Brun, Ditlef Smith and Erik Engnæs. The company operated a Gipsy Moth airplane. It was used for private flights, taxi flights and air shows, the latter in cooperation with the company Widerøe & Bjørneby as well as Norsk Aero Klubb. Widerøe & Bjørneby became Widerøe's Flyveselskap in February 1934, after Viggo Widerøe had bought and flown a Waco Cabin from the United States. In the Easter of 1934, a meeting was held at Ustaoset in which Skappel was recruited to Widerøe's Flyveselskap—his company would become incorporated into Widerøe's, and the co-owners be involved as well. Skappel was to lead the aerial school as well as a department for aerial photography. Incidentally, the Standard Moth plane owned by Skappel crashed shortly after, leading him to believe that he had lost his "entrance ticket" to Widerøe's, but he still became director of photography in the company. From 1935 he pioneered the use of aerophotogrammetry. Among others, the company had a contract with the Norwegian Mapping and Cadastre Authority (then known as Norges Geografiske Oppmåling).

== World War II ==
During World War II, Norway was invaded by Germany on 9 April 1940. Helge Skappel's brother died in the Battle of Stryken already on 12 April. Skappel joined the resistance movement, helping Norwegians to flee the country. He also transmitted information about German troop movements via illegal radio. He was arrested for conducting "intelligence" in June 1941, and was imprisoned at Møllergata 19 for a month. He was sentenced to six years of prison. He was transferred to Grini concentration camp in July 1941, as #353 of almost 20,000 prisoners. Viggo Widerøe was imprisoned as well, and they spent prison time in Åkebergveien from October to November 1941, before being shipped to Germany via Akershus Fortress. He was imprisoned at Hamburg-Fühlsbuttel, and remained so until being saved by the White Buses at the war's end.

His brother Vilhelm Skappel (1911–1992) was also a part of the resistance movement, but he fled to England in 1943. Like Helge, he worked with aerial photography, having started as early as 1930. After the war, Vilhelm Skappel chaired Commission VII of the International Society for Photogrammetry and Remote Sensing for ten years.

== Post-war life ==
Skappel continued in Widerøe after the war. In 1946, he released the book Pionertid, "Pioneer Time", together with Viggo Widerøe, chronicling their time as pioneers of aviation in Norway. In 1951-1952 he was a member of an aerial expedition to Antarctica, as a part of the larger Norwegian-British-Swedish Antarctic Expedition. The small mountain Skappelnabben was discovered and named after him. In 1953 he made an advance to launch a program for economic mapping. This was his second advance; a proposal in 1937 led to some work being done by a committee, but it was hampered by World War II. Skappel's second advance led to a committee being formed in 1957, and economic mapping was eventually started by Norges Geografiske Oppmåling, however as late as in 1964. Skappel retired from the professional life in 1975.

Skappel was decorated with the Defence Medal 1940–1945 and the HM The King's Medal of Merit, and was an honorary member of the national cartographic society. He lived in Nøtterøy in his later life, and died in October 2001, aged 94.
