= HNoMS Start =

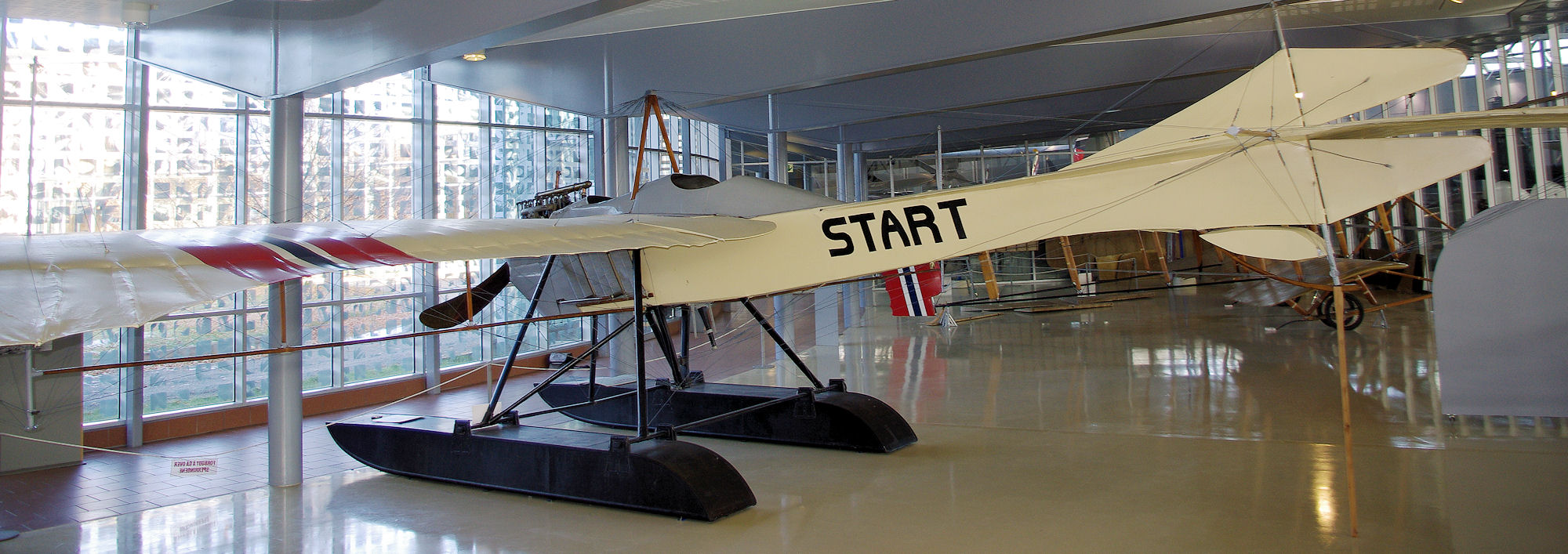
- Start on display at Forsvarets Flysamling

General information
- Type: Rumpler Taube floatplane
- Manufacturer: Rumpler Flugzeugwerke

History
- Manufactured: 1912
- First flight: 1 June 1912
- In service: 1912-?
- Preserved at: Displayed at the Norwegian Armed Forces Aircraft Collection
- Fate: preserved

The Taube was first constructed in 1909-1910 by Austrian Igo Etrich and later developed into a two-seater military aircraft in 1912. Many Taubes were built under licence by a wide array of manufacturers but most were produced by the Rumpler Flugzeugwerke. By 1912 the design had evolved to a 2-seater reconnaissance aircraft for military use

Built by Rumpler as a 2-seat Taube floatplane, Start was the Royal Norwegian Navy's very first aeroplane, bought in Germany and arriving in Horten on 25 May 1912, at a cost of 30,000 Norwegian kroner. Funding came from private contributions after a speedy initiative from the commander and officers of the submarine HNoMS Kobben, Norway's first submarine; one of the largest contributors was H.M. King Haakon VII of Norway.

The first flight was made on 1 June 1912 by Secondløytnant Hans Fleischer Dons (who was also second in command on the submarine HNoMS Kobben). He took off from Gannestad in Borre Municipality, flew over Karljohansvern naval station and Moss before landing in Øra, not far from Fredrikstad. The flight was 48 kilometres (30 mi) long and took 35 minutes. Dons was congratulated by both the King and the Government of Norway.

Start was officially given as a gift to the navy on 1 August 1912 and is today displayed at the Norwegian Armed Forces Aircraft Collection.

== Operators ==
Norway

- Royal Norwegian Navy Air Service

== Specifications (Rumpler Taube) ==
Data from

General characteristics

- Crew: 2
- Length: 9.9 m (32 ft 6 in)
- Wingspan: 14.3 m (46 ft 11 in)
- Height: 3.2 m (10 ft 6 in)
- Wing area: 32.5 m^{2} (350 sq ft)
- Empty weight: 650 kg (1,433 lb)
- Gross weight: 850 kg (1,874 lb)
- Powerplant: 1 × Mercedes Typ E4F 4-cyl. water-cooled piston engine, 64 kW (86 hp)

Performance

- Maximum speed: 100 km/h (62 mph, 54 kn)
- Range: 140 km (87 mi, 76 nmi)
- Service ceiling: 2,000 m (6,600 ft)

Armament

- Guns: Rifles and pistols
- Bombs: Hand dropped bombs
