= Einar Lilloe Gran =

Norwegian engineer and aviator

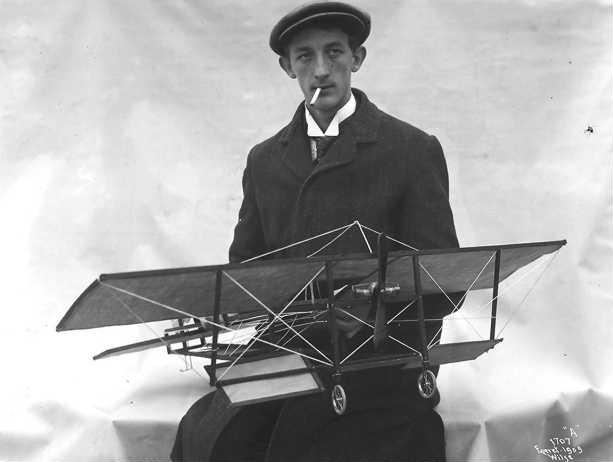
Gran in 1909 with a scale model of his aeroplane

Einar Lilloe Gran (16 November 1886 – 1966) was a Norwegian engineer and pioneer of aviation in Norway. He was a son of Carl Ludvig Oscar Nielsen Gran (1855–1897) and his wife Emma Sofie Christine (née Halvorsen; born 1857 in Sandaker).

Gran designed and built the first Norwegian motorized aeroplane in 1910. It had a wingspan of 10 meters and cost 12,000 kr. Gran made several attempts to make the aircraft airborne, but without any significant success.
