= Turi Widerøe =

Norwegian aviator

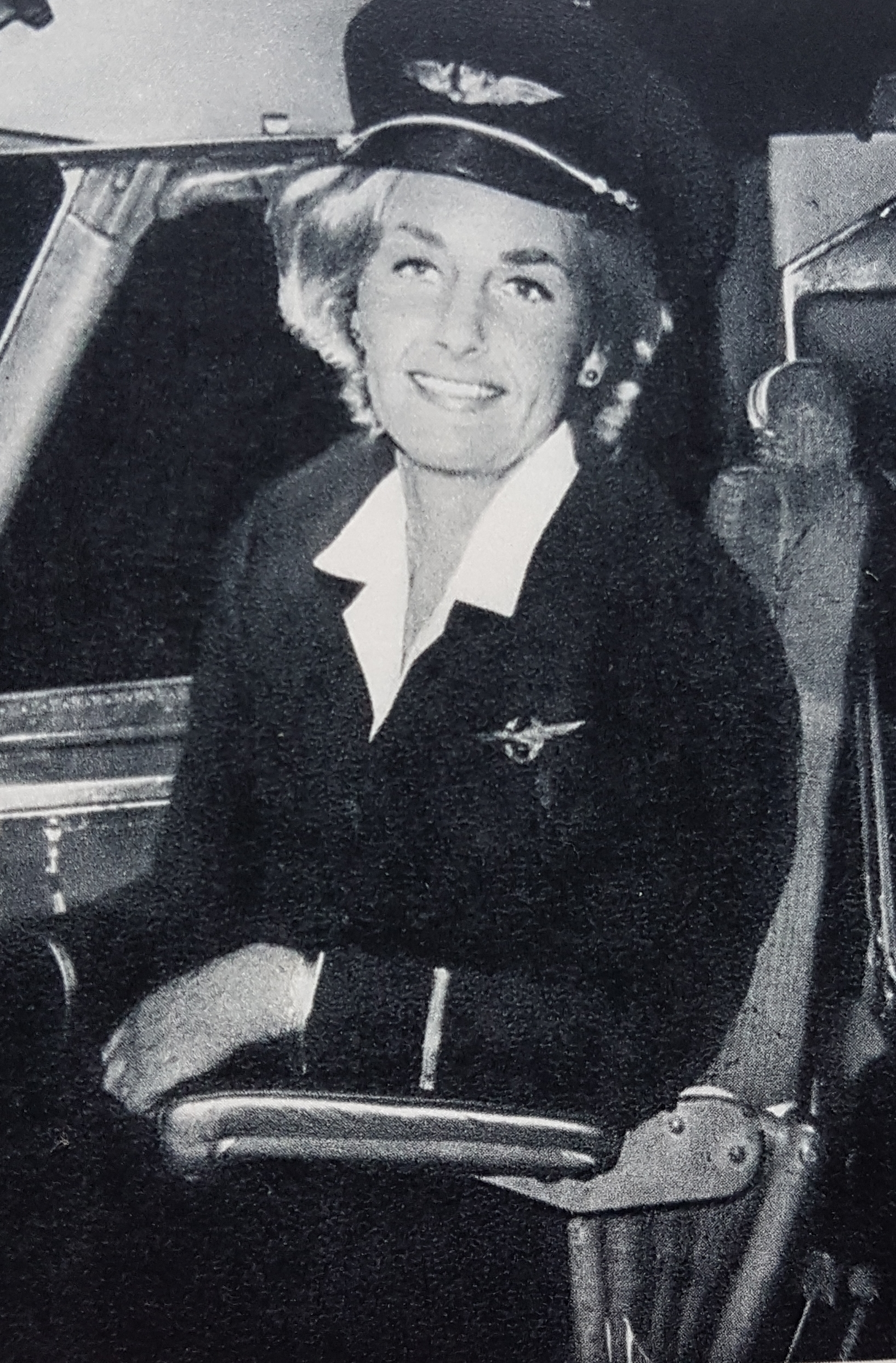
- Widerøe at an unknown date
- Born: November 23, 1937 (age 88); Oslo, Norway
- Known for: Norway's first female air transport pilot
- Spouse: Karl Erik Harr (m. 1972; div. 1975)
- Relatives: Viggo Widerøe (father); Solveig Agnes Schrøder (mother); Rolf Widerøe (uncle)

Turi Widerøe (born 23 November 1937) is a Norwegian aviator who was the world's first female commercial air pilot for a major airline. The daughter of aviator Viggo Widerøe (who founded the airline Widerøe), she was originally educated as a book designer. She later undertook pilot training, and, employed by Scandinavian Airlines System, became the first female pilot in a major airline in the Western world. After ending her flight career she worked for numerous cultural institutions such as the Norwegian Broadcasting Corporation, Gyldendal, Oslo Nye Teater and Riksteatret.

== Personal life ==
She was born in Oslo, the daughter of Viggo Widerøe (1904–2002) and Solveig Agnes Schrøder (1914–1989). Her father was a noted aviator who founded Widerøe's Flyveselskap A/S, a regional airline in Norway, in 1934. She was also a niece of noted accelerator physicist and engineer Rolf Widerøe.

== Career ==
In 1958 she graduated as a book designer from the Norwegian National Academy of Arts and Crafts, following a four-year education. In the same year she was awarded for her design of Solveig Christov's book Valgets brodd. She worked two years for the printing presses Grøndahl & Søn and Aksjetrykkeriet, and from 1960 to 1964 she was assistant editor for National Association of Norwegian Architects's magazine Byggekunst.

She received her private pilot's license in 1962. After working in ore research for the mining company A/S Sydvaranger in Inner Troms, she acquired her commercial license in 1965. She flew Noorduyn Norseman and de Havilland Otter seaplanes and later Twin Otters on scheduled routes and mercy flights for Widerøe's Flyveselskap north of the Arctic Circle.

In 1968, she was employed by SAS (Scandinavian Airlines System). After graduating from the company's Flight Academy in 1969, she was certified as a co-pilot on the Convair 440 Metropolitan, and became the first female pilot in a major airline in the western world. She also flew SAS' first jet aircraft, the Caravelle, and the DC-9 before she ended her flying career.

In 1974 she wrote a 40th anniversary history of Widerøe's Flyveselskap, published as two articles in the Norwegian Airline Pilots Association's magazine Cockpit Forum. She had taken the initiative to Cockpit Forum's predecessor magazine Interno.

In 1979, following the end of her flying career, she was given a fellowship in the Norwegian Broadcasting Corporation. She worked as a journalist and presenter there from 1980 to 1986, and from 1986 to 1988 she was an editor in Gyldendal Norsk Forlag, one of the largest publishing houses in Norway. She was information director in Norsk forbund for fjernundervisning for several years, and around 2000 she worked with public information for Oslo Nye Teater and Riksteatret.

In 2006 she took a master's degree in history at the University of Tromsø. Her thesis, Is fly og skip ("Ice planes and ships"), deals with airborne and geophysical mapping of the Antarctic continent between 1929 and 1939.

== Awards and legacy ==
Her first uniform is displayed in the National Air and Space Museum in Washington, D.C. In 1970, she was awarded the Harmon Aviatrix Trophy and the Amelia Earhart Medal by the Ninety-Nines. She received the FAI Paul Tissandier Diploma in Paris in 2005, on the 100th anniversary of the aviation organization.

Widerøe is briefly referenced in U.S. aviation writer Robert Serling's 1971 novel She'll Never Get Off the Ground.

SAS releases a short movie in December 2024 celebrating her career as the first female commercial pilot.
