= Karl Erik Harr =

Norwegian artist (born 1940)

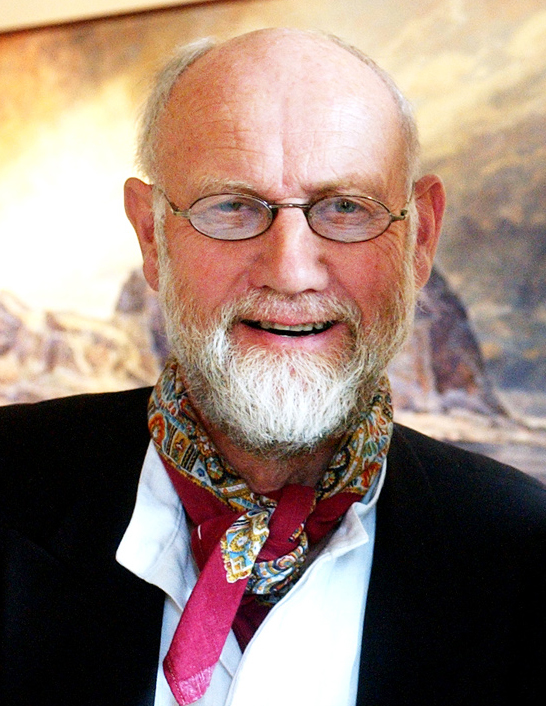
Karl Erik Harr.

Karl Erik Harr (born 8 May 1940) is a Norwegian painter, illustrator, graphic artist and author, best known for his representations of Northern-Norwegian scenery and coastal history. From 1972 to 1975, Erik was married to Turi Widerøe, the first female pilot for a major airline in the western world.

== Background ==
Harr was born in Kvæfjord Municipality in Troms and studied at the Oslo National Academy of the Arts. He is the brother of Eva Harr and Jan Harr.

== Career ==
Since his debut at Statens kunstutstilling during 1967, his works have been presented at numerous exclusive and collective exhibitions. Harr has illustrated the works of Knut Hamsun. He designed the indoor decorations for the Hurtigruten Coastal Express steamship Richard With.

He was awarded the knighthood of the first class of the St. Olavs order in 2001 by his majesty the king of Norway for outstanding work towards the arts in Norway.

== Selected works ==
- 1973 Ytterst i verden
- 1974 Skarvene på Ut-Røst
- 1975 Nord i fjæra
- 1978 Nattlys
- 1982 Morran Nordpå
- 1983 Porten ved havet
- 1986 Sirilund
- 1988 Guds Nordenvind
- 1992 Der trollbåra bryt
- 1993 Den vakreste reisen
- 1994 Der skræg en fugl
- 1995 Malerier
- 1997 Fablenes farkost
- 1997 Draumkvædet
- 1999 Nordlandsbåten
- 2001 Dragsug
- 2001 Kunsten ombord
- 2001 Malerier av (paintings)
- 2003 Vals i Concarneau
- 2003 Rotur i evigheten
- 2004 Hamsuns Nordland
- 2005 Morgen ved havet
