= Little Norway =

Military training camp in Canada

Coordinates: 43°38′05.9″N 79°23′57.0″W

- Toronto Island Airport, later Muskoka Airport
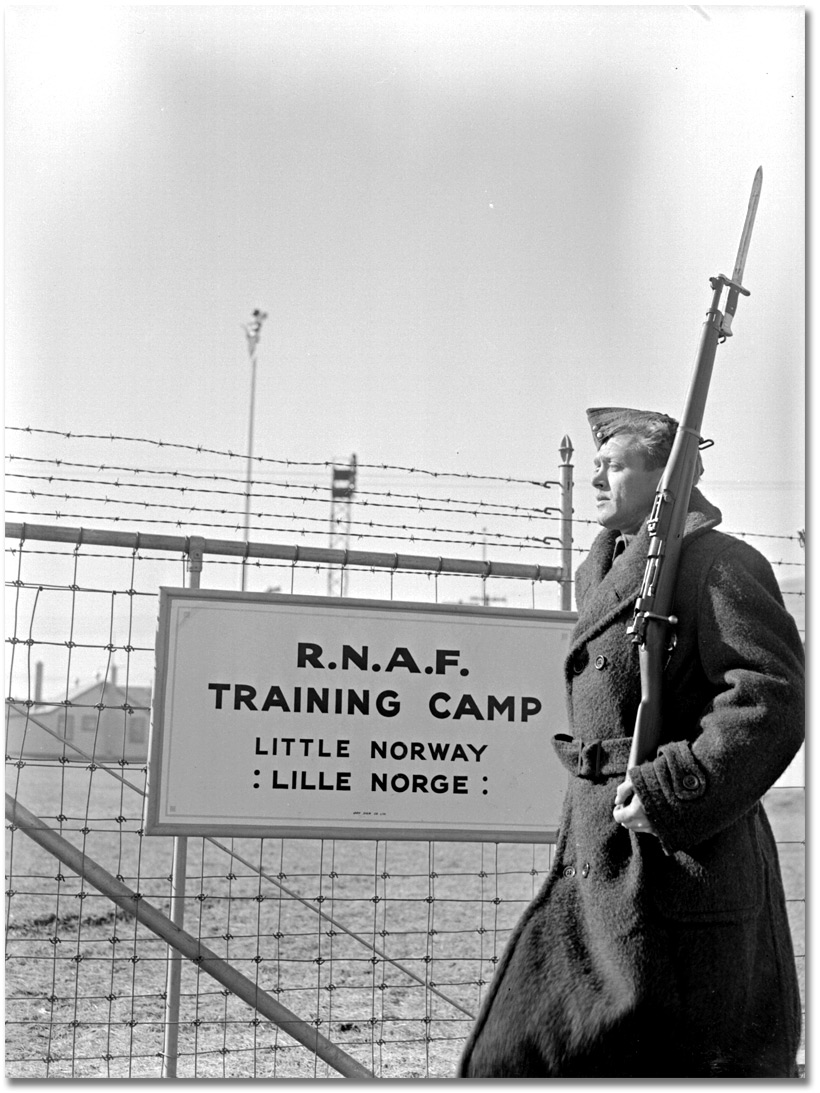
- A Norwegian guard at the camp gate in November 1940.

Site information
- Type: Air Force training camp
- Controlled by: Norwegian Army Air Service / Royal Norwegian Air Force

Site history
- Built: 1940
- In use: November 1940 – February 1945

Garrison information
- Past commanders: Maj. Gen. Hjalmar Riiser-Larsen (Nov. 1940-New Year 1941); Major Ole Reistad (1941–1945)

Little Norway (Norwegian: Lille Norge), officially Flyvåpnenets Treningsleir (FTL, "Air Force Training Camp"), was a Norwegian Army Air Service/Royal Norwegian Air Force training camp in southern Ontario during the Second World War.

== Origins ==
When Nazi Germany attacked Norway on 9 April 1940, with only a small number of modern aircraft, the Norwegian Army Air Service and Royal Norwegian Navy Air Service were unable to mount a sustained defence. Following the defeat of the Norwegian forces, the King, key members of the government and military left Norway in June 1940 aboard HMS Devonshire.

After arriving in England, the Norwegian government-in-exile began the process of setting up a new base of operations. A decision was swiftly made to keep the existing Norwegian pilots that had escaped to the United Kingdom as an independent unit. Consequently, none were allowed to participate in the Battle of Britain. Arrangements were made to transfer Norwegian pilots to a North American headquarters. Various locations were considered, and a base around the Toronto Island Airport in Toronto was chosen. Once the base was established, young Norwegians migrated to the site to enroll in the Royal Norwegian Air Forces (RNAF).

In 1939, Bernt Balchen, a Norwegian aviator enlisted with the Royal Norwegian Navy Air Service, made his way to the United States on a crucial mission to negotiate "matters pertaining to aircraft ordnance and ammunition with the question of the Norwegian Government's possible purchase of such materials in the United States of America." With his status of holding dual Norwegian and U.S. citizenship and his extensive contacts in the aviation industry, his instruction from the Norwegian Government-in-exile in London changed to a new directive: to set up a training camp and school for expatriate Norwegian airmen and soldiers in Canada. Balchen negotiated directly with Canadian government officials to obtain an agreement to use available airport facilities at the Port George VI Island Airport in the Toronto Islands on Lake Ontario.

== Training ==
After construction of new facilities had started, other Norwegian military staff took over with Col. Oscar Klingenberg chosen to head the training schools and Georg Unger Vetlesen and Thor Solberg able to deal with US aircraft manufacturers handling the procurement orders for military equipment. The greatest need revolved around the requirement for more combat pilots, necessitating placing orders in summer 1940 for 36 Fairchild PT-19s as a basic training aircraft. The first of the order began to arrive on 23 November 1940, being ferried in by American pilots. The initial batch of 10 PT-19s were supplemented by 26 PT-19As with a more powerful Ranger engine fitted. All of the series were retro-fitted in 1941 with canopies, converting the trainers into a PT-26 standard. Other operational aircraft, 24 Northrop N-3PBs and 35 Curtiss Hawk 75-A8s already on order (only five of the original order of 19 P-36s were undelivered, and were sent to Canada along with a further order for 36 new aircraft) were utilized as advanced trainers. Air defence forces were divided between Army and Naval Air Corps, with both services retaining their own commanding officers. The "Little Norway" camp was officially opened on 10 November 1940, located in the bay area of Toronto, on the shores of Lake Ontario. Its first commander was Hjalmar Riiser-Larsen. Major Ole Reistad took over early 1941.

The earliest considerations for Norwegian pilots were to have a separate air force operating out of England, but by late 1940, the Norwegian government-in-exile mandated that all the "Little Norway" student pilots were ultimately destined for Norwegian-staffed RAF squadrons. Although basic training took place in "Little Norway", by 1941, students selected as fighter pilots began to receive advance training at the British Commonwealth Air Training Plan base in Moose Jaw, Saskatchewan on the NA Harvard. In 1943, the 30 surviving A-8 fighter trainers were sold back to the United States as P-36Gs. Initially, 36 Douglas DB-8A-5/A-33s (company numbers 715/750) on order from the United States were turned over in late 1940 for use as an advanced trainer. A decision to standardize on British types that would be used in operations led to arrangements being made later in 1941 for the flight training of Norwegian pilots to be carried out in RAF and RCAF schools. Consequently, the Model 8A-5s were declared surplus to Norwegian requirements and disposed of in sales abroad.

== Move to Muskoka ==
With the Norwegian Navy and Army pilot training operating as individual courses, there were inevitable commonalities and for the benefit of efficiency, the Norwegian government-in-exile consolidated both services into a unified force, renamed as the Royal Norwegian Air Force. The official declaration was made on 11 November 1944, although combined training operations were already taking place. In May 1942, the training camp was moved to a 430-acre (1.7 km^{2}) site at Muskoka Airport, about 79 miles (127 km) north of Toronto. Under the auspices of a Lend-Lease agreement, an additional order of 50 Fairchild PT-26/PT-26B Cornells was placed with the first deliveries being received by 1942. The training continued at Muskoka until February 1945, when the camp was moved to the air base at Winkleigh in Devon, England.

== Further moves ==
After the move to England, the "Norwegian Training Base" as it was then known, was reconstituted under No. 23 Group RAF. The order for new Cornells was redirected to England, with many of the aircraft arriving by sea, still in their shipping crates. Additionally, nine Airspeed Oxfords and 27 Harvard advanced trainers were obtained. By 22 November 1945, the training was transferred to a base at Gardermoen, near Oslo, concentrating on primary training with the remaining 74 Cornells. The final move of the air training operation was to Rygge, where flight training continued until the end of hostilities and into the postwar period, being wound up in 1952, when all military training was transferred back to new training units in Norway.

== Accidents and incidents ==
During flight training, there were several accidents with the loss of students and instructors.

On 20 June 1941, while taking off, a Northrop N-3PB collided with the ferry Sam McBride in Port Race, Toronto Harbour, killing both the student pilot, Tron Harsvik, and instructor, Lt. Finn Strand Kjos. The Toronto Star newspaper wrote that it was "a matter of time before one of the Norwegian aircraft crashes in the city itself." This fear, along with it being impractical to have flight training in the same place as the current civil aviation operations, precipitated a move to a new camp in Muskoka. At the new location, both ab-initio and advanced level training could take place, while advanced flight training continued at Island Airport.

The first fatal accident in Muskoka, and the last one recorded by the FTL in Canada, took place August 1944 when a Fairchild PT-19 Cornell trainer with pilot and student aboard lost its wing and crashed into the ground, south of Gravenhurst; both on board died. The bodies were recovered from the dense undergrowth and a wing section was found, but no wreckage was recovered. Not long after, another Fairchild crashed for the same reason, but both occupants escaped by parachute. Fairchild aircraft were temporarily grounded, but after the cause of the accidents were determined and other aircraft repaired, Fairchilds were again in service.

The FTL lost three N-3PBs in Canada in fatal crashes, two near Vancouver (Jericho Beach and Patricia Bay), when the harbour in Toronto was frozen, along with the aircraft involved in the ferry boat accident. Other training accidents included fatal crashes in the Curtiss P-36s, one near Toronto in April 1941, another near Port Credit in July 1941 and a final loss into Lake Ontario in January 1942. In all, 23 people at the Air Force training camp died in flying accidents, in addition to the seven who died of disease, car accidents or by drowning.

== Legacy ==
In total during the war, over 2,500 Norwegian airmen of all categories (pilots, navigators and mechanics) were trained in the various bases of "Little Norway".

In 1986 the city of Toronto established Little Norway Park where the people of Norway have erected a plaque "Little Norway: Lille Norge" to commemorate the site of the original camp. In 2007 the governments of Norway and Canada made a memorial inside the Muskoka Airport terminal building to commemorate the Muskoka site.

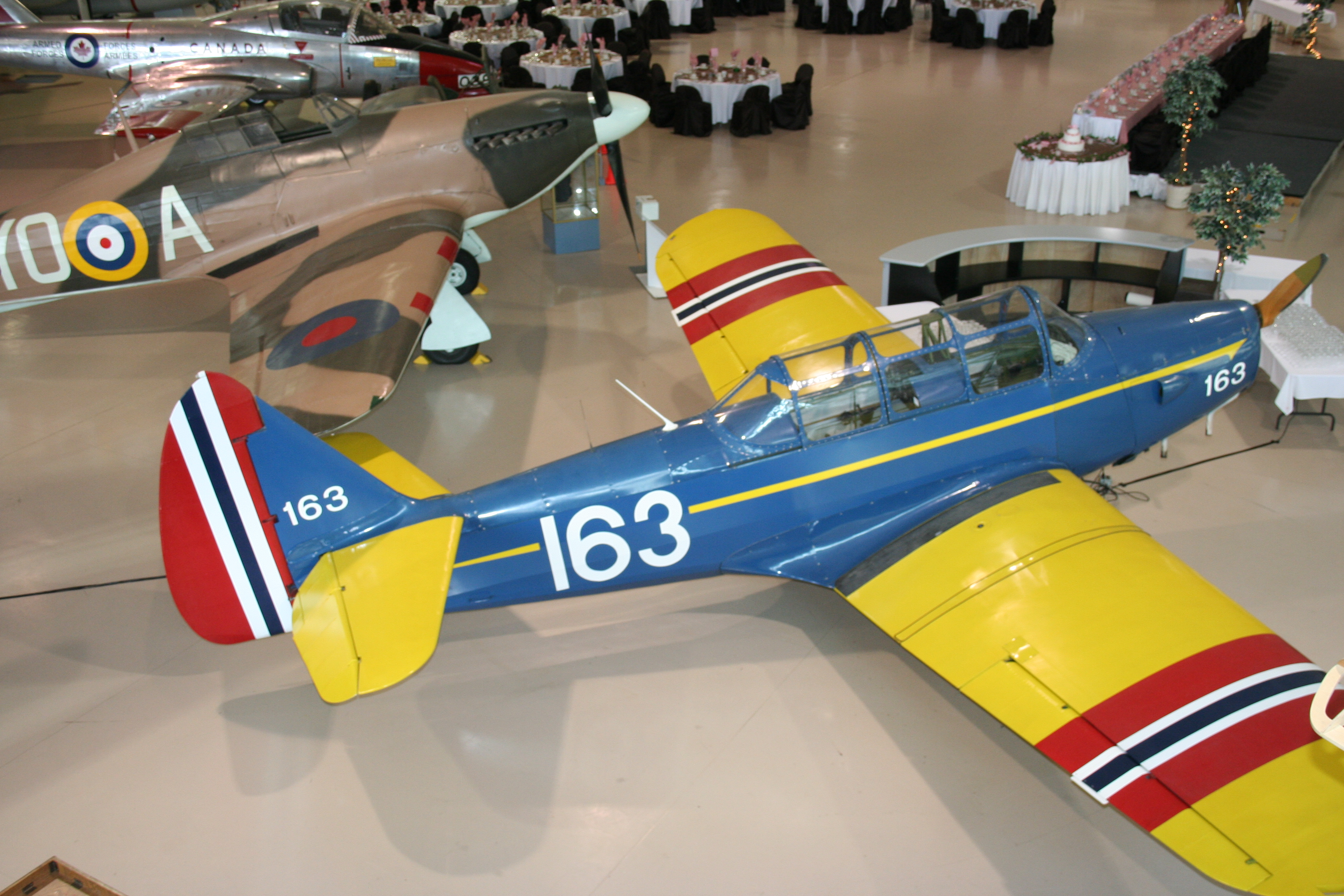
Fairchild PT-26 in the colour scheme used in the Little Norway training camp, Canadian Warplane Heritage Museum

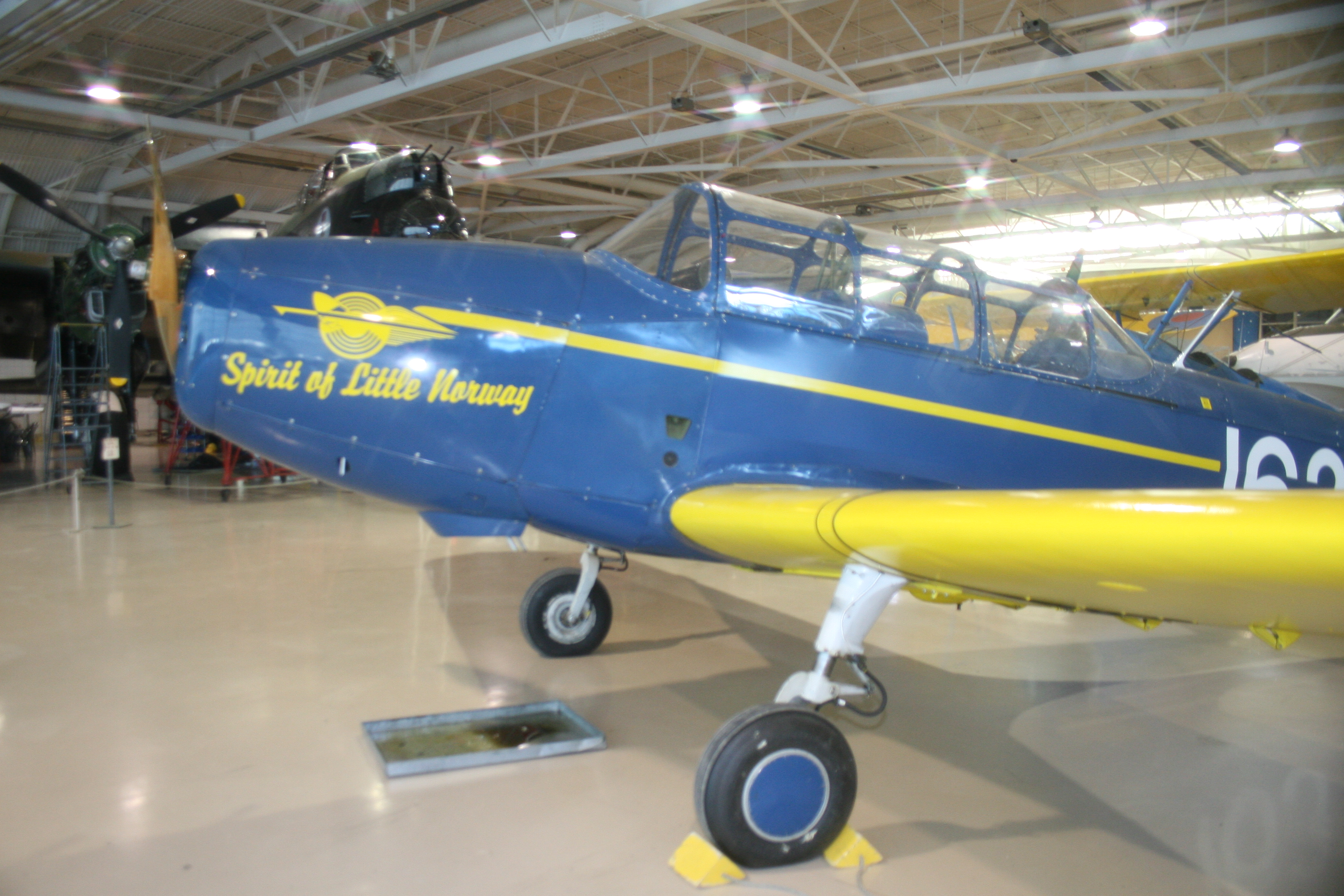
Closeup of Fairchild PT-26 nose art

== Aircraft used in "Little Norway" ==
Army

- Fairchild M-62/ PT-19 and PT-26 Cornell
- Douglas 8A-5/A-33
- Curtiss Hawk 75-A8

Navy

- Noorduyn Norseman
- Stinson SR-9 Reliant
- Northrop N-3PB
