= Viggo Widerøe =

Norwegian businessman (1904–2002)

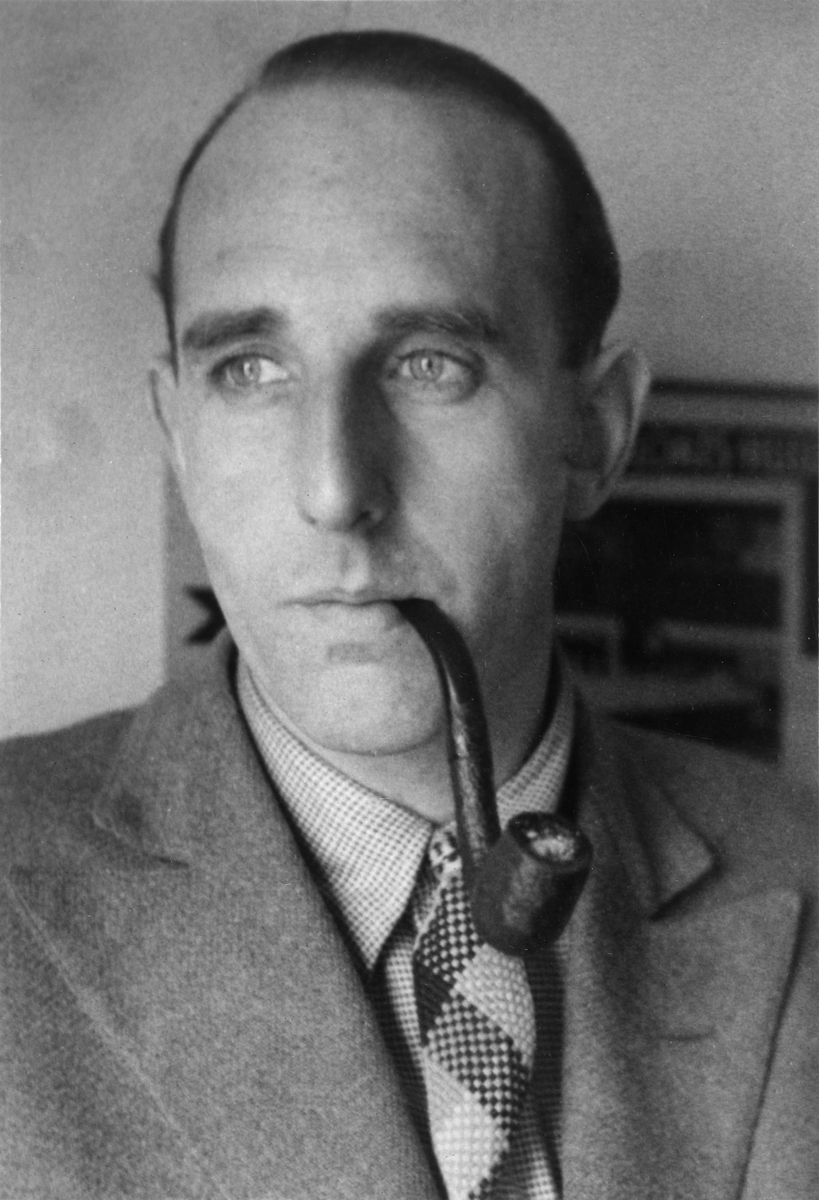
Viggo Widerøe (1940)

Viggo Widerøe (13 August 1904 – 8 January 2002) was a Norwegian aviator and entrepreneur. He founded Widerøe's Flyveselskap, Norway's third largest airline, in 1934. The airline is still in operation today.

== Personal life ==
Viggo Widerøe was born in Kristiania (now Oslo), the son of the mercantile agent Theodor Widerøe (1868–1947) and Carla Johanne Launer (1875–1971). He was a brother of the engineer and accelerator physicist Rolf Widerøe, and grew up at Vinderen. In 1935 he married Solveig Agnes Schrøder (1914–1989); they had a daughter Turi Widerøe. Through her, Viggo Widerøe was the father-in-law of Karl Erik Harr between 1972 and 1975.

== Career ==
Reportedly, Viggo Widerøe had decided to become an aviator already in 1910. This was one year after the start of aviation in Kristiania. In 1924, Widerøe joined the Royal Norwegian Navy Air Service and received a pilot's licence the following year. He became a conscript pilot for the RNNAS until 1 January 1928, when he was appointed an officer. Widerøe took his civilian pilot's licence on 13 June 1930 with Norske Luftruter and worked for the company until the end of summer of 1930. Two years later, Viggo Widerøe bought John Strandrud's shares in Rundflyvning, that was based in Drammen, and started as a pilot. In 1933, Viggo Widerøe established the company Widerøe & Bjørneby along with Halvor Bjørneby and bought a Simmonds Spartan. In all these companies, activity was concentrated at aerial photography, advertisement flying, air shows, demonstrations and charter passenger flights. Widerøe lay much emphasis on increasing the public interest in aviation throughout South Norway, and arranged flight shows in 1933 and 1934 through the Norsk Aero Klubb.

On 19 January 1934, Viggo Widerøe founded the company Widerøe's Flyveselskap along with his brother Arild Widerøe and Einar Isdahl. They raised 25,000 kr and Viggo went to the United States, where he bought a Waco cabin biplane that he flew home himself. Postal services started on 18 June on the route Oslo – Kristiansand – Stavanger – Haugesund, making Viggo the first person to fly a scheduled, domestic flight in Norway. In 1936, all concessions for scheduled flights were transferred to Det Norske Luftfartselskap (DNL), and Widerøe had to start again with photography, schools and charter flights. But at the same time, DNL bought 51% of Wideøe's Flyveselskap, and they were subcontracted some postal flights. In the winter of 1936–1937, Viggo attended an expedition by Lars Christensen in the Antarctic with the goal to take aerial photography of the continent's coast. About 80,000 square kilometres (31,000 sq mi) were covered.

In 1937, a personal tragedy struck as Arild Widerøe and other family members lost their lives in an air accident at the Port of Oslo. Two years later, civil aviation was put on hold due to hardships with supply of fuel. Nonetheless, Widerøe provided flight training for exiled Finns during their Winter War of 1939. In 1940, Norway was invaded by Germany as a part of World War II. Viggo joined Milorg, part of the Norwegian resistance. He helped young Norwegian men to flee the country to become war pilots based in foreign countries. Soon, he became a suspect in the eyes of German forces. He was arrested for espionage in May 1941, and was imprisoned at Møllergata 19 for two months. He was sentenced to death, but this was converted to ten years of prison after he held his speech of defence in German. He was transferred to Grini concentration camp in July 1941 as #352 of almost 20,000 prisoners. Another aerial pioneer Helge Skappel was imprisoned there as well, and they spent prison time in Åkebergveien from October to November 1941, before being shipped to Germany via Akershus Fortress. He was imprisoned in Hamburg-Fühlsbuttel from 13 January 1942, and later three other camps in Rendsburg, Dreibergen and Dieburg until he was liberated in March 1945. For the rest of the war, he worked as a secretary and interpreter for the American General George Patton. His wife was also involved in Norwegian resistance work.

After the war, Widerøe was employed as assistant director in the Norwegian Aviation Authority from 1945 to 1946. He then became chief inspector of DNL, and then became one of the first Norwegian employees when Scandinavian Airlines System (SAS) was established, after he had moved to Stockholm in Sweden. In SAS, he mainly worked with headhunting people for the new company. In 1947, DNL sold its stake in Widerøe's Flyveselskap to Forenede Industrier. Viggo was headhunted to become managing director, a position he held until 1969. But he continued to also work as a pilot for the company until 1954, when he took his last flight as a pilot. He also flew secret reconnaissance missions in Finnmark for the Norwegian Intelligence Service, as a part of the Cold War, and was in charge of a military aviation school at Hønefoss Airport, Eggemoen from 1950 to 1952.

Widerøe was decorated with the Royal Norwegian Order of St. Olav in 1954, and Mount Widerøe in Antarctica was named after him. Widerøe never made much money from starting his company. He was in debt until the 1980s, and by the 1990s, he only had shares worth NOK 3,000. After retirement, Widerøe remained in Oslo during the summer, but spent his winters in L'Alfàs del Pi in Spain. He died in January 2002 in Oslo.
