= Norwegian Armed Forces Aircraft Collection =

Military aviation museum in Norway

Coordinates: 60°11′20.95″N 11°4′10.39″E

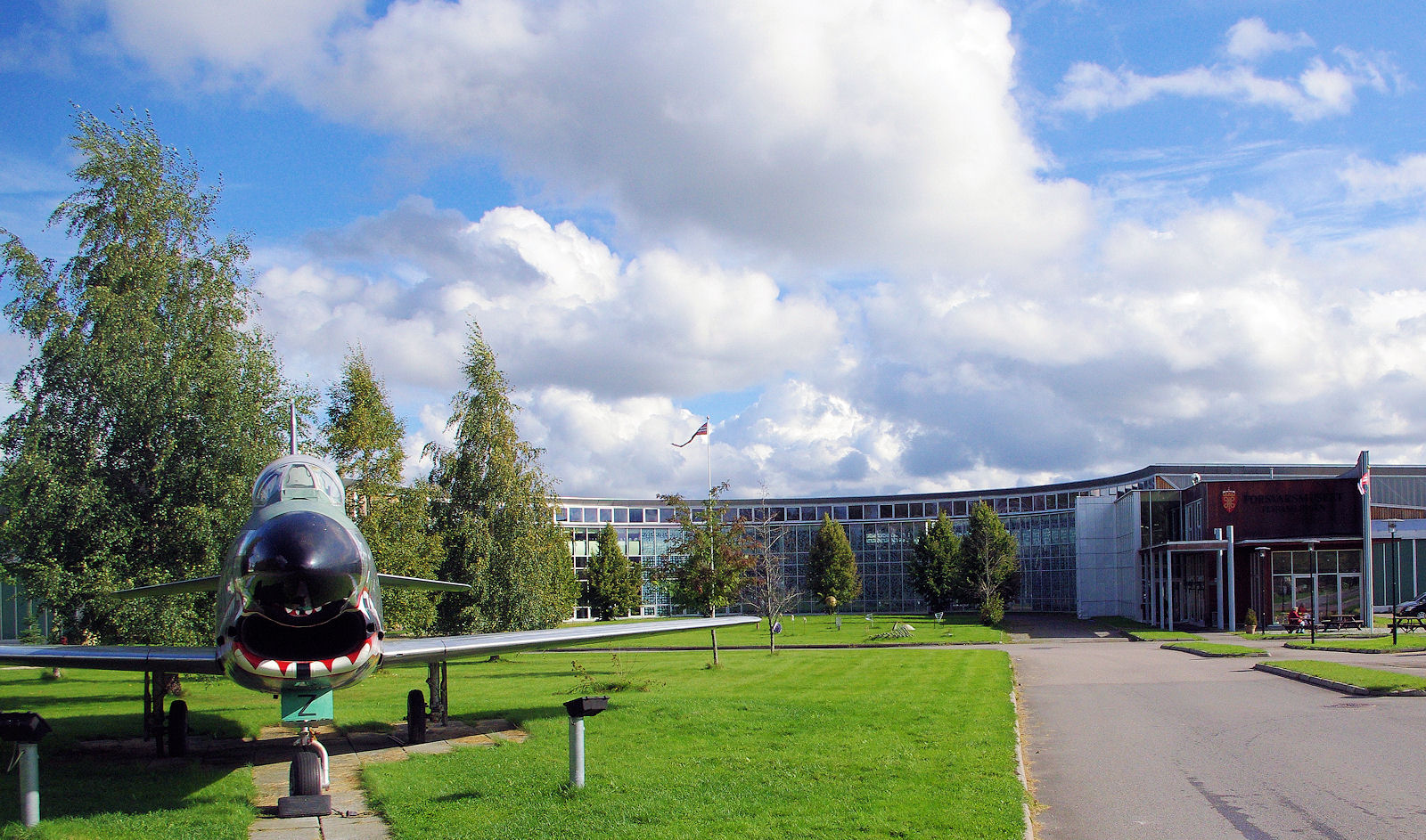
Norwegian Armed Forces Aircraft Collection

Norwegian Armed Forces Aircraft Collection (Forsvarets flysamling Gardermoen) is a military aviation museum located at Gardermoen, north of Oslo in Akershus county, Norway. The founding of the Norwegian Aviation Historical Society in 1967, gave the first boost to the idea of preserving aircraft in Norway. The Collection's Heinkel He 111 and Northrop N-3PB are among the aircraft traced, recovered and restored at the instigation of the NAHS. From the latter part of the 1970s onwards, a considerable number of historical aircraft were assembled in an old ex-Luftwaffe hangar at Gardermoen and from the mid-1980s the public were admitted to the hangar during summer. Most of the activities were - and still are - based on voluntary effort.

The establishment of the Norwegian Aviation Museum in Bodø in 1992 created in intense debate in the country, especially since it was the original intention to transfer all objects at Gardermoen to Bodø. After some years a compromise was found, and in 1997 funds were allocated for a new building at Gardermoen to house a military aviation museum. The new building was inaugurated in May 2000. From 1 January 2015 the collection is part of the Norwegian Air Force Museum/Armed Forces Museums.

== List of aircraft on display ==
- Auster (Taylorcraft) J/1 Autocrat, representing type of aircraft used by No. 132 (Norwegian) Wing - numbering Nos 331 and 331 Squadrons RAF Fighter Command - in the UK and on the Continent during World War II. The museum's example is ex-civil composite.
- Bell 47 D-1, in operational use by the Royal Norwegian Air Force from 1953 to 1970.
- Bell UH-1B, in operational use by the RNoAF from 1963 to 1990.
- Canadair CF-104 Starfighter. Used by No. 334 Squadron Royal Norwegian Air Force from 1973 to 1982.
- Cessna O-1A Birddog, the museum's example was stationed at Gardermoen and Torp. Type was in Norwegian service from 1960 to 1992.
- de Havilland Vampire F.3, in use by the RNoAF from 1948 to 1955. The museum's aircraft is Norway's very first jet fighter.
- de Havilland Vampire T.55, in use by the RNoAF from 1951 to 1955. The aircraft displayed is a converted FB.50 single-seater donated by Sweden.
- De Havilland Canada DHC-6 Twin Otter. Light transport aircraft in Norwegian service from 1967 to 31 December 2000. The museum's aircraft was also used during Penguin missile tests in the Caribbean in 1984.
- DFS 108-14 Schulgleiter S.G.38. Representing glider used for selection of potential aircrew among Norwegian refugees in neutral Sweden during the last part of World War II. The museum's aircraft is ex-civil and still carries civil markings.
- Douglas C-47A, transport aircraft used by the RNoAF from 1950 to 1974.
- Fairchild Cornell M-62, This aircraft came in three versions: PT-19, PT-23 and PT-26. PT-19 and PT-26 were used by the Norwegians, first at the training base Little Norway in Canada from August 1940 and later in Norway until 1957. The museum's PT-19 is one of the first batch of six such trainers entering service in August 1940.

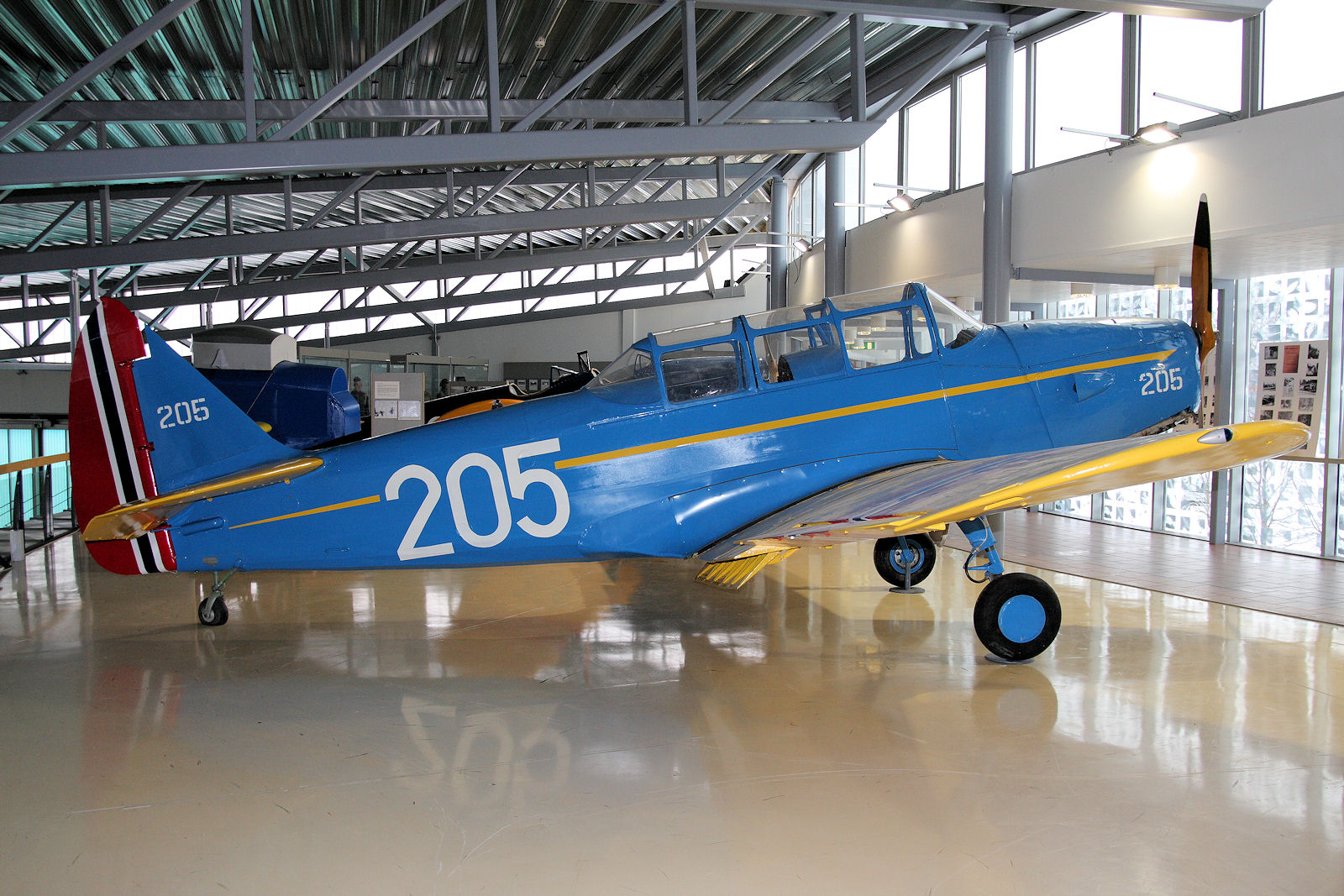
Fairchild PT-26

- Farman F.46, trainer in use by the Army Air Force from 1921 to 1925.
- General Dynamics F-16 Fighting Falcon (F-16AM)
- Heinkel He 111P-2 Built in 1938, served with Luftwaffe Kampfgeschwader 4 after invasion of Norway in April 1940 and made emergency landing at Digervarden after combat with two Fleet Air Arm Blackburn Skuas on 26 April 1940. Recovered in 1976 and later restored at Gardermoen.
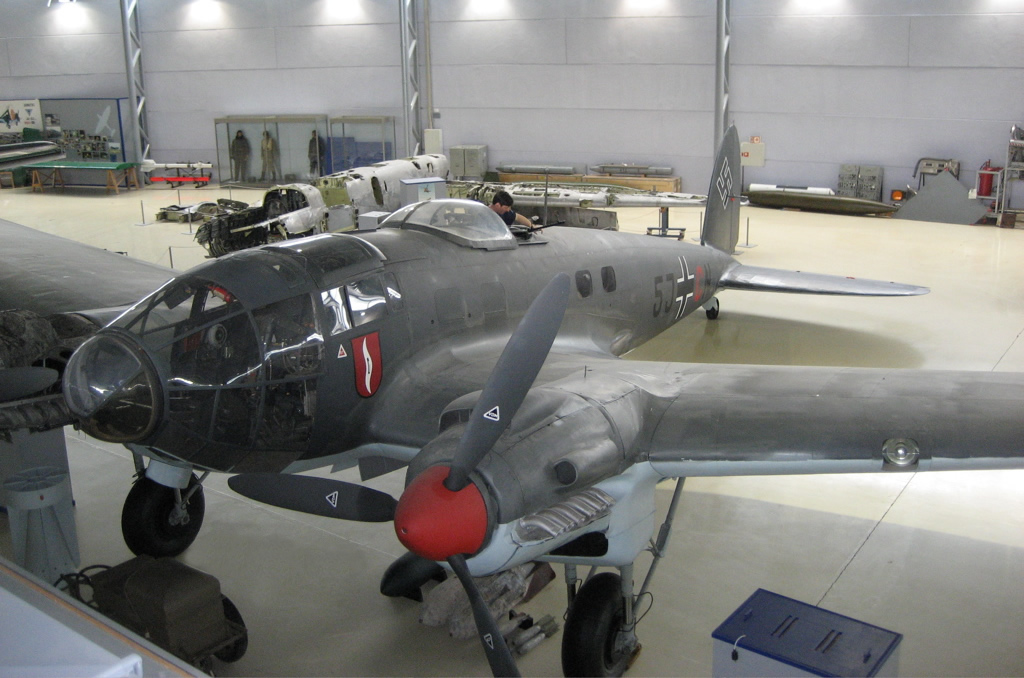
  The He 111 P-2, Wk Nr 1526, built in 1939
- Interstate S.1A Cadet. Used at Little Norway during World War II and came to Norway in 1945. Wreck donated to NAHS in 1970 and later restored by society members.
- Junkers Ju 52/3m-g4e. One of 13 used for carrying a battery of mountain artillery to German forces in the Narvik area on 13 April 1940. Landed on the frozen lake Hartvikvatnet and later sank through the ice. Recovered in 1983 and restored at Gardermoen.
- Junkers Ju 88C-2. Heavy German fighter. Made emergency landing at Nonsfjellet in May 1940. Recovered in 1990 and is being used for spares in the restoration of Ju 88A-1.
- Junkers Ju 88A-1. German bomber. Served with Kampfgeschwader 30 during the invasion of Norway in April 1940, landed on the frozen lake Jonsvatnet near Trondheim on 20 April 1940. Later sank and was recovered in 2004. Under long-term restoration in the museum's workshop.
- Kjeller PK X-1, experimental helicopter constructed by Paul Kjølseth at Kjeller in 1955.

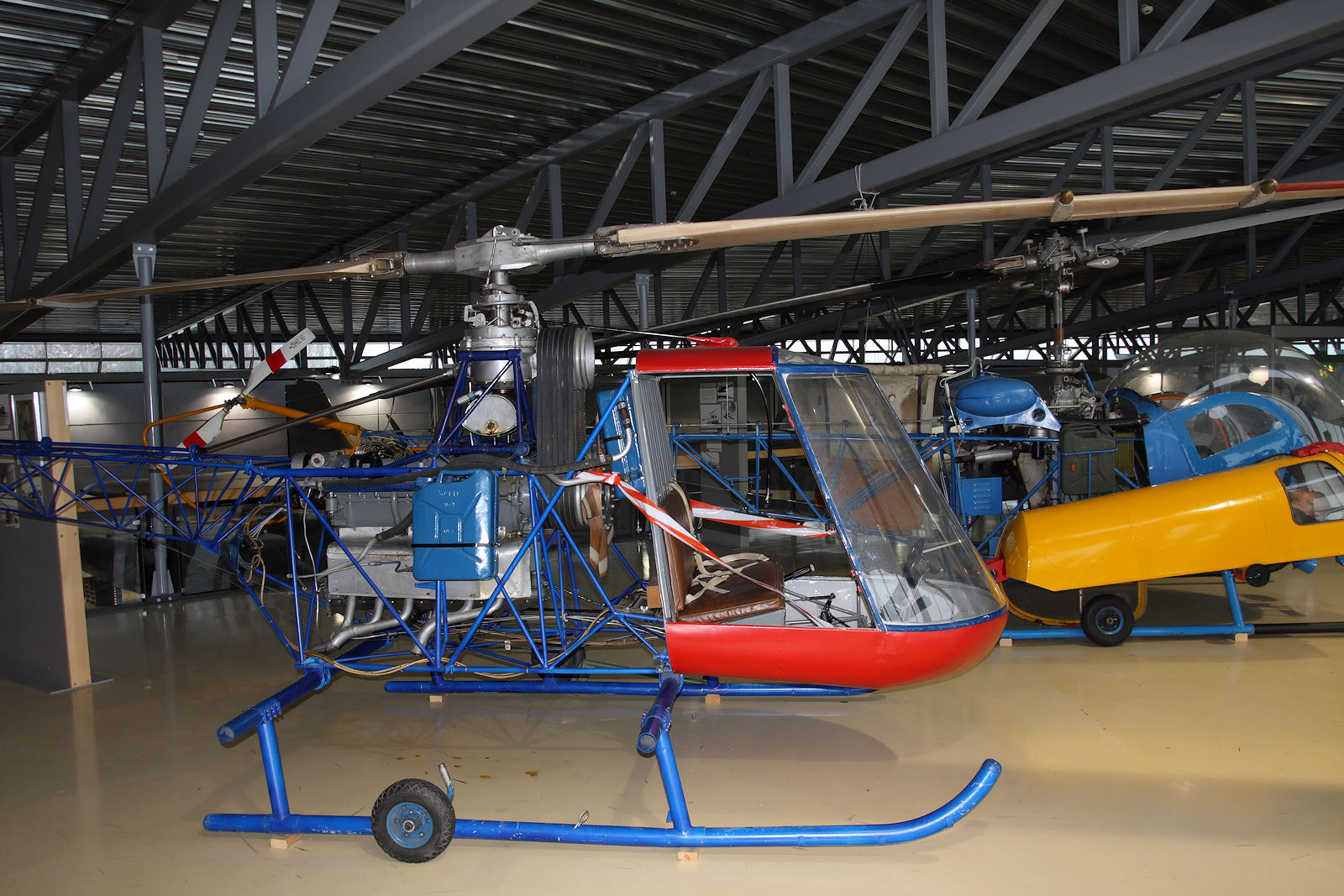
PK X-1. Bell 47 in the background

- Lockheed C-60A Lodestar. Type of transport used on the 'Stockholm run' between Leuchars in Scotland and Bromma near Stockholm in neutral Sweden during World War II. The museum's aircraft was not used on the route but is from the same production batch as Norwegian aircraft.
- Lockheed C-130H Hercules. In service with No 335 Squadron RNoAF from 1969 to 2008, when it was replaced by the C-130J.
- Lockheed TF-104G Starfighter. In service with No 331 Squadron from 1975 to 1981 and then No 334 Squadron to 1982.
- Lockheed T-33A Shooting Star used by the RNoAF from 1953 to 1968.
- MBB Bo 105. Under restoration.
- Noorduyn Norseman Mk.IV. Light transport in service from 1953 to 1954.
- North American F-86F Sabre. Type in service from 1957 to 1966. The museum's aircraft saw service with No 332 Squadron from 1961 to 1962 and was later used as an instructional airframe.
- North American F-86 K Sabre. Single seat all weather fighter in RNoAF service 1955-1967
- Northrop F-5 Freedom Fighter. All three versions used by the RNoAF from 1966 onwards are on display; F-5A fighter, F-5B trainer (the museum's example has been converted for electronic countermeasures operations) and RF-5A(G) photo-reconnaissance fighter.

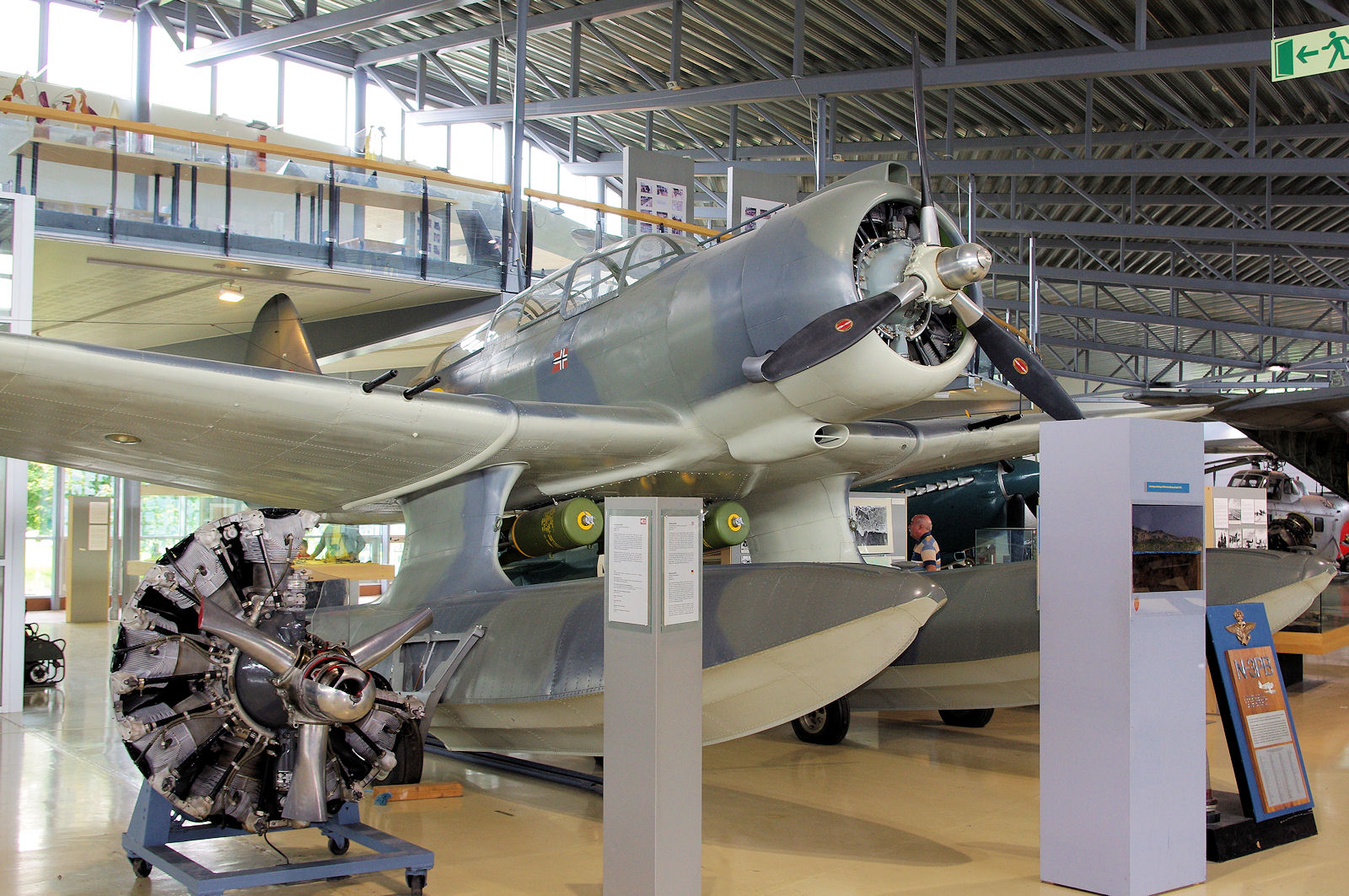
Northrop N-3PB. Sole preserved aircraft of its type

- Northrop N-3PB. This unique aircraft served with No 330 squadron in Iceland from 1941 to 1943. In April 1943 it encountered bad weather on a flight from Budareyri to Reykjavík and crashed in the river Þjórsá. Recovered in 1979 and restored by Northrop Inc in Hawthorne, California the following year.
- Piper L-18C Super Cub. Air OP aircraft in Norwegian use from 1955 to 1992.
- Republic F-84G Thunderjet. In RNoAF service from 1951 to 1960. The museum's aircraft was used by No 331 Squadron from 1954 and from 1958 to 1960 by No 338 Squadron.
- Republic RF-84F Thunderflash. In service with No 717 Squadron from 1956 to 1969.
- Royal Aircraft Factory B.E.2e. The museum's aircraft arrived Norway in 1917 and served with the Army Air Force until 1924.
- Rumpler Taube Start. Norway's first combat aircraft, purchased by private means in May 1912. On 1 June 1912 Lieutenant Hans Fleischer Dons of the Royal Norwegian Navy carried out the first flight by a Norwegian in a Norwegian aircraft in Norway with this Taube.
- SAAB 91B-2 Safir. Type used for training from 1956 to 1982.
- Saab JA 37 Viggen. Front fuselage only. Visitors invited to try out cockpit.
- Sikorsky H-19D-4 Chickasaw. In service from 1958 to 1967.
- Supermarine Spitfire PR XI. This version of the Spitfire was used by the RNoAF from 1947 to 25 March 1954, when the last flight by a Spitfire in Norwegian service was carried out by Second Lieutenant Amund Klepp in this aircraft.
- Westland Lynx Mk. 86
- Westland Sea King Mk.43
- The museum also houses an extensive collection of anti-aircraft weapons and equipment, including a number of guns as well as examples of NIKE Hercules and NIKE Ajax missiles. A full-scale fibreglass Spitfire IX replica hangs under the ceiling.

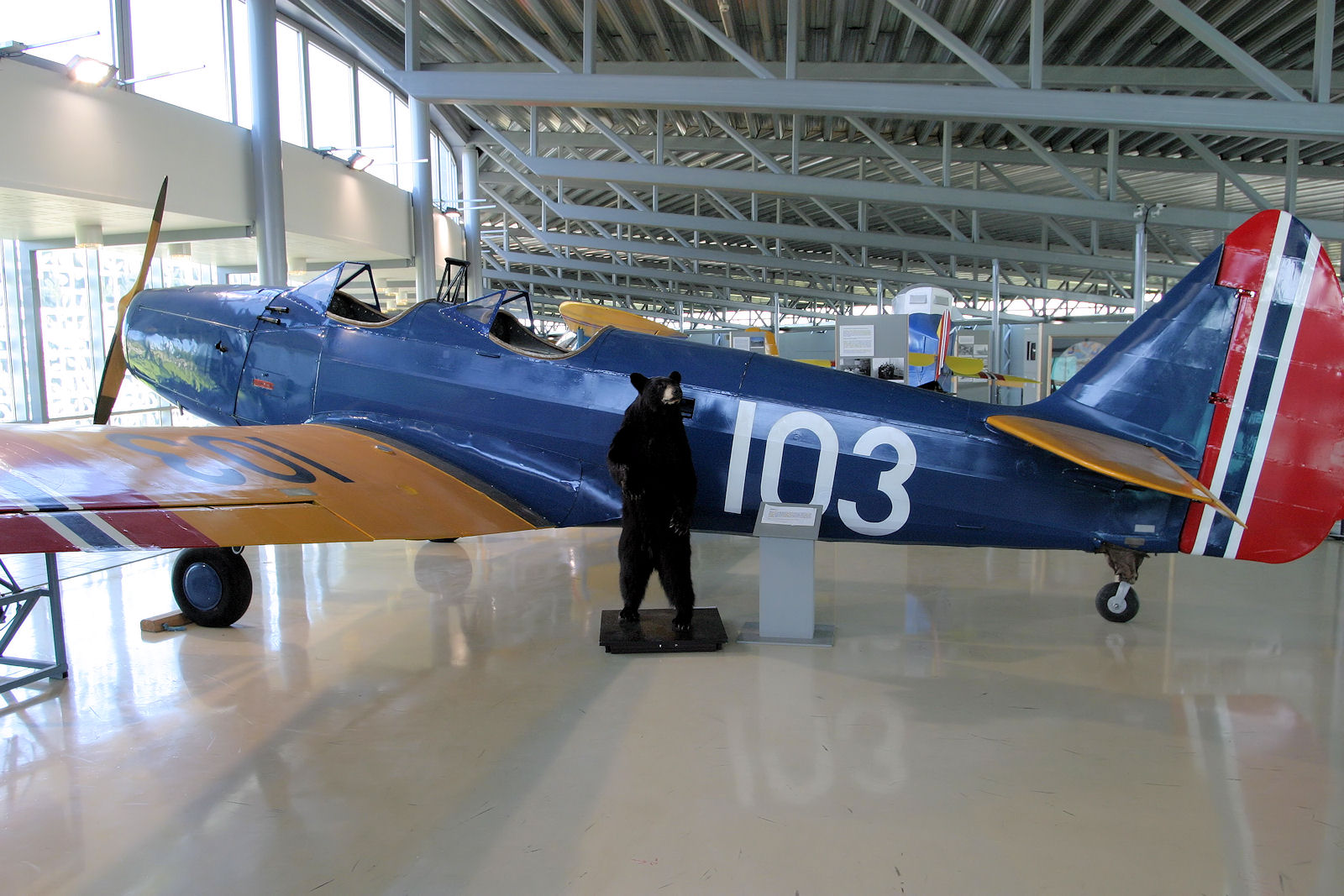
Fairchild PT-19

== Aircraft under restoration ==
- Ju-88A-1 Wrk No 088119, U4+TK recovered from lake Jonsvatnet in 2004

== See also ==
- List of aerospace museums
