= Rolf Widerøe =

Accelerator physicist and engineer (1902–1996)

- Rolf Wideroe
- Born: 11 July 1902; Oslo/Kristiania, Norway
- Died: 11 October 1996 (aged 94); Obersiggenthal, Switzerland
- Education: Karlsruhe Institute of Technology, RWTH Aachen University
- Known for: Linac, betatron, particle therapy
- Relatives: Viggo Widerøe (brother); Turi Widerøe (niece)
- Scientific career
- Fields: Physics (Accelerator physics)
- Workplaces: Brown, Boveri & Cie, ETH Zürich
- Doctoral advisor: Walter Rogowski
- Doctoral students: Walter Mauderli

Rolf Widerøe (11 July 1902 – 11 October 1996) was a Norwegian accelerator physicist who was the originator of many particle acceleration concepts, including the resonance accelerator and the betatron accelerator.

== Early life ==
Widerøe was born in Kristiania (now Oslo) in 1902 as a son of the mercantile agent Theodor Widerøe (1868–1947) and Carla Johanne Launer (1875–1971). He was a brother of the aviator and entrepreneur Viggo Widerøe who became the founder of the Norwegian airline Widerøe. After his A-level exams (Examen artium) in the summer of 1920 at the Halling School in Oslo, Widerøe left for the university of Karlsruhe, Germany, to study electrical engineering.

=== Betatron accelerator concept ===
There he conceived the concept of electromagnetic induction to accelerate electrons, which became the basis of what would be known as betatron. This idea was to use a vortex field surrounding a magnetic field for cyclic acceleration of electrons in a tube.

== Return to Germany ==
In 1924, he returned to Norway for a short time period, working in a locomotive facility of the Norwegian State Railways, where he fulfilled his 72-day military service. He went back to Germany in 1925. There he studied at the Technical University at Aachen, where he proposed a thesis in 1927 for an experimental betatron accelerator, incorporating the work of Swedish scientist Gustav Ising of 1924, which was not successful at first. Thus, Widerøe instead built a linear accelerator prototype based on Isings proposal and made this the topic of his dissertation under Walter Rogowski. In 1928, he relocated to Berlin and started building protective relays during his work at AEG. In 1933 Hitler came to power in Germany and Widerøe decided to return to Norway.

=== Resonance accelerator ===
From his betatron experiment, he developed further ideas of particle acceleration without the necessity of high voltage. The method was resonating particles with a radio frequency electric field to add energy to each traversal of the field. This experiment was successful and published in 1928, and became the progenitor of all high-energy particle accelerators. Widerøe's article was studied by Ernest Lawrence in the United States, and used as the basis for his creation of the cyclotron in 1929.

== War time ==
In 1941 his younger brother Viggo Widerøe was arrested for resistance work. In 1943 the Germans "invited" Rolf Widerøe to Germany to continue to work on the Betatron. Inspired by the opportunity to continue his research and promises that his brother would have a better situation in his imprisonment, he agreed to go to Hamburg and start building a German Betatron. During this period, already in 1943, he introduced the theoretical concept of colliding particles head-on to increase interaction energy and a storage ring device. Several sources claims that his Norwegian citizenship was ultimately revoked for working with the Nazi government, but this is not correct. His Norwegian passport was confiscated for some time and he accepted a penalty notice of NOK 5000, loss of civil liberties and to forfeit NOK 120000 of the amount he was paid in licence fees for use of his patent rights during the betatron development. In the end, early in 1946, he received an intermediate passport and emigrated to Switzerland.

== Later years ==
In 1946 he filed a patent in Norway for an accelerator based on synchronous acceleration. He would go on to publish over 180 papers in scientific and engineering journals, and filed over 200 patent applications over his lifetime. In his later life he devoted much time to medicinal technology, focusing on cancer treatment, including developing megavolt radiation therapy technologies. He would collaborate with CERN beginning in 1952 doing the preliminary studies for the Proton Synchrotron, lectured at ETH Zurich in 1953, and collaborated at DESY in 1959 in Hamburg.

Rolf Widerøe died on 11 October 1996 in Obersiggenthal, Switzerland.

Since 2011 the European Physical Society has awarded a prize in Widerøe's memory every three years to individuals in recognition of outstanding work in the field of accelerator physics.

== Honors ==
- Doctorate Honoris Causa-RWTH Aachen (1962)
- Honorary Medical Doctorate-Zurich University (1964)
- Röntgen Medal (1969)
- Röntgen prize (1972)
- JRC gold medal (1973)
- Robert R. Wilson Prize (1992)

== Memberships ==
- Norwegian Academy of Science
- American Physical Society
- American Radium Society
- British Institute of Radiology
- Deutsche Röntgengesellschaft
- European Society for Radiation Therapy ESTRO
- European Physical Society
- Naturforschende Gesellschaft
- Norwegian Society of Radiology
- Norwegian Society of Physics
- Schweizerische Physikalische Gesellschaft
- Schweizerische Gesellschaft für Radiobiologie
- Scandinavian Society for Medical Physics
- Society of Nuclear Medicine
