= Kjeller Airfield =

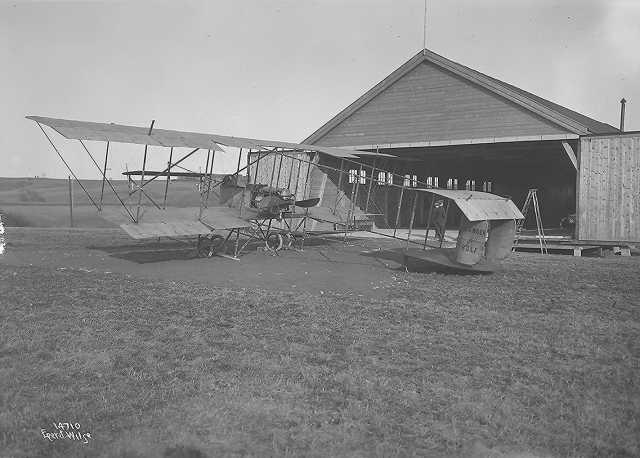
- Kjeller in 1913 with the Norwegian Army Air Service' first aircraft, Ganger Rolf
- IATA: QMJ; ICAO: ENKJ

Summary
- Airport type: Joint
- Owner: Norwegian Defence Logistics Organization
- Operator: Kjeller Aero Senter
- Serves: Oslo
- Location: Kjeller, Lillestrøm, Norway
- Elevation AMSL: 354 ft / 108 m
- Coordinates: 59°58′10″N 011°02′20″E
- Interactive map of Kjeller Airfield

Runways
Direction	Length		Surface
Direction	m	ft	Surface
12–30	1,357	4,452	Asphalt
- Source: AIP at Eurocontrol

Kjeller Airfield (Norwegian: Kjeller flyplass; ICAO: ENKJ) is a military and general aviation aerodrome located in Kjeller in Lillestrøm in Akershus county, Norway. Situated on the outskirts of Lillestrøm, it is 9 nautical miles (17 km; 10 mi) east northeast of Oslo, making it the aerodrome closest to the capital. The field has a single 1,735-meter (5,692 ft) asphalt runway numbered 12–30, with a declared distance of 1,357-meter (4,452 ft). The airport is owned by the Norwegian Defence Logistics Organization, while civilian operations are carried out by Kjeller Aero Senter. The main military activity is the Aerospace Industrial Maintenance Norway, the main maintenance facility for the Royal Norwegian Air Force (RNoAF).

The aerodrome became the first in Norway when it was established in September 1912 to serve the Norwegian Army Air Service. The break-out of World War I resulted in a major expansion of the airfield, followed by military aircraft factory Kjeller Flyfabrikk moving to Kjeller in 1916. Gradual expansions took place in the following decades. The airfield was occupied by the Luftwaffe on 10 April 1940, resulting in Junkers, Daimler-Benz, BMW and Brinker Eisenwerk establishing various maintenance facilities. After liberation in 1945, the RNoAF converted Kjeller to a maintenance base and placed the Air Force Logistics Command there from 1952. Runway expansions took place in 1951, 1959 and 1975.

== History ==
=== Establishment ===
Kjeller Airfield was the first aerodrome established in Norway. The need for an aerodrome for the Norwegian Army Air Service arose in September 1912, after the first four pilots had been trained and the two first aircraft, Maurice Farman Longhorns, obtained. Two of the pilots went scouting around Lillestrøm on 8 September to find a suitable location for an airfield, and settled on Kjeller after two days of reconnaissance. The area was selected because of its vicinity to the capital and its flat geography. The first aircraft, Ganger Rolf, was hauled to Kjeller by horse on 14 September, where it was assembled and flew for the first time on 21 September. Construction of a hangar was subcontracted to Strømmens Trævarefabrik on 13 September, and the structure was completed on 27 September. The first flight to another aerodrome took place on 3 October, when a plane flew to what is today Trondheim Airport, piloted by Einar Sem-Jacobsen, the commander at Kjeller.

At first the airfield was no more than a plot 100 by 40 meters (330 by 130 ft). The army rented space at Kjeller Farm, which was owned by M. H. Brøther and Minister of Foreign Affairs Nils Claus Ihlen. The farm had a telephone and provided office space and living spaces for the airfield staff. The army thus hired a cook for the establishment. Aircraft would often land at various fields in Skedsmo as part of the training. The airport was gradually expanded and within a year of the opening measured 160 by 60 meters (520 by 200 ft). Polar explorer Roald Amundsen started his flight training in 1913 and took Norway's first civilian pilot's license on 11 June 1914. On 18 August 1913 two departments were established at Kjeller: a technical and a tactical. The former had the responsibility for introductory training and maintenance, while the latter had advanced training and flight operations. These two divisions remained until they were merged in 1917.

With the break-out of World War I in 1914 the airfield became subject to a major expansion. In two years the field was expanded from 4 hectares (9.9 acres) rented land to 70 hectares (170 acres) owned land, of which the airport itself65 hectares (160 acres). This took place by the state buying a lot on the other side of the creek of Sogna. Hence there were two areas of the aerodrome, which both served as runways. The original was known as Skoleplassen, the newer as Granasletta, later as the "outer airport". At the time the border between the then independent municipalities of Skedsmo and Lillestrøm ran through the airport. The airport was organized such that it was supposed to cultivate spare areas on its land. The army expected that this was done such that it gave earnings, while keeping it suitable for flights.

The army established a pilot school on 1 July 1914, which initially accepted four regular students and one mechanic. By September both Longhorns had been wrecked and written off, stopping further training. By then only one pupil had completed the course. Training resumed after new aircraft were delivered in mid-1915. Hærens Flyvemaskinfabrikk, which had been established in 1914 in Sagene in Oslo, moved to Kjeller in May 1916, at the same time the airport was flooded. Four sheds were constructed for the factory. By 1917 a 100-meter (330 ft) long hangar had been completed.

=== Early years ===
From 1 July 1916 a one-year military pilot training school was established and one of the hangars was converted to a barracks. Four hundred people applied and twenty were selected for the first class. The first seventeen were certified in June 1917, using Maurice Farman Shorthorns, and organized as its own department. From 1919 the Kjeller-built FF 5 were taken into use. In addition to pilots, the school was responsible for training mechanics. Most years the school would carry out a major four-week exercise in February–March at a different location than the airport.

The Søndenfjeldske Air Wing was formally established in 1917, but did not become operative until 1919, when it had accumulated a combined twenty Farman F.40 and Royal Aircraft Factory B.E.2. A new barracks was completed in early 1918. On 31 May 1919 the a fire struck two of the hangars, burning them to the ground. The insurance money was used to build two new hangars, which were completed in 1923. The school started using the Kjeller-built FF 9 trainer planes from 1922. By 1921 the army concluded that the quality of the aircraft being manufactured at Kjeller did not meet that of internationally produced machines. Hærens Flyvemaskinfabrikk therefore started license-production of aircraft from 1924.

The air wing carried out trial scheduled flights to Hamar and Fredrikstad during the summer of 1920, using the two-seat BE-2s. Eighty-four trips were flown, carrying thirty-five passengers and with five accidents. The air wings main exercise took place in July and August every year. It received Bristol F.2B Fighters in 1921, Hannover Cl.V in 1924 and Fokker C.V in 1928. The barracks was expanded in 1926 and again in 1930. Funding for a garrison at Kjeller was secured from 1933, allowing a permanent staff and the establishment of a full-time workshop.

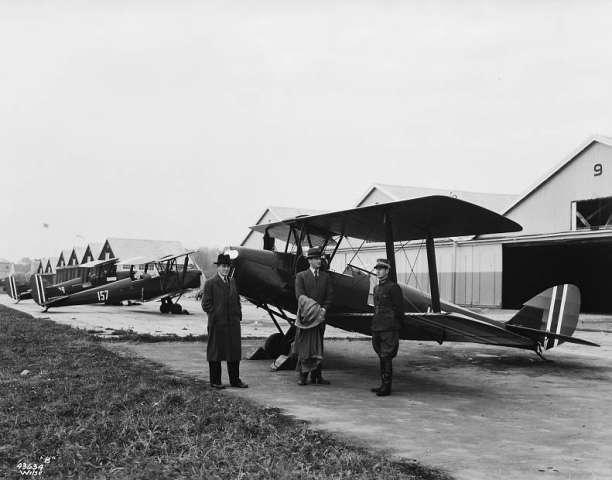
De Havilland Tiger Moths of the Norwegian Army Air Service

The airfield was struck by heavy flooding in 1916, 1927, 1931 and 1934. Because of the recurring floods, the army decided to conduct drainage of the field. Because the creek Sogna flowed between the two sections of the airport, it was desired to build a connection between the two. Sogna was placed in a 240-meter (790 ft) pipeline, allowing it to bypass the aerodrome on its way to Nitelva. Construction started in 1929, but lack of funding delayed completion until 1934. From 1932 the school introduced license-built variants of the De Havilland Moth and Tiger Moth.

In 1933 there were various proposals to start commercial flights to Oslo. KLM investigated Kjeller as a possible site for the extension of their service to Copenhagen, but found that Kjeller did not meet their standards. Thus by 1935 the runway had been expanded to 1,000 by 800 meters (3,300 by 2,600 ft). Although sown with grass, the runway often could not withstand the landing forces of the aircraft. The airfield owner was also concerned with floods and decided to elevate the runway by 2 meters (6 ft 7 in) by filling it up with garbage from Oslo. A trial was run with 5,000 tonnes and described as a success by the army, proposing that a spur from the Trunk Line be built to Kjeller for all of Oslo's 15,000 cubic meters (530,000 cu ft) of garbage be disposed at the airfield. However local residents complained about the stench and effectively halted the project.

Lufthansa started a service to Kjeller during the summer of 1936 as a tentative solution while their seaplane was being overhauled. They put a seventeen-passenger Junkers Ju 52 into the service to London, Copenhagen, Hamburg and Amsterdam. The service was especially popular with travelers to London, as they did not have to transfer at Copenhagen, and the route saw a typical ten to twelve passengers for each of the daily departures. Ground transport was carried out by motor coach, which took twenty-five minutes from Oslo. This was about the same as the ferry used to Gressholmen Airport. Regular services started on 1 June 1938 and lasted until 10 October. The following year the route was transferred to the newly opened Oslo Airport, Fornebu. Lufthansa also carried out a trial flight with a Focke-Wulf Fw 200 on 13 August 1938.

=== World War II ===
On the day before Operation Weserübung, which started the German occupation of Norway on 8 April 1940, warning was received by the air base commander, Harald Normann. The aircraft were evacuated and camouflaged. At the time the airfield was covered in snow, forcing the aircraft to use skis. A large shipment of technical equipment had just been shipped to Sola Air Station, which was unsuccessfully attempted recalled. At two o'clock in the morning of 9 April the aircraft were commanded to fly to Steinsfjorden at sunrise. The first departed at 05:15.

By the time the Luftwaffe attack had set in at 7:55, seven aircraft had been evacuated and were used throughout the Norwegian campaign. One person was killed when the Heinkel He 111 aircraft from Kampfgeschwader 4 bombed the aerodrome to shatters. Because the battalion was the initial target, people at the aircraft factory had time to evacuate. The bombers came in at altitudes below 1,000 meters (3,300 ft), occasionally as low as 25 meters (82 ft). The anti-aircraft guns fired 97 shots, but were unable to shoot down any aircraft, although unconfirmed hits were reported. After three hours of attack the airfield lay in ruins. Minister of Defense Birger Ljungberg announced at 14:07 that Oslo, including Kjeller Airfield, was regarded as lost and all units were ordered to cease fire. However, machine gun fire hit a German Ju 52 transport aircraft at 15:15.

To support the scrambling of men at Gardermoen Air Station and Trandum, it was important to delay a German offensive across Nitelva. Thus one hundred men from the airport were, against the orders of the minister, commanded to put up a defense along the river. The assignment was difficult as there was a large amount of private vehicles evacuating individuals from the capital. The official surrender of the airport and factory took place on 10 April at 08:30. Civilian employees were given a few weeks off before they were ordered to clean up the facilities. Military employees were eventually sent to their hometowns. The first German aircraft, a Ju 52, landed at Kjeller on 10 April at 12:30. After mounting skis it was able to depart three and a half hours later.

During the occupation the aerodrome was under various military administration within the Luftwaffe. Initially the field was covered in snow and thus not suitable for aviation. However, it was often used for accommodation for pilots, as the quarters at Fornebu was packed. The only aircraft stationed were a group of communication aircraft, at first designated Verbindungsstaffel 4, later Verbindungsstaffel Norwegen. This consisted of various aircraft, such as the Ju 52, the Fieseler Fi 156 Storch and Siebel Si 204D and were stationed from 10 May. After the snow disappeared the German forces started construction of a 1,200-by-100-meter (3,940 by 330 ft) wooden runway. First the ground was leveled, then a 25-centimeter (9.8 in) thick layer of gravel was placed and then a wooden cover. The work also included a dam to protect the airport from flooding.

The main Axis used the aerodrome was to serve as a forward mechanical center for Norway. The decision was largely based on the presence of the aircraft factory. A new hall was built, which along with upgrades to the existing gave four halls. In addition a paint shop and large warehouse were built. New workshops had to be built for instruments, radio and electrical equipment. From the summer of 1940 the factory became a division of Junkers Flugzeug- und Motorenwerke. It relied largely on the existing Norwegian workforce, but was forced to extensive retraining because of the advanced construction of the German aircraft. Junkers eventually withdrew and was replaced by Brinker Eisenwerk. The operation kept going until 1944. There was also established two separate motor repair shops, one operated by Daimler-Benz and one operated by Bayerische Motorenwerke (BMW). Both received new concrete halls. The work at the various companies was often met with passive resistance, such as through slow work, demands for work to be redone and occasionally sabotage.

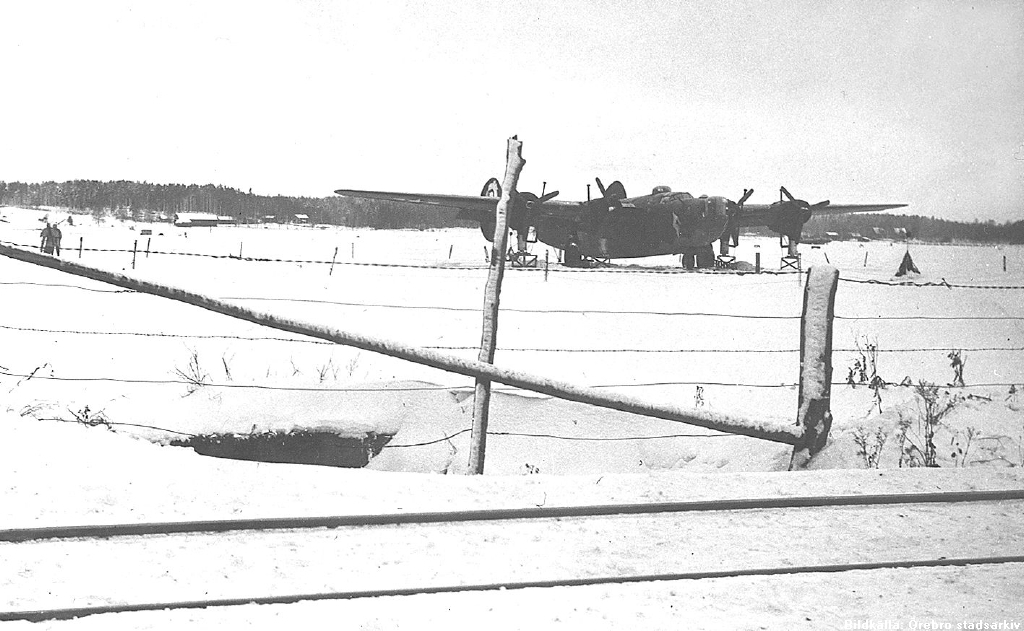
One of the B-24 Liberators which landed in Örebro after 18 November 1943 raid

The first bombing of Kjeller by the Allies was planned for 16 November 1943, but canceled because of the cloudy weather. Two days later the Eighth Air Force of the United States Air Force carried out an attack on Kjeller, using 102 B-24 Liberators to deliver 838 high-explosive bombs. The civilian workforce was away from work as there was a German military exercise being carried out, under supervision of General Nikolaus von Falkenhorst. This caused the anti-aircraft guns to be loaded with blanks and that no-one suspected that it was a real attack until the bombs started raining. Russian prisoners of war were used to clear the undetonated shells. Both Daimler-Benz's workshop and one of the halls were destroyed, as were an estimated twelve aircraft and the rest of the buildings suffered significant damages. German reports concluded with few casualties, while Swedish reports estimate ca. 200.

In the Luftwaffe retaliation, six Liberators were shot down over Skagerrak and four escaped to Sweden. The raid crippled the maintenance: Daimler-Benz moved to Sandefjord, while BMW moved to Alnabru in Oslo. Brinker Eisenwerk remained and soon resumed operations. A new raid was therefore carried out on 20 April 1944 by No. 5 Group of the Royal Air Force, using 51 Avro Lancaster bombers. Twelve Norwegian were killed and the raid effectively stopped all maintenance activity at Kjeller until the end of the war. The aerodrome was surrendered to Norway on 9 May 1945, after the end of the war.

=== Reconstruction ===
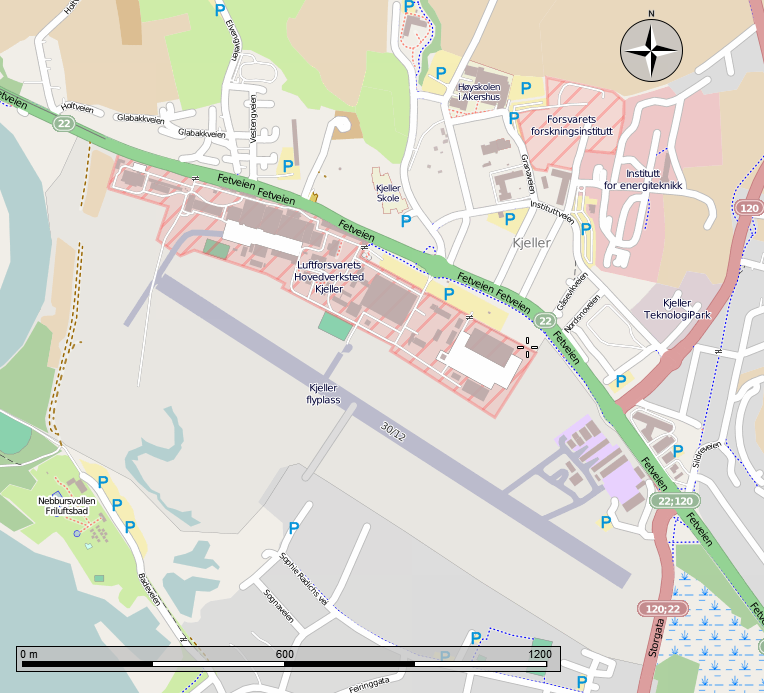
Map of the airfield in 2013, showing the military bases located nearby.

The air base had a capacity for 2,500 men at the end of the war, although the bombing and lack of subsequent repair had left the field in a dilapidated state. The aircraft factory had been dismantled for most of its equipment. It was therefore converted to a pure maintenance facility which was to serve as the main workshop for the newly established Royal Norwegian Air Force (RNoAF). It was hence only to be kept airworthy to such a degree that aircraft could land for maintenance. The workshop's first major task was the renovation of seventeen Fieseler Storchs. The air force established its mechanical school at Kjeller in October 1945 as did the Air Force Communications and Radar School. As the space was limited the technical school was moved to Kjevik Air Station and the latter to Lutvann in February 1946.

The wooden runway caused massive maintenance costs and required the entire strip to be inspected daily for loose planks. By 1948 it was in so poor condition that the air force decided to replace it with a permanent surface. The ground consisted of clay and sand which frost heaving, requiring the upper layer of earthwork to be replaced. Because the German runway had required planes to approach close to Nittebergåsen, the runway was moved eight decrees counterclockwise to meet civilian aviation requirements from the International Civil Aviation Organization. Removal of the wooden runway started on 23 April 1949, and during this work it was discovered that the runway had been mined with dynamite. Drainage started on 10 May and leveling on 8 June. A 15-centimeter (5.9 in) thick layer of concrete was poured starting on 12 July. When it was completed on 9 October, the new runway was 1,150 by 40 meters (3,770 by 130 ft). The strip was officially opened on 15 October.

This allowed a De Havilland Vampire to land and the maintenance division could start servicing jet aircraft. For a semester in 1950, Kjeller was used as a recruit and early pilot school for the air force. More than one hundred people were admitted and the training was the basis for sending them for full education in the United States. Kjeller Flyklubb was established as a civilian aero club in 1950, bought a plane and started pilot training at Kjeller. However, there was little cooperation from the military, who preferred that Kjeller not be used for civilian activities, limiting their activities.

With the order of new F-84 Thunderjets and F-86 Sabres, Kjeller Air Base would need significantly longer runway to take down the fighter jets. In 1951 a runway extension to 2,990 meters (9,810 ft) was proposed, which was NATO standard. The proposal received massive local protests, as it would force the runway to cut through Storgaten, the main road to Lillestrøm, and the Trunk Line, as well as significant areas around Åråsen, reaching all the way to Leira. The military rejected extending westwards, as a crossing of Nitelva would be prohibitively expensive. The debate would continue for several years, including proposals to close the aerodrome.

As part of the establishment of the air force, a material division was established in 1952. Initially known as Kjeller Depot, it became the Air Force Logistics Command from 1 October. At the same time the aircraft factory officially ceased to exist and was merged to the Maintenance Group. However, without a longer runway, the Logistics Command was considered moved to Flesland Air Station or Værnes Air Station. The military accepted gradual decreases to the runway length, first to 2,000 meters (6,600 ft) and then 1,800 meters (5,900 ft). Lillestrøm Municipal Council approved plans for a 1,600-meter (5,200 ft) runway on 2 May 1958. Although this would spare the main road, it would still have to be closed during take-off and landing of jets.

Construction started on 25 August and saw an upgrade to the existing runway through a 15-centimeter (5.9 in) layer of crushed stone being laid on top of the concrete. The runway was extended by ca. 200 meters (660 ft) in each direction, and received a 90-centimeter (35 in) layer of construction aggregate. The entire runway was asphalted, creating a 1,600-by-30-meter (5,249 by 98 ft) surface. The work was completed on 1 June 1959. During construction the airfield has been used for 115 aircraft movements.

=== Joint operations ===
The aero club, which changed its name to Nedre Romerike Flyklubb in 1959, was allowed to operate out of Kjeller from 1964. The air force organized its maintenance such that service on seaplanes and helicopters was carried out at Karljohansvern in Horten. This changed in 1965, when also maintenance of helicopters was carried out at Kjeller. During the 1960s the Norwegian Army's direct support division for Project Nike was placed at Kjeller Air Base.

The runway was further extended all the way to Storgaten between 2 and 29 April 1975, to create a 50-meter (160 ft) overrun. By 1981 the new F-16 Fighting Falcons needed their first overhaul at Kjeller. The runway was by then found unsuitable, as it has cracks and loose parts which could easily be sucked into the engines. During the summer two layers of asphalt were laid and the runway was extended 85 meters (279 ft) westwards all the way to Nitelva. The runway's total length was then 1,735 meters (5,692 ft), but the declared distance was reduced to 1,380 meters (4,530 ft). The work was completed in time for the first F-16 to land on 1 September.

== Operations ==
- Kjeller Aero Senter (KAS)
- Nedre Romerike Flyklubb (NRFK)
- Veteranflygruppen i NRFK (NRFV)
- Oslo Flyklubb (OFK)
- Kjeller Sportsflyklubb (KSK)
- Kjeller Flyhistoriske Forening (KFF)
- Kjeller Aerodrome Norway (KAN)
- Norwegian Spitfire Foundation (NSF)
- Warbirds of Norway (WoN)
- Visit Kjeller
- Aeromech
- HelikopterDrift
- Experimental Aircraft Association Chapter 573 Norway
- Aerospace Industrial Maintenance Norway – AIM Norway

== Accidents and incidents ==
The first lethal accident took place on 1 May 1917, when a Farman F.40 crashed during an attempt to reach the Scandinavian elevation record of 4,000 meters (13,000 ft). The accident was caused by a weak steel tube in the tailplane. The next accident occurred on 23 August near Tangen. The first passenger to be killed was a 17-year-old woman on 1 April 1919, when an Avro 504 spiraled down in an accident where the pilot was able to walk away nearly unhurt. Lethal accidents were frequent and by the break-out of the Second World War nineteen military pilots had been killed in accidents at or around the airport.
