= Norwegian Aviation Museum =

- Norsk Luftfartsmuseum
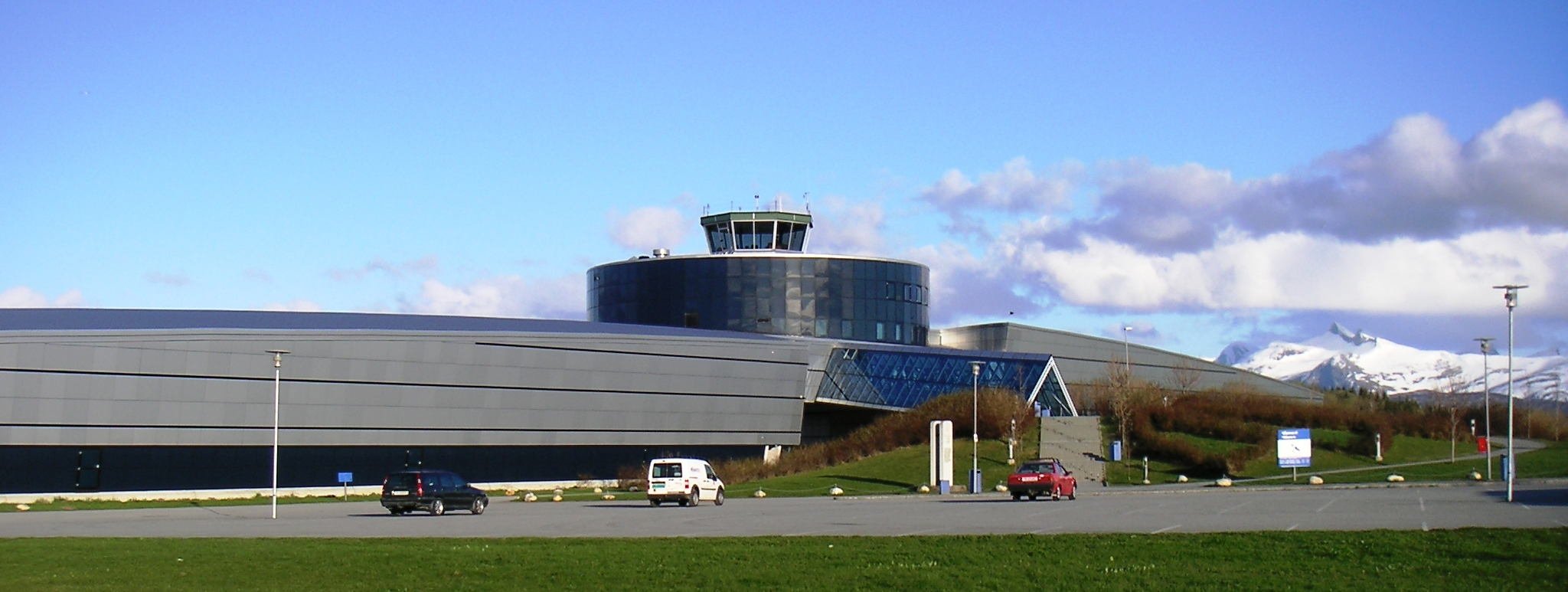
- Established: May 15, 1994
- Location: Bodø, Norway
- Coordinates: 67.2764°N 14.41281°E
- Type: Aviation museum
- Director: Hanne Kristin Jakhelln
- Architect: Per Morten Wik at Boarch
- Parking: On site
- Website: http://luftfartsmuseum.no/

The Norwegian Aviation Museum (Norwegian: Norsk luftfartsmuseum) was opened by King Harald V on May 15, 1994. It is the Norwegian national museum of aviation and also the largest aviation museum in the Nordic countries, covering around 10,000 square metres (110,000 sq ft). Situated in the town of Bodø, in Bodø Municipality in Nordland county, the building is shaped like a huge propeller and contains both civilian and military aircraft.

== Exhibits and collections ==
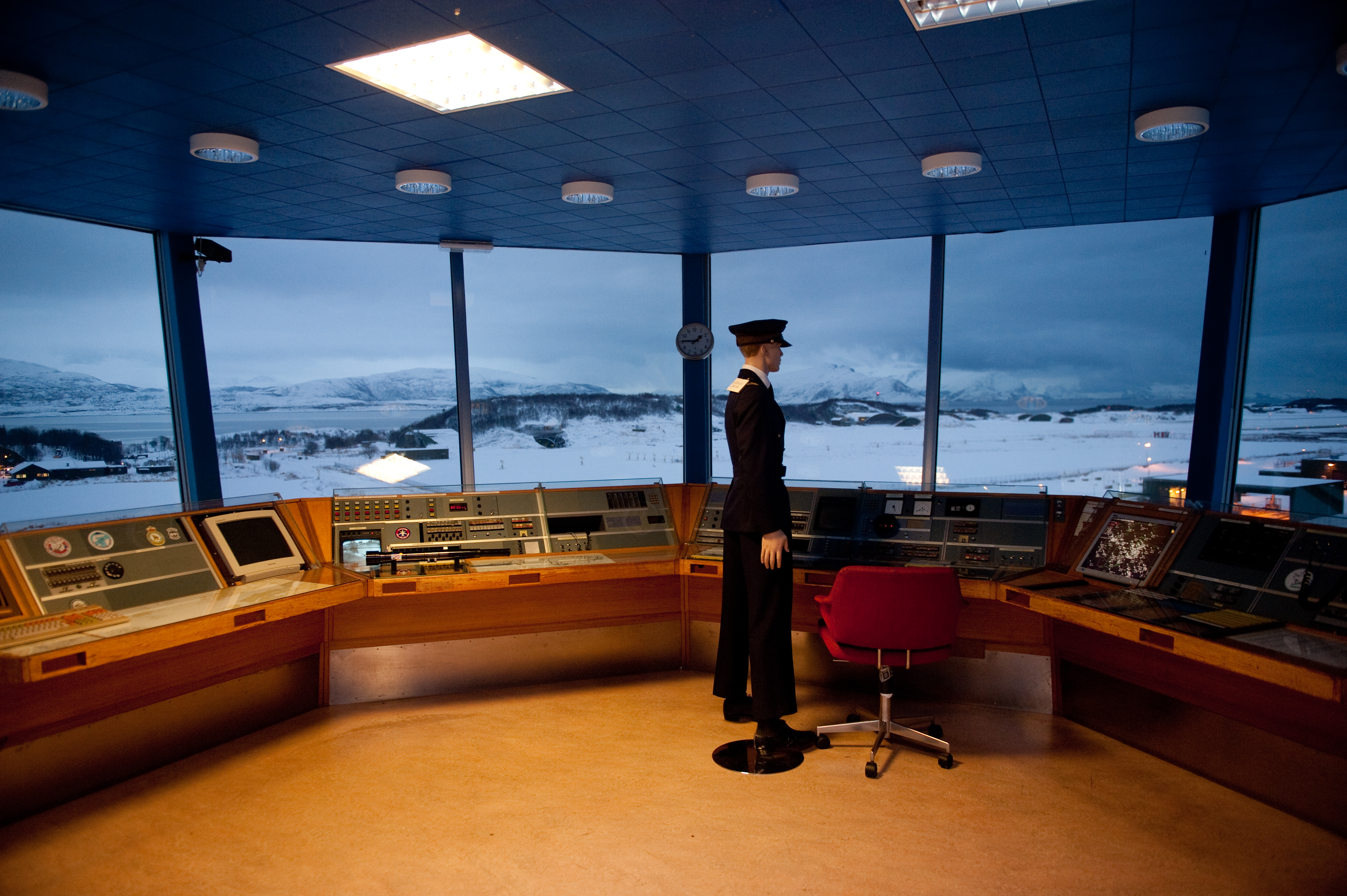
Former Bodø control tower

The exhibits of the Norwegian Aviation museum tell the story of aviation with a focus on the Norwegian history, from the early beginning all the way to the present time. The collection is divided into a military section and a civil section.

=== Military aircraft on display ===
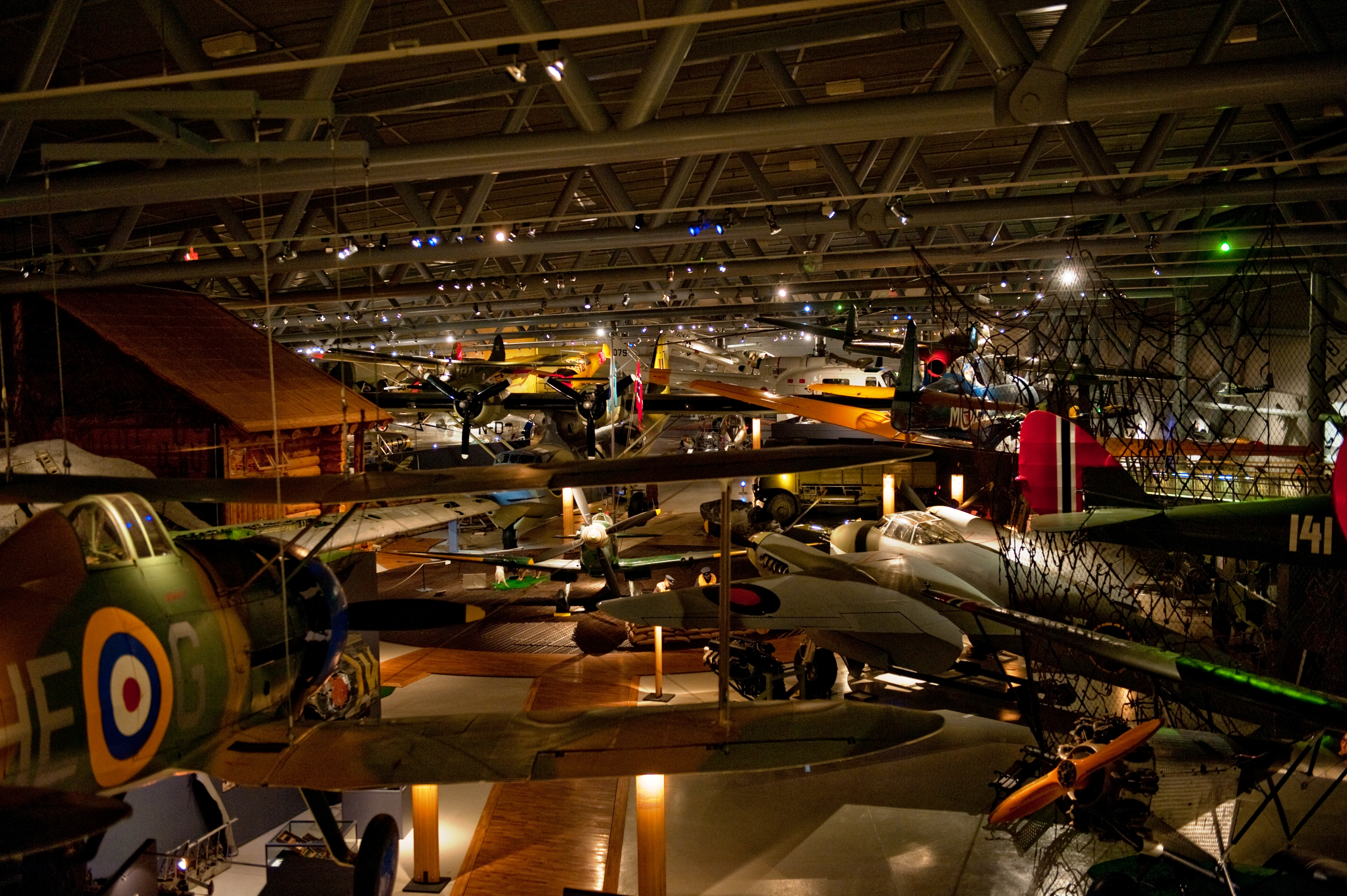
Inside the military part of the Norwegian Aviation Museum

- Avro 504K Dyak – British trainer aircraft
- Bell UH-1B Iroquois - 64-14079/079 - American medium heavy tactical transport helicopter
- Canadair CF-104 Starfighter - 104802 (earlier 12801) - Canadian interceptor aircraft
- Cessna L-19A/O-1A Bird Dog - 50-1712 - American observation aircraft
- Cessna T-37B Tweet - 57-2247 - American trainer aircraft
- Consolidated PBY-5A Catalina - BU 46645 - American Maritime patrol and search-and-rescue aircraft
- De Havilland DH.82 Tiger Moth - 88210 - British trainer aircraft
- De Havilland DH.98 Mosquito - British multirole combat aircraft
- De Havilland DH.100 Vampire - V0184 - British fighter aircraft
- Fairchild PT-19 Cornell - American trainer aircraft
- Focke-Wulf Fw 190 A-3/U3 - NR 2219/Black 3 - German Ground attack aircraft
- Fokker C.V-D - 349 - Dutch aerial reconnaissance and light bomber aircraft
- Gloster Gladiator II - N5641 - British fighter aircraft
- Hawker Hurricane Mk II (Fiberglass replica) - British fighter aircraft
- Junkers Ju 88 A-4 (Displayed as crashed) - 4D+AM - German multirole combat aircraft
- Kjeller F.F.9 Kaje I - 66 - Norwegian trainer aircraft
- Lockheed U-2 - 56-6953 - American reconnaissance aircraft
- Messerschmitt Bf-109 G-2/R6 «Yellow 3» 14649
- North American F-86F Sabre - 53-1206 - American fighter aircraft
- North American T-6/J Harvard - 52-8570 - American trainer aircraft
- Northrop F-5A Freedom Fighter - tail no. 134 - American fighter aircraft
- Northrop RF-5A(G) Freedom Fighter - tail no. 102 - American Aerial reconnaissance aircraft
- Petlyakov Pe-2FT (Cockpit section displayed) - 16/141 - Soviet light bomber aircraft
- Piper L-18C Super Cub - 53-4835 - American light aerial reconnaissance aircraft
- Republic F-84G Thunderjet - 52-8465 - American fighter-bomber aircraft
- Republic RF-84F Thunderflash - 51-17047 - American aerial reconnaissance aircraft
- SAAB 91B-2 Safir - 91-337 - Swedish trainer aircraft
- Supermarine Spitfire LF.Mk.IXe - MH350 - British fighter aircraft
- Westland Lynx (Lynx Mk.86)

=== Civil aircraft on display ===
- North American Rockwell 1121 Jet Commander (on display outside) - American Business jet

== Location debate controversy ==
For decades the decision on where to locate the Norwegian national Aviation Museum sparked heated discussions. For a long time the aviation community working close to the Norwegian Armed Forces Aircraft Collection at Gardermoen and the aviation community in Bodø debated intensely against each other in order to persuade politicians to locate the museum at their home turf. On 31 March 1992 the Norwegian parliament, the Storting, decided to build the museum in Bodø.

== Location ==
The Norwegian aviation museum is situated in Bodø, Northern Norway. The museum is straddled across the street of 'Olav V gate'. When travelling by car from the nearby Bodø Airport in the direction of Fauske you will pass under the museum. The museum is located roughly 1.5 kilometres (0.93 mi) from the town centre. Nearby points of interest are Bodø Spektrum (a sports complex with water park) and the shopping centre of City Nord.

== See also ==
- List of aerospace museums
