= Battle of Fornebu =

Engagement that occurred during the April 1940 German invasion of Norway

- Part of the Norwegian campaign in World War II
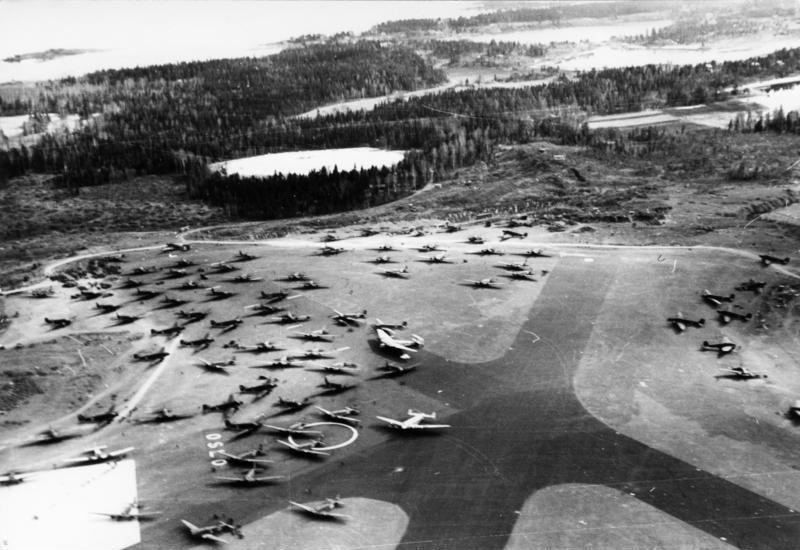
- Fornebu after the Luftwaffe had taken over the field
Date	9 April 1940
Location	Fornebu, Norway 59°53′N 010°37′E
Result	German victory

Belligerents
Norway	Germany

Commanders and leaders
(Norway) Erling Munthe-Dahl	(Nazi Germany) Nikolaus von Falkenhorst

Strength
7 Gloster Gladiator fighter planes	70–80 planes (first wave)

Casualties and losses
1 plane shot down	4 planes shot down
- Notes: All the Norwegian planes eventually ran out of gas and landed.

The Battle of Fornebu was an engagement that occurred on 9 April 1940 during Operation Weserübung when the Germans launched an assault on Oslo, the capital of Norway. Seven fighter planes from the vastly outnumbered Norwegian Army Air Service took to the skies to engage the German forces. The Norwegians shot down four German planes for the loss of one their own before the defenders were forced to land after their aircraft ran low on fuel.

== Background ==
In the morning hours of 9 April, a German fleet led by the cruiser Blücher had been dispatched up the Oslofjord to begin the German invasion of Norway, with the objective of seizing the Norwegian capital of Oslo and capturing King Haakon VII and his government. The fleet was engaged in the fjord by Oscarsborg Fortress, an aging coastal installation near Drøbak, that had been relegated to training coastal artillery servicemen, leading the Germans to disregard its defensive value. The loss of the German flagship, which carried most of the troops and Gestapo agents intended to occupy Oslo, delayed the German occupation long enough for King Haakon VII and his government to escape from the capital.

In the days and weeks before the German invasion, the Luftwaffe had made several reconnaissance flights over the Norwegian capital. The Norwegians had dispatched fighters to intercept them, but the Gloster Gladiators were not able to catch up with the newer and faster German planes.

== Battle ==
At 05:00 the Norwegian fighters were put on high alert after an earlier flyover from an unidentified aircraft. The plane of Second Lieutenant (Fenrik) Finn Thorsager was the first to take off, but his wingman Lt. Arve Braathen had engine trouble, leaving Thorsager in the only Norwegian airborne fighter for around 30 minutes.

At 07:06 five Gloster Gladiators were combat ready. They were later joined by two additional planes. At this point, the German airborne invasion consisted of 70-80 planes, mainly Messerschmitt Bf 110s and Heinkel He 111s. During the battle, four German planes are shot down; two He 111s, one Bf 110 and one additional Messerschmitt fighter. One Norwegian fighter was shot down by the Germans, but all Gloster Gladiators eventually ran low on fuel, and landed in various places around Oslo.

== Aftermath ==
Fornebu Airport was originally supposed to be secured by paratroops an hour before the first troops were flown in, but the initial force became lost in the fog and did not arrive. Regardless, the airfield was not heavily defended and the German soldiers who did arrive captured it promptly. The ground personnel of the Norwegian Army Air Service soon ran out of ammunition for their anti-aircraft machine guns as well; in the general confusion and focus on readying the fighters for action, no one had the presence of mind or the time to issue small-arms ammunition for the personal weapons of the ground personnel. Ground resistance at Fornebu Airport came to an end, with the Germans' only loss being a single Ju 52. Norwegian attempts to mount a counter-attack were half-hearted and effectively came to nothing. On learning of this, Oslo itself was declared an open city and soon fully surrendered.

All the Norwegian pilots were eventually sent to the United Kingdom and later to Little Norway in Canada joining up with the Norwegian force-in-exile and what eventually became the Royal Norwegian Air Force.

== See also ==
- List of Norwegian military equipment of World War II
- List of German military equipment of World War II
