= HafenCity University Hamburg =

University in Germany

- HafenCity Universität Hamburg
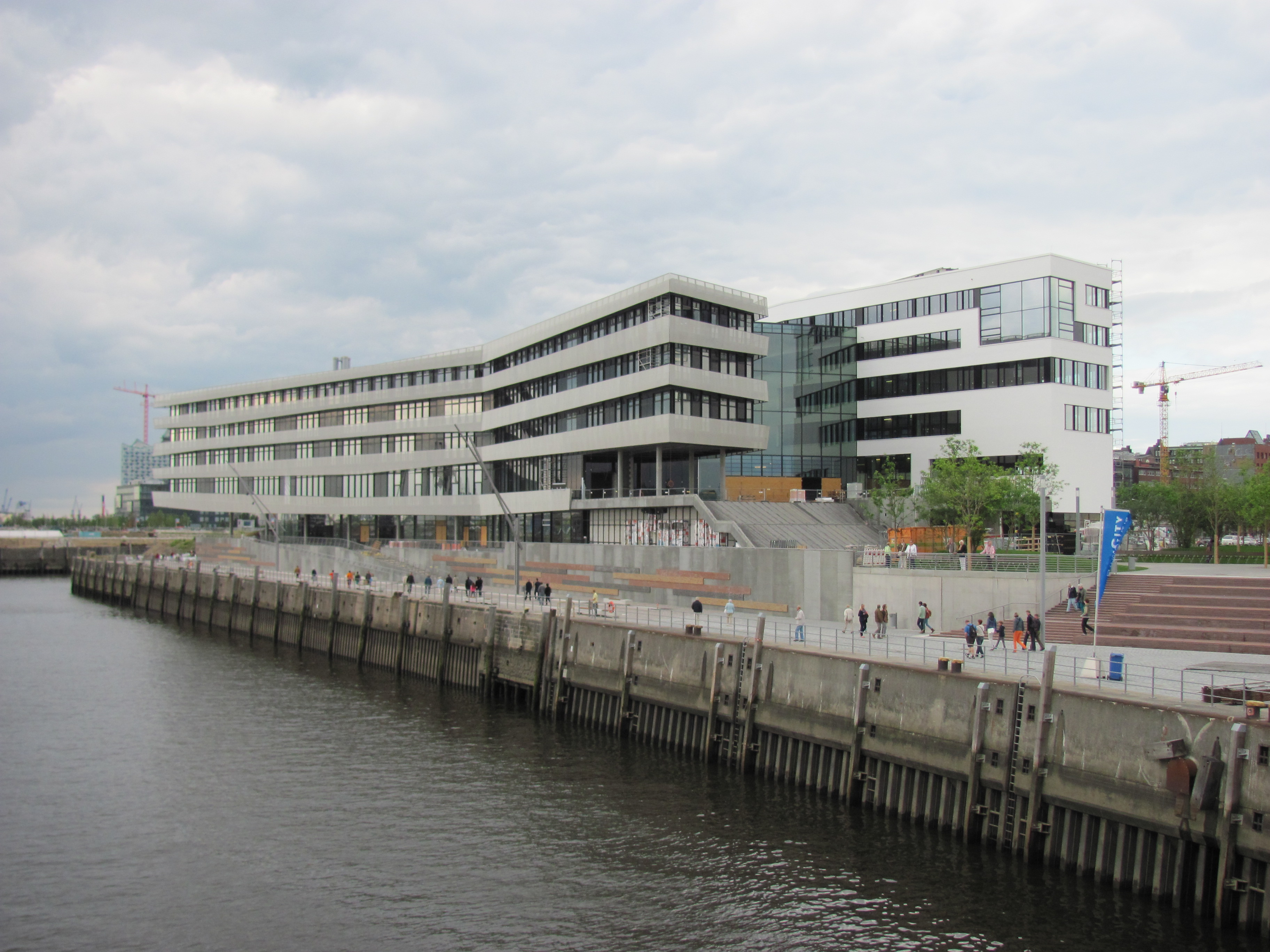
- HafenCity Universität Hamburg August 2013
- Type: Public
- Established: 2006; 20 years ago
- President: Jörg Müller-Lietzkow
- Location: Hamburg, Germany
- Campus: Urban
- Website: http://www.hcu-hamburg.de/

The HafenCity University Hamburg (German: HafenCity Universität Hamburg, abbreviated HCU) — also known as the University Of The Built Environment And Metropolitan Development — is a public university in Hamburg, Germany which is focused on architecture, civil engineering and urban planning courses.

The university's name refers to its location in Hamburg's HafenCity, the site of an urban regeneration project, where the old port warehouses of Hamburg are being replaced with offices, hotels, shops, official buildings, and residential areas.

The name of this university, which was founded in 2006, refers to the location of the university building in the Hamburg district of HafenCity, currently the largest inner-city construction site in Europe, and thus also makes reference to its thematic field of activity. The courses, which had been spread over different locations in the districts of Uhlenhorst (Mundsburg) and Winterhude (City Nord) since the university was founded, moved into the new building on Überseeallee on April 1, 2014.

== History ==
HafenCity University Hamburg (HCU) was established on January 1, 2006, by the Free and Hanseatic City of Hamburg. This institution emerged from the consolidation of four departments across three Hamburg universities, aiming to centralize disciplines related to the built environment and metropolitan development.

The university's name references its location in the HafenCity district, a significant urban development area in Hamburg. Initially, HCU's programs were dispersed across various sites in the Uhlenhorst and Winterhude districts. On April 1, 2014, these programs were unified under one roof with the inauguration of a new campus building on Überseeallee in HafenCity.

== Courses ==
HafenCity University Hamburg (HCU) offers a range of bachelor's and master's degree programs focused on the built environment and metropolitan development. These programs are designed to address the complexities of urbanization and sustainable city planning.

=== Bachelor's degree programs ===
- Architecture This program emphasizes the design and planning of buildings and structures, integrating aesthetic, functional, and technical aspects.
- Civil Engineering Students learn about the planning, construction, and maintenance of infrastructure projects, including roads, bridges, and water systems.
- Geodesy and Geoinformatics This field involves the measurement and representation of the Earth's surface, combining surveying techniques with geospatial data analysis.
- Urban Planning The program focuses on the development and design of urban spaces, considering social, economic, and environmental factors.
- Urban Design and Resource Efficiency in Architecture and Planning (REAP) are also available as interdisciplinary master's degrees.

=== Master's Degree Programs ===
- Architecture: Advanced studies in architectural design, theory, and practice.
- Civil Engineering: Focused on complex engineering projects and innovative construction techniques.
- Geodesy and Geoinformatics: Specialization in areas such as hydrography, remote sensing, and geospatial data management.
- Urban Planning: Advanced concepts in urban development, policy planning, and sustainable city design.
- Urban Design: An interdisciplinary program addressing the challenges of urban development and public space design.
- Resource Efficiency in Architecture and Planning (REAP): This program focuses on sustainable architectural practices and efficient resource management in urban planning.

== Research ==
HafenCity University Hamburg (HCU) engages in interdisciplinary research focused on urban planning, architecture, civil engineering, cultural and social urban studies, and geomatics.

CityScienceLab

A notable research initiative at HCU is the CityScienceLab, established in collaboration with the MIT Media Lab. This lab investigates urban challenges in the context of digitalization, working with partners from civil society, politics, economy, and science. It employs data-based technologies to strengthen the resilience of urban spaces and develops digital tools to visualize and simulate urban developments, aiding decision-making processes.

Collaborative Research

HCU researchers collaborate with various institutions to address complex urban issues. For example, the university is involved in the Excellence Cluster "Climate, Climatic Change, and Society" (CLICCS), which explores climate dynamics and societal responses.

== See also ==
- Living lab (MIT City Science lab)
