= Christian Farenholtz =

German architect (1923–2021)

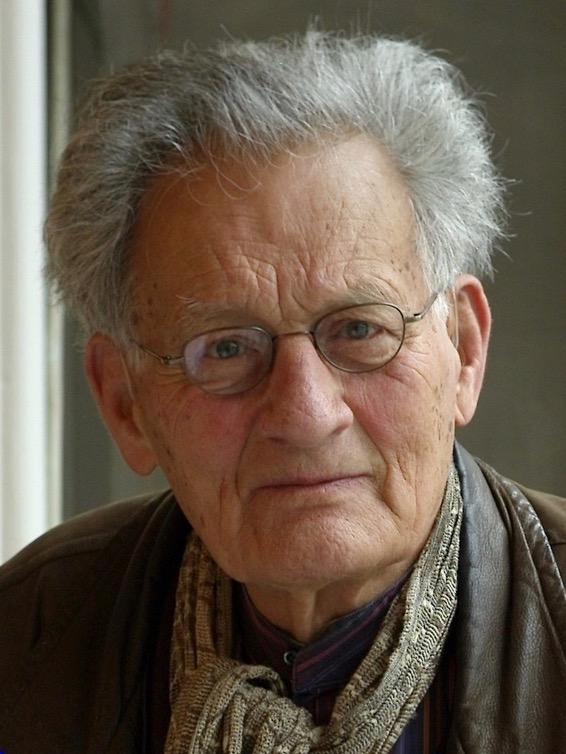
- Farenholtz in 2012
- Born: February 27, 1923; Magdeburg, Germany
- Died: May 3, 2021 (aged 98)
- Occupation: Architect

Christian Farenholtz (February 27, 1923 – May 3, 2021) was a German architect, urban planner and university teacher.

== Life ==
Farenholtz was born in 1923 as a merchant's son in Magdeburg. He had five children from his first marriage and his second marriage was to Sabine Rheinhold. He earned a Ph.D. from TU Braunschweig in 1956.

== Effect ==
In his work at the State Planning Office Hamburg from 1954 to 1965, he called for a political view of planning and attached great importance to the mediation and participation of people in planning processes. During this time, he worked on two projects, Neu Altona and City Nord, in which he expressed his basic beliefs in urban development and urban planning. Neu Altona was about reconstruction planning. He showed a move away from closed, narrow blocks and instead advocated an open arrangement of the buildings with connecting green spaces between the houses. This resulted in residential quarters that still have quality today. As part of the planning for City Nord, a new location for individually designed administration buildings was created.

From 1965 to 1973, Farenholtz was Building Mayor in Stuttgart. He was also a member of the German Council for Urban Development and played a major role in the development of the StBauFG, which later found its way into the Building Code (BauGB). The Planspiel was introduced as a planning instrument in connection with the Urban Development Promotion Act, thus enabling everyone involved to participate in the planning.

From 1973 to 1980, he was in Hamburg at GEWOS (Institute for Urban, Regional and Housing Research). With his help Urban Development Plans for Hameln, Itzehoe and Osnabrück were created. In addition, thorough housing market analyzes and social studies as well as the evaluation of the StBauFG were carried out.

From 1980, Farenholtz was professor at the Technical University of Hamburg-Harburg (TUHH) and worked on the development of the Urban Development / Urban Planning course. He retired in 1988.

He then provided political advice for the federal, state and local governments and, from 1990, was also involved in the harmonization of building law in the area of the former GDR.
