= Kjeller Flyfabrikk =

Norwegian military aircraft manufacturer

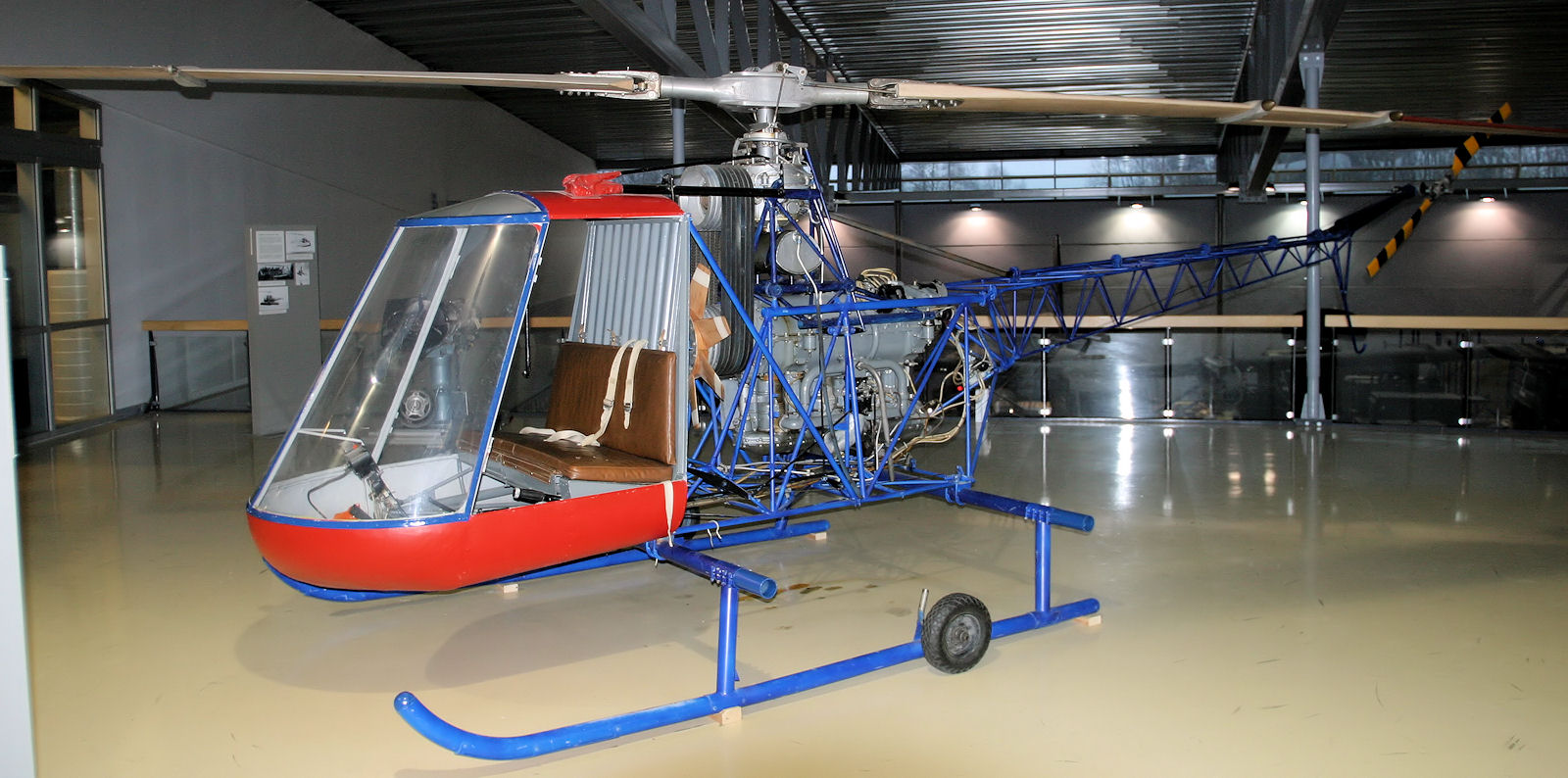
A PK X-1 experimental helicopter, part of the Norwegian Armed Forces Aircraft Collection

Kjeller Flyfabrikk (English: Kjeller Aircraft Factory), (Note: Contraction of Kjeller Flyvemaskinsfabrik (English: Kjeller Flying Machine Factory)) also known as the Hærens Flyfabrikk, was a Norwegian manufacturer of military aircraft. It was formally established in 1915, but was active from 1912. The factory was owned by the Norwegian government under the management of the Norwegian Army Air Service. It was located at Kjeller Airport. It mainly produced various foreign aircraft under license, but also developed its own aircraft types.

== Aircraft produced at Kjeller Flyfabrikk ==
Aircraft name	Years built	No. built	Type	Remarks
F.F. 6	1921	1	Fighter
F.F. 7 Hauk	1923–1924	14	Fighter	License-built Hannover CL.V
F.F. 8 Make	1923–1924	14	Reconnaissance floatplane	License-built Hansa-Brandenburg W.33
F.F.9 Kaje	1921–1926	19	Trainer/ Reconnaissance	Kaje I, Kaje II and Kaje III
Fokker C.V	1929–1939	42	Light bomber/ Reconnaissance	License-built
Moth		10	Trainer	License-built
Tiger Moth	1932–1935	37	Trainer	License-built
PK X-1	1955	1	Helicopter	Prototype
PK X-2	1962	1	Helicopter	Prototype
