= Leiria (disambiguation) =

Leiria city and municipality in Portugal

Leiria may also refer to:

== Places ==
- Região de Leiria, an administrative division in western Portugal
- Leiria District, a district located in Portugal
- Castle of Leiria, a medieval castle in the civil parish of Leiria

== Sports ==
- Leiria Football Association, one of the 22 District Football Associations that are affiliated with the PFF
- U.D. Leiria, a Portuguese professional football club based in Leiria

== People ==
- Camila Leiria (born 1982), Brazilian sitting volleyball player
- Carlos Leiria (born 1983), Brazilian football coach
- Léomar Leiria (born 1971), Brazilian footballer
- Mário-Henrique Leiria (1923–1980), Portuguese surrealist poet
- Romário Leiria de Moura (born 1992), Brazilian footballer

== See also ==
- Leira (disambiguation)
