= Erling Munthe-Dahl =

Norwegian military officer

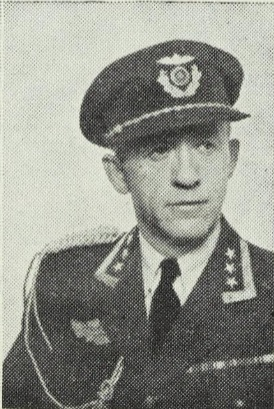
- Born: December 25, 1897; Kristiania, Sweden-Norway
- Died: February 26, 1996 (aged 98); Norway
- Burial place: Cemetery of Our Saviour, Oslo, Norway
- Military career
- Allegiance: Norway
- Branch: Norwegian Armed Forces; Norwegian Army Air Service; Royal Norwegian Air Force
- Service years: 1915–1962
- Rank: Officer; Pilot
- Conflicts: World War II: Battle of Fornebu
- Awards: War Medal; Defence Medal 1940–1945; Norwegian Military Journal's medal for answering a prize statement

Erling Munthe-Dahl was a Norwegian officer who was most notable as Jagervingen's commander at Fornebu Airport during the Norwegian campaign in 1940.

== Biography ==
=== Family ===
Erling Munthe-Dahl was the son of Jens Munthe-Dahl and Hanna Andersen. His father was a major in the Army's engineering weapons. Munthe-Dahl's first place of residence was Building 2, Briskebyveien, Kristiania.

=== Military Career before World War II ===
Erling Munthe-Dahl graduated in Autumn, 1915. He later graduated from the Norwegian Military Academy's upper department in 1918, and was then appointed first lieutenant in the Engineering Weapons. After this he was an inspection officer on the War School's engineering line. He then applied for admission to the Army Flight School, and was a student there from 1919 to 1920, before he was permanently employed in the same department from 1921. In 1921, Munthe-Dahl started at the Military College. From 1922 to 1926 he was ordered as head of the Northern Norway Aviation Department. In 1921, Munthe-Dahl started at the Military College. From 1922 to 1926 he was ordered as head of the Northern Norway Aviation Department, and he also took a military college degree in 1923.

With a special interest in radio communication, he graduated from the Royal Norwegian Navy's Radio School's "radio course" in 1924 with a 1st class certificate. In 1925, he graduated from the Supélec in France. After this, Munthe-Dahl became head teacher at the Army Flight School in 1926, and at the same time the Air Force's signal consultant. He held these positions until 1930. On July 1, 1932, Captain Munthe-Dahl was ordered as the first commander of the newly established Garrison Swing, in the Air Battalion. Munthe-Dahl had also served in several French air regiments.

The first article he wrote for the Norwegian Air Military Journal (NLMT) was published in 1926, on the subject of electrical installations in aircraft. The article used material from the French journal l'Aeroneutique as a source. Munthe-Dahl took over the editorial responsibility for NLMT in 1928 and wrote much of the content himself. Main topics had technical and tactical content.

From 1937 to 1939 was Munthe-Dahl Chief of Staff of the Army Air Force, and he was appointed chief of Jager Wing at Fornebu on October 20, 1939. Starring reason for the appointment was Munthe-Dahl's treatise "Oslo's air defenses confronted with a modern air attack." He received the Norsk Militært Tidsskrift's silver medal for this dissertation.

=== World War II ===
Captain Munthe-Dahl was Jagervingen's commander at Fornebu Airport during Nazi Germany's surprise attack on Norway between April 8 and 9 in 1940. Jagervingen's efforts delayed the development of the attack on Norway.

=== Prisoner of War ===
On January 24, 1942, Munthe-Dahl was arrested at the Grini detention camp, and held there as a prisoner until February 5, 1942. He was then transferred to the German camps Schokken, Grune, Oflag XXI-C and finally Luckenwalde, all the time with being labeled as prisoner number 29. He was a prisoner of war until the end of the peace in 1945.

=== Career after World War II ===
After World War II, Munthe-Dahl continued in the Royal Norwegian Air Force. From January 1, 1949, to January 1, 1952, Munthe-Dahl was chief adjutant to King Haakon VII. He became colonel and commander of the Luftforsvarets skolesenter Kjevik, in Kjevik. He ended his career in the Armed Forces in 1962, as Major General and Commander of Luftkommando Vestlandet (LKV), in the headquarters at Sola.
