= Harald Normann =

Norwegian military officer and non-fiction writer

- Born: 15 February 1893
- Died: 18 June 1978 (aged 85)
- Occupation: Norwegian military

Harald Normann (15 February 1893 – 18 June 1978) was a Norwegian military officer and non-fiction writer. He was born in Steinkjer. From 1936 he was in command of the Norwegian Army Air Service's "jageving", and from 1939 he chaired the flying school at Kjeller. Among his books are Normalflyvning og snittflyvning from 1930, Luftkamp from 1934, Vollgraven from 1955, and Hvordan gikk det til? from 1962.
