= Leira =

Leira may refer to:

== Places ==
=== Norway ===
- Leira (river), a river in Innlandet and Akershus counties
- Leira or Leiren, a village in Grane municipality, Nordland county
- Leira, Innlandet, a village in Nord-Aurdal municipality, Innlandet county
- Leira, Trøndelag, a village in Indre Fosen municipality, Trøndelag county
- Leira, Ørsta, a village in Ørsta municipality, Møre og Romsdal county

=== Spain ===
- Leira (river in Galicia), a river in Galicia, Spain

== Other ==
- Leira (Forgotten Realms), fictional goddess of the Forgotten Realms
- Leira (Loudspeaker), concrete speaker produced by Rauna of Sweden

== See also ==
- Leiria, a city and municipality in Portugal
