= Kjeller F.F.9 Kaje =

F.F.9 Kaje
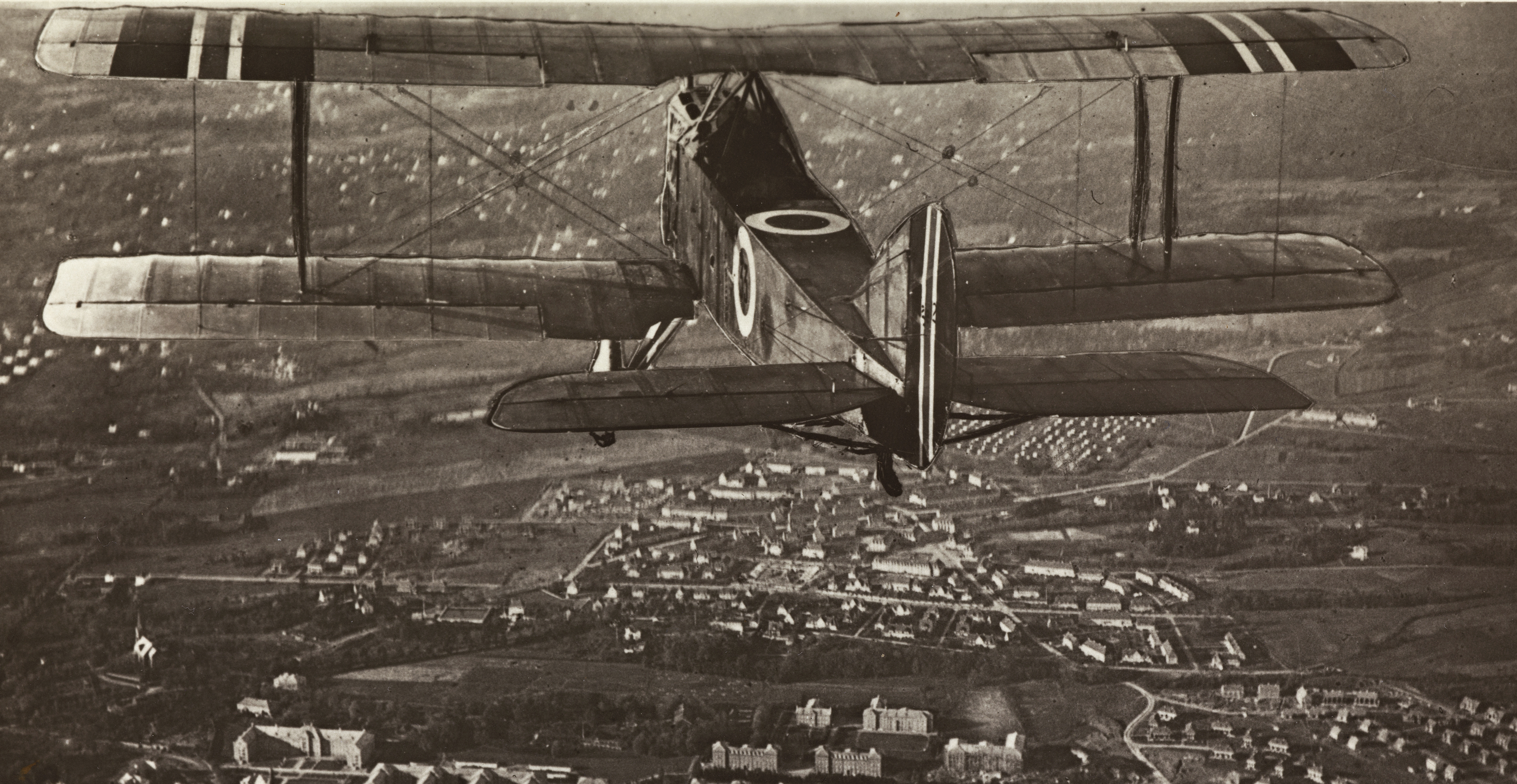
- F.F.9 Kaje I

General information
- Type: Trainer & Reconnaissance
- National origin: Norway
- Manufacturer: Kjeller Flyvemaskinsfabrik
- Number built: 19

The FF9 Kaje was a Norwegian trainer aircraft, designed and built by the Norwegian Army Air Service's aircraft manufacturer Kjeller Flyfabrikk.

== Design and development ==
Work on the Kaje started in 1921. It was built in three series: the Kaje I of which ten were built in 1921 and 1922, the Kaje II of which four were built in 1925 and five Kaje III in 1926. The models differed slightly in wing profile, wingspan and rudder surfaces, based on experience with the previous model.

The Kaje was a well built aircraft, constructed primarily of wood with fabric covering, with a good engine, but it had bad spin characteristics.

== Operational history ==
Although primarily used as a training plane and for reconnaissance, the aircraft could also carry arms and was tested with radio equipment.

The aircraft was in use until the early 1930s.

== Variants ==
Kaje I
Ten built.
Kaje II
Four built.
Kaje III
Five built.

== Operators ==
Norway

- Norwegian Army Air Service

== Specifications (Kaje III) ==
General characteristics

- Crew: two
- Length: 8.4 m (27 ft 7 in)
- Wingspan: 9.5 m (31 ft 2 in)
- Powerplant: 1 × Marabini 6-cyl. water-cooled in-line piston engine, 89 kW (120 hp) (license built Mercedes D.II)

Performance

- Maximum speed: 132 km/h (82 mph, 71 kn)
- Range: 375 km (233 mi, 202 nmi)
- Service ceiling: 3,200 m (10,500 ft)
