= Marabini =

Marabini is a surname. Notable people with the surname include:

- Mark Marabini (1964–2020), Zimbabwean athlete
- Paolo Marabini, Italian Formula One engineer
