= Leira (river) =

River in Norway

Coordinates: 59.9381°N 11.0732°E

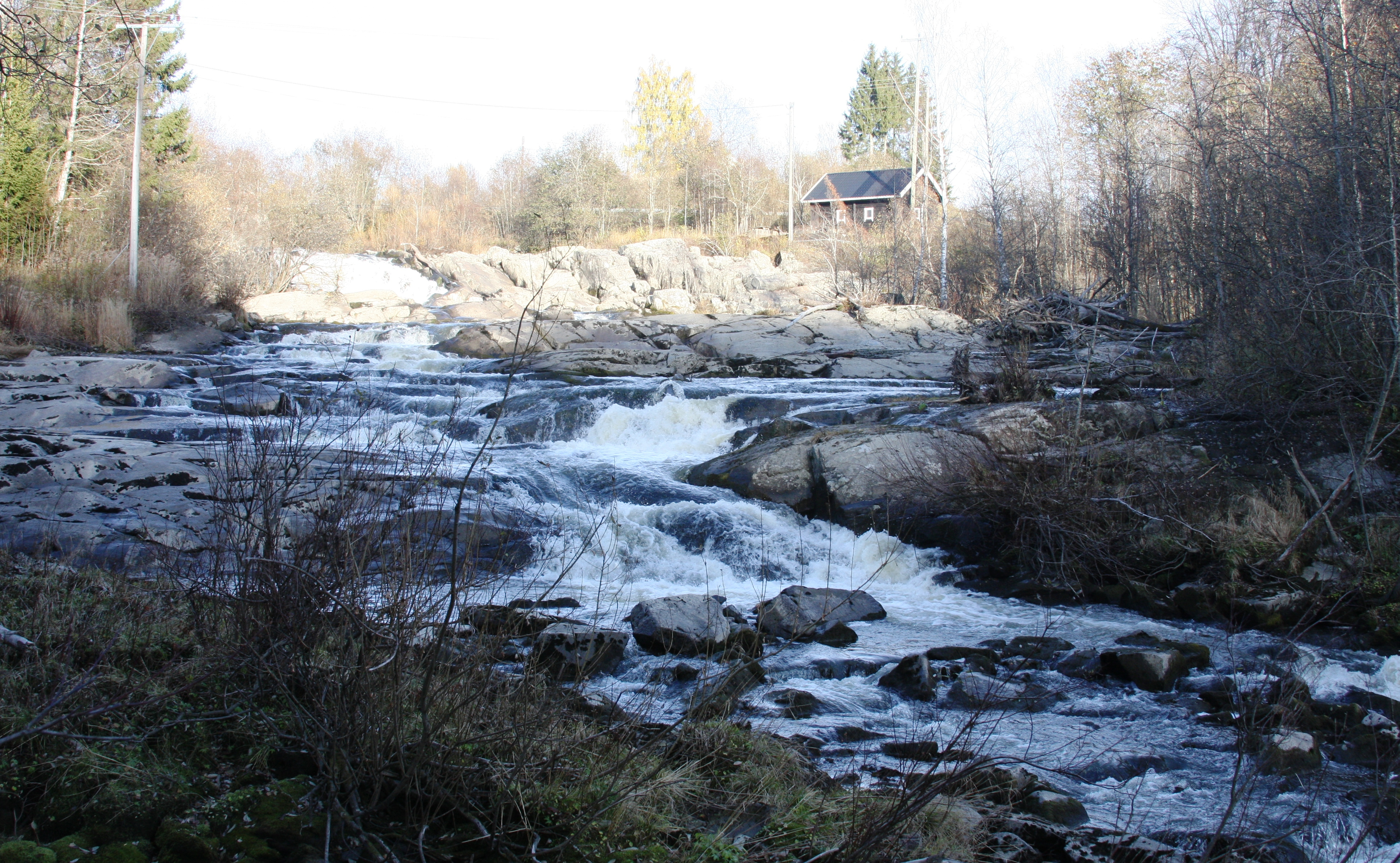
Leira at Kråkfoss

Leira is a river in Innlandet and Akershus, Norway. It comes from Leirsjøen, 320 metres (1,050 ft) above sea level, in Romeriksåsene between Hadeland and Romerike, in Lunner municipality in Innlandet. From here, it runs east through the countryside to Nannestad municipality in Akershus, and exits in Stråtjern, 299 metres (981 ft) above sea level). It comes down to Romerikssletten westwards, until Maura and swings southwest, until it joins the Rotua and moves southeast and then southwards. Southwest of Gardermoen it runs through land between Nannestad and Ullensaker, along Gjerdrum and Ullensaker, and Gjerdrum and Sørum municipalities. Northeast of Hekseberget it joins the Gjermåa, and at the same time runs into Skedsmo municipality. Later, it passes through Frogner and Leirsund, runs into a meander over the flat lands around Lillestrøm, and exits into the Nitelva. It ends in the land between Skedsmo and Fet.

== The name ==
The name is derived from leire 'clay'. Leira is a common name of rivers many places in Norway.
