= Nitelva =

River in Akershus, Norway

Coordinates: 59°56′N 11°04′E

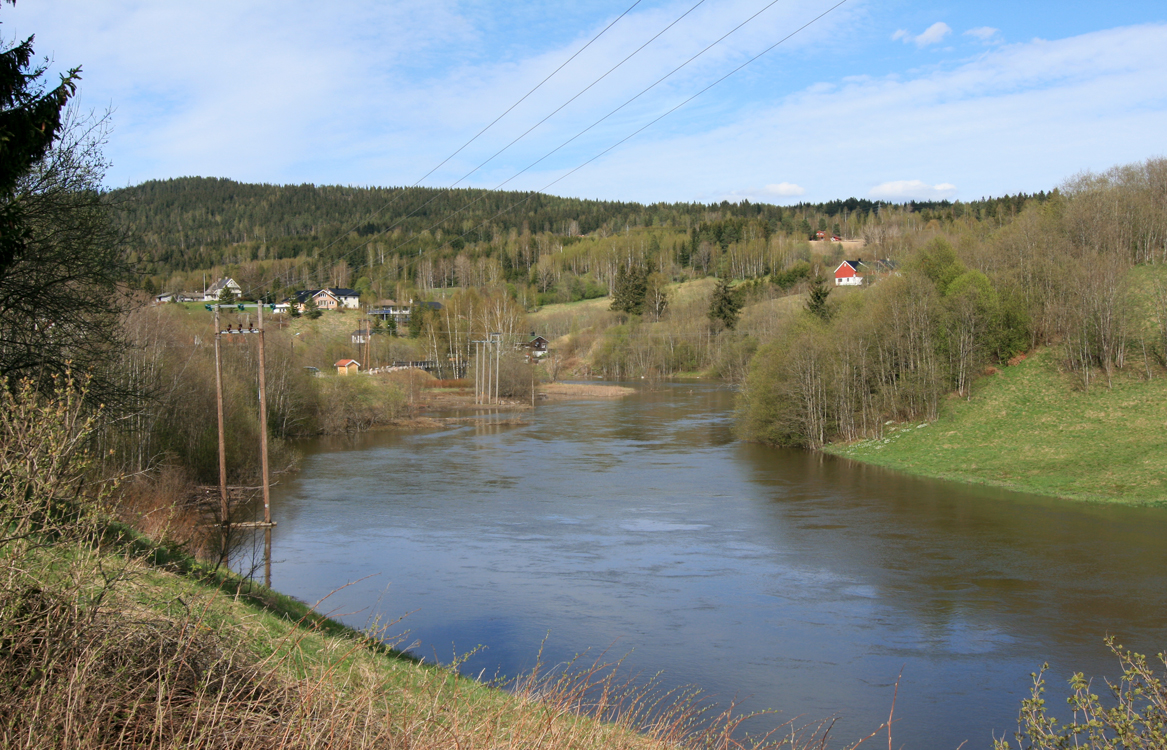
Nitelva at Nittedal

Nitelva is a river that rises at Grua and flows to Harestuvatnet in the southern part of Lunner municipality in Akershus. The river then flows southwards and ends at Øyeren. The river has at this point run for around 37 kilometres (23 mi) and has dropped around 30 metres (98 ft). The river is part of the Oslomarkavassdragene.

The northern part of Nitelva runs between Hakadal and is called Hakadalselva. The journey to Øyeren begins with rapids, before slowing to a broad meandering river through Nittedal. The last kilometres of the river run through Lillestrøm and Rælingen municipalities, first as a scenic part of Lillestrøm city and Øvre Rælingen with roads on both banks, passing through an industrialised area before ending at the delta in the north of Øyeren in Rælingen. Nitelva and its banks make up a varied and fertile belt through forests, agricultural landscapes and buildings.

The river was originally named Nitja. The meaning of the name is unknown, but it may come from the word net, in the sense of fishing net. It may also come from the verb hnita, which means "to clash" (meaning waves that clash together). The river is an important part of the local environment, and the watercourse has been used for timber mills, power, and factories. Many places along the Nitelva have remains of these activities, and their influence is still seen in place names.

The river is well known for sports fishing. Up until Rotnesfossen can be found many of Norway's freshwater fish, and 21 species are recorded. Among these are northern pike, zander, perch and carp. To the north of the watercourse can also be found brown trout. Along the river, one can also find a rich and varied animal, bird and plant life, and it has an important ecological function as a habitat and dispersal corridor for several species. Here you can experience both the dense spruce forests, lush deciduous forests, marshes, flower beds, juncus and water plants. The animal and bird species along the river include beaver, grey heron and deer. Because of its biological diversity, Nitelva is a protected waterway, and in the lower part of the river, there are two nature reserves; Sørumsneset and Nordre Øyeren nature reserve.
