= City Nord =

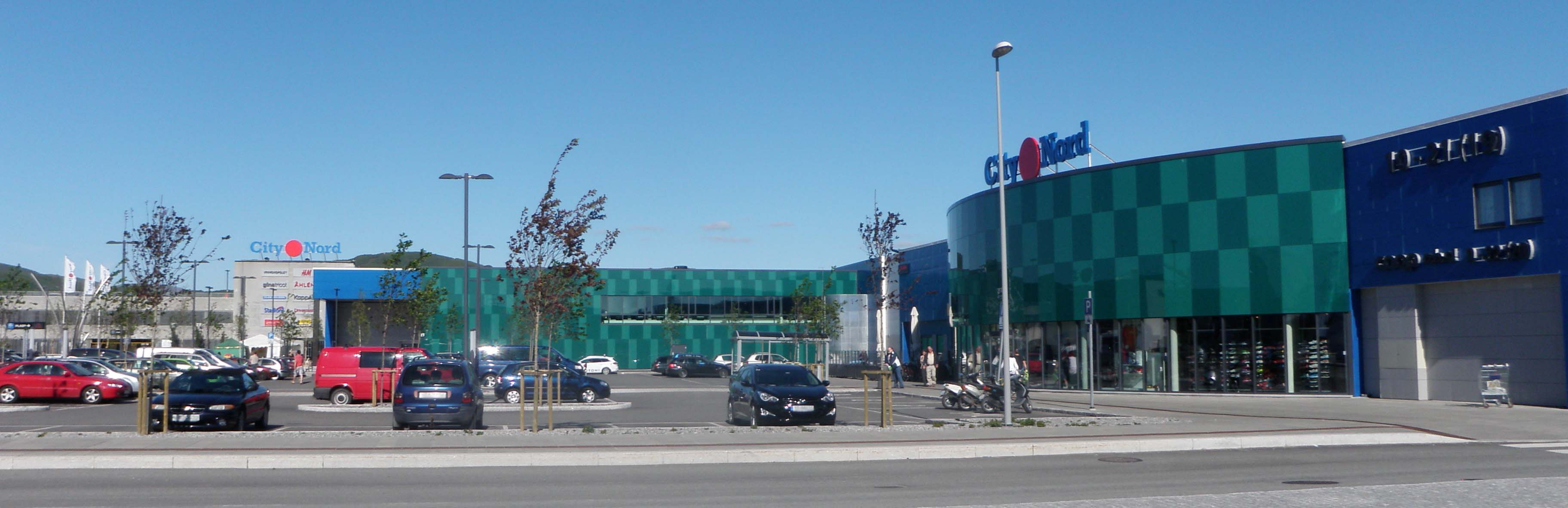
- City Nord in July 2012
- Location: Bodø, Nordland, Norway
- Coordinates: 67.2771°N 14.4227°E
- Opened: 1994
- Num. of stores: 74
- Floor area: 70,000 square meters (750,000 sq ft)
- Floors: 2
- Website: www.citynord.no

City Nord is a shopping center located at Stormyra in the town of Bodø in Bodø Municipality, Nordland county, Norway. Measuring 70,000 square meters (750,000 sq ft) and with more than 100 stores, it is the largest shopping center in Northern Norway. The shopping center opened in 1994 and has been expanded several times, first in 2008. The center suffered minor damage in a fire in December 2008.

In 2010–11, the center was expanded from 18,000 square meters (190,000 sq ft) to 40,000 square meters (430,000 sq ft) at a cost of 550 million kr, leading to concerns that the center might out-compete shops in the center of Bodø. These fears appeared to be allayed by early 2012, with the trade balance in the town evening out. The expanded center was opened on 10 November 2011 by the mayor of Bodø, Ole-Henrik Hjartøy, and the CEO of Coop Nordland, Lars Arve Jakobsen. The owner bought three surrounding lots for 65 million kr in 2013 and planned to expand the shopping center to between 63,000 square meters (680,000 sq ft) and 64,000 square meters (690,000 sq ft), with construction starting in March 2014 and estimated to be completed before the Christmas shopping season of 2015. The cost of the renewed expansion is estimated by Coop Nordland at 440 million kr. By the completion of the 2014–2015 expansion, City Nord was expected to be among the ten largest shopping centers in Norway. In 2014, City Nord management announced that by November 2015, the mall would measure 65,000 square meters (700,000 sq ft), equalling the size of Jekta Storsenter. City Nord is aimed at a customer base from both Bodø and the rest of the Salten region of Nordland.

City Nord has a 18,000 square meters (190,000 sq ft) multi-storey car park, with capacity in excess of 800 cars.
