= Fokker C.V =

Bomber aircraft in the Netherlands Air Force

C.V, C.VI, and C.IX
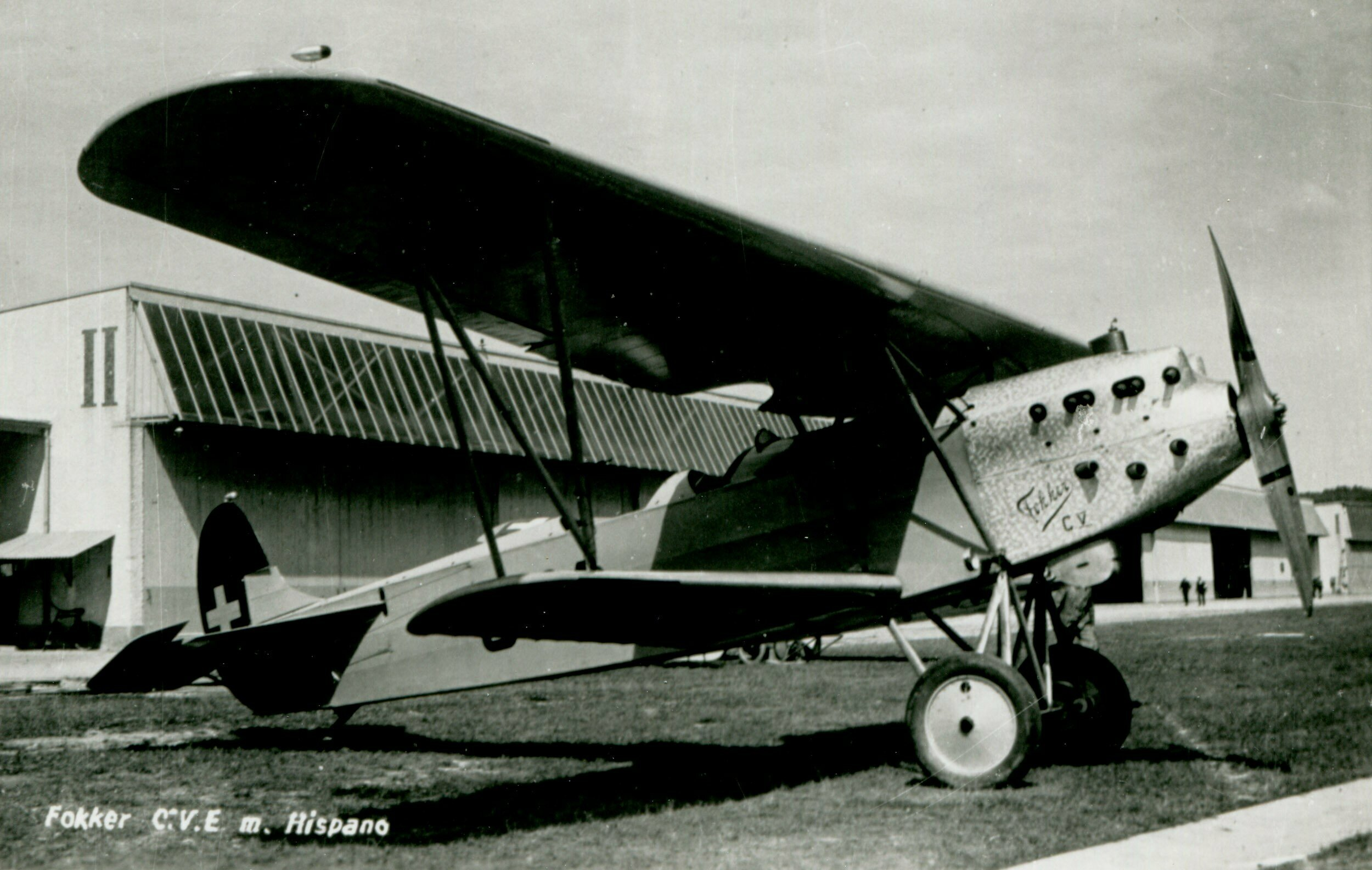
- Swiss Fokker C.V-E

General information
- Type: Light reconnaissance, bomber aircraft
- Manufacturer: Fokker
- Primary users: Royal Netherlands Air Force Regia Aeronautica; Norwegian Army Air Service; Finnish Air Force
- Number built: C.VI: 33; C.V-B: 18; C.V-C: 16; C.V-D: 212; C.V-E: 327; Ro.1 and Ro.1-bis: 349; Altogether: 955

History
- Introduction date: 1924

The Fokker C.V was a Dutch light reconnaissance and bomber biplane aircraft manufactured by Fokker. It was designed by Anthony Fokker and the series manufacture began in 1924 at Fokker in Amsterdam.

== Development ==
The C.V was constructed in the early 1920s by Anthony Fokker. The aircraft was intended as a two-seat reconnaissance and bomber aircraft. When shown to the public in 1924, it was offered in a variety of versions; the customer could choose from five different wing configurations (which varied in wing span). The radial engines could provide between 336–723 kW (451–970 hp). The landing gear could be changed from wheels to pontoons. The aircraft became an export success for Fokker, it was sold and/or license manufactured in Bolivia, China, Denmark, Finland, Hungary, Italy, Japan, the Netherlands, Norway, Switzerland, the Soviet Union and the US. Sweden purchased two different versions to use as models for their license manufacturing of the reconnaissance version S 6 and a fighter version J 3.

== Operational history ==
=== Finland ===
The Finnish Air Force used both C.V-Ds and C.V-Es. One C.V-E was purchased in 1927, with delivery 20 September, and a further 13 were purchased on 17 March 1934, arriving in the winter of 1935. During the Winter War, Sweden donated three more C.V-Es. Two C.V-Ds were also flown from Norway to Finland at the closing stages of the Norwegian Campaign. These were interned and turned over to the FAF. The aircraft were used as reconnaissance and light bomber aircraft between 20 September 1927 and 14 February 1945. During the Winter War, the Finnish C.Vs flew 151 reconnaissance and harassment bombing sorties without suffering any losses. The Continuation War saw the C.Vs flying an unknown number of sorties and suffering one aircraft loss.

Type	Number	Notes
C.V-E	1	Bristol Jupiter engine; FO-39
C.V-E	13	Pegasus engine; FO-65 to −77
C.V-E	3	Mercury engine, gift from Sweden; FO-19, −23 & -80
C.V-D	2	Panther engine, interned Norwegian aircraft; FO-65 & -66

=== Italy ===
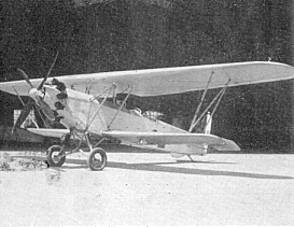
Romeo Ro.1

The C.VE was built in Italy by OFM (Officine Ferroviarie Meridionali, later IMAM) under licence in 1927 as the Romeo Ro.1. It was used by the Aviation Corps of the Regio Esercito (Italian Army) as an observation and ground attack aircraft. Well liked in the civilian market, it was selected for use by Air Marshal Italo Balbo, as superior to the Breda A.7 and Ansaldo A.120. It entered service in 1927, in Italian Libya against the local rebels. It was used both for reconnaissance and light attack. It was convertible as a three-seat machine, or as a light attack aircraft (two machine-guns), or as a very long range aircraft with an auxiliary fuel tank that increased the endurance from five to twelve hours. The last version had a 410 kW (550 hp) engine instead of 321 kW (430 hp) and produced until 1934, a total of 456, but it was outdated and too slow for the standards of the mid-1930s. Although this was only an army observation aircraft, it still had a quite powerful engine and performance. In 1933, there were 40 squadrons, of seven machines each, related to the Italian Army, with 238 Ro.1s as the main aircraft force. It was the most numerous Italian aircraft in the Second Italo-Abyssinian War.

=== Norway ===
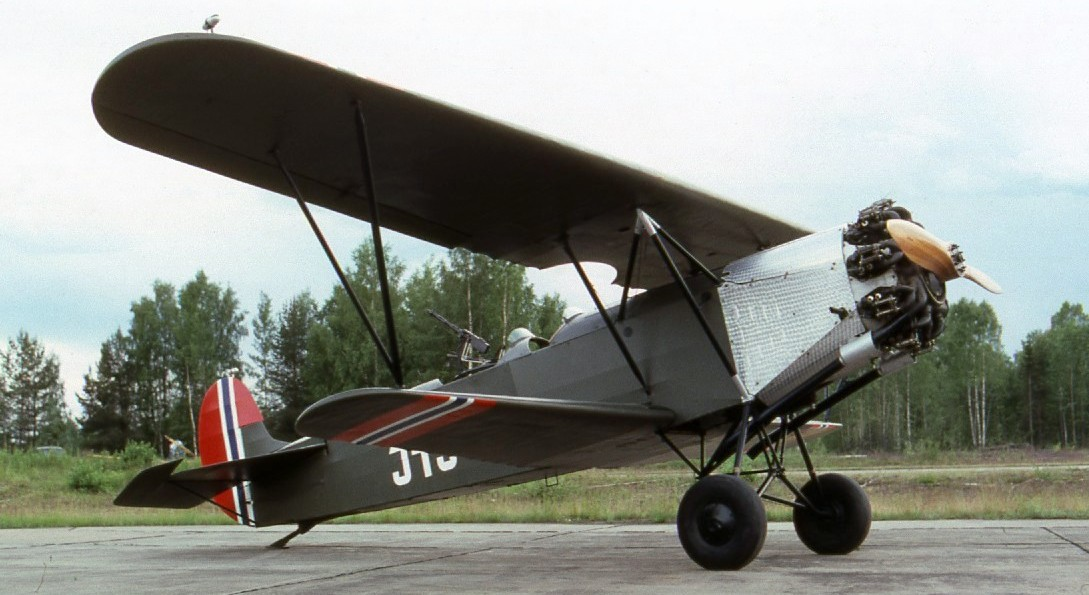
Norwegian Army Air Service Fokker C.V-D

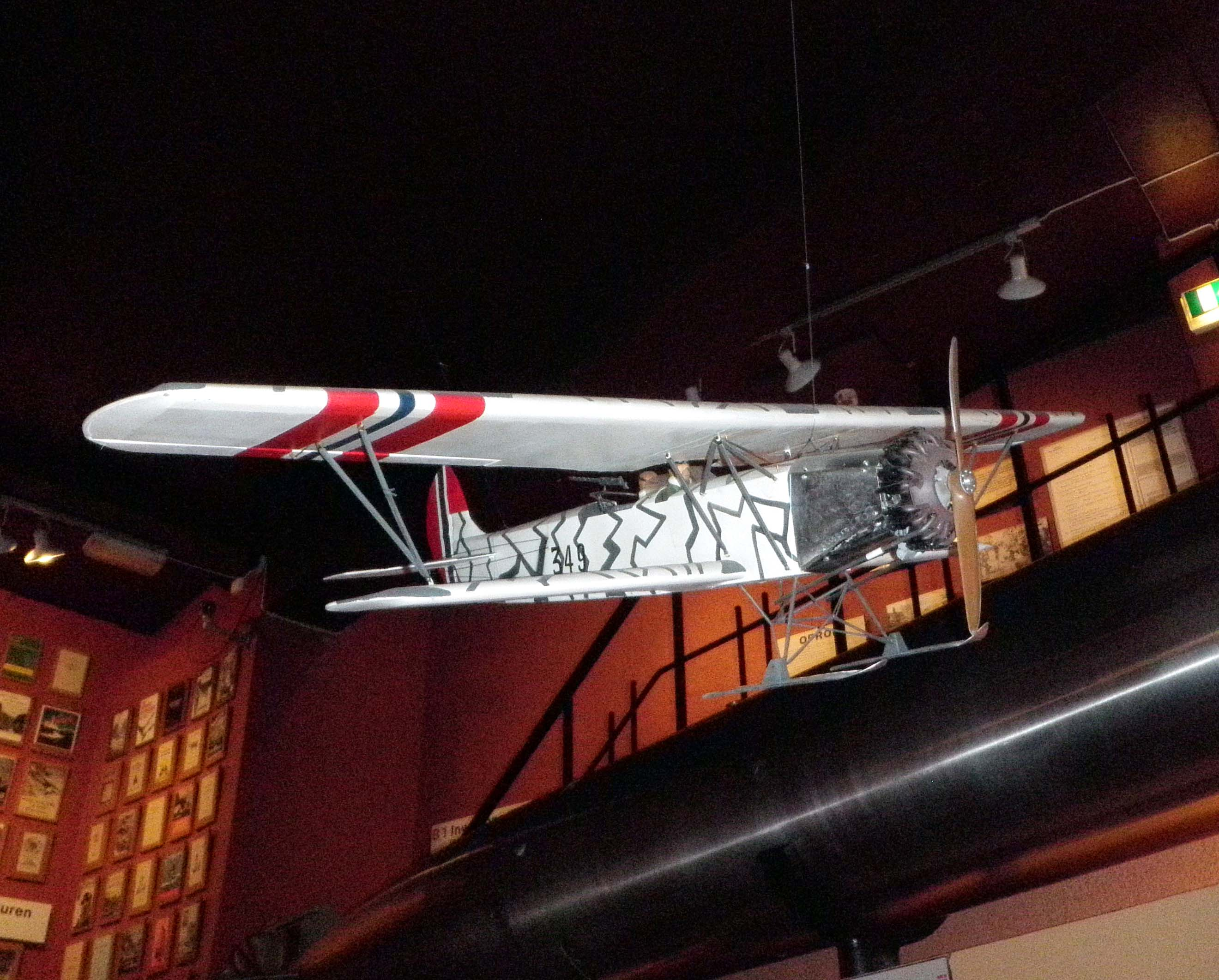
Model of a Norwegian Army Air Service Fokker C.V in winter camouflage

The Norwegian Army Air Service bought its first five C.VEs in 1926. The initial purchase agreement with Fokker included license production rights, and in the period 1929–1931, 15 C.VEs were manufactured at the NoAAS' aircraft factory at Kjeller. After the production of C.VEs ended, a further 28 C.VDs followed between 1932 and 1939. In total, the NoAAS operated 48 Fokker C.Vs, 43 of which were license built in Norway. When the Germans invaded Norway on 9 April 1940, 42 Fokker C.Vs were still in Norwegian service. The C.Vs were based on several air bases in different parts of the country and mostly saw service as reconnaissance aircraft and light bombers. Although the planes were outdated, they still saw extensive and successful service in the bomber role during the April–June 1940 Norwegian Campaign, supporting Norwegian ground troops fighting on the Narvik front.

=== Netherlands ===
The type was used by the Luchtvaartafdeeling (Royal Netherlands Air Force), Marine Luchtvaartdienst (Netherlands Naval Aviation Service) and KNIL-ML (Royal Netherlands East Indies Army Air Force). For the Luchtvaartafdeling, 67 examples were produced in several batches between 1926 and 1934. Twenty-eight were still operational at the time of the German attack on the Netherlands on 10 May 1940. They were used successfully on reconnaissance and bombing missions using "nap of the earth" (HuBoBe, short for huisje-boompje-beestje, literally translated into house-tree-animal, referring to the low altitude at which they flew) flying techniques. Nearly two dozen aircraft were used as trainers and hacks, or in storage and repair.

=== Sweden ===
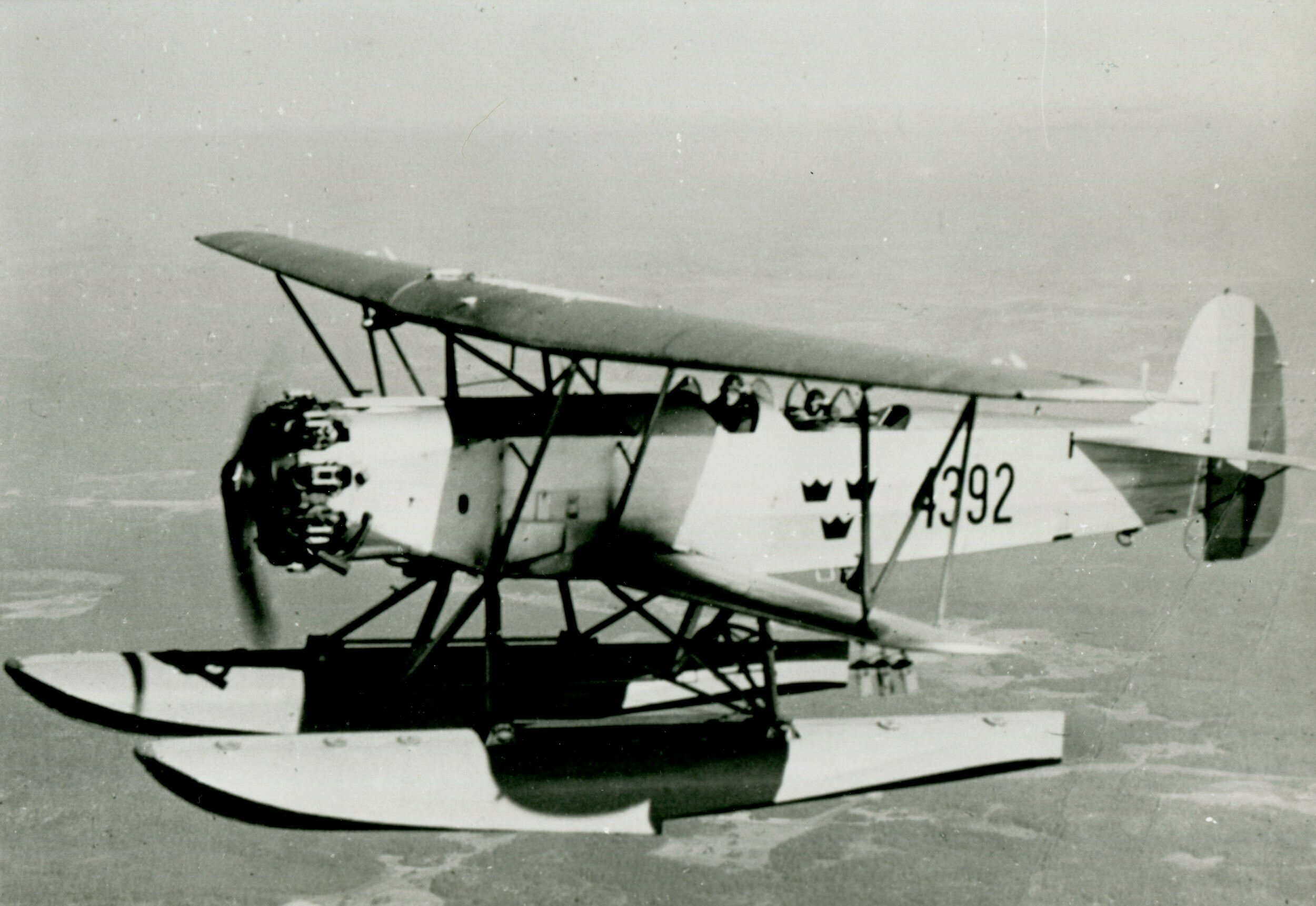
The Swedish license built C.V-E (S 6H) floatplane in 1931.

In 1927, the Swedish Air Force purchased two C.VDs (J 3) and two C.VE (S 6) to serve as models for the eventual license manufacturing of the aircraft by CVM at Malmen. The four aircraft were flown to Sweden in 1928. They proved suitable and an agreement for licence production was made and a further four C.V-E and six C.V-D were purchased, the latter designated J 3A. Seven C.VD ordered from CVM were built as C.VE, as by 1929 it was clear the type was unsuitable as a fighter, but still they were designated J 3B.

In 1931, the J 3B were redesignated S 6, the J 3 and J 3A S 6A. Ten C.VE with Nohab My VI engines instead of Jupiter VI engines were given the designation S 6B.

The S 6 became the prime liaison aircraft for the Swedish Air Force. It was used for fire spotting, aerial photographing and liaison duty in conjunction with the Army. At the outbreak of World War II, there were 36 aircraft left in service. They would continue until being replaced by Saab 17s from 1942. CVM manufactured 17 S 6 between 1929 and 1932. Some were fitted with floats and designated S 6H.

In 1945, the SwAF sold three S 6s to Svensk Flygtjänst to be used for aerial application over forest. Two other were sold to Skåneflyg in 1947. One is preserved and can be seen in the Swedish Air Force Museum. Lieutenant Einar Lundborg rescued the Italian General Umberto Nobile in 1928, with a S 6B, equipped with skis. Nobile was on an ice shelf after his airship Italia had crashed on its way to the North Pole.

Name		Number	Notes
(Sweden)	(Netherlands)	Number	Notes
S 6	Fokker C.V-E	30	6 Fokker C.V-E and 24 CVM Fokker C.V-Es, Jupiter VI engine 336 kW (450 hp)
S 6A	Fokker C.V-E	8	7 Fokker C.V-E and 1 CVM Fokker C.V-E, Jupiter VI engine 336 kW (450 hp)
S 6B	CVM C.V-E	10	1934–45, NOHAB My VI engine 447 kW (600 hp)
S 6H	C.V-E	?	CVM Fokker C.V-E (Hydro) with pontoons
J 3	Fokker C.V-D	2	1927–30, designation change to S 6A in 1931
J 3A	Fokker C.V-D	6	1929–30, designation change to S 6A in 1931
J 3B	CVM C.V-D	6	1930–45, designation change to S 6 in 1931

=== Switzerland ===
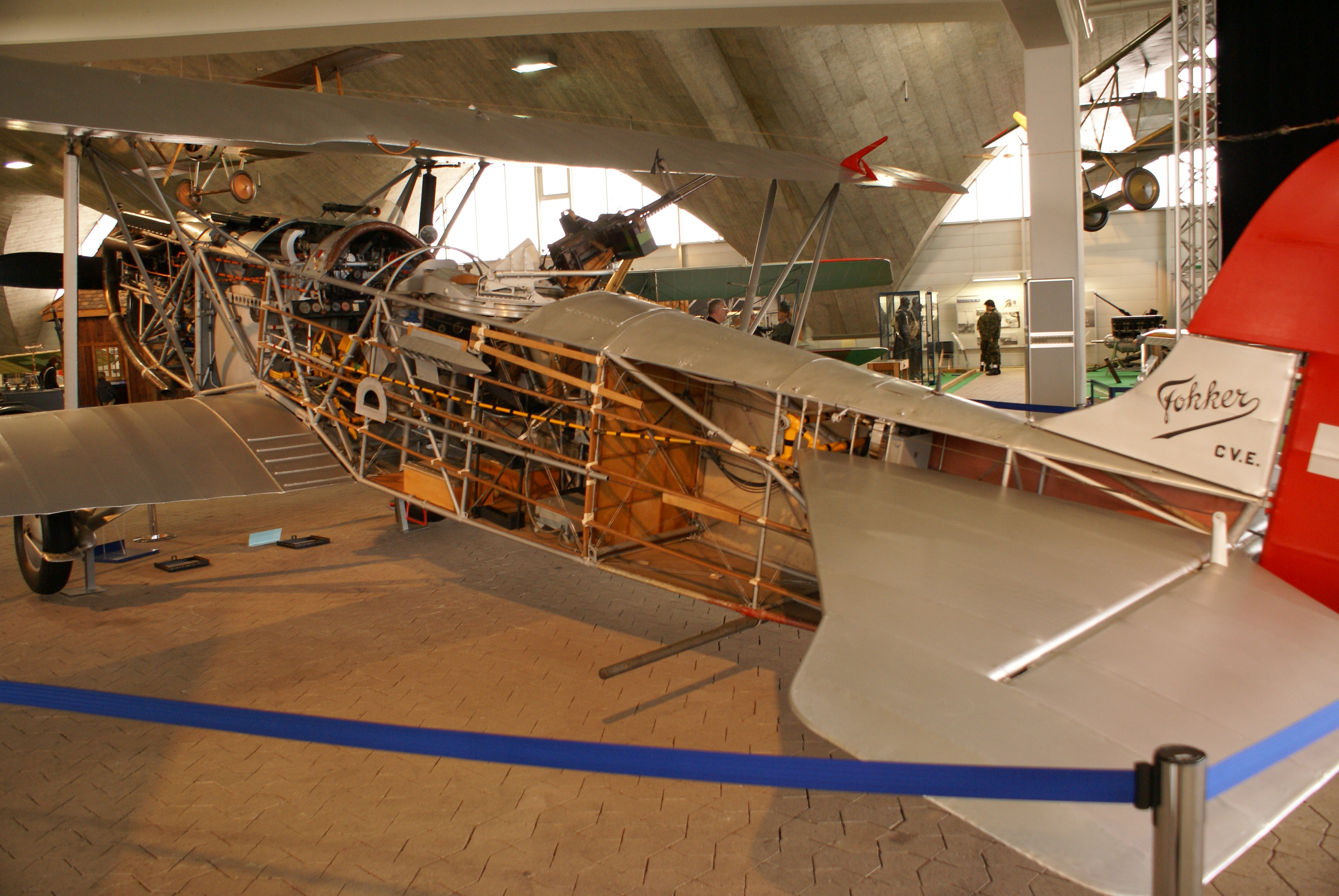
Cutaway model of a Swiss Army Air Corps Fokker C.V-E.

After comparative trials in 1927, Swiss authorities had 48 C.V.-E licence-built in Switzerland for use by the Swiss Air Force (then the Swiss Army Air Corps). 24 machines were built at K+W Thun and 24 at Doflug Altenrhein. The aircraft were in service from 1933 to 1940 and were armed with bombs, two pilot machine guns and a double machine gun for the observer. The Swiss Air Force used their C.Vs as target tugs until 1954, after their retirement from frontline service.

=== Germany ===
During their occupation of Denmark, the Germans seized some Danish Fokker C.V.-Es. Some of these aircraft were used by the Estonian volunteer-manned Nachtschlachtgruppe 11 (Night Ground Attack Wing 11) at Rahkla (Note: There are two villages in Estonia called Rahkla, namely Rahkla, Rakvere Parish and Rahkla, Vinni Parish. The sources do not say which one this was.) in 1944. NSGr. 11 used its C.V-Es on the Eastern Front to carry out disruptive harassment night bombing sorties against the Russian front lines. These operations were carried out in response to similar nocturnal operations by Soviet light aircraft, such as Po-2 biplanes. Two of the C.V-Es of the NSGr. 11 were flown to Sweden in October 1944 by four Estonian defectors, and one of them was returned to the Danes by the Swedes in 1947.

== Variants ==
C.V-A
(or C.Va) reconnaissance aircraft
C.V-B
(or C.Vb) reconnaissance aircraft, 18 built.
C.V-C
(or C.Vc) ground attack aircraft. Users: the Netherlands 6, Bolivia 5
C.V-D
(or C.Vd) reconnaissance, bomber and escort fighter. Users: Finland 2, Denmark 49, Hungary 68 (Ds and Es), the Netherlands 119 (VIs, Ds and Cs), Norway 27, Sweden 2, Switzerland 3, Germany 15 (Ds and Es).
C.V-E
(or C.Ve) light bomber. Users: Finland 17, Denmark 31, Hungary 68 (Ds and Es), the Netherlands 18, KNIL 20, Germany 15 (Ds and Es), Norway 46, Sweden 51, Switzerland 61.
C.V-W
C.V-C floatplane. One built.

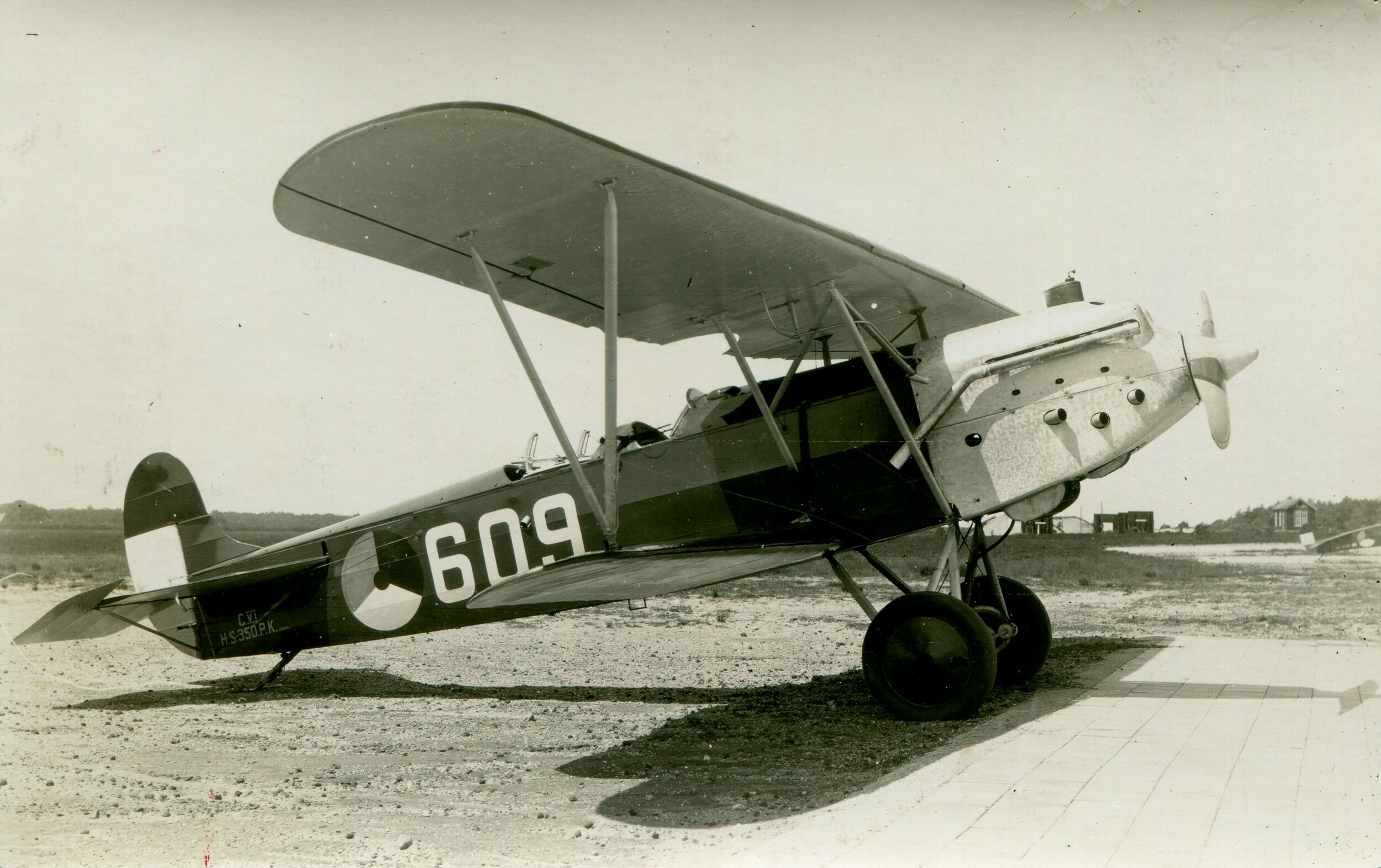
Fokker C.VI in Dutch service.

C.VI
reconnaissance aircraft with Hispano-Suiza engine, 33 converted from C.V-D
C.IX
reconnaissance variant of C.V-E with Hispano-Suiza 12N engine; five built for Netherlands, one exported to Switzerland
IMAM Ro.1 and Ro.1-bis
Italian licence built light bomber; 349 manufactured
Manfred Weiss WM-9 Budapest
licence-built Fokker C.V-E
Manfred Weiss WM-11 Budapest
Hungarian licence-built Fokker C.V-D
Manfred Weiss WM-14 Budapest
Hungarian licence-built Fokker C.V-D
Manfred Weiss WM-16 Budapest

WM-16A with 410 kW (550 hp) Gnome-Rhône 9K Mistral, 9 built
WM-16B with 641.3 kW (860 hp) Gnome-Rhône 14K Mistral Major, 9 built

Manfred Weiss WM-21 Sólyom
development of WM-16

== Operators ==
Bolivia

- Bolivian Air Force

Republic of China

- Republic of China Air Force

Denmark

- Hærens Flyvertropper (Danish Army Air Corps)

Finland

- Finnish Air Force

Germany

- Luftwaffe

Kingdom of Italy

- Regia Aeronautica – Ro.1 and Ro.1-bis

Kingdom of Hungary

- Royal Hungarian Air Force – The Royal Hungarian Air Force used its C.Vs in the war with Slovakia

Netherlands

- Royal Netherlands Air Force
- Royal Netherlands East Indies Army Air Force
- Royal Netherlands Navy

Norway

- Norwegian Army Air Service (1926–1940)

Soviet Union

- Soviet Air Force – Two aircraft, used for tests and trials.

Sweden

- Swedish Air Force – (S 6)

Switzerland

- Swiss Air Force

United States

- United States Navy – A single Ro.1 was purchased for the use of the US Naval Air Attaché in 1928

== Specifications (C.V) ==
Data from War over Holland National Norwegian Aviation Museum Thulinista Hornetiin

General characteristics

- Crew: 2
- Length: 9.25 m (30 ft 4 in)
- Wingspan: 12.50 m (41 ft 0 in)
- Height: 3.3 m (10 ft 10 in)
- Wing area: 39.30 m^{2} (423.0 sq ft)
- Empty weight: 1,920 kg (4,233 lb)
- Max takeoff weight: 2,145 kg (4,729 lb)
- Powerplant: 1 × Rolls-Royce Kestrel VIIb V-12 liquid-cooled piston engine, 470 kW (630 hp)

Performance

- Maximum speed: 250 km/h (160 mph, 130 kn)
- Cruise speed: 180 km/h (110 mph, 97 kn)
- Range: 1,000 km (620 mi, 540 nmi)
- Service ceiling: 6,500 m (21,300 ft)

Armament

- Guns: 2 × 7.9 mm (.31 in) FN synchronized fixed machine guns, 1 × 7.9 mm (.31 in) Lewis machine gun on flexible mount in the rear
- Bombs: 200 kg (440 lb) of bombs under wings

== See also ==
Related lists

- List of military aircraft of Norway
- List of military aircraft of Sweden
- List of aircraft of the Finnish Air Force
- List of aircraft of World War II
