= Norwegian Army Air Service =

Norwegian Army Air Service (NoAAS)
- Hærens flyvåpen
- NoAAS marking
- Active: 1914 to 10 November 1944
- Country: Norway
- Branch: Norwegian Army
- Engagements: Second World War: • Norwegian Campaign • Battle of Britain • Dieppe Raid • Battle of Normandy

The Norwegian Army Air Service (NoAAS) (Norwegian: Hærens flyvåpen) was established in 1914. Its main base and aircraft factory was at Kjeller. On 10 November 1944, the NoAAS merged with the Royal Norwegian Navy Air Service to form the Royal Norwegian Air Force.

== See also ==
- FF9 Kaje
- Fokker C.V
